= 2015–16 United States network television schedule =

Television schedule for the fall of 2015

The 2015–16 network television schedule for the five major English-language commercial broadcast networks in the United States covers prime time hours from September 2015 to August 2016. The schedule is followed by a list per network of returning series, new series, and series canceled after the 2014–15 season.

NBC was the first to announce its fall schedule on May 10, 2015, followed by Fox on May 11, ABC on May 12, CBS on May 13, and The CW on May 14.

PBS is not included; member stations have local flexibility over most of their schedules and broadcast times for network shows may vary. Ion Television, The CW Plus, and MyNetworkTV are also not included since the majority of the networks' schedules comprise syndicated reruns (with limited original programming on the latter two). The CW is not included on weekends, since it does not offer network programming.

New series are highlighted in bold.

All times are U.S. Eastern and Pacific time (except for some live sports or events). Subtract one hour for Central and Mountain times.

Note: From August 5 to August 21, 2016, all NBC primetime programming was pre-empted for coverage of the 2016 Summer Olympics in Rio de Janeiro, Brazil.

Each of the 30 highest-rated shows is listed with its rank and rating as determined by Nielsen Media Research.

== Legend ==
- Light blue indicates local programming.
- Gray indicates encore programming.
- Blue-gray indicates news programming.
- Light green indicates live sporting events.
- Light purple indicates movies.
- Red indicates series being burned off and other irregularly scheduled programs, including specials.
- Yellow indicates the top-10 most watched programs of the season.
- Cyan indicates the top-20 most watched programs of the season.
- Magenta indicates the top-30 most watched programs of the season.

== Sunday ==
Network		7:00 p.m.	7:30 p.m.	8:00 p.m.	8:30 p.m.	9:00 p.m.	9:30 p.m.	10:00 p.m.	10:30 p.m.
ABC	Fall	America's Funniest Home Videos		Once Upon a Time		**Blood & Oil**		**Quantico**	
ABC	Winter	America's Funniest Home Videos		Galavant		Encore programming			
ABC	Spring	America's Funniest Home Videos		Once Upon a Time		**The Family**		**Quantico**	
ABC	Summer	America's Funniest Home Videos		Celebrity Family Feud		**The $100,000 Pyramid**		**Match Game**	
CBS	Fall	NFL on CBS	60 Minutes (15/7.7)		Madam Secretary (13/7.8) (Tied with Criminal Minds)		The Good Wife (21/7.1) (Tied with Blindspot and NCIS: Los Angeles)		CSI: Cyber (continued until 11:30 p.m.)
CBS	Late fall	NFL on CBS	60 Minutes (15/7.7)		Undercover Boss		The Good Wife (21/7.1) (Tied with Blindspot and NCIS: Los Angeles)		CSI: Cyber (continued until 11:30 p.m.)
CBS	Winter	60 Minutes (15/7.7)		Madam Secretary (13/7.8) (Tied with Criminal Minds)		The Good Wife (21/7.1) (Tied with Blindspot and NCIS: Los Angeles)		CSI: Cyber	
CBS	Spring	60 Minutes (15/7.7)		Madam Secretary (13/7.8) (Tied with Criminal Minds)		The Good Wife (21/7.1) (Tied with Blindspot and NCIS: Los Angeles)		Elementary	
CBS	Late spring	60 Minutes (15/7.7)		Madam Secretary (13/7.8) (Tied with Criminal Minds)		Undercover Boss		Elementary	
CBS	Summer	60 Minutes (15/7.7)		Big Brother		Madam Secretary (R)		Elementary	
CBS	Late summer	60 Minutes (15/7.7)		Big Brother		Madam Secretary (R)		**BrainDead**	
Fox	Fall	Fox NFL	Bob's Burgers	The Simpsons	Brooklyn Nine-Nine	Family Guy	The Last Man on Earth	Local programming	
Fox	Winter	The Simpsons (R)	Bob's Burgers	The Simpsons	**Cooper Barrett's Guide to Surviving Life**	Family Guy	**Bordertown**	Local programming	
Fox	Late winter	**Bordertown**	Bob's Burgers	The Simpsons	**Cooper Barrett's Guide to Surviving Life**	Family Guy	The Last Man on Earth	Local programming	
Fox	Spring	**Bordertown**	**Cooper Barrett's Guide to Surviving Life**	The Simpsons	Bob's Burgers	Family Guy	The Last Man on Earth	Local programming	
Fox	Late spring	**Bordertown**	The Simpsons (R)	The Simpsons	Bob's Burgers	Family Guy	The Last Man on Earth	Local programming	
Fox	Summer	Bob's Burgers (R)	The Simpsons (R)	The Simpsons	Brooklyn Nine-Nine (R)	Family Guy	The Last Man on Earth	Local programming	
NBC	Fall	Football Night in America		NBC Sunday Night Football (8:20 PM) (continued to game completion) (2/12.6)					
NBC	Winter	Dateline NBC		Encore programming					
NBC	Spring	**Little Big Shots** (R)		**Little Big Shots** (19/7.2) (Tied with How to Get Away with Murder)		The Carmichael Show	**Crowded**	Hollywood Game Night	
NBC	Late spring	**Dateline: On Assignment**		**Little Big Shots** (19/7.2) (Tied with How to Get Away with Murder)		The Carmichael Show	**Crowded**	Dateline NBC	
NBC	Summer	Encore programming							

== Monday ==
Network		8:00 p.m.	8:30 p.m.	9:00 p.m.	9:30 p.m.	10:00 p.m.	10:30 p.m.
ABC	Fall	Dancing with the Stars (7/8.8)				Castle	
ABC	Late fall	The Great Christmas Light Fight				**The Great Holiday Baking Show**	
ABC	Winter	The Bachelor				**Bachelor Live**	
ABC	Late winter	The Bachelor				Castle	
ABC	Spring	Dancing with the Stars (7/8.8)				Castle	
ABC	Late spring	The Bachelorette				Mistresses	
ABC	Late summer	Bachelor in Paradise				Mistresses	
CBS	Fall	The Big Bang Theory (3/12.5)	**Life in Pieces** (30/6.5) (Tied with Chicago Med and Shades of Blue)	Scorpion (16/7.6) (Tied with Scandal)		NCIS: Los Angeles (21/7.1) (Tied with Blindspot and The Good Wife)	
CBS	Late fall	**Supergirl**		Scorpion (16/7.6) (Tied with Scandal)		NCIS: Los Angeles (21/7.1) (Tied with Blindspot and The Good Wife)	
CBS	Winter	**Supergirl**		Scorpion (16/7.6) (Tied with Scandal)		NCIS: Los Angeles (21/7.1) (Tied with Blindspot and The Good Wife)	
CBS	Spring	Mike & Molly		The Big Bang Theory (R)	The Odd Couple	Person of Interest	
CBS	Summer	Mom (R)	2 Broke Girls (R)	Scorpion (R)		**BrainDead**	
CBS	Late summer	Mom (R)	2 Broke Girls (R)	Mom (R)	The Odd Couple (R)	Scorpion (R)	
The CW	Fall	**Crazy Ex-Girlfriend**		Jane the Virgin		Local programming	
The CW	Winter	**Crazy Ex-Girlfriend**		Jane the Virgin		Local programming	
The CW	Spring	Reign		Jane the Virgin		Local programming	
The CW	Late spring	Reign		Whose Line is it Anyway?	Whose Line is it Anyway? (R)	Local programming	
The CW	Summer	**Supergirl** (R)				Local programming	
Fox	Fall	Gotham		**Minority Report**		Local programming	
Fox	Winter	The X-Files (9/8.2) (Tied with The Voice: Monday)		**Lucifer**		Local programming	
Fox	Late winter	Gotham		**Lucifer**		Local programming	
Fox	Spring	Gotham		**Houdini & Doyle**		Local programming	
Fox	Summer	So You Think You Can Dance		**Houdini & Doyle**		Local programming	
Fox	Late summer	So You Think You Can Dance				Local programming	
NBC	Fall	The Voice (9/8.2) (Tied with The X-Files)				**Blindspot** (21/7.1) (Tied with The Good Wife and NCIS: Los Angeles)	
NBC	Winter	**Superstore**	**Telenovela**	The Biggest Loser: Temptation Nation			
NBC	Spring	The Voice (9/8.2) (Tied with The X-Files)				**Blindspot** (21/7.1) (Tied with The Good Wife and NCIS: Los Angeles)	
NBC	Summer	American Ninja Warrior				**Spartan: Ultimate Team Challenge**	
NBC	Late summer	American Ninja Warrior				Running Wild with Bear Grylls	

== Tuesday ==
Network		8:00 p.m.	8:30 p.m.	9:00 p.m.	9:30 p.m.	10:00 p.m.	10:30 p.m.
ABC	Fall	**The Muppets**	Fresh Off the Boat	Agents of S.H.I.E.L.D.		Encore programming	
ABC	Mid-fall	**The Muppets**	Fresh Off the Boat	Agents of S.H.I.E.L.D.		**Wicked City**	
ABC	Late fall	**The Muppets**	Fresh Off the Boat	Agents of S.H.I.E.L.D.		Encore programming	
ABC	Winter	Fresh Off the Boat	**The Muppets**	Agent Carter		What Would You Do?	
ABC	Spring	Fresh Off the Boat	**The Real O'Neals**	Agents of S.H.I.E.L.D.		**Of Kings and Prophets**	
ABC	Late spring	Fresh Off the Boat	**The Real O'Neals**	Agents of S.H.I.E.L.D.		Beyond the Tank	
ABC	Summer	The Middle (R)	Black-ish (R)	**Uncle Buck**		**To Tell the Truth**	
ABC	Mid-summer	Bachelor in Paradise		Bachelor in Paradise: After Paradise		The Middle (R)	Fresh Off the Boat (R)
ABC	Late summer	The Middle (R)		Fresh Off the Boat (R)	**The Real O'Neals** (R)	The Middle (R)	Fresh Off the Boat (R)
CBS	Fall	NCIS (1/12.8)		NCIS: New Orleans (6/9.4)		**Limitless**	
CBS	Winter	NCIS (1/12.8)		NCIS: New Orleans (6/9.4)		**Limitless**	
CBS	Spring	NCIS (1/12.8)		Person of Interest		**Limitless**	
CBS	Summer	NCIS (1/12.8)		Zoo		NCIS: New Orleans (R)	
The CW	Fall	The Flash		iZombie		Local programming	
The CW	Winter	The Flash		iZombie		Local programming	
The CW	Spring	The Flash		**Containment**		Local programming	
The CW	Summer	Whose Line Is It Anyway?	Whose Line Is It Anyway? (R)	MADtv		Local programming	
Fox	Fall	**Grandfathered**	**The Grinder**	**Scream Queens**		Local programming	
Fox	Winter	New Girl	**Grandfathered**	Brooklyn Nine-Nine	**The Grinder**	Local programming	
Fox	Spring	New Girl	**Grandfathered**	Brooklyn Nine-Nine	**The Grinder**	Local programming	
Fox	Summer	Hotel Hell		**Coupled**		Local programming	
Fox	Late summer	Brooklyn Nine-Nine (R)	New Girl (R)	**Lucifer** (R)		Local programming	
NBC	Fall	The Voice (11/7.9) (Tied with Grey's Anatomy)				**Best Time Ever with Neil Patrick Harris**	
NBC	Mid-fall	**Best Time Ever with Neil Patrick Harris**		The Voice (11/7.9) (Tied with Grey's Anatomy)		Chicago Fire (24/7.0) (Tied with Hawaii Five-0)	
NBC	Late fall	The Voice (11/7.9) (Tied with Grey's Anatomy)		**Chicago Med** (30/6.5) (Tied with Life in Pieces and Shades of Blue)		Chicago Fire (24/7.0) (Tied with Hawaii Five-0)	
NBC	Winter	Hollywood Game Night		**Chicago Med** (30/6.5) (Tied with Life in Pieces and Shades of Blue)		Chicago Fire (24/7.0) (Tied with Hawaii Five-0)	
NBC	Spring	The Voice (11/7.9) (Tied with Grey's Anatomy)				Chicago Fire (24/7.0) (Tied with Hawaii Five-0)	
NBC	Late spring	The Voice (11/7.9) (Tied with Grey's Anatomy)		**Chicago Med** (30/6.5) (Tied with Life in Pieces and Shades of Blue)		Chicago Fire (24/7.0) (Tied with Hawaii Five-0)	
NBC	Summer	America's Got Talent				**Maya & Marty**	
NBC	Late summer	America's Got Talent				**Better Late Than Never**	

Note: Heartbeat premiered on March 22, 2016 on NBC.

== Wednesday ==
Network		8:00 p.m.	8:30 p.m.	9:00 p.m.	9:30 p.m.	10:00 p.m.	10:30 p.m.
ABC	Fall	The Middle	The Goldbergs	Modern Family	Black-ish	Nashville	
ABC	Winter	The Middle	The Goldbergs	Modern Family	Black-ish	American Crime	
ABC	Spring	The Middle	The Goldbergs	Modern Family	Black-ish	Nashville	
ABC	Summer	The Goldbergs (R)		Modern Family	Black-ish	Encore programming	
CBS	Fall	Survivor: Cambodia – Second Chance (28/6.6) (Tied with Code Black)		Criminal Minds (13/7.8) (Tied with Madam Secretary)		**Code Black** (28/6.6) (Tied with Survivor)	
CBS	Winter	2 Broke Girls	Mike & Molly	Criminal Minds (13/7.8) (Tied with Madam Secretary)		**Code Black** (28/6.6) (Tied with Survivor)	
CBS	Late winter	Survivor: Kaôh Rōng – Brains vs. Brawn vs. Beauty (28/6.6) (Tied with Code Black)		Criminal Minds (13/7.8) (Tied with Madam Secretary)		**Code Black** (28/6.6) (Tied with Survivor)	
CBS	Spring	Survivor: Kaôh Rōng – Brains vs. Brawn vs. Beauty (28/6.6) (Tied with Code Black)		Criminal Minds (13/7.8) (Tied with Madam Secretary)		**Criminal Minds: Beyond Borders**	
CBS	Summer	Big Brother		Criminal Minds (13/7.8) (Tied with Madam Secretary)		**American Gothic**	
The CW	Fall	Arrow		Supernatural		Local programming	
The CW	Winter	Arrow		Supernatural		Local programming	
The CW	Spring	Arrow		Supernatural		Local programming	
The CW	Summer	Penn & Teller: Fool Us		Whose Line Is It Anyway?	Whose Line Is It Anyway? (R)	Local programming	
Fox	Fall	**Rosewood**		Empire (5/10.2)		Local programming	
Fox	Winter	American Idol (26/6.9)		**Second Chance**		Local programming	
Fox	Late winter	American Idol (26/6.9)		Hell's Kitchen		Local programming	
Fox	Spring	**Rosewood**		Hell's Kitchen		Local programming	
Fox	Late spring	**Rosewood**		Empire (5/10.2)		Local programming	
Fox	Summer	MasterChef		Wayward Pines		Local programming	
NBC	Fall	The Mysteries of Laura		Law & Order: Special Victims Unit		Chicago P.D.	
NBC	Winter	The Mysteries of Laura		Law & Order: Special Victims Unit		Chicago P.D.	
NBC	Spring	**Heartbeat**		Law & Order: Special Victims Unit		Chicago P.D.	
NBC	Summer	American Ninja Warrior				The Night Shift	
NBC	Mid-summer	America's Got Talent				The Night Shift	
NBC	Late summer	America's Got Talent (R)		America's Got Talent		The Night Shift	

== Thursday ==
Network		8:00 p.m.	8:30 p.m.	9:00 p.m.	9:30 p.m.	10:00 p.m.	10:30 p.m.
ABC	Fall	Grey's Anatomy (11/7.9) (Tied with The Voice)		Scandal (16/7.6) (Tied with Scorpion)		How to Get Away with Murder (19/7.2) (Tied with Little Big Shots)	
ABC	Winter	Beyond the Tank		**My Diet Is Better Than Yours**			
ABC	Late winter	Grey's Anatomy (11/7.9) (Tied with The Voice)		Scandal (16/7.6) (Tied with Scorpion)		How to Get Away with Murder (19/7.2) (Tied with Little Big Shots)	
ABC	Spring	Grey's Anatomy (11/7.9) (Tied with The Voice)		Scandal (16/7.6) (Tied with Scorpion)		**The Catch**	
ABC	Summer	BattleBots		**Greatest Hits**		**Match Game** (R)	
ABC	Late summer	BattleBots		**The $100,000 Pyramid** (R)		**Match Game** (R)	
CBS	Fall	NFL Thursday Night Kickoff	Thursday Night Football (continued to game completion) (4/10.6)				
CBS	Late fall	The Big Bang Theory (3/12.5)	**Life in Pieces** (30/6.5) (Tied with Chicago Med and Shades of Blue)	Mom	2 Broke Girls	Elementary	
CBS	Winter	The Big Bang Theory (3/12.5)	**Life in Pieces** (30/6.5) (Tied with Chicago Med and Shades of Blue)	Mom	**Angel from Hell**	Elementary	
CBS	Late winter	The Big Bang Theory (3/12.5)	**Life in Pieces** (30/6.5) (Tied with Chicago Med and Shades of Blue)	Mom	2 Broke Girls	Elementary	
CBS	Spring	The Big Bang Theory (3/12.5)	The Odd Couple	Mom	2 Broke Girls	**Rush Hour**	
CBS	Summer	The Big Bang Theory (3/12.5)	**Life in Pieces** (R)	Big Brother		**Code Black** (R)	
The CW	Fall	The Vampire Diaries		The Originals		Local programming	
The CW	Winter	**Legends of Tomorrow**		The 100		Local programming	
The CW	Spring	**Legends of Tomorrow**		The 100		Local programming	
The CW	Summer	**Legends of Tomorrow**		Beauty & the Beast		Local programming	
Fox	Fall	Bones		Sleepy Hollow		Local programming	
Fox	Winter	American Idol (27/6.7)				Local programming	
Fox	Spring	Bones		**American Grit**		Local programming	
Fox	Summer	Bones		Home Free		Local programming	
NBC	Fall	**Heroes Reborn**		The Blacklist (18/7.3)		**The Player**	
NBC	Winter	**Heroes Reborn**		The Blacklist (18/7.3)		**Shades of Blue** (30/6.5) (Tied with Chicago Med and Life in Pieces)	
NBC	Late winter	**You, Me and the Apocalypse**		The Blacklist (18/7.3)		**Shades of Blue** (30/6.5) (Tied with Chicago Med and Life in Pieces)	
NBC	Spring	**Strong**		The Blacklist (18/7.3)		**Game of Silence**	
NBC	Summer	**Spartan: Ultimate Team Challenge** (R)		**Spartan: Ultimate Team Challenge**		Aquarius	
NBC	Late summer	Encore programming					

== Friday ==
Network		8:00 p.m.	8:30 p.m.	9:00 p.m.	9:30 p.m.	10:00 p.m.	10:30 p.m.
ABC	Fall	Last Man Standing	**Dr. Ken**	Shark Tank		20/20	
ABC	Winter	Last Man Standing	**Dr. Ken**	Shark Tank		20/20	
ABC	Spring	Beyond the Tank		Shark Tank		20/20	
ABC	Summer	Shark Tank (R)		What Would You Do?		20/20	
CBS	Fall	The Amazing Race		Hawaii Five-0 (24/7.0) (Tied with Chicago Fire)		Blue Bloods (8/8.4)	
CBS	Winter	Undercover Boss		Hawaii Five-0 (24/7.0) (Tied with Chicago Fire)		Blue Bloods (8/8.4)	
CBS	Spring	The Amazing Race		Hawaii Five-0 (24/7.0) (Tied with Chicago Fire)		Blue Bloods (8/8.4)	
CBS	Summer	Undercover Boss		Hawaii Five-0 (24/7.0) (Tied with Chicago Fire)		Blue Bloods (8/8.4)	
The CW	Fall	Reign		America's Next Top Model		Local programming	
The CW	Winter	The Vampire Diaries		The Originals		Local programming	
The CW	Spring	Masters of Illusion		Penn & Teller: Fool Us (R)		Local programming	
The CW	Summer	Masters of Illusion		Penn & Teller: Fool Us (R)		Local programming	
Fox	Fall	MasterChef Junior		World's Funniest		Local programming	
Fox	Winter	MasterChef Junior		Hell's Kitchen		Local programming	
Fox	Late winter	Sleepy Hollow		**Second Chance**		Local programming	
Fox	Spring	Hell's Kitchen (R)		Hell's Kitchen		Local programming	
Fox	Late spring	**Fox Movie Special**				Local programming	
Fox	Summer	**Rosewood** (R)		MasterChef (R)		Local programming	
NBC	Fall	Encore programming		Dateline NBC			
NBC	Mid-fall	Undateable	**Truth Be Told**	Grimm		Dateline NBC	
NBC	Winter	Undateable	**Superstore** (R)	Grimm		Dateline NBC	
NBC	Spring	Caught on Camera with Nick Cannon		Grimm		Dateline NBC	
NBC	Summer	America's Got Talent (R)				Dateline NBC	

== Saturday ==
Network		8:00 p.m.	8:30 p.m.	9:00 p.m.	9:30 p.m.	10:00 p.m.	10:30 p.m.
ABC	Fall	ESPN Saturday Night Football (continued to game completion)					
ABC	Late fall	Encore programming					
ABC	Winter	NBA Countdown	**NBA Saturday Primetime**				
ABC	Spring	ABC Saturday Movie of the Week					
ABC	Summer	**People's List**		In an Instant			
ABC	Late summer	Last Man Standing (R)	**Dr. Ken** (R)	Encore programming		Boston EMS	
CBS	Fall	Crimetime Saturday				48 Hours	
CBS	Winter	Crimetime Saturday				48 Hours	
CBS	Spring	Crimetime Saturday				48 Hours	
CBS	Summer	**Angel from Hell**		**Rush Hour**		48 Hours	
Fox	Fall	Fox College Football (continued to game completion)					
Fox	Winter	**Rosewood** (R)		**Lucifer** (R)		Local programming	
Fox	Spring	**Houdini and Doyle** (R)		**American Grit** (R)		Local programming	
Fox	Summer	Baseball Night in America				Local programming	
NBC	Fall	Dateline NBC				SNL Vintage	
NBC	Winter	Dateline NBC				SNL Vintage	
NBC	Spring	Encore programming					
NBC	Mid-spring	NHL on NBC (continued to game completion)					
NBC	Summer	Encore programming		Aquarius			

== By network ==
=== ABC ===
Returning series:

- 20/20
- 20/20: In an Instant
- 500 Questions
- ABC Saturday Movie of the Week
- Agent Carter
- Agents of S.H.I.E.L.D.
- America's Funniest Home Videos
- American Crime
- The Bachelor
- Bachelor in Paradise
- The Bachelorette
- BattleBots
- Beyond the Tank
- Black-ish
- Boston EMS
- Castle
- Celebrity Family Feud
- Dancing with the Stars
- Fresh Off the Boat
- Galavant
- The Goldbergs
- The Great Christmas Light Fight
- Grey's Anatomy
- How to Get Away with Murder
- Last Man Standing
- The Middle
- Mistresses
- Modern Family
- Nashville
- Once Upon a Time
- Scandal
- Shark Tank

New series:

- **The $100,000 Pyramid** *
- **Blood & Oil**
- **The Catch** *
- **Dr. Ken**
- **The Family** *
- **The Great Holiday Baking Show**
- **Greatest Hits** *
- **Madoff** *
- **Match Game** *
- **The Muppets**
- **My Diet Is Better Than Yours** *
- **NBA Saturday Primetime on ABC** *
- **Of Kings and Prophets** *
- **People's List** *
- **Quantico**
- **The Real O'Neals** *
- **To Tell the Truth** *
- **Uncle Buck** *
- **Wicked City**

Not returning from 2014–15:

- The Astronaut Wives Club
- Cristela
- Forever
- Manhattan Love Story
- Repeat After Me
- Resurrection
- Revenge
- Rookie Blue
- Secrets and Lies (returned for 2016–17)
- Selfie
- The Taste
- The Whispers

=== CBS ===
Returning series:

- 2 Broke Girls
- 48 Hours
- 60 Minutes
- The Amazing Race
- The Big Bang Theory
- Big Brother
- Blue Bloods
- Criminal Minds
- CSI: Crime Scene Investigation
- CSI: Cyber
- Elementary
- The Good Wife
- Hawaii Five-0
- Madam Secretary
- Mike & Molly
- Mom
- NCIS
- NCIS: Los Angeles
- NCIS: New Orleans
- The Odd Couple
- Person of Interest
- Scorpion
- Survivor
- Thursday Night Football
- Undercover Boss
- Zoo

New series:

- **American Gothic** *
- **Angel from Hell** *
- **BrainDead** *
- **Code Black**
- **Criminal Minds: Beyond Borders** *
- **Life in Pieces**
- **Limitless**
- **Rush Hour** *
- **Supergirl**

Not returning from 2014–15:

- Battle Creek
- The Briefcase
- Extant
- The McCarthys
- The Mentalist
- The Millers
- Stalker
- Two and a Half Men
- Under the Dome

=== The CW ===
Returning series:

- The 100
- America's Next Top Model
- Arrow
- Beauty & the Beast
- The Flash
- iZombie
- Jane the Virgin
- Mad TV (moved from Fox)
- The Originals
- Penn & Teller: Fool Us
- Reign
- Supernatural
- The Vampire Diaries
- Whose Line Is It Anyway?

New series:

- **Containment** *
- **Crazy Ex-Girlfriend**
- **Legends of Tomorrow** *

Not returning from 2014–15:

- Hart of Dixie
- The Messengers
- Significant Mother

=== Fox ===
Returning series:

- American Idol
- Bob's Burgers
- Bones
- Brooklyn Nine-Nine
- Empire
- Family Guy
- Fox College Football
- Gotham
- Hell's Kitchen
- Home Free
- The Last Man on Earth
- MasterChef
- MasterChef Junior
- New Girl
- NFL on Fox
- The Simpsons
- Sleepy Hollow
- Wayward Pines
- World's Funniest
- The X-Files (Renewed from 2001–02)

New series:

- **American Grit** *
- **Bordertown** *
- **Cooper Barrett's Guide to Surviving Life** *
- **Coupled** *
- **Grandfathered**
- **The Grinder**
- **Houdini & Doyle** *
- **Lucifer** *
- **Minority Report**
- **Rosewood**
- **Scream Queens**
- **Second Chance** *

Not returning from 2014–15:

- Backstrom
- The Following
- Glee
- Knock Knock Live
- The Mindy Project (moved to Hulu)
- Mulaney
- Red Band Society
- Utopia
- Weird Loners

=== NBC ===
Returning series:

- American Ninja Warrior
- America's Got Talent
- Aquarius
- The Biggest Loser
- The Blacklist
- The Carmichael Show
- Caught on Camera with Nick Cannon
- Chicago Fire
- Chicago P.D.
- Dateline NBC
- Football Night in America
- Grimm
- Hollywood Game Night
- I Can Do That
- Law & Order: Special Victims Unit
- The Mysteries of Laura
- NBC Sunday Night Football
- The Night Shift
- Running Wild with Bear Grylls
- Undateable
- The Voice

New series:

- **Best Time Ever with Neil Patrick Harris**
- **Better Late Than Never** *
- **Blindspot**
- **Chicago Med**
- **Crowded** *
- **Game of Silence** *
- **Heartbeat** *
- **Heroes Reborn**
- **Little Big Shots** *
- **Maya & Marty** *
- **The Player**
- **Shades of Blue** *
- **Spartan: Ultimate Team Challenge** *
- **Strong** *
- **Superstore**
- **Telenovela**
- **Truth Be Told**
- **You, Me and the Apocalypse** *

Not returning from 2014–15:

- A to Z
- A.D. The Bible Continues
- About a Boy
- Allegiance
- American Odyssey
- The Apprentice
- Bad Judge
- Constantine
- Hannibal
- Marry Me
- Mr. Robinson
- One Big Happy
- Parenthood
- Parks and Recreation
- State of Affairs
- Welcome to Sweden

== Renewals and cancellations ==
=== Full season pickups ===
==== ABC ====
- Dr. Ken—Picked up for a 22-episode full season on October 20, 2015.
- Fresh Off the Boat—Picked up for a 22-episode full season on October 13, 2015. Two additional episodes were ordered on November 17, 2015, bringing the order to 24 episodes.
- Quantico—Picked up for a 19-episode full season on October 13, 2015. Three additional episodes were ordered on November 6, 2015, bringing the order to 22 episodes.

==== CBS ====
- Life in Pieces—Picked up for a 22-episode full season on October 27, 2015.
- Limitless—Picked up for a 22-episode full season on October 23, 2015.
- Supergirl—Picked up for a 20-episode full season on November 30, 2015.

==== The CW ====
- Crazy Ex-Girlfriend—Picked up for an 18-episode full season on November 23, 2015.
- iZombie—Picked up for a 19-episode full season on November 23, 2015.

==== Fox ====
- Grandfathered—Picked up for a 22-episode full season on October 28, 2015.
- The Grinder—Picked up for a 22-episode full season on October 27, 2015.
- Rosewood—Picked up for a 22-episode full season on October 16, 2015.

==== NBC ====
- Blindspot—Picked up for a 22-episode full season on October 9, 2015. An additional episode was ordered on November 3, 2015, bringing the order to 23 episodes.
- Chicago Med—Picked up for an 18-episode full season on December 11, 2015.

=== Renewals ===
==== ABC ====
- 20/20—Renewed for a thirty-eighth season on May 17, 2016.
- The $100,000 Pyramid—Renewed for a second season on August 4, 2016.
- Agents of S.H.I.E.L.D.—Renewed for a fourth season on March 3, 2016.
- American Crime—Renewed for a third season on May 12, 2016.
- America's Funniest Home Videos—Renewed for a twenty-seventh season on March 3, 2016.
- The Bachelor—Renewed for a twenty-first season on March 3, 2016.
- Bachelor in Paradise—Renewed for a fourth season on September 6, 2016.
- Black-ish—Renewed for a third season on March 3, 2016.
- The Catch—Renewed for a second season on May 12, 2016.
- Celebrity Family Feud—Renewed for a third season on August 4, 2016.
- Dancing with the Stars—Renewed for a twenty-third season on March 3, 2016.
- Dr. Ken—Renewed for a second season on May 12, 2016.
- Fresh Off the Boat—Renewed for a third season on March 3, 2016.
- The Goldbergs—Renewed for a fourth season on March 3, 2016.
- Grey's Anatomy—Renewed for a thirteenth season on March 3, 2016.
- How to Get Away with Murder—Renewed for a third season on March 3, 2016.
- Last Man Standing—Renewed for a sixth season on May 13, 2016.
- Match Game—Renewed for a second season on August 4, 2016.
- The Middle—Renewed for an eighth season on March 3, 2016.
- Modern Family—Renewed for an eighth season on March 3, 2016.
- Once Upon a Time—Renewed for a sixth season on March 3, 2016.
- Quantico—Renewed for a second season on March 3, 2016.
- The Real O'Neals—Renewed for a second season on May 12, 2016.
- Scandal—Renewed for a sixth season on March 3, 2016.
- Shark Tank—Renewed for an eighth season on March 3, 2016.
- To Tell the Truth—Renewed for a second season on August 4, 2016.

==== CBS ====
- 2 Broke Girls—Renewed for a sixth season on March 25, 2016.
- 48 Hours—Renewed for a twenty-ninth season on May 18, 2016.
- 60 Minutes—Renewed for a forty-ninth season on May 18, 2016.
- The Amazing Race—Renewed for a twenty-ninth season on March 25, 2016.
- The Big Bang Theory—Renewed for a tenth season on March 12, 2014.
- Big Brother—Renewed for a nineteenth and twentieth season on August 10, 2016.
- Blue Bloods—Renewed for a seventh season on March 25, 2016.
- Code Black—Renewed for a second season on May 16, 2016.
- Criminal Minds—Renewed for a twelfth season on May 6, 2016.
- Criminal Minds: Beyond Borders— Renewed for a second season on May 16, 2016.
- Elementary—Renewed for a fifth season on March 25, 2016.
- Hawaii Five-0—Renewed for a seventh season on March 25, 2016.
- Life in Pieces—Renewed for a second season on May 11, 2016.
- Madam Secretary—Renewed for a third season on March 25, 2016.
- Mom—Renewed for a fourth season on March 25, 2016.
- NCIS—Renewed for a fourteenth season on February 29, 2016.
- NCIS: Los Angeles—Renewed for an eighth season on March 25, 2016.
- NCIS: New Orleans—Renewed for a third season on March 25, 2016.
- The Odd Couple—Renewed for a third season on May 16, 2016.
- Scorpion—Renewed for a third season on March 25, 2016.
- Supergirl—Renewed for a second season on May 12, 2016 and will be moved to The CW.
- Survivor—Renewed for a thirty-third season on March 25, 2016.
- Undercover Boss —Renewed for an eighth season on May 16, 2016.
- Zoo—Renewed for a third season on August 10, 2016.

==== The CW ====
- The 100—Renewed for a fourth season on March 11, 2016.
- Arrow—Renewed for a fifth season on March 11, 2016.
- Crazy Ex-Girlfriend—Renewed for a second season on March 11, 2016.
- The Flash—Renewed for a third season on March 11, 2016.
- iZombie—Renewed for a third season on March 11, 2016.
- Jane the Virgin—Renewed for a third season on March 11, 2016.
- Legends of Tomorrow—Renewed for a second season on March 11, 2016.
- The Originals—Renewed for a fourth season on March 11, 2016.
- Reign—Renewed for a fourth and final season on March 11, 2016.
- Supernatural—Renewed for a twelfth season on March 11, 2016.
- The Vampire Diaries—Renewed for an eighth and final season on March 11, 2016.

==== Fox ====
- American Grit—Renewed for a second season on July 29, 2016.
- Bob's Burgers—Renewed for a seventh season on October 7, 2015.
- Bones—Renewed for a twelfth and final season on February 25, 2016.
- Brooklyn Nine-Nine—Renewed for a fourth season on March 24, 2016.
- Empire—Renewed for a third season on January 15, 2016.
- Family Guy—Renewed for a fifteenth season on May 4, 2016.
- Gotham—Renewed for a third season on March 16, 2016.
- The Last Man on Earth—Renewed for a third season on March 24, 2016.
- Lucifer—Renewed for a second season on April 7, 2016.
- New Girl—Renewed for a sixth season on April 12, 2016.
- Rosewood—Renewed for a second season on April 7, 2016.
- Scream Queens—Renewed for a second season on January 15, 2016.
- So You Think You Can Dance—Renewed for a fourteenth season on January 30, 2017.
- Sleepy Hollow— Renewed for a fourth season on May 13, 2016.
- The Simpsons—Renewed for a twenty-eighth season on May 4, 2015.

==== NBC ====
- American Ninja Warrior—Renewed for a ninth season on September 12, 2016.
- America's Got Talent—Renewed for a twelfth season on August 2, 2016.
- Better Late Than Never—Renewed for a second season on September 22, 2016.
- The Blacklist—Renewed for a fourth season on December 7, 2015.
- Blindspot—Renewed for a second season on November 9, 2015.
- The Carmichael Show—Renewed for a third season on May 15, 2016.
- Caught on Camera with Nick Cannon—Renewed for a third season on May 15, 2016.
- Chicago Fire—Renewed for a fifth season on November 9, 2015.
- Chicago Med—Renewed for a second season on February 1, 2016.
- Chicago P.D.—Renewed for a fourth season on November 9, 2015.
- Football Night in America—Renewed for an eleventh season on December 14, 2011.
- Grimm—Renewed for a sixth and final season on April 5, 2016.
- Hollywood Game Night—Renewed for a fifth season on May 15, 2016.
- Law & Order: Special Victims Unit—Renewed for an eighteenth season on February 1, 2016.
- Little Big Shots—Renewed for a second season on March 14, 2016.
- NBC Sunday Night Football—Renewed for an eleventh season on December 14, 2011.
- The Night Shift—Renewed for a fourth season on November 17, 2016.
- Shades of Blue—Renewed for a second season on February 5, 2016.
- Spartan: Ultimate Team Challenge—Renewed for a second season on March 17, 2017.
- Superstore—Renewed for a second season on February 23, 2016.
- The Voice—Renewed for an eleventh season on March 25, 2016.

=== Cancellations/Series endings ===
==== ABC ====
- Agent Carter—Canceled on May 12, 2016 after two seasons.
- Blood & Oil—Canceled on May 12, 2016.
- Castle—Canceled on May 12, 2016 after eight seasons.
- The Family—Canceled on May 12, 2016.
- Galavant—Canceled on May 12, 2016 after two seasons.
- Mistresses—Canceled on September 9, 2016 after four seasons.
- The Muppets—Canceled on May 12, 2016.
- Nashville—Canceled on May 12, 2016 after four seasons. On June 9, 2016, it was announced that CMT would pick up the series for another season.
- Of Kings and Prophets—Canceled on March 17, 2016 after two episodes.
- Uncle Buck—Canceled on July 6, 2016.
- Wicked City—Canceled on November 13, 2015 after three episodes; aired full original run of episodes with remaining five carried on network website and Hulu. This was the first official cancellation of the season.

==== CBS ====
- American Gothic—Canceled on October 17, 2016.
- Angel from Hell—Canceled and pulled from the schedule on February 8, 2016 after five episodes. The remaining episodes burned off beginning July 2, 2016.
- BrainDead—Canceled on October 17, 2016.
- CSI: Crime Scene Investigation—It was announced on May 13, 2015 that season fifteen would be the final season. The series concluded on September 27, 2015.
- CSI: Cyber—Canceled on May 12, 2016 after two seasons.
- The Good Wife—It was announced on February 7, 2016 that season seven would be the final season. The series concluded on May 8, 2016.
- Limitless—Canceled on May 25, 2016.
- Mike & Molly—It was announced on January 12, 2016 that season six would be the final season. The series concluded on May 16, 2016.
- Person of Interest—It was announced on March 16, 2016 that season five would be the final season. The series concluded on June 21, 2016.
- Rush Hour—Canceled on May 16, 2016. The remaining episodes were burned off starting on July 23, 2016.

==== The CW ====
- America's Next Top Model—It was announced on October 14, 2015 that season 22 would be the final season. The series concluded on December 4, 2015. On February 23, 2016, it was announced that VH1 picked up the series for a new season.
- Beauty & the Beast—It was announced on October 13, 2015 that season four would be the final season. The series concluded on September 15, 2016.
- Containment—Canceled on May 12, 2016.

==== Fox ====
- American Idol—It was announced on May 11, 2015 that season fifteen would be the final season. The series concluded on April 7, 2016. On May 9, 2017, it was announced that ABC would revive for its sixteenth season.
- Bordertown—Canceled on May 12, 2016.
- Cooper Barrett's Guide to Surviving Life—Canceled on May 12, 2016.
- Coupled—Canceled on August 8, 2016.
- Grandfathered—Canceled on May 12, 2016.
- The Grinder—Canceled on May 12, 2016.
- Houdini and Doyle—Canceled on August 3, 2016.
- Minority Report—Canceled on May 13, 2016.
- Second Chance—Canceled on May 12, 2016.

==== NBC ====
- Aquarius—Canceled on October 1, 2016 after two seasons.
- Best Time Ever with Neil Patrick Harris—Canceled on December 15, 2015.
- Coach—It was announced on August 31, 2015 that production would not go forward, despite being previously ordered thirteen episodes, bypassing the pilot process, and already filming a single episode.
- Crowded—Canceled on May 13, 2016.
- Game of Silence—Canceled on May 13, 2016.
- Heartbeat—Canceled on May 13, 2016.
- Heroes Reborn—Canceled on January 13, 2016.
- The Mysteries of Laura—Canceled on May 14, 2016 after two seasons.
- The Player—Canceled on November 19, 2015.
- Telenovela—Canceled on May 13, 2016.
- Truth Be Told—Canceled on December 24, 2015.
- Undateable—Canceled on May 13, 2016 after three seasons.
- You, Me and the Apocalypse—Canceled on March 8, 2016.

== See also ==
- 2015–16 Canadian network television schedule
- 2015–16 United States network television schedule (daytime)
- 2015–16 United States network television schedule (late night)
