= 2016–17 United States network television schedule =

Television schedule for the fall of 2016

The 2016–17 network television schedule for the five major English-language commercial broadcast networks that air in the United States covers the prime time hours from September 2016 to August 2017. The schedule is followed by a list per network of returning series, new series, and series canceled after the 2015–16 season.

NBC was the first to announce its fall schedule, on May 15, 2016, followed by Fox on May 16, ABC on May 17, CBS on May 18 and The CW on May 19, 2016.

PBS is not included; member television stations have local flexibility over most of their schedules and broadcast times for network shows may vary. Ion Television, The CW Plus, and MyNetworkTV are also not included since the majority of the networks' schedules comprise syndicated reruns (with limited original programming on the latter two). The CW is not included on weekends since it does not carry network programming on those days.

New series are highlighted in bold. All times are U.S. Eastern and Pacific time (except for some live sports or events). Subtract one hour for Central and Mountain times.

Each of the 30 highest-rated shows is listed with its rank and rating as determined by Nielsen Media Research.

== Legend ==
- Light blue indicates local programming.
- Gray indicates encore programming.
- Blue-gray indicates news programming.
- Light green indicates live sporting events.
- Light purple indicates movies.
- Red indicates series being burned off and other irregularly scheduled programs, including specials.
- Yellow indicates the top-10 most watched programs of the season
- Cyan indicates the top-20 most watched programs of the season
- Magenta indicates the top-30 most watched programs of the season

== Sunday ==
Network		7:00 p.m.	7:30 p.m.	8:00 p.m.	8:30 p.m.	9:00 p.m.	9:30 p.m.	10:00 p.m.	10:30 p.m.
ABC	Fall	America's Funniest Home Videos		Once Upon a Time		Secrets and Lies		Quantico	
ABC	Winter	America's Funniest Home Videos		To Tell the Truth				**Conviction**	
ABC	Spring	America's Funniest Home Videos		Once Upon a Time		**Time After Time**		American Crime	
ABC	Mid-spring	America's Funniest Home Videos		Once Upon a Time		Match Game		American Crime	
ABC	Late spring	America's Funniest Home Videos		Celebrity Family Feud		**Steve Harvey's Funderdome**		The $100,000 Pyramid	
ABC	Summer	America's Funniest Home Videos		Celebrity Family Feud		**Steve Harvey's Funderdome**		The $100,000 Pyramid	
CBS	Fall	NFL on CBS	60 Minutes (11/7.7)		NCIS: Los Angeles (10/7.8)		Madam Secretary (17/6.9) (Tied with Criminal Minds)		Elementary (continued until 11:30 p.m.)
CBS	Winter	60 Minutes (11/7.7)		NCIS: Los Angeles (10/7.8)		Madam Secretary (17/6.9) (Tied with Criminal Minds)		Elementary	
CBS	Spring	60 Minutes (11/7.7)		NCIS: Los Angeles (10/7.8)		Madam Secretary (17/6.9) (Tied with Criminal Minds)		Elementary	
CBS	Summer	60 Minutes (11/7.7)		Big Brother		**Candy Crush**		NCIS: Los Angeles (R)	
Fox	Fall	Fox NFL	Bob's Burgers	The Simpsons	**Son of Zorn**	Family Guy	The Last Man on Earth	Local programming	
Fox	Winter	Animation Encores		The Simpsons	**Son of Zorn**	Family Guy	Bob's Burgers	Local programming	
Fox	Spring	Animation Encores	Bob's Burgers	The Simpsons	**Making History**	Family Guy	The Last Man on Earth	Local programming	
Fox	Summer	Bob's Burgers (R)	The Last Man on Earth (R)	The Simpsons	Family Guy (R)	American Grit		Local programming	
NBC	Fall	Football Night in America		NBC Sunday Night Football (8:20 p.m.) (continued to game completion) (3/11.1)					
NBC	Winter	Various programming							
NBC	Spring	Little Big Shots (R)		Little Big Shots (24/6.1) (Tied with MacGyver)		**Chicago Justice**		Shades of Blue	
NBC	Summer	**Sunday Night with Megyn Kelly**		**The Wall** (R)		American Ninja Warrior (R)			

== Monday ==
Network		8:00 pm	8:30 pm	9:00 pm	9:30 pm	10:00 pm	10:30 pm
ABC	Fall	Dancing with the Stars (9/8.1)				**Conviction**	
ABC	Late fall	The Great Christmas Light Fight				**Conviction**	
ABC	Winter	The Bachelor (29/5.8)				**Big Fan**	
ABC	Mid-winter	The Bachelor (29/5.8)				Quantico	
ABC	Spring	Dancing with the Stars (9/8.1)				Quantico	
ABC	Late spring	The Bachelorette				**Still Star-Crossed**	
ABC	Summer	The Bachelorette				Celebrity Family Feud (R)	
ABC	Mid-summer	The Bachelorette				To Tell the Truth	
ABC	Late summer	Bachelor in Paradise				To Tell the Truth	
CBS	Fall	The Big Bang Theory (1/11.5)	**Kevin Can Wait**	2 Broke Girls	The Odd Couple	Scorpion (19/6.7) (Tied with Empire)	
CBS	Mid-fall	**Kevin Can Wait**	**Man with a Plan**	2 Broke Girls	The Odd Couple	Scorpion (19/6.7) (Tied with Empire)	
CBS	Winter	**Kevin Can Wait**	**Man with a Plan**	**Superior Donuts**	2 Broke Girls	Scorpion (19/6.7) (Tied with Empire)	
CBS	Spring	**Kevin Can Wait**	**Man with a Plan**	**Superior Donuts**	2 Broke Girls	Scorpion (19/6.7) (Tied with Empire)	
CBS	Late spring	**Kevin Can Wait**	**Man with a Plan**	**Superior Donuts**	**The Great Indoors**	Scorpion (19/6.7) (Tied with Empire)	
CBS	Summer	**Kevin Can Wait**	**Man with a Plan**	Mom (R)	Life in Pieces (R)	Scorpion (19/6.7) (Tied with Empire)	
CBS	Mid-Summer	**Kevin Can Wait**	**Superior Donuts** (R)	Mom (R)	Life in Pieces (R)	**CBSN: On Assignment**	
The CW	Fall	Supergirl		Jane the Virgin		Local programming	
The CW	Winter	Supergirl		Jane the Virgin		Local programming	
The CW	Spring	Supergirl		Jane the Virgin		Local programming	
The CW	Summer	Supergirl		Whose Line Is It Anyway?	Whose Line Is It Anyway? (R)	Local programming	
The CW	Late summer	Supergirl		**Hooten & the Lady**		Local programming	
Fox	Fall	Gotham		Lucifer		Local programming	
Fox	Winter	**24: Legacy**		**APB**		Local programming	
Fox	Spring	Gotham		Lucifer		Local programming	
Fox	Summer	So You Think You Can Dance		**Superhuman**		Local programming	
Fox	Late-summer	So You Think You Can Dance				Local programming	
NBC	Fall	The Voice (12/7.6) (Tied with Hawaii Five-0)				**Timeless**	
NBC	Winter	The Apprentice				**Timeless**	
NBC	Late winter	The Voice (12/7.6) (Tied with Hawaii Five-0)				**Taken**	
NBC	Spring	The Voice (12/7.6) (Tied with Hawaii Five-0)				**Taken**	
NBC	Summer	American Ninja Warrior				Spartan: Ultimate Team Challenge	
NBC	Mid-summer	American Ninja Warrior				**Midnight, Texas**	

== Tuesday ==
Network		8:00 pm	8:30 pm	9:00 pm	9:30 pm	10:00 pm	10:30 pm
ABC	Fall	The Middle	**American Housewife**	Fresh Off the Boat	The Real O'Neals	Agents of S.H.I.E.L.D.	
ABC	Winter	The Middle	**American Housewife**	Fresh Off the Boat	The Real O'Neals	Agents of S.H.I.E.L.D.	
ABC	Spring	The Middle	**American Housewife**	Fresh Off the Boat	The Real O'Neals	**People Icons**	
ABC	Mid-spring	The Middle	**American Housewife**	Fresh Off the Boat	**Imaginary Mary**	Agents of S.H.I.E.L.D.	
ABC	Late spring	**Downward Dog**	The Middle (R)	Black-ish (R)		**American Housewife** (R)	Fresh Off the Boat (R)
ABC	Summer	The Middle (R)	Fresh Off the Boat (R)	Black-ish (R)		**Somewhere Between**	
ABC	Late summer	Bachelor in Paradise				**Somewhere Between**	
CBS	Fall	NCIS (2/11.4)		**Bull** (4/9.6) (Tied with Thursday Night Football)		NCIS: New Orleans (8/8.5)	
CBS	Winter	NCIS (2/11.4)		**Bull** (4/9.6) (Tied with Thursday Night Football)		NCIS: New Orleans (8/8.5)	
CBS	Spring	NCIS (2/11.4)		**Bull** (4/9.6) (Tied with Thursday Night Football)		NCIS: New Orleans (8/8.5)	
CBS	Summer	NCIS (2/11.4)		**Bull** (4/9.6) (Tied with Thursday Night Football)		**48 Hours: NCIS**	
The CW	Fall	The Flash		**No Tomorrow**		Local programming	
The CW	Winter	The Flash		Legends of Tomorrow		Local programming	
The CW	Spring	The Flash		iZombie		Local programming	
The CW	Summer	The Flash		iZombie		Local programming	
Fox	Fall	Brooklyn Nine-Nine	New Girl	Scream Queens		Local programming	
Fox	Winter	New Girl	**The Mick**	Bones		Local programming	
Fox	Spring	Brooklyn Nine-Nine	**The Mick**	Prison Break		Local programming	
Fox	Late Spring	Brooklyn Nine-Nine		Prison Break		Local programming	
Fox	Summer	**Lethal Weapon** (R)		**The Mick** (R)	Brooklyn Nine-Nine (R)	Local programming	
NBC	Fall	The Voice (15/7.4)				**This Is Us** (6/9.4)	
NBC	Mid-fall	The Voice (15/7.4)		**This Is Us** (6/9.4)		Chicago Fire (21/6.5)	
NBC	Winter	**The Wall**		**This Is Us** (6/9.4)		Chicago Fire (21/6.5)	
NBC	Spring	The Voice (15/7.4)		**Trial & Error**		Chicago Fire (21/6.5)	
NBC	Late spring	The Voice (15/7.4)		**Great News**		Chicago Fire (21/6.5)	
NBC	Summer	America's Got Talent				**World of Dance**	
NBC	Late summer	America's Got Talent				Hollywood Game Night	

Note: ABC aired Dancing with the Stars on Tuesday from September 20 to October 4.

== Wednesday ==
Network		8:00 pm	8:30 pm	9:00 pm	9:30 pm	10:00 pm	10:30 pm
ABC	Fall	The Goldbergs	**Speechless**	Modern Family	Black-ish	**Designated Survivor** (14/7.5)	
ABC	Winter	The Goldbergs	**Speechless**	Modern Family	Black-ish	Match Game	
ABC	Spring	The Goldbergs	**Speechless**	Modern Family	Black-ish	**Designated Survivor** (14/7.5)	
ABC	Summer	The Goldbergs	**Speechless**	Modern Family	**American Housewife** (R)	To Tell the Truth	
ABC	Late Summer	The Goldbergs	**Speechless**	Modern Family	**American Housewife** (R)	Modern Family (R)	The Goldbergs (R)
CBS	Fall	Survivor: Millennials vs. Gen X (22/6.2) (Tied with Chicago Med)		Criminal Minds (17/6.9) (Tied with Madam Secretary)		Code Black (26/6.0)	
CBS	Winter	Undercover Boss		Criminal Minds (17/6.9) (Tied with Madam Secretary)		Code Black (26/6.0)	
CBS	Late winter	**Hunted**		Criminal Minds (17/6.9) (Tied with Madam Secretary)		**Doubt**	
CBS	Spring	Survivor: Game Changers (22/6.2) (Tied with Chicago Med)		Criminal Minds (17/6.9) (Tied with Madam Secretary)		Criminal Minds: Beyond Borders	
CBS	Summer	Big Brother		**Salvation**		Criminal Minds (R)	
The CW	Fall	Arrow		**Frequency**		Local programming	
The CW	Winter	Arrow		The 100		Local programming	
The CW	Spring	Arrow		The 100		Local programming	
The CW	Summer	Arrow		The 100		Local programming	
Fox	Fall	**Lethal Weapon**		Empire (19/6.7) (Tied with Scorpion)		Local programming	
Fox	Winter	**Lethal Weapon**		**Star**		Local programming	
Fox	Spring	**Shots Fired**		Empire (19/6.7) (Tied with Scorpion)		Local programming	
Fox	Summer	Masterchef		**The F Word**		Local programming	
NBC	Fall	Blindspot		Law & Order: Special Victims Unit		Chicago P.D.	
NBC	Winter	Blindspot		Law & Order: Special Victims Unit		Chicago P.D.	
NBC	Spring	Blindspot		Law & Order: Special Victims Unit		Chicago P.D.	
NBC	Summer	Little Big Shots (24/6.1) (Tied with MacGyver)		The Carmichael Show	Superstore (R)	**This Is Us** (R)	
NBC	Mid-Summer	**Little Big Shots: Forever Young**		The Carmichael Show	The Carmichael Show (R)	**This Is Us** (R)	
NBC	Late summer	America's Got Talent		**Marlon**		Law & Order: Special Victims Unit (R)	

== Thursday ==
Network		8:00 pm	8:30 pm	9:00 pm	9:30 pm	10:00 pm	10:30 pm
ABC	Fall	Grey's Anatomy (16/7.3)		**Notorious**		How to Get Away with Murder	
ABC	Late fall	Holiday Specials		The Great American Baking Show			
ABC	Winter	Grey's Anatomy (16/7.3)		Scandal (30/5.7)		How to Get Away with Murder	
ABC	Spring	Grey's Anatomy (16/7.3)		Scandal (30/5.7)		The Catch	
ABC	Summer	**Boy Band**		**Battle of the Network Stars**		**The Gong Show**	
CBS	Fall	NFL Thursday Night Kickoff	Thursday Night Football (continued to game completion) (4/9.6) (Tied with Bull)				
CBS	Mid-fall	The Big Bang Theory (1/11.5)	**The Great Indoors**	Mom (27/5.9) (Tied with The Blacklist)	Life in Pieces	**Pure Genius**	
CBS	Winter	The Big Bang Theory (1/11.5)	**The Great Indoors**	Mom (27/5.9) (Tied with The Blacklist)	Life in Pieces	**Training Day**	
CBS	Spring	The Big Bang Theory (1/11.5)	**The Great Indoors**	Mom (27/5.9) (Tied with The Blacklist)	Life in Pieces	The Amazing Race	
CBS	Late spring	The Big Bang Theory (1/11.5)	The Big Bang Theory (R)	Mom (27/5.9) (Tied with The Blacklist)	Life in Pieces	The Amazing Race	
CBS	Summer	The Big Bang Theory (1/11.5)	Mom (R)	Big Brother		Zoo	
The CW	Fall	Legends of Tomorrow		Supernatural		Local programming	
The CW	Winter	Supernatural		**Riverdale**		Local programming	
The CW	Spring	Supernatural		**Riverdale**		Local programming	
The CW	Summer	Penn & Teller: Fool Us		**Hooten & the Lady**		Local programming	
The CW	Late summer	Penn & Teller: Fool Us		Whose Line Is It Anyway?	Whose Line Is It Anyway? (R)	Local programming	
Fox	Fall	Rosewood		**Pitch**		Local programming	
Fox	Winter	Hell's Kitchen		**My Kitchen Rules**		Local programming	
Fox	Mid-winter	MasterChef Junior		**My Kitchen Rules**		Local programming	
Fox	Spring	MasterChef Junior		**Kicking & Screaming**		Local programming	
Fox	Summer	**Beat Shazam**		**Love Connection**		Local programming	
NBC	Fall	Superstore	**The Good Place**	Chicago Med (22/6.2) (Tied with Survivor)		The Blacklist (27/5.9) (Tied with Mom)	
NBC	Late fall	Football Night in America	Thursday Night Football (continued to game completion) (4/9.6) (Tied with Bull)				
NBC	Winter	Superstore	**The Good Place**	Chicago Med (22/6.2) (Tied with Survivor)		The Blacklist (27/5.9) (Tied with Mom)	
NBC	Mid-winter	Superstore	**Powerless**	Chicago Med (22/6.2) (Tied with Survivor)		**The Blacklist: Redemption**	
NBC	Spring	Superstore (R)	Superstore	Chicago Med (22/6.2) (Tied with Survivor)		The Blacklist (27/5.9) (Tied with Mom)	
NBC	Summer	Hollywood Game Night		**The Wall**		The Night Shift	
NBC	Late summer	**The Wall**		Weekend Update; Summer Edition	**Great News** (R)	The Night Shift	

- Note: On both CBS and NBC, Thursday Night Kickoff/Football Night in... started at 7:30 p.m. ET out of primetime depending on the network carrying the game, pre-empting local programming. NBC's scheduling for the NFL's Kickoff Game and Thanksgiving night game was under the different Sunday Night Football package and game coverage filled the entirety of primetime.

== Friday ==
Network		8:00 pm	8:30 pm	9:00 pm	9:30 pm	10:00 pm	10:30 pm
ABC	Fall	Last Man Standing	Dr. Ken	Shark Tank		20/20	
ABC	Winter	Last Man Standing	Dr. Ken	Shark Tank		20/20	
ABC	Spring	**The Toy Box**		Shark Tank		20/20	
ABC	Summer	Shark Tank (R)		Primetime: What Would You Do?		20/20	
CBS	Fall	**MacGyver** (24/6.1) (Tied with Little Big Shots)		Hawaii Five-0 (12/7.6) (Tied with The Voice)		Blue Bloods (7/8.9)	
CBS	Winter	**MacGyver** (24/6.1) (Tied with Little Big Shots)		Hawaii Five-0 (12/7.6) (Tied with The Voice)		Blue Bloods (7/8.9)	
CBS	Spring	Undercover Boss		Hawaii Five-0 (12/7.6) (Tied with The Voice)		Blue Bloods (7/8.9)	
CBS	Summer	Undercover Boss		Hawaii Five-0 (12/7.6) (Tied with The Voice)		Blue Bloods (7/8.9)	
The CW	Fall	The Vampire Diaries		Crazy Ex-Girlfriend		Local programming	
The CW	Winter	The Vampire Diaries		Reign		Local programming	
The CW	Spring	The Originals		Reign		Local programming	
The CW	Summer	Masters of Illusion	Masters of Illusion (R)	Penn & Teller: Fool Us (R)		Local programming	
Fox	Fall	Hell's Kitchen		**The Exorcist**		Local programming	
Fox	Winter	Rosewood		Sleepy Hollow		Local programming	
Fox	Spring	Rosewood		**You the Jury**		Local programming	
Fox	Summer	Masterchef (R)		**Beat Shazam** (R)		Local programming	
NBC	Fall	Caught on Camera with Nick Cannon		Dateline NBC			
NBC	Winter	Grimm		**Emerald City**		Dateline NBC	
NBC	Mid-winter	Grimm		Dateline NBC			
NBC	Spring	**First Dates**		Dateline NBC			
NBC	Summer	America's Got Talent (R)				Dateline NBC (R)	

== Saturday ==
Network		8:00 pm	8:30 pm	9:00 pm	9:30 pm	10:00 pm	10:30 pm
ABC	Fall	ESPN Saturday Night Football (continued to game completion)					
ABC	Late fall	ABC Saturday Movie of the Week					
ABC	Winter	NBA Countdown	NBA Saturday Primetime				
ABC	Spring	NBA Countdown	NBA Saturday Primetime				
ABC	Summer	To Tell the Truth (R)		In an Instant			
ABC	Mid-Summer	In an Instant				**Still Star-Crossed**	
CBS	Fall	Crimetime Saturday				48 Hours	
CBS	Winter	**Ransom**		Crimetime Saturday		48 Hours	
CBS	Spring	Crimetime Saturday		**Training Day**		48 Hours	
CBS	Summer	**Doubt**				48 Hours	
Fox	Fall	Fox College Football (continued to game completion)					
Fox	Winter	Encore programming				Local programming	
Fox	Spring	Baseball Night in America				Local programming	
Fox	Summer	Encore programming				Local programming	
NBC	Fall	Dateline Saturday Mystery				SNL Vintage	
NBC	Winter	Dateline Saturday Mystery				SNL Vintage	
NBC	Spring	Encore programming				SNL Vintage	
NBC	Mid-spring	NHL on NBC (continued to game completion)					
NBC	Summer	Little Big Shots (R)		Dateline Saturday Mystery (R)			

- Note: NBC carried primetime coverage of Notre Dame college football and NASCAR some Saturday evenings through the fall, along with one January NFL Wild Card game, while CBS carried one January primetime NFL divisional playoff game and one November primetime SEC college football game.
- Note: NBC carried primetime coverage of some NHL games between February and June (including a regular-season Stadium Series game and some games in the Stanley Cup playoffs).
- Note: NBC's Pacific and Mountain Time Zone affiliates, beginning April 15, 2017, carried Saturday Night Live in real time with the rest of the United States, placing its airtime within the prime time period; a re-air was broadcast after the late local news in those time zones. The network's affiliates in Alaska, Hawaii and other Pacific islands carried the show on delay as usual.

== By network ==
=== ABC ===
Returning series:

- 20/20
- 20/20: In an Instant
- The $100,000 Pyramid
- ABC Saturday Movie of the Week
- Agents of S.H.I.E.L.D.
- America's Funniest Home Videos
- American Crime
- The Bachelor
- Bachelor in Paradise
- Battle of the Network Stars
- Black-ish
- The Catch
- Celebrity Family Feud
- Dancing with the Stars
- Dr. Ken
- Fresh Off the Boat
- The Goldbergs
- The Gong Show
- The Great American Baking Show
- The Great Christmas Light Fight
- Grey's Anatomy
- How to Get Away with Murder
- Last Man Standing
- Match Game
- The Middle
- Modern Family
- NBA Saturday Primetime
- Once Upon a Time
- Quantico
- The Real O'Neals
- Saturday Night Football
- Scandal
- Secrets and Lies
- Shark Tank
- To Tell the Truth
- What Would You Do?

New series:

- **American Housewife**
- **Big Fan** *
- **Boy Band** *
- **Conviction**
- **Designated Survivor**
- **Downward Dog** *
- **Imaginary Mary** *
- **Notorious**
- **Somewhere Between** *
- **Speechless**
- **Steve Harvey's Funderdome** *
- **Still Star-Crossed** *
- **Time After Time** *
- **The Toy Box** *
- **When We Rise** *

Not returning from 2015–16:

- 500 Questions
- Agent Carter
- Beyond the Tank
- Blood & Oil
- Boston EMS
- Castle
- The Family
- Galavant
- Mistresses
- The Muppets
- Nashville (moved to CMT)
- Of Kings and Prophets
- Uncle Buck
- Wicked City

=== CBS ===
Returning series:

- 2 Broke Girls
- 48 Hours
- 60 Minutes
- The Amazing Race
- The Big Bang Theory
- Big Brother
- Blue Bloods
- Code Black
- Criminal Minds
- Criminal Minds: Beyond Borders
- Elementary
- Hawaii Five-0
- Life in Pieces
- Madam Secretary
- Mom
- NCIS
- NCIS: Los Angeles
- NCIS: New Orleans
- The Odd Couple
- Scorpion
- Survivor
- Thursday Night Football (split with NBC)
- Undercover Boss
- Zoo

New series:

- **48 Hours: NCIS** *
- **Bull**
- **Candy Crush** *
- **CBSN: On Assignment** *
- **Doubt** *
- **The Good Fight** *
- **The Great Indoors**
- **Hunted** *
- **Kevin Can Wait**
- **MacGyver**
- **Man with a Plan**
- **Pure Genius**
- **Ransom** *
- **Salvation** *
- **Superior Donuts** *
- **Training Day** *

Not returning from 2015–16:

- American Gothic
- Angel from Hell
- BrainDead
- CSI: Crime Scene Investigation
- CSI: Cyber
- The Good Wife
- Limitless
- Mike & Molly
- Person of Interest
- Rush Hour
- Supergirl (moved to The CW)

=== The CW ===
Returning series:

- The 100
- Arrow
- Crazy Ex-Girlfriend
- The Flash
- iZombie
- Jane the Virgin
- Legends of Tomorrow
- Masters of Illusion
- The Originals
- Penn & Teller: Fool Us
- Reign
- Supergirl (moved from CBS)
- Supernatural
- The Vampire Diaries
- Whose Line Is It Anyway?

New series:

- **Frequency**
- **Hooten & the Lady** *
- **No Tomorrow**
- **Riverdale** *

Not returning from 2015–16:

- America's Next Top Model (moved to VH1)
- Beauty & the Beast
- Containment
- MADtv

=== Fox ===
Returning series:

- American Grit
- Bob's Burgers
- Bones
- Brooklyn Nine-Nine
- Empire
- Family Guy
- Fox College Football
- Gotham
- Hell's Kitchen
- The Last Man on Earth
- Lucifer
- MasterChef Junior
- New Girl
- NFL on Fox
- Prison Break
- Rosewood
- Scream Queens
- So You Think You Can Dance
- Sleepy Hollow
- The Simpsons

New series:

- **24: Legacy** *
- **APB** *
- **Beat Shazam** *
- **The Exorcist**
- **The F Word** *
- **Kicking & Screaming** *
- **Lethal Weapon**
- **Love Connection**
- **Making History** *
- **The Mick** *
- **My Kitchen Rules** *
- **Pitch**
- **Shots Fired** *
- **Son of Zorn**
- **Star** *
- **You the Jury** *

Not returning from 2015–16:

- American Idol (revived by ABC in 2017–18)
- Bordertown
- Cooper Barrett's Guide to Surviving Life
- Coupled
- Grandfathered
- The Grinder
- Houdini & Doyle
- Minority Report
- Second Chance
- Wayward Pines

=== NBC ===
Returning series:

- American Ninja Warrior
- America's Got Talent
- The Apprentice
- The Blacklist
- Blindspot
- The Carmichael Show
- Caught on Camera with Nick Cannon
- Chicago Fire
- Chicago Med
- Chicago P.D.
- Dateline NBC
- Football Night in America
- Grimm
- Hollywood Game Night
- Law & Order: Special Victims Unit
- Little Big Shots
- NBC Sunday Night Football
- The Night Shift
- Saturday Night Live Weekend Update Thursday
- Shades of Blue
- Spartan: Ultimate Team Challenge
- Superstore
- Thursday Night Football (split with CBS)
- The Voice

New series:

- **The Blacklist: Redemption** *
- **Chicago Justice** *
- **Emerald City** *
- **First Dates** *
- **The Good Place**
- **Great News** *
- **Little Big Shots: Forever Young** *
- **Marlon** *
- **Midnight, Texas** *
- **Powerless** *
- **Sunday Night with Megyn Kelly** *
- **Taken** *
- **This Is Us**
- **Timeless**
- **Trial & Error** *
- **The Wall**
- **World of Dance** *

Not returning from 2015–16:

- Aquarius
- Best Time Ever with Neil Patrick Harris
- Crowded
- Game of Silence
- Heartbeat
- Heroes Reborn
- Maya & Marty
- The Mysteries of Laura
- The Player
- Telenovela
- Truth Be Told
- Undateable
- You, Me and the Apocalypse

== Renewals and cancellations ==
=== Full season pickups ===
==== ABC ====
- American Housewife—Picked up for a 22-episode full season on November 4, 2016, an additional episode was ordered on December 13, 2016, totaling to 23 episodes.
- Designated Survivor—Picked up for a 22-episode full season on September 29, 2016.
- The Real O'Neals—Picked up for an additional three episodes on November 4, 2016, bringing the episode count up to 16.
- Speechless—Picked up for a 22-episode full season on September 29, 2016, an additional episode was ordered on December 13, 2016, totaling to 23 episodes.

==== CBS ====
- Bull—Picked up for a 22-episode full season on October 17, 2016.
- Code Black—Picked up for an additional three episodes on November 14, 2016, bringing the episode count up to 16.
- The Great Indoors—Picked up for a 19-episode full season on November 14, 2016, three additional episodes were ordered on January 6, 2017, totaling to 22 episodes.
- Kevin Can Wait—Picked up for a 22-episode full season on October 17, 2016, two additional episodes were ordered on January 6, 2017, bringing the episode count up to 24.
- MacGyver—Picked up for a 22-episode full season on October 17, 2016.
- Man with a Plan—Picked up for a 19-episode full season on November 14, 2016; three additional episodes were ordered on January 6, 2017, totaling to 22 episodes.

==== The CW ====
- Legends of Tomorrow—Picked up for an additional four episodes on November 9, 2016, bringing the episode count up to 17.

==== Fox ====
- Lethal Weapon—Picked up for an 18-episode full season on October 12, 2016.
- Lucifer—Picked up for a 22-episode full season on October 31, 2016.
- The Mick—Picked up for a 17-episode full season on January 11, 2017.

==== NBC ====
- Superstore—Picked up for a 22-episode full season on September 23, 2016.
- This Is Us—Picked up for an 18-episode full season on September 27, 2016.
- Timeless—Picked up for a 16-episode full season on November 1, 2016.

=== Renewals ===
==== ABC ====
- The $100,000 Pyramid—Renewed for a third season on August 6, 2017.
- Agents of S.H.I.E.L.D.—Renewed for a fifth season on May 11, 2017.
- America's Funniest Home Videos—Renewed for a twenty-eighth season on May 12, 2017.
- American Housewife—Renewed for a second season on May 11, 2017.
- The Bachelor—Renewed for a twenty-second season on May 11, 2017.
- Black-ish—Renewed for a fourth season on May 10, 2017.
- Celebrity Family Feud—Renewed for a fifth season on August 6, 2017.
- Dancing with the Stars—Renewed for a twenty-fifth season on May 11, 2017.
- Designated Survivor—Renewed for a second season on May 11, 2017.
- Fresh Off the Boat—Renewed for a fourth season on May 12, 2017.
- The Goldbergs—Renewed for a fifth and sixth season on May 11, 2017.
- The Gong Show—Renewed for a second season on January 8, 2018.
- Grey's Anatomy—Renewed for a fourteenth season on February 10, 2017.
- How to Get Away with Murder—Renewed for a fourth season on February 10, 2017.
- Match Game—Renewed for a third season on August 6, 2017.
- The Middle—Renewed for a ninth and final season on January 25, 2017.
- Modern Family—Renewed for a ninth and tenth season on May 10, 2017
- Once Upon a Time—Renewed for a seventh and final season on May 11, 2017.
- Quantico—Renewed for a third season on May 15, 2017.
- Scandal—Renewed for a seventh and final season on February 10, 2017.
- Shark Tank—Renewed for a ninth season on May 11, 2017.
- Speechless—Renewed for a second season on May 12, 2017.
- The Toy Box—Renewed for a second season on June 16, 2017.

==== CBS ====
- 48 Hours—Renewed for a thirtieth season on March 23, 2017.
- 60 Minutes—Renewed for a fiftieth season on March 23, 2017.
- The Amazing Race—Renewed for a thirtieth season on May 13, 2017.
- The Big Bang Theory—Renewed for an eleventh and twelfth season on March 20, 2017.
- Big Brother—Renewed for a twentieth season on August 10, 2016.
- Blue Bloods—Renewed for an eighth season on March 23, 2017.
- Bull—Renewed for a second season on March 23, 2017.
- Code Black—Renewed for a third season on May 14, 2017.
- Criminal Minds—Renewed for a thirteenth season on April 7, 2017.
- Elementary—Renewed for a sixth season on May 13, 2017.
- Hawaii Five-0—Renewed for an eighth season on March 23, 2017.
- Kevin Can Wait—Renewed for a second season on March 23, 2017.
- Life in Pieces—Renewed for a third season on March 23, 2017.
- MacGyver—Renewed for a second season on March 23, 2017.
- Madam Secretary—Renewed for a fourth season on March 23, 2017.
- Man with a Plan—Renewed for a second season on March 23, 2017.
- Mom—Renewed for a fifth season on March 23, 2017.
- NCIS—Renewed for a fifteenth season on February 29, 2016.
- NCIS: Los Angeles—Renewed for a ninth season on March 23, 2017.
- NCIS: New Orleans—Renewed for a fourth season on March 23, 2017.
- Ransom—Renewed for a second season on October 10, 2017.
- Salvation—Renewed for a second season on October 18, 2017.
- Scorpion—Renewed for a fourth season on March 23, 2017.
- Superior Donuts—Renewed for a second season on March 23, 2017.
- Survivor—Renewed for a thirty-fifth season on March 23, 2017.
- Thursday Night Football—Renewed for a fourth season with CBS and second season with NBC, as part of a new split contract on February 1, 2016.
- Undercover Boss—Renewed for a ninth season on May 17, 2017.

==== The CW ====
- The 100—Renewed for a fifth season on March 10, 2017.
- Arrow—Renewed for a sixth season on January 8, 2017.
- Crazy Ex-Girlfriend—Renewed for a third season on January 8, 2017.
- iZombie—Renewed for a fourth season on May 10, 2017.
- The Flash—Renewed for a fourth season on January 8, 2017.
- Jane the Virgin—Renewed for a fourth season on January 8, 2017.
- Legends of Tomorrow—Renewed for a third season on January 8, 2017.
- The Originals—Renewed for a fifth and final season on May 10, 2017.
- Riverdale—Renewed for a second season on March 7, 2017.
- Supergirl—Renewed for a third season on January 8, 2017.
- Supernatural—Renewed for a thirteenth season on January 8, 2017.

==== Fox ====
- Beat Shazam—Renewed for a second season on July 12, 2017.
- Bob's Burgers—Renewed for an eighth season on October 7, 2015.
- Brooklyn Nine-Nine—Renewed for a fifth season on May 12, 2017.
- Empire—Renewed for a fourth season on January 11, 2017.
- The Exorcist—Renewed for a second season on May 12, 2017.
- Family Guy—Renewed for a sixteenth season on May 15, 2017.
- Gotham—Renewed for a fourth season on May 10, 2017.
- Hell's Kitchen—Renewed for a seventeenth and eighteenth season on September 9, 2016.
- The Last Man on Earth—Renewed for a fourth season on May 10, 2017.
- Lethal Weapon—Renewed for a second season on February 22, 2017.
- Love Connection—Renewed for a second season on August 10, 2017.
- Lucifer—Renewed for a third season on February 13, 2017.
- The Mick—Renewed for a second season on February 21, 2017.
- New Girl—Renewed for a seventh and final season on May 14, 2017.
- The Simpsons—Renewed for a twenty-ninth and thirtieth season on November 4, 2016.
- So You Think You Can Dance—Renewed for fifteenth season on February 16, 2018.
- Star—Renewed for a second season on February 22, 2017.

==== NBC ====
- America's Got Talent—Renewed for a thirteenth season on February 21, 2018.
- The Blacklist—Renewed for a fifth season on May 11, 2017.
- Blindspot—Renewed for a third season on May 10, 2017.
- Chicago Fire—Renewed for a sixth season on May 10, 2017.
- Chicago Med—Renewed for a third season on May 10, 2017.
- Chicago P.D.—Renewed for a fifth season on May 10, 2017.
- Football Night in America—Renewed for a twelfth season on December 14, 2011.
- The Good Place— Renewed for a second season on January 30, 2017.
- Great News—Renewed for a second season on May 11, 2017.
- Hollywood Game Night—Renewed for a sixth season on March 19, 2018.
- Law & Order: Special Victims Unit—Renewed for a nineteenth season on May 12, 2017.
- Little Big Shots—Renewed for a third season on May 14, 2017.
- Marlon—Renewed for a second season on September 28, 2017.
- Midnight, Texas—Renewed for a second season on February 14, 2018.
- NBC Sunday Night Football—Renewed for a twelfth season on December 14, 2011.
- Shades of Blue—Renewed for a third season on March 17, 2017.
- Superstore—Renewed for a third season on February 14, 2017.
- Taken—Renewed for a second season on May 9, 2017.
- This Is Us—Renewed for a second and third season on January 18, 2017.
- Thursday Night Football—Renewed for a fourth season with CBS and second season with NBC, as part of a new split contract on February 1, 2016.
- Timeless—Renewed for a second season on May 13, 2017, three days after initially being canceled.
- Trial & Error—Renewed for a second season on May 20, 2017.
- The Voice—Renewed for a thirteenth season on October 18, 2016.
- The Wall—Renewed for a second and third season on May 14, 2017.
- World of Dance—Renewed for a second season on June 29, 2017.

=== Cancellations/series endings ===
==== ABC ====
- American Crime—Canceled on May 11, 2017, after three seasons.
- The Catch—Canceled on May 11, 2017, after two seasons.
- Conviction—Canceled on May 11, 2017.
- Downward Dog—Canceled on June 23, 2017.
- Dr. Ken—Canceled on May 11, 2017, after two seasons.
- Imaginary Mary—Canceled on May 11, 2017. The series concluded on May 30, 2017.
- Last Man Standing—Canceled on May 10, 2017, after six seasons. On May 11, 2018, it was announced that Fox would pick up the series for another season.
- Notorious—Canceled on May 11, 2017.
- The Real O'Neals—Canceled on May 11, 2017, after two seasons.
- Secrets and Lies—Canceled on May 11, 2017, after two seasons.
- Time After Time—Canceled on March 29, 2017, after five low rated episodes.

==== CBS ====
- 2 Broke Girls—Canceled on May 12, 2017, after six seasons.
- Criminal Minds: Beyond Borders—Canceled on May 14, 2017, after two seasons.
- Doubt—Canceled on February 24, 2017, after two low rated episodes. This was the first cancellation of the season.
- The Great Indoors—Canceled on May 13, 2017.
- The Odd Couple—Canceled on May 15, 2017, after three seasons.
- Pure Genius—Canceled on May 16, 2017.
- Training Day—Canceled on May 17, 2017. This decision was made after star Bill Paxton's untimely death on February 25, 2017.
- Zoo—Canceled on October 23, 2017, after three seasons.

==== The CW ====
- Frequency—Canceled on May 8, 2017.
- Hooten & the Lady— Canceled on August 2, 2017.
- No Tomorrow—Canceled on May 8, 2017.
- Reign—It was announced on December 7, 2016, that season four would be the final season. The series concluded on June 16, 2017.
- The Vampire Diaries—It was announced on July 23, 2016, that season eight would be the final season. The series concluded on March 10, 2017.

==== Fox ====
- 24: Legacy—Canceled on June 7, 2017.
- APB—Canceled on May 11, 2017.
- Bones—It was announced on February 25, 2016, that season twelve would be the final season. The series concluded on March 28, 2017.
- Making History—Canceled on May 11, 2017. The series concluded on May 21, 2017.
- Pitch—Canceled on May 1, 2017.
- Prison Break—The revival was meant to run for one season only; it concluded on May 30, 2017.
- Rosewood—Canceled on May 9, 2017, after two seasons.
- Scream Queens—Canceled on May 15, 2017, after two seasons.
- Sleepy Hollow—Canceled on May 9, 2017, after four seasons.
- Son of Zorn—Canceled on May 11, 2017.
- You the Jury—Canceled on May 1, 2017, after two episodes.

==== NBC ====
- The Apprentice—Canceled on August 3, 2017, after fifteen seasons.
- The Blacklist: Redemption—Canceled on May 12, 2017.
- The Carmichael Show—Canceled on June 30, 2017, after three seasons. The series concluded on August 9, 2017.
- Chicago Justice—Canceled on May 22, 2017.
- Emerald City—Canceled on May 4, 2017.
- Grimm—It was announced on August 29, 2016, that season six would be the final season. The series concluded on March 31, 2017.
- The Night Shift—Canceled on October 13, 2017, after four seasons.
- Powerless—Pulled from the schedule on April 25, 2017, after nine episodes. It was later canceled on May 11, 2017.

== See also ==
- 2016–17 Canadian network television schedule
- 2016–17 United States network television schedule (daytime)
- 2016–17 United States network television schedule (late night)
