= Salt Lake City Public Library hostage incident =

1994 attack in Utah, US

- Location: 40°45′32″N 111°53′04″W; Salt Lake City, Utah, U.S.
- Date: March 5, 1994
- Attack type: Hostage
- Deaths: 1 (the perpetrator)
- Perpetrator: Clifford Lynn Draper
- Defender: Lt. Lloyd Prescott

The Salt Lake City Public Library hostage incident occurred on March 5, 1994, in Salt Lake City, Utah, United States, when Clifford Lynn Draper held several hostages on the second floor in the former main branch of the Salt Lake City Public Library, which now houses The Leonardo, a culture and arts center.

== Incident ==
During a demonstration of a Tibetan sand painting ceremony, Draper leapt up on the service desk in the Fiction section brandishing a M1911 pistol and claiming to have a bomb. He ordered nearby people into a conference room, which was already occupied by a Toastmasters group: librarian Gwen Page, six civilians, and Salt Lake County Sheriff's Lt. Lloyd Prescott, who offered to change places with the last person who entered the conference room.

Lt. Prescott was in plain clothes at the time and had his pistol hidden on his person. After Draper and the others entered the room Page began to count hostages, as ordered, and began to have them line up facing the wall while Draper made demands and described his plans. A Toastmaster managed to inconspicuously slip several hostages out a second door in the conference room, inciting a run for more hostages to exit the commons. Page and others chose to stay in the room while Draper threatened but did not shoot.

=== Staff response ===
The library staff acted quickly by calling 911 and evacuating the five-story building in under five minutes, by using the fire alarm. Several staff stayed on-site to provide police with floor plans and operating the telephone, security and power lines according to the wishes of the SWAT teams.

One librarian, Jenny Wright, hid a group of eight children and their parents from the Children's Section (located on the second floor near Draper) in another conference room until Draper was satisfied with the number of hostages and had closed the door and had lowered blinds over the room's glass walls. Another librarian arrived and the group was led to safety through an exit in the staff area of the building.

=== Bomb ===
Draper placed what he claimed was a bomb on the table in the center of the conference room. It was equipped with a dead man's switch which would cause it to detonate if Draper released a hand-held button. For this reason, Lt. Prescott hesitated to use force, and the incident lasted more than six hours, during which Draper made demands for cash, gold and platinum bullion, back-pay for prior military service, and a full presidential pardon from President Bill Clinton.

At one point, Draper had one of the hostages put more duct tape on the homemade bomb because he feared the two contact points for the detonator would spontaneously close. After this, he announced that everyone would draw straws to determine the order in which they would be shot until his demands were met. Lt. Prescott decided to risk the chance that the thick oak table the bomb was situated on would be able to shield the hostages if they could get under it in time. Just as Draper was seen crouching with another hostage to check the bomb detonator, Lt. Prescott seized his chance. He drew his pistol and, while shouting at the other hostages to get on the floor, fired five times at Draper while SWAT members crashed through the glass walls of the conference room. Draper was hit by all five bullets and fell to the floor, mortally wounded. Despite the dead man's switch, the bomb did not detonate as Draper had overtaped the device's mechanism. Draper was rushed to nearby LDS Hospital where he was pronounced dead on arrival.

The bomb turned out to be real and was determined to be modeled after a Vietnam War-era anti-personnel claymore mine that would have been particularly deadly if it had gone off. The Salt Lake City Police Department's bomb squad deemed it too volatile to move, and it was detonated inside the conference room. None of the shrapnel penetrated the table, verifying Lt. Prescott's hypothesis.

== Legacy ==
The incident was dramatized in a 1996 episode of Rescue 911, a 2009 episode of I Survived..., a 2017 episode of the ABC series In an Instant, and a 2019 episode of I, Hostage.
