= Strong (TV series) =

2016 American competition reality television series

- Created by: Dave Broome
- Presented by: Gabrielle Reece
- Starring: See below
- Country of origin: United States
- Original language: English
- No. of seasons: 1
- No. of episodes: 10

Production
- Executive producers: Dave Broome; Kevin King-Templeton; Sylvester Stallone; Holly Wofford
- Running time: 60 minutes
- Production companies: 25/7 Productions; Lake Paradise Entertainment; Sony Pictures Television

Original release
- Network: NBC
- Release: April 13 – June 2, 2016

Strong (stylized onscreen as S.T.R.O.N.G.) is an American competition reality television series that aired on NBC from April 13 to June 2, 2016. It was hosted by former professional volleyball player Gabrielle Reece.

== Premise ==
Strong features 20 contestants: 10 male trainers and 10 female trainees. The trainers help their trainees improve physical fitness, focusing not only on weight loss but also, according to the series, "achieving a balance between mind and body, and getting into shape both physically and mentally". In each episode, teams train and compete in physical challenges across disciplines such as mixed martial arts, strength and endurance training, and boxing. After challenges, two teams face off in a physical competition in the Elimination Tower; the losing team is eliminated from the series. The winning team receives a cash prize of up to $500,000, dependent on their overall performance.

== Contestants ==
The contestants for season one of Strong were:

=== Trainers ===
- Leyon Azubuike (33), a professional strength and condition coach from Santa Monica, California
- Todd Durkin (44), a personal trainer and author from San Diego
- Ky Evans (43), a personal trainer and ballet dancer from Marina del Rey, California
- Drew Logan (41), a celebrity trainer and nutrition expert from Manhattan Beach, California
- Mathew Miller (34), a strength and conditioning coach from Las Vegas
- Wesley Okerson (37), a personal trainer from Los Angeles
- Adam Von Rothfelder (33), a strength trainer and former MMA fighter from Milwaukee
- Chris Ryan (35), a personal trainer and fitness model from New York City
- Dan Wells (41), a gym franchise owner from Studio City, Los Angeles
- Bennie Wylie (39), a strength and conditioning trainer from Tuscola, Texas

=== Trainees ===
- Brittany Harrell-Miller (26), algebra teacher from Lawrence, Kansas
- Jill May, mother from Minnesota

== Teams ==
Team	Episode									
Team	1	2	3	4	5	6	7	8	9	10
Bennie & Jill	E.T.	$25,000	SAFE	$25,000	E.T.	SAFE	SAFE	SAFE	$50,000	WINNER
Todd	On Different Teams					WIN	E.T.	E.T.	E.T.	RUNNER-UP
Brittany	On Different Teams					WIN	E.T.	E.T.	E.T.	RUNNER-UP
Mat & Nicole	SAFE	E.T.	$25,000	WIN	SAFE	E.T.	SAFE	$25,000	ELIM	
Wes & Jasmine	SAFE	SAFE	E.T.	E.T.	WIN	$25,000	$25,000	ELIM		
Dan & Mahogany	SAFE	SAFE	SAFE	SAFE	SAFE	SAFE	ELIM			
Chris & Giovanna	SAFE	SAFE	SAFE	SAFE	$25,000	ELIM				
Adam & "CC"	WIN	WIN	SAFE	SAFE	ELIM	LOST (Note: Adam was not medically cleared to compete. Therefore, Adam had no chance of returning to the competition.)				
Ky (with Brittany)	SAFE	SAFE	WIN	ELIM		LOST				
Devon (with Todd)	SAFE	SAFE	ELIM			LOST				
Drew & Sarah	SAFE	ELIM				LOST				
Leyon & Victoria	ELIM					LOST				

The team won Strong.
The team was the runner-up of Strong.
The team won the power challenge and sent someone to the elimination tower.
The team came in last in the medallion challenge, but saved themselves by winning the power challenge and chose two teams to compete in the elimination tower.
The team won the medallion challenge and gained immunity for the week. Starting Week 5, the Power Challenge and the Medallion Challenge were merged into the Ultimate Challenge. The winner of the Ultimate Challenge gets to choose one team to compete in the elimination tower against the last-place finisher.
The contestant won entry back into the competition.
The contestant came back for a chance to win re-entry into the competition, lost, and was eliminated again.
The team was sent to the elimination tower by the winning team, but was not eliminated.
The team lost the medallion challenge, was sent to the elimination tower, and was not eliminated.
The team was sent to the elimination tower by the winning team, and was eliminated.
The team lost the medallion challenge, was sent to the elimination tower, and was eliminated.

=== Team Medallions ===
Team	Medallions	Money in Final
Bennie & Jill	4 Challenge Medallions; 1 Challenge Medallion from Gray Team; 7 Team Medallions	$300,000 (Won)
Todd	4 Challenge Medallions; 4 Team Medallions	~~$200,000 (Lost)~~
Brittany	4 Challenge Medallions; 4 Team Medallions	~~$200,000 (Lost)~~
Mat & Nicole	Gave Purple, Orange, and Lime Team Medallions to the Blue Team. & Gave 4 Challenge Medallions to the Yellow Team.	Eliminated; Episode 9
Wes & Jasmine	Gave Gray, Yellow, and White Team Medallions to the Yellow Team. & Gave 1 Challenge Medallion each to the Purple and Blue Teams.	Eliminated; Episode 8
Dan & Mahogany	Gave Lime Team Medallion to the Purple Team. & Gave White Team Medallion to the Gray Team.	Eliminated; Episode 7
Chris & Giovanna	Gave Orange Team Medallion to the Purple Team. & Gave 1 Challenge Medallion to the Purple Team.	Eliminated; Episode 6
Adam & "CC"	Gave White Team Medallion to the Lime Team.	Eliminated; Episode 5
Ky (with Brittany)	Gave Yellow Team Medallion to the Gray Team & Gave Red Team Medallion to the Blue Team.	Eliminated; Episode 4
Devon (with Todd)	Gave Olive Team Medallion to the Blue Team.	Eliminated; Episode 3
Drew & Sarah	Gave Red Team Medallion to the Yellow Team.	Eliminated; Episode 2
Leyon & Victoria	Gave Aqua Team Medallion to the Blue Team.	Eliminated; Episode 1

== Production ==
Executive producers included Dave Broome, creator of the competition reality series The Biggest Loser,, and Holly Wofford, a producer on the sports competition show American Ninja Warrior. Other executive producers included Sylvester Stallone and Kevin King-Templeton, who also collaborated on the sports drama film Creed (2015). The series was produced by Sony Pictures Television in association with 25/7 Productions.

Paul Telegdy, NBC president of alternative and late-night programming, stated that American Ninja Warrior prompted interest in Strong and that pitches for shows were considered based on the question: "If there was a show that would get people ready to be a contestant on American Ninja Warrior, what would it be?" Host Gabrielle Reece described the show's physical challenges as a "high level of difficulty" and said of the series,: "I think it has a really human quality to it. The cast's stories are stories that everyone can relate to."

The series debuted with back-to-back episodes as a sneak preview on April 13, 2016, before moving to its regular timeslot on Thursdays at 8 p.m. The sneak preview followed a live episode of the NBC musical competition series The Voice. It preceded The Blacklist in the NBC schedule. Strong was the third show to air in NBC's Thursday 8 p.m. timeslot that season, following Heroes Reborn and You, Me and the Apocalypse. According to The Hollywood Reporter, the title Strong is an acronym for 'Start to Realize Our Natural Greatness'.

== Episodes ==
No.	Title	Original release date	U.S. viewers (millions)
1	"Welcome to Strong"	April 13, 2016	3.33
In the series premiere, ten women and ten elite male trainers arrive at the compound to begin the grueling strength and conditioning challenges.
2	"Balls to the Wall"	April 13, 2016	3.33
The teams battle in the first Medallion Challenge and tempers flare between one team and their trainer.
3	"Friends and Frenemies"	April 14, 2016	3.28
Upper body strength is tested in the most grueling challenge to date and friendships are strained as the first trainee-only power challenge begins.
4	"Don't Give Up the Fight"	April 21, 2016	3.04
The remaining teams compete in a Medallion Challenge that could send one pair to the Elimination Tower for a second time. Later, Adam and CC's relationship is tested; the trainers face off in a Power Challenge; and two teams fight to stay in the game.
5	"Power Play"	April 28, 2016	2.66
The pairs compete in a Medallion Challenge that tests upper-body strength and communication skills. Later, the ladies face off in an All-Women's Power Challenge; and two rival teams fight for their chance to stay in the game at the Elimination Tower.
6	"Second Chances"	May 5, 2016	2.55
All of the eliminated players return and compete for the opportunity to re-enter the game with the fastest male and fastest female creating the returning team. Later, old conflicts are rekindled; one player's injury forces him to leave the competition; and two teams face off in the Elimination Tower.
7	"Pay the Piper"	May 12, 2016	2.60
The five remaining teams compete for a spot in the final four; one pair's relationship strengthens; and a trainee becomes overwhelmed with pressure. Later, two teams fight to stay in the competition at the Elimination Tower.
8	"Four the Win"	May 19, 2016	2.49
The final four teams compete in an Ultimate Challenge in hopes of advancing to the top three. Later, the competitors reveal their motivations to win.
9	"Close Enough to Grab"	May 26, 2016	2.57
The final three teams compete in the last Ultimate Challenge to earn their spot in the finale, but an injury could prevent one team from making it to the end. Later, two teams face off in hopes of securing their place in the Strong Championship.
10	"The Final Showdown"	June 2, 2016	2.66
In the first-season finale, the two remaining teams are pushed to their limits during the three rigorous stages of the finals. Later, the blue team is crowned the winner of the competition and awarded the grand prize.
