= The Biggest Loser season 17 =

The Biggest Loser
- Season 17
- No. of episodes: 8

Release
- Original network: NBC
- Original release: January 4 – February 22, 2016

Season chronology
- ← Previous; Season 16 (Glory Days) Next → Season 18

The Biggest Loser: Temptation Nation is the 17th season of The Biggest Loser which premiered January 4, 2016, on NBC. Dolvett Quince and Jennifer Widerstrom returned as trainers, while former trainer Bob Harper takes over Alison Sweeney as host. The contestants competed to win a $250,000 prize which was awarded to Roberto Hernandez, the contestant with the highest percentage of weight loss.

The cast was announced on December 1 and includes Survivor: Borneo winner Richard Hatch and The Voice season two semi-finalist Erin Willett.

This season's theme is temptation and indulgences, including not just food but money, electronics and shopping.

== Contestants ==
Contestant	Couples Teams	Black vs. Red	Black vs. Red 2	Singles	Status	Total votes
Britney Anderson, 27, Kissimmee, FL	Blue Team	Red Team	—N/a	—N/a	Eliminated Week 1	4
Whitney Clay, 30, Raleigh, NC	Purple Team	Red Team	—N/a	—N/a	Eliminated Week 2	3
Hope Wright, 35, K'Ville, GA	Orange Team	Black Team	—N/a	—N/a	Eliminated Week 3	3
Richard Hatch, 54, Middletown, RI	White Team	Red Team	—N/a	—N/a	Eliminated Week 4	0 ^[R]
Sarah Gilbert, 27, Perry, GA	Yellow Team	Black Team	Red Team	—N/a	Eliminated Week 5	0 ^[R]
Tonsheia "Toy" Grandison, 35, Statesboro, GA	Blue Team	Red Team	Black Team	—N/a	Eliminated Week 6	3
Vicki Clark, 54, Bladenboro, NC	Pink Team	Black Team	Black Team	—N/a	Eliminated Week 7	4
Robert "Rob" Kidney, 56, Warner Robins, GA	Yellow Team	Black Team	Red Team	—N/a	Eliminated Week 8	0 ^[R]
Luis Hernandez, 36, Chicago, IL	Green Team	Black Team	Black Team	Green	Eliminated Week 9	4
Lauren Clark, 32, Bladenboro, NC	Pink Team	Black Team	Black Team	Pink	Eliminated Week 10	5
Erin Willett, 26, Brooklyn, NY	White Team	Red Team	Black Team	White	Eliminated Week 11	3
Felicia Buffkin, 29, Raleigh, NC	Purple Team	Red Team	Red Team	Purple	Eliminated Week 12	0 ^[R]
Jacquelyne "Jacky" Kmet, 42, Hainesport, NJ	Gray Team	Red Team	Red Team	Gray	Eliminated Week 12	0 ^[R]
Colby Wright, 31, K'Ville, GA	Orange Team	Black Team	Black Team	Orange	Third Placer	0
Stephen "Steve" Kmet †, 43, Hainesport, NJ	Gray Team	Red Team	Red Team	Gray	Runner-Up	0
Roberto Hernandez, 36, Burbank, IL	Green Team	Black Team	Red Team	Green	Biggest Loser	0

Teams
Team Dolvett
Team Jen

The "Total Votes" column indicates the number of votes cast against the contestant when he/she was eliminated.
^[Q] This contestant quit the competition.
^[R] This contestant fell below the Red Line, and was eliminated without any votes.
^[E1] This contestant lost a weigh-in and was eliminated without any votes, due to having the lower percentage of weight loss on a team with just two remaining contestants.
^[C] This contestant was eliminated due to losing an Elimination Challenge.

== Weigh-ins ==
Contestant	Age	Height	Starting BMI	Ending BMI	Starting weight	Week											Semi- final	Finale	Weight lost	Percentage lost
Contestant	Age	Height	Starting BMI	Ending BMI	Starting weight	1	2	3	4	5	6	7	8	9	10	11	Semi- final	Finale	Weight lost	Percentage lost
Roberto	36	5'10"	49.9	27.0	348	324	315	308	300	291	283	276	265	259	250	240	234	188	160	45.98%
Stephen	43	5'11"	43.1	24.5	309	298	289	283	277	269	259	253	245	238	228	219	209	176	133	43.04%
Colby	31	6'0"	46.0	29.4	339	321	309	300	288	282	278	271	265	258	249	238	229	217	122	35.99%
Jacky	42	5'9"	44.9	27.6	304	290	287	278	269	265	258	251	244	238	229	221	215	187	117	38.49%
Felicia	29	5'5"	38.9	29.6	234	220	216	209	205	202	195	191	187	185	183	179	176	178	56	23.93%
Erin	26	5'8"	36.2	23.0	238	228	222	216	210	205	200	199	196	188	182	179		151	87	36.55%
Lauren	32	5'4"	40.2	28.7	234	223	215	211	206	202	199	194	187	184	179			167	67	28.63%
Luis	36	5'10"	44.2	24.2	308	285	278	273	267	260	250	244	233	232				169	139	45.13%
Rob	56	5'10"	46.8	30.1	326	306	299	289	286	278	268	262	259					210	116	35.58%
Vicki	54	5'3"	42.0	31.2	237	226	220	214	210	205	202	198						176	61	25.74%
Toy	35	5'4"	54.2	39.8	316	308	302	295	288	282	278							232	84	26.58%
Sarah	27	5'2"	48.8	27.1	267	250	244	237	229	226								148	119	44.57%
Richard	54	6'4"	38.2	32.7	314	301	294	285	280									269	45	14.33%
Hope	35	5'4"	39.8	33.0	232	222	220	218										192	40	17.24%
Whitney	30	5'11"	35.3	27.5	253	243	243											197	56	22.13%
Britney	27	5'5"	42.1	36.6	253	246												220	33	13.04%

Teams
Dolvett's Team
Jen's Team

Standings
Week's Biggest Loser (Team or Individuals)
Week's Biggest Loser and Immunity
Immunity (Challenge or Weigh-in)
Results from At-Home
Contestant Withdraws before Weigh-In

BMI
Underweight (less than 18.5 BMI)
Normal (18.5 – 24.9 BMI)
Overweight (25 – 29.9 BMI)
Obese Class I (30 – 34.9 BMI)
Obese Class II (35 – 39.9 BMI)
Obese Class III (greater than 40 BMI)

Winners
$250,000 Winner (among the finalists)
$100,000 Winner (among the eliminated contestants)

=== Weigh-in difference history ===
Contestant	Week											Semi- final	Finale
Contestant	1	2	3	4	5	6	7	8	9	10	11	Semi- final	Finale
Roberto	−24	−9	−7	−8	−9	−8	−7	−11	−6	−9	−10	−6	−46
Stephen	−11	−9	−6	−6	−8	−10	−6	−8	−7	−10	−9	−10	−33
Colby	−18	−12	−9	−12	−6	−4	−7	−6	−7	−9	−11	−9	−12
Jacky	−14	−3	−9	−9	−4	−7	−7	−7	−6	−9	−8	−6	-28
Felicia	−14	−4	−7	−4	−3	−7	−4	−4	−2	−2	−4	−3	+2
Erin	−10	−6	−6	−6	−5	−5	−1	−3	−8	−6	−3	-28	
Lauren	−11	−8	−4	−5	−4	−3	−5	−7	−3	−5	-12		
Luis	−23	−7	−5	−6	−7	−10	−6	−11	−1	-63			
Rob	−20	−7	−10	−3	−8	−10	−6	−3	-49				
Vicki	−11	−6	−6	−4	−5	−3	−4	-22					
Toy	−8	−6	−7	−7	−6	−4	-46						
Sarah	−17	−6	−7	−8	−3	-78							
Richard	−13	−7	−9	−5	-11								
Hope	−10	−2	−2	-26									
Whitney	−10	0	-46										
Britney	−7	-26											

- Erin's 6 lb. weight loss in week 10 was displayed as 7 lbs. due to the one lb. advantage from the challenge.
- Erin's 3 lb. weight loss in week 11 was displayed as 4 lbs. due to the one lb. advantage from the challenge.
- Roberto's 10 lb. weight loss in week 11 was displayed as 9 lbs. due to the one lb. disadvantage from the challenge.
- Roberto's 6 lb. weight loss in week 12 was displayed as 8 lbs. due to the two lb. advantage from the challenge.

=== Weigh-in percentages history ===
Contestant	Week											Semi- final	Finale
Contestant	1	2	3	4	5	6	7	8	9	10	11	Semi- final	Finale
Roberto	−6.90%	−2.78%	−2.22%	−2.60%	−3.00%	−2.75%	−2.47%	−3.99%	−2.26%	−3.47%	−4.00%	−2.50%	−19.66%
Stephen	−3.56%	−3.02%	−2.08%	−2.12%	−2.89%	−3.72%	−2.32%	−3.16%	−2.86%	−4.20%	−3.95%	−4.57%	−15.79%
Colby	−5.31%	−3.74%	−2.91%	−4.00%	−2.08%	−1.42%	−2.52%	−2.21%	−2.64%	−3.49%	−4.47%	−3.78%	−5.24%
Jacky	−4.61%	−1.03%	−3.14%	−3.24%	−1.49%	−2.64%	−2.71%	−2.79%	−2.46%	−3.78%	−3.49%	−2.71%	-13.02%
Felicia	−5.98%	−1.82%	−3.24%	−1.91%	−1.46%	−3.47%	−2.05%	−2.09%	−1.07%	−1.08%	−2.19%	−1.68%	+1.14%
Erin	−4.20%	−2.63%	−2.70%	−2.78%	−2.38%	−2.44%	−0.50%	−1.51%	−4.08%	−3.19%	−1.65%	-15.64%	
Lauren	−4.70%	−3.54%	−1.86%	−2.37%	−1.94%	−1.49%	−2.51%	−3.61%	−1.60%	−2.72%	-6.70%		
Luis	−7.47%	−2.46%	−1.80%	−2.20%	−2.62%	−3.85%	−2.40%	−4.51%	−0.43%	-27.15%			
Rob	−6.13%	−2.29%	−3.34%	−1.04%	−2.80%	−3.60%	−2.24%	−1.15%	-18.92%				
Vicki	−4.64%	−2.65%	−2.73%	−1.87%	−2.38%	−1.46%	−1.98%	-11.11%					
Toy	−2.53%	−1.96%	−2.32%	−2.37%	−2.08%	−1.42%	-16.54%						
Sarah	−6.37%	−2.40%	−2.87%	−3.38%	−1.31%	-34.51%							
Richard	−4.14%	−2.33%	−3.06%	−1.75%	-3.93%								
Hope	−4.31%	−0.90%	−0.91%	-11.92%									
Whitney	−3.95%	0.00%	-18.93%										
Britney	−2.77%	-10.57%											

- Erin's 3.19% in week 10 was displayed as 3.72% due to the one lb. advantage from the challenge.
- Erin's 1.65% in week 11 was displayed as 2.20% due to the one lb. advantage from the challenge.
- Roberto's 4.00% in week 11 was displayed as 3.60% due to the one lb. disadvantage from the challenge.
- Roberto's 2.50% in week 12 was displayed as 3.33% due to the two lb. advantage from the challenge.

== Elimination history ==
Contestant	Week												
Contestant	1	2	3	4	5	6	7	8	9	10	11	12	Finale
Eliminated	Britney	Whitney	Hope	Richard	Sarah	Toy	Vicki	Rob	Luis	Lauren	Erin	Felicia	None
Eliminated	Britney	Whitney	Hope	Richard	Sarah	Toy	Vicki	Rob	Luis	Lauren	Erin	Jacky	None
Roberto	X	X	Hope	X	X	X	X	X	Lauren	Felicia	Erin	X	The Biggest Loser
Stephen	Britney	Whitney	X	X	X	X	X	X	Luis	Lauren	Erin	X	Runner-Up
Colby	X	X	Luis	X	X	Toy	Vicki	X	Lauren	Felicia	Erin	X	Third Placer
Jacky	Toy	X	X	X	X	X	X	X	?	Lauren	Felicia	X	Eliminated Week 12
Felicia	Britney	Jacky	X	X	X	X	X	X	Luis	X	X	X	Eliminated Week 12
Erin	Britney	Whitney	X	X	X	Vicki	X	X	Luis	Lauren	X	Eliminated Week 11	
Lauren	X	X	Hope	X	X	Toy	Erin	X	X	X	Eliminated Week 10		
Luis	X	X	X	X	X	Vicki	Vicki	X	X	Eliminated Week 9			
Rob	X	X	Hope	X	X	X	X	X	Eliminated Week 8				
Vicki	X	X	?	X	X	X	X	Eliminated Week 7					
Toy	X	?	X	X	X	X	Eliminated Week 6						
Sarah	X	X	?	X	X	Eliminated Week 5							
Richard	Britney	Whitney	X	X	Eliminated Week 4								
Hope	X	X	X	Eliminated Week 3									
Whitney	?	X	Eliminated Week 2										
Britney	X	Eliminated Week 1											

Immunity
X Below yellow line, unable to vote
X Below red line, automatically eliminated
X On the losing team, escaped the red line
X Not in elimination, unable to vote
Eliminated or not in house
Valid vote cast
? Vote not revealed or unknown
$250,000 winner (among the finalists)

== Weekly summary ==
=== Week 1: "Money Hungry" ===
First aired January 4, 2016
An all-new The Biggest Loser is back, and Season 17 is all about temptation. Eight couples arrive on the ranch to face the biggest temptations and challenges ever.

Things get serious quickly when their new host, Bob Harper, starts off with their first temptation. Everyone gets on the treadmill and goes at their desired pace. Bob starts off with giving $5,000 to anyone who's willing to push their button. But, once they push the button, they also quit the game. No one budges and he goes up to $10,000, then $20,000. Again, no one budges but contestant Vicki nearly collapses and stops. Bob tells her that she'll be okay and she didn't quit because she never pushed the button; she eventually returns to the treadmill. He makes a final push and offers everyone $25,000 to anyone who wants to quit. Every team resists the cash and earns the right to enter the gym. But it's just the beginning.

When they enter the gym, they are introduced to the two trainers for the season: Jen Widerstrom and Dolvett Quince. Jessie Pavelka didn't return this season. The contestants thought that they could choose their own trainer, but they don't realize that the trainers have been watching them since they got to the ranch and they'll be the one who picks the teams. Dolvett picks the Blue Team, Gray Team, Purple Team, and White Team to support Team Dolvett aka Team Red. That leaves Jen with the Green Team, Orange Team, Pink Team, and Yellow Team to support Team Jen aka Team Black.

For the first official challenge of Season 17, each team picks has to put sacks of money onto a scale which will lower a ladder in downtown Los Angeles. Once the ladder comes down, the team will decide which couple to climb the ladder all the way to top. Team Dolvett picks the WhiteTeam, while Team Jen pick the Green Team. Both teams are neck and neck at first, but Richard and Erin from Team Dolvett beat Team Jen's Hernandez brothers to the top when one of the twins on the other team keeps falling off the ladder. Once they reach the top, they find themselves another money temptation: $40,000 for themselves and quit, or an eight-pound advantage for their team at the weigh-in. They resist the temptation and choose the weigh-in advantage and their team is ecstatic for them.

At the weigh-in, both teams have their respective ups and downs. Team Jen wins the first weigh-in with 5.85% lost and Team Dolvett loses for the first time since his debut on the show with only 4.28% even though they had an 8-pound advantage in the beginning. Both members of the Blue Team, Britney and Toy fall below the line, and the team decides to vote Britney off the ranch by a 4–1 vote.

=== Week 2: "Taste Test" ===
First aired January 11, 2016
This week's temptation is food. In the first challenge, the players must rely on their newfound nutritional knowledge to answer trivia questions about some of their favorite dishes. The team that answers correctly gets to choose an opposing team member to eat the unhealthy food. With a score of 4 to 1, Team Dolvett wins and gets to choose one player to sit out at the weigh-in.

The players meet Dr. Huizenga in an autopsy room for a big wake-up call.

Back at the ranch, since Team Dolvett won the challenge, they decide to make Colby sit out the first weigh-in. Despite the advantage, Team Dolvett loses with only 1.85% weight lost compared to Team Jen's 2.09%. Jacky and Whitney fall below the line, and Team Dolvett votes Whitney off the ranch.

=== Week 3: "Keep on Truckin'" ===
First aired January 11, 2016
Team Dolvett feels frustrated they're not getting together. They meet for a heart-to-heart to work out their differences.

In the next challenge, the players must pull three food trucks over 600 feet. Team Jen finally conquers their first challenge, winning a healthy cooking lesson with celebrity chef Lorena Garcia. Team Dolvett's losing penalty is lunch from a food truck, which Richard indulges in.

Brand new to The Biggest Loser, the players compete in a Last-Chance Challenge – a team-rowing relay. Team Jen is the first to row 2,000 meters, winning a two-pound advantage at the weigh-in.

On the scales, Team Dolvett wins their first weigh-in with 2.73% weight lost, and Team Jen loses 2.48% – more than last time, but not enough to clinch the win. Luis and Hope fall below the line, and Team Jen votes Colby's wife, Hope, off the ranch, breaking Colby's heart.

=== Week 4: "Hooked on 'Tronics" ===
First aired January 18, 2016
In the first challenge, the teams must relay a correct combination of 14 colors to each other in a digital distraction-filled game of telephone. Team Dolvett wins and chooses one week of exclusive gym use over unrestricted access to the Internet and telephone, which means they won't be able to talk to their families. And without the use of the gym, Team Jen must find creative ways to burn calories outside.

After weeks of not being able to talk to their families, Team Jen gets to video chat with home.

At the first weigh-in, Bob reveals a Biggest Loser first – the red line. The player with the lowest percentage on the losing team will be sent home immediately. On the scales, Team Jen wins with 2.51% weight lost despite not having access to the gym. Richard from Team Dolvett falls below the red line and is eliminated.

=== Week 5: "The Big Switch" ===
First aired January 18, 2016
Bob drops a surprising bomb on the players, telling them they'll be changing teams. The new Team Jen is now Colby, Erin, Luis, Toy, Lauren and Vicki. The new Team Dolvett is Jacky, Roberto, Stephen, Rob, Felicia and Sarah. Will they stay focused on their new teams?

In the next challenge, the teams must climb platforms to retrieve 15-pound puzzle pieces and place them correctly on the board. The new Team Jen wins the challenge and a three-pound advantage at the weigh-in.

The teams go head-to-head in the Last-Chance Challenge – a relay race on the treadmill, bike and Jacob's Ladder. Team Dolvett wins a one-pound advantage at the weigh-in.

On the scales, Team Dolvett loses 2.23%, while Team Jen loses 2.38%, and everyone is heartbroken when Sarah falls below the red line and is immediately eliminated. Her dad, Rob, pleads to let him be eliminated instead of her.

=== Week 6: "Ready? Set. Auction!" ===
First aired January 25, 2016
This week is all about luxurious temptations, and Bob has some great ones up his sleeve. The players are given 500 Biggest Loser bucks to spend on bidding in a luxury item auction, and Colby blows all $500 on a mystery box. Everyone is stunned when the mystery box reveals an immunity prize, saving Colby from elimination this week. Toy buys a growing one-pound advantage. She can either use it this week as a one-pound advantage, or save it for next week for two pounds, and so on up to five pounds. Jen tells Toy not to use it this week, thinking it will be a greater advantage later.

In a one-on-one session with Bob, Jacky reveals that she turned to food for support after her dad died in her 20s, and feels like her kids don't know the real Jacky.

In the Last-Chance Challenge, three players from each team flip a 320-pound tire 50 feet, then do 50 step-ups. Team Jen wins, gaining a one-pound advantage at the weigh-in.

On the scales, Team Jen loses 2.09%, trailing Team Dolvett's 3.22%. Toy and Vicki fall below the yellow line, and the team votes Toy off.

=== Week 7: "Ship Shape" ===
First aired January 25, 2016
In the next challenge, the teams pull a boat to shore and row to the finish line. Team Dolvett wins and is thrilled with the prize – a relaxing day on a private yacht, reading letters from home.

After the workout, Bob checks in with the players, asking them to be mindful of why they're at the ranch. Felicia reveals a heart-wrenching history of abuse from her stepfather.

At the second weigh-in, Erin moves into the 100s. Team Jen loses with 2.04%, trailing Team Dolvett's 2.38% weight lost. Erin and Vicki fall below the yellow line, and Vicki is voted off.

=== Week 8: "Homeward Bound" ===
First aired February 1, 2016
The temptations of home lure the players this week. One player from each team returns home, and their weight loss will be the only number that counts toward a win on the scales.

In the first challenge, each team holds a net while opposing players sink 10-pound balls into it. Team Dolvett is the first team to drop the net, giving Team Jen the choice of whom to send home from each team. They choose the brothers, Roberto and Luis.

While home, the brothers visit with family and get a surprise visit from Bob, who puts them through the wringer.

On the scales, Luis wins the weigh-in between the brothers, protecting Team Jen. Rob, having lost the lowest percentage of weight for Team Dolvett, is eliminated.

=== Week 9: "Real World Problems" ===
First aired February 1, 2016
Bob announces the players are now on their own, splitting from their teams and wearing individual jerseys.

The players are faced with a huge temptation – freedom. With a car and a list of activities to choose from, it's up to the players to decide how their time is spent. Everyone shows up for their first individual workout with Jen except two players, Colby and Jacky, who go wine tasting.

In their first challenge as individuals, the players race through an obstacle course. Felicia wins by a foot and gains immunity. Luis, however was so mad that he should've won immunity, which led to a heated argument between the twin brothers and Felicia with Roberto saying, "You gave the weakest person immunity."

The players get a girls' and boys' night out and cut loose a little, except Felicia, who cuts loose a lot. After rounds of shots, the girls go get piercings. The next morning, the boys and Erin show up for a workout with Dolvett, while the rest of the ladies go parasailing.

In their first weigh-in as individuals, the players face a yellow line. Lauren and Luis fall below the line, and the players vote Luis off the ranch.

=== Week 10: "Makeover Week" ===
First aired February 8, 2016

The highly anticipated makeover week begins, and the seven remaining contestants are eager to experience their transformations and reveal their new looks to their loved ones, who've been flown in from all around the country.

First, longstanding "Project Runway" mentor and "The Biggest Loser" makeover mainstay Tim Gunn gives each player a wardrobe renovation, carefully choosing outfits that highlight each contestant's incredible progress. Next, Hollywood mane master Ken Paves completes the makeovers with showstopping new hairstyles, including an update to Colby's beard.

The contestants debut their new looks for their families, which leads to many hugs and tears of joy over their stunning accomplishments. Then Bob reveals that the family members will be sticking around for a little while longer – they'll be competing alongside the contestants in the next challenge!

Each contestant picks a family member to help them in a relay, in which they run back and forth to load weights on a sled and eventually pull it through the finish line. With the help of her boyfriend, Erin wins the challenge and earns a one-pound advantage for the weigh-in.

For most of the contestants, the weigh-in shows tremendous achievement over the week. However, Lauren and Felicia fall below the yellow line, and the players vote Lauren off the ranch.

=== Week 11: "I Got the Power" ===
First aired February 15, 2016
Week 11 starts off with a huge challenge. The six remaining players are suspended above water and must pull themselves up as the rope slowly lowers. The last player to stay dry and climbing is Erin, winning a one-pound advantage at the weigh-in and the ability to dish out a one-pound disadvantage to a competitor.

Bob talks one-on-one with the players, preparing them for life after the ranch. Will they be able to sustain their healthy habits?

At the weigh-in, Erin gives the one-pound disadvantage to Roberto, but he stays above the yellow line with a 10-pound loss. And despite the one-pound advantage, Erin falls below the yellow line along with Felicia. The players vote Erin off the ranch.

=== Week 12: "The Final Cut" ===
First aired February 15, 2016
Heading into the final week before the live finale, the players face the biggest challenge of the season. They race up a hill carrying the sum total weight they've lost at the ranch. Along the way, they stop at 11 checkpoints, representing 11 weigh-ins, to discard the amount of weight they lost at each week's weigh-in. Roberto reaches the finish line first, winning a two-pound advantage at the weigh-in.

The players head to the gym with Jen and Dolvett, not for a workout, but to view their journey videos and see how far they've come. They reflect on who they were when they started, and the path that lies ahead.

Dr. Huizenga gives the players an update on their health, showing them the astonishing accomplishments they've made in the last 12 weeks.

At the Last-Chance Workout, the players kick it into high gear, pushing themselves to shed a few more pounds for the last weigh-in before the finale.

In the last weigh-in before the live finale, Felicia fell below the red line and was automatically eliminated; Roberto and Stephen stayed above the red line, securing their place as finalists. Who will the third finalist be?

=== Week 13: "Live Finale" ===
First aired February 22, 2016
Colby steps up to the scale and clinches his spot in the finale, meaning that this is the second season to have an all-male finale.

All the eliminated contestants have been working hard to win the at-home $100,000 prize. But there can only be one winner – Luis Hernandez, with a total weight loss of 139 pounds.

Before the finalists find out who will be declared the Biggest Loser and take home the $250,000 prize, they face one final temptation – $50,000. But it comes with a three-pound penalty. Despite the huge setback, Colby takes his chances and claims cash and the disadvantage.

With a total weight loss of 160 pounds, Roberto is Season 17's Biggest Loser, taking home $250,000. With Roberto and Luis both winning, this is the second time twins have won both prizes, the first time being in season 4.

=== After the Show ===
On July 29, 2020, Stephen Kmet died at the age of 47.

== Reception ==
=== U.S. Nielsen ratings ===
Episode	Title	Air date	Timeslot (EST)	Rating/share (18–49)	Viewers (million)	Rank (timeslot)	Rank (night)
1	"Money Hungry"	January 4, 2016	Monday; 9:00 PM	1.2/4	3.86	2	7
2	"Taste Test / Keep on Truckin'"	January 11, 2016	Monday; 9:00 PM	1.1/3	3.50	2	6
3	"Hooked on 'Tronics / The Big Switch"	January 18, 2016	Monday; 9:00 PM	1.0/3	3.45	2	8
4	"Ready? Set. Auction! / Ship Shape"	January 25, 2016	Monday; 9:00 PM	1.2/4	3.64	3	7
5	"Homeward Bound / Real World Problems"	February 1, 2016	Monday; 9:00 PM	1.0/3	3.21	3	9
6	"Makeover Week"	February 8, 2016	Monday; 9:00 PM	1.1/4	3.79	3	9
7	"I Got the Power / The Final Cut"	February 15, 2016	Monday; 9:00 PM	0.8/3	2.80	2	7
8	"Live Finale"	February 22, 2016	Monday; 9:00 PM	1.2/4	3.91	3	7

== See also ==
- The Biggest Loser (American TV series)
- The Biggest Loser
