= Spartan: Ultimate Team Challenge =

American sports entertainment competition series

- Directed by: Kent Weed
- Presented by: Dhani Jones; Kyle Martino; MJ Acosta; Evan Dollard; Apolo Ohno; Kelvin Washington; Nick Swisher
- Opening theme: "Someone's Watching Me" by Qleo ft. Lazee
- Country of origin: United States
- Original language: English
- No. of seasons: 2
- No. of episodes: 14

Production
- Executive producers: Arthur Smith; Kent Weed; Anthony Storm; Joe DeSena; Jeffrey Connor; Kenneth C. Koleyni
- Camera setup: Multiple-camera
- Production company: A. Smith & Co.

Original release
- Network: NBC
- Release: June 13, 2016 – July 23, 2017

Spartan: Ultimate Team Challenge is an American sports entertainment competition series based on the obstacle race of a similar name. Greenlighted to order on August 26, 2015, the series premiered on June 13, 2016 on NBC.

On March 17, 2017, NBC renewed the series for a second season which premiered on June 12, 2017. The second season concluded with "Strike a Pose" winning the grand prize of $250,000.

== Premise ==
The series brings people together in teams of five– two men, two women, and an "elite Spartan athlete" who is picked by the show and serve as team captain. The elite athlete can either be from the Spartan Pro Team or from a different field of expertise.

== Production ==
The deadline for applications for season one was September 27, 2015. Competitors will have to face their physical and mental limits while racing through a one-mile obstacle course over fire, water, and mud for the opportunity to win $250,000. A total of fourteen episodes have been ordered by NBC.

== Spartan Obstacles ==
The Spartan Obstacles include:

The Tire Swing: Teams must swing across a pool of water on a giant tire propelling and catching their teammates.

The Barrel Roll: The Spartans must spin a large steel barrel together over a distance before locking it into place.

The Slip Wall: A large slippery wall on a steep angle that teams must create a human ladder to climb.

The Dunk Wall: An elevated pool that features various walls that Spartans must either swim under or climb over.

The Zip Log: A zip obstacle that all team members must jump and hold and ride until they reach the end of the track.

The Timber Drop: A large beam must be lifted and flung on a truss platform. Once in place the team must climb the beam together.

The Human Ladder: Teams must climb a spinning ladder strung above a pool. The team members must climb over each other to reach the top without falling in the water.

Totem Climb: The Spartan team must climb a rope suspended above a pool, they may only move onto the next obstacles once all of the team have climbed onto the rope.

Table Tilt: A large rectangular structure on a spinning pivot suspended above a pool. Teams must use their collective balance to one by one climb over the table to the other side of the pool.

Car Crank: Spartan teams must spin and crank that elevates a car into the air.

== Ratings ==
=== Season 1 ===
No. in series	Episode	Air date	Timeslot	Rating/Share (18–49)		Viewers (millions)	Nightly rank	Weekly rank
1	"Premiere"	June 13, 2016	Monday 10:00 p.m.	1.5	5	4.84	4	10
2	"Bet The Farm"	June 20, 2016	Monday 10:00 p.m.	1.4	5	4.54	3	TBA
3	"No One Triumphs Alone"	June 23, 2016	Thursday 9:00 p.m.	0.8	3	2.75	7	TBA
4	"Spartan vs. Ninja"	June 30, 2016	Thursday 9:00 p.m.	1.0	4	3.71	6	TBA
5	"The Comeback"	July 7, 2016	Thursday 9:00 p.m.	0.9	3	3.17	6	TBA
6	"Spartan vs. Ninja: The Sequel"	July 14, 2016	Thursday 9:00 p.m.	1.0	4	3.14	5	TBA
7/8	"Spartan Season One Championship"	July 21, 2016	Thursday 9:00 p.m.	0.9	4	3.23	5	TBA

=== Season 2 ===
No. in series	Episode	Air date	Timeslot	Rating/Share (18–49)		Viewers (millions)	Nightly rank
1	"Premiere"	June 12, 2017	Monday 10:00 p.m.	0.9	4	3.45	5
2	"Qualifiers - Night 2"	June 19, 2017	Monday 10:00 p.m.	1.2	5	4.47	3
3	"Qualifiers - Night 3"	June 26, 2017	Monday 10:00 p.m.	1.0	4	3.67	3
4	"Qualifiers - Night 4"	July 3, 2017	Monday 10:00 p.m.	0.8	4	3.45	2
5	"Round Two - Night 1"	July 10, 2017	Monday 10:00 p.m.	1.0	4	3.90	3
6	"Round Two - Night 2"	July 17, 2017	Monday 10:00 p.m.	1.0	4	3.75	3
7/8	"Season Finale"	July 23, 2017	Sunday 9:00 p.m.	0.5	2	2.19	9

== Adaptations ==
A Danish version of the series was broadcast on Kanal 5 in 2017.

An Australian version titled Australian Spartan debuted on the Seven Network in 2018.

A Brazilian version, titled Spartan Brasil is part of Domingão com Huck, being a segment of the show and is debuted on TV Globo in 2027.
