= The Great Christmas Light Fight =

- Genre: Competition; Reality television
- Judges: Michael Moloney; Sabrina Soto; Carter Oosterhouse; Taniya Nayak
- Narrated by: Brian Fairlee
- Country of origin: United States
- Original language: English
- No. of seasons: 13
- No. of episodes: 82

Production
- Executive producers: Brady Connell; Max Swedlow; Thom Beers (2013–2014); Jennifer Mullin
- Production location: Various Locations
- Running time: 42–44 minutes
- Production companies: Base Camp Films; Fremantle North America

Original release
- Network: ABC
- Release: December 9, 2013 – present

The Great Christmas Light Fight (originally titled Lights, Camera, Christmas! in development) is an American reality television competition show that premiered on December 9, 2013, on ABC. The seasonal miniseries is traditionally scheduled in a double-run of two hour-long episodes, all airing Mondays in the first three weeks of December annually as part of ABC's seasonal programming lineup (branded from 2017 to 2018 as 25 Days of Christmas).

On November 2, 2023, the series was renewed for a twelfth season, which premiered on December 5, 2024, with a thirteenth season already confirmed.

== Synopsis ==
Each episode of The Great Christmas Light Fight features a series of families or groups that create elaborate Christmas light displays. The contestants are chosen in advance by producers. The displays are judged on three categories: use of lights, overall design, and Christmas spirit. Each display is first individually featured, then the judge or judges review the display and its specific details. Once all contestants have been reviewed, a winner is chosen, and the judges return to the winner to congratulate them. The winner of each week's episode wins $50,000 and a holiday-themed trophy.

The series had its first Halloween-themed special episode entitled The Great Halloween Fright Fight which aired on October 28, 2014. The judging criteria for these specials is similar to the regular Christmas episodes, with three factors: overall design, Halloween spirit, and creativity. On October 2, 2023, two more of these special episodes were announced for the 2023 season.

== Series overview ==
Season	Episodes	Originally released	
Season	Episodes	First released	Last released
1	5	December 9, 2013	December 23, 2013
Special		October 28, 2014	
2	6	December 8, 2014	December 22, 2014
3	6	December 7, 2015	December 21, 2015
4	6	December 5, 2016	December 19, 2016
5	6	December 4, 2017	December 18, 2017
6	7	November 26, 2018	December 17, 2018
7	6	December 2, 2019	December 16, 2019
8	6	December 9, 2020	December 23, 2020
9	6	November 28, 2021	December 2, 2021
10	6	November 28, 2022	December 12, 2022
Specials	2	October 22, 2023	October 29, 2023
11	7	November 26, 2023	December 19, 2023
12	6	December 5, 2024	December 19, 2024
13	6	December 4, 2025	December 18, 2025

=== Season 1 (2013) ===
No. overall	No. in season	Title	Original release date	Prod. code	U.S. viewers (millions)
1	1	"Episode One"	December 9, 2013	101	5.50
2	2	"Episode Two"	December 16, 2013	102	4.04
3	3	"Episode Three"	December 16, 2013	103	4.04
4	4	"Episode Four"	December 23, 2013	104	4.95
5	5	"Episode Five"	December 23, 2013	105	4.95

=== Special (2014) ===
No. overall	Title	Original release date	U.S. viewers (millions)
6	"SPECIAL: The Great Halloween Fright Fight"	October 28, 2014	3.75

=== Season 2 (2014) ===
No. overall	No. in season	Title	Original release date	Prod. code	U.S. viewers (millions)
7	1	"Episode 1"	December 8, 2014	201	6.83
8	2	"Episode 2"	December 8, 2014	202	6.83
9	3	"Episode 3"	December 15, 2014	203	5.30
10	4	"Episode 4"	December 15, 2014	204	5.30
11	5	"Episode 5"	December 22, 2014	206	5.88
12	6	"Episode 6: The Season Finale"	December 22, 2014	205	5.88

=== Season 3 (2015) ===
No. overall	No. in season	Title	Original release date	Prod. code	U.S. viewers (millions)
13	1	"Season Premiere: Episode 1"	December 7, 2015	301	5.14
14	2	"Episode 2"	December 7, 2015	302	5.14
15	3	"Episode 3: Neighborhood Edition"	December 14, 2015	304	4.39
16	4	"Episode 4"	December 14, 2015	303	4.39
17	5	"Episode 5"	December 21, 2015	305	5.64
18	6	"Episode 6: The Season Finale"	December 21, 2015	306	5.64

=== Season 4 (2016) ===
No. overall	No. in season	Title	Original release date	Prod. code	U.S. viewers (millions)
19	1	"Season Premiere: Episode 1"	December 5, 2016	401	5.43
20	2	"Episode 2"	December 5, 2016	402	5.43
21	3	"Episode 3"	December 12, 2016	403	4.64
22	4	"Episode 4"	December 12, 2016	404	4.64
23	5	"Episode 5"	December 19, 2016	406	4.51
24	6	"Episode 6"	December 19, 2016	405	4.51

=== Season 5 (2017) ===
No. overall	No. in season	Title	Original release date	Prod. code	U.S. viewers (millions)
25	1	"Season 5 Premiere: Episode 1"	December 4, 2017	502	5.20
26	2	"Episode 2"	December 4, 2017	503	5.20
27	3	"Episode 3"	December 11, 2017	504	4.31
28	4	"Episode 4"	December 11, 2017	505	4.31
29	5	"Episode 5"	December 18, 2017	501	4.23
30	6	"Episode 6: Season Finale"	December 18, 2017	506	4.23

=== Season 6 (2018) ===
No. overall	No. in season	Title	Original release date	Prod. code	U.S. viewers (millions)
31	1	"Season 6 Premiere: Episode 1"	November 26, 2018	602	4.66
32	2	"Episode 2"	November 26, 2018	601	4.66
33	3	"Episode 3"	December 3, 2018	603	5.01
34	4	"Episode 4"	December 3, 2018	604	5.01
35	5	"Episode 5: All Stars"	December 10, 2018	607	3.34
36	6	"Episode 6"	December 17, 2018	605	3.85
37	7	"Episode 7: Season Finale"	December 17, 2018	606	3.85

=== Season 7 (2019) ===
No. overall	No. in season	Title	Original release date	Prod. code	U.S. viewers (millions)
38	1	"Season 7 Premiere: Episode 1"	December 2, 2019	701	3.79
39	2	"Episode 2"	December 2, 2019	704	3.79
40	3	"Episode 3"	December 9, 2019	703	3.82
41	4	"Episode 4"	December 9, 2019	706	3.82
42	5	"Episode 5"	December 16, 2019	702	3.27
43	6	"Episode 6: Season Finale"	December 16, 2019	705	3.27

=== Season 8 (2020) ===
No. overall	No. in season	Title	Original release date	Prod. code	U.S. viewers (millions)
44	1	"Season 8 Premiere: Episode 1"	December 9, 2020	802	4.02
45	2	"Episode 2"	December 9, 2020	805	4.02
46	3	"Episode 3"	December 16, 2020	803	3.69
47	4	"Episode 4"	December 16, 2020	804	3.69
48	5	"Episode 5"	December 23, 2020	806	2.73
49	6	"Episode 6: Season Finale"	December 23, 2020	801	2.70

=== Season 9 (2021) ===
No. overall	No. in season	Title	Original release date	Prod. code	U.S. viewers (millions)
50	1	"Season 9 Premiere: Episode 1"	November 28, 2021	901	2.39
51	2	"Episode 2"	November 28, 2021	902	2.39
52	3	"Episode 3"	November 29, 2021	906	2.23
53	4	"Episode 4"	November 29, 2021	903	2.23
54	5	"Episode 5"	December 2, 2021	904	1.82
55	6	"Episode 6: Season Finale"	December 2, 2021	905	1.82

=== Season 10 (2022) ===
No. overall	No. in season	Title	Original release date	Prod. code	U.S. viewers (millions)
56	1	"Season 10 Premiere: Episode 1"	November 28, 2022	1001	2.81
57	2	"Episode 2"	November 28, 2022	1004	2.81
58	3	"Episode 3"	December 5, 2022	1003	2.60
59	4	"Episode 4"	December 5, 2022	1002	2.60
60	5	"Episode 5"	December 12, 2022	1006	2.54
61	6	"Episode 6: Season Finale"	December 12, 2022	1005	2.54

=== Specials (2023) ===
No. overall	Title	Original release date	Prod. code	U.S. viewers (millions)
62	"The Great Halloween Fright Fight: Episode 1"	October 22, 2023	201	1.11
63	"The Great Halloween Fright Fight: Episode 2"	October 29, 2023	202	1.73

=== Season 11 (2023) ===
No. overall	No. in season	Title	Original release date	Prod. code	U.S. viewers (millions)
64	1	"Season 11 Premiere: Episode 1: All-Stars 2"	November 26, 2023	1107	1.76
65	2	"Episode 2"	December 3, 2023	1105	1.90
66	3	"Episode 3"	December 10, 2023	1102	1.39
67	4	"Episode 4: Heavyweights"	December 12, 2023	1106	2.05
68	5	"Episode 5"	December 12, 2023	1103	2.05
69	6	"Episode 6"	December 19, 2023	1104	1.78
70	7	"Episode 7: Season Finale"	December 19, 2023	1101	1.78

=== Season 12 (2024) ===
No. overall	No. in season	Title	Original release date	Prod. code	U.S. viewers (millions)
71	1	"Season 12 Premiere: Episode 1"	December 5, 2024	1203	2.35
72	2	"Episode 2"	December 5, 2024	1202	2.35
73	3	"Episode 3"	December 12, 2024	1204	2.34
74	4	"Episode 4"	December 12, 2024	1201	2.34
75	5	"Episode 5"	December 19, 2024	1205	2.12
76	6	"Episode 6: Season Finale"	December 19, 2024	1206	2.12

=== Season 13 (2025) ===
No. overall	No. in season	Title	Original release date	Prod. code	U.S. viewers (millions)
77	1	"The Holiday Express"	December 4, 2025	1305	2.32
78	2	"Santa's Making His List"	December 4, 2025	1306	1.92
79	3	"Christmas Vacation"	December 11, 2025	1302	N/A
80	4	"Holiday Igloomination"	December 11, 2025	1301	N/A
81	5	"You Decked My Battleship"	December 18, 2025	1303	N/A
82	6	"It's Gonna Be Elftastic"	December 18, 2025	1304	N/A
