= Angel from Hell =

- Genre: Sitcom; Fantasy
- Created by: Tad Quill
- Starring: Jane Lynch; Maggie Lawson; Kyle Bornheimer; Kevin Pollak
- Composers: Gabriel Mann; Rebecca Kneubuhl
- Country of origin: United States
- Original language: English
- No. of seasons: 1
- No. of episodes: 13

Production
- Executive producers: Tad Quill; Don Scardino
- Camera setup: Single-camera
- Running time: 22 minutes
- Production companies: Quill Entertainment; CBS Television Studios

Original release
- Network: CBS
- Release: January 7 – July 23, 2016

Angel from Hell is an American single-camera fantasy sitcom created by Tad Quill. The series was greenlit to order on May 8, 2015, by CBS, and premiered on January 7, 2016. On February 8, 2016, CBS cancelled the series and pulled it from the schedule after the first five episodes had aired, leaving eight produced episodes unaired. The remaining episodes began airing on July 2, 2016.

== Premise ==
The series is about an angel named Amy, who acts as a guardian for Allison, forming an unlikely friendship.

== Cast and characters ==
=== Main ===
- Jane Lynch as Amy Cass, a mysterious and odd individual who reveals herself to be an angel. She has a crazy persona and can make unbelievable predictions that come true. It is suggested that Amy has been watching Allison since childhood.
- Maggie Lawson as Allison Fuller, a dermatologist who likes to multi-task and is a perfectionist. She thinks that Amy is nuts, until she discovers that Amy knows everything about her and starts believing her crazy predictions.
- Kyle Bornheimer as Brad Fuller, Allison's younger brother, who lives above her garage
- Kevin Pollak as Marvin "Marv" Fuller, Allison's dermatologist father and boss

=== Recurring ===
- Ginger Gonzaga as Kelly, Allison's former best friend who comes back into her life
- Constance Marie as Linda, Marv's new love interest
- David Denman as Evan, Allison's boyfriend whom she discovers has been cheating on her
- Diora Baird as Brandi, a flight attendant

== Episodes ==
No.	Title	Directed by	Written by	Original release date	Prod. code	US viewers (millions)
1	"Pilot"	Don Scardino	Tad Quill	January 7, 2016	AFH101	8.13
Allison, a dermatologist who works in her father's practice, meets Amy, a quirky and blunt woman who claims to be her guardian angel. Having watched out for her since childhood, she now decides to openly help Allison by giving her life lessons. At first, Allison does not believe her, but Amy gains her trust by knowledge of her secrets and predictions that turn out to be true, most importantly that her boyfriend Evan is cheating on her with her best friend, Jill.
2	"Face Your Fears"	Clark Mathis	Jim Brandon & Brian Singleton	January 14, 2016	AFH112	6.99
Allison is forced to confront her fears, starting with clowns and spiders until finally moving on to making amends with her ex-best friend, Kelly. Allison hires Joey McIntyre to surprise Kelly at her gallery opening, but inadvertently interrupts her marriage proposal. Amy suggests giving Kelly a straightforward apology, which Allison does. Kelly then asks Allison to be her bridesmaid and Allison asks Amy to have lunch with her and her brother. Meanwhile, Brad and Marv set out to deliver some revenge on Evan for cheating on Allison.
3	"Go With Your Gut"	Don Scardino	Chris Harris	January 21, 2016	AFH102	7.03
When Allison decides to open an online dating account, Amy decides to help her now that Allison has decided to re-enter the dating scene. But the person Allison meets online, a handsome attorney, may not be what the love doctor ordered when Amy takes Allison to a club and encounters him there, along with his wife after she shows up and sees him kissing Allison. Meanwhile, Brad tells Allison that he moving out of the apartment, while Marv learns more about Amy, and discovers that she has an unexplained past, a no-jail-time criminal record with holes in it, and lived in a halfway home. Allison decides to let Amy lease out Brad's place.
4	"Family Business"	Craig Zisk	Austen Earl	January 28, 2016	AFH103	6.76
Allison, who along with unsolicited and unwanted advice from Amy, finds herself dealing with trying to run the office while Marv volunteers to join Brad on a trip that he booked for him and his ex-wife a year in advance. Unfortunately for Allison (and unpredictable advice from Amy), the situation of being in charge is made worse, as is the trip for Marv and Brad. In the end, Marv decides to make Allison a full-time partner, just in time for Amy to give Allison a long-awaited surprise gift that she ordered long before the fiasco... a mug that reads "Fuller & Fuller Dermatology."
5	"Soulmates"	Don Scardino	Chadd Gindin	February 4, 2016	AFH105	6.34
After a friend who is about to be engaged presses Allison about not having found a soulmate yet, Amy gets involved in helping Allison find the perfect man. Unfortunately, when Allison does finally meet her soulmate, Amy (who had predicted that he'll be the one for Allison, but she's half a year away from doing so), has to break up the perfect match after they kiss. Meanwhile, Marv asks Linda (Constance Marie) out for a date, which makes Brad feel uncomfortable.
6	"Angel Probation"	Jay Karas	Jim Brandon & Brian Singleton	March 27, 2016 (AUS); July 2, 2016 (U.S.)	AFH106	1.75
Amy is placed on "Angel Probation" and is told to perform ten good deeds after she cheated on game night; Allison's ex-boyfriend Evan returns to make amends but when he brings his dog along it places Amy in the doghouse when she allows the dog to chase after a pack of turkey dogs and loses him. Meanwhile, Brad breaks his father's drone after he crashes it at his client's home.
7	"Angel Appreciation Day"	Reginald Hudlin	Amy Mass	April 17, 2016 (AUS); July 2, 2016 (U.S.)	AFH107	1.58
Allison is asked to present dermatology products on television, but her camera shyness is making her feel more nervous. After Allison kills a bee that was flying around an allergic Brad, Amy points out that the insect is Brad's guardian angel. Amy is forced into double duty until a replacement is found for Brad, who is convinced by Amy to quit his job. After a brief falling out, Amy comes to Allison's rescue and helps Allison realize that her dad is the reason behind her nervousness.
8	"Practice Guy"	Steven Tsuchida	Peter Tibbals & Eric Goldberg	April 3, 2016 (AUS); July 9, 2016 (U.S.)	AFH108	2.08
Amy helps Allison solve her dating problems by trying to have her flirt with a guy that Amy wants Allison to practice on, but ends up finding the guy attractive; Brad flirts with a receptionist while dealing with his boss' "de-promotion", who just became his new competition for the receptionist's affections; Marv has to deal with a fellow doctor and his nagging patient.
9	"Rain Check"	Linda Mendoza	Austen Earl	April 10, 2016 (AUS); July 9, 2016 (U.S.)	AFH110	1.92
Amy helps Allison push her relationship with Gavin along while helping fellow angel Lee restore his footing; Brad meets his new red-haired and annoying intern, only to suspect that she might secretly be his boss after he sees a photo of the owner that resembles her; Marv wants to take Linda on a hike through an illegal area near the Hollywood Sign for a romantic encounter.
10	"Funsgiving"	Tristram Shapeero	Eric Goldberg & Peter Tibbals	April 24, 2016 (AUS); July 16, 2016 (U.S.)	AFH104	1.76
With Thanksgiving around the corner, the first without Allison's and Brad's mother, Amy, channeling a suggestion from Allison's mother, decides to help the Fullers liven up the holiday with an alternative get-together called "Funsgiving" at a bar. Marv finds romance with a flight attendant that Brad wanted to hook up with, leading to a chaotic family distortion. Meanwhile, Amy hooks up with a guy (Ian Gomez) and takes food reserved for the needy. NOTE: Aired out of order as Marv is not dating Linda in this episode. He meets her in episode 9 and she breaks up with him in episode 11.
11	"The Flask"	Jay Chandrasekhar	Chadd Gindin	May 1, 2016 (AUS); July 16, 2016 (U.S.)	AFH109	1.72
Allison helps an unemployed Amy look for a real job. But when that fails, Amy sells her liquor flask, which pays off for $25,000 and she spends it on Allison, who is already under pressure to mail out wedding invitations for Kelly while preparing to attend an upcoming conference; Marv feels like he is being "ghosted" by Linda; Brad confronts his online gambling problem and deals with a fitness instructor who broke up with him.
12	"Believe Me, Part One"	Don Scardino	Annabel Oakes	May 8, 2016 (AUS); July 23, 2016 (U.S.)	AFH111	1.85
Allison's purse gets stolen and she's left stranded at the beach. Marv's prank war with his rival continues. Brad gets closer with his receptionist Clara after the two have fun at a mansion that Brad was trying to sell. After Allison is frustrated with Amy's outrageous claims, Amy proves she is an angel by saving Allison from a moving transit bus.
13	"Believe Me, Part Two"	Don Scardino	Amy Mass	May 15, 2016 (AUS); July 23, 2016 (U.S.)	AFH113	1.67
Allison finally believes Amy's claim that she is actually an angel. At the same time, Amy asks Allison for help breaking up her best friend Kelly's relationship with Hank before their wedding. Brad fills in as a groomsman at Hank's request. Marv is intimidated by his ex's ex-ex, Raphael, and reconnects with Brandi (Diora Baird), his one night stand. Amy finally reveals another secret: she has a husband!

== Reception ==
=== Critical response ===
Angel from Hell has received average reviews from critics. On Metacritic, it holds a score of 55/100, based on 18 reviews. On Rotten Tomatoes, the series score is 41%, based on 29 reviews, with an average rating of 5/10. The critics' consensus reads: "Banish thee from the airwaves, oh Angel from Hell, for sins of commonplace sitcom triteness and obnoxious use of an iconic comedic lead."

=== Controversy ===
After the series began airing, One Million Moms, a website of the American Family Association, claimed that the show "disrespects Christianity". The Christian group also suggested a list of sponsors to pull advertisements from the program.

== Reference to other media ==
The show's main graphic (shown at top) alludes to a figure in Raphael's Sistine Madonna.
