= 20/20: In an Instant =

2015 American television documentary series

- Also known as: In an Instant
- Genre: Documentary
- Country of origin: United States
- Original language: English
- No. of seasons: 3
- No. of episodes: 22

Production
- Executive producers: Maria Awes; Andy Awes
- Running time: 80-83 minutes
- Production companies: Committee Films; Lincoln Square Productions

Original release
- Network: ABC
- Release: March 6, 2015 – August 4, 2018

20/20: In an Instant (or In an Instant) is an American documentary series on ABC. The show premiered on March 6, 2015, before moving to its regular timeslot on Fridays at 9:00 pm. The show follows people who have gone through life changing events as they come to terms and relive the moments.

On May 24, 2016, the show was renewed for a second season, which premiered on June 18, 2016, and ran for six consecutive weeks. The season finale aired on July 23, 2016. On May 19, 2017, the show was renewed for a third season, which premiered on June 3, 2017.

== Series overview ==
Season	Episodes	Originally released	
Season	Episodes	First released	Last released
1	7	March 6, 2015	April 11, 2015
2	6	June 18, 2016	July 23, 2016
3	9	June 3, 2017	August 4, 2018

== Episodes ==
=== Season 1 (2015) ===
No. overall	No. in season	Title	Original release date	U.S. viewers (millions)
1	1	"Flying Blind"	March 6, 2015	4.39
A family survives a plane crash that killed two in the Alaskan wilderness.
2	2	"Rush Hour Disaster"	March 13, 2015	4.36
In 2007, an interstate bridge holding hundreds of people in Minneapolis gives way.
3	3	"Grizzly Bear Attack"	March 20, 2015	3.62
A man protects his daughter when a grizzly bear attacks the two during a celebratory hike in rural Montana.
4	4	"Left for Dead"	March 27, 2015	4.41
In a Milwaukee suburb, a woman is beaten unconscious and left in a garbage bin locked in a storage unit in Illinois by her abusive ex-husband.
5	5	"Bad Guys at the Good Guys"	April 3, 2015	3.38
A group of gunmen holds employees and shoppers hostage at an electronics store in Sacramento, California.
6	6	"Buried Alive"	April 10, 2015	4.05
A man is trapped when a shelf in a silo collapses, burying him beneath several feet of rotten corn in Eldora, Iowa.
7	7	"The Shootout"	April 17, 2015	2.89
In Jacksonville, Florida, police officer Pete Soulis had no way of knowing that the suspicious guy in the parking lot was likely a killer from Georgia on the run. When the ex-con took aim at him, Pete found himself in one of the most epic gun battles a cop has ever survived.

=== Season 2 (2016) ===
No. overall	No. in season	Title	Original release date	U.S. viewers (millions)
8	1	"Tragedy in Tornado Alley"	June 18, 2016	N/A
A catastrophic tornado hits the town of Moore, Oklahoma.
9	2	"Murder in the Maternity Ward"	June 25, 2016	N/A
A gunman holds a maternity ward hostage, seeking the doctor who performed a tubal ligation surgery on his wife two years earlier in Salt Lake City, Utah.
10	3	"Desert Dog Rescue"	July 2, 2016	3.16
When a woman falls 60 feet off a canyon wall while running with her dog and shatters her pelvis in Moab, Utah, she must fight to stay alive as temperatures drop.
11	4	"He Picked the Wrong Girl"	July 9, 2016	N/A
Ashley Ware bravely fights against an attacker after being abducted from her home in Fargo, North Dakota.
12	5	"Hanging in the Balance"	July 16, 2016	N/A
Just outside Buellton, California on Highway 101, a woman and her two daughters become trapped in their crushed car, dangling over the edge of a ravine, when a semi truck driver crashes into them, his own vehicle exploding and going over the edge.
13	6	"Buried By Bonfire"	July 23, 2016	N/A
College students get trapped when stacks of logs collapse during the construction of a massive bonfire at Texas A&M University in College Station, Texas.

=== Season 3 (2017-2018) ===
No. overall	No. in season	Title	Original release date	U.S. viewers (millions)
14	1	"Whiteout"	June 3, 2017	2.52
While traveling to Idaho, a couple gets stranded in white out conditions with their infant child after their pickup truck gets stuck in the snow in rural Nevada.
15	2	"Deliver Us from Evil"	June 10, 2017	2.27
A young woman endures years of abuse in a rural Minnesota cult before escaping and helping put the cult's charismatic leader behind bars.
16	3	"Lost in Snow"	June 17, 2017	2.75
When two boys go missing the night before Thanksgiving in Newburgh, New York, no one guesses that a plow buried them in a snow fort.
17	4	"Terror in the Library"	June 24, 2017	2.73
A US Veteran holds 10 people hostage in the Salt Lake City Public Library, one of which is a Salt Lake City police officer.
18	5	"Match Made in Hell"	July 1, 2017	2.61
A Las Vegas realtor using online dating meets a man who tries to kill her. The man escapes and does kill another of his previous love connections.
19	6	"Frozen on the Mountain"	July 8, 2017	2.66
An army veteran uses his U.S. flag to protect himself, his service dog and a fellow hiker after becoming trapped on a mountain in California during an unexpected blizzard.
20	7	"Home Invasion Horror"	July 15, 2017	2.81
In Ontario, Ohio, a banker's family is held hostage by a gunman determined to rob a bank without ever setting foot inside.
21	8	"The Woman Who Refused to Die"	December 29, 2017	3.75
In Clearwater, Florida, a young woman is violently stabbed to the death by her abusive boyfriend, but finds true love with one of the paramedics who rescues her.
22	9	"Fire on the Mountain"	August 4, 2018	N/A
The Valley Fire eviscerates northern California in 2015 forcing residents to become their own heroes in their desperate attempts to escape and survive.
