= Caught on Camera with Nick Cannon =

2014 American TV series

- Genre: Reality; Documentary
- Presented by: Nick Cannon
- Country of origin: United States
- No. of seasons: 3
- No. of episodes: 27

Production
- Executive producers: Aretha Marshall; Benjamin Ringe; Keith McKay; Knute Walker; Michael Goldman; Nick Cannon
- Running time: 42−44 minutes
- Production companies: NCredible Entertainment; Peacock Productions

Original release
- Network: NBC
- Release: December 19, 2014 – December 30, 2016

Caught on Camera with Nick Cannon is an American documentary reality television show on NBC. The show premiered on Friday, December 19, 2014. The show is hosted by Nick Cannon and it tells stories that are captured on cell phones, dash cams, security cams, and by news crews from around the world. The second season premiered on January 22, 2016. A third season premiered on October 14, 2016. The series officially ended on December 30, 2016. Also included are popular videos from Vine.

== Episodes ==
=== Series overview ===
Season	Episodes	Originally released	
Season	Episodes	First released	Last released
1	4	December 19, 2014	December 18, 2015
2	13	January 22, 2016	May 27, 2016
3	10	October 14, 2016	December 30, 2016

=== Season 1 (2014–15) ===
No. overall	No. in season	Title	Original release date	US viewers (millions)
1	1	"Viral"	December 19, 2014	4.62
2	2	"Octane"	December 26, 2014	4.67
3A (Note: Episode 3 aired in two separate half hour parts.)	3A	"High Adrenaline, Part 1"	March 7, 2015	2.55
3B	3B	"High Adrenaline, Part 2"	April 11, 2015	1.90
4	4	"High Holidays"	December 18, 2015	3.41

=== Season 2 (2016) ===
No. overall	No. in season	Title	Original release date	US viewers (millions)
5	1	"High Impact"	January 22, 2016	3.65
Clips include: a long car jump, a BASE jump going wrong and a cat fights off a dog.
6	2	"High Intensity"	February 5, 2016	3.57
Clips include: an Italian car crash, a prank master, a woman fights off a robber and a soldier returns home.
7	3	"High Energy"	February 12, 2016	4.19
Clips include: natures destruction and dramatic dash cam videos.
8	4	"High Powered"	February 19, 2016	3.69
Clips include: rescues, pranks on police and real or fake viral videos.
9	5	"High Adventure"	February 26, 2016	3.54
Clips include: daredevils, people with road rage, crazy people and real or fake viral videos.
10	6	"High Adrenaline"	March 11, 2016	3.24
Clips include: crashes, inspirational sports and Russian videos.
11	7	"High Octane"	March 18, 2016	3.62
Clips include: rescues, sports moments, dumb criminals and weddings gone wrong.
12	8	"High Risk"	March 25, 2016	3.74
Clips include: a race car drives off a mountain, a shark attack, a plane crash and a skydiver lands on power lines.
13	9	"High Anxiety"	April 15, 2016	3.20
Clips include: Internet stars, pranks and risky businesses.
14	10	"High Drama"	April 22, 2016	3.26
Clips include: daring rescues, motorcycle chases, escaped llamas and aliens.
15	11	"Hi Mom"	April 29, 2016	3.47
Clips include: a mother stopping a carjacker and another gives birth in a car.
16	12	"High Gear"	May 13, 2016	2.97
Clips include: an RV Fire, a homeowner attacks an intruder and Internet stars.
17	13	"High Jinx"	May 27, 2016	3.15

=== Season 3 (2016) ===
No. overall	No. in season	Title	Original release date	US viewers (millions)
18	1	"Wild Weather"	October 14, 2016	3.06
Clips include: wild weather stories such as twisters, lightning and floods.
19	2	"Rescues and Close Calls"	October 21, 2016	3.30
Clips include: stories of local heroes who rescue victims from deadly situations and live to tell the tale.
20	3	"The Kids Edition"	October 28, 2016	2.72
Clips include: various kids who went viral on YouTube.
21	4	"Humans are Awesome"	November 4, 2016	2.56
Clips include: heroes who were recorded saving victims that went viral.
22	5	"Game On!"	November 11, 2016	2.72
Clips include: kids playing high-adrenaline sports.
23	6	"Real or Fake?"	November 18, 2016	3.05
Clips include: viral videos that are either real or fake.
24	7	"Cutie and the Beast"	December 2, 2016	3.66
Clips include: kids and their pets.
25	8	"Surprise!"	December 9, 2016	3.19
26	9	"Rough Commute"	December 16, 2016	3.88
Clips include: Events on commuting.
27	10	"Thrills and Chills"	December 30, 2016	2.77
