= The Great American Baking Show season 4 =

The Great American Baking Show
- Season 4
- Starring: Anthony Adams; Emma Bunton; Paul Hollywood; Sherry Yard
- No. of episodes: 6

Release
- Original network: ABC
- Original release: December 6 – December 20, 2018

Season chronology
- ← Previous; Season 3 Next → Season 5

The fourth season of The Great American Baking Show, titled The Great American Baking Show: Holiday Edition, premiered December 6, 2018 on the ABC network as part of the year's 25 Days of Christmas lineup.

This is the first season hosted by Spice Girls member Emma Bunton. Returning for their second seasons are Anthony "Spice" Adams and Paul Hollywood. Joining the judging panel is three-time James Beard Award recipient and pastry chef Sherry Yard. This is the first season without original judge Johnny Iuzzini. Iuzzini was dismissed from the ABC network following sexual harassment allegations, days after the season three premiere and, prematurely, pulled the season off the air.

The competition concluded after six weeks, in which Tina Zaccardi was crowned the season winner. Amanda Nguyen and Andrea Maranville finished the competition as runners-up.

== Bakers ==
Baker	Hometown
Jason Arthur	Brooklyn, New York
John Blaney	Paso Robles, California
Jill Campbell	Sacramento, California
Destane Harris	Blue Island, Illinois
Jiwandeep "Jiwan" Kohli	San Diego, California
Andrea Maranville	Sherrill, New York
Amanda Nguyen	Tahoe City, California
Cheryl Norris	Portland, Oregon
Chris Tucker	San Pedro, California
Tina Zaccardi	Eastchester, New York

== Results summary ==
Elimination chart
Baker	1	2	3	4	5	6
Tina			SB		SB	WINNER
Amanda				SB		Runner-up
Andrea	SB					Runner-up
Destane					OUT	
Jiwan					OUT	
Chris		SB		OUT		
Jason			OUT			
John			OUT			
Cheryl		OUT				
Jill	OUT					

Color key:

The baker continued to the next round.
The baker was the week's Star Baker.
The baker was one of the judges' favorite bakers that week, but did not win Star Baker.
The baker was one of the judges' least favorite bakers that week, but was not eliminated.
The baker was eliminated from the competition.
The baker was a season runner-up.
The baker was the season winner.

== Episodes ==
=== Episode 1: Cake ===
Color key: Eliminated Star Baker Winner

Baker	Signature (Coffee cake)	Technical (Flourless chocolate cake)	Showstopper (18 mini cakes)
Amanda	Cranberry Coffee Cake	6th	Holiday Mocha Rounds
Andrea	Cinnamon Blueberry Coffee Cake	2nd	Great Grandma Grace's Chocolate Cakes
Cheryl	Apple Raspberry Coffee Cake	9th	Ginger Orange Cakes
Chris	Boozy Christmas Morning Coffee Cake	3rd	Chocolate Peanut Crunch Cakes
Destane	Cinnamon Swirl Coffee Cake	5th	Triple Chocolate Raspberry Cakes
Jason	Sticky Toffee Coffee Cake	4th	Chocolate Chestnut Yule Stumps
Jill	Cherry Almond Coffee Cake	8th	Lemon Sunshine Mini Cakes
Jiwan	Hazelnut–Coffee Coffee Cake	1st	Mini Tiramisu Cakes
John	Butter Makes It Better Pecan Coffee Cake	10th	Stronger Than Steele Date Nut Cakes
Tina	Double Chocolate Coffee Cake	7th	Autumn Harvest Cakes^{1}

^{1} During the showstopper bake, Tina scrapped her original recipe for pumpkin spice cake when it did not rise. She substituted a chocolate cake recipe she knew well, and presented her showstoppers as "Autumn Harvest Cakes".

=== Episode 2: Pastry ===
Baker	Signature (Slab pie)	Technical (Tarte Tatin)	Showstopper (24 eclairs)
Amanda	Grandma Minnie's Texas Pecan Pie	3rd	Holiday Party Eclairs
Andrea	Classic Holiday Apple Pie	5th	Coffee Time Eclairs
Cheryl	Pecan Caramel Pie	8th	White Chocolate & Pistachio Cream Eclairs
Chris	Chocolate Rye Pecan Pie	2nd	Festive Fall Eclairs
Destane	Strawberry Rhubarb Rosemary Slab Pie	7th	Lemon Thyme & Salted Caramel Eclairs
Jason	Ugly Sweater Slab Pie	1st	Après Ski Eclairs
Jiwan	Strawberry Rhubarb Slab Pie	4th	Chocolate Pistachio & Lemon Meringue Eclairs
John	Chocolate Bourbon Pecan Slab Pie	9th	Naughty List Eclairs
Tina	Pear and Lingonberry Slab Pie	6th	Key Lime Pie & Hazelnut Praline Eclairs

=== Episode 3: Cookies ===
Baker	Signature (24 rugelach)	Technical (20 florentines)	Showstopper (Cookie cream tart with 12 macarons)
Amanda	Chinese 5-Spice Rugelach	6th	Winter Wreath Cookie Tart
Andrea	Holiday Fig Rugelach	8th	Lemon Delight Wreath
Chris	Key West Rugelach	4th	Lemon Ginger Cream Tart
Destane	Apricot Walnut Cinnamon Rugelach	3rd	Blueberry Coconut Cream Tart
Jason	Mulled Fig & Walnut Rugelach	7th	Gingerbread Man Cream Tart
Jiwan	Spiced Citrus & Walnut Rugelach	1st	Peppermint Mocha Cream Tart
John	Reindeer Treat Rugelach	5th	Winter Snow Cream Tart
Tina	Chocolate Pistachio Cherry Rugelach	2nd	Trim The Tree Cookie Cream Tart

=== Episode 4: Bread ===
Baker	Signature (4 flatbreads)	Technical (Kanellängd)	Showstopper (3D bread centerpiece)
Amanda	Cornbread Dressing Flatbread	3rd	Holiday Tower
Andrea	Herb-y Garlic Naan Flatbread	2nd	Santa Claus is Coming to Town Bread
Chris	Turmeric Lemon Thyme Flatbread	4th	Spiced Holiday Center Piece
Destane	Garlic & Herbs Flatbread	1st	Holiday Flower Pot
Jiwan	Za'atar Crusted Flatbread	6th	Holiday Bread Wreath
Tina	Lemon Dill Garlic Flatbread	5th	Christmas Eve Center Piece

=== Episode 5: Semi-Final ===
Baker	Signature (Pot de creme)	Technical (Princess cake)	Showstopper (Winter gingerbread scene)
Amanda	No Ordinary Orange Pot de Creme	1st	Lake Tahoe Log Cabin
Andrea	Christmas Time Custard	4th	Home for the Holidays
Destane	Butterscotch Pot de Creme	3rd	Winter Wonderland at Grandma's
Jiwan	Dark Chocolate & Raspberry Pot de Creme	5th	Gingerbread Winter Castle
Tina	Goat Cheese & Fig Pot de Creme	2nd	Winter Woodland Wonderland

=== Episode 6: Final ===
Baker	Signature (12 cannoli)	Technical (Baumkuchen)	Showstopper (Holiday cake)
Amanda	You and Me Cannoli	1st	Tahoe Forest Cake
Andrea	Upstate New York Cannoli	3rd	Christmas Celebration Cake
Tina	Traditional Cannoli Siciliano	2nd	Festive Christmas Cake

== Ratings ==
Viewership and ratings per episode of The Great American Baking Show season 4
No.	Title	Air date	Rating/share (18–49)	Viewers (millions)	Ref.
1–2	"Cake Week" "Pastry Week"	December 6, 2018	0.7/3	3.69	
3–4	"Cookie Week" "Bread Week"	December 13, 2018	0.6/3	3.04	
5–6	"Semi-Final Week" "Final Week"	December 20, 2018	0.7/3	3.59	
