= The Great American Baking Show season 5 =

The Great American Baking Show
- Season 5
- Starring: Anthony Adams; Emma Bunton; Paul Hollywood; Sherry Yard
- No. of episodes: 8

Release
- Original network: ABC
- Original release: December 12, 2019 – January 2, 2020

Season chronology
- ← Previous; Season 4

The fifth season of The Great American Baking Show premiered December 12, 2019 on the ABC network. It is the second season under the title The Great American Baking Show: Holiday Edition. Emma Bunton and Anthony "Spice" Adams return as hosts. Returning in the judging panel for their third and second seasons, respectively, are Paul Hollywood and Sherry Yard.

== Bakers ==
Baker	Hometown
Alex Willis	Los Angeles, California
Brother Andrew Corriente	Arcadia, California
Bianca Jackson	Seattle, Washington
Carlos Marquina	Ontario, California
Dana Commandatore	Los Angeles, California
Helen Pantazis	St. Louis, Missouri
Marissa Troeschel	Portland, Oregon
Sally Newton	Manhattan, Kansas
Sarita Gelner	St. Louis, Missouri
Tanya Ott	Bethalto, Illinois

== Results summary ==
Elimination chart
Baker	1	2	3	4	5	6	7	8
Br. Andrew		SB						WINNER
Dana					SB		SB	Runner-up
Marissa				SB		SB		Runner-up
Alex	SB		SB				OUT	
Sarita						OUT		
Tanya					OUT			
Bianca				OUT				
Sally			OUT					
Carlos		OUT						
Helen	OUT							

Color key:

The baker got through to the next round.
The baker was the week's Star Baker.
The baker was one of the judges' favorite bakers that week, but did not win Star Baker.
The baker was one of the judges' least favorite bakers that week, but was not eliminated.
The baker was eliminated from the competition.
The baker was the season runner-up.
The baker was the season winner.

== Episodes ==
=== Episode 1: Cake ===
Color key: Eliminated Star Baker Winner

For the signature challenge, the bakers had two hours to make a single-layer olive oil cake. For the technical challenge, Sherry assigned an angel food cake, which the bakers had two and a half hours to complete. For the showstopper, the bakers had three and a half hours to make a chocolate gateau with three layers and chocolate icing.

Baker	Signature (Olive Oil Cake)	Technical (Angel Food Cake)	Showstopper (Chocolate Gateau)
Alex	Thanksgiving Leftovers Cake	5th	Christmas Fireplace Gateau
Br. Andrew	Christmas in California Cake	3rd	Christmas Present Gateau
Bianca	Wintry Apple Pie Olive Oil Cake	4th	Chocolate Cascades Gateau
Carlos	Honey Almond Upside Down Cake	10th	Santa Lucia Spiced Gateau
Dana	Christmas Morning Olive Oil Cake	2nd	Sicilian Forest Gateau
Helen	Morning Noon and Night Cake	8th	Grandma Anne's Jewel Chocolate Cake
Marissa	Ruby Red Grapefruit Thyme Cake	7th	Winter Forest Chocolate Gateau
Sally	Yuzu Ginger Olive Oil Cake	1st	Chocolate Raspberry Celebration Gateau
Sarita	Spiced Pear Olive Oil Cake	6th	Grand Orange Praline Chocolate Gateau
Tanya	Apple a Day Olive Oil Cake	9th	Fleece Navidad Gateau

=== Episode 2: Bread ===
For the signature challenge, the bakers had an hour and 45 minutes to make one dozen savory breadsticks. For the technical challenge, set by Paul, the bakers had two and a half hours to make a traditional cob loaf. For the showstopper, the bakers had four and a half hours to make a bread sculpture inspired by "The Twelve Days of Christmas", with at least two flavors of bread.

Baker	Signature (12 Breadsticks)	Technical (Cob Loaf)	Showstopper (Twelve Days of Christmas Bread Sculpture)
Alex	Yakitori Breadsticks	2nd	Christmas Drummer Drumming
Br. Andrew	Pantry Breadsticks	8th	Morning Sweet & Savory Holiday Loaves
Bianca	Southern Spicy Cornstix	1st	Swimmin' in Seattle
Carlos	Sweet Potato and Za'atar Breadsticks	3rd	Nine Ladies Dancing Flamenco
Dana	Crispy Carbonara Breadsticks	5th	Turtle Dove Tattoo Bread
Marissa	Egyptian Spiced Grissini	4th	Swimming Swan
Sally	Hot 'n' Crispy Braided Breadsticks	9th	Golden Ornament Christmas Tree
Sarita	Smoky Rosemary and Cheese Grissini	7th	Swam Family A Swimmin'
Tanya	Grissini Caliente	6th	Perfect Partridge in a Pear Tree

=== Episode 3: Spice ===
The signature challenge was to bake a dozen cinnamon rolls in two and a half hours, including an icing or drizzle. The technical challenge was to bake a dozen Linzer cookies in an hour and a half. For the signature, bakers had five hours to build a holiday gingerbread scene.

Baker	Signature (12 Cinnamon Rolls)	Technical (12 Linzer Cookies)	Showstopper (Holiday Gingerbread Scene)
Alex	Mom's Christmas Morning Cinnamon Rolls	3rd	Santa is Stuck! Present Tower
Br. Andrew	Lime and Vietnamese Cinnamon Rolls	7th	Christmas Mass in a Winter Wonderland
Bianca	Christmas Morning Cinnamon Rolls	6th	Snowboarding for the Holidays
Dana	Dana Banana Cinnamon Rolls	5th	Christmas in Los Angeles
Marissa	Cinnamon Babka Rolls	2nd	German Christmas Market
Sally	Woke Up in Rio Cinnamon Rolls	8th	Christmas at the Owls' Love Nest
Sarita	Sri Lanka Cinnamon Rolls	4th	Wintry Nature Lodge
Tanya	Saturday Morning Breakfast Rolls	1st	Overnight Delivery

=== Episode 4: Dessert ===
In the signature challenge, the bakers had an hour and 45 minutes to make madeleines. For the technical, the bakers had to make Queen of Puddings in one hour and 30 minutes. For the showstopper, the bakers had four and a half hours to make a cheesecake tower of at least three tiers, with two of the same flavor and one different.

Baker	Signature (24 Madeleines)	Technical (Queen of Puddings)	Showstopper (Cheesecake Tower)
Alex	Christmas Doodle Madeleines	1st	"Cup of Tea" Cheesecake Tower
Br. Andrew	Away From Home Madeleines	7th	Posh Christmas Cheesecake Tower
Bianca	Naughty and Nice Madeleines	2nd	"Out of This World" Holiday Tiered Cheesecakes
Dana	French Manicured Madeleines	6th	Christina's Christmas Cheesecakes
Marissa	Nuts For Tea Madeleines	5th	Club Car to Vermont
Sarita	Afternoon Tea Madeleines	4th	Winter Garden Cheesecake
Tanya	Sugar and Spice Madeleines	3rd	A Perfect "Pear"ing

=== Episode 5: Pastry ===
In the signature challenge, the bakers had an hour and 45 minutes to make a citrus tart. For the technical, the bakers had to make hand-raised pies in two hours and 15 minutes. For the showstopper, the bakers had four and a half hours to make Napoleons and palmiers.

Baker	Signature (Citrus Tart)	Technical (6 Hand-Raised Pies)	Showstopper (6 Napoleons & 12 Palmiers)
Alex	Japanese Winter Remedy Tart	1st	Very Berry Holiday Napoleons and Palmiers
Br. Andrew	Ginger and Citrus Tart	2nd	Winter Morning Napoleons and Palmiers
Dana	Richmond's Cherry Lime Tart	4th	Fennel Palmiers and Carmel Latte Napoleons
Marissa	Mandar-Lemon Tart	5th	Sugar on Snow Napoleons and Golden Rugelach Palmiers
Sarita	Boxing Day Tart	3rd	When Flakey is a Good Thing Napoleons and Palmiers
Tanya	Shoots for the Stars Clementine Tart	6th	Keep Calm and Napole-ons

=== Episode 6: Cookie ===
In the signature challenge, the bakers had two hours and 30 minutes to make winter sugar cookies. For the technical, the bakers had to make fortune cookies in one hour and 30 minutes. For the showstopper, the bakers had four and a half hours to make macaron tower.

Baker	Signature (18 Winter Sugar Cookies)	Technical (12 Almond-Ginger Fortune Cookies)	Showstopper (Macaron Tower)
Alex	Snuggly Kitten Sweater Sugar Cookies	1st	Dark Winter Masquerade Macaron Tower
Br. Andrew	Winter Breakfast Sugar Cookies	4th	Dream Holiday Macaron Tower
Dana	Coffee To Go Sugar Cookies	5th	Monochrome Macaron Tower
Marissa	View From the Cabin Window Sugar Cookies	3rd	New Year's Eve Black & White Ball Macaron Tower
Sarita	Ben and Tilly's Lost Mitten Sugar Cookies	2nd	Cocktail Party Macaron Tower

=== Episode 7: Semi-Finals ===
In the signature challenge, the bakers had three hours to make two varieties of savory canapés. For the technical, the bakers had to make soufflés in 40 minutes. For the showstopper, the bakers had three and a half hours to make an Opera cake.

Baker	Signature (Canapés)	Technical (4 Soufflés)	Showstopper (Opera Cake)
Alex	Thai-Inspired Party Platter	2nd	Jolita Opera Cake
Br. Andrew	Sophisticated Childhood Bites	4th	Opera for Mom
Dana	Italian Comfort Canapés	1st	Neapolitan Opera Cake
Marissa	Feast of Several Fishes	3rd	Cherries Jubilee Opera Cake

=== Episode 8: Finals ===
In the signature challenge, the bakers had two hours and 30 minutes to make choux buns. For the technical, the bakers had to make a Fraisier cake in two hours and 30 minutes. For the showstopper, the bakers had three and a half hours to make three different kinds of mini-desserts.

Baker	Signature (24 Choux Buns)	Technical (Fraisier Cake)	Showstopper (Mini-Desserts)
Br. Andrew	Filipino American Choux Buns	2nd	Baking My Way Through Life
Dana	Mexican & Californian Choux Buns	1st	My Favorite Things
Marissa	Bollos De Mercado Mexicana Choux Buns	3rd	A Nutty New Year

== Ratings ==
Viewership and ratings per episode of The Great American Baking Show season 5
No.	Title	Air date	Rating/share (18–49)	Viewers (millions)	Ref.
1–2	"Cake and Bread Week"	December 12, 2019	0.5/3	2.89	
3–4	"Spice and Dessert Week"	December 19, 2019	0.5/3	2.67	
5–6	"Pastry and Cookie Week"	December 26, 2019	0.5/3	2.75	
7–8	"Semi-final and Final"	January 2, 2020	0.6/3	3.54	
