= The Great American Baking Show season 3 =

The Great American Baking Show
- Season 3
- Starring: Ayesha Curry; Anthony Adams; Paul Hollywood; Johnny Iuzzini
- No. of episodes: 2 (4 unaired)

Release
- Original network: ABC
- Original release: December 7, 2017

Season chronology
- ← Previous; Season 2 Next → Season 4

The third season of The Great American Baking Show aired on December 7, 2017 with a two-hour premiere on ABC. The first two episodes aired back-to-back as part of ABC's 25 Days of Christmas lineup before being pulled by ABC on December 13, 2017 following sexual misconduct allegations against judge Johnny Iuzzini.

This is the first season for new hosts Ayesha Curry and Anthony "Spice" Adams along with The Great British Bake Off judge, Paul Hollywood, who joined judge Johnny Iuzzini. Season two baker, Antoinette Love, who withdrew from the competition following her father's death, returned to the competition. The show was filmed in Iver Heath, UK over a three-week time period. The shooting sequence was two days of filming followed by one day break during those three weeks.

On December 21, 2017, the day in which the finale was originally to air, ABC announced that Vallery Lomas won the competition, beating out runners-up Cindy Maliniak and Molly Brodak in the final week. Lomas' winning dish was a three pastry/dessert tower.

== Bakers ==
| Baker | Hometown |
|---|---|
| Antwine "Antoinette" Love | Charlotte, North Carolina |
| Bryan McKinnon | Highland, Utah |
| Cindy Maliniak | Medway, Massachusetts |
| Hector De Haro | Glendale, California |
| JC Gregg | Kansas City, Missouri |
| Jessie Salzbrun | Cincinnati, Ohio |
| Father Kyle Schnippel | Cincinnati, Ohio |
| Molly Brodak | Atlanta, Georgia |
| Nick Bryan | Los Angeles, California |
| Vallery Lomas | New York, New York |

== Results summary ==
Elimination chart
| Baker | 1 | 2 | 3^{[a]} | 4^{[a]} | 5^{[a]} | 6^{[b]} |
|---|---|---|---|---|---|---|
| Vallery | | SB | | | | WINNER |
| Cindy | | | | SB | | Runner-up |
| Molly | | | SB | | | Runner-up |
| Antoinette | | | | | OUT | |
| Bryan | | | | | OUT | |
| Hector | | | | OUT | | |
| JC | | | OUT | | | |
| Jessie | SB | | OUT | | | |
| Kyle | | OUT | | | | |
| Nick | OUT | | | | | |

Color key:

The baker continued to the next round.
The baker was the week's Star Baker.
The baker was one of the judges' favorite bakers, but did not win Star Baker.
The baker was one of the judges' least favorite bakers, but was not eliminated.
The baker was eliminated from the competition.
The baker was a season runner-up.
The baker was the season winner.

^{[a]} The Star Baker and elimination results for episodes 3, 4 and 5 were released on the show's official Facebook page and ABC's YouTube.
^{[b]} ABC announced the winner and runners-up in a season recap posted the day the finale was to be broadcast.

== Episodes ==
=== Episode 1: Cake ===
For the first signature bake, the bakers were given two hours to bake a "naked" cake, a cake that is not entirely covered in icing. The technical bake, assigned by Paul Hollywood, required the bakers to create nine identical lamingtons covered with a white chocolate coating and coconut flakes. In the showstopper, bakers had two hours and thirty minutes to bake a decorative holiday Swiss roll with an evenly distributed spiral filling.

Color key: Eliminated Star Baker Winner

| Baker | Signature (Naked cake) | Technical (9 Lamingtons) | Showstopper (Swiss roll) |
|---|---|---|---|
| Antoinette | Deconstructed Hummingbird Cake | 3rd | Cranberry Curd Swiss Roll |
| Bryan | Lemon Rosemary Naked Cake | 4th | Cardamom Cinnamon Swiss Roll |
| Cindy | Gingerbread Naked Cake | 8th | Pistachio Sponge Swiss Roll |
| Hector | Salted and Spiced Caramel Naked Cake | 5th | Sweet Potato Gifts Swiss Roll |
| JC | Eggnog Naked Cake | 2nd | Peace on Earth Swiss Roll |
| Jessie | Spiced Pumpkin Naked Cake | 1st | Fireplace Mocha Bourbon Swiss Roll |
| Kyle | Pumpkin Spice Naked Cake | 6th | Manger Scene Swiss Roll |
| Molly | Spiced Honey Orange Naked Cake | 7th | White Chocolate Raspberry Almond Swiss Roll |
| Nick | Eggnog Christmas Naked Cake | 10th | Second Day of Christmas Swiss Roll |
| Vallery | Cranberry Filled Lemon Chiffon Naked Cake | 9th | Christmas Kaleidoscope Swiss Roll |

=== Episode 2: Morning Treats ===
In the show's first morning treats week, the bakers had two hours and thirty minutes to either bake or fry one dozen yeasted donuts complete with a filling of their choice. For the technical, bakers created eight identical savory breakfast hand pies with distinct flaky layers and an even filling. The showstopper of the week required bakers to make a centerpiece sweet loaf with a distinct spiral on the inside.

| Baker | Signature (12 Doughnuts) | Technical (8 Hand pies) | Showstopper (Sweet loaf) |
|---|---|---|---|
| Antoinette | Maple Bacon Donuts | 4th | Raspberry Almond Loaf |
| Bryan | Ginger Lime Donuts | 3rd | Cinnamon Raspberry Santa |
| Cindy | Apricot Spiced Donuts | 8th | Polish Nut Roll |
| Hector | Mexican Eggnog Donuts | 5th | Chocolate Marzipan Wreath |
| JC | Baked Pumpkin Donuts | 2nd | Pistachio Frangipane Wreath |
| Jessie | Nutmeg Spiced Donuts | 7th | Orange Cardamom Snowflake |
| Kyle | Baked Cinnamon Bourbon Donuts | 9th | Cinnamon Wreath with Macarons |
| Molly | Pączki Cranberry Sage Donuts | 6th | Pumpkin Walnut Challah Wreath |
| Vallery | Orange Chocolate Glazed Donuts | 1st | Blackberry Lemon King Cake |

=== Unaired episodes ===
Highlights from the unaired desserts week and cookies week were released on the show's official Facebook page and ABC's YouTube channel on December 29, 2017. French week and finals week followed on January 2, 2018.

==== Dessert ====
| Baker | Signature (Cream pie) | Technical (6 Crèmes caramel) | Showstopper (Macaron tower) |
|---|---|---|---|
| Antoinette | —N/a | 1st | —N/a |
| Bryan | —N/a | —N/a | Nutty Chocolate Christmas Tree Macaron Tower |
| Cindy | Minnesota French Silk Creme Pie | —N/a | —N/a |
| Hector | Coconut Cream Pie with a Twist | —N/a | Citrus Christmas Macaron Tower |
| JC | —N/a | —N/a | Ho Ho Ho Macaron Tower |
| Jessie | —N/a | —N/a | —N/a |
| Molly | Bourbon Coconut Cream Pie | —N/a | Hazelnut and Juniper Macaron Tower |
| Vallery | —N/a | —N/a | —N/a |

==== Cookies ====
| Baker | Signature (24 Sandwich cookies) | Technical (12 Tuiles) | Showstopper (Gingerbread house) |
|---|---|---|---|
| Antoinette | —N/a | —N/a | —N/a |
| Bryan | Raspberry Advent Sandwich Cookies | 1st | —N/a |
| Cindy | Coconut Cookies with Pomegranate and Cherry Filling | —N/a | "Winter Fun in Medway" Gingerbread House |
| Hector | Shortbread Cajeta Sandwiches | —N/a | —N/a |
| Molly | —N/a | —N/a | "Snow Day at the Chicken Coop" Gingerbread House |
| Vallery | —N/a | —N/a | —N/a |

==== French (Semi-Finals) ====
| Baker | Signature (4 Frangipane tarts) | Technical (Paris–Brest) | Showstopper (Opera cake) |
|---|---|---|---|
| Antoinette | —N/a | —N/a | Chocolate Orange Opera Cake |
| Bryan | Cran-gipane Tarts | —N/a | Crème Brûlée Opera Cake |
| Cindy | Apple Frangipane Tarts | —N/a | Strawberry Champagne Opera Cake |
| Molly | —N/a | 1st | Northern Lights Opera Cake |
| Vallery | Orange Plum Frangipane Tarts | —N/a | —N/a |

==== Final ====
| Baker | Signature (24 Palmiers) | Technical (Chocolate caramel tart) | Showstopper (Tower of treats) |
|---|---|---|---|
| Cindy | Bacon Horseradish and Pecan Cinnamon Heart Palmiers | —N/a | Family Celebration Tower |
| Molly | Hibiscus and BBQ Bacon Palmiers | 1st | Holiday Cheer Tower |
| Vallery | New York New Year's and Holiday Spice Palmiers | —N/a | International Showstopper Tower |

== Ratings ==
Viewership and ratings per episode of The Great American Baking Show season 3
| No. | Title | Air date | Rating/share (18–49) | Viewers (millions) | Ref. |
|---|---|---|---|---|---|
| 1–2 | "Cake Week" "Morning Treats Week" | December 7, 2017 | 0.8/3 | 3.84 | |
