= The Great American Baking Show season 2 =

The Great American Baking Show
- Season 2
- Starring: Nia Vardalos; Ian Gomez; Mary Berry; Johnny Iuzzini
- No. of episodes: 8

Release
- Original network: ABC
- Original release: December 1, 2016 – January 12, 2017

Season chronology
- ← Previous; Season 1 Next → Season 3

The second season of The Great American Baking Show begun December 1, 2016 with a two-hour premiere on ABC. This is the first season to air under its current name, dropping the "holiday" title. Ten amateur bakers competed in an eight-week competition for the title of America's best amateur baker.

Husband and wife duo Nia Vardalos and Ian Gomez returned as hosts, alongside judges Mary Berry and American pastry chef Johnny Iuzzini. This was the final season of Vardalos and Gomez hosting the show as well as Berry's final season as judge.

On January 12, 2017, after eight weeks of competition, Amanda Faber won the season with Stephanie Chen as runner-up. This is the first season in Bake Off history to have two voluntary exits and a final two instead of a final three on finale week. Antoinette Love, who withdrew from the competition tis season, returned for Season 3, where she finished in 4th place.

== Bakers ==
Baker	Occupation	Hometown
Amanda Faber	Housewife	Atlanta, Georgia
Antoinette Love	Business representative	Charlotte, North Carolina
Ashlyn Morgan	Landscape designer	Englewood, Tennessee
Courtney Carey	Choir chonductor	Harlem, New York
Jennie Dembowski	Graphic designer	Chicago, Illinois
Jeremiah Bills	Music teacher	Sacramento, California
Michael Wolfe	Physician	Brooklyn, New York
Nancy Judd	Retired	Alpine, Utah
Prachi Chaudhari	Housewife	South Plainfield, New Jersey
Stephanie Chen	Marketing executive	Los Angeles, California

== Results summary ==
Elimination chart
Baker	1	2^{[a]}	3^{[b]}	4^{[c]}	5	6	7	8
Amanda				SB				WINNER
Stephanie	SB						SB	Runner-up
Jennie						SB	OUT	
Jeremiah		SB				OUT		
Prachi					OUT			
Ashlyn			SB	OUT				
Michael				WD				
Courtney		OUT						
Antoinette		WD						
Nancy	OUT							

Color key:

The baker continued to the next round.
The baker was the week's Star Baker.
The baker was one of the judges' favorite bakers that week, but did not win Star Baker.
The baker was one of the judges' least favorite bakers that week, but was not eliminated.
The baker withdrew from the competition.
The baker was eliminated from the competition.
The baker was a season runner-up.
The baker was the season winner.

^{[a]} Following a family emergency the night before week 2's technical, Antoinette withdrew from the competition.
^{[b]} There was no elimination this week.
^{[c]} As the result of an overnight illness, Michael withdrew from the competition.

== Episodes ==
=== Episode 1: Cake ===
In their first signature bake, the ten bakers created a winter-themed Bundt cake in under two hours. The cakes required a swirl or filling on the inside, with frosting and lace on the outside. Mary Berry's apple almond cake served as the first technical bake of the season. Lastly, in the showstopper, the bakers had five hours to show off their decorative and structural skills in their multi-tiered holiday celebration cakes.

Color key: Eliminated Withdrew Star Baker Winner

Baker	Signature (Winter Bundt cake)	Technical (Apple cake)	Showstopper (Multi-tiered holiday cake)
Amanda	Cardamom and Espresso Swirl Bundt Cake	4th	White Christmas Cake
Antoinette	Cream Cheese Pumpkin Bundt Cake	8th	Winter Spice Cake
Ashlyn	Chestnut Bundt Cake	5th	Coconut Present Cake
Courtney	Cranberry and Cherry Bundt Cake	7th	Chocolate Garam masala Cake
Jennie	Coconut Eggnog and Chocolate Bundt Cake	3rd	Winter Wonderland Orange Spice Cake
Jeremiah	Mandarin and Chocolate Bundt Cake	1st	Azorean Winter Forest Cake
Michael	Cherry Bourbon Bundt Cake	9th	Winter Holiday Cake
Nancy	Rich Chocolate Raspberry Bundt Cake	10th	Winter White Peppermint Cake
Prachi	Chocolate Pumpkin Rose Bundt Cake	2nd	Eggnog Celebration Cake
Stephanie	Pumpkin Ginger Spice Bundt Cake	6th	California Dreamin' Cake

=== Episode 2: Cookies ===
Bakers were set the challenge to bake twelve bar cookies of identical size and shape. The technical featured biscotti, a "twice-baked" cookie with delicate chocolate piping according to Johnny Iuzzini's recipe. The night before the showstopper, it was revealed that Antoinette had to leave the competition due to a family emergency. With eight bakers left, the showstopper and elimination continued as they had five hours to create a three-dimensional cookie scene with a holiday twist.

Baker	Signature (Bar cookies)	Technical (Biscotti)	Showstopper (3D iced cookie scene)
Amanda	Pistachio Bars	3rd	Christmas Tree and Presents
Antoinette	Bourbon Pecan Bars	2nd	—N/a
Ashlyn	Rose and Orange Blossom Bars	9th	Smoky Mountain Christmas
Courtney	Sweet Potato Bars	7th	Winter Neighborhood
Jennie	Cherry Almond Bars	6th	Spirit of the Season
Jeremiah	Portuguese Morgado Bars	1st	Christmas Tree and Wreaths
Michael	Cranberry Almond Ginger Bars	4th	Sleigh and Reindeers
Prachi	Fruit and Nut Oat Bars	8th	Gateway of India in Winter
Stephanie	Blackberry Basil Corn Bars	5th	Holidays in Space!

=== Episode 3: Bread ===
In the competition's first bread week, bakers had two hours to create twelve savory yeast dinner rolls in under two hours. The technical bake of the week was stollen, a German Christmas fruit and nut bread with rum and a sausage-shaped marzipan in the middle. In the final bake of the week, bakers created another three-dimensional holiday centerpiece for the showstopper bake, this time with different and unique collections of breads. With the judges failing to reach a consensus as to who would go that week, no one was eliminated.

Baker	Signature (Yeast rolls)	Technical (Stollen)	Showstopper (3D bread centerpiece)
Amanda	"Lucky Number 3" Rolls	7th	Turtle Dove Love Nest
Ashlyn	Southern Cheese and Onion Rolls	3rd	Potted Christmas Tree
Jennie	Brown Butter Garlic Parmesan Rolls	5th	Sweet Christmas Tree
Jeremiah	Portuguese Rolls	6th	Massa Sovada Sleigh
Michael	Classic Dinner Rolls	2nd	Partridge in a Pear Tree
Prachi	Herb and Onion Cloverleaf Rolls	4th	Bird Nest
Stephanie	Green Onion Sesame Rolls	1st	Super Santa

=== Episode 4: Pies and Tarts ===
The night before the signature bake, Michael withdrew from the competition due to illness. With six bakers left in the competition, pies and tarts week began with a meringue pie baked and torched under a two-hour frame. The technical bake challenged bakers to create a free form, pear-shaped pear tart with an additional frangipane layer below the pears. For the showstopper challenge, bakers had four hours to make three dozen savory tartlets in two unique crusts and flavors.

Baker	Signature (Meringue pie)	Technical (Patridge in a Pear Tart)	Showstopper (Hors d'oeuvre tartlets)
Amanda	Whiskey Peach Pie	2nd	Pimento Tarts & Carnitas Tartlets
Ashlyn	Spicebush Eggnog Pie	4th	Spinach Vol-Au-Vents & Grit Tartlets
Jennie	Chocolate Banana Cream Pie	1st	Shrimp and Cream Cheese Tartlets & Prosciutto and Date Tartlets
Jeremiah	Passion Fruit Pie	6th	Sea Urchin Mousse Tartlets & Fig and Goat Cheese Tartlets
Prachi	Coconut Custard Pie	5th	Mathri Tartlets & Vol-Au-Vents with Paneer Filling
Stephanie	Strawberry Hibiscus Pie	3rd	Kalbi Short Rib Tarts & Chinese BBQ Shiitake Galettes

=== Episode 5: Chocolate ===
Chocolate week began with bakers attempting to create twelve miniature molten lava cakes with an oozing chocolate center within two hours. Johnny Iuzzini's specialization on chocolate increased the pressure among the remaining bakers in the next technical. Bakers had to make twenty-five truffles with two different types of ganache: a hazelnut coffee white chocolate ganache and a banana coconut rum ganache. The showstopper tested the bakers' mousse skills with two distinct flavors and chocolate decorations as a finishing touch.

Baker	Signature (Molten chocolate cake)	Technical (Chocolate truffle)	Showstopper (Naked mousse cake)
Amanda	Hot Chocolate Lava Cakes	1st	Hazelnut, Espresso, and Chocolate Mousse Cake
Jennie	Hazelnut Chocolate Lava Cakes	5th	Spiked Latte Mousse Cake
Jeremiah	Kaffir Lime and Coconut Lava Cakes	3rd	Chocolate and Raspberry Mousse Cake
Prachi	Salted Caramel Lava Cakes	4th	Fig and Chocolate Mousse Cake
Stephanie	Earl Grey Salted Caramel Lava Cakes	2nd	Blackberry, Coffee, and Pistachio Mousse Cake

=== Episode 6: Custard and Meringue ===
The final four bakers began the week by baking 12 crème brûlées with the flavors of their choice in two hours. Next in the technical, bakers tested their skills in Mary Berry's French recipe œufs en neige, or "eggs in snow". The judges looked for six perfectly poached meringues and crèmes anglaise. The quarter-final showstopper required the bakers to bake two dozen pavlovas of two different meringues and fillings within four hours.

Baker	Signature (Crème brûlée)	Technical (œufs en neige)	Showstopper (Pavlovas)
Amanda	Maple and Peanut Butter Crème Brûlée	2nd	Raspberry Chocolate and Coconut Lychee Pavlovas
Jennie	Apple Pie Crème Brûlée	4th	Chocolate Almond Butter and Rose Water Pistachio Pavlovas
Jeremiah	Chestnut Crème Brûlée	1st	Chocolate Mandarin and Raspberry Rose Pavlovas
Stephanie	Maple Fennel Crème Brûlée	3rd	Dark Chocolate Coffee and Strawberry Black Pepper Pavlovas

=== Episode 7: Pâtisserie ===
In the semi-final signature bake, the final three bakers created twenty-four petits fours, or mini cakes delicately covered with fondant and icing. With two more chances left to impress the judges, bakers had to recreate twelve crullers, a fried donut-like choux pastry, in under ninety minutes. For the showstopper, a sharing-size mille-feuille (also known as the Napoleon) tested the final three's precision on making a perfect puff pastry.

Baker	Signature (Petit four)	Technical (Cruller)	Showstopper (Mille-feuille)
Amanda	Mother Daughter Tea Party Petits Fours	1st	Blackberry and Pear Mille-Feuille
Jennie	Honey Walnut and Lemon Kiwi Petits Fours	2nd	Strawberries and Cream Mille-Feuille
Stephanie	Rosemary Olive Oil and Chocolate Hazelnut Petits Fours	3rd	Banana Cream Pie Mille-Feuille

=== Episode 8: Final ===
Three challenges remain for the final two bakers before a winner is crowned. For the signature bake, the final two had two hours to bake twenty-four handheld savory pastries and tested the bakers' technical detailing in the creation of different doughs and fillings. In the final technical, Mary Berry set the challenge on the bakers to create a British Battenberg cake with a checkerboard pattern and precise amounts of marzipan and jam on the inside and out. The final bake of the season put all of the bakers' skills to the test with a Winter celebration dessert display of cakes, cookies, custards, pastries and additional desserts of their choosing.

Baker	Signature (Savory pastries)	Technical (Battenberg cake)	Showstopper (Winter dessert display)
Amanda	Breakfast and Lunch Handheld Pastries	2nd	Winter Warm Up Dessert Display
Stephanie	American Brunch & Chinese Dim Sum Pies	1st	Winter Celebration Display

== Ratings ==
Viewership and ratings per episode of The Great American Baking Show season 2
No.	Title	Air date	Rating/share (18–49)	Viewers (millions)	Ref.
1–2	"Cake Week" "Cookie Week"	December 1, 2016	1.0/4	4.62	
3	"Bread Week"	December 8, 2016	0.9/3	4.22	
4	"Pies and Tarts Week"	December 15, 2016	0.8/3	3.66	
5–6	"Chocolate Week" "Custard and Meringue Week"	December 22, 2016	0.9/3	3.92	
7	"Pâtisserie Week"	January 5, 2017	1.0/4	5.02	
8	"Final Week"	January 12, 2017	1.0/3	5.19	
