= The Great American Baking Show season 1 =

The Great American Baking Show
- Season 1
- Starring: Nia Vardalos; Ian Gomez; Mary Berry; Johnny Iuzzini
- No. of episodes: 4

Release
- Original network: ABC
- Original release: November 30 – December 21, 2015

Season chronology
- Next → Season 2

The first season of The Great American Baking Show, released under the title The Great Holiday Baking Show, premiered on ABC on November 30, 2015 as part of ABC's holiday programming schedule. Six amateur bakers competed in twelve challenges throughout the competition for the title of America's best holiday baker.

This season was hosted by husband and wife duo Nia Vardalos and Ian Gomez. The judging panel consisted of original The Great British Bake Off judge Mary Berry and American pastry chef Johnny Iuzzini. As with the British series, this season was filmed in Welford Park with slight holiday decorative modifications made in the set known as "The Tent".

After four weeks of competition, Lauren Katz was crowned the winner with Nicole Silva and Tim Samson as runners-up.

== Bakers ==
Baker	Occupation	Hometown
Ainslie Forsum	Account manager	Los Angeles, California
Eddie Downs	Vocalist	Chicago, Illinois
Grace Langan	Hospital administrator	Staten Island, New York
Lauren Katz	Housewife	Ashburn, Virginia
Nicole Silva	Teacher	Hampton, Georgia
Tim Samson	Marketing director	Wildwood, New Jersey

== Results summary ==
Elimination chart
Baker	1	2	3	4
Lauren	SB			WINNER
Nicole				Runner-Up
Tim			SB	Runner-Up
Ainslie			OUT	
Eddie		OUT		
Grace	OUT			

Color Key:

The baker continued to the next round.
The baker was the week's Star Baker.
The baker was one of the judges' favorite bakers that week, but did not win Star Baker.
The baker was one of the judges' least favorite bakers that week, but was not eliminated.
The baker was eliminated from the competition.
The baker a season runner-up.
The baker was the season winner.

== Episodes ==
=== Episode 1: Cookies ===
For the first signature bake, the bakers were given two hours to make two unique batches of ten cookies, with one batch having icing. Later in the technical bake, bakers only had one hour to bake sixteen brandy snaps according to Mary Berry's recipe. The final bake of the week called the showstopper required bakers to bake a structured gingerbread with decorative designs and cookies around it within five hours.

Color key: Eliminated Star Baker Winner

Baker	Signature (Cookies)	Technical (Brandy snaps)	Showstopper (Gingerbread 3D scene)
Ainslie	Linzer Cookies and Iced Orange and Cardamom Sugar Cookies	5th	Gingerbread Beach House
Eddie	Hot Chocolate Gingersnaps and Iced Brown Butter Spice Cookies	2nd	Grandma's Gingerbread House
Grace	Marble Butter Cookies and Iced Peppermint Candy Cookies	6th	Gingerbread Hospital
Lauren	Rugelach and Iced Tangerine-Chai Sugar Cookies	1st	Gingerbread Pagoda
Nicole	Iced Mint Chocolate Chip Santa Cookies and Christmas Breakfast Cookies	4th	Gingerbread Eiffel Tower
Tim	Czech Nut Cookies and Iced Sour Cream Sugar Cookies	3rd	Gingerbread Carousel

=== Episode 2: Cake ===
Festive holiday bakes continued in the tent as bakers had two hours to create a yule log sponge cake with a sweet filling of their choice. The technical bake was based on the recipe of Johnny Iuzzini's tiramisu cake with ladyfinger crisps. For the final showstopper bake, the bakers created a "Twelve Days of Christmas" fruitcake that revolved around one of the verses from the traditional Christmas carol.

Baker	Signature (Yule log)	Technical (Tiramisu)	Showstopper ("Twelve Days of Christmas" Fruitcake)
Ainslie	Coffee & Cream Yule Log	1st	Five Golden Rings Fruitcake
Eddie	German Chocolate Yule Log	5th	Two Turtle Doves Fruitcake
Lauren	Traditional Chocolate Yule Log	2nd	Three French Hens Fruitcake
Nicole	Pumpkin Spice Yule Log	3rd	Partridge in a Spiced Pear Tree Fruitcake
Tim	Rosemary Almond Yule Log	4th	Partridge in a Pear Tree Fruitcake

=== Episode 3: Pastry ===
In the semifinals, the bakers created two batches of breakfast pastries with any holiday flavor of their choosing. The technical tested the skills of the remaining bakers in Mary Berry's Christmas fruit tart. For the final pastry bake, the bakers created a centerpiece made from cream puffs and pastry pieces for a spot in the final three.

Baker	Signature (Breakfast pastries)	Technical (Fruit tart)	Showstopper (Pate a choux)
Ainslie	Apple Butter Pinwheels and Raspberry Chocolate Twists	1st	Butterscotch Cream Puff Stacked Present
Lauren	Pumpkin Maple Spice Pastries and Cranberry-Orange Pastries	3rd	Pâte À Choux Christmas Tree
Nicole	Pumpkin Pops and Honeyed Fig Tarts	4th	Pâte À Choux Reindeer
Tim	Cranberry-Orange Danish Puffs and Rohlicky	2nd	Chocolate Peppermint Reindeer Choux

=== Episode 4: Final ===
The final three begun with the signature bake, a holiday pie, to be baked under two-and-a-half hours. The pie also had to be accompanied with a delectable sauce on the side. In the technical, the bakers baked a candy cane-shaped bread with delicate icing and fruit. The final showstopper of the season lasted five hours, as bakers built up to make a three-dimensional presents cake.

Baker	Signature (Holiday pie)	Technical (Candy cane bread)	Showstopper (3D presents cake)
Lauren	Bourbon-Raisin Caramel Apple Pie with Salted Caramel Sauce	1st	Spumoni Surprise Cake
Nicole	Sweet Potato Pie with Pecan Praline Sauce	3rd	Nativity Surprise Cake
Tim	Apple-Cranberry Pie with Maple Custard Sauce	2nd	Holiday Lights Cake

== Ratings ==
Viewership and ratings per episode of The Great American Baking Show season 1
No.	Title	Air date	Rating/share (18–49)	Viewers (millions)	Ref.
1	"Cookie Week"	November 30, 2015	1.2/3	4.38	
2	"Cake Week"	December 7, 2015	0.9/3	3.72	
3	"Pastry Week"	December 14, 2015	0.9/3	3.33	
4	"Final Week"	December 21, 2015	1.1/4	4.46	
