= Paul Hollywood's Pies and Puds =

- Genre: Cookery
- Presented by: Paul Hollywood
- Composer: Dobs Vye
- Country of origin: United Kingdom
- Original language: English
- No. of series: 1
- No. of episodes: 20 (list of episodes)

Production
- Executive producers: Chris Kelly; Gerard Melling; Nick Bullen
- Producer: Dunk Barnes
- Editor: Bruce McKenna
- Running time: 45 minutes
- Production company: Spun Gold

Original release
- Network: BBC One; BBC One HD
- Release: 4 November – 29 November 2013

Related
- The Great British Bake Off

Paul Hollywood's Pies and Puds is a British cookery television series that was first broadcast on BBC One in November 2013. Each episode shows Paul Hollywood cooking three recipes. In addition to that, he goes around the United Kingdom looking for traditional local recipes and the stories behind them.

== Production ==
On 28 August 2013, Paul Hollywood appeared at the Chippenham Pit Stop café to film the fourteenth episode of the series. He cooked breakfast there, as well as pies made from ingredients used to serve breakfast.

On 30 August 2013, BBC Daytime announced that it had commissioned the twenty-part series. The series was commissioned by Gerard Melling. Damien Kavanagh, the head of BBC Daytime, said:

Paul is much loved by BBC audiences and his new series will be a real treat for Daytime viewers, providing them not only with a baking masterclass but also the fascinating stories behind some unique recipes. Sweet or savoury, the series will feature something for everyone.

In October 2013, Hollywood visited Botton for filming the sixth episode.

== Episode list ==
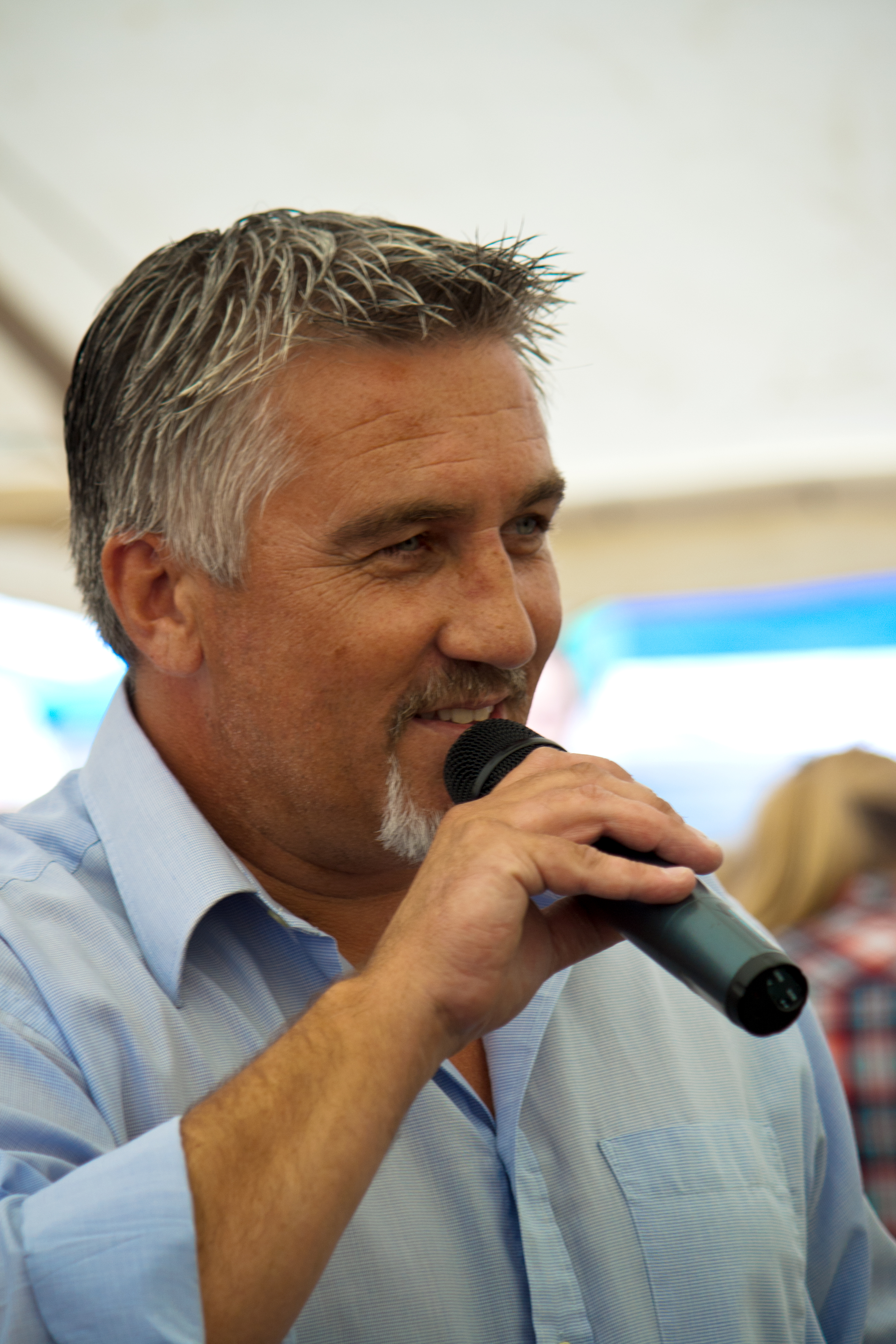
Paul Hollywood presented the series

No.	Title	Participant(s)	Original release date
1	"Episode 1"	Falko Burkert	4 November 2013
Recipes: Cobnut, pear and sticky toffee tart; gypsy tart; and corned beef plate pie.
2	"Episode 2"	Claire O'Connell	5 November 2013
Recipes: Toffee apple cake, deconstructed cream tea, and Hollywood's temptation.
3	"Episode 3"	Nigel Haworth	6 November 2013
Recipes: Meat and potato pie, scouse pie, and blueberry and buttermilk panna cotta.
4	"Episode 4"	Merle Moustafa	7 November 2013
Recipes: Pumpkin and ginger cheesecake, Thai chicken pie, and traditional rice pudding.
5	"Episode 5"	Stacey O'Gorman and Alex Hoffler	8 November 2013
Recipes: Individual fruit pies, queen of puddings, and luxury fish pie.
6	"Episode 6"	Lucia Stuart	11 November 2013
Recipes: Cheese, potato and onion pie; lemon and lavender loaf cake; chocolate and prune tart; and lemon and lavender posset with lavender biscuits.
7	"Episode 7"	Manju Mali	12 November 2013
Recipes: Shallot, onion and chive tart; salmon coulibiac; and chocolate and peppermint roulade.
8	"Episode 8"	Andrew Chisholm and Omar Allibhoy	13 November 2013
Recipes: Beetroot pie, scotch pies, and lardy cake crown.
9	"Episode 9"	The Marshmallowists	14 November 2013
Recipes: Coffee crème caramels; Sticky toffee pudding; salted caramel and coffee éclairs; and chicken and chorizo empanadas.
10	"Episode 10"	Tonia Buxton	15 November 2013
Recipes: Spinach, feta and pine nut parcels; Cumberland rum nicky; and raised pork and egg pie.
11	"Episode 11"	Tom Kerridge and Alex Langlands	18 November 2013
Recipes: Paul's mum's ginger biscuits, Paul's mum's jam tarts, chocolate orange pond pudding, and pork, apple and cider pie.
12	"Episode 12"	Outsider Tart	19 November 2013
Recipes: Lamb and kidney suet pudding with rosemary, buffalo and ale pie, and love cake.
13	"Episode 13"	Levi Roots	20 November 2013
Recipes: Banana tart tatin, apple and blackberry crumble, and savoury choux buns with creamy mushrooms.
14	"Episode 14"	Andrew Wong	21 November 2013
Recipes: Bacon and egg pie, Cheat's rough puff pastry and Yorkshire curd tart.
15	"Episode 15"	Rachel Allen	22 November 2013
Recipes: Brie brioche pie, goat-herd pie and cranachan cheesecake.
16	"Episode 16"	Glynn Purnell	25 November 2013
Recipes: Raised game pie, sausage rolls and Arctic roll.
17	"Episode 17"	Peggy Porschen	26 November 2013
Recipes: Chilli beef cornbread pies, marmalade and almond cake and strawberry mousse cake.
18	"Episode 18"	N/A	27 November 2013
Recipes: Black Forest trifle, steamed liquorice sponges and sausage plait.
19	"Episode 19"	Fiona Cairns	28 November 2013
Recipes: Curried cod pasties, pear and apricot frangipane tart and heather honey sponge.
20	"Episode 20"	Adam Cox	29 November 2013
Apple and Wensleydale pie and rabbit and pancetta pot pies.
