= The American Baking Competition =

- Genre: Baking; Reality
- Presented by: Jeff Foxworthy
- Judges: Marcela Valladolid; Paul Hollywood
- Country of origin: United States
- Original language: English
- No. of seasons: 1
- No. of episodes: 7

Production
- Executive producers: Jay Bienstock; Richard McKerrow
- Production company: Love Productions USA

Original release
- Network: CBS
- Release: May 29 – July 10, 2013

Related
- The Great British Bake Off; The Great American Baking Show (2015–)

The American Baking Competition is a reality competition television series that aired on CBS from May 29 to July 10, 2013. It was an adaptation of The Great British Bake Off (which aired in the United States under the title The Great British Baking Show). The series aimed to find the best amateur baker in the United States. The series was hosted by Jeff Foxworthy and judged by Marcela Valladolid and Paul Hollywood. The competition was won by Brian Emmett.

== Format ==
The show aimed to find among its contestants the best amateur baker in the US. Ten contestants were chosen for the first season. In each episode, the amateur bakers were given three challenges: a signature, a technical challenge, and a show-stopper. The three challenges took place over two days, and the dishes made by the contestants were assessed by the judges after each challenge. At the end of the three challenges, the judges chose a Star Baker for the week, and a contestant was also eliminated. In the finale three bakers were left and a winner was chosen from the three.

- Signature – a dish using their own tried and tested recipe that the amateur bakers make for their family and friends.
- Technical - a dessert using the same ingredients and recipe provided by the judges. The recipe given however has missing instructions and is designed to test the knowledge and skill of the bakers. The bakers are not told beforehand what the challenge might be, and the judges do not observe the bakers at work and judge the resulting dish without knowing who made them. This round is the only one where how each contestant performed is directly revealed. The contestants are given a ranking, but that ranking is not their total score for the episode.
- Show-stopper - a recipe designed to impress the judges.

The competition was held in one location in a specially constructed marquee. Interspersed in the show were short videos on the background of the contestants, as well as information on the history of baking and visiting various locations.

The entire season series was shot over a one-month period.

The winner of the competition received a $250,000 grand prize and a publishing contract with Simon & Schuster.

== Production ==
On October 17, 2012, CBS ordered the series under the original title Bake-Off. Since Pillsbury Company held the trademark to the name (using it for its Pillsbury Bake-Off), the show was later renamed The American Baking Competition.

CBS placed casting calls for participants on November 14, 2012. Auditions were held between December 1 and December 15, 2012. The competition took place at the Gibbs Gardens in Ball Ground, Georgia in March 2013.

== Broadcast ==
The first season of The American Baking Competition premiered on May 29, 2013. It aired four episodes in the Wednesdays at 8 p.m. Eastern/9 p.m. Central timeslot. On June 26, 2013, it moved to 9 p.m. Eastern/8 p.m. Central, to make way for Big Brother, and aired its three remaining episodes in that timeslot. Both of these timeslots put the series opposite Fox's MasterChef.

In 2015, ABC premiered a second U.S. version of the format, The Great Holiday Baking Show. The Christmas-themed revival ran for four episodes as part of ABC's December lineup, and featured Johnny Iuzzini joined by British judge Mary Berry. The series returned for a second season in 2016, renamed The Great American Baking Show.

== Bakers ==
Baker	Age (on show debut)	Occupation (on show)	Hometown	Notes
Brian Emmett	43	Marketing Executive	Itasca, Illinois	Originally from Glendale Heights, Illinois
Carlo Fuda	35	Social Marketing Consultant	Stamford, Connecticut	Originally from Ellwood City, Pennsylvania
Darlene Pawlukowsky	51	Project Manager	Johns Creek, Georgia	Originally from Mt. Prospect, Illinois
Effie Sahihi	40	Attorney	Hendersonville, Tennessee	Born in Israel and raised in Winter Haven, Florida
Elaine Francisco	63	Retired	Claremont, California	
Francine Bryson	44	Homemaker	Pickens, South Carolina	Born in Greenville, South Carolina and raised in Wakulla, Florida.
James Reddick	26	Photographer	Hollywood, California	Originally from Indianapolis, Indiana
Jeremy Cross	35	Firefighter	San Diego, California	
Kolette Biddle	30	Home Health Care Provider	Norco, California	
Whitney Beery	21	College Student	Lubbock, Texas	Originally from Castle Rock, Colorado

== Results summary ==
Elimination chart
Baker	1	2	3	4	5	6	7
Brian						SB	WINNER
Darlene				SB			Runner-Up
Francine	SB						Runner-Up
Elaine		SB				OUT	
James						OUT	
Effie					OUT		
Kolette				OUT			
Jeremy			OUT				
Whitney		OUT					
Carlo	OUT						

Color Key:

The baker got through to the next round.
The baker was the week's Star Baker.
The baker was one of the judges' favorite bakers that week, but did not win Star Baker.
The baker was one of the judges' least favorite bakers that week, but was not eliminated.
The baker was eliminated out of the competition.
The baker was the season runner-up.
The baker was the season winner.

== Episodes ==
=== Episode 1: "Pies & Tarts" ===
Episode one aired on May 29, 2013. The theme of the episode was sweet and savory pies and tarts.

For the signature bake, the bakers were given two hours to bake an American pie. On the technical bake, the bakers were required to bake a free-standing savory pie using Paul Hollywood's own recipe. The pie would be a hot water crust pastry and the bakers were given two hours. For the showstopper, the bakers needed to make 36 sweet tartlets within three hours.

Color key: Eliminated Star Baker Winner

Baker	Signature (The All American Pie)	Technical (Freestanding Savory Pie)	Showstopper (36 Sweet Tartlets)
Francine	Peanut Butter Bacon Pie	3rd	Chocolate Cherry Tartlets
Brian	Maple Bourbon Chocolate Pecan Pie	1st	Raspberry and Dark Chocolate Tartlets
Elaine	Peach Cobbler Pie	2nd	Lemon Ginger Tartlets
Effie	Apple, Quince, Rose pie	6th	Orange-Almond-Vanilla and Ricotta Tartlets
James	Mile High Apple Pie	8th	Ricotta and Greek Yogurt Honey Tartlets
Darlene	Sweet Potato Pie	9th	Blooming Apple Tartlets
Kolette	Chocolate Hazelnut Pie	5th	Goat Cheese and Cherry Tartlets
Whitney	Lemon Meringue Pie	7th	Rum Coconut Tartlets with Custard and Orange Zest
Jeremy	Sweet Potato Pie	4th	Kiwi, Mango and Blueberry Tartlets
Carlo	Ricotta Easter Pie	10th	Calabrese "Pite" Tartlets

=== Episode 2: "Cookies" ===
Episode two aired on June 5, 2013. The theme of the episode was all kinds of cookies.

The bakers were set the challenge of baking 12 cookies in an hour and a half using their own recipe, and all the cookies baked should be presented to the judges. For the technical challenge, the bakers were required to make in two hours 18 S'mores using Marcela's recipe. For the final showstopper, the bakers were given four hours to bake 40 sandwich Macarons. They must be of two different types, have a delicate crisp shell and soft chewy center.

Baker	Signature (Cookies)	Technical (S'mores)	Showstopper (40 Sandwich Macarons)
Elaine	Ginger Cookies	7th	Coconut Ganache and Lemon Buttercream Macarons
Jeremy	"Fat Pills"	5th	Strawberry and Chocolate Peanut Butter Macarons
Francine	"Slap-Yo-Mama" Chocolate Fudge Cookies	2nd	Drunken Orange and Raspberry Ganache Macarons
Effie	Rosemary Cherry Meyer Lemon Cookies	1st	Saffron Rose and Curry Coconut Lime Macarons
Darlene	Red Rose Crumbles	6th	Black Sesame and Chocolate Cinnamon Macarons
James	Brutti ma Buoni with Hazelnut Glaze	9th	Clementine and Earl Grey Macarons
Kolette	White Chocolate Macadamia Nut Cookies	3rd	Candied Ginger and Meyer Lemon Macarons
Brian	Cakey Chocolate Chip Cookies	8th	Coffee Cream and Mint Chocolate Macarons
Whitney	Soft Lemon Poppyseed Cookies	4th	Mocha and Chai Macarons

=== Episode 3: "Cakes" ===
Episode three aired on June 12, 2013. The theme of the episode was cake.

The bakers were set to make a One-Layer Cake in 90 minutes in the signature bake. In the technical challenge, they were given two hours and fifteen minutes to bake a Chiffon Cake with Tequila Orange Glaze using Marcela's recipe. For the showstopper, the challenge was to make a Surprise Inside Cake where, when sliced open, a surprise design is revealed. The bakers were given five hours for the challenge.

Baker	Signature (One-Layer Cake)	Technical (Chiffon Cake)	Showstopper (Surprise Inside Cake)
Elaine	Coconut Pineapple Upside-Down Cake	3rd	Valentine's Day Cake
Francine	Cherry Soda Pop Cake	1st	Floating Hearts Cake
Brian	Dark Chocolate Truffle Cake	5th	All-American Hamburger Surprise Cake
Darlene	Banana, Pineapple and Pecan Tiki-time Cake	4th	Give a Dog a Bone Cake
James	Coffee Cake	2nd	Underground Surprise Cake
Effie	Orange Cardamom Pistachio Cake	7th	I Love You to the Moon and Back Cake
Kolette	Oatmeal Spice Cake	8th	Check, Check, Check it out Cake
Jeremy	Cinnamon chocolate cake	6th	Single layer cherpumple cake

=== Episode 4: "Breads" ===
Episode four aired on June 19, 2013. The theme of the episode was bread and pastries.

For the signature bake, the bakers had three hours to make a free-form loaf of bread. The bread had to be yeast bread, and hand shaped. In the technical bake, the bakers were given one hour and 45 minutes to make eight large soft pretzels using Paul's recipe. Immediately following the technical challenge, the bakers went on to make the showstopper, which was two types of croissants, one plain and one filled. They were given two hours the first day, allowed the dough to rise overnight in the fridge, and then three hours the next day to finish the bake.

Baker	Signature (Loaf of Yeast Bread)	Technical (Soft Pretzels)	Showstopper ( 24 Croissants)
Darlene	Twist-and-turn Pesto Wheel	1st	Plain and Apricot and Pecan-Filled Croissants
Brian	Onion-Braided Loaf	3rd	Plain and Ham-and-Chive-Filled Croissants
Francine	Red Hot, Pecan, and Brown Sugar Loaf	2nd	Plain and Date, Nut and Honey-Filled Croissants
James	Prosciutto, Capicola, and Pepperoni Loaf	7th	Plain and Chocolate-Filled Croissants
Elaine	Old-Fashioned Potato Loaf	4th	Plain and Raspberry and White Chocolate-Filled Croissants
Effie	Enriched Challah Bread	6th	Plain and Pear-Filled Croissants
Kolette	German Pumpernickel	5th	Plain and Almond-Filled Croissants

=== Episode 5: "Desserts" ===
Episode five aired on June 26, 2013. The theme of the episode was sweet baked goods.

For the signature bake, the bakers must make 8 individual custards, either sweet like a crème brûlée, or using a more savory recipe. They had 90 minutes to finish the task. In the technical bake, the challenge was to bake a chocolate soufflé, however. As the soufflé can fall within minutes of coming out of the oven, the start time for the bakers was staggered so that each bake can be judged immediately after it was baked. The bakers were each given an hour and 45 minutes. For the final challenge, the bakers were required to produce a layered dessert featuring meringue in five hours.

Baker	Signature (8 Custards)	Technical (Chocolate Soufflé)	Showstopper (Multi-layer Meringue Cakes)
Darlene	Vanilla Custards	3rd	Chocolate Meringue Cake
Francine	Dreamsicle Custards	4th	Raspberry, Lemon and Meringue Chiffon Cake
Elaine	Crab and Fresh Corn Custards	2nd	Nutty Meringue Stack
James	Caramel Espresso Custards	1st	Pavlova and Lemon Layer Cake with Berries
Brian	Jalapeño and Chorizo Custards	6th	Almond Meringue Cake
Effie	Lime Pots de Creme	5th	Hazelnut Meringue Creation

=== Episode 6: "Patisserie" ===
Episode six aired on July 3, 2013. It was the semi-finals of the competition. The theme of the episode was French pastries, often called patisserie.

The tarte tatin was the signature bake. The contestants were required to complete it in two hours and fifteen minutes. For the technical bake, the bakers were required to make 4 Napoleons, using Paul Hollywood's own recipe, in two and a half hours. For the showstopper, the contestants had to make a choux tower in four and a half hours.

Baker	Signature (Tarte tatin)	Technical (4 Napoleons)	Showstopper (Choux tower)
Brian	French Onion Tarte Tatin	1st	Chocolate Mousse Choux Tower
Darlene	Apple, Pear, Cranberry Tarte Tatin	3rd	Orange and Grand Marnier Cream Choux Tower
Francine	Peach Tarte Tatin	2nd	Vanilla Cream Choux Tower
Elaine	Bartlett Pear Tarte Tatin	4th	Chocolate Espresso Cream Choux Tower
James	Asian Pear Tarte Tatin	5th	Chocolate and Orange Liqueur Cream Choux Tower

=== Episode 7: "Finale" ===
Episode seven aired on July 10, 2013. It was the finals of the competition. The theme was patriotism, with dishes that were all related to the United States.

The contestants could make anything for the signature bake but had to include the official state crop of Georgia, the peanut; they had a time limit of two hours thirty minutes. The contestants had two hours forty-five minutes to complete a Paul Hollywood recipe; a dozen Boston Cream Donuts. For the showstopper the final three contestants had five hours to make 72 miniature desserts inspired by the American flag; 24 mini-meringues, 24 mini-tarts and 24 mini-cakes.

Baker	Signature (Peanuts)	Technical (Dozen Boston Cream Donuts)	Showstopper (72 miniature desserts)
Brian	Vanilla Peanut Chiffon Roll with a Peanut Mousse Filling, topped with Peanut Praline	3rd	Whipped Cream filled Mini-Meringues with White Chocolate dipped Popcorn; Mascarpone Cream filled Mini-Tarts with berries Raspberry White Chocolate Mini-Cakes with berries
Darlene	Peanut Cake Roll with Peanut Cream Filling	1st	4 July Mini-Meringues with Pop Rocks Candy; Peach and Grit Mini-Tarts; Strawberry USA Mini-Cakes
Francine	Spiced Peanut Peanut Butter Torte with a Cream Cheese; Filling and a Cookie Crumble Shell	2nd	Blueberry Cream-Filled Mini-Meringues; Red, White and Blue Mini-Cakes covered in White Chocolate; Peaches and Cream Creampuffs pastries

== Reception ==
=== Critical reception ===
The American Baking Competition has received mixed reviews from critics.

Liane Bonin Starr of HitFix stated that the series was "surprisingly nice" for a reality TV series. She felt that it was very mellow, so "it was up to judges Marcela Valladolid and Paul Hollywood to provide some acid to the recipe." She did appreciate the series's showcasing of the food, saying "what the show lacks in intensity it makes up for in food."

TV Line's Michael Slezak described the series as "half-baked" stating that there was "not really enough time to focus on getting to know the players" or to get "a real insight into their baking philosophies." Additionally, the pilot's outcome was described as "as predictable as the use of butter in a pie crust." He expressed hope that "future installments might take a few tips from various Food Network competition shows and put a little more emphasis on the actual dishes."

=== Ratings ===
The series premiered to a disappointing 1.0 rating in the Adults 18-49 demographic and 5.11 million total viewers. This made it the worst ever Wednesday premiere for a CBS show. However, it rose in ratings for the first two weeks, a feat ratings experts called "extremely rare." It had seemed like the series would be boosted by moving behind Big Brother on June 26, but it didn't end up that way, as the ratings were generally the same after the move. The last two episodes did not help the series, as it went down slightly, a movement that was not good for the series's renewal prospects. The show was cancelled in July 2013.

Episode list
No.	Air date	Rating / share Households	Rating / share 18–49	Viewers (millions)	Weekly ranking		Refs
No.	Air date	Rating / share Households	Rating / share 18–49	Viewers (millions)	18–49	Total viewers	Refs
1	May 29, 2013	3.4 / 6	1.0 / 3	5.11	41	27	
2	June 5, 2013	3.1 / 6	1.1 / 4	4.73	>25	29	
3	June 12, 2013	3.9 / 7	1.2 / 4	5.68	24	22	
4	June 19, 2013	3.7 / 7	1.2 / 4	5.80	23	14	
5	June 26, 2013	3.3 / 5	1.2 / 4	5.10	23	>25	
6	July 3, 2013		1.1 / 4	4.70	23	19	
7	July 10, 2013	3.1 / 5	1.1 / 3	4.83	>25	25	
