= The Great American Baking Show =

- Genre: Baking; Reality
- Created by: Richard McKerrow; Anna Beattie
- Directed by: Andy Devonshire; Jeanette Goulbourn
- Presented by: Nia Vardalos; Ian Gomez; Ayesha Curry; Anthony Adams; Emma Bunton; Ellie Kemper; Zach Cherry; Casey Wilson; Andrew Rannells
- Judges: Mary Berry; Johnny Iuzzini; Paul Hollywood; Sherry Yard; Prue Leith
- Theme music composer: Tom Howe
- Country of origin: United States
- Original language: English
- No. of seasons: 9
- No. of episodes: 59 (4 unaired)

Production
- Executive producers: Richard McKerrow; Kevin Bartel; Simon Evans; Faye Stapleton; Al Edgington; Joe LaBracio; Jeremy Finn; John Hesling; Nicholas Berry
- Producer: Ellie Kemper
- Production locations: Heatherden Hall, Pinewood Studios
- Running time: 60 minutes
- Production company: Love Productions USA

Original release
- Network: ABC (2015–2020); The Roku Channel (2022–2026)
- Release: November 30, 2015 – May 10, 2026

Related
- The Great British Bake Off; The American Baking Competition

The Great American Baking Show is an American cooking competition television series and an adaptation of The Great British Bake Off (which is aired in the United States under the title The Great British Baking Show). Its first season aired on ABC under the title The Great Holiday Baking Show. The show is the second licensed adaptation of the GBBO format in the United States. In 2013, CBS produced one season of The American Baking Competition, which was hosted by Jeff Foxworthy, with Paul Hollywood and Mexican-American chef Marcela Valladolid as judges.

The first two seasons were hosted by Nia Vardalos and Ian Gomez, with Mary Berry from the original GBBO series and American pastry chef Johnny Iuzzini as judges. The third season was hosted by cookbook author Ayesha Curry and former football player Anthony Adams. Iuzzini returned as judge and was joined by original GBBO judge Paul Hollywood. The season was pulled off the schedule following sexual harassment allegations against judge Iuzzini, who was officially fired from the show and ABC. Curry and Iuzzini did not return for the fourth season.

On May 4, 2018, the show was renewed for a fourth season, which aired on December 6, 2018. Emma Bunton and Sherry Yard were hired as replacement host and judge, respectively. On August 1, 2019, the show was renewed for a fifth season, which premiered on December 12, 2019.

On May 3, 2022, it was announced that The Roku Channel would be airing a sixth season of the show, with Paul Hollywood returning as judge, along with Prue Leith from GBBO. Roku also announced plans to air The Great American Baking Show: Celebrity Holiday, featuring celebrities competing to raise money for charity. All six episodes of the sixth season of the show premiered on May 5, 2023. The Roku Channel ordered a seventh season of the series, which premiered on May 24, 2024. The eighth season premiered on April 11, 2025. The Roku Channel ordered a ninth season of this series, along with a fourth installment of Celebrity Holiday Special and second installment of Big Game and Celebrity Summer; the ninth season premiered on May 10, 2026.

== Hosts and judges ==
Current
Hosts/Judges	Season								
Hosts/Judges	1	2	3	4	5	6	7	8	9
Casey Wilson							Host		
Andrew Rannells									Host
Paul Hollywood			Judge						
Prue Leith						Judge			

Former
Hosts/Judges	Season							
Hosts/Judges	1	2	3	4	5	6	7	8
Nia Vardalos	Host							
Ian Gomez	Host							
Ayesha Curry			Host					
Anthony Adams			Host					
Emma Bunton				Host				
Ellie Kemper						Host		
Zach Cherry						Host		
Mary Berry	Judge							
Johnny Iuzzini	Judge							
Sherry Yard				Judge				

== Season overview ==
Season	Episodes	Premiere	Finale	Winner	Runner(s)-up	Average viewers (millions)
1	4	November 30, 2015	December 21, 2015	Lauren Katz	Nicole Silva	3.97
1	4	November 30, 2015	December 21, 2015	Lauren Katz	Tim Samson	3.97
2	8	December 1, 2016	January 12, 2017	Amanda Faber	Stephanie Chen	4.39
3	2 (4 unaired)	December 7, 2017	N/A	Vallery Lomas	Cindy Maliniak	3.84
3	2 (4 unaired)	December 7, 2017	N/A	Vallery Lomas	Molly Brodak	3.84
4	6	December 6, 2018	December 20, 2018	Tina Zaccardi	Amanda Nguyen	3.44
4	6	December 6, 2018	December 20, 2018	Tina Zaccardi	Andrea Maranville	3.44
5	8	December 12, 2019	January 2, 2020	Br. Andrew Corriente, OFM Cap.	Dana Commandatore	
5	8	December 12, 2019	January 2, 2020	Br. Andrew Corriente, OFM Cap.	Marissa Troeschel	
6	6	May 5, 2023	May 5, 2023	Martin Sorge	Dyana O'Brien	
6	6	May 5, 2023	May 5, 2023	Martin Sorge	Sarah Chang	
7	6	May 24, 2024	May 24, 2024	Mackenzie Rubish	Ronald "RJ" Winter	
7	6	May 24, 2024	May 24, 2024	Mackenzie Rubish	Nicole Aufderhar	
8	6	April 11, 2025	April 11, 2025	Kim Goldfeder Clarke	Daniel Freiburger	
8	6	April 11, 2025	April 11, 2025	Kim Goldfeder Clarke	Adela Mou	
9	5	May 10, 2026	May 10, 2026	Ruiqi Chen	Melissa Curmi	
9	5	May 10, 2026	May 10, 2026	Ruiqi Chen	Meeki Lad	

=== Season 1 (2015) ===
Season 1 aired under the title The Great Holiday Baking Show and marked a return of the GBBO format to American television after the cancellation of the series by CBS in late 2013 after one season when it originally aired under the title The American Baking Competition. Six bakers participated in the first ABC season. The season was won by Lauren Katz, beating out Nicole Silva and Tim Samson in the finale.

=== Season 2 (2016–17) ===
Season 2 returned the following year as The Great American Baking Show with ten bakers and an eight-week competition. The season was won by Amanda Faber, with Stephanie Chen as the runner-up.

=== Season 3 (2017) ===
The third season began airing December 7, 2017, with a two-hour premiere. It is the first season hosted by Ayesha Curry and Anthony Adams and for judge Paul Hollywood who last appeared on the 2013 CBS version of the show. This season, baker Antoinette Love, who withdrew following a family death, returned to the competition. The season was withdrawn from ABC's schedule on December 13, 2017, following allegations of sexual misconduct by judge Johnny Iuzzini. ABC announced that it would not air the remaining episodes. On December 21, 2017, the day the season finale would have been broadcast, ABC announced that Vallery Lomas won the competition with Cindy Maliniak and Molly Brodak finishing as runners-up.

=== Season 4 (2018) ===
The fourth season premiered December 6, 2018, under the title The Great American Baking Show: Holiday Edition. Anthony Adams returned for his second season as host, with former Spice Girls singer Emma Bunton as new host. Joining Paul Hollywood on the judging panel is American pastry chef and restaurateur, Sherry Yard. The season was won by Tina Zaccardi. Amanda Nguyen and Andrea Maranville finished as runners-up.

=== Season 5 (2019) ===
The fifth season premiered December 12, 2019, with hosts Emma Bunton and Anthony Adams and judges Paul Hollywood and Sherry Yard, returning for the second Holiday Edition.

The contestants entering the tent are Dana Commandatore, Sarita Gelner, Bianca Jackson, Carlos Marquina, Sally Newton, Tanya Clark Ott, Helen Spencer Pantazis, Marissa Troeschel, Alex Willis, and Friar, Brother Andrew. The season was won by Brother Andrew. Dana Commandatore and Marissa Troeschel finished as runners-up.

=== Celebrity Holiday (2022) ===
Star Baker

Signature Challenge	Technical Challenge	Showstopper Challenge	Contestants	Airdate
8 Cream Puff Holiday Characters	Meringue Holiday Wreath	Favorite Holiday Memory Cake	D'Arcy Carden	December 2, 2022
8 Cream Puff Holiday Characters	Meringue Holiday Wreath	Favorite Holiday Memory Cake	Liza Koshy	December 2, 2022
8 Cream Puff Holiday Characters	Meringue Holiday Wreath	Favorite Holiday Memory Cake	Marshawn Lynch	December 2, 2022
8 Cream Puff Holiday Characters	Meringue Holiday Wreath	Favorite Holiday Memory Cake	Nat Faxon	December 2, 2022
8 Cream Puff Holiday Characters	Meringue Holiday Wreath	Favorite Holiday Memory Cake	Chloe Fineman	December 2, 2022
8 Cream Puff Holiday Characters	Meringue Holiday Wreath	Favorite Holiday Memory Cake	Joel Kim Booster	December 2, 2022

=== Season 6 (2023) ===
The sixth season of the show premiered on The Roku Channel on May 5, 2023, with judges Paul Hollywood and Prue Leith joined by hosts Ellie Kemper and Zach Cherry. The nine contestants entering the tent are Martin Sorge, Nirali Chauhan, Stacie Nakamoto, Dyana O'Brien, Susan Simpson, Karis Stucker, Jonathan Gottfried, Sarah Chang and Sean Liu.

=== Celebrity Holiday (2023) ===
The second installment of The Great American Baking Show: Celebrity Holiday premiered on The Roku Channel on November 10, 2023, with judges Paul Hollywood and Prue Leith joined by hosts Casey Wilson and Zach Cherry.
Star Baker

Signature Challenge	Technical Challenge	Showstopper Challenge	Contestants	Airdate
12 Christmas Memory Sandwich cookies	Sufganiyah	Favorite Childhood Toy Cake	Arturo Castro	November 10, 2023
12 Christmas Memory Sandwich cookies	Sufganiyah	Favorite Childhood Toy Cake	DeAndre Jordan	November 10, 2023
12 Christmas Memory Sandwich cookies	Sufganiyah	Favorite Childhood Toy Cake	Joel McHale	November 10, 2023
12 Christmas Memory Sandwich cookies	Sufganiyah	Favorite Childhood Toy Cake	Heather McMahan	November 10, 2023
12 Christmas Memory Sandwich cookies	Sufganiyah	Favorite Childhood Toy Cake	Ego Nwodim	November 10, 2023
12 Christmas Memory Sandwich cookies	Sufganiyah	Favorite Childhood Toy Cake	Phoebe Robinson	November 10, 2023

=== Season 7 (2024) ===
The seventh season of the show premiered on The Roku Channel on May 24, 2024, with judges Paul Hollywood and Prue Leith joined by hosts Casey Wilson and Zach Cherry. The eight contestants entering the tent are Chris Curcuru, Brad Gessner, Mackenzie Rubish, Ronald "RJ" Winter, Nicole Aufderhar, Ruoyun Zheng, Victoria Walters, and Jennifer Reyes.

=== Celebrity Holiday (2024) ===
The third installment of The Great American Baking Show: Celebrity Holiday premiered on The Roku Channel on November 21, 2024, with judges Paul Hollywood and Prue Leith joined by hosts Casey Wilson and Zach Cherry. The contestants were Anthony Anderson, Rob Riggle, Vanessa Bayer, Loni Love, and Susie Essman.

=== Celebrity Big Game (2025) ===
The Great American Baking Show: Celebrity Big Game premiered on The Roku Channel on February 3, 2025, with judges Paul Hollywood and Prue Leith joined by hosts Casey Wilson and Zach Cherry. The contestants were DK Metcalf, Amy Smart, Arik Armstead, Katie Nolan, and Tony Gonzalez.

=== Season 8 (2025) ===
The eighth season of the show premiered on The Roku Channel on April 11, 2025, with judges Paul Hollywood and Prue Leith joined by hosts Casey Wilson and Zach Cherry. The eight contestants entering the tent are Parwana Ashari, Kim Goldfelder Clarke, Alma Dhuyvetter, Daniel Freiburger, Pablo Hurtado, Adela Mou, Chris Stefanski, and Elisa Veal.

=== Celebrity Summer (2025) ===
The Great American Baking Show: Celebrity Summer premiered on The Roku Channel on August 16, 2025, with judges Paul Hollywood and Prue Leith joined by hosts Casey Wilson and Zach Cherry. The contestants were Jesse Tyler Ferguson, Yara Shahidi, June Diane Raphael, and Andrew Rannells.

=== Celebrity Halloween (2025) ===
The first installment of The Great American Baking Show: Celebrity Halloween premiered on The Roku Channel on October 2, 2025, with judges Paul Hollywood and Prue Leith joined by hosts Casey Wilson and Andrew Rannells. The contestants were Patton Oswalt, Rachel Dratch, Leslie Jones, and Adam Pally.

=== Celebrity Holiday (2025) ===
The fourth installment of The Great American Baking Show: Celebrity Holiday premiered on The Roku Channel on November 3, 2025, with judges Paul Hollywood and Prue Leith joined by hosts Casey Wilson and Andrew Rannells. The contestants were Baron Davis, Cheri Oteri, Oliver Hudson, and Janelle James.

=== Celebrity Big Game (2026) ===
The second installment of The Great American Baking Show: Celebrity Big Game premiered on The Roku Channel on February 1, 2026, with judges Paul Hollywood and Prue Leith joined by hosts Casey Wilson and Andrew Rannells. The contestants were Antonio Gates, Von Miller, Julian Edelman, and Mina Kimes.

=== Season 9 (2026) ===
The ninth season of the show premiered on The Roku Channel on May 10, 2026, with judges Paul Hollywood and Prue Leith joined by hosts Casey Wilson and Andrew Rannells. The eight contestants entering the tent are Adam Greathouse, Lisa Sanders, Meeki Lad, Melissa Curmi, Rebecca “Becca” Cary, Ruiqi Chen, Scott Oscher, and Susan “Sue” Taylor.
