= The Mosslands School =

Comprehensive school in Wallasey, Wirral, UK

Location
- Mosslands Drive; Wallasey, Merseyside, CH45 8PJ; England; 53.4187°N 3.0665°W

Information
- Type: Community school
- Motto: Latin: Per Scientiam Ad Meliora (Through Knowledge to Better Things)
- Established: 1956
- Local authority: Wirral
- Specialist: Technology
- Department for Education URN: 105103 Tables
- Head teacher: Adrian Whiteley
- Gender: Boys
- Age: 11 to 18
- Enrolment: 1097 (2020)
- Capacity: 1573
- Houses: 3 (Grenfell, Faraday, Ruskin)
- Colours: Red, Yellow, Green
- Website: www.mosslands.co.uk

The Mosslands School is a comprehensive, community school for boys aged 11–18. It is situated in Wallasey Village, Wirral, England. It is a STEAM Centre of Excellence and became a specialist Technology College in 2004.

The school has 1097 pupils. The school is rare in that it is a single-sex comprehensive school. Whilst Mosslands is a boys school, it accepts girls in the sixth form. Ofsted rated the school as Good in 2016.

== History ==
The Mosslands School began on 18 July 1908 as the Higher Elementary School. The school building, located at Dalmorton Road, New Brighton, was officially opened by The Right Hon. Augustine Birrell KC (Secretary of State for Ireland and formerly Education). The school opened on 11 August 1908 with 7 staff and 153 boys with William Jones as Principal. The first school inspection took place in 1910 and the recommendation was made for larger premises to accommodate the growth of the local population.

In 1920 the school moved to Coronation Avenue, Wallasey, and was renamed Wallasey Boys Central School. It was one of the few Technical Schools established after the Education Act 1944.

In 1956 a purpose-built school was built at Mosslands Drive, Wallasey Village. The building, plate glass in construction, was opened by glass mogul Sir Harry Pilkington. The first headmaster was Mr K. Williams who introduced three houses: Grenfell (red), Faraday (yellow), and Ruskin (green). The school was renamed the Secondary Technical School for Boys.

By 1959 the school population was around 500 with 20 members of staff. The school was established as the only Technical Grammar School in the country, and in 1961 J D Petit became headmaster.

The school took on the Middle School system and changed its name for the fourth time to Mosslands Senior Comprehensive. New headmaster William Mitchell later reorganised the school to 11 to 18 and it became known as The Mosslands School.

The school occupied two sites (Mosslands Drive and a lower school annexe for years 7 and 8) with a population of 1250 boys, a mixed sixth form and over 100 members of staff. Headmaster Gordon Fair took the school to a single site and a rebuild took place, equipping the school with science laboratories, art studios, music suites, computer rooms, sports hall, and a library.

In 2004 The Mosslands School became a specialist Technology College.

== Notable old boys ==
- Shaun Garnett, footballer for Tranmere Rovers and Oldham Athletic
- Paul Hollywood, baker and television chef known for The Great British Bake Off
- Jason Koumas, footballer for Wigan Athletic, Wales
- Nigel Lythgoe, television and film director who produced Pop Idol and American Idol
- Derek Mountfield, footballer for Aston Villa and Everton
- Simon Rimmer, television chef who co-presented BBC2's Something for the Weekend
- Matthew Smith (games programmer), creator of the 8-bit platform games Manic Miner and Jet Set Willy
- Jay Spearing, footballer for Tranmere Rovers
