= Cumberland rum nicky =

English pastry

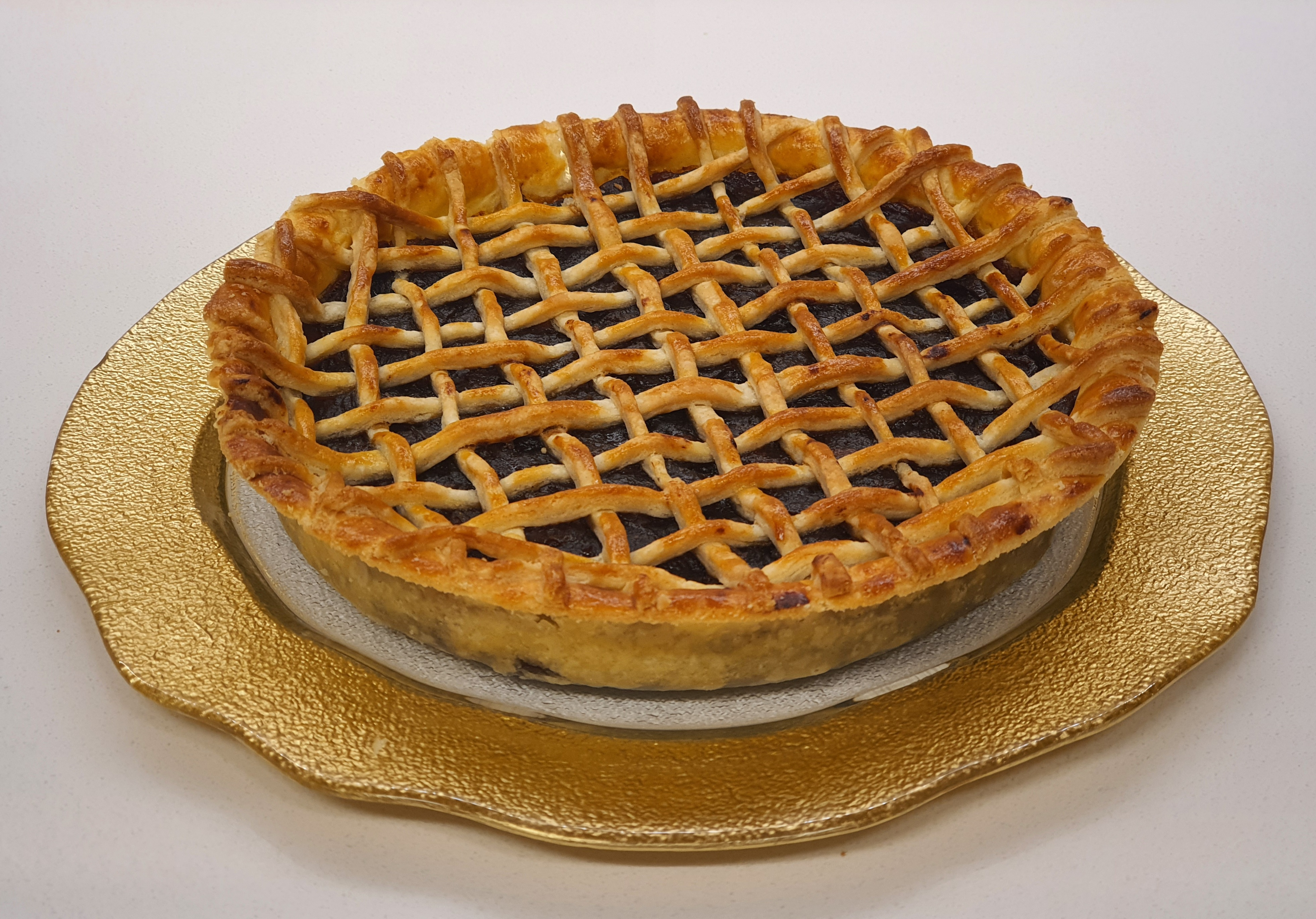
- A homemade Cumberland rum nicky tart
- Type: Pie or tart
- Course: Dessert or snack
- Place of origin: United Kingdom
- Region or state: Cumbria
- Associated cuisine: England
- Created by: Traditional
- Invented: 19th century
- Main ingredients: Shortcrust pastry; Dates; Ginger; Rum

Cumberland rum nicky is a sweet shortcrust pastry tart or pie, commonly filled with dates and stem ginger, flavoured with rum, and sweetened with brown sugar. Rum nickies are associated with the historic county of Cumberland (now part of Cumbria) in northwest England, and the ingredients used in their manufacture reflect the county's former significance as a major import and trading centre for products of the UK's Caribbean colonies. As with many traditional foodstuffs, the precise list of ingredients can vary between different cooks and recipes, with currants and cinnamon being common additions or substitutions.

== History ==
Originally founded as local trading and fishing ports, the ports of northwest England grew in national significance during the 17th and 18th centuries, following the founding of agricultural plantation colonies in the Caribbean. This placed towns such as Lancaster, Workington and, particularly, Whitehaven in Cumberland at the European corner of the Triangular Trade, wherein cloth and other trade goods were shipped from England down to West Africa, swapped for slaves who were shipped to the Caribbean, and then the products of that slave labour were brought back to England. This trade was highly lucrative, and between 1750 and 1800 Whitehaven was the third-largest port in England.

Significant amongst the products imported through Whitehaven were foodstuffs: spices like ginger, dried tropical fruits, unrefined sugar, and other products made from sugarcane juice, including rum. This local trade, augmented by smuggling, meant that these products, considered exotic and scarce elsewhere in the UK, were relatively available and affordable in Cumberland. As a consequence, much of Cumberland's traditional local fare that dates from this period includes sugar, rum, dried fruit, and spices as major ingredients. Dishes such as rum butter, hiring fair cakes and Hawkshead cake remain relatively uncommon outside the northwest of England, while more widespread delicacies such as gingerbread have many local varieties.

The precise origin of the rum nicky recipe is not known, but food journalist Andrew Webb states that it was "created at the high-water mark of the region's trade in the 1800s", and it includes many of these ingredients that were unknown in the region before the start of the Caribbean trade. Older recipes indicate that the pastry and filling were originally formed into individual pies, and the tops of each were slashed or 'nicked' with a knife, this latter action likely being the origin of the dish's name.

== Description and ingredients ==
The modern Cumberland rum nicky is commonly presented as a large, open-topped tart, designed to be sliced into individual portions before serving. The tart shell is formed from shortcrust pastry, which is used to line a shallow, 3–5 cm deep, flan tin.

The tart filling can vary between different regions and different cooks, but usually includes a large quantity of dried fruit, bound together with a mixture of rum, brown sugar and butter. Dates are the most common dried fruit used for a rum nicky, but it is not unusual for other fruits such as currants or cherries to be substituted for some or all of the dates. Some cooks, particularly in the south of Cumbria, may bind the fruit together with a cake mixture rather than simply butter and sugar. Additional flavourings added to the fruit filling mixture are dominated by ginger – usually candied ginger root termed 'stem ginger', diced finely rather than grated – but may also include additional spices such as cinnamon or nutmeg.

Most commonly, the tart is decorated with an interwoven open lattice of pastry strips, with the filling visible between them. However, the ingredients can alternatively be formed into individual pies, fully enclosed by pastry in a similar manner to other fruit-filled pastries from northwest England, such as Eccles cakes or Chorley cakes. These individual pastries are then slashed or 'nicked' on their upper surface using a knife, to form parallel slashes or a hash (#) pattern. The larger tart portions are commonly served with cream, clotted cream, ice cream, or another similar sauce.
