= Sherry Yard =

American chef

- Born: January 11, 1964 (age 62); Gerritsen Beach, Brooklyn, New York, US
- Education: New York City College of Technology; The Culinary Institute of America
- Spouse: Edward M. Ines (m. 2008)
- Culinary career
- Current restaurants
- City Perch Kitchen + Bar (Bethesda, MD; Fort Lee, NJ); The Tuck Room (Los Angeles, California; New York City; North Miami Beach, FL; Houston, TX)
- Television shows
- Tournament of Champions (TV series): All-Star Christmas; The Great American Baking Show: Holiday Edition; Cake Wars: Christmas; Halloween Baking Championship; Cutthroat Kitchen: Superstar Sabotage; Food Network Star; Sugar Showdown; Top Chef: Just Desserts; Duff Till Dawn; Iron Chef America
- Awards
- 2002 James Beard Foundation Award, Outstanding Pastry Chef of the Year; 2004 James Beard Foundation Award, Best Baking Cookbook; 2014 James Beard Foundation Award, Who's Who of Food and Beverage in America

Sherry Yard (born January 11, 1964) is an American chef, restaurateur and cookbook author.

== Career ==
Yard has served as a chef in several Wolfgang Puck restaurants, including Spago, Rainbow Room and Tribeca Grill. She also served as chief operating officer, Restaurant Division at iPic Entertainment, a national entertainment group known for their upscale movie theaters, in-cinema dining, and restaurants. She officially stepped down from iPic in July 2019.

Yard has stated that her signature dessert is Kaiserschmarrn.

=== Television ===
Yard has served as a judge on several cooking shows, including the Food Network series Halloween Baking Championship, Cake Wars Christmas, Christmas Cookie Challenge, Cooking Channel television series Sugar Showdown and more recently on ABC's The Great American Baking Show. She has been a guest judge on Top Chef: Just Desserts, Food Network Star, Duff Till Dawn, Iron Chef America and Cutthroat Kitchen. She has also competed in the Food Network show, Cutthroat Kitchen: Superstar Sabotage.

== Personal life ==
On May 3, 2008, Yard married dentist Edward M. Ines in Malibu, California in a destination wedding hosted by Wolfgang Puck, whom Yard served under as the corporate executive pastry chef at the time. They live in Manhattan Beach, California.

== Bibliography ==
Year	Title	Publisher	ISBN
2003	The Secrets of Baking: Simple Techniques for Sophisticated Desserts	Houghton Mifflin Harcourt	0618138927
2007	Desserts by the Yard: From Brooklyn to Beverly Hills: Recipes from the Sweetest Life Ever	Houghton Mifflin Harcourt	0618515224

== Awards and nominations ==
Year	Ceremony	Category	Work	Result
2000	Bon Appetit American Food & Entertaining Awards	Pastry Chef of the Year	Spago, Beverly Hills	Won
2002	James; Beard	Outstanding Pastry Chef of the Year	Spago, Beverly Hills	Won
2004	James; Beard	Best Baking Cookbook	The Secrets of Baking: Simple Techniques for Sophisticated Desserts	Won
2006	Pastry Art & Design	Top 10 Pastry Chefs in America	Spago, Beverly Hills	Won
2007	Food Arts	Silver Spoon Award	Spago, Beverly Hills	Won
2010	Women Chefs and Restaurateurs Women Who Inspire Awards	Golden Bowl Award	Spago, Beverly Hills	Won
2014	James; Beard	Who's Who of Food and Beverage in America	—N/a	Won
