= Ian Gomez =

American actor (born 1964)

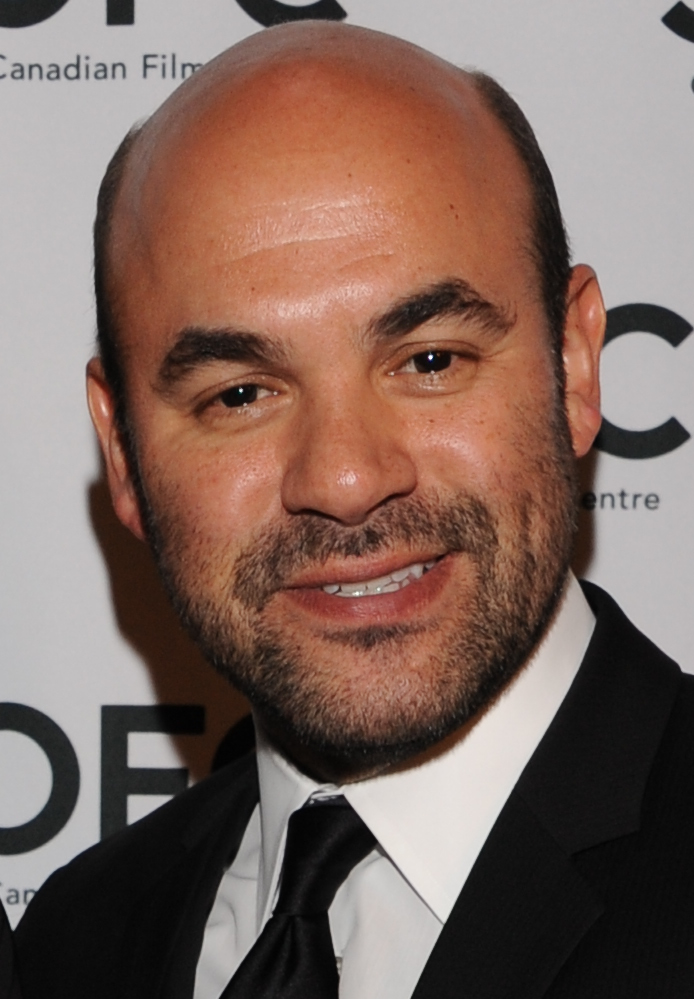
- Gomez in 2012
- Born: December 27, 1964 (age 61); New York City, U.S.
- Occupation: Actor
- Years active: 1993–present
- Spouse: Nia Vardalos (m. 1993; div. 2018)
- Children: 1

Ian Braque Gomez (born December 27, 1964) is an American actor known for his comedic TV work, which includes series-regular roles as Javier on Felicity and Andy on Cougar Town.

== Early life ==
He was born in New York City to a dancer mother of Ashkenazi Jewish descent and an artist father of Puerto Rican descent.

== Improvisational theatre and sketch comedy ==
Before his television career, Gomez studied acting and improvisation with Bill Anderson in New York. He moved to Chicago in the early 1990s, working in The Second City's box office while performing at ImprovOlympic. In 1991, he joined Second City Northwest's resident stage, where he worked with Stephen Colbert and Nia Vardalos. Gomez and Vardalos also appeared in the 1993 Second City e.t.c. revue Cardinal Knowledge or Felonious Monks.

At Second City, Gomez developed a sketch character named Enrique, which he later adapted into Javier on Felicity. In 1999, he appeared with Wayne Brady, Brad Sherwood and Denny Siegel in a Whose Line Is It Anyway? show at Austin Music Hall during the fourth Big Stinkin' International Improv & Sketch Comedy Festival.

== Career ==
On The Drew Carey Show from 1995 to 2004, Gomez played Larry Almada, a co-worker of Drew Carey's character (also named Drew Carey) at Winfred-Louder. He also worked with Carey in 1999 on the show Whose Line Is It Anyway? From 1998 to 2002, he played Javier Clemente Quintata on the WB show Felicity.

In 1999, Gomez joined the cast of the ABC sitcom Norm as Danny Sanchez, one of the main characters; he remained on the show for all three seasons until its cancellation in 2001. In 2002, Gomez starred in Alanis Morissette's "Hands Clean" music video. In the same year, he appeared with Jeff Garlin, Ted Danson, Michael York, and Hugh Mellon in two episodes of the HBO series Curb Your Enthusiasm, where he played the "bald chef", hired by Larry to cook in the restaurant he owned.

Gomez appeared in ABC's Jake in Progress (2005–2006), which starred John Stamos. 2006 saw Gomez appear in the fourth episode of Lost's third season, "Every Man for Himself", and as a therapist in the April 2006 episode "Here We Go Again" of Reba.

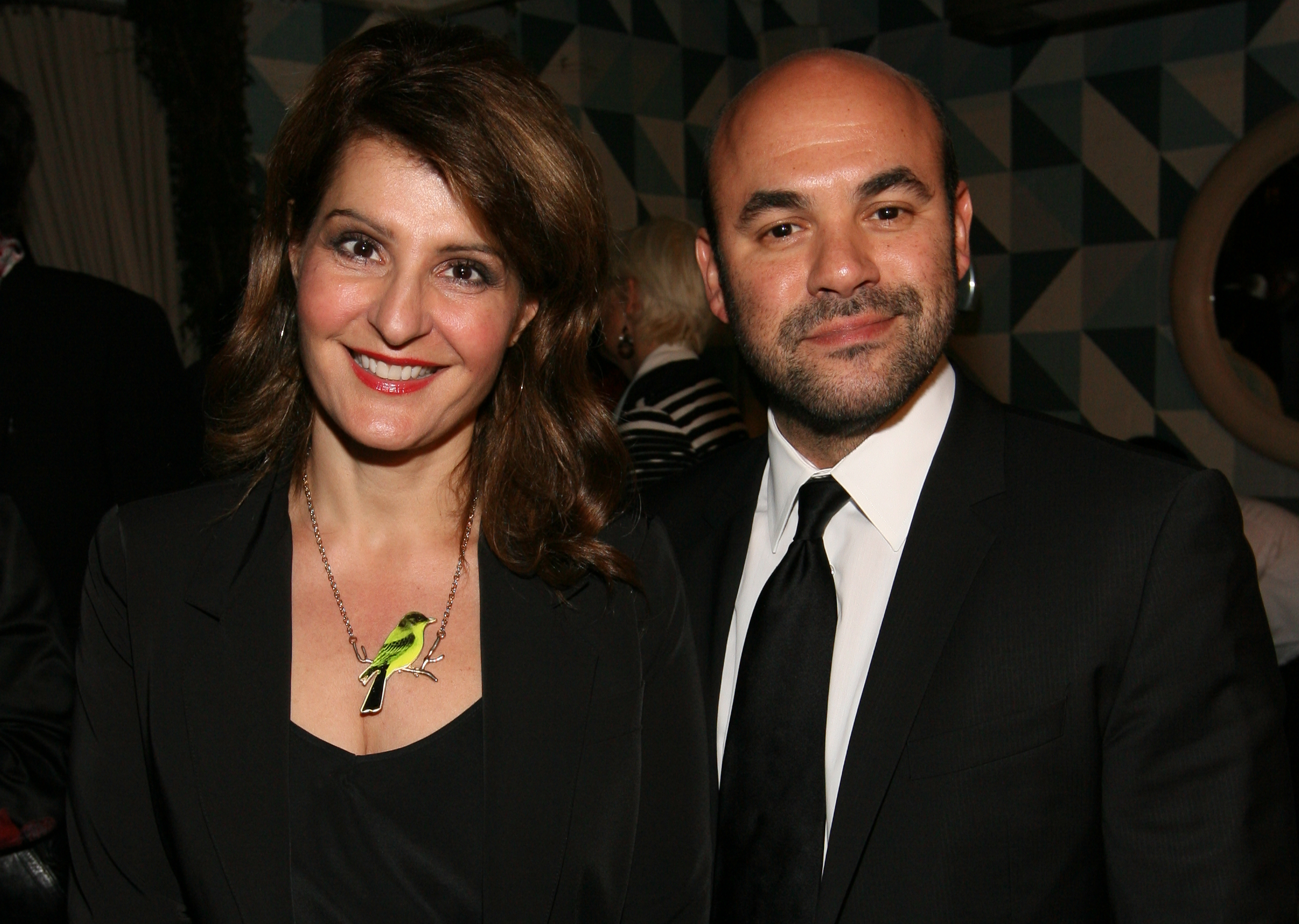
Gomez with then-wife Nia Vardalos in 2012

Gomez took the part of Andy Torres in the ABC and later TBS comedy Cougar Town alongside fellow The Drew Carey Show castmate Christa Miller, from 2009 to 2015. In 2016, Gomez and his then-wife, Nia Vardalos, co-presented The Great American Baking Show, a revival of The Great Holiday Baking Show.

In 2019, he appeared in the Clint Eastwood film Richard Jewell.

In 2020, Gomez was cast in the role of Luis Flores in the NBC comedy pilot Night School based on the 2018 film and written by Christopher Moynihan. However, NBC ultimately decided not to move forward with the series.

== Personal life ==
He was married to actress-writer Nia Vardalos of My Big Fat Greek Wedding film series. He appeared in her films My Big Fat Greek Wedding, Connie and Carla, My Life in Ruins, I Hate Valentine's Day, and My Big Fat Greek Wedding 2. Gomez is of Puerto Rican and Russian Jewish descent, and converted to Greek Orthodoxy upon marrying Vardalos, which is mirrored as a plot element in My Big Fat Greek Wedding. In 2008, the two adopted a child. It was announced on July 3, 2018, that Vardalos filed for divorce from Gomez after 25 years of marriage due to irreconcilable differences. The divorce was finalized in September 2018.

== Filmography ==
=== Film ===
Year	Title	Role
1993	Excessive Force	Lucas
1993	Rookie of the Year	Odd Bellman
1997	'Til There Was You	Scott
1997	Courting Courtney	Hank
1999	EDtv	Mcllvaine
2001	The Center of the World	Delivery Man
2001	Almost Salinas	Manny
2002	My Big Fat Greek Wedding	Mike
2002	Meet Prince Charming	Gino
2003	Street of Pain	Beau
2003	Chasing Papi	Doctor Chu
2003	Dickie Roberts: Former Child Star	Strange Man
2004	Connie and Carla	Stanley
2004	The Last Shot	Agent Nance
2005	Getting To Know You	Russ
2005	Underclassman	Detective Gallecki
2006	You Did What?	Dr. Bob
2007	Love Shack	Mo Saltzman
2009	My Life in Ruins	Motel Clerk
2009	I Hate Valentine's Day	KJ Ken
2011	Larry Crowne	Frank
2013	Dealin' with Idiots	Commissioner Gordon
2014	Free Fall	Ronald Taft
2015	Always Worthy	Ricky
2015	Larry Gaye: Renegade Male Flight Attendant	Captain Felder
2016	My Big Fat Greek Wedding 2	Mike
2018	Dude	Jerry
2018	Spare Room	Mr. Larry
2019	Richard Jewell	Agent Dan Bennet
2021	Barb and Star Go to Vista Del Mar	Retail store manager
2021	The Ultimate Playlist of Noise	Dominic

=== Television ===
Year	Title	Role	Notes
1993	Missing Persons	Pete, the Morgue Technician	6 episodes
1995	Married... with Children	Employee #1	Episode: "Get the Dodge Outta Hell"
1995–1996	Murphy Brown	Secretary #77, Mimicking Secretary	Episodes: "Bad Company", "Defending Your Life"
1995–2004	The Drew Carey Show	Larry Almada	38 episodes
1998	Melrose Place	Hotel Employee	Episodes: "Divorce Dominican Style", "A Long Way to Tip-A-Rory"
1998	Smart Guy	Art Bruno	Episode: "Achy Breaky Heart"
1998–2002	Felicity	Javier Clemente Quintata	Recurring (seasons 1–3); Main cast (season 4): 45 episodes
1999	Whose Line Is It Anyway?	Himself	Season 1, episode 14
1999–2001	The Norm Show	Danny Sanchez	54 episodes
2000	Happily Ever After: Fairy Tales for Every Child	Basilio	Episode: "Robinita Hood"
2001	Danny	Martinez	Episode: Pilot
2002	Get a Clue	Mr. Orlando Walker / Nicholas Petrossian	TV movie
2002	NYPD Blue	Joel Robinson	Episode: "One in the Nuts"
2002	Curb Your Enthusiasm	Bald Chef	Episodes: "The Corpse-Sniffing Dog", "The Grand Opening"
2003	Exit 9	Gary	TV movie
2003	Lucky	Pete	Episode: "Lie, Cheat & Deal"
2003	The Lyon's Den	Special Agent Sasser	Episode: "The Fifth"
2004	George Lopez	Jewelry Salesman	Episode: "George of the Rings"
2005–2006	Jake in Progress	Adrian	Main cast
2006	Reba	Therapist	Episode: "Here We Go Again"
2006	Lost	Munson	Episode: "Every Man for Himself"
2006	Whose Line Is It Anyway?	Himself	Season 8, episode 14
2006	7th Heaven	Psychologist	Episode: "Don't Ax, Don't Tell"
2006–2007	Campus Ladies	Roger	Episodes: "Spring Break", "Psych 101"
2007	The Beast	Ron	TV movie
2007	Heroes	Art Dealer	Episode: "Parasite"
2007	My Boys	Turk Vardell	Episode: "Off Day"
2008	According to Jim	Detective	Episode: "The Rendezvous"
2008	Reaper	Jack King	Episode: "Coming to Grips
2008	Gary Unmarried	Paulie	Episode: "Gary and Allison's Restaurant"
2008–2009	Rita Rocks	Owen	25 episodes
2009	Life	Asst. Coroner Tom Santos	Episode: "5 Quartz"
2009	True Jackson, VP	Jobi Castanueva	Episode: "Fashion Week"
2009–2015	Cougar Town	Andy Torres	Main cast
2010	Royal Pains	Mac	Episode: "Comfort's Overload"
2011	Grey's Anatomy	Doctor	Episode: "Love, Loss and Legacy"; Uncredited
2011	The Middle	Neighbor	Episode: "Bad Choices"; Uncredited
2012	Doc McStuffins	Ricardo race car (voice)	Episode: "Out of the Box/Run Down Race Car"
2012	Touch	Wade	Episode: "Gyre, Part 1"
2012	Drop Dead Diva	Warren Patton	Episode: "Road Trip"
2014	Cuz-Bros	Phil	TV movie
2015–2017	The Great American Baking Show	Co-presenter (with Nia Vardalos)	Baking competition
2016	The Real O'Neals	Michael-Gregory	Episode: "The Real Spring Fever"
2016	Angel from Hell	The Oyster King	Episode: "Funsgiving"
2016–2017	Supergirl	Snapper Carr	7 episodes
2017	Fresh Off the Boat	Robert	2 episodes
2018	Living Biblically	Father Gene	Main cast
2019	The Morning Show	Greg	Recurring
2019	Man with a Plan	James	Episode: "Semi-Indecent Proposal"
2019	Superstore	Herb	Episode: "Negotiations"
2020	American Housewife	Brecken Phillips	Episode: "Wildflower Girls"
2021–2023	Physical	Ernie Hauser	15 episodes
2022	The Conners	Father Morton	Episode: "A Judge and a Priest Walk Into a Living Room..."
2022	Murderville	Kevin Rivera	Episode: "Most Likely to Commit Murder"
2022–2023	Single Drunk Female	Bob	17 episodes
2023	The Goldbergs	Diego	Episode: "Uptown Boy"

== See also ==
- List of famous Puerto Ricans
