= Paul Hollywood =

English baker and chef (born 1966)

Paul Hollywood MBE
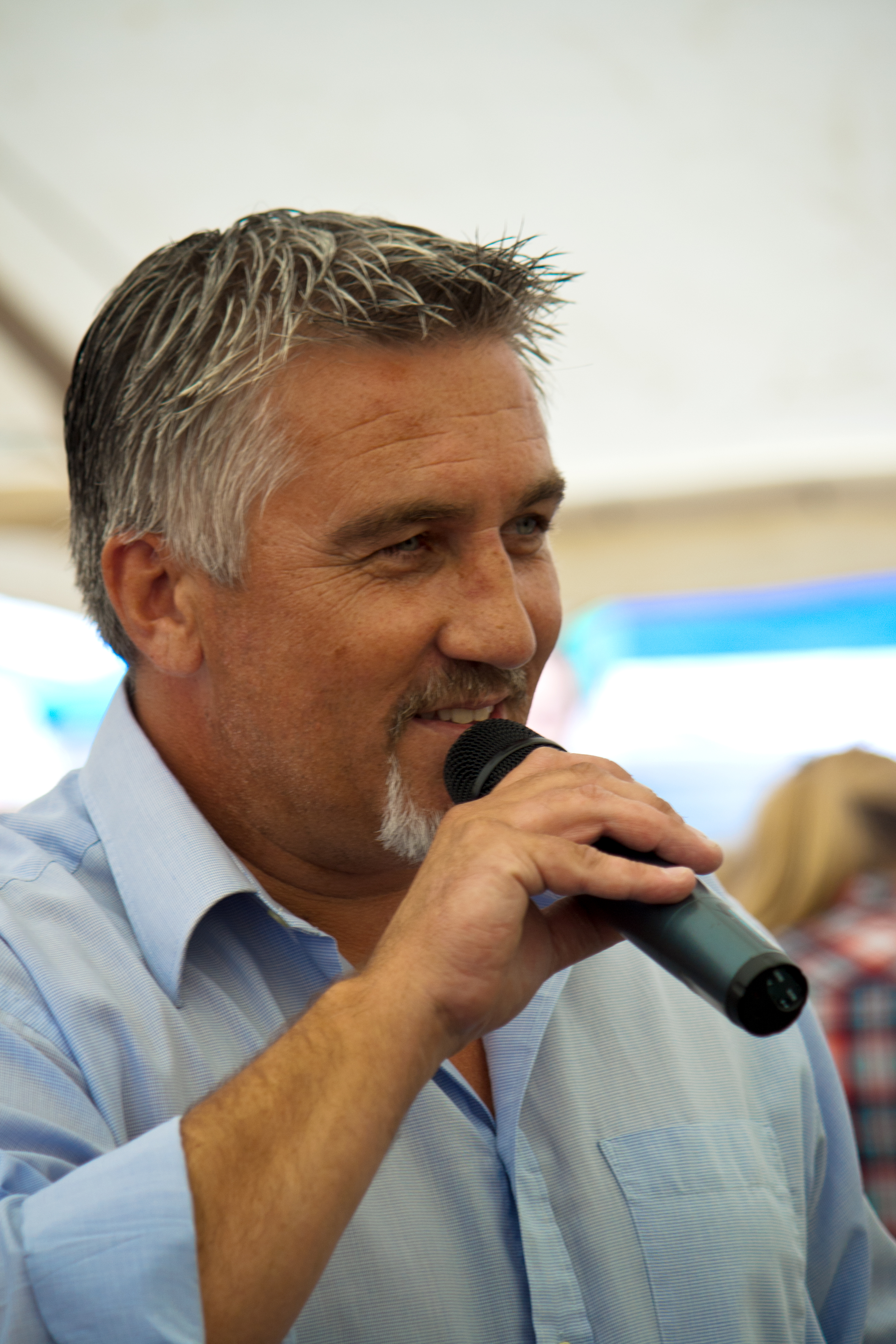
- Hollywood at the 2012 Liverpool Food and Drink Festival
- Born: Paul John Hollywood; 1 March 1966 (age 60); Wallasey, Cheshire, (Note: In 1966, when Hollywood was born, Wallasey was part of Cheshire; in the local government re-organisation of 1974, it became part of Merseyside.) England
- Education: Wallasey School of Art
- Spouse(s): Alexandra Hollywood (m. 1998; div. 2019) Melissa Spalding (m. 2023)
- Children: 1
- Culinary career
- Cooking style: Baking
- Television shows
- Paul Hollywood: City Bakes; Paul Hollywood's Pies and Puds; The Great British Bake Off; The American Baking Competition; Use Your Loaf; Paul Hollywood's Bread; The Great American Baking Show; Paul Hollywood: A Bakers Life; Paul Hollywood's Big Continental Road Trip
- Awardss
- Gourmand World Cookbook Awards Top Bread and Pastry Book (2005)
- Website: Official website

Paul John Hollywood (born 1 March 1966) is an English celebrity chef and television personality, widely known as a judge on The Great British Bake Off since 2010.

Hollywood began his career at his father's bakery as a teenager and went on to serve as head baker at a number of British and international hotels. After returning from working in Cyprus, Hollywood appeared as a guest on a number of British television programmes on both BBC and ITV. After beginning his broadcast career in food programming, he diversified into other areas, including motoring.

== Early life, education and early career ==
Hollywood was born in 1966 in Wallasey, Cheshire, the son of bakery proprietor John F. Hollywood and Gillian M. Hollywood (née Harman). He was a pupil at The Mosslands School. Hollywood studied sculpture at the Wallasey School of Art based at Liscard Hall, but left to start work as a baker.

He first worked in his father's bakery in York (the headquarters of a chain called Bread Winner, which eventually stretched all the way down the east coast from Aberdeen to Lincolnshire) and then in other bakeries on Merseyside. He eventually went on to become head baker at a number of hotels, including The Dorchester, Chester Grosvenor and Spa, and the Cliveden Hotel. He then left the UK for Cyprus, where he worked at two resorts.

== Television and media career ==
Hollywood has appeared in guest spots on a number of television programmes, including BBC One's The Generation Game, The Heaven and Earth Show, ITV's This Morning, and The Alan Titchmarsh Show. Since the show launched in 2010, Hollywood has been a judge on the BBC programme The Great British Bake Off. In this capacity, he has been described as the "antidote" to judges such as Len Goodman or Simon Cowell in other reality television programmes, on account of his straightforward and honest manner and because his judging is restricted purely to the finished product. His partnership with Mary Berry has been described in The Guardian as being the "secret weapon" of the show and potentially one of the best judging combinations to have appeared on reality television. In September 2016, Love Productions agreed to a three-year deal to move the show from the BBC to Channel 4. Hosts Mel Giedroyc and Sue Perkins announced that they would not be moving to the new network, followed shortly after by Berry. On the same day as Berry, Hollywood announced that he would be staying with the show.

The Gourmand World Cookbook Awards named his 2005 book 100 Great Breads as the "Top Bread and Pastry Book" for that year.

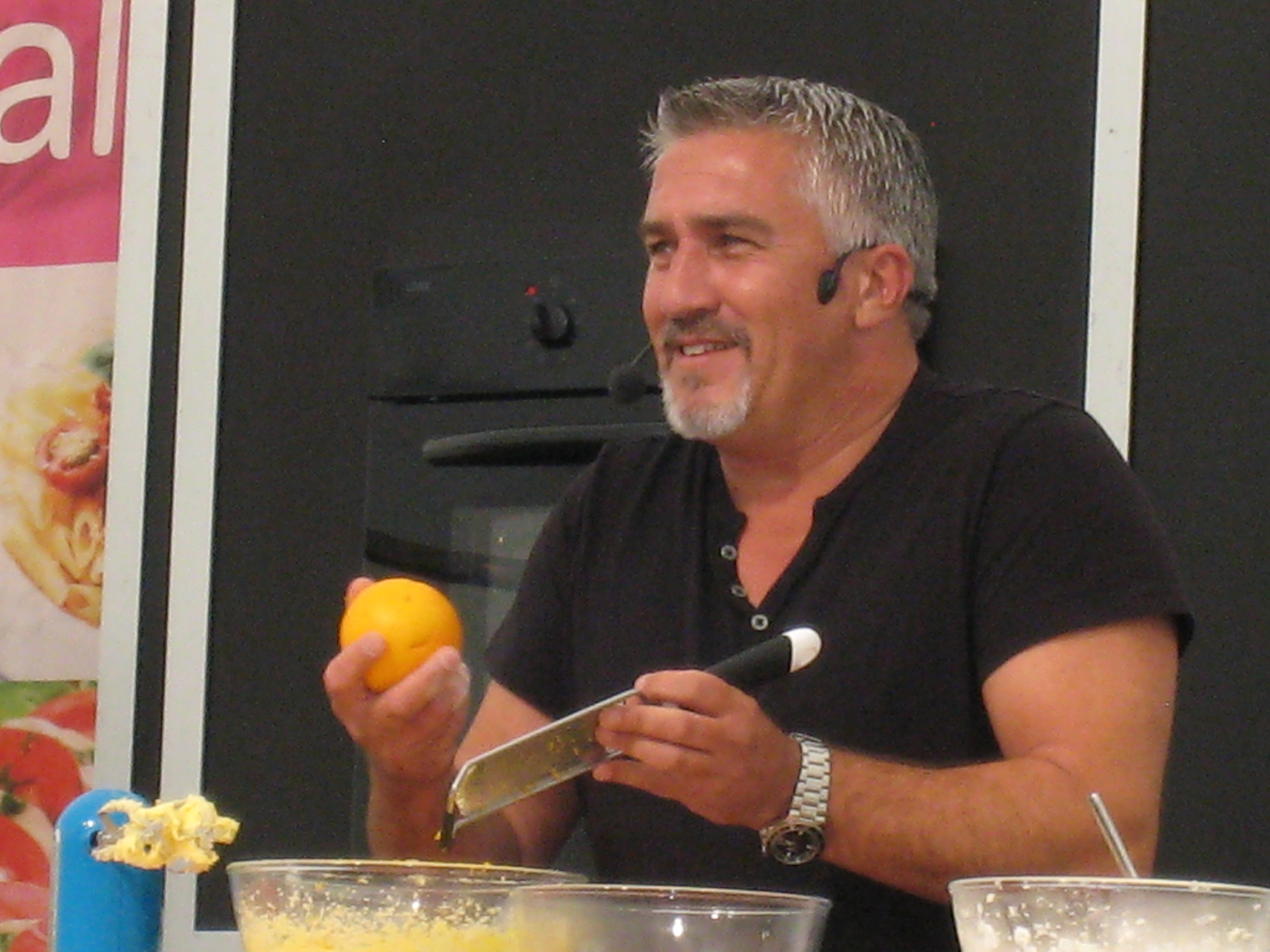
Paul Hollywood zesting an orange at the Stratford Food Festival

In 2008, Hollywood created an almond and roquefort sourdough recipe that was said to be the most expensive bread in Britain. The roquefort is supplied from a specialist in France at £15 per kilo, while the flour for the bread is made by a miller in Wiltshire. Hollywood describes it as a "Rolls-Royce of loaves". Hollywood is a guest speaker at several food festivals, including the Cumbrian Food Festival, and the BBC Good Food Show and the Cake and Bake Show, both in London. In May 2013, Hollywood began appearing as a judge on The American Baking Competition on CBS.

Hollywood has also starred in Sadie J, a children's television programme. In 2013, he presented Paul Hollywood’s Bread on BBC Two, in which he gave advice on recipes for different types of bread; however, also featured on the series were recipes for some cakes such as the Danish pastry. He also presented Paul Hollywood's Pies and Puds, a cookery television series on BBC One.

In August 2015, Hollywood was featured on the BBC genealogy documentary series Who Do You Think You Are?. The programme revealed that his grandfather Norman Harman, who served in the Army during World War II, saw action in the Tunisia Campaign and at the Battle of Anzio and that his great-great-grandfather, Kenneth MacKenzie, had been a policeman in the City of Glasgow Police in the 1850s. Hollywood's great-great-great-grandfather, Donald MacKenzie, had been a crofter in Poolewe, Wester Ross. Donald had also been the post-runner between Poolewe and Dingwall, where he delivered post on foot over a distance of 60 miles (97 km). He covered this distance every week, during his forties, on foot for over a decade. He lived into his 80s.

In May and June 2017, he presented Paul Hollywood's Big Continental Road Trip. In December 2017, Hollywood appeared as a judge on The Great American Baking Show, the second incarnation of the GBBO series in the United States.

In 2019, Hollywood made a comment on The Great British Bake Off that a cake looked like "diabetes on a plate" and after complaints, he apologised on his social media. In November 2019, the four-part series Paul Goes to Hollywood premiered on Food Network; the series follows Paul Hollywood on a 3000-mile culinary road trip across America, travelling from New York to Los Angeles on a Harley-Davidson motorcycle.

Hollywood travelled across Japan to discover some of the finest culinary experiences the country has to offer in the three-part Channel 4 series called Paul Hollywood Eats Japan; aired during April–May 2020.

In December 2020, Hollywood was featured in a two-part Channel 4 series called The Great British Bake Off: Best Bits; celebrating some of the most memorable moments from the first ten years of the series.

Later in mid-2022, the three-part series Paul Hollywood Eats Mexico premiered on Channel 4; the series follows Paul Hollywood as he experiences authentic local cuisine on a culinary tour across Mexico.

In May 2023, Hollywood appeared in the trailer for the BBC coverage of the Eurovision Song Contest, which was being hosted that year in Liverpool.

== Motor racing ==
In 2015, Hollywood began his racing career; in that year, he made his debut in the Beechdean AMR Aston Martin Vantage GT4 with Andrew Howard, founder of Beechdean Dairies. The pair qualified second in the Britcar Trophy Championship's first round at Silverstone taking second in class in both races. He also competed at Le Mans in 2015 in the Aston Martin festival. Hollywood has also competed in GT Cup with Jonny Adam and finished first in class. He entered the British GT championship in 2016 and competed in the last three rounds with Jamie Chadwick as his driving partner. In July 2017 he came first in class at the Dunlop endurance race at Silverstone in an Aston Martin GT4, and in November 2017 he raced in his first 24 hr race at Circuit of the Americas coming second in class in an Aston Martin GT8.

== Personal life ==
Hollywood met his now-former wife Alexandra in Cyprus where he was a head baker at a five-star hotel and she was a scuba diving instructor. They later married on the island. They have a son.

Hollywood separated from Alexandra in 2013 after having an affair with his The American Baking Competition co-judge Marcela Valladolid. They later reconciled, then separated again in November 2017 and divorced in July 2019. In August 2019 Hollywood split from 23-year-old girlfriend Summer Monteys-Fullam, ending a two-year relationship.

In September 2023 Hollywood married Melissa Spalding in Cyprus.

He was appointed Member of the Order of the British Empire (MBE) in the 2024 New Year Honours for services to baking and broadcasting.

== Bibliography ==
- 100 Great Breads (2004) Cassell, London ISBN 978-1844037001
- How to Bake (2012) Bloomsbury ISBN 978-1408819494
- Paul Hollywood’s Bread (2013) Bloomsbury, London ISBN 978-1408840696
- Paul Hollywood’s Pies and Puds (2013) Bloomsbury, London ISBN 978-1408846438
- Paul Hollywood’s British Baking (2014) Bloomsbury USA ISBN 1408846489 ISBN 978-1408846483
- The Weekend Baker (2016) Michael Joseph, London ISBN 978-0718184018
- A Baker’s Life (2017) Bloomsbury, London ISBN 978-1408846506
- 100 Great Breads (2020) Cassell, London ISBN 978-1788402149
- The Great British Bake Off: Love to Bake (2020) Sphere, London ISBN 978-0751574685
- Great British Baking Show Book (28 September 2021) Mobius ISBN 978-0751584172
- Bake (9 June 2022) Bloomsbury Publishing ISBN 978-1526647160
- Celebrate: Joyful Baking All Year Round (5 June 2025) Bloomsbury Publishing ISBN 978-1526678959
