= Anthony Adams =

American television host, actor and comedian

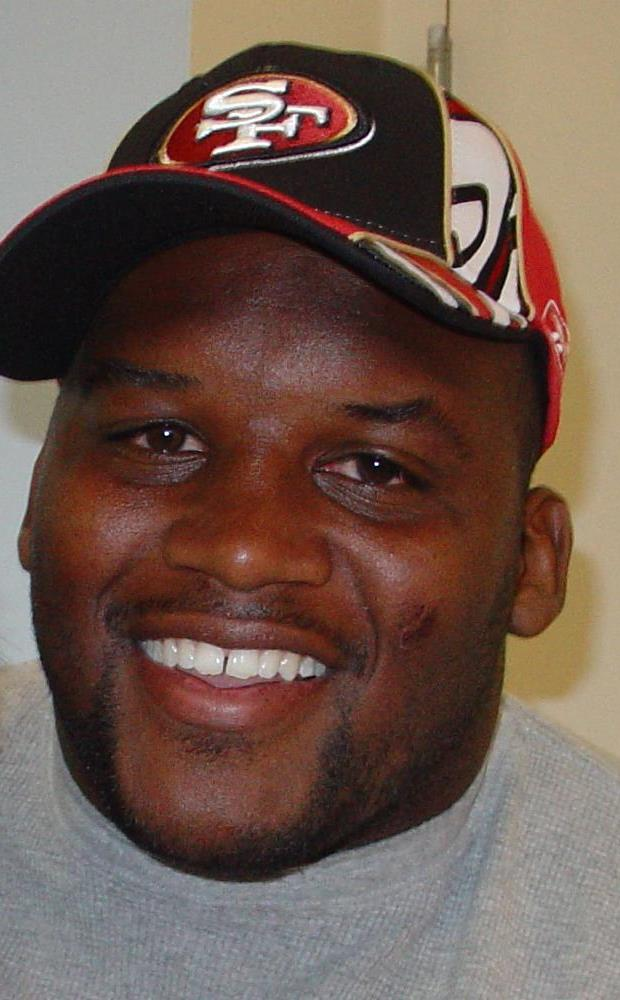
- Adams with the San Francisco 49ers in 2005

No. 91, 95
- Position: Defensive tackle

Personal information
- Born: June 18, 1980 (age 46); Detroit, Michigan, U.S.
- Listed height: 6 ft 0 in (1.83 m)
- Listed weight: 310 lb (141 kg)

Career information
- High school: King (Detroit)
- College: Penn State (1998–2002)
- NFL draft: 2003: 2nd round, 57th overall pick

Career history
- San Francisco 49ers (2003–2006); Chicago Bears (2007–2011)

Career NFL statistics
- Total tackles: 278
- Sacks: 10.5
- Forced fumbles: 3
- Stats at Pro Football Reference

Anthony "Spice" Adams (born June 18, 1980) is an American television host, actor, comedian, and former professional football player. He played as a defensive tackle for nine seasons in the National Football League (NFL). After playing college football for the Penn State Nittany Lions, Adams was selected by the San Francisco 49ers in the second round of the 2003 NFL draft, for whom he played four seasons, followed by the Chicago Bears from 2007 to 2011.

After his football career, Adams became involved in social media and television. He is a former co-host of The Great American Baking Show, the American adaptation of The Great British Bake Off.

== Early life and college ==
Adams attended Martin Luther King Jr. Senior High School in Detroit, Michigan, and Pennsylvania State University. He played for the Penn State Nittany Lions football team from 1999 to 2002, being named to the academic all-Big Ten Conference team and honorable mention all-Big Ten.

During his freshman year, he recorded four tackles in nine games, which increased to 36 tackles and a sack the following season. As a junior, he had 59 tackles, 3.5 sacks, and led the team in tackles-for-loss with 11. In his senior year, he had 67 tackles, two sacks, 13 tackles-for-loss, and four pass breakups. The 2002 Nittany Lions entered the 2003 Capital One Bowl with the chance to record their first top-ten ranking since 1996, but lost to Auburn.

Adams graduated with a business degree in 2003.

== Professional career ==
=== Pre-draft ===
Pre-draft measurables
Height	Weight	Arm length	Hand span	40-yard dash	10-yard split	20-yard split	20-yard shuttle	Three-cone drill	Vertical jump	Broad jump
5 ft 11 5/8 in (1.82 m)	299 lb (136 kg)	31 1/2 in (0.80 m)	9 in (0.23 m)	5.13 s	1.78 s	2.92 s	4.59 s	7.68 s	30.5 in (0.77 m)	9 ft 1 in (2.77 m)
All values from NFL Combine

Before the 2003 NFL draft, Adams participated in the Senior Bowl. Representing the North alongside four of his Penn State teammates, his team won 17–0.

=== San Francisco 49ers ===
The San Francisco 49ers selected Adams in the second round (57th overall) of the 2003 NFL draft; the 49ers, who lost two starting defensive linemen during the offseason, drafted Adams and defensive end Andrew Williams in the following round to fill the gap.

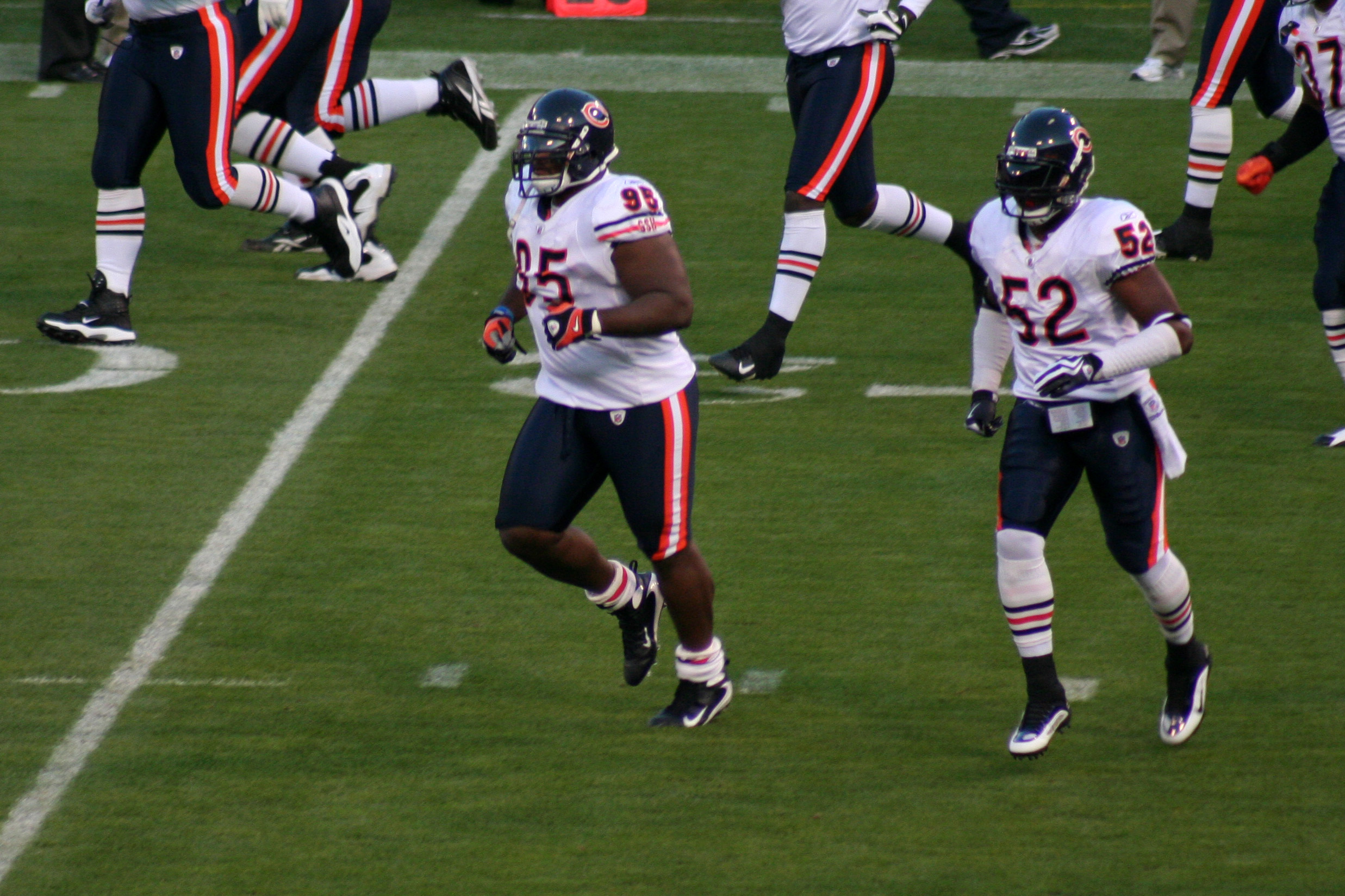
Adams and Jamar Williams taking the field in 2009

Adams became a free agent after the 2006 season, ending his 49ers tenure with 155 tackles and six sacks in 58 games.

=== Chicago Bears ===
On March 25, 2007, he signed a four-year contract with the Chicago Bears; team writer Larry Mayer described Adams as "an undersized but quick tackle who seemingly is an ideal fit for the Bears' one-gap defense." In 2010, he started all 16 games and the Bears' playoff games; at season's end, he was named a Brian Piccolo Award recipient. The following season, he only started four games and appeared in 11, and was released on February 26, 2012.

He announced his retirement via YouTube on March 24, 2013. In nine seasons, he served primarily as a depth player, starting at least eight games in three years. He ended his career with 278 tackles and 10.5 sacks.

== NFL career statistics ==
Legend
**Bold**	Career high

=== Regular season ===
Year	Team	Games		Tackles					Interceptions					Fumbles			
Year	Team	GP	GS	Cmb	Solo	Ast	Sck	TFL	Int	Yds	TD	Lng	PD	FF	FR	Yds	TD
2003	SFO	14	1	26	20	6	1.5	5	0	0	0	0	**4**	0	0	0	0
2004	SFO	14	12	**48**	**41**	7	0.0	6	0	0	0	0	2	1	0	0	0
2005	SFO	**16**	**16**	40	24	**16**	**2.5**	3	0	0	0	0	1	0	0	0	0
2006	SFO	14	5	20	12	8	2.0	1	0	0	0	0	1	0	0	0	0
2007	CHI	11	8	26	21	5	0.5	4	0	0	0	0	0	0	1	0	0
2008	CHI	9	4	21	14	7	0.0	0	0	0	0	0	0	0	0	0	0
2009	CHI	**16**	8	44	36	8	2.0	3	0	0	0	0	1	0	**2**	**3**	0
2010	CHI	**16**	**16**	37	33	4	2.0	**9**	0	0	0	0	1	**2**	0	0	0
2011	CHI	11	4	16	13	3	0.0	2	0	0	0	0	0	0	0	0	0
		121	74	278	214	64	10.5	33	0	0	0	0	10	3	3	3	0

=== Playoffs ===
Year	Team	Games		Tackles					Interceptions					Fumbles			
Year	Team	GP	GS	Cmb	Solo	Ast	Sck	TFL	Int	Yds	TD	Lng	PD	FF	FR	Yds	TD
2010	CHI	**2**	**2**	**1**	**1**	0	0.0	0	0	0	0	0	0	0	0	0	0
		2	2	1	1	0	0.0	0	0	0	0	0	0	0	0	0	0

== Personal life ==
Adams and his wife, Andenika, have four children. Teammates have bestowed several nicknames on Adams: Former 49ers teammate Bryant Young dubbed him "Double A" not only for his initials but also for his suspicion that Adams' extra energy came from batteries. His Penn State teammates nicknamed him "Spice". Adams was voted "Mama's Boy" his senior year at Martin Luther King High School in Detroit. He is a member of Omega Psi Phi fraternity and was initiated at Nu chapter. In the summer of 2012, Adams produced a series of videos on YouTube about life as an NFL free agent. On May 5, 2013, Adams earned his master's degree in business administration from George Washington University.

=== Community involvement ===
Since 2006, Adams has been involved with Youthville, a program in his hometown of Detroit. He gave away two Super Bowl XL tickets to the student who demonstrated the greatest improvement in grade point average. In 2009, Adams visited several Chicago Public Schools to help students write letters to troops overseas during the Iraq and Afghanistan wars.

== Media career ==
During his tenure with the 49ers, Adams was a blogger and hosted an online show with teammate Mike Adams called The Adams Report.

Starting on September 14, 2013, Adams began hosting a weekly half-hour show titled Inside the Bears, which airs on WFLD and WPWR-TV.

In 2016, Adams began a recurring role on the HBO series Ballers. He was announced on September 21, 2017, as one of the new hosts of The Great American Baking Show, an American adaptation of The Great British Bake Off, on ABC.

Adams is well known for his Instagram account, where he posts comedic videos under the username "spiceadams". Many of the characters and skits he has created have gone viral since 2018; an example is his catchphrase "ahaha", which became the subject of multiple memes on Twitter, and a photo of him hiding behind a tree in a bright yellow suit while rubbing his hands together and licking his lips in an expression of desire for what he is looking at.
