= Johnny Iuzzini =

Pastry chef

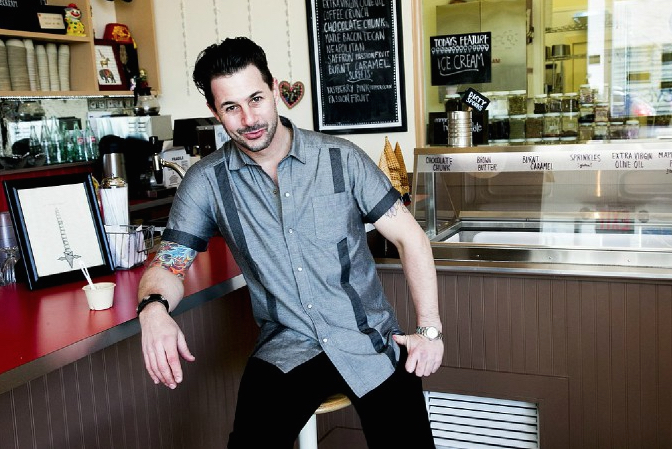
- Iuzzini in 2014
- Born: August 31, 1974 (age 52); New York
- Occupations: Pastry chef, cookbook author, TV celebrity
- Years active: 1994–present
- Website: www.johnnyiuzzini.com

Johnny Iuzzini (/u-zee-nee/; born August 31, 1974) is a New York City-based American pastry chef, television celebrity, and cookbook author. He served as executive pastry chef at Daniel from 2001 through 2002 and at Jean Georges from 2002 through 2011. Iuzzini is the author of two cookbooks and was a judge on the first three seasons of The Great American Baking Show. On November 29, 2017, Iuzzini was accused of sexual harassment by four former employees and the third season of The Great American Baking Show was pulled after one episode.

== Early life ==
Iuzzini was born on August 31, 1974, and raised in the Catskills region of New York. His father was a plumbing and heating technician, his mother a veterinarian assistant and wildlife rehabilitator.

== Career ==
=== Beginnings ===
Iuzzini's first restaurant job was after school as a part-time dishwasher at the local golf club. At the time, he was enrolled in his high school's voc-tech culinary program. Iuzzini garnered his first cooking award by finishing second in a New York City culinary competition. At age seventeen, he took a job as garde manger, beginning his career in New York City, and began assisting Pastry Chef Eric Gouteyron at the latter's restaurant. He then switched jobs to work making desserts full-time, launching his career as a pastry chef. He attended The Culinary Institute of America in Hyde Park, New York, graduating in 1994 with a Baking and Pastry Arts degree.

=== Pastry chef ===
During his externship at the Culinary Institute of America, Iuzzini worked with pastry chef Lincoln Carson at Luxe. Iuzzini and Carson then began working for Francois Payard. During the next three and a half years, he managed all dessert stations at Daniel and became Payard's close assistant. When Payard opened his Payard Pâtisserie and Bistro in 1997, Iuzzini was selected as sous chef while continuing to work at Daniel.

In 1998, Iuzzini studied pastry technique while staging at several of the country's finest patisseries. After eight months around the world, he returned to New York to work for Daniel Boulud, opening Café Boulud and the new Daniel as Executive Sous Chef. In 2001, Boulud promoted the 26-year-old Iuzzini to Executive Pastry Chef.

In May 2002, Jean-Georges Vongerichten selected Iuzzini for Executive Pastry Chef at Restaurant Jean Georges. Iuzzini was named the “Best Pastry Chef” by New York Magazine in 2002, nominated for “Outstanding Pastry Chef of the Year” nomination by the James Beard Foundation in 2003, and named one of the “Ten Best Pastry Chefs in America” by Pastry Art and Design Magazine in 2003 and 2004. In 2006, Iuzzini was awarded Outstanding Pastry Chef of the Year by the James Beard Foundation. 2007 landed him among the honorees of the title of “10 Most Influential Chefs in America” from Forbes, as one of the “Tastemaking Chefs”.

=== Pastry and culinary arts consulting ===
In 2011 Iuzzini started a pastry and culinary arts consulting company, Sugar Fueled, Inc, performing demonstrations of pastry techniques to live audiences. In 2014, he entered a partnership with Le Méridien Hotels & Resorts.

=== Television ===
In September 2010, Iuzzini was cast for two seasons as head judge on the American reality competition show Top Chef: Just Desserts on the Bravo cable television network. In 2011, the show received the GLAAD Media Award nomination for Outstanding Reality Program. On October 23, 2014, he appeared as a competitor in the "Superstar Sabotage" tournament of Cutthroat Kitchen.

== Sexual harassment allegations ==
On November 29, 2017, Iuzzini was accused of sexual harassment by four of his former employees. As a result of the accusations against Iuzzini, the third season of The Great American Baking Show was pulled after one episode. On December 13, 2017, Iuzzini was fired from ABC and The Great American Baking Show following the sexual misconduct allegations.

== Books ==
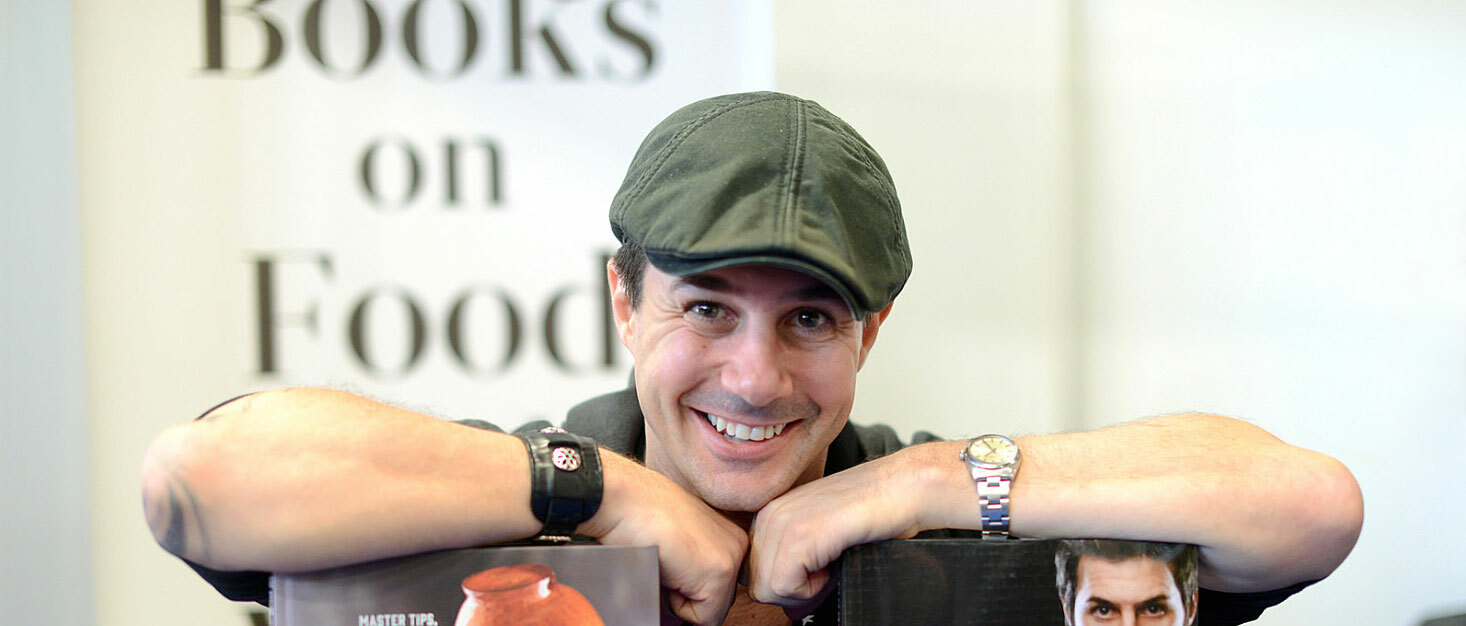
Iuzzini at a book signing in 2014

In Dessert Fourplay, Iuzzini provides recipes based upon his after-dinner quartet offerings from Jean Georges. His second cookbook was titled Sugar Rush and intended for home cooks.

== Cookbooks ==
- Iuzzini, Johnny; Finamore, Roy (December 2008). Dessert FourPlay: Sweet Quartets from a Four-Star Pastry Chef. Clarkson Potter. ISBN 978-0-307-35137-1.
- Iuzzini, Johnny; Martin, Wes (September 2014). Sugar Rush: Master Tips, Techniques, and Recipes for Sweet Baking. Clarkson Potter. ISBN 978-0-770-43369-7.
