= Neil Patrick Harris =

American actor and singer (born 1973)

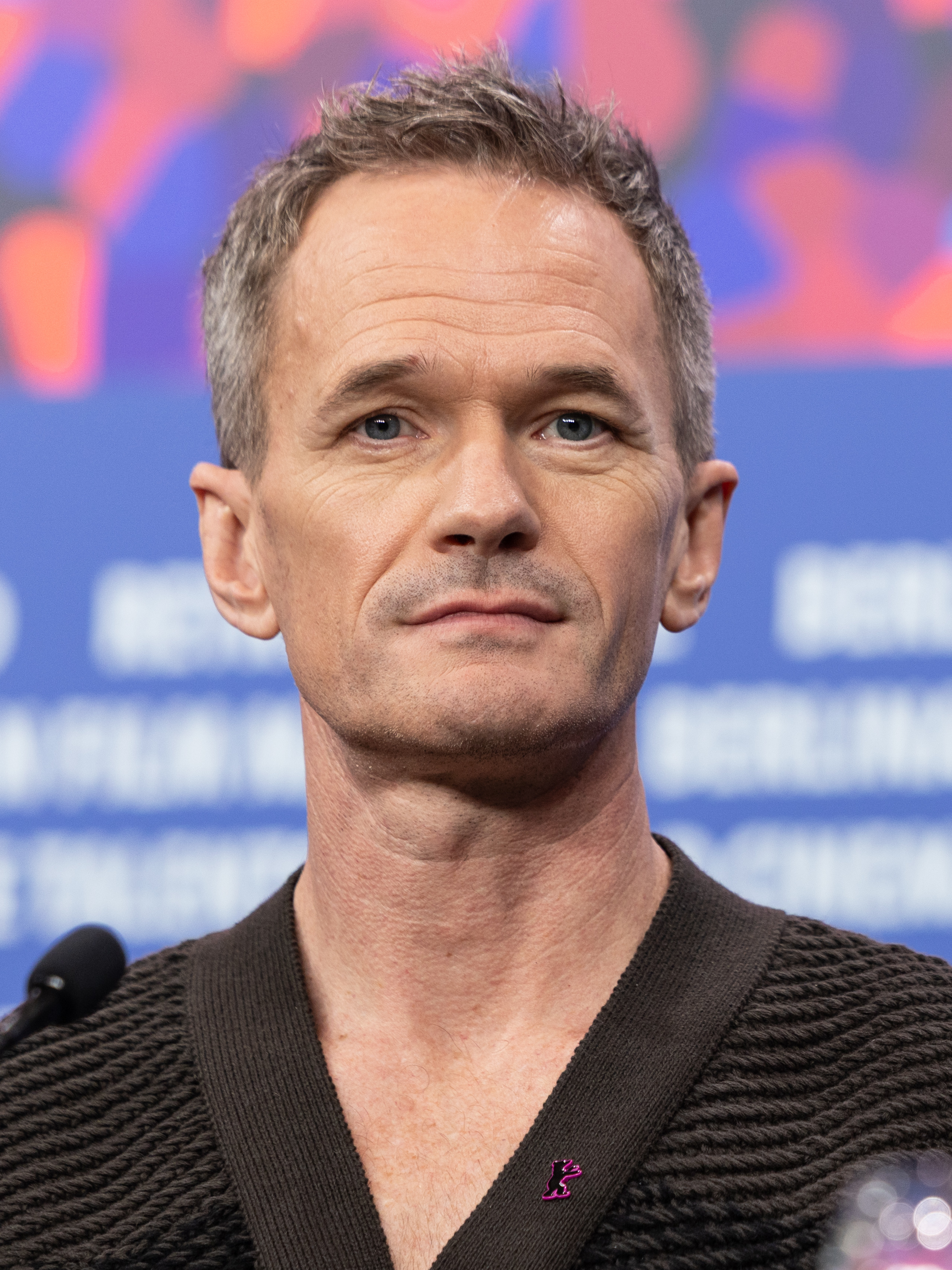
- Harris in 2026
- Born: June 15, 1973 (age 53); Albuquerque, New Mexico, U.S.
- Occupations: Actor; singer; writer; producer; television host
- Years active: 1988–present
- Spouse: David Burtka (m. 2014)
- Children: 2
- Awards: Full list

Neil Patrick Harris (born June 15, 1973) is an American actor, singer, writer, producer, television host, comedian and magician. Primarily known for his comedic television roles and dramatic and musical stage roles, he has received multiple accolades throughout his career, including a Tony Award and five Primetime Emmy Awards, and nominations for a Grammy Award and three Actor Awards.

On television, he is known for playing the title character on the ABC series Doogie Howser, M.D. (1989–1993), for which he was nominated for the Golden Globe Award for Best Actor – Television Series Musical or Comedy, as well as Barney Stinson on the CBS series How I Met Your Mother (2005–2014), for which he was nominated for four Emmy Awards, and Count Olaf on the Netflix series A Series of Unfortunate Events (2017–2019). He won the Primetime Emmy Award for Outstanding Guest Actor in a Comedy Series for his role on Glee (2010). Harris is also known for portraying the title character in Joss Whedon's musical Dr. Horrible's Sing-Along Blog (2008), and a fictional version of himself in the Harold & Kumar film series (2004–2011). His other films include Starship Troopers (1997), The Smurfs (2011), The Smurfs 2 (2013), and Gone Girl (2014).

On stage, he starred as Mark Cohen in the national tour of Rent (1997), before making his Broadway debut in the David Auburn play Proof (2002). He went on to win the Tony Award for Best Leading Actor in a Musical playing the title role in the rock musical Hedwig and the Angry Inch (2014). Harris has hosted numerous award shows, including the Tony Awards in 2009, 2011, 2012, and 2013, the Primetime Emmy Awards in 2009 and 2013, and the Academy Awards in 2015. He was named one of Time magazine's 100 Most Influential People in 2010.

== Early life and education ==
Neil Patrick Harris was born on June 15, 1973, in Albuquerque, New Mexico, and grew up in Ruidoso, New Mexico, with his older brother and their parents, Sheila Gail (née Scott) and Ronald Gene Harris. Both parents were lawyers and also ran a restaurant. He attended La Cueva High School in Albuquerque, graduating with high honors in 1991, which he attributes to being privately tutored half the school year while on a set.

== Career ==
=== 1989–2003 ===
Harris began his career as a child actor and was discovered by playwright Mark Medoff at a drama camp in Las Cruces, New Mexico. Medoff later cast him in the drama film Clara's Heart (1988). Clara's Heart earned Harris a Golden Globe nomination in 1989. That same year, Harris starred in Purple People Eater, a children's fantasy. Beginning in 1989, Harris played the title role of a child prodigy doctor in Doogie Howser, M.D., for which he was nominated for another Golden Globe award. After the show's four-season run ended in 1993, Harris played a number of guest roles on television series, including Murder, She Wrote. From 1999 to 2000, he starred in the NBC sitcom Stark Raving Mad, which lasted 22 episodes. Harris's first film role as an adult was Animal Room (1995), although he portrayed a teenager.

Harris played lead roles in numerous made-for-television features, including Snowbound: The Jim and Jennifer Stolpa Story (1994), My Ántonia (1995), The Christmas Wish (1998), Joan of Arc (1999), The Wedding Dress (2001), and The Christmas Blessing (2005). His film work also has included supporting roles in The Next Best Thing (2000), Undercover Brother (2002), and Starship Troopers (1997). Harris portrayed Mark Cohen in the 1997 touring company of the rock musical, Rent, a role he later satirized in the January 10, 2009, episode of Saturday Night Live which he hosted, and sang the role of Charles (initially played by Anthony Perkins in a 1966 ABC telecast) on the Nonesuch recording of Sondheim's Evening Primrose in 2001. Harris has also worked on Broadway in both musical and dramatic roles. He played Tobias Ragg in the 2001 concert performances of Sweeney Todd, and the following year, he performed in Proof. In 2003, he took the role of the Emcee in Cabaret. As a result of his critically acclaimed performance in Cabaret, Harris was named the top-drawing headliner in the role of the Emcee by GuestStarCasting.com.

=== 2004–2014 ===
In 2004, he performed the dual roles of the Balladeer and Lee Harvey Oswald on Broadway in the revival of Stephen Sondheim's musical Assassins. In 2004, Harris played a fictionalized, hyper-womanizing, lewd version of himself in Harold & Kumar Go to White Castle, a stoner comedy film in the Harold & Kumar series. Given the chance, Harris embraced the freedom from roles associated with his sanitized "Doogie Howser" character to the more unscrupulous and bawdy part in the Harold & Kumar franchise, which some have connected to his eventual casting as Barney Stinson in How I Met Your Mother the following year. He would go on to reprise the role in the sequels Harold & Kumar Escape from Guantanamo Bay (2008) and A Very Harold & Kumar 3D Christmas (2011). In 2005, Harris portrayed Jon in the London premiere of Tick, Tick... Boom! at the Menier Chocolate Factory. He was replaced by Christian Campbell in July of that same year.

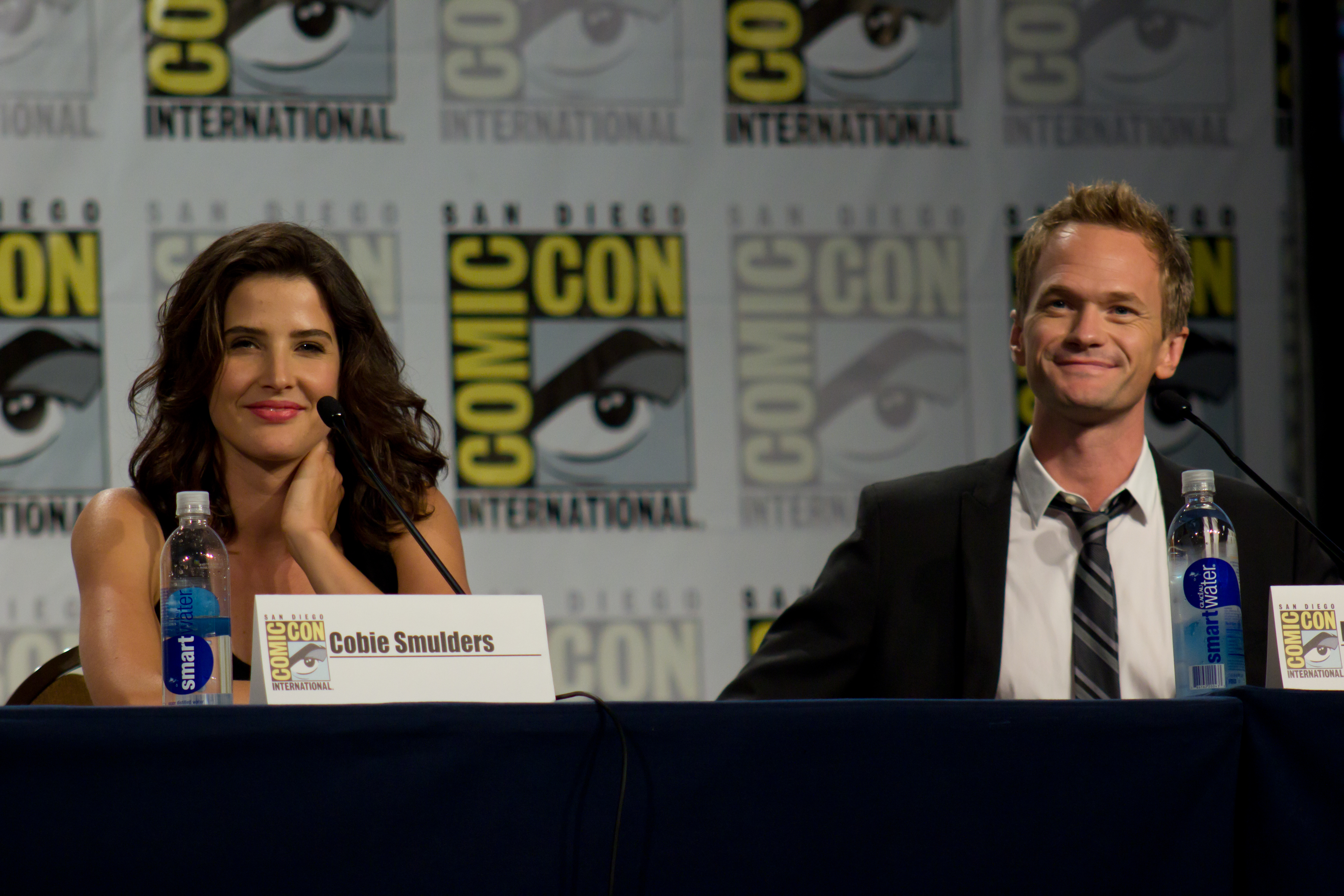
Cobie Smulders and Harris at San Diego Comic-Con for How I Met Your Mother in 2013

From 2005 to 2014, Harris played Barney Stinson, a serial womanizer, in the CBS ensemble sitcom How I Met Your Mother. The role earned him Emmy nominations every year from 2007 to 2010. In 2007, he worked with Mike Nelson on a comedic audio commentary set to the film Willy Wonka & the Chocolate Factory for RiffTrax. In 2008, Harris played the title role in Joss Whedon's musical web series Dr. Horrible's Sing-Along Blog. That same year, he guest-starred on Sesame Street as the Sesame Street Fairy Shoe Person. In 2009, he hosted the 7th Annual TV Land Awards and appeared as a guest judge on season 9 of American Idol. Harris provided the voice of Steve the Monkey in the Cloudy with a Chance of Meatballs film franchise (2009–2013). After a preview at San Diego Comic-Con, a musical episode of Batman: The Brave and the Bold featuring Harris as the villainous Music Meister premiered on October 23, 2009, on Cartoon Network. He has also provided his voice for the Disney California Adventure Park attraction California Screamin'.

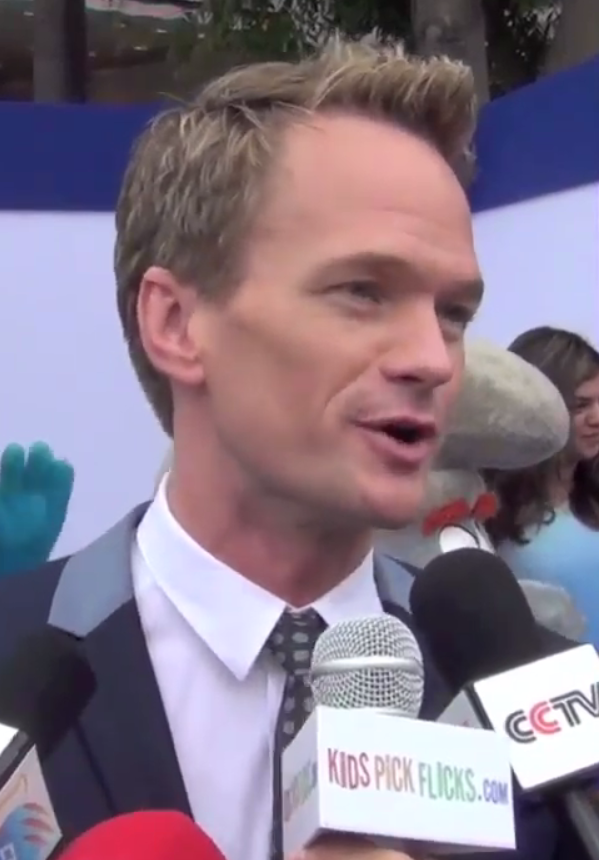
Harris at The Smurfs 2 premiere in 2013

Harris hosted the 61st Primetime Emmy Awards on September 20, 2009. On August 21, 2010, he won two Emmy Awards at the Creative Arts Emmy Awards ceremony, one of which was for his guest performance in the television series Glee. Harris hosted the 65th Primetime Emmy Awards on September 22, 2013, marking his second time hosting the event. Harris has hosted the Tony Awards four times: the 63rd Tony Awards on June 7, 2009, the 65th Tony Awards on June 12, 2011, the 66th Tony Awards on June 10, 2012, and the 67th Tony Awards on June 9, 2013. Only Dame Angela Lansbury, with five ceremonies, has hosted the Tony Awards more times. Hosting the Tony Awards has earned him four Primetime Emmy Awards in 2010, 2012, 2013 and 2014 for the 63rd, 65th, 66th and 67th, respectively.

Harris appeared in the 2010 Time 100 list of influential people. That year, Harris directed a Hollywood Bowl production of Rent; he cast his Beastly co-star Vanessa Hudgens as Mimi Márquez. Also in 2010, Harris provided voice acting for the role of the adult Dick Grayson (Nightwing) in the animated film Batman: Under the Red Hood and the beagle Lou in the film Cats & Dogs: The Revenge of Kitty Galore. On March 7, 2010, he delivered a musical number appearance at the 82nd Academy Awards. He played the lead in the indie comedy The Best and the Brightest. In December 2010, Harris hosted the Spike Video Game Awards. In 2011, Harris played the lead role of Bobby in Stephen Sondheim's Company with the New York Philharmonic in concert. That same year, he directed The Expert at the Card Table at Broad Stage's Edye in Santa Monica, California. He also starred in the 2011 film The Smurfs and its 2013 sequel The Smurfs 2. On Sept. 15, 2011, Harris received a star on the Hollywood Walk of Fame.

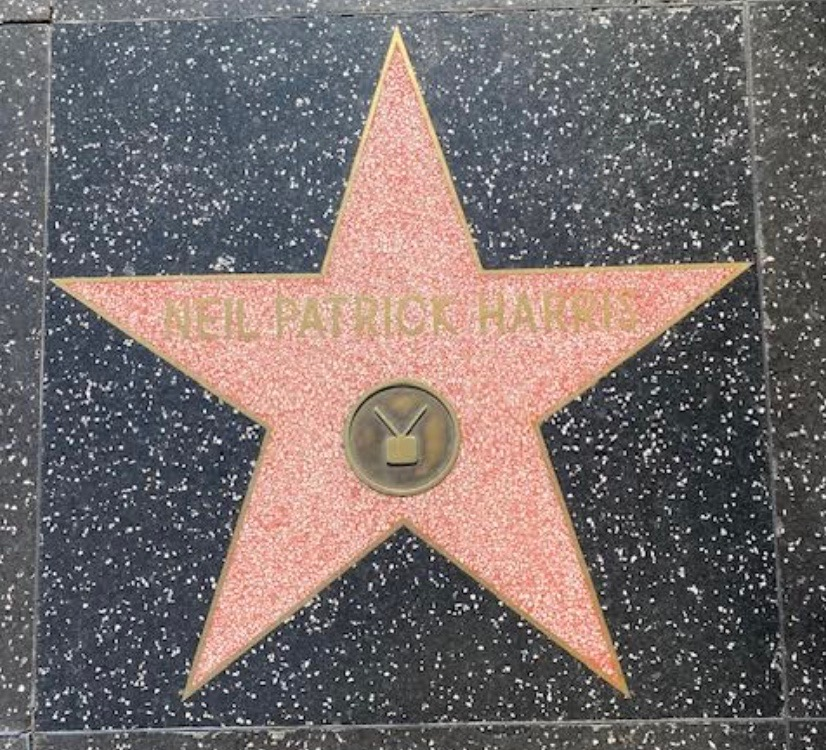
Harris's star on the Hollywood Walk of Fame

Harris portrayed the titular role in the first Broadway production of the rock musical Hedwig and the Angry Inch from March through August 2014. He received acclaim for the role, with Variety declaring, "It's astonishing how polished a physical performance Harris gives. Channeling his inner Rockette, along with Iggy Pop and Lou Reed by way of the Ramones, he carries off some advanced dance and acrobatic moves". The role earned Harris the 2014 Tony Award for Best Actor in a Musical. He exited the role on August 17, citing a desire to spend more time with his family. Later in 2014, Harris portrayed Desi Collings in Gone Girl, a film directed by David Fincher.

In 2014, Harris reportedly turned down the chance to replace David Letterman as host of the Late Show on CBS, stating that he feared he would get bored of the repetition that hosting a nightly talk show would entail. He also rejected the suggestion of replacing Craig Ferguson as host of The Late Late Show on the same grounds, although he later claimed he was never actually offered either job. In October 2014, Harris released a memoir titled Neil Patrick Harris: Choose Your Own Autobiography, which is structured like a Choose Your Own Adventure book. His autobiography spent two weeks on The New York Times Best Seller List.

=== 2015–present ===
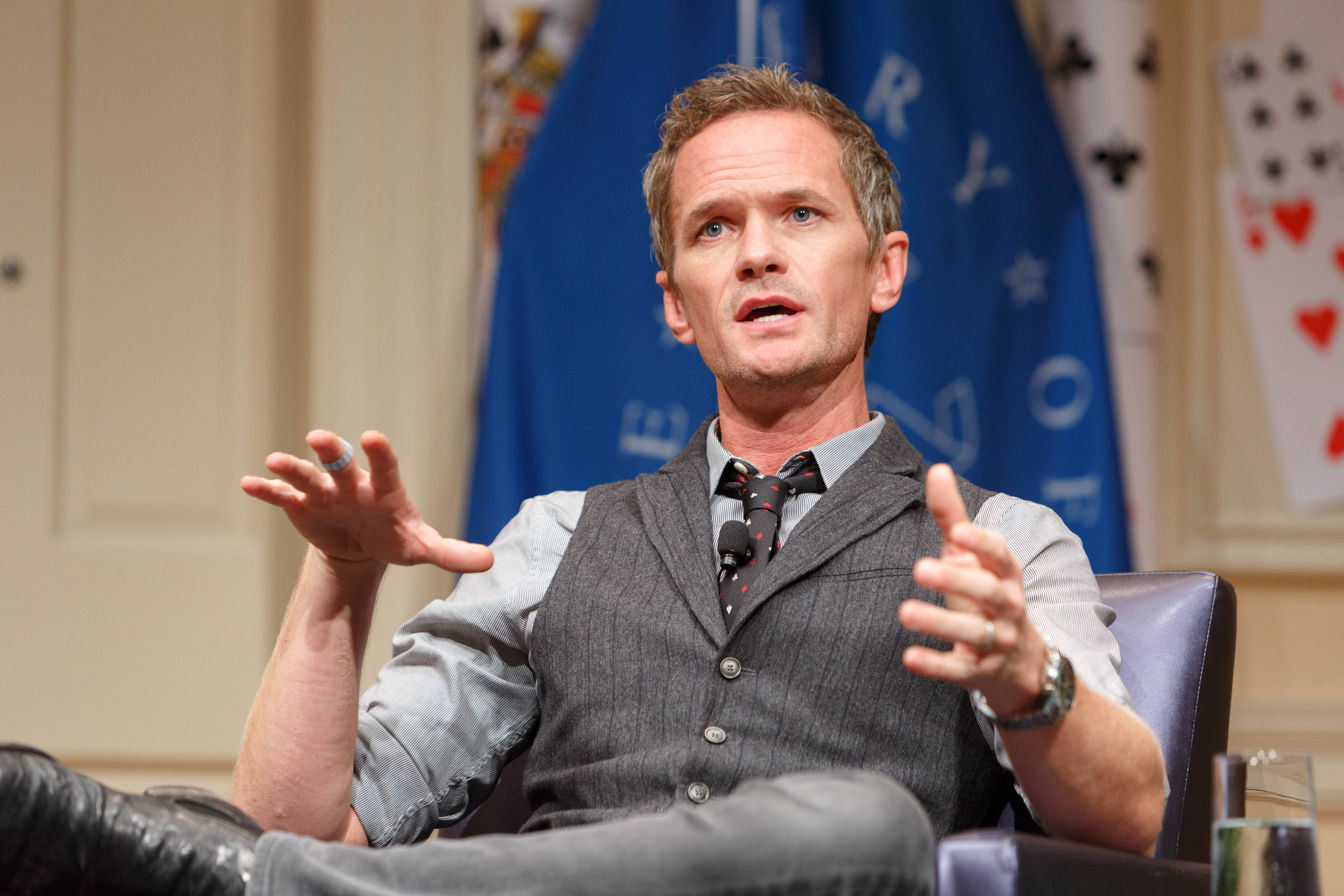
Harris at the National Book Festival in 2019

On February 22, 2015, he hosted the 87th Academy Awards. On September 15, 2015, Best Time Ever with Neil Patrick Harris, a variety series hosted and executive produced by Harris, premiered live on NBC and ran for eight episodes. He declined to appear in the fifth season of American Horror Story after appearing in the fourth in a guest role due to scheduling conflicts with Best Time Ever. On January 15, 2016, Harris was cast as Count Olaf in the television adaptation of A Series of Unfortunate Events. It ran for 3 seasons and 25 episodes on the streaming service Netflix before ending on January 1, 2019. On March 31, 2017, NBC picked up the game show Genius Junior with Harris as host and executive producer. The format would test teams of children, aged 12 and under, in various subjects including spelling, mathematics, and memory. The series received a 10-episode order and debuted on March 18, 2018. His debut young adult novel, The Magic Misfits, was released in November 2017 and is the first in a four-book series.

In October 2020, Harris released a single-player board game named Box One, produced by Theory11. As of February 2021, it is available exclusively through Target. Harris has been a frequent guest narrator at Disney's Candlelight Processional at Walt Disney World. In January 2021, Harris starred in the British drama series It's a Sin, broadcast on Channel 4 and HBO Max, depicting the 1980s HIV/AIDS epidemic in the United Kingdom. In June 2021, he was announced to be a judge on Australia's Got Talent: Challengers & Champions, a spin-off series of Australia's Got Talent. Harris appeared in The Matrix Resurrections, the fourth installment of the Matrix franchise, released in December 2021.

In 2022, he joined the Encores! presentation of Stephen Sondheim's Into the Woods as The Baker; the limited production ran at the New York City Center from May 4 to 15. Harris also starred in the 2022 Netflix series Uncoupled as gay Manhattanite Michael Lawson, a realtor re-navigating the dating scene after 17 years. He also portrayed Francis Beaumont in Peter Pan Goes Wrong for a limited engagement from April 11 to May 7, 2023. In December 2023, Harris guest starred as the Toymaker in the third and final special, "The Giggle", of the 60th anniversary specials of Doctor Who. On August 15, 2026, Harris hosted Horizons: A Carousel of Progress at Disney's D23 annual convention.

== Personal life ==
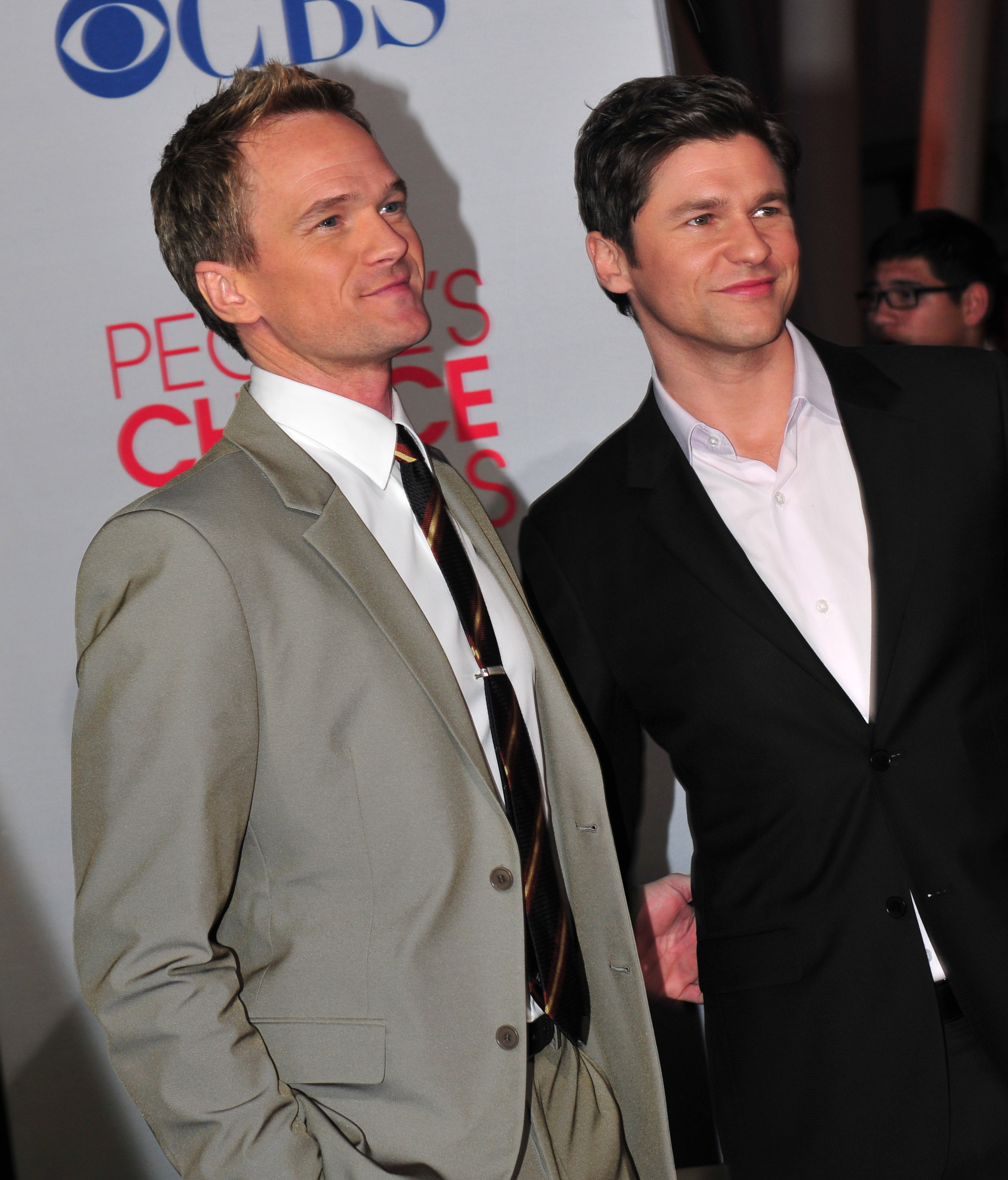
Harris with husband David Burtka at the 38th People's Choice Awards in 2012

From 1997 to 1998, Harris dated actress Christine Taylor. In a 2008 appearance on The Howard Stern Show, he discussed how the relationship made him realize his true sexuality: "She's the coolest, nicest chick ever. She's an absolute catch, and I thought, 'If I'm not going to feel the super sparks with her... it probably means I'm gay.'" Harris publicly came out as gay in November 2006, saying, "I am happy to dispel any rumors or misconceptions and am quite proud to say that I am a very content gay man living my life to the fullest and feel most fortunate to be working with wonderful people in the business I love." In 2019, he led the Tel Aviv Pride parade.

Harris has been in a relationship with actor and chef David Burtka since April 2004. In October 2010, they became parents to twins, son Gideon and daughter Harper, born via a surrogate mother. Following the passage of the Marriage Equality Act in New York on June 24, 2011, Harris and Burtka announced their engagement via Twitter, stating that they had proposed to each other five years earlier but kept the engagement secret until same-sex marriage became legal. Harris and Burtka married in Italy in September 2014. Pamela Fryman, the long-time director of How I Met Your Mother, officiated the wedding while Elton John performed at the reception. In 2013, the couple bought a townhouse in Harlem, which they sold in 2022 for $6.99 million.

Harris is a fan of magic, including card magic. His characters in How I Met Your Mother, American Horror Story: Freak Show, and Glee also use magic. Harris won the Tannen's Magic Louis Award in 2006 and hosted the 2008 World Magic Awards on October 11, 2008. He previously served as the president of the board of directors of Hollywood's Magic Castle, from 2011 to 2014. Additionally, Harris and Burtka were guests of honor for "Magic Chefs", a season 1 episode of Top Chef Masters, that took place at the Magic Castle. He also collaborated with the French-Swedish sportswear brand Ron Dorff on a fashion collection launched in September 2022. Fifteen percent of all proceeds were donated to World Central Kitchen.

In May 2022, it resurfaced on Twitter that Harris had hosted a Halloween party in October 2011 in which he served guests a meat platter designed to resemble the corpse of Amy Winehouse. He apologized later that month.

== Philanthropy ==
Harris has supported and contributed to various charities, organizations, and foundations. These include:

- AIDS Healthcare Foundation
- Alex's Lemonade Stand Foundation
- American Cancer Society
- Broadway Cares/Equity Fights AIDS
- Children International
- Clothes Off Our Back Foundation
- Elton John AIDS Foundation
- Entertainment Industry Foundation
- Feeding America
- First Book
- Food on Foot
- Global Green
- Hope North
- International Myeloma Foundation
- LeBron James Family Foundation
- Live Out Loud
- Los Angeles Mission
- Motion Picture and Television Fund Foundation
- Noreen Fraser Foundation
- Project Angel Food
- Real Medicine Foundation
- Stand Up To Cancer
- Susan G. Komen for the Cure
- The Trevor Project

In October 2014, Harris attended a dinner for the Elton John AIDS Foundation and in September 2016, he and his husband were the honorary hosts of a culinary cookout to help raise money for the Alex's Lemonade Stand Foundation. In April 2019, Harris hosted We Day California, a charity event that celebrates students who have made a change in their community.

== Discography ==
=== Cast recordings ===
Year	Album title	Notes
2001	Evening Primrose	Studio Cast
2004	Assassins	Revival Cast Recording
2006	Wall to Wall: Stephen Sondheim	Concert Cast
2008	Dr. Horrible's Sing-Along Blog	Original Cast Recording
2009	Batman: The Brave and the Bold – Mayhem of the Music Meister	Original Cast Recording
2014	Hedwig and the Angry Inch	Original Broadway Cast Recording

=== Singles ===
Year	Single	Peak chart positions					Sales	Album
Year	Single	AUS	CAN	IRE	UK	US	Sales	Album
2010	"Nothing Suits Me Like a Suit"	113	76	—	50	—	—	How I Met Your Mother season 5
2010	"Dream On" (featuring Matthew Morrison)	91	24	44	47	26	84,000 (US)	Glee: The Music, Volume 3 Showstoppers

== Acting credits ==
=== Film ===
Year	Title	Role	Notes
1988	Clara's Heart	David Hart	
1988	Purple People Eater	Billy Johnson	
1995	Animal Room	Arnold Mosk	
1997	Starship Troopers	Carl Jenkins	
1998	The Proposition	Roger Martin	
2000	The Next Best Thing	David	
2002	The Mesmerist	Benjamin	
2002	Undercover Brother	Lance	
2004	Harold & Kumar Go to White Castle	Neil Patrick Harris	
2005	The Golden Blaze	The Comic Shop Owner	Voice
2008	Harold & Kumar Escape from Guantanamo Bay	Neil Patrick Harris	
2008	Beyond All Boundaries	1st Lt. David Hettema	Voice, documentary
2008	Justice League: The New Frontier	Barry Allen / The Flash	Voice, direct-to-video
2009	Cloudy with a Chance of Meatballs	Steve the Monkey	Voice
2010	Cats & Dogs: The Revenge of Kitty Galore	Lou the Beagle	Voice
2010	The Best and the Brightest	Jeff	
2010	Batman: Under the Red Hood	Dick Grayson / Nightwing	Voice, direct-to-video
2011	Beastly	Will Fratalli	
2011	Company	Robert	Filmed production
2011	The Smurfs	Patrick Winslow	
2011	A Very Harold & Kumar Christmas	Neil Patrick Harris	
2011	The Muppets	Himself	Cameo
2012	American Reunion	Celebrity Dance-Off Host	Cameo
2013	The Smurfs 2	Patrick Winslow	
2013	Cloudy with a Chance of Meatballs 2	Steve the Monkey	Voice
2014	A Million Ways to Die in the West	Foy	
2014	Gone Girl	Desi Collings	
2017	Downsizing	Jeff Lonowski	
2019	Dads	Himself	Documentary film
2021	Coded	J. C. Leyendecker	Voice, short film
2021	8-Bit Christmas	Adult Jake Doyle	
2021	The Matrix Resurrections	The Analyst	
2022	The Unbearable Weight of Massive Talent	Richard Fink	
2022	Billion Dollar Babies: The True Story of the Cabbage Patch Kids	Narrator	Documentary film, also executive producer
2026	Sunny Dancer	Patrick	
2026	The Last Temptation of Becky	General Wilhelm Reuss	

=== Television ===
Year	Title	Role	Notes
1988	Too Good to Be True	Danny Harland	Television film
1989	Home Fires Burning	Lonnie Tibbits	Television film
1989	B.L. Stryker	Buder Campbell	Episode: "Blues for Buder"
1989	Cold Sassy Tree	Will Tweedy / Narrator	Television film
1989–1993	Doogie Howser, M.D.	Dr. Douglas "Doogie" Howser	97 episodes
1990	The Earth Day Special	Dr. Doogie Howser	Television film
1991	Carol & Company	Dr. Hoogie Dowser	Episode: "Suture Self"
1991	The Simpsons	Himself as Bart Simpson	Voice, episode: "Bart the Murderer"
1991	Stranger in the Family	Steve Thompson	Television film
1991	Blossom	Derek Slade	Episode: "Blossom – A Rockumentary"
1992	Capitol Critters	Max	Voice, 13 episodes
1992	Roseanne	Dr. Doogie Howser	Episode: "Less Is More"
1992	Where in the World Is Carmen Sandiego?	Himself	2 episodes
1992	Captain Planet and the Planeteers	Todd Andrews	Voice, episode: "A Formula for Hate"
1993	Quantum Leap	Mike Hammond	Episode: "Return of the Evil Leaper – October 8, 1956"
1993	Murder, She Wrote	Tommy Remsen	Episode: "Lone Witness"
1993	A Family Torn Apart	Brian Hannigan	Television film
1994	Snowbound: The Jim and Jennifer Stolpa Story	Jim Stolpa	Television film
1995	Not Our Son	Paul Kenneth Keller	Television film
1995	My Antonia	Jimmy Burden	Television film
1995	Legacy of Sin: The William Coit Story	William Coit	Television film
1995	The Man in the Attic	Edward Broder	Television film
1996	The Outer Limits	Howie Morrison	Episode: "From Within"
1997	Homicide: Life on the Street	Alan Schack	Episode: "Valentine's Day"
1997	The RuPaul Show	Himself	Episode: "Neil Patrick Harris"
1998	The Christmas Wish	Will Martin	Television film
1999	Joan of Arc	Charles VII	2 episodes
1999–2000	Stark Raving Mad	Henry McNeeley	22 episodes
2000	Will & Grace	Bill	Episode: "Girls, Interrupted"
2001	Static Shock	Johnny Morrow / Replay	Voice, episode: "Replay"
2001	Son of the Beach	Loverboy	Episode: "Queefer Madness"
2001	As Told by Ginger	Ned	Voice, episode: "Season of Caprice"
2001	The Legend of Tarzan	Moyo	Voice, 2 episodes
2001	The Wedding Dress	Travis Cleveland	Television film
2001	Ed	Joe Baxter	Episode: "Replacements"
2002	Touched by an Angel	Jonas	Episode: "The Princeless Bride"
2002	Justice League	Ray Thompson	Voice, 2 episodes
2003	Boomtown	Peter Corman	Episode: "Monster's Brawl"
2003	Spider-Man: The New Animated Series	Peter Parker / Spider-Man	Voice, 13 episodes
2004	Law & Order: Criminal Intent	John Tagman	Episode: "Want"
2005	Numb3rs	Ethan Burdick	Episode: "Prime Suspect"
2005	Jack & Bobby	Prof. Preston Phelps	Episode: "Querida Grace"
2005	The Christmas Blessing	Nathan Andrews	Television film
2005–2008	Mad TV	Himself	3 episodes
2005–2014	How I Met Your Mother	Barney Stinson	208 episodes; directed episode: "Jenkins"
2006	Me, Eloise	Philip	Voice, 2 episodes
2007–2009	Family Guy	Barney Stinson	Voice, 2 episodes
2008	Sesame Street	The Fairy Shoeperson / Himself	3 episodes
2009	Saturday Night Live	Himself (host)	Episode: "Neil Patrick Harris/Taylor Swift"
2009	Batman: The Brave and the Bold	Music Meister	Voice, episode: "Mayhem of the Music Meister!"
2009–2012	Robot Chicken	Various	Voice, 4 episodes
2009	7th Annual TV Land Awards	Himself (host)	Television special
2009	63rd Tony Awards	Himself (host)	Television special
2009	61st Primetime Emmy Awards	Himself (host)	Television special
2009	Yes, Virginia	Dr. Philip O'Hanlon	Voice, television special
2010	Through a Dog's Eyes	Narrator	Voice, television special
2010	Glee	Bryan Ryan	Episode: "Dream On"
2010–2015	The Penguins of Madagascar	Dr. Blowhole	Voice, 3 episodes
2010	2010 Spike Video Game Awards	Himself (host)	Television special
2011–2013	Adventure Time	Prince Gumball	Voice, 2 episodes
2011	Brain Games	Narrator	3 episodes
2011	65th Tony Awards	Himself (host)	Television special
2012	66th Tony Awards	Himself (host)	Television special
2013	67th Tony Awards	Himself (host)	Television special
2013	The Goodwin Games	—N/a	Director, episode: "The Box"
2013	65th Primetime Emmy Awards	Himself (host)	Television special
2014	RuPaul's Drag Race	Himself (guest judge)	Episode: "Drag My Wedding"
2015	American Horror Story: Freak Show	Chester Creb	2 episodes
2015	87th Academy Awards	Himself (host)	Television special
2015	Best Time Ever with Neil Patrick Harris	Himself (host)	8 episodes; also writer and executive producer
2017–2019	A Series of Unfortunate Events	Count Olaf	25 episodes; also producer (seasons 2–3)
2017	Mystery Science Theater 3000	Neville LaRoy	Episode: "Avalanche"
2017	At Home with Amy Sedaris	Himself	Episode: "Holidays"
2018	Lip Sync Battle	Himself	Episode: "A Michael Jackson Celebration"
2018	Genius Junior	Himself (host)	10 episodes; also executive producer
2019	Ghostwriter	The White Rabbit	Voice, 2 episodes
2020	Fraggle Rock: Rock On!	Himself	Episode: "Party Down in Fraggle Rock!"
2020	Home Movie: The Princess Bride	Westley	Episode: "Life Is Pain"
2021	It's a Sin	Henry Coltrane	Episode: "Episode 1"
2021	Eden	Zero	Voice, 4 episodes, English dub
2021	Star Wars: Visions	Karre	Voice, episode: "The Twins", English dub
2021	F Is for Family	Louis Chilson	Voice, 6 episodes
2022	Uncoupled	Michael Lawson	8 episodes; also executive producer
2023	How I Met Your Father	Barney Stinson	2 episodes
2023	Drag Me to Dinner	Himself (judge)	10 episodes; also executive producer
2023	Doctor Who	The Toymaker	Episode: "The Giggle"
2025	Dexter: Resurrection	Lowell Sloane / The Tattoo Collector	Episode: "Call Me Red"
2025	What's in the Box?	Himself (host)	6 episodes
2026	The Pigeon Show! Starring The Pigeon	The Bus Driver	Voice
2026	79th Tony Awards	Himself	Special appearance

=== Theater ===
Year	Title	Role	Notes	Venue	Ref.
1997	Rent	Mark Cohen	San Diego	La Jolla Playhouse	
1997–1998	Rent	Mark Cohen	National Tour	Various venues	
1998	Romeo and Juliet	Romeo Montague	San Diego	Old Globe Theatre	
1999	Sweeney Todd: The Demon Barber of Fleet Street	Tobias Ragg	Concert	Ahmanson Theatre	
2000	Sweeney Todd: The Demon Barber of Fleet Street	Tobias Ragg	Concert	New York Philharmonic	
2001	Sweeney Todd: The Demon Barber of Fleet Street	Tobias Ragg	Concert	San Francisco Symphony Orchestra	
2001	Sweeney Todd: The Demon Barber of Fleet Street	Tobias Ragg	Ravinia Festival		
2002	Proof	Hal Dobbs (replacement)	Broadway	Walter Kerr Theatre	
2003	Cabaret	The Emcee (replacement)	Broadway	Studio 54	
2004	Assassins	The Balladeer / Lee Harvey Oswald	Broadway	Studio 54	
2004–2005	The Paris Letter	Young Anton / Burt Sarris	Culver City	Kirk Douglas Theatre	
2005	Tick, Tick... Boom!	Jon	Off-West End	Menier Chocolate Factory	
2006	All My Sons	Chris Keller	Los Angeles	Geffen Playhouse	
2006	Amadeus	Wolfgang Amadeus Mozart	Los Angeles	Hollywood Bowl	
2010	Rent	Director only	Los Angeles	Hollywood Bowl	
2011	Company	Robert	Concert	New York Philharmonic	
2011	A Snow White Christmas	The Magic Mirror	North Hollywood	El Portal Theater	
2012	Assassins	The Balladeer / Lee Harvey Oswald	Reunion concert	Studio 54	
2014	Nothing to Hide	Director only	Off-Broadway	Romulus Linney Courtyard Theatre	
2014	Hedwig and the Angry Inch	Hedwig Robinson	Broadway	Belasco Theatre	
2022	Into the Woods	The Baker	Encores!	New York City Center	
2023	Peter Pan Goes Wrong	Francis Beaumont / Narrator	Broadway	Ethel Barrymore Theatre	
2023	Peter Pan Goes Wrong	Francis Beaumont / Narrator	Los Angeles	Ahmanson Theatre	
2023	Gutenberg! The Musical!	The Producer (one night cameo)	Broadway	James Earl Jones Theatre	
2024	Tick, Tick... Boom!	Director only	Concert	Kennedy Center	
2024	Shit. Meet. Fan.	Roger	Off-Broadway	MCC Theater	
2025	Art	Serge	Broadway	Music Box Theatre	
2027	Damn Yankees	Applegate	Broadway	Marquis Theater	

=== Web ===
Year	Title	Role	Notes
2008	Dr. Horrible's Sing-Along Blog	Dr. Horrible/Billy	3 episodes
2008	Prop 8: The Musical	A Very Smart Fellow	Short film
2012–2013	Neil's Puppet Dreams	Neil Patrick Harris	7 episodes; also co-creator, writer and executive producer

=== Video games ===
Year	Title	Role
2008	Saints Row 2	Veteran Child
2009	Eat Lead: The Return of Matt Hazard	Wallace "Wally" Wellesley
2010	Rock of the Dead	Main Character
2010	Spider-Man: Shattered Dimensions	Peter Parker / Spider-Man
2011	The Penguins of Madagascar: Dr. Blowhole Returns – Again!	Dr. Blowhole
2013	Saints Row IV	Veteran Child
2025	Marvel's Deadpool VR	Wade Wilson / Deadpool

== Bibliography ==
Year	Title	Publisher	ISBN
2014	Neil Patrick Harris: Choose Your Own Autobiography	Crown Archetype	978-0-385-34699-3
2017	The Magic Misfits	Little, Brown Books for Young Readers	978-0-316-39182-5
2019	The Magic Misfits: The Second Story	Little, Brown Books for Young Readers	978-0-316-39185-6
2020	The Magic Misfits: The Minor Third	Little, Brown Books for Young Readers	978-0-316-39188-7
2020	The Magic Misfits: The Fourth Suit	Little, Brown Books for Young Readers	978-0-316-39195-5

== Audiobooks ==
- 2014: Neil Patrick Harris: Choose Your Own Autobiography (read by the author), Random House Audio, ISBN 978-0-385-36794-3
