= Lisa Paulsen =

Entertainment industry leader

Lisa C. Paulsen is a former president and CEO of the Entertainment Industry Foundation, in the United States. She held the position for 27 years.

== Career ==
Pailsen began her career doing corporate communications at NBC. In June 1990, she became the president and CEO of Entertainment Industry Foundation, one of the largest nonprofit organizations in the United States entertainment industry.

In 2000, Katie Couric, shortly after losing her husband to color cancer, approached Paulson about working together to establish a partnership fighting the disease. The two founded the National Colorectal Cancer Research Alliance within the Entertainment Industry Foundation.

In 2008, Paulsen established Stand Up to Cancer, a flagship program by the Entertainment Industry Foundation. The program was co-founded by Paulsen and eight other co-founders, including Laura Ziskin, Noreen Fraser, Katie Couric, Sherry Lansing, Kathleen Lobb, Rusty Robertson, Sue Schwartz, and Ellen Ziffren.

The NonProfit Times’ Power & Influence Top 50 included Paulsen in 2009, 2010, and 2011. In 2012, she was in The Hollywood Reporter's Power 100 list of powerful female leaders in the entertainment industry.

In 2017, at the age of 61, Paulson stepped down from her position of president and CEO of the Entertainment Industry Foundation. She chose to transition into a different type of role, less focused on day-to-day executive and administrative tasks and more focused on development, fundraising, and talent relations. She remains heavily involved with Stand Up To Cancer.

== Personal life ==
Paulsen has two children. In 2007, her father and mother were both diagnosed with cancer in the same month. She is recreationally a glider pilot.
