= The Bridge of San Luis Rey (disambiguation) =

The Bridge of San Luis Rey is a 1927 novel by Thornton Wilder. The Bridge of San Luis Rey may also refer to:

== Art, products, entertainment, and media based on the novel ==
Films

- The Bridge of San Luis Rey (1929 film)
- The Bridge of San Luis Rey (1944 film)
- The Bridge of San Luis Rey (1958 television play)
- The Bridge of San Luis Rey (2004 film)

Opera

- Die Brücke von San Luis Rey: Szenen nach der Novelle von Thornton Wilder (1954), an opera by German composer Hermann Reutter

Plays

- The Bridge of San Luis Rey (2006), a play for puppets and actors, adapted by Greg Carter (theatre director) and directed by Sheila Daniels
