= Proof (play) =

American play

- Original language: English
- Written by: David Auburn
- Characters: Catherine; Robert; Hal; Claire
- Genre: Drama
- Setting: University of Chicago

Premiere
- Date: May 23, 2000
- Place: Manhattan Theatre Club

Proof is a play by the American playwright David Auburn. Proof was developed at George Street Playhouse in New Brunswick, New Jersey, during the 1999 Next Stage Series of new plays. The play premiered Off-Broadway in May 2000 and transferred to Broadway in October 2000. It won the 2001 Pulitzer Prize for Drama and the Tony Award for Best Play.

== Plot ==
The play focuses on Catherine, the daughter of Robert, a recently deceased mathematical genius in his fifties and professor at the University of Chicago, and her struggle with mathematical genius and mental illness. Catherine had cared for her father through a lengthy mental illness. Upon Robert's death, his ex-graduate student Hal discovers a paradigm-shifting proof about prime numbers in Robert's office. The title refers both to that proof and to the play's central question: Can Catherine prove the proof's authorship? Along with demonstrating the proof's authenticity, Catherine also finds herself in a relationship with Hal. Throughout, the play explores Catherine's fear of following in her father's footsteps, both mathematically and mentally and her desperate attempts to stay in control.

=== Act I ===
The play opens with Catherine sitting in the backyard of her large, old house. Robert, her father, reveals a bottle of champagne to help celebrate her 25th birthday. Catherine complains that she hasn't done any worthwhile work in the field of mathematics, at least not to the same level as her father, a well-known math genius. He reassures her that she can still do good work as long as she stops sleeping until noon and wasting time reading magazines. Catherine confesses she is worried about inheriting Robert's inclination towards mental instability. He begins to comfort her but then alludes to a "bad sign" when he points out that he did, in fact, die a week ago. Robert disappears as Catherine dozes off. She awakens when Hal, one of Robert's students, exits the house. He has been studying the hundreds of notebooks Robert left behind after his death, looking for any work that could be published. Catherine assures him that the notebooks are filled with scribbles and nonsense since her father wrote them when he was at his most delusional. Hal, attempting to flirt, invites her to go see his band later that night. Catherine becomes suspicious of him and demands to see what is in his backpack. She roots through it to find nothing but becomes infuriated when a notebook falls out of Hal's jacket. She dials the police while accusing him of trying to steal her father's work and pass it off as his own. He admits that he was sneaking it away but only to give it back to her later as a birthday present. He opens to a page that Robert wrote during a time when he was lucid. In it, Robert writes it is a "good day" and thanks to Catherine for taking care of him and expresses hope for the future. Hal leaves Catherine with the notebook. She begins to cry until she hears police sirens.

The next day Claire, Catherine's sister who just flew in from New York, is setting up brunch for them in the backyard. Catherine enters and Claire tries to goad her into idle chitchat as Catherine quietly seethes. Claire declares she is getting married and invites Catherine to stay with her and her fiance in New York. Catherine assures her she will come in January for the wedding, but Claire keeps pressing her to go earlier. When Catherine demands to know why Claire is inundating her with questions, Claire tells her the police came over earlier to check in on Catherine. Catherine admits to calling the police the previous night and tries to explain her altercation with Hal but only ends up sounding unhinged to the dubious Claire. Hal appears and asks to continue his work sorting the notebooks. Catherine lets him inside and Claire drops a hint for Catherine to try flirting with Hal by offering a bagel. Catherine storms into the house.

Later that night, after the funeral, Claire holds a party in the house for her friends as well as Hal and Robert's students. Catherine escapes to the porch where Hal finds her and offers her a beer. Hal confesses that he is not so sure about his own mathematical abilities since he considers math to be a "young man's game". Catherine tries to reassure him with a quote from Carl Friedrich Gauss. Hal responds by kissing her, much to Catherine's surprise. He apologizes for trying to steal the notebook and she apologizes for calling the police. They kiss again and Hal asks Catherine if she remembers meeting him years earlier. She says she does and recalls she thought he was "not boring". They continue to kiss.

The next morning Catherine sits outside. Hal exits the house and tells her he would like to spend the rest of the day with her. Catherine gives him a key to Robert's desk and tells him to look inside. He goes into the house. A moment later, Claire comes into the backyard, extremely hungover. Catherine, now in a good mood, tries to make nice with Claire. Claire takes the opportunity to continue to push Catherine to move to New York. Catherine asks why she should move to New York to which Claire confesses that she is selling the house. Catherine becomes enraged at the idea and she accuses Claire of abandoning her to take care of their sick father alone. Claire insists that the reason she did so was to keep working to pay for the house as well as Catherine's education. Catherine reveals that she had to quit school to tend to Robert and then accuses Claire of trying to have her committed. Claire admits that she has researched doctors and facilities for Catherine but insists that she was not planning on having her committed. In the middle of the row, Hal appears clutching a notebook, barely containing his excitement. He tells Claire that Catherine is in possession of one of Robert's notebooks which holds a very important proof. Claire asks Catherine where she found it and Catherine tells them she didn't find it—she wrote it.

=== Act II ===
Four years earlier, Robert sits in the backyard. Catherine tells him she thinks he is getting better and he agrees. She blurts out that she has decided to go to college in a couple months, funded by Claire, but promises she will be only a short drive away if he were to need her again. Robert protests and demands to know why she waited so long to tell him. When she points out that he hadn't been well until recently and was, at one point, trying to decode extraterrestrial messages in library books, he becomes upset. Hal interrupts, much to his embarrassment, to present his final dissertation to Robert. Robert assures him they will eventually work out the problem points together, then suddenly realizes he has forgotten Catherine's birthday. He apologizes and offers to take her out to dinner. Catherine invites Hal along but he says he can't go. Catherine shows Hal out and Robert sits down to write a notebook entry, declaring it to be the aforementioned "good day".

Resuming the end of the first act, Catherine declares she was the one who wrote the proof and is met with incredulity by both Hal and her sister. The handwriting is very much like Robert's and Hal questions Catherine's mathematical abilities given that she only had a few months' education at Northwestern. Catherine tells him that her real education was living with Robert. When Hal offers to show it to other math experts to confirm the authenticity of the proof, Catherine refuses. She tells Hal she trusted him and then accuses him of having no talent and being past his prime. Hal storms off and Catherine begins to rip the notebook apart. Claire gets it away from her and Catherine runs into the house.

The next morning, Hal attempts to visit Catherine and apologize for his behavior. Claire stops him to say Catherine won't talk to her, let alone Hal. Claire accuses him of sleeping with Catherine despite her being unstable. Hal argues that he had no bad intentions and insists Catherine is stronger than Claire thinks. He requests to have the notebook to verify its authenticity with fellow mathematicians. Claire gives it to him and tells him she is taking Catherine with her to New York the next day. She expresses concern for Catherine's future mental stability.

Almost four years earlier, Robert sits in the backyard, in the cold and writing furiously. Catherine enters and reprimands him for sitting in the cold with no jacket. Robert tells her it is too hot in the house and that the cold is better for helping him work. Catherine is shocked that he is working again and he assures her that he is sharper than ever. She is ecstatic that his previous mental instability has passed and asks to see his work. He says he would love for her to take a look and asks if she'd like to take time off school to work with him. Before she decides, Robert insists she look at his latest idea and thrusts a notebook into her hands. Catherine glances at it and becomes quiet. She tells him they need to go inside and Robert explodes with fury. He yells at her to read what he has written. She reads aloud, a nonsensical, rambling paragraph mathematically equating winter, books, and the cold. It is obvious that Robert's mind is deteriorating as it had been before. Catherine realizes Robert is descending into confusion and shivering uncontrollably. She tries to take him inside when he asks her not to leave. She promises she won't.

Four years later, Claire is in the backyard. Catherine enters with her suitcase. She asks Claire about life in New York. Claire mentions potential schools or jobs for Catherine, who is quick to mock her by making ridiculous demands for a Freudian psychiatrist who will listen as she blames all her problems on Claire. Claire leaves Catherine's plane ticket before storming off. Hal enters and tells Catherine that the proof checks out and apologizes for not believing her. Catherine tells him there is no proving that she wrote it and he can claim it as his own if he wants. Hal tells her he believes she is the one who wrote it and offers to read through it with her. Catherine admits she knows she is like her father but is terrified of becoming like her father. Hal reassures her that maybe she will be better. Catherine opens the proof and begins to talk through it with Hal.

== Characters ==
- Catherine – A young woman, 25 years old, who inherited much of her father's mathematical genius and, she fears, his "instability" as well; she gave up her life and schooling to take care of her father until his recent death.
- Claire – Catherine's older sister, a practical and business-minded woman who has been comfortably successful in her work and relationships. She left Robert and Catherine behind, distancing herself from the run-down family home of her youth to make a new life in New York City.
- Robert – A recently deceased mathematician praised for his groundbreaking work in his youth, but whose later years were plagued by delusional mental illness; he is seen in Catherine's imagination and in flashbacks.
- Harold (Hal) Dobbs – One of Robert's last Ph.D. students. He wishes to continue his mentor's legacy through his search through Robert's journals.

*The film establishes their last name as "Llewellyn" (the name of a book publisher focused on topics of body, mind and spirit). It is not stated in the play's script but sometimes used by newer productions.

== Production history ==
Originally produced by the Manhattan Theatre Club, opening on May 23, 2000, the play transferred to Broadway at the Walter Kerr Theatre on October 24, 2000. Directed by Daniel J. Sullivan, the production starred Mary-Louise Parker as Catherine, Johanna Day as Claire, Larry Bryggman as Robert, and Ben Shenkman as Hal. Later during the Broadway run, Jennifer Jason Leigh (September 13, 2001 to June 30, 2002) and Anne Heche (July 2, 2002 – January 5, 2003) took over the lead role. Josh Hamilton and Neil Patrick Harris subsequently played the role of Hal; and Len Cariou took over as Robert. Mary-Louise Parker won the Tony Award for her performance, and Daniel Sullivan won the Tony Award, Best Direction of a Play. The play closed on January 5, 2003, after 917 performances, making it the longest-running Broadway play of the 21st century.

Proof premiered in the West End at the Donmar Warehouse in May 2002, to June 15, 2002. Directed by John Madden, the cast starred Gwyneth Paltrow as Catherine, with Ronald Pickup as Robert, Sara Stewart as Claire, and Richard Coyle as Hal.

Proof premiered in Australia at the Sydney Opera House in 2003, starring Jacqueline Mckenzie as Catherine, Christina Eliason as Claire, Barry Otto as Robert, and Jonny Pasvolsky as Hal. It was directed by George Ogilvie as a Sydney Theatre Company production. The popular, sold-out run broke box office records and was extended.

London's Menier Chocolate Factory produced the play from March 13, 2013, to April 27, 2013. It featured Mariah Gale in the role of Catherine, and Polly Findlay directed.

In April and May 2013, a new production by the Whitmore Eclectic Theater Group opened in Los Angeles at the Hayworth Theatre for a limited run. James Whitmore Jr., son of the award-winning iconic actor James Whitmore, starred; and his daughter Aliah Whitmore directed.

A production in May 2013 opened at Carolina Actors Studio Theatre in Charlotte, North Carolina.

In September to October 2013, Proof was directed by Emily Mann at the McCarter Theatre in Princeton, New Jersey.

London's Tabard Theatre produced the play from 29 September to 24 October 2015, directed by Sebastien Blanc (son of Raymond Blanc). It featured Tim Hardy (Royal Shakespeare Company Marat/Sade) as Robert, Julia Papp as Catherine, Mary-Ann Cafferkey as Claire and Ian Charleson Awards nominee Kim Hardy as Hal.

A Seattle production opened in January 2017 at Strawberry Theatre Workshop with three TPS Gregory Award-winning actors, Anastasia Higham, Charles Leggett, and Allison Standley in principal roles. Proof was directed by Greg Carter on the Mainstage at 12th Ave Arts. It was the first professional production in Seattle since 2004.

Spring Green, Wisconsin’s American Players Theater produced the play from 26 October to 19 November 2023, directed by APT Artistic Director Brenda DeVita (wife of actor and director James DeVita). It featured Kelsey Brennan as Catherine, David Daniel as Robert, Nate Burger as Hal, and Laura Rook as Claire.

On August 20, 2025, it was announced that Proof would receive its first Broadway revival. The production starred Ayo Edebiri and Don Cheadle and was directed by Thomas Kail. On November 6, 2025, the production announced the casting of Samira Wiley and Jin Ha in the roles of Claire and Hal. On March 17, 2026, the production announced Kara Young would play Claire, as Wiley had withdrawn due to medical reasons. Previews started March 21, 2026 and it opened on April 16, 2026 at the Booth Theatre. Adrienne Warren joined the cast as Claire on June 30 for the remainder of the run. The Broadway revival finished its run on July 19, 2026, with the final week at full capacity (standing room only).

== Cast and characters ==
Character	Off-Broadway	Broadway	London	Australia	Broadway Revival
Character	2000		2002	2003	2026
Catherine	Mary-Louise Parker	Mary-Louise Parker	Gwyneth Paltrow	Jacqueline McKenzie	Ayo Edebiri
Claire	Johanna Day	Johanna Day	Sara Stewart	Christina Eliason	Kara Young
Robert	Larry Bryggman	Larry Bryggman	Ronald Pickup	Barry Otto	Don Cheadle
Hal	Ben Shenkman	Ben Shenkman	Richard Coyle	Jonny Pasvolsky	Jin Ha

== Film adaptation ==
A 2005 film adaptation was directed by John Madden, starring Gwyneth Paltrow as Catherine, along with Anthony Hopkins, Hope Davis, and Jake Gyllenhaal. Adapted by Rebecca Miller, the film version added more characters (in minor supporting roles), whereas the play has only four.

== Awards and nominations ==
=== Original Broadway production ===
Year	Award ceremony	Category	Nominee	Result
2001	Drama Desk Award	Outstanding Play		Won
2001	Drama Desk Award	Outstanding Actress in a Play	Mary-Louise Parker	Won
2001	Lucille Lortel Award	Outstanding Play		Won
2001	New York Drama Critics' Circle Award	Best American Play		Won
2001	Pulitzer Prize	Drama		Won
2001	Tony Award	Best Play		Won
2001	Tony Award	Best Actress in a Play	Mary-Louise Parker	Won
2001	Tony Award	Best Featured Actor in a Play	Larry Bryggman	Nominated
2001	Tony Award	Best Featured Actor in a Play	Ben Shenkman	Nominated
2001	Tony Award	Best Featured Actress in a Play	Johanna Day	Nominated
2001	Tony Award	Best Direction of a Play	Daniel Sullivan	Won

=== 2026 Broadway revival ===
Year	Award ceremony	Category	Nominee	Result
2026	Drama League Awards	Outstanding Revival of a Play		Nominated
2026	Drama League Awards	Distinguished Performance	Ayo Edebiri	Nominated
2026	Drama League Awards	Distinguished Performance	Kara Young	Nominated
