= Prediction Productions =

- Founded: March 8, 2013 (as Prediction Productions, Inc.)
- Headquarters: United States
- Key people: Neil Patrick Harris
- Website: www.predictionproductions.com

Prediction Productions is Neil Patrick Harris' production company. It also was one of the production companies involved with Best Time Ever with Neil Patrick Harris. Harris has a deal with NBC to work on new projects through Prediction Productions as well.
