= Strawberry Theatre Workshop =

- Interactive map of Strawberry Theatre Workshop
- Location: Washington
- Coordinates: 47°36′53″N 122°19′19″W

Strawberry Theatre Workshop (a.k.a. Strawshop) is a Seattle theatre company founded in 2003 by Greg Carter, associated with a movement in that city to improve wages for professional theatre artists. Its name "is derived from the Strawberry Fields of popular music, and the Beatles, who used their recording studio as a daily laboratory of expression."

== History ==
Strawshop performed seven plays at the Richard Hugo House from 2004 to 2006, before moving to the Lee Center for the Arts at Seattle University, and eventually to the Erickson Theatre Off Broadway on Capitol Hill, where they have performed a summer season since 2008. In January 2015, Strawshop began performing in a new arts space developed by Capitol Hill Housing called 12th Avenue Arts. Strawshop is designing and managing the new venue in a partnership with New Century Theatre Company and Washington Ensemble Theatre.

In its inaugural season, Strawshop presented an original play for puppets and actors derived from the writing, drawing, and music of American folk artist Woody Guthrie called This Land. The show was created by Carter at In the Heart of the Beast Puppet and Mask Theatre in Minneapolis in 1993. This Land is one of two puppet plays produced by Strawshop during its time at Hugo House, the other being a premiere adaptation of Thornton Wilder’s novel, The Bridge of San Luis Rey. Both puppet plays were supported by grants from the Puppeteers of America, and Bridge gained additional funding from the Jim Henson Foundation.

In an effort to be genre-breaking, Strawshop has produced two narrative theatre plays, two plays for puppets, three musicals, one original play, and a West Coast premiere (Gutenberg! The Musical!), in addition to work from a more traditional canon of Ibsen, Miller, Fo, Brecht, and Mamet. Between 2008 and 2010, the company featured a series of plays about real people called Biograph that included Life of Galileo, The Elephant Man, and Lady Day at Emerson’s Bar & Grill. The series concluded in 2010 with productions of The Laramie Project and Breaking the Code, though historical/biographical work (such as Inherit the Wind and The Normal Heart) have continued to be featured. Likewise, Strawshop has championed gay drama (Laramie, Code, Normal, as well as Prelude to a Kiss and Take Me Out) without adopting that genre as its exclusive mission. The 2017/18 season focussed entirely on the work of women: two plays with all-female casts—including a non-traditional casting of Peter Morgan's Frost/Nixon—followed by Paula Vogel's How I Learned to Drive.

Strawshop has no formal relationship with Cornish College of the Arts, though two of the founding Board Members (Carter and Rhonda J Soikowski) were employed there, and dozens of Cornish faculty, staff, and alumni have appeared on the Strawshop stage or worked in design/production positions.

== Critical reception ==
In 2007, Strawshop received The Stranger newspaper's Genius Award for an Organization—a prize awarded in other years to On the Boards, Pacific Northwest Ballet, and the Frye Art Museum. Actors associated with Strawshop have won Genius Awards as Individual Artists in Theatre including Gabriel Baron (2005), and Amy Thone (2007). Composer/designer John Osebold—who designed The Laramie Project at Strawshop—was the Stranger Theatre Genius in 2012. The award is given to only one person or individual in each category every year.

In 2006, actor Todd Jefferson Moore was the Gregory A Falls Award for Career Achievement, shortly after appearing in Strawshop's Fellow Passengers (a three-actor narrative performance of Dickens’ A Christmas Carol), which he cited as a favorite role.

The Seattle Times critic Misha Berson has named Strawshop winners of several Footlight Awards, including best performance by Amy Thone (2008), Felicia Loud (2009), and Bradford Farwell (2010). Footlights for best play were given for Accidental Death of an Anarchist (2005), Leni (2008), The Elephant Man (2009), Breaking the Code (2010), The Bells (2012), The Normal Heart (2014), and Our Town (2015). The Times retired the awards after 2015.

Since 2013, Seattle Theatre Writers have nominated Strawshop productions and artists in multiple categories for the Gypsy Rose Lee Awards. In 2014, actor Greg Lyle-Newton won the award for Excellence in Performance for The Normal Heart. In 2017, Lydia won Gypsies for director Sheila Daniels, designer Reed Nakayama, and performers Sofiá Raquel Sánchez and Andrew Pryor-Ramírez.

The company was nominated in five of six categories in the inaugural Gregory Awards hosted by Theatre Puget Sound in 2009. Don Darryl Rivera was the winner as Person to Watch, having created music for Strawshop's The Elephant Man and Gutenberg! The Musical!. In 2012, Strawshop became the only theatre in Seattle nominated for a Gregory Award for Outstanding Production four years in a row: The Elephant Man (2009), The Laramie Project (2010), Breaking the Code (2011), and Accidental Death of an Anarchist (2012). This recognition was made more remarkable by the fact that Strawshop only produced nine plays during the four years considered. Strawshop artists Robertson Witmer (sound), Andrew Smith (lighting), Brendan Patrick Hogan (sound), and Sheila Daniels (directing) are individual TPS Gregory Award winners. Amy Thone (The Normal Heart) won the Gregory as a Supporting Actor in 2014. Strawshop received additional nominations for Outstanding Production in 2015 (Our Town), 2017 (Lydia), and 2018 (Frost/Nixon).

== Productions ==
Richard Hugo House

- This Land: Woody Guthrie directed by Greg Carter (Sep/04)
- Fellow Passengers directed by Rhonda J Soikowski (Dec/04)
- Accidental Death of an Anarchist directed by Gabriel Baron (Sep/05)
- Fellow Passengers (remount) directed by Julie Beckman (Dec/05)
- The Bridge of San Luis Rey directed by Sheila Daniels (Sep/06)
- An Enemy of the People directed by Greg Carter (Jan/07)
- The Water Engine directed by MJ Sieber (Mar/07)

Lee Center for the Arts

- Life of Galileo directed by Rosa Joshi (Oct/07)
- The Douglas Paasch Puppet Playhouse (Sep/13)

Erickson Theatre Off Broadway

- Leni directed by Rhonda J Soikowski (Jul/08)
- Gutenberg! The Musical! directed by Greg Carter (Sep/08)
- The Elephant Man directed by Julie Beckman (Jul/09)
- Lady Day at Emerson's Bar & Grill directed by MJ Sieber (Sep/09)
- The Laramie Project directed by Greg Carter (Jul/10)
- Breaking the Code directed by Sheila Daniels (Sep/10)
- Cloud Nine directed by Nick Garrison (Jul/11)
- Inherit the Wind directed by Greg Carter (Sep/11)
- The Bells directed by Julie Beckman (Jan/12)
- Accidental Death of an Anarchist directed by Gabriel Baron (Jul/12)
- This Land: Woody Guthrie directed by Greg Carter (Sep/12)
- The Normal Heart directed by Sheila Daniels (Jan/14)
- Black Comedy directed by Kelly Kitchens (Aug/14)

Town Hall Seattle

- Control: A Living Newspaper directed by Greg Carter (May/14)

12th Ave Arts

- Our Town directed by Greg Carter (Jan/15)
- The Memorandum directed by Paul Morgan Stetler (Sep/15)
- The Birds directed by Greg Carter (Jan/16)
- 9 Circles directed by Greg Carter (Jun/16)
- Rhinoceros directed by Jess K Smith (Sep/16)
- Proof directed by Greg Carter (Jan/17)
- Lydia directed by Sheila Daniels (Jun/17)
- Why We Have a Body directed by Rhonda J Soikowski (Sep/17)
- Frost/Nixon directed by Greg Carter (Jan/18)
- How I Learned to Drive directed by Ryan Purcell (Jun/18)
- Prelude to a Kiss directed by Greg Carter (Sep/18)
- Everybody directed by Kaytlin McIntyre (Jan/19)
- Take Me Out directed by Greg Carter (May/19)
- The Pavilion directed by Greg Carter (Oct/19)
- Our Country's Good directed by Leah Adcock-Starr (Jan/20)
