= XL (novel) =

2020 young adult novel

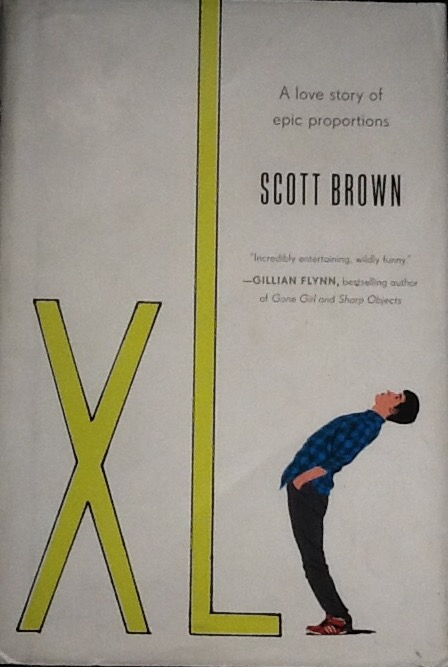
- Author: Scott Brown
- Cover artist: Paul Blow
- Language: English
- Genre: Young Adult
- Publisher: Knopf
- Publication date: April 2, 2020
- Publication place: United States of America
- Media type: Print (Hardcover)
- Pages: 314 first edition
- ISBN: 978-1-5247-6624-5

XL is a novel by Scott Brown. It features Will Daughtry, a high school student living near San Diego, California.

The novel is set in a fictional neighborhood called Poca Resaca, in California.

== Plot summary ==
The book is written in first-person, from the point of view of the main character, Will Daughtry.

Part One, "Hobbit", opens with Will's birthday, something he is dreading. Will is turning 16, and he is just under 5 feet. Will's growth was stunted from an early age, and he feels doomed to shortness forever. he celebrates his birthday, hangs out with friends, gets a present from one of his best friends (Monica). The present is a One Ring replica. He also gets a car, a Fiat Ovum, in orbital blue. There is an important basketball game in which is stepbrother is playing. His stepbrother, "The Spesh", Andrew Tannenger, is the team's star player. After the game (which they win), Drew gets taken to a mansion where one of the popular kids lives. Will, coming to pick him up, notices Drew and Monica making out, therefore breaking one of the unspoken rules of their friendship.

Part Two, "Man", opens with Will finding out that he's grown two inches in less than a month. After having learned this, he tells his parents, who are shocked. He then goes to his doctor, Dr. Helman, who is puzzled. She thinks it may be cancer, but this is ruled out. He grows more, and becomes an internet celebrity, because of a timelapse GIF his friend Roderick Raftsman Rhinehardt Royall (Rafty) made. The GIF shows photos of him next to his Fiat for 90 days, getting taller.

Part Three, "Leviathan", is named for a book that Monica reads throughout the book. It opens with a thread of messages between him and [jack], an online troll who has chosen to target him because of his popularity. Then it cuts to Game Day, a championship game. After that, he confronts [jack], they talk, and [jack] goes into therapy. [jack] is revealed to be Ethan Neville, the yearbook photographer.

The plot reaches a climax when, at the Lowlands (a gorilla habitat where Will is interning), the three friends have a meeting. Eventually, things break down, though, and Will almost punches Drew. Monica hooks his arm, and his momentum (he is mid swing) pulls her down has he is as well. She gets injured, and goes to the hospital. She then checks herself out, and goes to the beach. The two find her there, preparing to surf the legendary Sawtooth, a killer wave. In the end, she succeeds, and they all make up, and they're inseparable again.

== Characters ==
Main

- Will Daughtry
- Monica Bailarin
- Andrew "Drew" Tannenger
- Brian Daughtry
- Laura Tannenger
- Rodrick "Rafty" Raftsman Rhinehardt Royall

Side

- Dr. Helman
- Spencer Inskip
- Sidney Lim
- Ethan Neville
- Jaylen "Jazzy" Teixiera
- Coach Guthridge
- Coach Whatley
- Will's mom
- Drew's dad

== Reviews ==
- School Library Journal
- Kirkus Reviews
- Bulletin of the Center for Children's Books
- Common Sense Media
