= Fellow Passengers =

Play written by Greg Carter

Fellow Passengers is a three-actor narrative theatre adaptation of Charles Dickens' 1843 novella A Christmas Carol, written by Greg Carter. The title is derived from a first-scene speech by Fred, the nephew of Ebenezer Scrooge, who says: "I have always thought of Christmas time, when it has come round... as a good time: a kind, forgiving, charitable, pleasant time: the only time I know of, in the long calendar of the year, when men and women seem by one consent to open their shut-up hearts freely, and to think of people below them as if they really were fellow passengers to the grave, and not another race of creatures bound on other journeys."

Passengers opened at Strawberry Theatre Workshop in Seattle, Washington in December, 2004. The original director was Rhonda J Soikowski, and the acting ensemble was Todd Jefferson Moore, Gabriel Baron, and Marty Mukhalian.

== Plot ==
Fellow Passengers uses nearly every word of the original Dickens novella activated by the cast as narrative theatre. The purpose is to restore the satire and political comment omitted from more common dramatic adaptations of the story. Three actors (including one woman) rotate into the role of Scrooge. In the original production, the play was set in an attic with found objects taking the place of many characters: a broken stool played Tiny Tim, a lantern stood in for the Ghost of Christmas Past, a large double-bass trunk represented the Ghost of Christmas Future.

== Critical reception ==
"At this time of year, when Dickens' story has such particular resonance, this evocative, thoughtfully realized production is bound to elicit as much surprise as delight. For those who think they know A Christmas Carol so well that there's no need for further exposure, Fellow Passengers is a refreshing and vital reintroduction to Dickens' masterpiece." ––Chris Comte

"In Fellow Passengers playwright Greg Carter has brought the story back to life more certainly than the ghost of Jacob Marley, and he uses that renewed vitality to return us to something much closer to Dickens. In the place of the usual sweet sentimentality and festive affirmation of good spirits and merrymaking, this superb production gives us a real ghost story, fearsome in its threat and uncompromising in its moral imperative... Make no mistake, these are three actors working at the top of their game, in a show that allows them to do everything that live theatre is uniquely capable of doing..." ––Jerry Kraft

"A bracing, absorbing, three-actor version of A Christmas Carol that emphasizes the moral behind the story: that Yuletide is a time to reclaim one's sense of compassion for others less fortunate than oneself." ––Misha Berson

"Mukhalian, Smith and Moore trade-off stints of playing Scrooge in Fellow Passengers, a spare but in some ways spectacular version of Charles Dickens' 1843 story A Christmas Carol. What the show lacks in impressive costumes, settings and crowd scenes it makes up for in inspired acting. The performers showcase Dickens' humane insights and witty writing." ––Joe Adcock

== See also ==
- Adaptations of A Christmas Carol
