= Laura Ziskin =

American film and television producer (1950–2011)

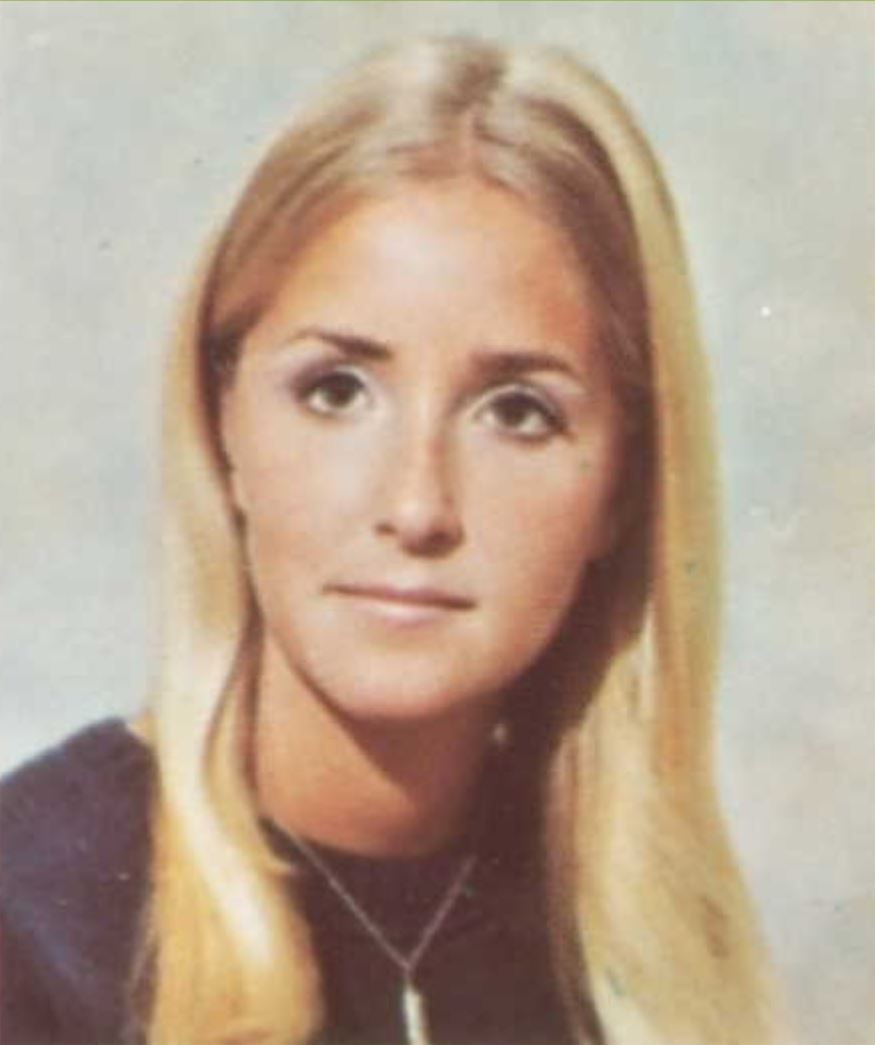
- Ziskin, c. 1968
- Born: Laura Ellen Ziskin; March 3, 1950; San Fernando Valley, California, U.S.
- Died: June 12, 2011 (aged 61); Santa Monica, California, U.S.
- Education: USC School of Cinematic Arts
- Occupation: Film producer
- Years active: 1976–2011
- Spouses: Julian Barry (m. 1978, divorced) Alvin Sargent (m. 2010)
- Children: 1

Laura Ellen Ziskin (March 3, 1950 – June 12, 2011) was an American film producer. She was an executive producer of Pretty Woman (1990) and a producer of Spider-Man (2002), Spider-Man 2 (2004), Spider-Man 3 (2007), and The Amazing Spider-Man (2012; posthumous credit).

She was the first woman to produce the Academy Awards telecast alone, producing the 74th Academy Awards (2002) and the 79th Academy Awards (2007).

== Early life and education ==
Ziskin was born and raised in a Russian-Jewish family in the San Fernando Valley, California, the daughter of Jay Ziskin and Elaine Edelman. Her father was a psychologist and lawyer who died of prostate cancer, aged 77, on June 14, 1997.

After graduating from the USC School of Cinematic Arts in 1973, Ziskin began by writing material for game shows and then became the personal assistant of Jon Peters. Ziskin quickly became a development executive, moving into feature films with Jon Peters' production company, where she worked on the remake of A Star Is Born (1976), starring Barbra Streisand. She was the associate producer of The Eyes of Laura Mars (1978).

== Career ==
=== Fogwood Films and as an independent producer ===
Ziskin formed Fogwood Films with partner Sally Field in 1984, and produced Murphy's Romance (1985). As an independent producer, Ziskin produced the thriller No Way Out (1987) for Orion Pictures. Ziskin and partner Ian Sander produced two films featuring Dennis Quaid, the 1988 remake of D.O.A., and Taylor Hackford's Everybody's All-American (also 1988).

=== Touchstone Pictures ===
Ziskin's largest success came with the release of the comedy Pretty Woman (1990), starring Julia Roberts and Richard Gere, on which Ziskin served as executive producer for Touchstone Pictures. Ziskin's next project, What About Bob? (1991), proved stressful. She and star Bill Murray had spirited disagreements during production, which involved Murray pushing her into a lake and breaking her sunglasses. During the time, she left Disney in 1990 to join The Guber-Peters Entertainment Company, an affiliate of Columbia Pictures, as Ziskin was a longtime close friend of Jon Peters.

Neither that film nor The Doctor (also 1991) were anywhere near as strong at the box-office as Pretty Woman. A switch to Columbia resulted in Stephen Frears' Hero (1992), a loose remake of Meet John Doe (1941), for which Ziskin both produced and supplied the story. Ziskin directed her first short film Oh, What a Day! 1914, which was released in 1994, and produced the Nicole Kidman tour-de-force To Die For (1995), under the banner of Laura Ziskin Productions.

=== Fox 2000 ===
Ziskin was appointed president of Fox 2000 in 1994, a newly created division of 20th Century Fox.

Among the films released were Edward Zwick's Gulf War drama Courage Under Fire (1996), the romantic comedy One Fine Day (1996), Pat O'Connor's Inventing the Abbotts (1997), and the big-budget disaster film Volcano (1997). Ziskin and Tom Rothman helped develop the script for The English Patient (1996) before studio head Bill Mechanic returned the rights to director Anthony Minghella, who then got it produced and distributed through Miramax Films.

Ziskin executive produced As Good as It Gets (1997). The film received seven Academy Award nominations, including Best Picture. Its stars, Jack Nicholson and Helen Hunt, received the leading role Oscars in the acting categories.

=== Columbia Pictures ===
After nearly five years in the same job, Ziskin resigned from Fox 2000 in November 1999 and within a month had a production deal at Columbia Pictures.

After serving as the first solo female producer of an Academy Awards telecast in 2002, Ziskin returned to the big screen with the feature version of Spider-Man (2002). The film was released in early May to widespread acclaim from critics and became the highest-grossing film of its year. The success of the film led to two sequels, Spider-Man 2 (2004) and Spider-Man 3 (2007).

In 2002, Ziskin was awarded the Crystal Award by Women in Film for her efforts at expanding the role of women in the entertainment industry.

== Activism ==
In February 2004, Ziskin was diagnosed with stage 3 breast cancer, a disease doctors had repeatedly missed previously because of the diffuse type of cancer she had.

On May 28, 2008, Ziskin, along with Katie Couric, Sherry Lansing, the Entertainment Industry Foundation, the Noreen Fraser Foundation, and Ellen Ziffren, created the charitable organization Stand Up to Cancer.

== Personal life ==
When she was about 27, Ziskin married writer Julian Barry, relocating to Connecticut to help him raise his three children from a previous marriage. The couple later had a daughter, Julia Barry. Ziskin was married to writer Alvin Sargent from 2010 until her death in 2011 from complications of breast cancer.

== Death ==
Ziskin died of breast cancer at her home in Santa Monica, California, on June 12, 2011, aged 61. Her final films were the franchise reboot, The Amazing Spider-Man (2012) and The Butler (2013). She died a few weeks after principal filming ended on The Amazing Spider-Man but three weeks before filming began on The Butler.

In 2012, the Athena Film Festival created an award to be given in her honor: The Laura Ziskin Lifetime Achievement Award is given annually to a woman in the film industry whose leadership demonstrates vision and courage and sets a standard for other women to emulate.

== Filmography as producer and executive producer ==
She was a producer in all films unless otherwise noted.

=== Film ===
Year	Film	Credit	Notes
1978	Eyes of Laura Mars	Associate producer	
1985	Murphy's Romance		
1987	No Way Out		
1988	D.O.A.		
1988	The Rescue		
1988	Everybody's All-American		
1990	Pretty Woman	Executive producer	
1991	What About Bob?		
1991	The Doctor		
1992	Hero		
1995	To Die For		
1997	As Good as It Gets	Executive producer	
2002	Spider-Man		
2004	Spider-Man 2		
2005	Stealth		
2007	Spider-Man 3		
2012	The Amazing Spider-Man		Posthumous credit
2013	The Butler		Posthumous credit

As writer

Year	Film
1991	What About Bob?
1992	Hero

Miscellaneous crew

Year	Film	Role
1976	A Star Is Born	Assistant: Jon Peters

Thanks

Year	Film	Role
2008	Killshot	Thanks
2012	Lay the Favorite	For
2012	The Amazing Spider-Man	In memory of
2013	The Butler	In memory of
2016	Creedmoria	Special thanks

=== Television ===
Year	Title	Credit	Notes
1983	One Cooks, the Other Doesn't		Television film
2000	Fail Safe		Television film
2001	Dinner with Friends	Executive producer	Television film
2001	How I Learned to Drive		Television film
2002	74th Academy Awards	Executive producer	Television special
2003	Tarzan	Executive producer	
2007	79th Academy Awards	Executive producer	Television special
2008−10	Stand Up to Cancer	Executive producer	Television special
2015	Cancer	Executive producer	Documentary

As writer

Year	Title	Notes
2008	Stand Up to Cancer	Television special

Miscellaneous crew

Year	Title	Role	Notes
1977	Minstrel Man	Assistant to the producers	Television film
