= Ron Dorff =

French-Swedish sportswear brand

- Founder: Claus Lindorff
- Headquarters: Paris
- Website: official website (NSW)

Ron Dorff is a French-Swedish sportswear brand for men founded in 2012 by Claus Lindorff.

Claus Lindorff began the brand's initial funding rounds in 2012 .

== History ==
Claus Lindorff founded the brand in 2010. His background is in finance, contemporary art and advertising. While working in Paris, he established BETC Luxe, a leading fashion and luxury brand agency. Initially, Ron Dorff focussed on sportswear introducing sports essentials that combined Swedish functionality with French style.

Ron Dorff is a brand that sells sportswear, swimwear, loungewear, and underwear. Its designs include a "DAD" print used on sweatshirts, t-shirts, underwear, and caps. Swimwear accounts for approximately 25% of the brand's annual sales. The swimwear designs utilize features from 1960s and 1970s models and are manufactured with technical fabrics.

== Notable Work ==
Ron Dorff has ongoing collaborations with the Mykonos-based Jackie O’ boutique, beach club, and restaurant, as well as with Milan-based TBD Eyewear for sunglasses, Biarritz-based Bayona for espadrilles and London-based LØCI for sneakers. Ron Dorff's approach to product development and marketing focuses on minimalist design, year-round availability of products like swimwear and underwear, and collaborative efforts with brands that share a similar focus on quality and sustainability.

Ron Dorff collaborated with American actor Neil Patrick Harris on a collection of wardrobe essentials. The collaboration used the DAD and PAPA prints and featured classic T-shirts, cashmere sweaters, coach caps and the brand's first children’s pieces with BRO and SIS prints. The brand launched the collection in September 2022 and donated fifteen per cent of its proceeds to World Central Kitchen. This collaboration between Ron Dorff and Neil Patrick Harris featured clean-lined graphics and silhouettes. The resulting DAD print collection featured on a range of men's sportswear.

It opened its flagship store on Sunset Boulevard in 2020.

== See also ==
- Swim briefs
- Tracksuits
