= Best Time Ever with Neil Patrick Harris =

- Also known as: Best Time Ever
- Genre: Entertainment
- Based on: Ant & Dec’s Saturday Night Takeaway by Ant & Dec
- Written by: Paul Greenberg; Neil Patrick Harris; Jim Wise; Daniel Malakai Cabrera
- Directed by: Glenn Weiss
- Presented by: Neil Patrick Harris
- Starring: Nicole Scherzinger
- Theme music composer: John Stary
- Country of origin: United States
- Original language: English
- No. of seasons: 1
- No. of episodes: 8

Production
- Executive producers: Neil Patrick Harris; Siobhan Greene; Orly Adelson; Anthony McPartlin; Declan Donnelly; David A. Hurwitz
- Producers: Kim Armstrong; Kathleen Smyth
- Production location: Kaufman Astoria Studios
- Editors: Storm Choi; Alistair Knapp; Emlyn Pugh
- Running time: 44 minutes
- Production companies: Bill's Market & Television Productions; ITV Studios America; Prediction Productions

Original release
- Network: NBC
- Release: September 15 – November 3, 2015

Related
- Ant & Dec's Saturday Night Takeaway

Best Time Ever with Neil Patrick Harris (or Best Time Ever) is an American live television variety series adaptation of the British variety series Ant & Dec's Saturday Night Takeaway. The one-hour show was hosted and executive-produced by Neil Patrick Harris featuring Nicole Scherzinger as a co-host. The series aired on NBC from September 15, to November 3, 2015. On December 15, 2015, it was announced that the show had been cancelled after one season.

== Production ==
The plan to bring the series to television was announced on October 27, 2014, and was followed by a teaser promo during the 2015 Super Bowl. On May 10, 2015, NBC officially added the program to its lineup. The show was broadcast from Studio K of Kaufman Astoria Studios in New York. It was later announced in early September that Nicole Scherzinger would be joining the team.

== Episodes ==
No.	Guest announcer	Sing-Along Live guest/song	Other live guests	Original release date	US viewers (millions)
1	Reese Witherspoon	Gloria Gaynor "I Will Survive"	Carson Daly, Ant & Dec	September 15, 2015	6.60
2	Alec Baldwin	Bonnie Tyler "Total Eclipse of the Heart"	Seth Meyers	September 22, 2015	5.91
3	Tyler Perry	CeeLo Green "Forget You"	Micheal Long	September 29, 2015	5.99
4	Shaquille O'Neal	Gloria Estefan "Conga"	Andy Cohen, Bethenny Frankel & Zachary Levi	October 6, 2015	4.45
5	Jack Black	B-52s "Love Shack"	Matt Lauer & Savannah Guthrie	October 13, 2015	4.48
6	Reba McEntire	Omi "Cheerleader"	Drew Scott & Jonathan Scott	October 20, 2015	4.81
7	Kelly Ripa	Ray Parker Jr. "Ghostbusters"	Meredith Vieira	October 27, 2015	4.18
8	Kelsey Grammer	Backstreet Boys "I Want It That Way"	Apolo Ohno & David Alan Grier	November 3, 2015	5.06

== Episode format ==
=== Opening ===
Episodes 1–5
As the show's main intro plays, the episode's guest announcer reviews what will happen in this week's episode. After the intro finishes, the camera focuses on the guest announcer, who introduces themselves and usually gives a little information about themselves. Then, the announcer introduces Harris as he goes through a sign titled "Best Suit Ever", which dresses him up in his suit, before coming out. Harris then has a brief talk, which includes re-introducing himself, re-introducing the announcer, and information about the current week's happenings.

Episodes 6–8
The intro stopped playing at the beginning of each episode after episode 5, and the opening now just begins with the guest announcer welcoming the audience, then plays scenes of what will happen in the episode as the announcer reviews the events. After the scenes, the camera returns to the announcer as they introduce themselves, and then introduce Harris as he goes through the "Best Suit Ever" sign before coming out and having the brief talk.

=== Audience Surprise ===
Following the brief talk, Harris would surprise an audience member. This segment has received many different names but typically revolved around a close friend or relative sending in personal information to the producers and participating in parodies of popular media. In the end, Harris awarded the audience member with a trip or prize.

- Best Days of Your Life - Episode 1
- Get Ready - Episode 2
- We Are Family - Episode 3
- The Real Housewives Of Richmond, Virginia, Reunion Special - Episode 4
- My Diary... - Episode 5
- The Tweet Is On/It's Neil's Mom - Episode 6
- Somebody's Watching Me - Episode 7
- Best Time Ever Awards - Episode 8

=== Get Lucky ===
Get Lucky is a trivia gameshow in which one audience member is asked a series of 50-50 trivia questions from the current week's events. With every correct answer in 60 seconds, the player chooses a number which corresponds with a variety of prizes. Prizes range from novelty items such as candy all the way to a car or Jeep. At the end, the player is given a choice to keep the prizes already won or answer a final "Make or Break" question for a chance to win all 16 prizes or walk away with nothing.

=== Undercover ===
Undercover is a pre-taped prank segment in which Harris pranked a celebrity. In some instances, the celebrities were interviewed by Harris live.

=== Sing Along Live ===
Sing Along Live is a live karaoke segment where a popular singer or group sing a karaoke-style version of one of their most well-known songs. Three viewers participate via a hidden camera as the guest singer performs. At certain points, the song stops and one of the viewers must fill in a missing lyric, similar to that of Don't Forget the Lyrics! and The Singing Bee. If they sing the right lyric, they receive $1,000.

Notes
1. In the sixth episode, an audience member took part of the segment instead of a Skyped viewer.
2. In the seventh episode, the viewers had to fill three missing lyrics instead of one.
3. In the eighth episode, due to a poor Skype connection, one viewer did not sing the song (which was I Want It That Way by The Backstreet Boys in particular). However, he was still given $1,000.

=== Voices in Your Head ===
Voices in Your Head is another pre-taped prank segment. Harris, who is joined by a celebrity, will communicate with another celebrity, giving him/her instructions on how to handle three people.

=== Ticket to Slide ===
Ticket to Slide is a live segment. The contestants are regular people who don't know that they get to take part in a 60 ft slide, covered in oil and water, to grab keys. The contestants with keys unlock suitcases containing fantastic prizes, such as a trip to Australia.

=== Neil Vs. ===
In Neil Vs., Harris takes on another celebrity in a head-to-head physical or mental challenge. Challenges included trivia competitions and zipline races.

=== End of the Show Show ===
The End of the Show Show is a finale spectacular in which Harris, Scherzinger, Little NPH, Little Nicole and the guest announcer joined a popular performance group for a finale.
