= Gutenberg! The Musical! =

2005 musical by Scott Brown and Anthony King

Gutenberg!
- The Musical!
- Promotional poster for the Broadway production
- Music: Scott Brown; Anthony King
- Lyrics: Scott Brown; Anthony King
- Book: Scott Brown; Anthony King
- Productions: 2006 London; 2006 Off-Broadway; 2023 Broadway

Gutenberg! The Musical! is a musical written and composed by Scott Brown and Anthony King. Brown and King developed the show at the Upright Citizens Brigade Theatre in New York City, where versions of it played over the course of more than a year. The show was part of the 2005 New York Musical Theatre Festival and, in more final form, the 2006 Festival, and ran at the Jermyn Street Theatre in London in January 2006.

The musical opened off-Broadway on December 3, 2006, directed by Alex Timbers, and closed on May 6, 2007. A 2023 Broadway production, also helmed by Timbers, starred Josh Gad and Andrew Rannells.

The piece concerns two earnest but clueless theatre composers, who present a highly inaccurate musical about the life of Johannes Gutenberg to potential investors.

== Plot ==
Bud Davenport and Doug Simon are the authors of a musical about Johannes Gutenberg. At a backer's audition, they pitch the show to potential Broadway producers. Because the minimally-talented and starry-eyed authors do not have a cast or an orchestra, Bud and Doug play all of the roles themselves, wearing hats with the characters' names on them and switching the hats to indicate the different characters. They also use simple objects as props, such as a cardboard box, pencils, and a chair. Since Bud and Doug's research into the life of Gutenberg consisted only of a quick Google search, they have scant information about their subject and take a historical fiction approach, by which they mean that they just made stuff up.

In their musical, Gutenberg is a wine presser in the medieval German town of Schlimmer, a happy and cheery place, except that the town is horribly dirty and depressing, and no one except Gutenberg can read. Intent on saving the townspeople from their own ignorance, Gutenberg turns his wine press into a printing press, accomplishing this in one night. His beautiful but dim assistant Helvetica is in love with him, but Gutenberg is unaware of her feelings. Meanwhile, the show's villain, Monk, an evil monk who worships Satan, attempts to keep ignorance alive so he can control the townspeople through inaccurate readings of the Bible and seeks to destroy the printing press.

Despite their ineptitude, Bud and Doug's high-energy and optimistic performance of their show launches their dreams, as they are awarded a Broadway production contract.

== Productions ==
=== New York and London premieres ===
The show was originally produced as a 45-minute one-act musical, workshopped at the Upright Citizens Brigade Theatre in New York City by its creators, Scott Brown and Anthony King. It was also shown at the 2005 New York Musical Theatre Festival. These early versions of the show starred the creators and were directed by Charlie Todd and music directed and accompanied by Barry Wyner.

The full two-act version of the show premiered at the Jermyn Street Theatre in London in January 2006. That production was music directed and accompanied by Michael Roulston and also starred Brown and King.

Christopher Fitzgerald and Jeremy Shamos played Bud and Doug at the 2006 New York Musical Theatre Festival. That production was directed by Dave Mowers and music directed and accompanied by Matt Castle; it won awards for Best Book and Best Performance.

An off-Broadway production opened on December 3, 2006, at 59E59 Theaters in midtown before moving to another midtown venue on January 16, 2007, the now-closed Actors' Playhouse. The production was directed by Alex Timbers with music direction by T. O. Sterrett, and starred Christopher Fitzgerald and Jeremy Shamos. It closed on May 6, 2007. It was nominated for Best Musical at the Lortel and Outer Critics Circle Awards, and Best Book and Best Director of a Musical at the Drama Desk Awards. David Turner and Darren Goldstein replaced the original cast.

=== Regional and international (2007–2023) ===
The first regional U.S. production was staged first by Plan-B Theatre Company in Salt Lake City, Utah, in November 2007. It was directed by Jerry Rapier, choreographed by Colleen Lewis, music directed by Jeffrey Price and starred Kirt Bateman as Doug and Jay Perry as Bud. The production was named Best Theatre Production by Salt Lake City Weekly, Best Play by Q Salt Lake and Best Comedy by the Deseret News. This production was revived in June 2011 as Plan-B Theatre Company's contribution to the Musicals on Main Series at the Egyptian Theatre in Park City, Utah, with the same director and cast. In September 2008, the musical played at Strawberry Theatre Workshop in Seattle, starring Troy Fischnaller as Doug and MJ Sieber as Bud, with piano accompaniment by Don Darryl Rivera, and directed by Greg Carter. A review in Seattle Weekly said: "Fischnaller's Doug is giddily foul-mouthed with self-congratulation, and Sieber has a twinkle in his eye even as he works himself into a sweaty state of breathless zeal. Both performers toil feverishly to keep director Greg Carter's pace for the show – a five-shot-espresso-with-a-Red-Bull-chaser momentum from start to finish. The brakes are completely disabled on this speeding clown car of inside theater jokes." The following month, it was produced by New Repertory Theater in Watertown, Massachusetts, near Boston. It was directed and choreographed by Stephen Nachamie, starring Brendan McNab as Bud and Austin Ku as Doug. McNab and Ku received uniformly positive reviews ("McNab and Ku have worked together before and it shows in their onstage chemistry. Their comic timing is spot on, especially when they complete each other's sentences or share a hug that seems to go on forever. Both men are also gifted with wonderful singing voices and make some of the songs better than they are.")

In February 2009 the show made its international debut at the Seymour Centre in Sydney, Australia. In May 2015, it played at the Akteon Théâtre in Paris, France. In February 2023, it opened at the Sala Azarte in Madrid, Spain. Hoy Madrid wrote, "The show's adaptation and artistic/musical direction were handled by Guillermo Sabariegos and Javier Chicharro, who did a superb job in creating an apparently simple yet truly captivating production."

=== Broadway (2023–2024) ===
The original Broadway production at the James Earl Jones Theatre began previews on September 15, 2023, and officially opened on October 12 as a limited run that played its final performance on January 28, 2024. It was directed by Timbers and starred Josh Gad and Andrew Rannells, who previously starred together in The Book of Mormon. Guests appeared in a cameo in the final scene of the show as the producer who gives Bud and Doug their Broadway contract. Notable guests included Nathan Lane, Billy Crystal, Lin-Manuel Miranda, John Stamos, Josh Groban, Marcia Gay Harden, Leslie Odom Jr., Lesley Stahl, Cynthia Erivo, Annaleigh Ashford, Ben Platt, Richard Kind, Jonathan Groff, Ashley Park, Vanessa Williams, Sherri Shepherd, Jesse Tyler Ferguson, Brian d'Arcy James, Martin Short, Steve Martin, Patti LuPone, Gaten Matarazzo, Sara Bareilles, Victor Garber, Santino Fontana, Kristin Chenoweth, Idina Menzel, Alex Brightman, Jake Gyllenhaal, Will Ferrell, Chuck Schumer, "Weird Al" Yankovic, Brooke Shields, Lance Bass, Aaron Tveit, Al Roker, Kerry Washington, Kerry Butler, Anna Wintour, Anne Hathaway, Amy Sedaris, Lena Hall, Darren Criss, Hillary Clinton, Jane Krakowski, Zachary Levi, Marilu Henner, Ariana DeBose, Triumph the Insult Comic Dog, Steve Guttenberg, Jennifer Garner, Shoshana Bean, Christian Slater, Evan Rachel Wood, Rachel Dratch, and Audra McDonald. The production recouped its initial investment of $6.75 million and set the one week box office record at the James Earl Jones Theatre of $1.463 million.

In May 2024, the production released an original cast recording featuring Gad and Rannells, with Mel Brooks playing the role of the Broadway producer in the finale track.

== Later productions ==
An Argentine production opened on 12 August 2025 at the Sala Pablo Picasso (Paseo La Plaza) in Buenos Aires. The cast starred Germán Tripel and Santiago Otero Ramos, with direction by Nicolás Medina and Ariadna Faerstein.

== Casts ==
| Character | London | Off-Broadway | Broadway |
| Character | 2006 | | 2023 |
|---|---|---|---|
| Bud Davenport | Scott Brown | Christopher Fitzgerald | Josh Gad |
| Doug Simon | Anthony King | Jeremy Shamos | Andrew Rannells |

== Musical numbers ==
Act I

- "Prologue/Schlimmer"
- "I Can't Read"
- "Haunted German Wood"
- "The Press Song"
- "I Can't Read (Reprise)"
- "Biscuits"
- "What's The Word?"
- "Stop The Press"
- "Tomorrow Is Tonight"

Act II

- "Second Prologue"
- "Words, Words, Words"
- "Monk With Me"
- "Might As Well (Go To Hell)"
- "Festival!"
- "Finale"

== Awards and nominations ==
=== Off-Broadway production ===
| Year | Award ceremony | Category | Nominee | Result |
|---|---|---|---|---|
| 2007 | Outer Critics Circle Awards | Outstanding New Off-Broadway Musical | | Nominated |
| 2007 | Lucille Lortel Awards | Outstanding Musical | | Nominated |
| 2007 | Drama Desk Awards | Outstanding Book of a Musical | Anthony King and Scott Brown | Nominated |
| 2007 | Drama Desk Awards | Outstanding Director of a Musical | Alex Timbers | Nominated |

=== Broadway production ===
Although no previous production had played on Broadway, the Tony nominating committee categorized the production as a revival, making it ineligible for Tony awards in the categories of Best Score and Best Book. Therefore, Brown and King shared the nomination for best revival of a musical with the show's producers.

| Year | Award ceremony | Category | Nominee | Result |
|---|---|---|---|---|
| 2024 | Tony Awards | Best Revival of a Musical | | Nominated |
| 2024 | Drama Desk Awards | Outstanding Revival of a Musical | | Nominated |
