= Scott Brown (writer) =

American author, screenwriter, critic and composer

Scott Brown is an American author, screenwriter, journalist, critic and occasional composer based in New York and Western Massachusetts. He was previously the chief theater critic for New York magazine from 2010 to 2014. He grew up in Durham, North Carolina, and later attended Harvard University.

Brown started his career in journalism at Entertainment Weekly, and went on to write articles, essays, film/theater reviews and humor for Entertainment Weekly, Wired, GQ, and Time, among others. In 2013, writing for New York magazine, he won the George Jean Nathan Award for Dramatic Criticism. His short fiction has been featured on the radio program This American Life. He is also the author of xL, a young adult novel published in 2019 by Alfred A. Knopf.

His television credits include HBO's Emmy-nominated miniseries Sharp Objects, based on the Gillian Flynn novel of the same name, as well as WGN's critically acclaimed Manhattan. He was a writer and co-executive producer for the Stephen King-derived suspense series Castle Rock on Hulu, for which he received the 2018 Writers Guild of America Award for Television: Long Form – Original. He was also a consulting producer on the Amazon Prime Video series Utopia, adapted by Gillian Flynn from the original work.

Brown collaborated with childhood friend and writing partner Anthony King to write Gutenberg! The Musical!, which premiered Off-Broadway in 2006 and on Broadway in 2023. He also collaborated with King on the book for the Broadway musical Beetlejuice, for which the pair was nominated for a Tony Award for Best Book of a Musical in 2019.
