= List of awards and nominations received by Neil Patrick Harris =

Neil Patrick Harris awards and nominations
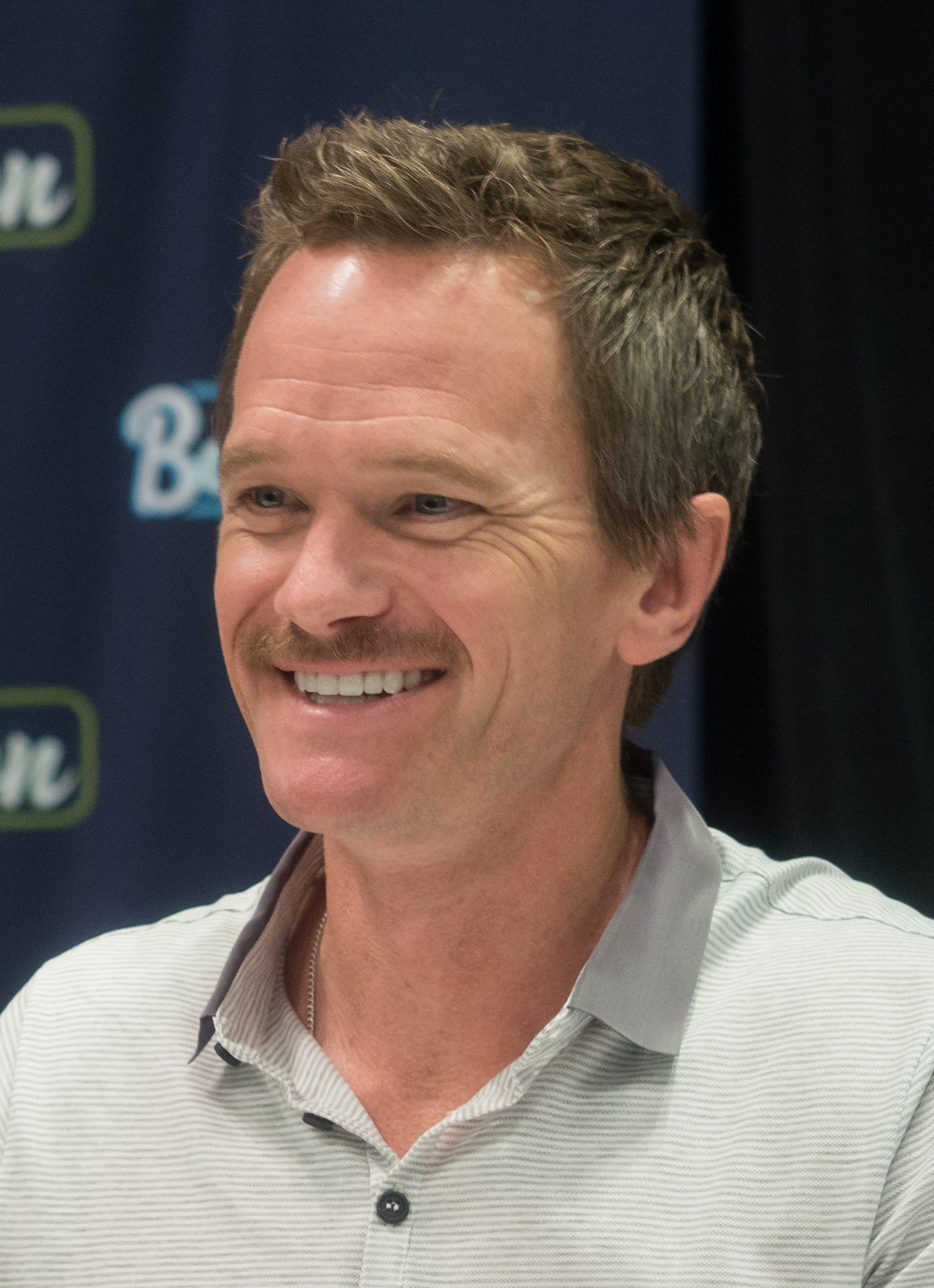
- Harris in 2019
Awards and nominations
Award	Wins	Nominations
Emmy Awards	5	13
Golden Globe Awards	0	4
Grammy Awards	0	1
Tony Awards	1	1

Neil Patrick Harris is an American actor, singer, writer, producer, and television host.

He is known for his comedy roles on television and his dramatic and musical stage roles. On TV, he is known for playing the title character on the ABC series Doogie Howser, M.D. (1989–1993), for which he was nominated for the Golden Globe Award for Best Actor – Television Series Musical or Comedy, as well as Barney Stinson on the CBS series How I Met Your Mother (2005–2014, for which he was nominated for four Emmy Awards), and Count Olaf on the Netflix series A Series of Unfortunate Events (2017–2019).

In 2010, Harris won two awards at the 62nd Primetime Emmy Awards, winning for Outstanding Guest Actor in a Comedy Series for his guest appearance on Glee, and Outstanding Special Class Program for hosting the Tony Awards in 2009; he has won the latter award three additional times for hosting the show in 2011, 2012, and 2013. He also hosted the Primetime Emmy Awards in 2009 and 2013, and hosted the 87th Academy Awards in 2015, thus making him the first openly gay man to host the Academy Awards. In 2014, he starred in the title role in Hedwig and the Angry Inch on Broadway, for which he won the 2014 Tony Award for Best Leading Actor in a Musical.

== Major associations ==
=== Emmy Awards ===
Primetime Emmy Awards
Year	Category	Nominated work	Result	Ref.
2007	Outstanding Supporting Actor in a Comedy Series	How I Met Your Mother	Nominated	
2008	Outstanding Supporting Actor in a Comedy Series	How I Met Your Mother	Nominated	
2009	Outstanding Supporting Actor in a Comedy Series	How I Met Your Mother	Nominated	
2010	Outstanding Supporting Actor in a Comedy Series	How I Met Your Mother	Nominated	
2010	Outstanding Guest Actor in a Comedy Series	Glee	Won	
2010	Outstanding Special Class Program	63rd Tony Awards	Won	
2012	Outstanding Special Class Program	65th Tony Awards	Won	
2013	Outstanding Special Class Program	66th Tony Awards	Won	
2014	Outstanding Special Class Program	67th Tony Awards	Won	
2015	Outstanding Special Class Program	87th Academy Awards	Nominated	
2018	Outstanding Children's Program	A Series of Unfortunate Events	Nominated	
2019	Outstanding Children's Program	A Series of Unfortunate Events	Nominated	
Daytime Emmy Awards
2014	Outstanding Special Class Special	Disney Parks Christmas Day Parade	Nominated	

=== Golden Globe Awards ===
Year	Category	Nominated work	Result	Ref.
1988	Best Supporting Actor – Motion Picture	Clara's Heart	Nominated	
1991	Best Actor in a Television Series – Musical or Comedy	Doogie Howser, M.D.	Nominated	
2008	Best Supporting Actor – Series, Miniseries or Television Film	How I Met Your Mother	Nominated	
2009	Best Supporting Actor – Series, Miniseries or Television Film	How I Met Your Mother	Nominated	

=== Grammy Awards ===
Year	Category	Nominated work	Result	Ref.
2015	Best Musical Theatre Album	Hedwig and the Angry Inch	Nominated	

=== Tony Awards ===
Year	Category	Nominated work	Result	Ref.
2014	Best Actor in a Musical	Hedwig and the Angry Inch	Won	

== Miscellaneous awards ==
Year	Award	Category	Title	Result
1989	Young Artist Award	Best Leading Young Actor in a Feature Film	Clara's Heart	Nominated
1990	Young Artist Award	Best Young Actor Starring in a Television Series	Doogie Howser, M.D.	Won
1990	People's Choice Award	Favorite Male Performer in a New TV Series	Doogie Howser, M.D.	Won
1990	People's Choice Award	Favorite Male TV Performer	Doogie Howser, M.D.	Nominated
1990	Viewers for Quality Television Award	Best Actor in a Quality Comedy Series	Doogie Howser, M.D.	Nominated
1991	Young Artist Award	Best Young Actor Starring in a Television Series	Doogie Howser, M.D.	Won
2007	Teen Choice Award	Choice TV Actor: Comedy	How I Met Your Mother	Nominated
2008	People's Choice Award	Favorite Scene Stealing Star	How I Met Your Mother	Nominated
2008	Teen Choice Award	Choice TV Actor: Comedy	How I Met Your Mother	Nominated
2009	TCA Award	Individual Achievement in Comedy	How I Met Your Mother	Nominated
2009	Teen Choice Award	Choice TV Actor: Comedy	How I Met Your Mother	Nominated
2009	Streamy Award	Best Male Actor in a Comedy Web Series	Dr. Horrible's Sing-Along Blog	Won
2009	Satellite Award	Best Supporting Actor – Series, Miniseries or Television Film	How I Met Your Mother	Nominated
2010	Spike Video Game Award	Best Performance by a Human Male	Spider-Man: Shattered Dimensions	Won
2010	Satellite Award	Best Supporting Actor – Series, Miniseries or Television Film	How I Met Your Mother	Nominated
2011	People's Choice Award	Favorite TV Comedy Actor	How I Met Your Mother	Won
2011	People's Choice Award	Favorite TV Guest Star	Glee	Nominated
2011	Critics' Choice Television Award	Best Supporting Actor in a Comedy Series	How I Met Your Mother	Won
2011	Satellite Award	Best Supporting Actor – Series, Miniseries or Television Film	How I Met Your Mother	Nominated
2012	People's Choice Award	Favorite TV Comedy Actor	How I Met Your Mother	Won
2012	TV Guide Award	Favorite Actor	How I Met Your Mother	Nominated
2012	Teen Choice Award	Choice TV Actor: Comedy	How I Met Your Mother	Nominated
2013	Webby Award	Best Comedy: Long Form or Series	Neil's Puppet Dreams	Nominated
2013	People's Choice Award	Favorite TV Comedy Actor	How I Met Your Mother	Nominated
2014	People's Choice Award	Favorite TV Comedy Actor	How I Met Your Mother	Nominated
2014	People's Choice Award	Favorite TV Bromance	How I Met Your Mother	Nominated
2014	Nickelodeon Kids' Choice Award	Favorite Movie Actor	The Smurfs 2	Nominated
2014	Drama Desk Award	Outstanding Actor in a Musical	Hedwig and the Angry Inch	Won
2014	Drama League Award	Distinguished Performance	Hedwig and the Angry Inch	Won
2014	Outer Critics Circle Award	Outstanding Actor in a Musical	Hedwig and the Angry Inch	Nominated
2014	Hasty Pudding Theatricals	Hasty Pudding Man of the Year		Won
2014	Dorian Award	TV Musical Performance of the Year	68th Tony Awards	Won
2015	Alliance of Women Film Journalists Award	Best Depiction of Nudity, Sexuality, or Seduction	Gone Girl	Nominated
2015	Dorian Award	Wilde Artist of the Year		Nominated
2015	Saturn Award	Best Guest Performance in a Television Series	American Horror Story: Freak Show	Nominated
2017	Saturn Award	Best New Media Television Series	A Series of Unfortunate Events	Nominated
2018	Satellite Award	Best Actor – Television Series Musical or Comedy	A Series of Unfortunate Events	Nominated
2018	Peabody Award	Entertainment, Children's & Youth Programming	A Series of Unfortunate Events	Won
2019	Producers Guild of America Awards	Outstanding Children's Program	A Series of Unfortunate Events	Nominated
2019	Kid's Choice Awards	Favorite TV Drama	A Series of Unfortunate Events	Nominated
2019	Kid's Choice Awards	Favorite Male TV Star	A Series of Unfortunate Events	Nominated
2020	Producers Guild of America Awards	Outstanding Children's Program	A Series of Unfortunate Events	Nominated
2023	Theater Fans’ Choice Awards	Best Featured Performer In A Play	Peter Pan Goes Wrong	Won
2023	Drama League Award	Distinguished Performance	Peter Pan Goes Wrong	Nominated
2024	BroadwayWorld Washington DC Award	Best Direction of a Musical	Tick, Tick... Boom!	Nominated
