= Stand Up to Cancer =

US non-profit organization

Stand Up to Cancer Logo

Stand Up to Cancer (SU2C) is a charitable organization that was established as a division of the Entertainment Industry Foundation (EIF). In 2022, SU2C was separately incorporated and was recognized by the IRS as a Section 501(c)(3) public charity. SU2C aims to raise awareness and fund research to detect and treat cancers with the goal of curing all patients. This includes making early-stage detection part of the standard of care for all cancers, ultimately reducing cancer deaths.

== History ==
Stand Up to Cancer was founded in 2008 by a group of nine women who had been personally touched by cancer with the goal of reimagining the way cancer research could be done. With the realization that scientists were working in silos, SU2C set out to re-engineer a new model, one that mandated collaboration across institutions and scientific disciplines. SU2C was co-founded by Katie Couric, Noreen Fraser, Sherry Lansing, Kathleen Lobb, Lisa Paulsen, Rusty Robertson, Sue Schwartz, Pamela Oas Williams, Ellen Ziffren, and Laura Ziskin, who have served on the Founders and Advisors Committee (FAC). Ziskin and Fraser are deceased.

As of 2025, SU2C has funded over 3,100 researchers since its inception; collaborated with 210+ institutions; and raised over $800 million to fund groundbreaking research that has resulted in significant breakthroughs for cancer types including breast, colorectal, lung, melanoma, pancreatic, pediatric, prostate, and sarcoma.

As of January 2024, Julian Adams, Ph.D., serves as president and chief executive officer. Adams is an oncology researcher and pharmaceutical industry senior executive specializing in drug discovery and development in cancer. Adams had previously served on SU2C's Scientific Advisory Committee since 2008, and officially joined SU2C in July 2023 in the newly created position of chief science officer.

== Mission ==
Stand Up to Cancer's core strategy centers on funding collaborative science with rigorous oversight to find new ways to predict, diagnose, and treat disease earlier and more equitably. The organization believes that focusing on early detection and timelier intervention holds the promise of reducing cancer deaths.

Research Priorities

SU2C's investment in promising research for early-stage detection for all cancers, includes transformative new technologies like:

1. predictive modeling programs that use artificial intelligence (AI) to quickly catch cancers and guide the right treatment for patients
2. therapeutic cancer vaccines and precision therapies designed with the goal of helping immune system detect and destroy cancer cells
3. simple, non-invasive screening tests that can detect the smallest molecular signatures of cancer

Education and Awareness

SU2C uses the breadth and depth of its reach in the media and entertainment industries to inform and empower the public about the importance of cancer screenings and preventative care, encouraging participation in clinical trials and giving survivors a platform to share their stories.

== Research funding ==
With more than $800 million raised for cancer research, SU2C has spearheaded various scientific initiatives designed to revolutionize cancer research and treatment.

SU2C's research projects bring together top investigators from different institutions to accelerate the discovery and delivery of new therapies, and they have evolved to include an array of industry collaborations. Focusing on accelerating the development of new therapies, new methods of cancer interception, and new approaches to making these treatments and screening available to all, SU2C has created grant mechanisms that fund meaningful team-based research projects, like:

- SU2C's Dream Team grants fund multidisciplinary, multi-institutional, collaborative teams to take innovative ideas from concept to patient.
- Research Teams bring together scientists from different institutions answering important questions about cancer research and treatment.
- SU2C Convergence Grants unite physical and computational scientists with oncologists to ask fundamental questions about cancer biology, producing insights that can be rapidly applied for patient benefits.
- SU2C Catalyst teams use funding, compounds, and other materials from the pharmaceutical and biotechnology industries to rapidly assess new treatment combinations.
- Innovative Research Grants support cutting-edge cancer research that might not receive funding through traditional channels.
- Awards & Prizes provide support for smaller projects to rapidly explore the newest and most exciting ideas emerging from the cancer research community.

SU2C has fueled contributed to a series of therapies for breast cancer, lung cancer, melanoma, pancreatic cancer, pediatric cancer, sarcoma, and advanced colorectal and prostate cancers. This includes FDA-approved treatments, palbociclib, and abraxane plus gemcitabine .

== Events and partnerships ==
One of Stand Up To Cancer's fundraising initiatives is a biennial telecast that was first televised in over 170 countries on September 5, 2008. It was produced by 20th Century Fox Television in partnership with The Entertainment Industry Foundation, Laura Ziskin Productions and Seligman Entertainment Inc. The telecast was distributed by ABC, NBC and CBS and raised over $100 million after that evening's broadcast.

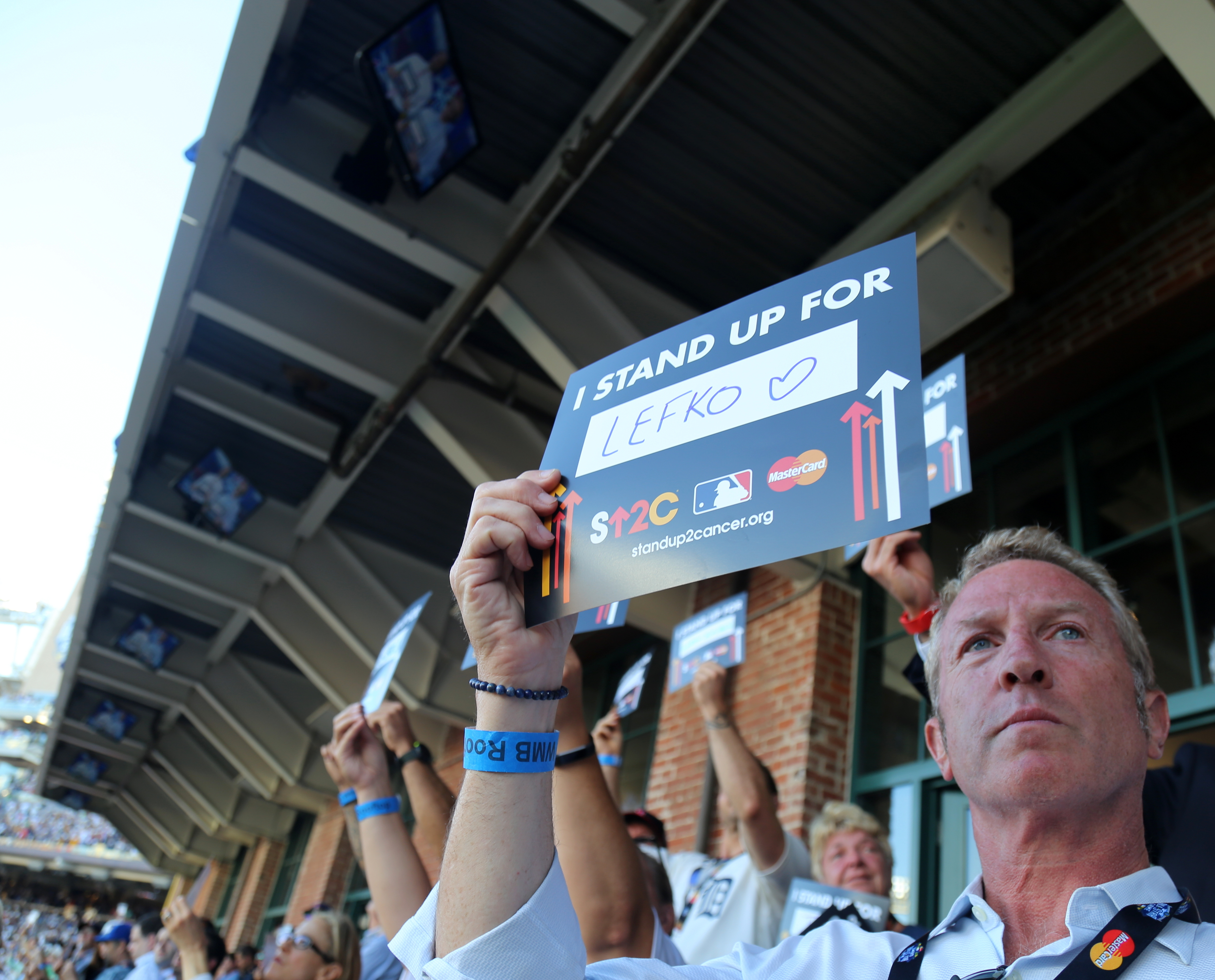
The Major League Baseball All-Star Game tradition of the Stand Up To Cancer placard moment, 2016

Over the course of a one-hour show, viewers can learn about new cancer research while also watching moments with stars from film, television, sports and journalism who have supported the SU2C movement.

The organization also partners with Major League Baseball. The partnership includes the SU2C Placard Moment, held during the MLB All-Star Game and World Series, in which fans, players, and others stand and hold placards honoring friends and loved ones affected by cancer.
