= Noreen Fraser Foundation =

American non-profit organization

The Noreen Fraser Foundation (NFF) was a national, non-profit, philanthropic organization based in Los Angeles. Its mission was to raise funds for breakthrough research that advances precision medicine for the prevention and treatment of women's cancers. Their hope was that the cancer will become a manageable disease that patients will live with and not die from, until it ceases to exist.

The Noreen Fraser Foundation was founded in 2006 by producer Noreen Fraser. NFF was involved in numerous successful fundraising campaigns, including Stand Up To Cancer and MenForWomenNow.com.

In 2016, the NFF closed, replaced by the Noreen Fraser Fund at UCLA's Jonsson Comprehensive Cancer Center.

== Noreen's Story ==
Noreen Fraser was diagnosed with Stage IV breast cancer in 2001. By 2003, her cancer had metastasized to her bones. After years of fighting, Fraser pledged to devote herself to raising money for focused research to find new techniques to prevent and fight cancer.

She started the Noreen Fraser Foundation in 2006 and recruited other survivors and prominent figures in the medical, entertainment, and business industries to join the organization. In 2008, Fraser co-created and co-produced the network television special Stand Up To Cancer (which raised over $100 million for cancer research).

Prior to starting the Noreen Fraser Foundation, Fraser produced other award-winning television shows including Entertainment Tonight, ABC's Home Show and The Richard Simmons Show. Prior to her death in 2017, Fraser was working on producing a documentary about cancer's effects and developing a television project that would serve to raise awareness for women's cancers.

== Fundraising programs ==
=== Men for Women Now ===
The Men for Women Now campaign targets men and urges them to encourage the women in their lives to schedule appointments for a mammogram and a Pap smear. Last May, the campaign worked with notable celebrities to create e-cards for Mother's Day. In Fall 2009, NFF and Men For Women Now teamed up with SocialVibe to create a Save The Boobs Facebook application to raise awareness about Breast Cancer Awareness Month, which takes place in October.

=== Stand Up To Cancer ===
Stand Up To Cancer (SU2C) is a charitable program of the Entertainment Industry Foundation (EIF) established by media, entertainment and philanthropic leaders who have been affected by cancer. The program was televised in over 170 countries on ABC, NBC, and CBS, three major broadcast networks, on September 5, 2008. The campaign raised over $100 million. Noreen Fraser Foundation (NFF) co-created Stand up to Cancer and is a member of their Executive Leadership Committee (ELC).

== Medical advisors ==
- John A. Glaspy
- Dennis Slamon
- Olufunmilayo Olopade
