= The Bridge of San Luis Rey =

1927 novel by Thornton Wilder

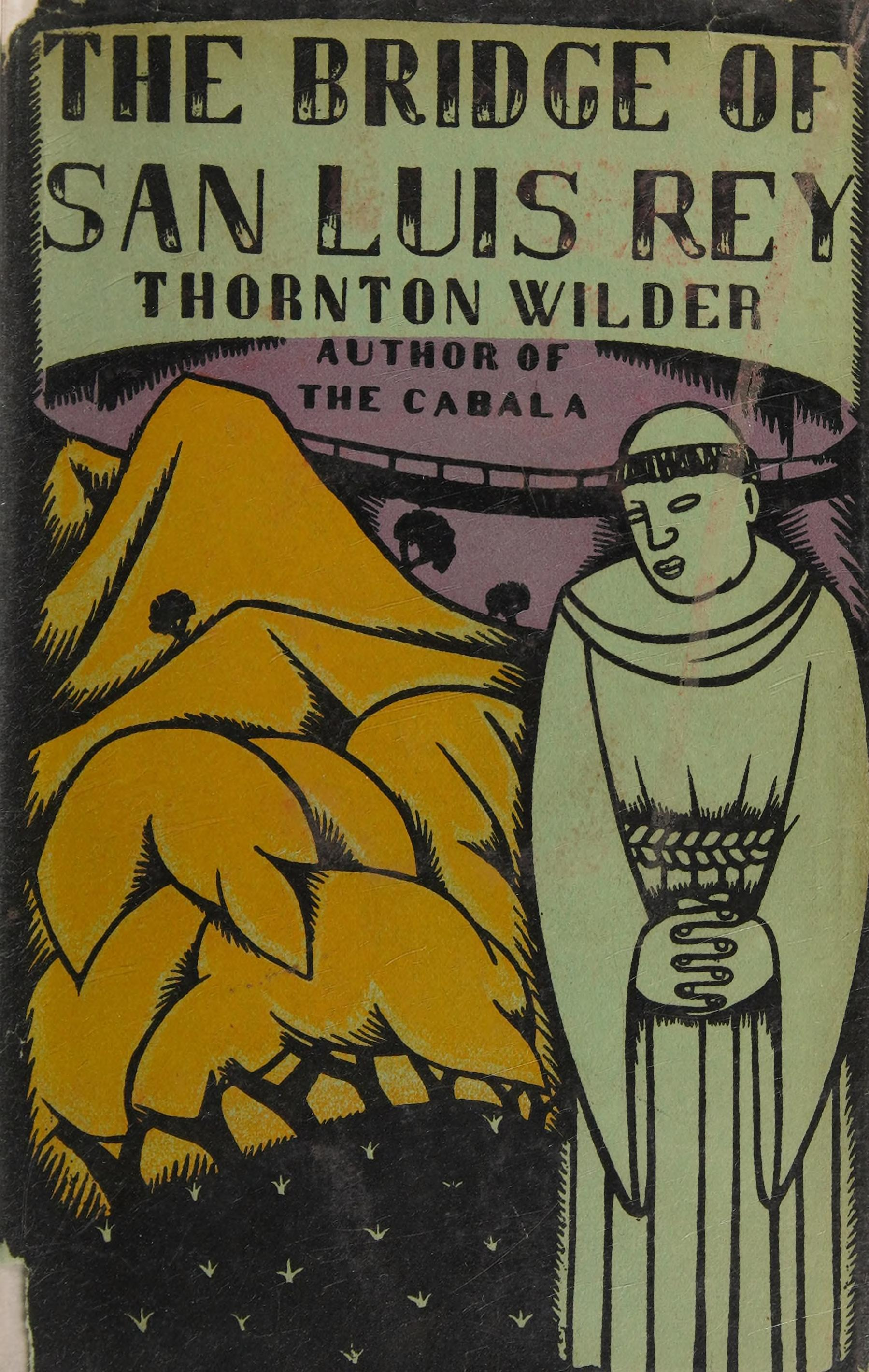
- First edition cover
- Author: Thornton Wilder
- Illustrator: Amy Drevenstedt
- Language: English
- Publisher: Albert & Charles Boni
- Publication date: 1927
- Publication place: United States
- Media type: Print (hardback & paperback)
- Pages: 235

The Bridge of San Luis Rey is American author Thornton Wilder's second novel. It was first published in 1927 to worldwide acclaim. The novel won the Pulitzer Prize in 1928, and was the best-selling work of fiction that year.

== Premise ==
The Bridge of San Luis Rey tells the story of people who die in the collapse of an Inca rope bridge in Peru during the viceregal era (when these territories formed part of the Spanish Monarchy), and the events that lead up to their being on the bridge. A friar who witnesses the accident then goes about inquiring into the lives of the victims, seeking some sort of cosmic answer to the question of why each had to die.

== Plot ==
=== Part One: Perhaps an Accident ===
The first few pages of the first chapter explain the novel's premise: the story of a fictional event that happened in Peru on the road between Lima and Cuzco, at noon on Friday, July 20, 1714. A rope bridge woven by the Inca a century earlier collapsed, while five people were crossing it, sending them falling from a great height to their deaths in the river below. The collapse was witnessed by Brother Juniper, a Franciscan friar who was on his way to cross the bridge. A pious man who seeks to provide some sort of empirical evidence that might prove to the world God's Divine Providence, he sets out to interview everyone he can find who knew the five victims. Over six years, he compiles a huge volume of evidence to show that the beginning and end of a person is all part of God's plan for that person. Part One foretells the burning of the book that occurs at the end of the novel but it also says that one copy of Brother Juniper's book survives and is at the library of the University of San Marcos, where it sits neglected.

=== Part Two: the Marquesa de Montemayor; Pepita ===
Part Two focuses on one of the victims of the collapse: Doña María, the Marquesa de Montemayor. The daughter of a wealthy cloth merchant, the Marquesa was an ugly child who eventually entered into an arranged marriage and bore a daughter, Clara, whom she loved dearly. Clara was indifferent to her mother, though and became engaged to a Spanish man and moved across the ocean to Spain where she married. Doña María visits her daughter in Spain, but when they cannot get along, she returns to Lima. The only way that they can communicate comfortably is by letter, and Doña María pours her heart into her writing, which becomes so polished that her letters will be read in schools in the centuries after her lifetime.

Doña María takes as her companion, Pepita, a girl raised at the Convent of Santa María Rosa de las Rosas. When she learns that her daughter is pregnant in Spain, Doña María decides to make a pilgrimage to the shrine of Santa María de Cluxambuqua to pray that the baby will be healthy and loved. Pepita goes along as company and to supervise the staff. When Doña María is out at the shrine, Pepita stays at the inn and writes a letter to her patron, the Abbess María del Pilar, complaining about her misery and loneliness. Doña María sees the letter on the table when she gets back and reads it. Later, she asks Pepita about the letter, and Pepita says she tore it up because the letter was not brave. Doña María has new insight into the ways in which her own life and love for her daughter have lacked bravery. She writes her "first letter" (actually Letter LVI) of courageous love to her daughter, but two days later, returning to Lima, she and Pepita are on the bridge of San Luis Rey when it collapses.

=== Part Three: Esteban ===
Esteban and Manuel are twins who were left at the Convent of Santa María Rosa de las Rosas as infants. The Abbess of the convent, Madre María del Pilar, developed a fondness for them as they grew up. When they became older, they decided to be scribes. They are so close that they have developed a secret language that only they understand. Their closeness becomes strained when Manuel falls in love with Camila Perichole, a famous actress.

Perichole flirts with Manuel and swears him to secrecy when she retains him to write letters to her lover, the Viceroy. Esteban has no idea of their relationship until she turns up at the twins' room one night in a hurry and has Manuel write to a matador with whom she is having an affair. Esteban encourages his brother to follow her, but instead Manuel swears that he will never see her again. Later, Manuel cuts his knee on a piece of metal and it becomes infected. The surgeon instructs Esteban to put cold compresses on the injury: the compresses are so painful that Manuel curses Esteban, though he later remembers nothing of his curses. Esteban offers to send for Perichole, but Manuel refuses. Soon after, Manuel dies.

When the Abbess comes to prepare the body, she asks Esteban his name, and he says he is Manuel. Gossip about his ensuing strange behavior spreads all over town. He goes to the theater but runs away before the Perichole can talk to him; the Abbess also tries to talk to him, but he runs away, so she sends for Captain Alvarado.

Captain Alvarado, a well-known sailor and explorer, goes to see Esteban in Cuzco and hires him to sail the world with him, far from Peru. Esteban agrees, then refuses, then acquiesces if he can get all his pay in advance to buy a present for the Abbess before he departs. That night Esteban attempts suicide but is saved by Captain Alvarado. The Captain offers to take him back to Lima to buy the present, and at the ravine spanned by the bridge of San Luis Rey, the Captain goes down to a boat that is ferrying some materials across the water. Esteban goes to the bridge and is on it when it collapses.

=== Part Four: Uncle Pio; Don Jaime ===
Uncle Pio acts as Camila Perichole's valet and "her singing-master, her coiffeur, her masseur, her reader, her errand-boy, her banker; rumor added: her father." He was born the bastard son of a Madrid aristocrat and later traveled the world engaged in a wide variety of dubious, though legal, businesses, most related to being a go-between or agent of the powerful, including (briefly) conducting interrogations for the Inquisition. His life "became too complicated" and he fled to Peru. He came to realize that he had just three interests in the world: independence; the constant presence of beautiful women; and the masterpieces of Spanish literature, particularly those of the theater.

He finds work as the confidential agent of the Viceroy of Peru. One day, he discovers a twelve-year-old café singer, Micaela Villegas, and takes her under his protection. Over the years, as they travel from tavern to tavern throughout Latin America, she grows into a beautiful and talented young woman. Uncle Pio instructs her in the etiquette of high society and goads her to greatness by expressing perpetual disappointment with her performances. She develops into Camila Perichole, the most honored actress in Lima.

After many years of success, Perichole becomes bored with the stage. The elderly Viceroy, Don Andrés, takes her as his mistress; she and Uncle Pio and the Archbishop of Peru and, eventually, Captain Alvarado meet frequently at midnight for dinner at the Viceroy's mansion. Through it all, Uncle Pio remains faithfully devoted to her, but as Camila ages and bears three children by the Viceroy she focuses on becoming a lady rather than an actress. She avoids Uncle Pio, and when he talks to her she tells him to not use her stage name.

When a smallpox epidemic sweeps through Lima, Camila is disfigured by it. She takes her young son Don Jaime, who suffers from convulsions, to the country. Uncle Pio sees her one night trying hopelessly to cover her pockmarked face with powder; ashamed, she refuses to ever see him again. He begs her to allow him to take her son to Lima and teach the boy as he taught her. Despairing at the turn her life has taken, she reluctantly agrees. Uncle Pio and Jaime leave the next morning, and are the fourth and fifth people on the bridge of San Luis Rey when it collapses.

=== Part Five: Perhaps an Intention ===
Brother Juniper labors for six years on his volume about the bridge collapse, talking to everyone he can find who knew the victims, trying various mathematical formulae to measure spiritual traits, with no results beyond conventionally pious generalizations. He compiles his interviews with complete faith in God's goodness and justice, but a council pronounces his work heretical, and his work and Brother Juniper are publicly burned for their heresy.

The story then shifts back in time to the day of a funeral service for those who died in the bridge collapse. The Archbishop, the Viceroy, and Captain Alvarado are at the ceremony. At the Convent of Santa María Rosa de las Rosas, the Abbess feels, having lost Pepita and the twin brothers, that her work to help the poor and infirm will die with her. A year after the accident, Camila Perichole seeks out the Abbess to ask how she can go on, having lost her son and Uncle Pio. Camila gains comfort and insight from the Abbess and, it is later revealed, becomes a helper at the Convent. Later, Doña Clara arrives from Spain, also seeking out the Abbess to speak with her about her mother, the Marquesa de Montemayor. She is greatly moved by the work of the Abbess in caring for the deaf, the insane, and the dying. The novel ends with the Abbess' observation: "There is a land of the living and a land of the dead and the bridge is love, the only survival, the only meaning".

== Themes and sources ==
Thornton Wilder said that the novel poses the question: "Is there a direction and meaning in lives beyond the individual's own will?" Describing the sources of his novel, Wilder explained that the plot was inspired

in its external action by a one-act play [Le Carrosse du Saint-Sacrement] by [the French playwright] Prosper Mérimée, which takes place in Latin America and one of whose characters is a courtesan. However, the central idea of the work, the justification for a number of human lives that comes up as a result of the sudden collapse of a bridge, stems from friendly arguments with my father, a strict Calvinist. Strict Puritans imagine God all too easily as a petty schoolmaster who minutely weights guilt against merit, and they overlook God's 'Caritas' which is more all-encompassing and powerful. God's love has to transcend his just retribution. But in my novel I have left this question unanswered. As I said earlier, we can only pose the question correctly and clearly, and have faith one will ask the question in the right way.

When asked if his characters were historical or imagined, Wilder replied, "The Perichole and the Viceroy are real people, under the names they had in history [a street singer named Micaela Villegas and her lover Manuel de Amat y Junyent, who was Viceroy of Peru at the time]. Most of the events were invented by me, including the fall of the bridge." He based the Marquesa's habit of writing letters to her daughter on his knowledge of the great French letter-writer Madame de Sévigné.

The bridge itself is based on the great Inca road suspension bridge across the Apurímac River, erected around 1350, still in use in 1864, and dilapidated but still hanging in 1890. When asked by the explorer Victor Wolfgang von Hagen whether he had ever seen a reproduction of E. G. Squier's woodcut illustration of the bridge as it was in 1864, Wilder replied: "It is best, von Hagen, that I make no comment or point of it." In fact, in a letter to Yale professor Chauncey Tinker, Wilder wrote that he had invented the bridge altogether. The name of the bridge is drawn from the Mission San Luis Rey de Francia in San Diego County, California.

== Recognition and influence ==
The Bridge of San Luis Rey won the 1928 Pulitzer Prize for the Novel, and remains widely acclaimed as Wilder's most famous novel. In 1998, the work was rated number 37 by the editorial board of the Modern Library on the list of the 100 best 20th-century novels. Time magazine included the novel in its List of the 100 Best Novels.

=== Influences ===
- In the 1941 novel The Real Life of Sebastian Knight by Vladimir Nabokov, the narrator, V, finds a copy of the novel in his brother Sebastian's library.
- The novel is mentioned in Elizabeth Goudge's The Castle on the Hill (1942, Chapter I, Part II), as an elderly historian attempts to console a woman whose life has been full of personal tragedy and war-time disaster, saying that "in this case death came to those five just at the most fitting moment of their lives, and that this so-called tragedy, as it affected the lives of others, brought alterations in the pattern [of life] that spelled in the long run only blessing and peace".
- Qui non riposano, a 1945 novel by Indro Montanelli, takes inspiration from the novel.
- American writer John Hersey cited the novel as a direct inspiration for his nonfiction work Hiroshima (1946).
- The novel is mentioned in passing by a character in The Dark Tower III: The Waste Lands (1991), the third volume in Stephen King's Dark Tower series.
- David Mitchell's novels Ghostwritten (1999) and Cloud Atlas (2004) echo the story in many ways, most explicitly through the character Luisa Rey.
- The novel is mentioned in the American television series Monk, season one (2002–03) episode 11, "Mr Monk and the Earthquake".
- A line from the novel is paraphrased on the cover of Sea Power's 2003 album The Decline of British Sea Power. Appearing on the album cover as "There is a land for the living and there is a land for the dead...", it was written by Wilder as "There is a land of the living and a land of the dead...."
- The Australian television series Glitch references the book in an episode from its second season (2007), and quotes the passage "There is a land of the living and a land of the dead and the bridge is love, the only survival, the only meaning."
- The novel is referred to in the novel Numero Zero (2015), by Umberto Eco.
- The novel is mentioned by a character in Joe Hill's 2016 novel The Fireman.
- The novel is mentioned in the novel Tom Lake (2023) by Ann Patchett.
- British Prime Minister Tony Blair quoted Wilder's text during the memorial service for victims of the September 11 attacks in 2001.

== Adaptations ==
Film

Four U.S. theatrical films and a television production have been based on the novel:

- The Bridge of San Luis Rey (1929)
- The Bridge of San Luis Rey (1944)
- The Bridge of San Luis Rey (1958)
- The Bridge of San Luis Rey (2004)

Theater

A play for puppets and actors was adapted from the novel by Greg Carter and directed by Sheila Daniels in 2006.

A play adapted by Cynthia Meier has been performed in Arizona and Connecticut.

Opera

Die Brücke von San Luis Rey: Szenen nach der Novelle von Thornton Wilder (1954), an opera by German composer Hermann Reutter, is based on the novel.

Illustrated and Abridged

An illustrated and abridged homage to the novel was published by Orchestrate Books in 2023.

== See also ==
- List of bridge disasters
