= Greg Carter (theatre director) =

Greg Carter is the founding Artistic Director of Strawberry Theatre Workshop (a.k.a. Strawshop), a non-profit theatre company in Seattle, Washington. He works as a freelance director, designer, and stage manager and teaches at Cornish College of the Arts. As a playwright, he has adapted This Land (Woody Guthrie), Fellow Passengers (Charles Dickens), and The Bridge of San Luis Rey (Thornton Wilder) for the stage.

== Professional career ==
Carter studied Drama and English at Duke University (1989), and has a Master of Architecture from the University of Washington (1999). From 1989-1994, he was Resident Artist and Technical Director at In the Heart of the Beast Puppet and Mask Theatre (HOBT) in Minneapolis. He trained as a puppeteer with Sandy Spieler and Jim Ouray at HOBT, and received a 1993 grant from the Puppeteers of America to create a play for puppets and actors derived from the writing, drawing, and music of American folk artist Woody Guthrie. The play This Land was remounted in Seattle in 2004 as the inaugural event of Strawberry Theatre Workshop., and again at Strawshop in Fall 2012.

After completing a graduate program at UW, Carter served as Production Manager and Technical Director at Book-It Repertory Theatre (1998–2002). He designed over a dozen plays at Book-It which appeared on the stages of ACT Theatre, Seattle Repertory Theatre, On the Boards, and Intiman Playhouse. As a freelance artist, Carter has designed sets for Seattle Symphony and Portland Center Stage. He is an Associate Professor of Performance Production at Cornish, where he has taught since 1998.

In 2011, Carter organized three small Seattle theatre companies to form a partnership eventually known as Black Box Operations. The three companies worked with the affordable housing developer Capitol Hill Housing on the design of a multi-use building that combines 88 residential units, office space, storefront retail, a community meeting space, and two flexible black box theatre venues. The building, called 12th Ave Arts, opened in Fall 2014, with first performances the following January.

Beginning in summer 2015, Greg Carter has served as Administrative Director of Black Box Operations.

== Critical reception ==
In 2007, Strawshop received The Stranger newspaper’s Genius Award for an Organization—a prize awarded in other years to On the Boards, Pacific Northwest Ballet, and the Frye Art Museum. In 2010, Carter was nominated for a TPS Gregory Award as Outstanding Director for The Laramie Project, and again in 2015 as Outstanding Director for Our Town.
