= 2018–19 United States network television schedule =

Television schedule for the fall of 2018

The 2018–19 network television schedule for the five major English-language commercial broadcast networks that air in the United States covers the prime time hours from September 2018 to August 2019. The schedule is followed by a list per network of returning series, new series, and series canceled after the 2017–18 season.

NBC was the first to announce its fall schedule on May 13, 2018, followed by Fox on May 14, ABC on May 15, CBS on May 16, and The CW on May 17, 2018.

On May 29, 2018, ABC removed Roseanne from its Tuesday lineup due to a controversial statement made by Roseanne Barr on Twitter about Valerie Jarrett, and replaced it with The Conners on June 21 for the fall.

PBS is not included, as member television stations have local flexibility over most of their schedules and broadcast times for network shows may vary. Ion Television, The CW Plus, and MyNetworkTV are also not included since the networks' schedules comprise syndicated reruns (with limited original programming on the latter two). The CW does not air network programming on Saturday nights.

Each of the 30 highest-rated shows released in May 2019 is listed with its rank and rating as determined by Nielsen Media Research.

Beginning with this season, The CW returned to programming a Sunday evening schedule for the first time since the 2008–09 season as of October 7 (the network commenced its regular Sunday schedule the following week, on October 14); programming formerly airs on that night from 8 p.m. to 10 p.m. ET/PT (until October 1, 2023 which now airs from 7 p.m. to 10 p.m. ET/PT) making it the only broadcast television network to not program the Sunday 7 p.m. ET/PT hour since that hour was given to the broadcast networks through the implementation of a 1975 amendment to the since-repealed Prime Time Access Rule (PTAR).

New series to broadcast television are highlighted in bold.

Repeat airings or same-day rebroadcasts are indicated by (R).

All times are U.S. Eastern and Pacific Time (except for some live sports or events). Subtract one hour for Central, Mountain, Alaska, and Hawaii–Aleutian times.

All sporting events air live in all time zones in U.S. Eastern time, with local and/or late-night programming scheduled by affiliates after game completion.

== Legend ==
- Light blue indicates local programming.
- Gray indicates encore programming.
- Blue-gray indicates news programming.
- Light green indicates sporting events.
Red indicates series being burned off and other irregularly scheduled programs, including specials and movies.
Light gold indicates programming produced outside of the United States.
highlight Yellow highlights indicates the top-10 most watched programs of the season.
highlight Cyan highlights indicates numbers 11-20 most watched programs of the season.
highlight Magenta highlights indicates numbers 21-30 most watched programs of the season.
highlight Highlights indicates that it falls in multiple of the above categories.

== Sunday ==
Network		7:00 p.m.	7:30 p.m.	8:00 p.m.	8:30 p.m.	9:00 p.m.	9:30 p.m.	10:00 p.m.	10:30 p.m.
ABC	Fall	America's Funniest Home Videos		**Dancing with the Stars: Juniors**		Shark Tank		**The Alec Baldwin Show**	
ABC	Late fall	America's Funniest Home Videos		**Dancing with the Stars: Juniors**		Shark Tank			
ABC	Winter	America's Funniest Home Videos				Shark Tank			
ABC	Spring	America's Funniest Home Videos		American Idol				Shark Tank	
ABC	Summer	America's Funniest Home Videos		Celebrity Family Feud		The $100,000 Pyramid		To Tell the Truth	
CBS	Fall	NFL on CBS (4:25 p.m.)	60 Minutes (18/6.7)		**God Friended Me** (27/5.8) (Tied with The Conners)		NCIS: Los Angeles (22/6.2) (Tied with Hawaii Five-0 and The Voice)		Madam Secretary (continued until 11:30 p.m.)
CBS	Winter	60 Minutes (18/6.7)		Celebrity Big Brother		NCIS: Los Angeles (22/6.2) (Tied with Hawaii Five-0 and The Voice)		Madam Secretary	
CBS	Mid-winter	60 Minutes (18/6.7)		**God Friended Me** (27/5.8) (Tied with The Conners)		NCIS: Los Angeles (22/6.2) (Tied with Hawaii Five-0 and The Voice)		Madam Secretary	
CBS	Spring	60 Minutes (18/6.7)		**The Red Line**				NCIS: Los Angeles (22/6.2) (Tied with Hawaii Five-0 and The Voice)	
CBS	Late spring	60 Minutes (18/6.7)		**God Friended Me** (R)				NCIS: Los Angeles (22/6.2) (Tied with Hawaii Five-0 and The Voice)	
CBS	Summer	60 Minutes (18/6.7)		Big Brother		Instinct		**The Good Fight**	
CBS	Late summer	60 Minutes (18/6.7)		Big Brother		Instinct		NCIS: Los Angeles (R)	
The CW	Fall	Local programming		Supergirl		**Charmed**		Local programming	
The CW	Summer	Local programming		Burden of Truth		Supernatural (R)		Local programming	
The CW	Mid-summer	Local programming		Burden of Truth		Whose Line Is It Anyway? (R)		Local programming	
The CW	Late summer	Local programming		Penn & Teller: Fool Us (R)		**Pandora** (R)		Local programming	
Fox	Fall	Fox NFL (4:25 p.m.)	The OT	The Simpsons	Bob's Burgers	Family Guy	**Rel**	Local programming	
Fox	Winter	The Simpsons (R)	Bob's Burgers (R)	The Simpsons	Bob's Burgers	Family Guy	Family Guy (R)	Local programming	
Fox	Summer	Last Man Standing (R)		The Simpsons	Bob's Burgers	Family Guy	**What Just Happened??!**	Local programming	
NBC	Fall	Football Night in America		NBC Sunday Night Football (8:20 p.m.) (continued to game completion) (1/10.9)					
NBC	Winter	Various programming							
NBC	Spring	Ellen's Game of Games (R)		World of Dance				Good Girls	
NBC	Late spring	American Ninja Warrior (R)				America's Got Talent (R)			
NBC	Summer	Hollywood Game Night (R)		America's Got Talent (R)				**New Amsterdam** (R)	
NBC	Late summer	Hollywood Game Night (R)		America's Got Talent (R)				**Bring the Funny** (R)	

- Note: ABC began airing American Idol live to allow Contiguous United States and Canadian CTV viewers to vote in all time zones in April, with the rebroadcasts airing in its regular time period in the Pacific, Alaska, Hawaii, and Guam time zones.

== Monday ==
Network		8:00 p.m.	8:30 p.m.	9:00 p.m.	9:30 p.m.	10:00 p.m.	10:30 p.m.
ABC	Fall	Dancing with the Stars (29/5.5) (Tied with Survivor)				The Good Doctor (9/7.4) (Tied with Manifest)	
ABC	Late fall	The Great Christmas Light Fight				The Good Doctor (9/7.4) (Tied with Manifest)	
ABC	Winter	The Bachelor				The Good Doctor (9/7.4) (Tied with Manifest)	
ABC	Spring	American Idol				**The Fix**	
ABC	Summer	The Bachelorette				**Grand Hotel**	
ABC	Mid-summer	Bachelor in Paradise				**Grand Hotel**	
CBS	Fall	**The Neighborhood**	**Happy Together**	**Magnum P.I.**		Bull (13/7.0) (Tied with Chicago Med)	
CBS	Winter	**The Neighborhood**	Man with a Plan	Celebrity Big Brother		Bull (13/7.0) (Tied with Chicago Med)	
CBS	Mid-winter	**The Neighborhood**	Man with a Plan	**Magnum P.I.**		Bull (13/7.0) (Tied with Chicago Med)	
CBS	Spring	**The Neighborhood**	Man with a Plan	**The Code**		Bull (13/7.0) (Tied with Chicago Med)	
CBS	Late spring	**The Neighborhood**	Man with a Plan	**Magnum P.I.** (R)		Bull (13/7.0) (Tied with Chicago Med)	
CBS	Summer	**The Neighborhood**	**The Neighborhood** (R)	**God Friended Me** (R)		Bull (13/7.0) (Tied with Chicago Med)	
CBS	Mid-summer	**Love Island**		**The Code**		Bull (13/7.0) (Tied with Chicago Med)	
CBS	Late summer	**The Neighborhood** (R)	The Big Bang Theory (R)		Mom (R)	Bull (13/7.0) (Tied with Chicago Med)	
The CW	Fall	Arrow		Legends of Tomorrow		Local programming	
The CW	Winter	Arrow		Black Lightning		Local programming	
The CW	Spring	Legends of Tomorrow		Arrow		Local programming	
The CW	Summer	Penn & Teller: Fool Us		Whose Line Is It Anyway?	Whose Line Is It Anyway? (R)	Local programming	
The CW	Late summer	Penn & Teller: Fool Us		Whose Line Is It Anyway?	**I Ship It**	Local programming	
Fox	Fall	The Resident		9-1-1 (26/5.9)		Local programming	
Fox	Winter	The Resident		**The Passage**		Local programming	
Fox	Spring	The Resident		9-1-1 (26/5.9)		Local programming	
Fox	Late spring	9-1-1 (R)		Paradise Hotel		Local programming	
Fox	Summer	Beat Shazam		9-1-1 (R)		Local programming	
Fox	Mid-summer	Beat Shazam		So You Think You Can Dance		Local programming	
NBC	Fall	The Voice (19/6.6)				**Manifest** (9/7.4) (Tied with The Good Doctor)	
NBC	Winter	**America's Got Talent: The Champions** (11/7.2) (Tied with Chicago Fire)				**Manifest** (9/7.4) (Tied with The Good Doctor)	
NBC	Late winter	The Voice (19/6.6)				**The Enemy Within**	
NBC	Summer	American Ninja Warrior				Dateline NBC	

== Tuesday ==
Network		8:00 p.m.	8:30 p.m.	9:00 p.m.	9:30 p.m.	10:00 p.m.	10:30 p.m.
ABC	Fall	**The Conners** (27/5.8) (Tied with God Friended Me)	**The Kids Are Alright**	Black-ish	Splitting Up Together	**The Rookie**	
ABC	Winter	American Housewife	**The Kids Are Alright**	Black-ish	Splitting Up Together	**The Rookie**	
ABC	Spring	American Housewife	**The Kids Are Alright**	Black-ish	**Bless This Mess**	**1969**	
ABC	Summer	**The Conners** (R)	American Housewife (R)	Modern Family (R)	The Goldbergs (R)	Modern Family (R)	Black-ish (R)
ABC	Late summer	Bachelor in Paradise				**Bless This Mess** (R)	Black-ish (R)
CBS	Fall	NCIS (3/9.6)		**FBI** (7/7.9) (Tied with Blue Bloods)		NCIS: New Orleans (17/6.8)	
CBS	Summer	NCIS (3/9.6)		**FBI** (7/7.9) (Tied with Blue Bloods)		**Blood & Treasure**	
CBS	Mid-summer	**Love Island**		NCIS (R)		**Blood & Treasure**	
The CW	Fall	The Flash		Black Lightning		Local programming	
The CW	Winter	The Flash		**Roswell, New Mexico**		Local programming	
The CW	Spring	The Flash		The 100		Local programming	
The CW	Summer	**Pandora**		The 100		Local programming	
The CW	Late summer	**Pandora**		**Mysteries Decoded**		Local programming	
Fox	Fall	The Gifted		Lethal Weapon		Local programming	
Fox	Winter	Lethal Weapon		The Gifted		Local programming	
Fox	Spring	MasterChef Junior		**Mental Samurai**		Local programming	
Fox	Summer	9-1-1 (R)				Local programming	
Fox	Mid-summer	**Spin the Wheel** (R)		9-1-1 (R)		Local programming	
Fox	Late summer	The Resident (R)		**First Responders Live**		Local programming	
NBC	Fall	The Voice (22/6.2) (Tied with Hawaii Five-0 and NCIS: Los Angeles)		This Is Us (6/8.5)		**New Amsterdam** (15/6.9) (Tied with Chicago P.D.)	
NBC	Winter	Ellen's Game of Games		This Is Us (6/8.5)		**New Amsterdam** (15/6.9) (Tied with Chicago P.D.)	
NBC	Late winter	The Voice (22/6.2) (Tied with Hawaii Five-0 and NCIS: Los Angeles)		This Is Us (6/8.5)		**New Amsterdam** (15/6.9) (Tied with Chicago P.D.)	
NBC	Spring	Ellen's Game of Games		This Is Us (6/8.5)		**The Village**	
NBC	Mid-spring	The Voice (22/6.2) (Tied with Hawaii Five-0 and NCIS: Los Angeles)		**The Village**		**New Amsterdam** (15/6.9) (Tied with Chicago P.D.)	
NBC	Summer	America's Got Talent				**Songland**	
NBC	Mid-summer	America's Got Talent				**Bring the Funny**	

== Wednesday ==
Network		8:00 p.m.	8:30 p.m.	9:00 p.m.	9:30 p.m.	10:00 p.m.	10:30 p.m.
ABC	Fall	The Goldbergs	American Housewife	Modern Family	**Single Parents**	**A Million Little Things**	
ABC	Winter	The Goldbergs	**Schooled**	Modern Family	**Single Parents**	Match Game	
ABC	Late winter	The Goldbergs	**Schooled**	Modern Family	**Single Parents**	**Whiskey Cavalier**	
ABC	Summer	Press Your Luck		Card Sharks		Match Game	
CBS	Fall	Survivor: David vs. Goliath (29/5.5) (Tied with Dancing with the Stars)		SEAL Team		Criminal Minds	
CBS	Winter	Celebrity Big Brother		SEAL Team		Criminal Minds	
CBS	Late winter	**The World's Best**		Celebrity Big Brother		Criminal Minds	
CBS	Spring	Survivor: Edge of Extinction (29/5.5) (Tied with Dancing with the Stars)		**The World's Best**			
CBS	Mid-spring	Survivor: Edge of Extinction (29/5.5) (Tied with Dancing with the Stars)		**Million Dollar Mile**		SEAL Team	
CBS	Late spring	Survivor: Edge of Extinction (29/5.5) (Tied with Dancing with the Stars)		The Amazing Race		SEAL Team	
CBS	Summer	The Amazing Race		NCIS: The Cases They Can't Forget		SEAL Team	
CBS	Mid-summer	**Love Island**		Big Brother		S.W.A.T. (R)	
CBS	Late summer	Big Brother		SEAL Team (R)		S.W.A.T. (R)	
The CW	Fall	Riverdale		**All American**		Local programming	
The CW	Spring	Riverdale		Jane the Virgin		Local programming	
The CW	Late spring	My Last Days		Jane the Virgin		Local programming	
The CW	Summer	Penn & Teller: Fool Us (R)		Jane the Virgin		Local programming	
The CW	Mid-summer	**Bulletproof**		**Hypnotize Me**		Local programming	
Fox	Fall	Empire		Star		Local programming	
Fox	Winter	Gordon Ramsay's 24 Hours to Hell and Back		**The Masked Singer** (25/6.0)		Local programming	
Fox	Spring	Empire		Star		Local programming	
Fox	Late spring	MasterChef Celebrity Family Showdown		Paradise Hotel		Local programming	
Fox	Summer	MasterChef		Gordon Ramsay's 24 Hours to Hell and Back (R)		Local programming	
Fox	Mid-summer	MasterChef		**First Responders Live**		Local programming	
Fox	Late summer	MasterChef		**BH90210**		Local programming	
NBC	Fall	Chicago Med (13/7.0) (Tied with Bull)		Chicago Fire (11/7.2) (Tied with America's Got Talent: The Champions)		Chicago P.D. (15/6.9) (Tied with New Amsterdam)	
NBC	Summer	American Ninja Warrior				**The InBetween**	
NBC	Mid-summer	Ellen's Game of Games (R)		**Songland** (R)		**The InBetween**	
NBC	Late summer	America's Got Talent		**Songland**		Hollywood Game Night	

== Thursday ==
Network		8:00 p.m.	8:30 p.m.	9:00 p.m.	9:30 p.m.	10:00 p.m.	10:30 p.m.
ABC	Fall	Grey's Anatomy (20/6.5)		Station 19		How to Get Away with Murder	
ABC	Late fall	Holiday Specials		The Great American Baking Show			
ABC	Winter	Grey's Anatomy (20/6.5)		**A Million Little Things**		How to Get Away with Murder	
ABC	Spring	Grey's Anatomy (20/6.5)		Station 19		How to Get Away with Murder	
ABC	Summer	**Holey Moley**		**Family Food Fight**		**Reef Break**	
CBS	Fall	The Big Bang Theory (2/10.6)	Young Sheldon (4/8.7) (Tied with Thursday Night Football)	Mom (21/6.4)	Murphy Brown	S.W.A.T.	
CBS	Winter	The Big Bang Theory (2/10.6)	Young Sheldon (4/8.7) (Tied with Thursday Night Football)	Mom (21/6.4)	**Fam**	S.W.A.T.	
CBS	Spring	The Big Bang Theory (2/10.6)	Young Sheldon (4/8.7) (Tied with Thursday Night Football)	Mom (21/6.4)	Life in Pieces	S.W.A.T.	
CBS	Summer	The Big Bang Theory (2/10.6)	Young Sheldon (4/8.7) (Tied with Thursday Night Football)	Life in Pieces		Elementary	
CBS	Mid-summer	**Love Island**		Big Brother		Elementary	
CBS	Late summer	The Big Bang Theory (R)	Young Sheldon (R)	Big Brother		Elementary	
The CW	Fall	Supernatural		**Legacies**		Local programming	
The CW	Spring	iZombie		**In the Dark**		Local programming	
The CW	Summer	iZombie		The Outpost		Local programming	
The CW	Late summer	The Outpost		**Two Sentence Horror Stories**		Local programming	
Fox	Fall	Fox NFL Thursday	Thursday Night Football (8:20 p.m.) (continued to game completion) (4/8.7) (Tied with Young Sheldon)				
Fox	Winter	Gotham		The Orville		Local programming	
Fox	Summer	Paradise Hotel				Local programming	
Fox	Mid-summer	MasterChef		**Spin the Wheel**		Local programming	
NBC	Fall	Superstore	The Good Place	Will & Grace	**I Feel Bad**	Law & Order: Special Victims Unit	
NBC	Winter	**The Titan Games**		Brooklyn Nine-Nine	The Good Place	Law & Order: Special Victims Unit	
NBC	Mid-winter	**The Titan Games**		Brooklyn Nine-Nine	Will & Grace	Law & Order: Special Victims Unit	
NBC	Spring	Superstore	A.P. Bio	Brooklyn Nine-Nine	Will & Grace	Law & Order: Special Victims Unit	
NBC	Mid-spring	Superstore	A.P. Bio	Brooklyn Nine-Nine	**Abby's**	Law & Order: Special Victims Unit	
NBC	Summer	The Wall (R)		Hollywood Game Night		Law & Order: Special Victims Unit	
NBC	Late summer	The Wall (R)		Ellen's Game of Games (R)		Law & Order: Special Victims Unit	

- Note: On Fox, the network's pre-game show (co-produced with NFL Network and entitled Fox NFL Thursday) starts at 7:30 p.m. ET out of primetime, preempting local programming. NBC will carry NFL football games consuming the entirety of prime time on September 6 and November 22, for the NFL Kickoff game and Thanksgiving Day game, respectively, which for ratings measurement and contract purposes are counted within the Sunday Night Football package.

== Friday ==
Network		8:00 p.m.	8:30 p.m.	9:00 p.m.	9:30 p.m.	10:00 p.m.	10:30 p.m.
ABC	Fall	Fresh Off the Boat	Speechless	Child Support		20/20	
ABC	Winter	Fresh Off the Boat	Speechless	20/20			
ABC	Summer	Agents of S.H.I.E.L.D.		What Would You Do?		20/20	
CBS	Fall	MacGyver		Hawaii Five-0 (22/6.2) (Tied with NCIS: Los Angeles and The Voice)		Blue Bloods (7/7.9) (Tied with FBI)	
CBS	Winter	Celebrity Big Brother		Hawaii Five-0 (22/6.2) (Tied with NCIS: Los Angeles and The Voice)		Blue Bloods (7/7.9) (Tied with FBI)	
CBS	Mid-winter	MacGyver		Hawaii Five-0 (22/6.2) (Tied with NCIS: Los Angeles and The Voice)		Blue Bloods (7/7.9) (Tied with FBI)	
CBS	Summer	Whistleblower		Hawaii Five-0 (22/6.2) (Tied with NCIS: Los Angeles and The Voice)		Blue Bloods (7/7.9) (Tied with FBI)	
CBS	Mid-summer	**Love Island**		Hawaii Five-0 (22/6.2) (Tied with NCIS: Los Angeles and The Voice)		Blue Bloods (7/7.9) (Tied with FBI)	
The CW	Fall	Dynasty		Crazy Ex-Girlfriend		Local programming	
The CW	Spring	Dynasty		Whose Line Is It Anyway? (R)		Local programming	
The CW	Summer	Masters of Illusion	**The Big Stage**			Local programming	
The CW	Late summer	Masters of Illusion	**The Big Stage**	**Hypnotize Me** (R)		Local programming	
Fox	Fall	Last Man Standing	**The Cool Kids**	Hell's Kitchen		Local programming	
Fox	Winter	Last Man Standing	**The Cool Kids**	**Proven Innocent**		Local programming	
Fox	Summer	Beat Shazam (R)		MasterChef (R)		Local programming	
Fox	Mid-summer	**First Responders Live** (R)		MasterChef (R)		Local programming	
Fox	Late summer	**BH90210** (R)		MasterChef (R)		Local programming	
NBC	Fall	Blindspot		Midnight, Texas		Dateline NBC	
NBC	Late fall	Midnight, Texas		Dateline NBC			
NBC	Winter	Blindspot		The Blacklist		Dateline NBC	
NBC	Spring	The Blacklist		Dateline NBC			
NBC	Late spring	Blindspot		Dateline NBC			
NBC	Summer	American Ninja Warrior (R)				Dateline NBC	

== Saturday ==
Network		8:00 p.m.	8:30 p.m.	9:00 p.m.	9:30 p.m.	10:00 p.m.	10:30 p.m.
ABC	Fall	ESPN Saturday Night Football					
ABC	Late fall	Encore programming				**The Alec Baldwin Show**	
ABC	Winter	Encore programming					
ABC	Mid-winter	NBA Countdown	NBA Saturday Primetime				
ABC	Summer	Shark Tank (R)		The Good Doctor (R)		20/20 (R)	
ABC	Mid-summer	Shark Tank (R)		Press Your Luck (R)		Card Sharks (R)	
CBS	Fall	Crimetime Saturday				48 Hours	
CBS	Winter	Ransom		Crimetime Saturday		48 Hours	
CBS	Spring	**Million Dollar Mile**		Ransom		48 Hours	
CBS	Late spring	**God Friended Me** (R)		Ransom		48 Hours	
CBS	Summer	**Million Dollar Mile**		48 Hours (R)			
CBS	Late summer	Crimetime Saturday				48 Hours (R)	
Fox	Fall	Fox College Football (continued to game completion)					
Fox	Late fall	Encore programming				Local programming	
Fox	Spring	Baseball Night in America (7:00 p.m.)				Local programming	
Fox	Summer	So You Think You Can Dance (R)		Beat Shazam (R)		Local programming	
NBC	Fall	Dateline Saturday Mystery				SNL Vintage	
NBC	Spring	NHL on NBC					
NBC	Summer	**Songland** (R)		Dateline Saturday Mystery			
NBC	Mid-summer	**Bring the Funny** (R)		Dateline Saturday Mystery			

- Note: NBC aired primetime coverage of Notre Dame college football on September 1, 29, and November 10, the 2019 NHL All-Star Game on January 26, a regional NHL Game of the Week on February 2, the 2019 NHL Stadium Series game on February 23, and first, second, and third round NHL playoff games in April and late May. CBS carried two primetime college football games (the Navy–Notre Dame game and the Alabama–LSU game), the NCAA men's basketball tournament for two Saturdays in late March, and two regional Alliance of American Football games on February 9.
- Note: NBC's Pacific and Mountain Time Zone affiliates carry new episodes of Saturday Night Live in real time with the rest of the United States, placing its airtime within the prime time period throughout this season; a re-air is broadcast after the late local news in those time zones. The network's affiliates in Alaska, Hawaii and other Pacific islands carry the show on delay as usual.
- Note: Fox and ABC's college football package airs live in all time zones, with local programming by affiliates in western time zones after game completion.

== By network ==
=== ABC ===
Returning series:

- 20/20
- The $100,000 Pyramid
- Agents of S.H.I.E.L.D.
- America's Funniest Home Videos
- American Housewife
- American Idol
- The Bachelor
- Bachelor in Paradise
- The Bachelorette
- Black-ish
- Card Sharks (moved from Syndication)
- Celebrity Family Feud
- Child Support
- Dancing with the Stars
- For the People
- Fresh Off the Boat
- The Goldbergs
- The Good Doctor
- The Great American Baking Show
- The Great Christmas Light Fight
- Grey's Anatomy
- How to Get Away with Murder
- Match Game
- Modern Family
- NBA Countdown
- NBA Saturday Primetime
- Press Your Luck (Note: Series revival, previously aired on CBS in 1986.)
- Saturday Night Football
- Shark Tank
- Speechless
- Splitting Up Together
- Station 19
- To Tell the Truth
- What Would You Do?

New series:

- **1969** *
- **The Alec Baldwin Show**
- **Bless This Mess** *
- **The Conners**
- **Dancing with the Stars: Juniors**
- **Family Food Fight** *
- **The Fix** *
- **Grand Hotel** *
- **Holey Moley** *
- **The Kids Are Alright**
- **A Million Little Things**
- **Reef Break** *
- **The Rookie**
- **Schooled** *
- **Single Parents**
- **Videos After Dark** *
- **Whiskey Cavalier** *

Not returning from 2017–18:

- Alex, Inc.
- The Bachelor Winter Games
- Castaways
- The Crossing
- Deception
- Designated Survivor (moved to Netflix)
- The Gong Show
- Inhumans
- Kevin (Probably) Saves the World
- The Last Defense
- The Mayor
- The Middle
- Once Upon a Time
- The Proposal
- Quantico
- Roseanne
- Scandal
- Take Two
- Ten Days in the Valley
- The Toy Box

=== CBS ===
Returning series:

- 48 Hours
- 60 Minutes
- The Amazing Race
- The Big Bang Theory
- Big Brother
- Blue Bloods
- Bull
- Celebrity Big Brother
- Criminal Minds
- Elementary
- Hawaii Five-0
- Instinct
- Life in Pieces
- MacGyver
- Madam Secretary
- Man with a Plan
- Mom
- Murphy Brown (Note: Series revival, previously aired on CBS in 1998.)
- NCIS
- NCIS: Los Angeles
- NCIS: New Orleans
- NFL on CBS
- Ransom
- SEAL Team
- Survivor
- S.W.A.T.
- Whistleblower
- Young Sheldon

New series:

- **Blood & Treasure** *
- **The Code** *
- **Fam** *
- **FBI**
- **God Friended Me**
- **The Good Fight** (Note: U.S. broadcast television premiere; a CBS All Access original series.) *
- **Happy Together**
- **Love Island** *
- **Magnum P.I.**
- **Million Dollar Mile** *
- **The Neighborhood**
- **The Red Line** *
- **The World's Best** *

Not returning from 2017–18:

- 9JKL
- Code Black
- Kevin Can Wait
- Living Biblically
- Me, Myself & I
- Salvation
- Scorpion
- Superior Donuts
- Thursday Night Football (moved to Fox)
- TKO: Total Knock Out
- Wisdom of the Crowd

=== The CW ===
Returning series:

- The 100
- Arrow
- Black Lightning
- Burden of Truth
- Crazy Ex-Girlfriend
- Dynasty
- The Flash
- I Ship It (moved from CW Seed)
- iZombie
- Jane the Virgin
- Legends of Tomorrow
- Masters of Illusion
- My Last Days
- The Outpost
- Penn & Teller: Fool Us
- Riverdale
- Supergirl
- Supernatural
- Whose Line Is It Anyway?

New series:

- **All American**
- **The Big Stage** *
- **Bulletproof** *
- **Charmed**
- **Hypnotize Me** *
- **In the Dark** *
- **Legacies**
- **Mysteries Decoded** *
- **Pandora** *
- **Red Bull Peaking** *
- **Roswell, New Mexico** *
- **Two Sentence Horror Stories** *

Not returning from 2017–18:

- Life Sentence
- The Originals
- Valor

=== Fox ===
Returning series:

- 9-1-1
- Baseball Night in America
- Beat Shazam
- Bob's Burgers
- Empire
- Family Guy
- Fox College Football
- Fox NFL Thursday
- The Gifted
- Gordon Ramsay's 24 Hours to Hell and Back
- Gotham
- Hell's Kitchen
- Last Man Standing (moved from ABC)
- Lethal Weapon
- MasterChef
- MasterChef Junior
- NFL on Fox
- The Orville
- The OT
- Paradise Hotel
- The Resident
- The Simpsons
- So You Think You Can Dance
- Star
- Thursday Night Football (moved from CBS/NBC)

New series:

- **BH90210** *
- **The Cool Kids**
- **First Responders Live** *
- **The Masked Singer** *
- **Mental Samurai** *
- **The Passage** *
- **Proven Innocent** *
- **Rel**
- **Spin the Wheel** *
- **What Just Happened??! with Fred Savage** *

Not returning from 2017–18:

- Brooklyn Nine-Nine (moved to NBC)
- The Exorcist
- Ghosted
- LA to Vegas
- The Last Man on Earth
- Love Connection
- Lucifer (moved to Netflix)
- The Mick
- New Girl
- Showtime at the Apollo
- The X-Files

=== NBC ===
Returning series:

- American Ninja Warrior
- America's Got Talent
- A.P. Bio
- The Blacklist
- Blindspot
- Brooklyn Nine-Nine (moved from Fox)
- Chicago Fire
- Chicago Med
- Chicago P.D.
- Dateline NBC
- Ellen's Game of Games
- Football Night in America
- Good Girls
- The Good Place
- Hollywood Game Night
- Law & Order: Special Victims Unit
- Midnight, Texas
- NBC Sunday Night Football
- NHL on NBC
- Superstore
- This Is Us
- The Voice
- The Wall
- Will & Grace
- World of Dance

New series:

- **Abby's** *
- **America's Got Talent: The Champions** *
- **Bring the Funny** *
- **The Enemy Within** *
- **I Feel Bad**
- **The InBetween** *
- **Manifest**
- **New Amsterdam**
- **Songland** *
- **The Titan Games** *
- **The Village** *

Not returning from 2017–18:

- Better Late Than Never
- The Brave
- Champions
- Genius Junior
- Great News
- Law & Order True Crime
- Making It (returned for 2019–20)
- Marlon
- Reverie
- Rise
- Running Wild with Bear Grylls (moved to National Geographic)
- Shades of Blue
- Taken
- Thursday Night Football (moved to Fox)
- Timeless
- Trial & Error

== Renewals and cancellations ==
=== Full season pickups ===
==== ABC ====
- Grey's Anatomy—Picked up for three additional episodes on January 7, 2019, bringing the episode count to 25.
- The Kids Are Alright—Picked up for a 22-episode full season on November 7, 2018; an additional episode was ordered on December 14, 2018, bringing the episode count to 23.
- A Million Little Things—Picked up for a 17-episode full season on October 26, 2018.
- The Rookie—Picked up for a 20-episode full season on November 5, 2018.
- Single Parents—Picked up for a 22-episode full season on October 17, 2018; an additional episode was ordered on December 14, 2018, bringing the episode count to 23.
- Splitting Up Together—Picked up for five additional episodes on November 7, 2018, bringing the episode count to 18.
- Station 19—Picked up for a 17-episode full season on October 19, 2018.

==== CBS ====
- FBI—Picked up for a 22-episode full season on October 11, 2018.
- God Friended Me—Picked up for a 20-episode full season on October 19, 2018.
- Magnum P.I.—Picked up for a 20-episode full season on October 19, 2018.
- The Neighborhood—Picked up for a 22-episode full season on October 19, 2018.

==== The CW ====
- All American—Picked up for three additional episodes on November 8, 2018, bringing the episode count to 16.
- Charmed—Picked up for a 22-episode full season on November 8, 2018.
- Legacies—Picked up for three additional episodes on November 8, 2018, bringing the episode count to 16.

==== Fox ====
- The Cool Kids—Picked up for a 22-episode full season on October 19, 2018.
- Lethal Weapon—Picked up for two additional episodes on October 12, 2018, bringing the episode count to 15.
- The Resident—Picked up for a 22-episode full season on October 10, 2018.

==== NBC ====
- Brooklyn Nine-Nine—Picked up for five additional episodes on September 7, 2018, bringing the episode count to 18.
- Chicago Fire—Picked up for two additional episodes on December 1, 2018, bringing the episode count to 22.
- Chicago Med—Picked up for two additional episodes on December 1, 2018, bringing the episode count to 22.
- Chicago P.D.—Picked up for two additional episodes on December 1, 2018, bringing the episode count to 22.
- Manifest—Picked up for three additional episodes on October 18, 2018, bringing the episode count to 16.
- New Amsterdam—Picked up for a 22-episode full season on October 10, 2018.

=== Renewals ===
==== ABC ====
- The $100,000 Pyramid—Renewed for a fifth season on November 20, 2019.
- Agents of S.H.I.E.L.D.—Renewed for a seventh and final season on November 16, 2018.
- America's Funniest Home Videos—Renewed for a thirtieth and thirty-first season on October 29, 2018.
- American Housewife—Renewed for a fourth season on May 10, 2019.
- American Idol—Renewed for an eighteenth season on May 13, 2019.
- The Bachelor—Renewed for a twenty-fourth season on May 10, 2019.
- Bachelor in Paradise—Renewed for a seventh season on August 5, 2019.
- The Bachelorette—Renewed for a sixteenth season on August 5, 2019.
- Black-ish—Renewed for a sixth season on May 2, 2019.
- Bless This Mess—Renewed for a second season on May 10, 2019.
- Card Sharks—Renewed for a second season on November 20, 2019.
- Celebrity Family Feud—Renewed for a seventh season on November 20, 2019.
- The Conners—Renewed for a second season on March 22, 2019.
- Dancing with the Stars—Renewed for a twenty-eighth season on February 5, 2019.
- Fresh Off the Boat—Renewed for a sixth and final season on May 10, 2019.
- The Goldbergs—Renewed for a seventh season on May 11, 2019.
- The Good Doctor—Renewed for a third season on February 5, 2019.
- The Great American Baking Show—Renewed for a fifth season on August 1, 2019.
- The Great Christmas Light Fight—Renewed for a seventh season on October 18, 2018.
- Grey's Anatomy—Renewed for a sixteenth and seventeenth season on May 10, 2019.
- Holey Moley—Renewed for a second season on October 10, 2019.
- How to Get Away with Murder—Renewed for a sixth and final season on May 10, 2019.
- Match Game—Renewed for a fifth season on November 20, 2019.
- A Million Little Things—Renewed for a second season on February 5, 2019.
- Modern Family—Renewed for an eleventh and final season on February 5, 2019.
- Press Your Luck—Renewed for a second season on November 20, 2019.
- The Rookie—Renewed for a second season on May 10, 2019.
- Schooled—Renewed for a second season on May 11, 2019.
- Shark Tank—Renewed for an eleventh season on February 5, 2019.
- Single Parents—Renewed for a second season on May 10, 2019.
- Station 19—Renewed for a third season on May 10, 2019.
- To Tell the Truth—Renewed for a fifth season on November 20, 2019.

==== CBS ====
- 48 Hours—Renewed for a thirty-second on May 9, 2019.
- 60 Minutes—Renewed for a fifty-second season on May 9, 2019.
- The Amazing Race—Renewed for a thirty-second season on May 15, 2019.
- Big Brother—Renewed for a twenty-first and twenty-second season on May 15, 2019.
- Blood & Treasure—Renewed for a second season on June 26, 2019. It was announced on May 17, 2022, that the series would be moving to Paramount+.
- Blue Bloods—Renewed for a tenth season on April 12, 2019.
- Bull—Renewed for a fourth season on May 9, 2019.
- Criminal Minds—Renewed for a fifteenth and final season on January 10, 2019.
- FBI—Renewed for a second season on January 25, 2019.
- God Friended Me—Renewed for a second season on January 29, 2019.
- Hawaii Five-0—Renewed for a tenth and final season on May 9, 2019.
- Love Island—Renewed for a second season on August 1, 2019.
- MacGyver—Renewed for a fourth season on May 9, 2019.
- Madam Secretary—Renewed for a sixth and final season on May 9, 2019.
- Magnum P.I.—Renewed for a second season on January 25, 2019.
- Man with a Plan—Renewed for a fourth season on May 10, 2019.
- Mom—Renewed for a seventh and eighth season on February 5, 2019.
- NCIS—Renewed for a seventeenth season on April 11, 2019.
- NCIS: Los Angeles—Renewed for an eleventh season on April 22, 2019.
- NCIS: New Orleans—Renewed for a sixth season on April 22, 2019.
- The Neighborhood—Renewed for a second season on January 25, 2019.
- SEAL Team—Renewed for a third season on May 9, 2019.
- Survivor—Renewed for a thirty-ninth season on May 15, 2019.
- S.W.A.T.—Renewed for third season on May 9, 2019.
- Young Sheldon—Renewed for a third and fourth season on February 22, 2019.

==== The CW ====
- The 100—Renewed for a seventh and final season on April 24, 2019.
- All American—Renewed for a second season on April 24, 2019.
- Arrow—Renewed for an eighth and final season on January 31, 2019.
- Black Lightning—Renewed for a third season on January 31, 2019.
- Bulletproof—Renewed for a second season on March 31, 2020.
- Burden of Truth—Renewed for a third season on May 31, 2019.
- Charmed—Renewed for a second season on January 31, 2019.
- Dynasty—Renewed for a third season on January 31, 2019.
- The Flash—Renewed for a sixth season on January 31, 2019.
- In the Dark—Renewed for a second season on April 24, 2019.
- Legacies—Renewed for a second season on January 31, 2019.
- Legends of Tomorrow—Renewed for a fifth season on January 31, 2019.
- Masters of Illusion—Renewed for a tenth season on March 31, 2020.
- The Outpost—Renewed for a third season on October 14, 2019.
- Pandora—Renewed for a second season on October 17, 2019.
- Penn & Teller: Fool Us—Renewed for a seventh season on March 31, 2020.
- Riverdale—Renewed for a fourth season on January 31, 2019.
- Roswell, New Mexico—Renewed for a second season on April 24, 2019.
- Supergirl—Renewed for a fifth season on January 31, 2019.
- Supernatural—Renewed for a fifteenth and final season on January 31, 2019.
- Two Sentence Horror Stories—Renewed for a second season on May 14, 2020.
- Whose Line Is It Anyway?—Renewed for a sixteenth season on March 26, 2020.

==== Fox ====
- 9-1-1—Renewed for a third season on March 25, 2019.
- Beat Shazam—Renewed for a fourth season on January 31, 2020.
- Bob's Burgers—Renewed for a tenth season on February 12, 2019.
- Empire—Renewed for a sixth and final season on April 30, 2019.
- Family Guy—Renewed for an eighteenth season on February 12, 2019.
- Gordon Ramsay's 24 Hours to Hell and Back—Renewed for a third season on July 26, 2019.
- Hell's Kitchen—Renewed for a nineteenth and twentieth season on February 26, 2019.
- Last Man Standing—Renewed for an eighth season on April 18, 2019.
- The Masked Singer—Renewed for a second season on January 30, 2019 and for a third season on May 13, 2019.
- MasterChef—Renewed for an eleventh season on August 6, 2019.
- MasterChef Junior—Renewed for an eighth season on July 17, 2019.
- Mental Samurai—Renewed for a second season on February 25, 2020.
- The Orville—Renewed for a third season on May 11, 2019. It was announced on July 20, 2019 that the third season will air on Hulu due to production delays.
- The Resident—Renewed for a third season on March 25, 2019.
- The Simpsons—Renewed for a thirty-first and thirty-second season on February 6, 2019.
- So You Think You Can Dance—Renewed for a seventeenth season on February 20, 2020.
- Thursday Night Football—Renewed for a sixth season on January 31, 2018; deal will go to ninth season in 2022.

==== NBC ====
- American Ninja Warrior—Renewed for a twelfth season on May 13, 2019.
- America's Got Talent—Renewed for a fifteenth season on May 13, 2019.
- America's Got Talent: The Champions—Renewed for a second season on May 11, 2019.
- The Blacklist—Renewed for a seventh season on March 11, 2019.
- Blindspot—Renewed for a fifth and final season on May 10, 2019.
- Brooklyn Nine-Nine—Renewed for a seventh season on February 27, 2019.
- Chicago Fire—Renewed for an eighth season on February 26, 2019.
- Chicago Med—Renewed for a fifth season on February 26, 2019.
- Chicago P.D.—Renewed for a seventh season on February 26, 2019.
- Ellen's Game of Games—Renewed for a third season on January 16, 2019.
- Football Night in America—Renewed for a fourteenth season on December 14, 2011.
- Good Girls—Renewed for a third season on April 12, 2019.
- The Good Place—Renewed for a fourth and final season on December 4, 2018.
- Law & Order: Special Victims Unit—Renewed for a twenty-first season on March 29, 2019.
- Little Big Shots—Renewed for a fourth season on May 12, 2019.
- Manifest—Renewed for a second season on April 15, 2019.
- NBC Sunday Night Football—Renewed for a fourteenth season on December 14, 2011; deal will go to seventeenth season in 2022.
- New Amsterdam—Renewed for a second season on February 4, 2019.
- Songland—Renewed for a second season on September 10, 2019.
- Superstore—Renewed for a fifth season on March 4, 2019.
- This Is Us—Renewed for a fourth, fifth and sixth season on May 12, 2019.
- The Titan Games—Renewed for a second season on September 16, 2019.
- The Voice—Renewed for a seventeenth season on May 10, 2019.
- Will & Grace—Renewed for an eleventh and final season on March 17, 2018.
- World of Dance—Renewed for a fourth season on May 11, 2019.

=== Cancellations/series endings ===
==== ABC ====
- 1969—The miniseries was meant to run for one season only; it concluded on May 28, 2019.
- The Alec Baldwin Show—On January 4, 2019, ABC pulled the series from its prime-time schedule.
- Child Support—The series concluded on December 14, 2018.
- Dancing with the Stars: Juniors—Canceled on September 8, 2019.
- The Fix—Canceled on May 10, 2019. The series concluded on May 20, 2019.
- For the People—Canceled on May 9, 2019, after two seasons. The series concluded on May 16, 2019.
- Grand Hotel—Canceled on October 1, 2019.
- The Kids Are Alright—Canceled on May 10, 2019. The series concluded on May 21, 2019.
- Reef Break—Canceled on December 13, 2019.
- Speechless—Canceled on May 10, 2019, after three seasons.
- Splitting Up Together—Canceled on May 10, 2019, after two seasons.
- Whiskey Cavalier—Canceled on May 12, 2019. The series concluded on May 22, 2019.

==== CBS ====
- The Big Bang Theory—It was announced on August 22, 2018, that season twelve would be the final season. The series concluded on May 16, 2019.
- The Code—Canceled on July 23, 2019.
- Elementary—It was announced on December 17, 2018, that season seven would be the final season. The series concluded on August 15, 2019.
- Fam—Canceled on May 10, 2019.
- The Good Fight—It was announced on January 12, 2020, that CBS has no plans to air further rerun episodes of the series beyond its first season.
- Happy Together—Canceled on May 10, 2019.
- Instinct—Canceled on August 17, 2019, after two seasons. The series concluded on August 25, 2019.
- Life in Pieces—Canceled on May 10, 2019, after four seasons. The series concluded on June 27, 2019.
- Million Dollar Mile—The series concluded on August 3, 2019.
- Murphy Brown—Canceled on May 10, 2019.
- Ransom—Canceled on July 3, 2019, after three seasons.
- The Red Line—Canceled on June 7, 2019.

==== The CW ====
- Crazy Ex-Girlfriend—It was announced on April 2, 2018 that season four would be the final season. The series concluded on April 5, 2019.
- I Ship It—On August 28, 2019, The CW pulled the show from its schedule and announced that no further episodes would air on the network. The remaining episodes were made available on CW Seed on the same day.
- iZombie—It was announced on May 17, 2018 that season five would be the final season. The series concluded on August 1, 2019.
- Jane the Virgin—It was announced on May 17, 2018 that season five would be the final season. The series concluded on July 31, 2019.

==== Fox ====
- BH90210—Canceled on November 7, 2019.
- The Cool Kids—Canceled on May 10, 2019. The series concluded the same day.
- The Gifted—Canceled on April 17, 2019, after two seasons.
- Gotham—It was announced on May 13, 2018 that season five would be the final season. The series concluded on April 25, 2019.
- Lethal Weapon—Canceled on May 10, 2019, after three seasons.
- Paradise Hotel—Canceled on August 7, 2019.
- The Passage—Canceled on May 10, 2019.
- Proven Innocent—Canceled on May 11, 2019.
- Rel—Canceled on April 17, 2019.
- Star—Canceled on May 10, 2019, after three seasons.
- What Just Happened??! with Fred Savage—It was announced on August 8, 2019 that according to low ratings, a second season of the series was highly unlikely, rendering it as a de facto cancellation. The series concluded on September 1, 2019.

==== NBC ====
- A.P. Bio—Canceled on May 24, 2019, after two seasons. Final episode aired on NBC on June 13, 2019. On July 17, 2019, it was announced that Peacock would pick up the series for another season.
- Abby's—Canceled on May 30, 2019. The series concluded on June 13, 2019.
- The Enemy Within—Canceled on May 30, 2019.
- I Feel Bad—Canceled on May 10, 2019.
- The InBetween—Canceled on November 1, 2019.
- Midnight, Texas—Canceled on December 21, 2018, after two seasons, making it the first official cancellation of the season.
- The Village—Canceled on May 30, 2019.

== See also ==
- 2018–19 Canadian network television schedule
- 2018–19 United States network television schedule (daytime)
- 2018–19 United States network television schedule (late night)
