= 2017–18 United States network television schedule =

Television schedule for the fall of 2017

The 2017–18 network television schedule for the five major English-language commercial broadcast networks that air in the United States covers the prime time hours from September 2017 to August 2018. The schedule is followed by a list per network of returning series, new series, and series canceled after the 2016–17 season.

NBC was the first to announce its fall schedule, on May 14, 2017, followed by Fox on May 15, ABC on May 16, CBS on May 17, and The CW on May 18, 2017. NBC adjusted its schedule on May 30, 2017.

PBS is not included; member television stations have local flexibility over most of their schedules and broadcast times for network shows may vary. Ion Television, The CW Plus, and MyNetworkTV are also not included since the networks' schedules consist of syndicated reruns (with limited original programming on the latter two). The CW does not air network programming on weekend nights. However, they would return to programming a two-hour Sunday night schedule the following season.

New series are highlighted in bold.

All times are U.S. Eastern and Pacific Time (except for some live sports or events). Subtract one hour for Central, Mountain, Alaska, and Hawaii–Aleutian times.

Note: From February 7 to February 25, 2018, all NBC primetime programming was pre-empted for coverage of the 2018 Winter Olympics in Pyeongchang, South Korea.

Each of the 30 highest-rated shows is listed with its rank and rating as determined by Nielsen Media Research.

== Legend ==
- Light blue indicates local programming.
- Gray indicates encore programming.
- Blue-gray indicates news programming.
- Light green indicates sporting events.
- Light purple indicates movies.
- Red indicates series being burned off and other irregularly scheduled programs, including specials.
- Yellow indicates the top-10 most watched programs of the season.
- Cyan indicates the top-20 most watched programs of the season.
- Magenta indicates the top-30 most watched programs of the season.

== Sunday ==
Network		7:00 p.m.	7:30 p.m.	8:00 p.m.	8:30 p.m.	9:00 p.m.	9:30 p.m.	10:00 p.m.	10:30 p.m.
ABC	Fall	The Toy Box		America's Funniest Home Videos		Shark Tank		**Ten Days in the Valley**	
ABC	Late fall	The Toy Box		America's Funniest Home Videos		Shark Tank			
ABC	Winter	America's Funniest Home Videos				Shark Tank			
ABC	Late winter	America's Funniest Home Videos		American Idol				**Deception**	
ABC	Spring	America's Funniest Home Videos		American Idol				**Deception**	
ABC	Late spring	America's Funniest Home Videos		Celebrity Family Feud		The $100,000 Pyramid		To Tell the Truth	
ABC	Summer	America's Funniest Home Videos		Celebrity Family Feud		The $100,000 Pyramid		To Tell the Truth	
CBS	Fall	NFL on CBS (4:25 p.m.)	60 Minutes (12/7.1) (Tied with The Voice and Grey's Anatomy)		**Wisdom of the Crowd**		NCIS: Los Angeles (19/6.6) (Tied with Chicago Med)		Madam Secretary (continued until 11:30 p.m.) (30/5.6) (Tied with American Idol and Law & Order: Special Victims Unit)
CBS	Winter	60 Minutes (12/7.1) (Tied with The Voice and Grey's Anatomy)		**Celebrity Big Brother**		NCIS: Los Angeles (19/6.6) (Tied with Chicago Med)		Madam Secretary (30/5.6) (Tied with American Idol and Law & Order: Special Victims Unit)	
CBS	Spring	60 Minutes (12/7.1) (Tied with The Voice and Grey's Anatomy)		**Instinct** (23/6.1) (Tied with SEAL Team)		NCIS: Los Angeles (19/6.6) (Tied with Chicago Med)		Madam Secretary (30/5.6) (Tied with American Idol and Law & Order: Special Victims Unit)	
CBS	Summer	60 Minutes (12/7.1) (Tied with The Voice and Grey's Anatomy)		Big Brother		NCIS: Los Angeles (19/6.6) (Tied with Chicago Med)		NCIS: Los Angeles (R)	
Fox	Fall	Fox NFL (4:25 p.m.)	Bob's Burgers	The Simpsons	**Ghosted**	Family Guy	The Last Man on Earth	Local programming	
Fox	Winter	Brooklyn Nine-Nine (R)	Bob's Burgers	The Simpsons	**Ghosted**	Family Guy	**LA to Vegas** (R)	Local programming	
Fox	Spring	Bob's Burgers (R)	Bob's Burgers	The Simpsons	Brooklyn Nine-Nine	Family Guy	The Last Man on Earth	Local programming	
Fox	Summer	**One Strange Rock** (R)		The Simpsons	Bob's Burgers (R)	Family Guy	**Ghosted**	Local programming	
Fox	Late summer	Various programming		The Simpsons	Bob's Burgers (R)	Family Guy	Family Guy (R)	Local programming	
NBC	Fall	Football Night in America		NBC Sunday Night Football (8:20 p.m.) (continued to game completion) (2/10.3) (Tied with NCIS)					
NBC	Winter	Various programming							
NBC	Spring	Dateline NBC		Little Big Shots		**Genius Junior**		Timeless	
NBC	Summer	Dateline NBC		America's Got Talent (R)				Shades of Blue	
NBC	Mid-summer	Running Wild with Bear Grylls		America's Got Talent (R)				Shades of Blue	
NBC	Late summer	Little Big Shots (R)		America's Got Talent (R)				Shades of Blue	

== Monday ==
Network		8:00 p.m.	8:30 p.m.	9:00 p.m.	9:30 p.m.	10:00 p.m.	10:30 p.m.
ABC	Fall	Dancing with the Stars (15/6.9)				**The Good Doctor** (7/9.3)	
ABC	Late fall	The Great Christmas Light Fight				**The Good Doctor** (7/9.3)	
ABC	Winter	The Bachelor				**The Good Doctor** (7/9.3)	
ABC	Late winter	American Idol (30/5.6) (Tied with Madam Secretary and Law & Order: Special Victims Unit)				**The Good Doctor** (7/9.3)	
ABC	Spring	American Idol (30/5.6) (Tied with Madam Secretary and Law & Order: Special Victims Unit)				**The Crossing**	
ABC	Mid-spring	Dancing with the Stars: Athletes (25/6.0) (Tied with Criminal Minds and 9-1-1)				**The Crossing**	
ABC	Late spring	The Bachelorette				**The Proposal**	
ABC	Summer	Bachelor in Paradise				**The Proposal**	
CBS	Fall	The Big Bang Theory (1/11.1)	**9JKL**	Kevin Can Wait	**Me, Myself & I**	Scorpion	
CBS	Mid-fall	Kevin Can Wait	Man with a Plan	Superior Donuts	**9JKL**	Scorpion	
CBS	Winter	**Celebrity Big Brother**		Superior Donuts	**9JKL**	Scorpion	
CBS	Late winter	Kevin Can Wait	Man with a Plan	Superior Donuts	**Living Biblically**	Scorpion	
CBS	Spring	Kevin Can Wait	Man with a Plan	Superior Donuts	The Big Bang Theory (R)	Elementary	
CBS	Summer	Mom (R)	Man with a Plan	Salvation		Elementary	
CBS	Mid-summer	Mom (R)	Life in Pieces (R)	Salvation		Elementary	
The CW	Fall	Supergirl		**Valor**		Local programming	
The CW	Winter	Legends of Tomorrow		iZombie		Local programming	
The CW	Spring	Supergirl		iZombie		Local programming	
The CW	Summer	Supergirl		Whose Line Is It Anyway?	Whose Line Is It Anyway? (R)	Local programming	
The CW	Mid-summer	Penn & Teller: Fool Us		Whose Line Is It Anyway?	Whose Line Is It Anyway? (R)	Local programming	
Fox	Fall	Lucifer		**The Gifted**		Local programming	
Fox	Winter	Lucifer		**The Resident**		Local programming	
Fox	Spring	Lucifer		**The Resident**		Local programming	
Fox	Summer	So You Think You Can Dance		**9-1-1** (R)		Local programming	
Fox	Late summer	So You Think You Can Dance				Local programming	
NBC	Fall	The Voice (12/7.1) (Tied with 60 Minutes and Grey's Anatomy)				**The Brave**	
NBC	Winter	The Wall		Better Late Than Never		**The Brave**	
NBC	Late winter	The Voice (12/7.1) (Tied with 60 Minutes and Grey's Anatomy)				**Good Girls**	
NBC	Spring	The Voice (12/7.1) (Tied with 60 Minutes and Grey's Anatomy)				Running Wild with Bear Grylls	
NBC	Summer	Running Wild with Bear Grylls		American Ninja Warrior			
NBC	Mid-summer	American Ninja Warrior				Dateline NBC	
NBC	Late summer	American Ninja Warrior				America's Got Talent (R)	

== Tuesday ==
Network		8:00 p.m.	8:30 p.m.	9:00 p.m.	9:30 p.m.	10:00 p.m.	10:30 p.m.
ABC	Fall	The Middle	Fresh Off the Boat	Black-ish	**The Mayor**	**Kevin (Probably) Saves the World**	
ABC	Winter	The Middle	Fresh Off the Boat	Black-ish	Modern Family (R)	**Kevin (Probably) Saves the World**	
ABC	Mid-winter	**The Bachelor Winter Games**				**Kevin (Probably) Saves the World**	
ABC	Late winter	The Middle	Fresh Off the Boat	Black-ish	Modern Family (R)	**For the People**	
ABC	Spring	Roseanne (4/10.2) (Tied with This Is Us)	The Middle	Black-ish	**Splitting Up Together**	**For the People**	
ABC	Summer	The Middle (R)	The Middle	Black-ish	Black-ish (R)	**The Last Defense**	
ABC	Late summer	Bachelor in Paradise				**Castaways**	
CBS	Fall	NCIS (2/10.3) (Tied with Sunday Night Football)		Bull (8/8.9)		NCIS: New Orleans (11/7.8)	
CBS	Winter	NCIS (2/10.3) (Tied with Sunday Night Football)		Bull (8/8.9)		NCIS: New Orleans (11/7.8)	
CBS	Spring	NCIS (2/10.3) (Tied with Sunday Night Football)		Bull (8/8.9)		NCIS: New Orleans (11/7.8)	
CBS	Summer	NCIS (2/10.3) (Tied with Sunday Night Football)		Bull (8/8.9)		48 Hours: NCIS	
CBS	Mid-summer	NCIS (2/10.3) (Tied with Sunday Night Football)		Bull (8/8.9)		NCIS: New Orleans (R)	
The CW	Fall	The Flash		Legends of Tomorrow		Local programming	
The CW	Winter	The Flash		**Black Lightning**		Local programming	
The CW	Spring	The Flash		The 100		Local programming	
The CW	Summer	The 100		**The Outpost**		Local programming	
The CW	Late summer	The Flash (R)		**The Outpost**		Local programming	
Fox	Fall	Lethal Weapon		The Mick	Brooklyn Nine-Nine	Local programming	
Fox	Winter	Lethal Weapon		**LA to Vegas**	The Mick	Local programming	
Fox	Spring	Lethal Weapon		**LA to Vegas**	New Girl	Local programming	
Fox	Summer	Beat Shazam		Love Connection		Local programming	
NBC	Fall	The Voice (16/6.8) (Tied with Hawaii Five-0)		This Is Us (4/10.2) (Tied with Roseanne)		**Law & Order True Crime: The Menendez Murders**	
NBC	Mid-fall	The Voice (16/6.8) (Tied with Hawaii Five-0)		This Is Us (4/10.2) (Tied with Roseanne)		Chicago Med (19/6.6) (Tied with NCIS: Los Angeles)	
NBC	Winter	**Ellen's Game of Games**		This Is Us (4/10.2) (Tied with Roseanne)		Chicago Med (19/6.6) (Tied with NCIS: Los Angeles)	
NBC	Spring	The Voice (16/6.8) (Tied with Hawaii Five-0)		**Rise**		Chicago Med (19/6.6) (Tied with NCIS: Los Angeles)	
NBC	Late spring	America's Got Talent				World of Dance	
NBC	Summer	America's Got Talent				**Making It**	

== Wednesday ==
Network		8:00 p.m.	8:30 p.m.	9:00 p.m.	9:30 p.m.	10:00 p.m.	10:30 p.m.
ABC	Fall	The Goldbergs	Speechless	Modern Family	American Housewife	Designated Survivor	
ABC	Winter	The Goldbergs	Speechless	Modern Family	American Housewife	Match Game	
ABC	Mid-winter	The Goldbergs	Speechless	Modern Family	American Housewife	Designated Survivor	
ABC	Spring	The Goldbergs	**Alex, Inc.**	Modern Family	American Housewife	Designated Survivor	
ABC	Summer	The Goldbergs	The Goldbergs (R)	Modern Family	American Housewife	Shark Tank (R)	
ABC	Late summer	The Goldbergs	American Housewife (R)	Modern Family	American Housewife	Shark Tank (R)	
CBS	Fall	Survivor: Heroes vs. Healers vs. Hustlers (28/5.9)		**SEAL Team** (23/6.1) (Tied with Instinct)		Criminal Minds (25/6.0) (Tied with 9-1-1 and Dancing with the Stars: Athletes)	
CBS	Winter	The Amazing Race		**SEAL Team** (23/6.1) (Tied with Instinct)		Criminal Minds (25/6.0) (Tied with 9-1-1 and Dancing with the Stars: Athletes)	
CBS	Mid-winter	**Celebrity Big Brother**		The Amazing Race			
CBS	Spring	Survivor: Ghost Island (28/5.9)		**SEAL Team** (23/6.1) (Tied with Instinct)		Criminal Minds (25/6.0) (Tied with 9-1-1 and Dancing with the Stars: Athletes)	
CBS	Late spring	Survivor: Ghost Island (28/5.9)		**SEAL Team** (23/6.1) (Tied with Instinct)		Code Black	
CBS	Summer	Big Brother		**TKO: Total Knock Out**		Code Black	
CBS	Late summer	Big Brother		**SEAL Team** (R)		Criminal Minds (R)	
The CW	Fall	Riverdale		**Dynasty**		Local programming	
The CW	Winter	Riverdale		**Dynasty**		Local programming	
The CW	Spring	Riverdale		**Life Sentence**		Local programming	
The CW	Late spring	Riverdale		The Originals		Local programming	
The CW	Summer	**Burden of Truth**		The Originals		Local programming	
The CW	Late summer	**Burden of Truth**		Supergirl (R)		Local programming	
Fox	Fall	Empire		Star		Local programming	
Fox	Winter	The X-Files		**9-1-1** (25/6.0) (Tied with Criminal Minds and Dancing with the Stars: Athletes)		Local programming	
Fox	Spring	Empire		Star		Local programming	
Fox	Summer	MasterChef		**Gordon Ramsay's 24 Hours to Hell and Back**		Local programming	
Fox	Late summer	MasterChef				Local programming	
NBC	Fall	The Blacklist		Law & Order: Special Victims Unit (30/5.6) (Tied with Madam Secretary and American Idol)		Chicago P.D. (21/6.5)	
NBC	Winter	The Blacklist		Law & Order: Special Victims Unit (30/5.6) (Tied with Madam Secretary and American Idol)		Chicago P.D. (21/6.5)	
NBC	Spring	The Blacklist		Law & Order: Special Victims Unit (30/5.6) (Tied with Madam Secretary and American Idol)		Chicago P.D. (21/6.5)	
NBC	Summer	American Ninja Warrior				**Reverie**	
NBC	Mid-summer	World of Dance				**Reverie**	
NBC	Late summer	America's Got Talent		World of Dance			

== Thursday ==
Network		8:00 p.m.	8:30 p.m.	9:00 p.m.	9:30 p.m.	10:00 p.m.	10:30 p.m.
ABC	Fall	Grey's Anatomy (12/7.1) (Tied with The Voice and 60 Minutes)		Scandal		How to Get Away with Murder	
ABC	Winter	**The Bachelor Winter Games**				How to Get Away with Murder	
ABC	Late winter	Grey's Anatomy (12/7.1) (Tied with The Voice and 60 Minutes)		Scandal		How to Get Away with Murder	
ABC	Spring	Grey's Anatomy (12/7.1) (Tied with The Voice and 60 Minutes)		**Station 19**		Scandal	
ABC	Mid-spring	Grey's Anatomy (12/7.1) (Tied with The Voice and 60 Minutes)		**Station 19**		Quantico	
ABC	Summer	The Gong Show		Match Game		**Take Two**	
CBS	Fall	NFL Thursday Night Kickoff	Thursday Night Football (continued to game completion) (9/8.5)				
CBS	Mid-fall	The Big Bang Theory (1/11.5)	**Young Sheldon** (6/9.5)	Mom (18/6.7)	Life in Pieces	**S.W.A.T.** (29/5.8)	
CBS	Winter	The Big Bang Theory (1/11.5)	**Young Sheldon** (6/9.5)	Mom (18/6.7)	Life in Pieces	**S.W.A.T.** (29/5.8)	
CBS	Spring	The Big Bang Theory (1/11.5)	**Young Sheldon** (6/9.5)	Mom (18/6.7)	Life in Pieces	**S.W.A.T.** (29/5.8)	
CBS	Summer	The Big Bang Theory (1/11.5)	**Young Sheldon** (6/9.5)	Big Brother		**S.W.A.T.** (29/5.8)	
The CW	Fall	Supernatural		Arrow		Local programming	
The CW	Winter	Supernatural		Arrow		Local programming	
The CW	Spring	Supernatural		Arrow		Local programming	
The CW	Summer	Supernatural		**Black Lightning** (R)		Local programming	
The CW	Late summer	Supernatural		The Originals (R)		Local programming	
Fox	Fall	Gotham		**The Orville**		Local programming	
Fox	Winter	**The Four: Battle for Stardom**				Local programming	
Fox	Spring	Gotham		**Showtime at the Apollo**		Local programming	
Fox	Summer	**The Four: Battle for Stardom**				Local programming	
Fox	Late summer	MasterChef (R)		**The Gifted** (R)		Local programming	
NBC	Fall	Superstore	The Good Place	Will & Grace	Great News	Chicago Fire (22/6.2)	
NBC	Mid-fall	Football Night in America	Thursday Night Football (continued to game completion) (9/8.5)				
NBC	Winter	Superstore	The Good Place	Will & Grace	Great News	Chicago Fire (22/6.2)	
NBC	Mid-winter	Superstore	**A.P. Bio**	Will & Grace	**Champions**	Chicago Fire (22/6.2)	
NBC	Spring	Superstore	**A.P. Bio**	Will & Grace	**Champions**	Chicago Fire (22/6.2)	
NBC	Summer	Little Big Shots		Marlon		Law & Order: Special Victims Unit (R)	
NBC	Late summer	**Ellen's Game of Games** (R)		Trial & Error		Law & Order: Special Victims Unit (R)	

=== Notes ===
- On both CBS and NBC, Thursday Night Kickoff and Football Night in... started at 7:30 p.m. ET out of primetime depending on the network carrying the game, preempting local programming. NBC's scheduling for the NFL's Kickoff Game and Thanksgiving night game was under the different Sunday Night Football package and game coverage filled the entirety of primetime.

== Friday ==
Network		8:00 p.m.	8:30 p.m.	9:00 p.m.	9:30 p.m.	10:00 p.m.	10:30 p.m.
ABC	Fall	Once Upon a Time		**Inhumans**		20/20	
ABC	Late fall	Once Upon a Time		Agents of S.H.I.E.L.D.		20/20	
ABC	Winter	**Child Support**		Agents of S.H.I.E.L.D.		20/20	
ABC	Late winter	Once Upon a Time		Agents of S.H.I.E.L.D.		20/20	
ABC	Spring	Once Upon a Time		Agents of S.H.I.E.L.D.		20/20	
ABC	Late spring	Quantico		What Would You Do?		20/20	
ABC	Summer	Quantico		What Would You Do?		20/20	
ABC	Late summer	Fresh Off the Boat (R)	Speechless (R)	What Would You Do?		20/20	
CBS	Fall	MacGyver		Hawaii Five-0 (16/6.8) (Tied with The Voice)		Blue Bloods (10/8.2)	
CBS	Winter	**Celebrity Big Brother**				Blue Bloods (10/8.2)	
CBS	Spring	MacGyver		Hawaii Five-0 (16/6.8) (Tied with The Voice)		Blue Bloods (10/8.2)	
CBS	Summer	**Celebrity Undercover Boss**		Hawaii Five-0 (16/6.8) (Tied with The Voice)		Blue Bloods (10/8.2)	
CBS	Mid-summer	**Whistleblower**		Hawaii Five-0 (16/6.8) (Tied with The Voice)		Blue Bloods (10/8.2)	
CBS	Late summer	**TKO: Total Knock Out**		**Whistleblower**		Blue Bloods (10/8.2)	
The CW	Fall	Crazy Ex-Girlfriend		Jane the Virgin		Local programming	
The CW	Winter	Crazy Ex-Girlfriend		Jane the Virgin		Local programming	
The CW	Spring	**Dynasty**		Jane the Virgin		Local programming	
The CW	Late spring	**Dynasty**		**Life Sentence**		Local programming	
The CW	Summer	My Last Days		**Life Sentence**		Local programming	
The CW	Mid-summer	Masters of Illusion		Penn & Teller: Fool Us (R)		Local programming	
Fox	Fall	Hell's Kitchen		The Exorcist		Local programming	
Fox	Winter	Hell's Kitchen		Encore programming		Local programming	
Fox	Spring	MasterChef Junior		Encore programming		Local programming	
Fox	Summer	**Phenoms**				Local programming	
Fox	Mid-summer	**The Resident** (R)		**The Orville** (R)		Local programming	
NBC	Fall	Blindspot		Dateline NBC			
NBC	Winter	Blindspot		Taken		Dateline NBC	
NBC	Spring	Blindspot		Dateline NBC			
NBC	Summer	American Ninja Warrior (R)				Dateline NBC (R)	

== Saturday ==
Network		8:00 p.m.	8:30 p.m.	9:00 p.m.	9:30 p.m.	10:00 p.m.	10:30 p.m.
ABC	Fall	ESPN Saturday Night Football					
ABC	Late fall	Encore/Holiday programming				**Ten Days in the Valley**	
ABC	Winter	NBA Countdown	NBA Saturday Primetime				
ABC	Spring	NBA Countdown	NBA Saturday Primetime				
ABC	Summer	America's Funniest Home Videos (R)		20/20 (R)			
ABC	Late summer	**The Good Doctor** (R)		20/20 (R)			
CBS	Fall	Crimetime Saturday				48 Hours	
CBS	Winter	Crimetime Saturday				48 Hours	
CBS	Spring	Ransom		Crimetime Saturday		48 Hours	
CBS	Summer	**Me, Myself & I**		**Living Biblically**		48 Hours	
CBS	Mid-summer	**Pink Collar Crimes**		48 Hours (R)			
Fox	Fall	Fox College Football					
Fox	Winter	Encore programming				Local programming	
Fox	Spring	Baseball Night in America				Local programming	
Fox	Summer	Encore programming				Local programming	
NBC	Fall	Dateline Saturday Mystery				SNL Vintage	
NBC	Winter	Dateline Saturday Mystery				SNL Vintage	
NBC	Spring	NHL on NBC					
NBC	Summer	Taken		Dateline Saturday Mystery			
NBC	Mid-summer	Various programming		Dateline Saturday Mystery			
NBC	Late summer	America's Got Talent (R)				Dateline Saturday Mystery (R)	

=== Notes ===
- NBC carried primetime coverage of Notre Dame college football on September 9 and October 21, along with a special Sunday Night Football game on December, a January 2018 NFL Wild Card, the NHL Stadium Series on March 3, the first, second and third round NHL playoff games in April and late May and the 2018 Coke Zero Sugar 400 on July 7, while CBS carried one SEC college football game in November, and the NCAA men's basketball tournament in late March and Fox carried five Ultimate Fighting Championship fights on December 16, January 27, February 24, April 14 and July 28, and the 2018 Toyota Owners 400 on April 21.
- NBC's Pacific and Mountain Time Zone affiliates carry new episodes of Saturday Night Live in real time with the rest of the United States, placing its airtime within the prime time period throughout this season (except for the February 3 episode due to the commitments to carry the 7th NFL Honors); a re-air is broadcast after the late local news in those time zones. The network's affiliates in Alaska, Hawaii and other Pacific islands carry the show on delay as usual.

== By network ==
=== ABC ===
Returning series:

- 20/20
- The $100,000 Pyramid
- Agents of S.H.I.E.L.D.
- America's Funniest Home Videos
- American Housewife
- American Idol (Note: Series revival, previously aired by Fox from 2002 to 2016.)
- The Bachelor
- Bachelor in Paradise
- The Bachelorette
- Black-ish
- Celebrity Family Feud
- Dancing with the Stars
- Designated Survivor
- Fresh Off the Boat
- The Goldbergs
- The Gong Show
- The Great American Baking Show
- The Great Christmas Light Fight
- Grey's Anatomy
- How to Get Away with Murder
- Match Game
- The Middle
- Modern Family
- NBA Saturday Primetime
- Once Upon a Time
- Quantico
- Roseanne (Note: Series revival, previously aired on ABC from 1988 to 1997.)
- Saturday Night Football
- Scandal
- Shark Tank
- Speechless
- To Tell the Truth
- The Toy Box
- What Would You Do?

New series:

- **Alex, Inc.** *
- **The Bachelor Winter Games** *
- **Castaways** *
- **Child Support** *
- **The Crossing** *
- **Deception** *
- **For the People** *
- **The Good Doctor**
- **Inhumans**
- **Kevin (Probably) Saves the World**
- **The Last Defense** *
- **The Mayor**
- **The Proposal** *
- **Splitting Up Together** *
- **Station 19** *
- **Take Two** *
- **Ten Days in the Valley**

Not returning from 2016–17:

- 20/20: In an Instant
- ABC Saturday Movie of the Week
- American Crime
- Big Fan
- Boy Band
- The Catch
- Conviction
- Downward Dog
- Dr. Ken
- Imaginary Mary
- Last Man Standing (moved to Fox in 2018–19)
- Notorious
- The Real O'Neals
- Secrets and Lies
- Somewhere Between
- Steve Harvey's Funderdome
- Time After Time
- When We Rise

=== CBS ===
Returning series:

- 48 Hours
- 48 Hours: NCIS
- 60 Minutes
- The Amazing Race
- The Big Bang Theory
- Big Brother
- Blue Bloods
- Bull
- Code Black
- Criminal Minds
- Hawaii Five-0
- Kevin Can Wait
- Life in Pieces
- MacGyver
- Madam Secretary
- Man with a Plan
- Mom
- NCIS
- NCIS: Los Angeles
- NCIS: New Orleans
- Ransom
- Salvation
- Scorpion
- Superior Donuts
- Survivor
- Thursday Night Football

New series:

- **9JKL**
- **Celebrity Big Brother** *
- **Instinct** *
- **Living Biblically** *
- **Me, Myself & I**
- **Pink Collar Crimes** *
- **SEAL Team**
- **S.W.A.T.**
- **TKO: Total Knock Out** *
- **Whistleblower** *
- **Wisdom of the Crowd**
- **Young Sheldon**

Not returning from 2016–17:

- 2 Broke Girls
- Candy Crush
- Criminal Minds: Beyond Borders
- Doubt
- The Great Indoors
- Hunted
- The Odd Couple
- Pure Genius
- Training Day
- Undercover Boss (returned for 2019–20)
- Zoo

=== The CW ===
Returning series:

- The 100
- Arrow
- Crazy Ex-Girlfriend
- The Flash
- iZombie
- Jane the Virgin
- Legends of Tomorrow
- Masters of Illusion
- My Last Days
- The Originals
- Penn & Teller: Fool Us
- Riverdale
- Supergirl
- Supernatural
- Whose Line Is It Anyway?

New series:

- **Black Lightning** *
- **Burden of Truth** *
- **Dynasty**
- **Life Sentence** *
- **The Outpost** *
- **Valor**

Not returning from 2016–17:

- Frequency
- Hooten & the Lady
- No Tomorrow
- Reign
- The Vampire Diaries

=== Fox ===
Returning series:

- Beat Shazam
- Bob's Burgers
- Brooklyn Nine-Nine
- Empire
- The Exorcist
- Family Guy
- Fox College Football
- Gotham
- Hell's Kitchen
- The Last Man on Earth
- Lethal Weapon
- Love Connection
- Lucifer
- MasterChef
- MasterChef Junior
- The Mick
- New Girl
- NFL on Fox
- The Simpsons
- So You Think You Can Dance
- Star
- The X-Files

New series:

- **9-1-1** *
- **The Four: Battle for Stardom** *
- **Ghosted**
- **The Gifted**
- **Gordon Ramsay's 24 Hours to Hell and Back** *
- **LA to Vegas** *
- **One Strange Rock** (Note: Encores of National Geographic Channel series) *
- **The Orville**
- **Phenoms** *
- **The Resident** *
- **Showtime at the Apollo** *

Not returning from 2016–17:

- 24: Legacy
- APB
- Bones
- Making History
- Pitch
- Rosewood
- Scream Queens
- Shots Fired
- Sleepy Hollow
- Son of Zorn
- You the Jury

=== NBC ===
Returning series:

- American Ninja Warrior
- America's Got Talent
- Better Late Than Never
- The Blacklist
- Blindspot
- Chicago Fire
- Chicago Med
- Chicago P.D.
- Dateline NBC
- Football Night in America
- The Good Place
- Great News
- Hollywood Game Night
- Law & Order: Special Victims Unit
- Little Big Shots
- Marlon
- NBC Sunday Night Football
- Running Wild with Bear Grylls
- Shades of Blue
- Superstore
- Taken
- This Is Us
- Thursday Night Football
- Timeless
- Trial & Error
- The Voice
- The Wall
- Will & Grace (Note: Series revival, previously aired by NBC in 2006.)
- World of Dance

New series:

- **A.P. Bio** *
- **The Awesome Show**
- **The Brave**
- **Champions** *
- **Ellen's Game of Games**
- **Genius Junior** *
- **Good Girls** *
- **Law & Order True Crime**
- **Making It** *
- **Reverie** *
- **Rise** *

Not returning from 2016–17:

- The Apprentice
- The Blacklist: Redemption
- The Carmichael Show
- Caught on Camera with Nick Cannon
- Chicago Justice
- Emerald City
- Grimm
- Midnight, Texas (returned for 2018–19)
- The Night Shift
- Powerless

== Renewals and cancellations ==
=== Full season pickups ===
==== ABC ====
- The Good Doctor—Picked up for an 18-episode full season on October 3, 2017.
- Kevin (Probably) Saves the World—Picked up for three additional episodes on November 10, 2017, bringing the episode count up to 16.

==== CBS ====
- 9JKL—Picked up for three additional episodes on November 17, 2017, bringing the episode count up to 16.
- Elementary—Picked up for eight additional episodes, bringing the order to 21 episodes on November 29, 2017.
- Kevin Can Wait—Picked up for an additional two episodes on December 1, 2017, bringing the episode count up to 24.
- Man with a Plan—Picked up for a 21-episode full season on November 27, 2017.
- SEAL Team—Picked up for a 22-episode full season on October 12, 2017.
- Superior Donuts—Picked up for a 21-episode full season on November 27, 2017.
- S.W.A.T.—Picked up for a 20-episode full season on November 17, 2017, two additional episodes were ordered on December 1, 2017, bringing the episode count up to 22.
- Young Sheldon—Picked up for a 22-episode full season on September 27, 2017.

==== The CW ====
- Dynasty—Picked up for a 22-episode full season on November 8, 2017.

==== Fox ====
- Ghosted—Picked up for six additional episodes on November 29, 2017, bringing the episode count up to 16.
- LA to Vegas—Picked up for three additional episodes on January 9, 2018, bringing the episode count to 15.
- The Mick—Picked up for a 20-episode full season on November 7, 2017.
- Star—Picked up for an 18-episode full season on October 9, 2017.

=== Renewals ===
==== ABC ====
- The $100,000 Pyramid—Renewed for a fourth season on August 7, 2018.
- Agents of S.H.I.E.L.D.—Renewed for a sixth season on May 14, 2018.
- America's Funniest Home Videos—Renewed for a twenty-ninth season on March 13, 2018.
- American Housewife—Renewed for a third season on May 11, 2018.
- American Idol—Renewed for a seventeenth season on May 4, 2018.
- The Bachelor—Renewed for a twenty-third season on March 13, 2018.
- Black-ish—Renewed for a fifth season May 11, 2018.
- Celebrity Family Feud—Renewed for a sixth season on August 7, 2018.
- Child Support—Renewed for a second season on March 13, 2018.
- Dancing with the Stars—Renewed for a twenty-seventh season on March 13, 2018.
- For the People—Renewed for a second season on May 11, 2018.
- Fresh Off the Boat—Renewed for a fifth season on May 11, 2018.
- The Goldbergs—Renewed for a sixth season on May 11, 2017.
- The Good Doctor—Renewed for a second season on March 7, 2018.
- The Great American Baking Show—On May 4, 2018, the show was renewed for a fourth season to premiere later that year.
- The Great Christmas Light Fight—During the season five finale it was announced that the show was renewed for a sixth season, set to air in 2018.
- Grey's Anatomy —Renewed for a fifteenth season on April 20, 2018.
- How to Get Away with Murder—Renewed for a fifth season on May 11, 2018.
- Modern Family—Renewed for a tenth season on May 10, 2017.
- Shark Tank—Renewed for a tenth season on January 8, 2018.
- Speechless—Renewed for a third season on May 11, 2018.
- Splitting Up Together—Renewed for a second season on May 11, 2018.
- Station 19—Renewed for a second season on May 11, 2018.
- To Tell the Truth—Renewed for a fourth season on August 7, 2018.

==== CBS ====
- 48 Hours—Renewed for a thirty-first season on April 18, 2018.
- 60 Minutes—Renewed for a fifty-first season on April 18, 2018.
- The Amazing Race—Renewed for a thirty-first season on April 18, 2018.
- The Big Bang Theory—Renewed for a twelfth and final season on March 20, 2017.
- Blue Bloods—Renewed for a ninth season on April 18, 2018.
- Bull—Renewed for a third season on April 18, 2018.
- Celebrity Big Brother—Renewed for a second season on May 12, 2018.
- Criminal Minds—Renewed for a fourteenth season on May 12, 2018.
- Elementary—Renewed for a seventh and final season on May 12, 2018.
- Hawaii Five-0—Renewed for a ninth season on April 18, 2018.
- Instinct—Renewed for a second season on May 12, 2018.
- Life in Pieces—Renewed for a fourth season on May 12, 2018.
- MacGyver—Renewed for a third season on April 18, 2018.
- Madam Secretary—Renewed for a fifth season on April 18, 2018.
- Man with a Plan—Renewed for a third season on May 12, 2018.
- Mom—Renewed for a sixth season on April 8, 2018.
- NCIS—Renewed for a sixteenth season on April 13, 2018.
- NCIS: Los Angeles—Renewed for a tenth season on April 18, 2018.
- NCIS: New Orleans—Renewed for a fifth season on April 18, 2018.
- Ransom—Renewed for a third season on July 16, 2018.
- SEAL Team—Renewed for a second season on March 27, 2018.
- Survivor—Renewed for a thirty-seventh season on April 18, 2018.
- S.W.A.T.—Renewed for a second season on March 27, 2018.
- Young Sheldon—Renewed for a second season on January 6, 2018.

==== The CW ====
- The 100—Renewed for a sixth season on May 7, 2018.
- Arrow—Renewed for a seventh season on April 2, 2018.
- Black Lightning—Renewed for a second season on April 2, 2018.
- Burden of Truth—Renewed for a second season on October 9, 2018.
- Crazy Ex-Girlfriend—Renewed for a fourth and final season on April 2, 2018.
- Dynasty—Renewed for a second season on April 2, 2018.
- The Flash—Renewed for a fifth season on April 2, 2018.
- iZombie—Renewed for a fifth and final season on May 11, 2018.
- Jane the Virgin—Renewed for a fifth and final season on April 2, 2018.
- Legends of Tomorrow—Renewed for a fourth season on April 2, 2018.
- Masters of Illusion—Renewed for an eighth season on October 9, 2018.
- The Outpost—Renewed for a second season on October 9, 2018.
- Penn & Teller: Fool Us—Renewed for a sixth season on October 9, 2018.
- Riverdale—Renewed for a third season on April 2, 2018.
- Supergirl—Renewed for a fourth season on April 2, 2018.
- Supernatural—Renewed for a fourteenth season on April 2, 2018.
- Whose Line Is It Anyway?—Renewed for a fifteenth season on October 9, 2018.

==== Fox ====
- 9-1-1—Renewed for a second season on January 16, 2018.
- Beat Shazam—Renewed for a third season on August 21, 2018.
- Bob's Burgers—Renewed for a ninth season on May 12, 2018.
- Empire—Renewed for a fifth season on May 2, 2018.
- Family Guy—Renewed for a seventeenth season on May 12, 2018.
- The Gifted—Renewed for a second season on January 4, 2018.
- Gordon Ramsay's 24 Hours to Hell and Back—Renewed for a second season on June 27, 2018.
- Gotham—Renewed for a fifth and final season on May 13, 2018.
- Lethal Weapon—Renewed for a third season on May 13, 2018.
- MasterChef—Renewed for a tenth season on September 20, 2018.
- The Orville—Renewed for a second season on November 2, 2017.
- The Resident—Renewed for a second season on May 7, 2018.
- The Simpsons—Renewed for a thirtieth season on November 4, 2016.
- Star—Renewed for a third season on May 10, 2018.

==== NBC ====
- American Ninja Warrior—Renewed for an eleventh season on February 14, 2019.
- A.P. Bio—Renewed for a second season on May 8, 2018.
- The Blacklist—Renewed for a sixth season on May 12, 2018.
- Blindspot—Renewed for a fourth season on May 10, 2018.
- Chicago Fire—Renewed for a seventh season on May 9, 2018.
- Chicago Med—Renewed for a fourth season on May 9, 2018.
- Chicago P.D.—Renewed for a sixth season on May 9, 2018.
- Ellen's Game of Games—Renewed for a second season on January 9, 2018.
- Football Night in America—Renewed for a thirteenth season on December 14, 2011.
- Good Girls—Renewed for a second season on May 7, 2018.
- The Good Place—Renewed for a third season on November 21, 2017.
- Law & Order: Special Victims Unit—Renewed for a twentieth season on May 9, 2018.
- Making It—Renewed for a second season on August 21, 2018.
- Midnight, Texas—Renewed for a second season on February 14, 2018.
- NBC Sunday Night Football—Renewed for a thirteenth season on December 14, 2011.
- Superstore—Renewed for a fourth season on February 21, 2018.
- This Is Us—Renewed for a third season on January 18, 2017.
- The Voice—Renewed for a fifteenth season on May 10, 2018.
- The Wall—Renewed for a third season on March 12, 2018.
- Will & Grace—Renewed for a tenth season on August 3, 2017 and for an eleventh season on March 17, 2018.
- World of Dance—Renewed for a third season on May 10, 2018.

=== Cancellations/series endings ===
==== ABC ====
- Alex, Inc.—Canceled on May 11, 2018. The series concluded on May 16, 2018.
- The Crossing—Canceled on May 11, 2018. The series concluded on June 9, 2018.
- Deception—Canceled on May 11, 2018. The series concluded on May 27, 2018.
- Designated Survivor—Canceled on May 11, 2018, after two seasons. On September 5, 2018, it was announced that Netflix would pick up the series for another season.
- Inhumans—Canceled on May 11, 2018.
- Kevin (Probably) Saves the World—Canceled on May 11, 2018.
- The Mayor—Canceled on January 4, 2018.
- The Middle—It was announced on August 2, 2017 that season nine would be the final season. The series concluded on May 22, 2018.
- Once Upon a Time—It was announced on February 6, 2018 that season seven would be the final season. The series concluded on May 18, 2018.
- The Proposal—Canceled on August 5, 2019.
- Quantico—Canceled on May 11, 2018, after three seasons. The series concluded on August 3, 2018.
- Roseanne—Originally renewed for an eleventh season on March 30, 2018. The decision was later reversed and the series canceled on May 29, 2018, following controversial tweets made by Roseanne Barr on Twitter about Valerie Jarrett. On June 21, 2018, ABC announced that the series would be revived as spin-off tentatively titled The Conners with mostly the same cast and crew, minus Barr.
- Scandal—It was announced on May 10, 2017 that season seven would be the final season. The series concluded on April 19, 2018.
- Take Two—Canceled on November 21, 2018.
- Ten Days in the Valley—On October 26, 2017, ABC gave notice that the series would be moved from Sundays to a burn off run of its final six episodes on Saturdays after the end of the Saturday Night Football season through the holidays, rendering it a de facto cancellation.

==== CBS ====
- 9JKL—Canceled on May 12, 2018.
- Code Black—Canceled on May 24, 2018, after three seasons. The series concluded on July 18, 2018.
- Kevin Can Wait—Canceled on May 12, 2018, after two seasons.
- Living Biblically—Pulled from the schedule on April 19, 2018 after eight episodes.
- Me, Myself & I—Pulled from the schedule on November 1, 2017 after six episodes, making it the first official cancellation of the season.
- Salvation—Canceled on November 20, 2018, after two seasons.
- Scorpion—Canceled on May 12, 2018, after four seasons.
- Superior Donuts—Canceled on May 12, 2018, after two seasons.
- Wisdom of the Crowd—Not ordering additional episodes on November 27, 2017, ending its run after 13 episodes.

==== The CW ====
- Life Sentence—Canceled on May 8, 2018. The series concluded on June 15, 2018.
- The Originals—It was announced on July 20, 2017 that season five would be the final season. The series concluded on August 1, 2018.
- Valor—Canceled on May 8, 2018.

==== Fox ====
- Brooklyn Nine-Nine—Canceled on May 10, 2018, after five seasons. On May 11, 2018, it was announced that NBC would pick up the series for another season.
- The Exorcist—Canceled on May 11, 2018, after two seasons.
- Ghosted—Canceled on June 28, 2018. The series concluded on July 22, 2018.
- LA to Vegas—Canceled on May 21, 2018.
- The Last Man on Earth—Canceled on May 10, 2018, after four seasons.
- Love Connection—Canceled on February 27, 2019, after two seasons.
- Lucifer—Canceled on May 11, 2018, after three seasons. On June 15, 2018, it was announced that Netflix would pick up the series for another season.
- The Mick—Canceled on May 10, 2018, after two seasons.
- New Girl—It was announced on May 14, 2017 that season seven would be the final season. The series concluded on May 15, 2018.
- The X-Files—Network co-chairman and CEO Gary Newman stated that the network currently has no plans for a twelfth season. This comes after star Gillian Anderson announced that the eleventh season would be her last.

==== NBC ====
- Better Late Than Never—Canceled on July 16, 2018, after two seasons.
- The Brave—Canceled on May 11, 2018.
- Champions—Canceled on June 29, 2018.
- Great News—Canceled on May 11, 2018, after two seasons.
- Marlon—Canceled on December 21, 2018, after two seasons.
- Reverie—Canceled on November 6, 2018.
- Rise—Canceled on May 11, 2018. The series concluded on May 15, 2018.
- Running Wild with Bear Grylls—It was announced on February 10, 2019 that the show will move to National Geographic for season five.
- Shades of Blue—It was announced on April 4, 2018, that season three would be the final season. The series concluded on August 19, 2018.
- Taken—Pulled from the schedule after 11 episodes in the second season on April 18, 2018; NBC announced that the series would move from Fridays to a burn off run of three final episodes on Saturdays during the first three weeks of summer. The series was later canceled on May 11, 2018, after two seasons.
- Timeless—Canceled on June 22, 2018, after two seasons.
- Trial & Error—Canceled on January 16, 2019, after two seasons.

== Programming circumstances not previously noted ==
=== ABC ===
- The third season of The Great American Baking Show premiered on Thursday, December 7, 2017 with two episodes in one night under the expectation of carrying two more episodes on the nights of December 14 and 21, respectively to complete the six-episode season. The program was removed from the schedule on December 13, 2017 due to sexual harassment allegations against judge Johnny Iuzzini. The winner (Vallery Lomas) was announced in a short video on December 21, and ABC substituted various holiday programming in its place.

=== CBS and NBC to Fox ===
- The NFL announced on January 31, 2018 that the Thursday Night Football package would move in full to Fox for the 2018 season.

== See also ==
- 2017–18 Canadian network television schedule
- 2017–18 United States network television schedule (daytime)
- 2017–18 United States network television schedule (late night)
