= The Proposal (Australian TV series) =

Australian reality television series

- Genre: Reality Series
- Based on: The Proposal by Mike Fleiss
- Presented by: Luke Jacobz
- Country of origin: Australia
- Original language: English
- No. of seasons: 1
- No. of episodes: 8

Original release
- Network: Seven Network
- Release: 27 August – 22 October 2019

The Proposal is a reality dating series based on the American series of the same name that premiered on Seven Network on 27 August 2019. The show is hosted by Luke Jacobz. The series will feature same-sex participants.

A bachelor or bachelorette is hidden from view, and 10 contestants must introduce themselves and answer questions posed by the bachelor or bachelorette. Contestants are eliminated until the end of the hour, when the bachelor or bachelorette can choose to propose to one of the final two candidates.

Due to dismal ratings, the program was bumped to 9.30pm from Episode 4. The program was axed in January 2020.

== Ratings ==
No.	Title	Air date	Overnight ratings		Ref(s)
No.	Title	Air date	Viewers	Rank	Ref(s)
1	Episode 1	27 August 2019	307,000	—N/a	
2	Episode 2	3 September 2019	307,000	—N/a	
3	Episode 3	10 September 2019	252,000	—N/a	
4	Episode 4	17 September 2019	185,000	—N/a	
5	Episode 5	1 October 2019	125,000	—N/a	
6	Episode 6	8 October 2019	152,000	—N/a	
7	Episode 7	15 October 2019	120,000	—N/a	
8	Episode 8	22 October 2019	124,000	—N/a	

== Link ==
Official Website
