= Barwan Kala, Bihar =

Village in Bihar, India

Barwan Kala is a village located in the Tehsil Adhaura of Kaimur District of the state of Bihar in India. It is a rural village taking place in the list with other 128 villages. It is said that bachelors in this village has not seen a single marriage in the last 50 years, it means Barwan Kala in Bihar is witnessing singledom.

== State ==
It falls under the Assembly Constituency of "Chainpur" & Loksabha Constituency of "Sasaram".

== Population ==
As per the Census of 2011 by Government of India, total 244 families were residing. The population was 1387 of which 743 are males while 644 are females.

== Demographics ==
The PIN code of Barwan Kala is 821102 with post office Adhaura. Its dialing code is 06180.

== Marriageability of residents ==
The village has somewhere around 130 bachelors. It is estimated that it is the highest number of unmarried males in any village of Bihar. The reason behind this is the poor condition of village. They feel no outsider would give the hand of their daughters to the village youth which is disconnected from the rest of the world in terms of no telecommunication, irrigation, power & water.

== Transportation ==
At present, there is no railway station near to this village. One has to reach Bhabua via road to reach here.

== School ==
The village has a +2 high school located in Adhaura block. It is a co-ed school for class 1st till Class 12th.
