= Instant Hotel =

- Genre: Reality
- Presented by: Laurence Llewelyn-Bowen and Luke Jacobz (former)
- Judges: Juliet Ashworth
- Opening theme: “Back Home” by Andy Grammer
- Country of origin: Australia
- Original language: English
- No. of seasons: 2
- No. of episodes: 18

Production
- Running time: 60-90 minutes (including commercials)
- Production company: Seven Studios

Original release
- Network: Seven Network
- Release: 7 November 2017 – 18 March 2019

Instant Hotel is an Australian reality television series which began airing on the Seven Network on 7 November 2017. The series follows homeowners who have transformed their homes into hotels and are individually judged by each other to receive the highest scores with the winner to win an ultimate prize.

The series is produced by the creators of Seven reality shows My Kitchen Rules and House Rules and the first season was hosted by Luke Jacobz.

In November 2017, the series was renewed for a second season which aired in 2019. In December 2018, Seven announced Laurence Llewelyn-Bowen would replace Luke Jacobz as host in 2019. The second season aired on 11 February 2019. Netflix distributed the show internationally between 2018 and 2023.

== Format changes ==
The first season contained two groups of five with the highest from each group going head to head in the grand final. The second season contained only four pairs of contestants with the highest two teams going head to head in the grand final.

The prize for the first season was an all-expense-paid stay at a Californian Instant Hotel. The prize for the second season was $100,000.

== Series details ==
Season	Episodes	Originally aired		Result	
Season	Episodes	Season premiere	Season finale	Winning team	Prize
1	12	7 November 2017	29 November 2017	Terry & Anita	All expense paid stay in California
2	6	11 February 2019	18 March 2019	Debbie & Justin	$100,000

== Season 1 ==
=== Teams ===
State		Group	Members	Relationship	Hometown	Status
Queensland	QLD	2	Terry & Anita	Blended Family	Brisbane	Winners
New South Wales	NSW	1	Babe & Bondi	Mother & Daughter	Bondi Beach	Runners-up
Victoria	VIC	2	Bec & Tristan	Country Siblings	Mildura	Eliminated (Round 2)
Victoria	VIC	2	Serena & Sturt	Entrepreneur Besties	Point Cook	Eliminated (Round 2)
Queensland	QLD	2	Lynne & Simon	Just Friends	Gold Coast	Eliminated (Round 2)
New South Wales	NSW	2	Mikey & Shay	Socialites	West Pennant Hills	Eliminated (Round 2)
Queensland	QLD	1	Brent & Leroy	The Fussy Couple	Port Douglas	Eliminated (Round 1)
New South Wales	NSW	1	Samantha & James	Newlyweds	Byron Bay	Eliminated (Round 1)
South Australia	SA	1	Mark & Jannine	Highschool Sweethearts	Barossa Valley	Eliminated (Round 1)
Northern Territory	NT	1	Adam & Kathy	Young Family	Humpty Doo	Eliminated (Round 1)

=== Season One Details ===
==== Instant Hotel Rounds ====
Over two rounds, each team scored each other out of ten based on the house, location/nearby attractions, value for money, and quality of a good night's sleep. Series judge, Juliet Ashworth, also scored each team out of ten based on the quality of the house. In a twist, the hotel owners also scored the contestants overall on their stay as houseguests, which also went towards their final scores. The team that scored the highest at the end of each round went to the Grand Final.

==== Round 1 ====
- Episodes 1 to 5
- Air date — 7 to 14 November
- Description — The first of the two instant hotel groups are introduced into the competition in Round 1. The highest scoring team at the end of this round will go through to Grand Final.

Instant Hotel Summary
Group 1
Team and Episode Details		Guest Scores					Juliet's Score	Hotel owner's Score	Total (out of 50)	Final Total	Rank	Result
Team and Episode Details		A&K	M&J	S&J	B&B	B&L	Juliet's Score	Hotel owner's Score	Total (out of 50)	Final Total	Rank	Result
NT	Adam & Kathy	—	6	5	7	6	7	8	31	63	4th	Eliminated
Ep 1	7 November	Top End Hideaway										Eliminated
Hotel Info		Sleeps 8 people 5 Bedrooms; 4 Beds; 2.5 Bathrooms; Pool Retreat $1000 per night										Eliminated
SA	Mark & Jannine	7	—	6	8	7	8	8	36	68	2nd	Eliminated
Ep 2	8 November	Unique Retro Home										Eliminated
Hotel Info		Sleeps 8 people 2 Bedrooms; 4 Beds; 2 Bathrooms $800 per night										Eliminated
NSW	Samantha & James	8	7	—	6	5	8	8	34	66	3rd	Eliminated
Ep 3	9 November	Beach House Retreat										Eliminated
Hotel Info		Sleeps 8 people 4 Bedrooms; 4 Beds; 2 Bathrooms $1500 per night										Eliminated
NSW	Babe & Bondi	7	8	7	—	6	9	7	37	70	1st	Through to Grand Final
Ep 4	13 November	Chic Beachside Apartment										Through to Grand Final
Hotel Info		Sleeps 8 people 3 Bedrooms; 4 Beds; 2.5 Bathrooms $600 per night										Through to Grand Final
QLD	Brent & Leroy	7	6	4	6	—	8	9	31	62	5th	Eliminated
Ep 5	14 November	Tropical Getaway										Eliminated
Hotel Info		Sleeps 8 people 4 Bedrooms; 6 Beds; 2 Bathrooms; Pool Retreat $535 per night										Eliminated

==== Round 2 ====
- Episodes 6 to 10
- Air date — 15 to 27 November
- Description — The second of the two instant hotel groups are introduced into the competition in Round 2. The highest scoring team at the end of this round will go through to Grand Final.

Instant Hotel Summary
Group 2
Team and Episode Details		Guest Scores					Juliet's Score	Hotel owner's Score	Total (out of 50)	Final Total	Rank	Result
Team and Episode Details		T&A	B&T	S&S	L&S	M&S	Juliet's Score	Hotel owner's Score	Total (out of 50)	Final Total	Rank	Result
QLD	Terry & Anita	—	9	7	7	5	8	4	36	59	1st	Through to Grand Final
Ep 6	15 November	Sleek Queenslander										Through to Grand Final
Hotel Info		Sleeps 10 people 5 Bedrooms; 5 Beds; 5 Bathrooms $595 per night										Through to Grand Final
VIC	Bec & Tristan	7	—	4	5	6	7	7	29	49	= 3rd	Eliminated
Ep 7	20 November	A Class Act										Eliminated
Hotel Info		Sleeps 8 people 3 Bedrooms; 5 Beds; 2 Bathrooms $600 per night										Eliminated
VIC	Serena & Sturt	5	6	—	7	4	6	6	28	49	= 3rd	Eliminated
Ep 8	21 November	Modern Bayside Estate										Eliminated
Hotel Info		Sleeps 8 people 4 Bedrooms; 5 Beds; 2.5 Bathrooms $300 per night										Eliminated
QLD	Lynne & Simon	7	8	2	—	4	8	8	29	48	5th	Eliminated
Ep 9	22 November	Villa Verona										Eliminated
Hotel Info		Sleeps 11 people 4 Bedrooms; 7 Beds; 2 Bathrooms; Pool Retreat $475 per night										Eliminated
NSW	Mikey & Shay	6	6	4	6	—	5	2	27	52	2nd	Eliminated
Ep 10	27 November	Suburban Mansion										Eliminated
Hotel Info		Sleeps 8 people 4 Bedrooms; 4 Beds; 4 Bathrooms; Tennis Court/Pool Retreat $640/380 per night										Eliminated

=== Grand Final ===
- Episodes 11 & 12
- Air date — 28 to 29 November
- Description — Four eliminated contestants (two from each round) and the opposite grand finalist each stay at the house of one of the grand finalist. Each grand finalist made changes to their homes based on the comments from contestants in their round. The teams voted as a group on each criterion, being the value for money (VFM), location (L), night's sleep (NS), and the house (H). Juliet however did not score of night's sleep, instead scoring on how well they changed their home (CTH). The team that scored the highest were announced as the winners and received an all-expense-paid stay at an instant hotel in California.

Instant Hotel Summary
Grand Final
Team and Episode Details		Group Scores				Juliet's Scores				Total (out of 80)	Result
Team and Episode Details		VFM	L	NS	H	VFM	L	CTH	H	Total (out of 80)	Result
NSW	Babe & Bondi	8	7	5	5	8	9	8	8	58	Runners-up
Ep 11	28 November	Chic Beachside Apartment									Runners-up
Hotel Info		Sleeps 8 people 3 Bedrooms; 4 Beds; 2.5 Bathrooms $600 per night									Runners-up
QLD	Terry & Anita	8	6	8	9	7	7	9	10	64	Winners
Ep 12	29 November	Sleek Queenslander									Winners
Hotel Info		Sleeps 10 people 5 Bedrooms; 5 Beds; 5 Bathrooms $595 per night									Winners

=== Ratings ===
No.	Title	Air date	Timeslot	Overnight ratings		Consolidated ratings		Total viewers	Ref(s)
No.	Title	Air date	Timeslot	Viewers	Rank	Viewers	Rank	Total viewers	Ref(s)
1	Adam & Kathy	7 November 2017	Tuesday 7:30pm	695,000	12	24,000	12	719,000	
2	Mark & Jannine	8 November 2017	Wednesday 7:30pm	583,000	12	34,000	12	607,000	
3	Samantha & James	9 November 2017	Thursday 7:30pm	687,000	7	34,000	8	721,000	
4	Babe & Bondi	13 November 2017	Monday 7:30pm	653,000	12	31,000	11	684,000	
5	Brent & Leroy	14 November 2017	Tuesday 7:30pm	718,000	7	41,000	7	759,000	
6	Terry & Anita	15 November 2017	Wednesday 7:30pm	525,000	13	45,000	14	570,000	
7	Bec & Tristan	20 November 2017	Monday 7:30pm	587,000	13	43,000	13	630,000	
8	Serena & Sturt	21 November 2017	Tuesday 7:30pm	633,000	9	35,000	9	668,000	
9	Lynne & Simon	22 November 2017	Wednesday 7:30pm	611,000	9	35,000	11	646,000	
10	Mikey & Shay	27 November 2017	Monday 7:30pm	578,000	13	37,000	12	615,000	
11	Grand Final: Part 1	28 November 2017	Tuesday 7:30pm	608,000	9	46,000	9	654,000	
12	Grand Final: Part 2	29 November 2017	Wednesday 7:30pm	611,000	10	37,000	10	648,000	

== Season 2 ==
=== Teams ===
State		Members	Relationship	Hometown	Status
Queensland	QLD	Debbie & Justin	Mother & Son	Buddina, Sunshine Coast	Winners
South Australia	SA	Razz & Mark	Engaged	Coober Pedy	3rd Place
Victoria	VIC	Jay & Leah	Newly dating	Portsea	4th Place
Queensland	QLD	Gene & Sharon	Married	Cairns	Runners-Up

=== Season 2 Details ===
Season two followed a similar format as last time with each team scoring each other out of ten based on the house, location/nearby attractions, value for money, and quality of a good night's sleep. It saw the return of season one judge Juliet Ashworth, as well as a new additional judge, Laurence Llewelyn-Bowen. Each judge also scored the team's house out of ten. The two teams that scored the highest faced off in the finals.

==== Round 1 ====
- Episodes 1 to 5
- Air date — 7 to 14 November
- Description — The first of the two instant hotel groups are introduced into the competition in Round 1. The highest scoring team at the end of this round will go through to Grand Final.
