= 2017–18 United States network television schedule (late night) =

These are the late night schedules for the four United States broadcast networks that offer programming during this time period, starting September 2017. All times are Eastern or Pacific. Affiliates will fill non-network schedule with local, syndicated, or paid programming. Affiliates also have the option to preempt or delay network programming at their discretion.

== Legend ==
- Light blue indicates Local programming.
- Gray indicates encore programming.
- Yellow indicates late night talk or variety shows.
- Gold indicates network news programming.

== Schedule ==
=== Monday-Friday Overnights ===
Network	11:00 pm	11:30 pm	12:00 am	12:30 am	1:00 am	1:30 am	2:00 am	2:30 am	3:00 am	3:30 am	4:00 am	4:30 am	5:00 am	5:30 am
ABC	Local Programming	Jimmy Kimmel Live! (11:35)		Nightline (12:35)	Local Programming		ABC World News Now				America This Morning	Local Programming		
CBS	Local Programming	The Late Show with Stephen Colbert (11:35)		The Late Late Show with James Corden (12:35)		Local Programming	CBS Overnight News				CBS Morning News	Local Programming		
NBC	Local Programming	The Tonight Show Starring Jimmy Fallon (11:34)		Late Night with Seth Meyers		Last Call with Carson Daly	Today With Kathie Lee and Hoda (R)		Early Today			Local Programming		

=== Saturday overnights ===
Network		11:00 p.m.	11:30 p.m.	12:00 a.m.	12:30 a.m.	1:00 a.m.	1:30 a.m.	2:00 a.m.	2:30 a.m.	3:00 a.m.	3:30 a.m.	4:00 a.m.	4:30 a.m.	5:00 a.m.	5:30 a.m.
NBC		Local programming	Saturday Night Live (11:29)			Local programming (1:02)									
Fox	Fall	Hell's Kitchen (R)		Local programming											
Fox	Winter	Love Connection (R)		Local programming											
Fox	Spring	Showtime at the Apollo (R)		Local programming											
Fox	Late Spring	Gordon Ramsay's 24 Hours to Hell and Back (R)		Local programming											
Fox	Summer	Love Connection (R)		Local programming											

== By network ==
=== ABC ===
Returning series

- ABC World News Now
- Jimmy Kimmel Live!
- Nightline

=== CBS ===
Returning series

- CBS Overnight News
- The Late Show with Stephen Colbert
- The Late Late Show with James Corden

=== FOX ===
Returning series

- Encore Programming

=== NBC ===
Returning series

- Last Call with Carson Daly
- Late Night with Seth Meyers
- Saturday Night Live
- Today With Kathie Lee and Hoda (reruns)
- The Tonight Show Starring Jimmy Fallon

Not returning from 2016-17:

- Mad Money (reruns)
