= Million Dollar Mile =

- Genre: Game show
- Created by: LeBron James; Maverick Carter; Allison Grodner; Rich Meehan
- Directed by: Alex Van Wagner
- Presented by: Tim Tebow
- Starring: Commentators: Matt "Money" Smith; Maria Taylor; Defenders: Emma Chapman ("The Mighty Kiwi"); Max Fennell ("The Machine"); Rebecca Hammond ("The Harvard Hammer"); Veejay Jones ("The Prodigy"); Robert Killian ("The Captain"); Hunter McIntyre ("The Sheriff"); Erik Mukhametshin ("The Beast From the East"); Faye Stenning ("The Canadian Crusher"); Isaiah Vidal ("The Destroyer"); Orla Walsh ("The Vermaniac")
- Country of origin: United States
- Original language: English
- No. of seasons: 1
- No. of episodes: 9

Production
- Executive producers: LeBron James; Maverick Carter; Allison Grodner; Rich Meehan; Lee Metzger; Jamal Henderson; Philip Byron
- Production location: Los Angeles Center Studios
- Production companies: Fly on the Wall Entertainment; SpringHill Entertainment; Warner Horizon Unscripted Television

Original release
- Network: CBS
- Release: March 27 – August 3, 2019

Million Dollar Mile is an American obstacle course competition television series that premiered on March 27, 2019, on CBS. Former NFL quarterback Tim Tebow served as the main host, with Matt "Money" Smith and Maria Taylor as co-hosts, and NBA player LeBron James as an executive producer. The object of the game was to run through a 1-mile (1.6 km) obstacle course through Los Angeles's Westlake District and Downtown near the Los Angeles Center Studios, while avoiding various obstacles along the course, including a group of elite athletes whose goal was to stop them from winning the prize money à la American Gladiators, which could total up to $1 million if the entire course was completed successfully.

After just two episodes with low ratings, CBS moved the show from its Wednesday slot to Saturday nights, beginning May 4, 2019. That two-week run did no better compared to the ratings of CBS's usual Crimetime Saturday rerun block, and it was again pulled, with six episodes still unaired. CBS later scheduled the end of the burn-off of the series starting July 6, 2019, with the remaining episodes airing weekly. Repeats have aired on CBS Sports Network.

== Tier levels ==
After a contestant completes an obstacle ahead of the pro, they earn a level of prize money. However, they are not guaranteed that money until they successfully exit the course. At any time, the player can choose to go straight to the "exit obstacle" and attempt to finish that before the pro to take home the money earned thus far. Contestants who complete three obstacles are automatically guaranteed $50,000 regardless of whether they finish or not.

Obstacles Completed	Money
1	$10,000
2	$25,000
3	$50,000
4	$100,000
5	$250,000
6	$1,000,000

== Ratings ==
Viewership and ratings per episode of Million Dollar Mile
No.	Title	Air date	Rating/share (18–49)	Viewers (millions)	DVR (18–49)	DVR viewers (millions)	Total (18–49)	Total viewers (millions)
1	"Victory is Only a Mile Away"	March 27, 2019	0.9/4	3.90	TBD	TBD	TBD	TBD
2	"No One Can Beat Me"	April 3, 2019	0.8/4	3.26	0.1	0.49	0.9	3.74
3	"I'm Coming for You/I'm Coming for You"	May 4, 2019	0.2/2	1.65	TBD	TBD	TBD	TBD
4	"This Million is Mine"	May 11, 2019	0.3/2	1.54	0.0	0.11	0.3	1.65
5	"The Elite of the Elite"	July 6, 2019	0.2/2	1.32	0.0	0.19	0.2	1.51
6	"Let the Race Speak for Itself"	July 13, 2019	0.2/1	0.87	0.0	0.17	0.2	1.04
7	"I Think He Looks Like a Snack"	July 20, 2019	0.2/2	1.20	TBD	TBD	TBD	TBD
8	"I'm Going All the Way Tonight"	July 27, 2019	0.2/2	1.30	TBD	TBD	TBD	TBD
9	"I Was Born Ready for This"	August 3, 2019	0.2/1	1.21	TBD	TBD	TBD	TBD

== German version ==
An equally short-lived German version aired on ProSieben as Renn zur Million ... wenn Du kannst! (Run for a million ... if you can!) hosted by Daniel Aminati & Rebecca-Zarah Mir (or Rebecca Mir) in 2019 for only four episodes in total.
