= 1969 (TV series) =

2019 television documentary series

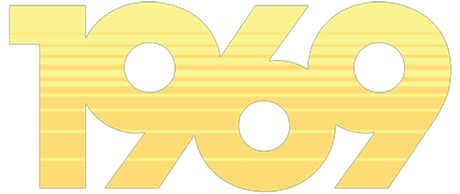
- Genre: Documentary
- Country of origin: United States
- Original language: English
- No. of series: 1
- No. of episodes: 6

Production
- Executive producer: Jeanmarie Condon

Original release
- Network: ABC
- Release: April 23 – May 28, 2019

1969 is an American six-part television documentary series on the events of the year 1969 which aired on ABC in 2019.

The series tells behind the scenes stories of major events on the year 1969, such as the Apollo 11 Moon landing and the Woodstock music festival. It includes interviews with some of those who were part of the events.

== Episodes ==
No.	Title	Directed by	Written by	Original release date	U.S. viewers (millions)
1	"Moon Shot"	Jeanmarie Condon	Jeanmarie Condon	April 23, 2019	2.95
2	"Manson Girls"	Sean Gullette	Jeanmarie Condon	April 30, 2019	2.38
3	"The Girl in the Car"	Jeanmarie Condon	Jeanmarie Condon	May 7, 2019	2.64
4	"The FBI and the Panther"	Cyndee Readdean	Jeanmarie Condon	May 14, 2019	1.80
5	"Generation Woodstock"	Sean Gullette	Jeanmarie Condon	May 21, 2019	1.93
6	"Fortunate Sons"	Jeanmarie Condon	Jeanmarie Condon	May 28, 2019	2.32

== Reception ==
Verne Gay of Newsday called the first episode about Apollo 11 "an essential and long overdue reminder" of how the event was the work of many. He said the episode made an "honorable effort" to include the women who contributed to the Moon landing, made necessary by the 2016 book and film Hidden Figures, and largely ignored by other stories told about the event. Of a later episode about the Chappaquiddick incident, Gay said, "Alas ... [this] episode makes a hard landing back to Earth."

A review in Vox framed the Manson Girls episode in #metoo terms. "There's a Manson girl counternarrative now"[...]"The women of the Manson family who didn't go to prison have spoken out about their treatment at Manson's hands, and they are beginning to find an audience [...] as these women continue to insist on their identities as not just 'the Manson girls' but as agents and human beings in their own right, popular culture is starting to take notice."

== See also ==
- Apollo 11 in popular culture
