= Genius Junior =

- Genre: Game show
- Presented by: Neil Patrick Harris
- Country of origin: United States
- Original language: English
- No. of seasons: 1
- No. of episodes: 10

Production
- Executive producers: Neil Patrick Harris; Pam Healey; John Hesling; Phil Parsons; Ed Egan
- Production locations: Warner Bros. Studios, Burbank, California
- Running time: 43 minutes
- Production companies: Shed Media; Prediction Productions

Original release
- Network: NBC
- Release: March 18 – May 13, 2018

Genius Junior is an American television game show that debuted on March 18, 2018, on NBC, during the 2017–18 season. In March 2017, NBC ordered ten episodes for the first season of the series, which was hosted by Neil Patrick Harris. The series shows children, aged 12 and under, competing in teams of three in five increasingly difficult rounds. Each round tested the teams in various subjects including spelling, mathematics, and memory. The winning team received the "Genius Junior Grant".

== Gameplay ==
Genius Junior is a tournament game show in which only the winners will advance and win the cash.

=== Main Game ===
Each show sees two teams of three kids compete in a series of brain-teasing, thought-provoking challenges. In each round, each team will play their half of the round against the clock. Harris will read a series of questions based on the round's criteria and the team in control will take turns answering them. Each correct answer scores one point. Each player can pass their turn if they don't know the answer, but each player can only do it once each round.

Before the second and third rounds, each team will have the option to nominate a player to be the "Super Brain". The nomination is made by the player hitting a buzzer in front of them. When this is done, that player will play the round alone, trying to answer as many questions and racking up as many points as they can. The "Super brain" option is only available to each team once.

At the end of the game, the team with the most points wins and will go on to face "The Cortex" for up to $100,000.

==== Games ====
===== Human GPS =====
The contestants are asked questions about locations. In the quarterfinals, the questions are about streets or stations in U.S. cities. In the semifinals, the questions are about vehicles or the human body. In the quarterfinals and semi-finals, the contestants have 90 seconds to answer, in the finals, they have 60 seconds. In the finals, the questions are about stars and constellations. In the finals, the Team in 3rd Place is eliminated.

===== Number Cruncher =====
The contestants are given math problems which get longer with each subsequent question and will not be able to see the numbers. The answer to the last question is the first number to the next question. In the quarterfinals, the contestants are given problems with possible addition, subtraction, multiplication, and division combinations. In the semifinals, the contestants are given all the numbers and are then told whether to add, subtract, multiply, or divide. In the finals, the problems will include squares, cubes, square roots, and/or cube roots.

===== Talking Dictionary =====
The contestants must spell words backward. In the quarterfinals, the contestants must simply spell each word backward. In the semifinals, the contestants are given the words without the vowels and must decipher them before spelling them backward. In the finals, the contestants may be told to simply spell each word backward, spell the word backward using only consonants, or spell the word backward using only vowels.

===== Memory Master =====
The contestants must remember the order of a standard deck of playing cards. In the quarterfinals, the contestants must remember one deck of cards starting with the first card. In the semifinals, the contestants must remember two decks of cards starting with the last card. In the event of a tie, the contestants must nominate one person on their team to answer a tie breaker question based on the cards they memorized, whoever answers correctly first, wins. Whoever buzzes In first will have 5 seconds to answer. The game isn’t played in the finals.

=== The Cortex ===
The winning team stands at a hexagonal area to play the final round. They'll have three minutes to complete the round and win the money. This round has three levels of gameplay. Each player will have their own level and stand on a path with a brain button at the end. Like before, Harris will read a series of questions and this time, each correct answer wins money and goes one step. As soon as the player in control reaches the end, they will have completed the level and make that indication by hitting the brain button and pass the action to the next player. Here's how the progress works:

Levels	Answers /Steps	Value
Level 1	3	$3,000
Level 2	4	$4,000
Level 3	5	$5,000

If the winning team can answer 12 questions correctly within those three minutes (3:00), their winnings will be doubled for a grand total of $100,000.

In the finals, the top 2 teams have two minutes plus one second for each point earned in the first three rounds and all the dollar values are doubled for a possible grand total of $200,000. The team that answers twelve questions correctly in the shortest length of time or that answers the most questions correctly wins.

== Tournament format ==
For the first six weeks, the twelve teams (two teams each game) fought for a spot in the semi-finals. The six winning teams advanced to the semi-finals for a spot in the finals for the "Genius Junior Grant". The losing semifinalists as well as the third-place finalists won a trip to Universal Orlando Resort while the runner-up finalists won a trip to Washington, D.C.

== International versions ==
Country	Name	Presenter	Channel	Broadcast
Germany	Einstein Junior - Deutschlands cleverste Kids	Max Giermann	RTL	21 July 2018
Canada; Quebec	100 génies	Pierre-Yves Lord	Ici Radio-Canada Télé	12 September 2019
Brazil	Pequenos Gênios (part of Caldeirão do Huck)	Luciano Huck	Rede Globo	

== Episodes ==
No.	Title	Original release date	Prod. code	U.S. viewers (millions)
1	"These Kids Know Something You Don't Know"	March 18, 2018	101	5.03
2	"Who's the Smartest?"	March 25, 2018	102	4.24
3	"Pint-Sized Genius"	April 8, 2018	103	4.45
4	"Big Brains, Big Surprises"	April 15, 2018	104	3.77
5	"Craniums and Brainiums"	April 22, 2018	105	3.64
6	"Little Big Thinkers"	April 29, 2018	106	3.72
7	"The Power Pose"	May 6, 2018	107	2.79
8	"Super Duper Brains"	May 6, 2018	108	2.76
9	"Bigger Problems, Bigger Brains"	May 13, 2018	109	2.55
10	"Hope For The Future"	May 13, 2018	110	2.99
