= The Proposal (American TV series) =

American reality television show

- Genre: Reality series
- Created by: Mike Fleiss
- Presented by: Jesse Palmer
- Country of origin: United States
- Original language: English
- No. of seasons: 1
- No. of episodes: 10

Production
- Executive producers: James Breen; Mike Fleiss; Martin Hilton; Jason Ehrlich
- Production companies: Next Entertainment; Warner Horizon Television

Original release
- Network: ABC
- Release: June 18 – August 27, 2018

Related
- The Bachelor

The Proposal is a reality dating series that airs on ABC and premiered on June 18, 2018. The show is hosted by Jesse Palmer, a former NFL quarterback and the season 5 Bachelor.

A bachelor or bachelorette is hidden from view, and 10 contestants of the opposite binary gender must introduce themselves and answer questions posed by the bachelor or bachelorette. Contestants are eliminated until the end of the hour, when the bachelor or bachelorette can choose to propose to one of the final two candidates.

On August 5, 2019, the series was cancelled after one season.

An Australian adaptation of the program aired on the Seven Network from August to October 2019.

== Episodes ==
No.	Title	Original release date	U.S. viewers (millions)	Rating/share (18–49)
1	"Episode 108"	June 18, 2018	3.79	0.8/3
2	"Ashlee"	June 25, 2018	3.56	0.8/3
3	"Stephen"	July 2, 2018	3.35	0.7/3
4	"Raye"	July 9, 2018	3.45	0.7/3
5	"Dr. Buck"	July 16, 2018	3.30	0.7/3
6	"Latoya"	July 23, 2018	2.94	0.6/3
7	"Winston"	July 30, 2018	3.01	0.6/3
8	"Dr. Celine"	August 13, 2018	2.45	0.5/2
9	"Episode 109"	August 20, 2018	2.28	0.5/2
10	"Episode 105"	August 27, 2018	2.32	0.5/2

== Controversy ==
On June 22, 2018, a woman named Erica Denae Meshke accused contestant Michael J. Friday of luring her for sexual assault in November 2017. As a result, ABC decided to pull the episode that features Friday from airing. On the show, he was eliminated after round 1.

== Reception ==
The series holds a score of 25 on Metacritic based on 4 reviews. Newsday gave the show 2 out of 4 stars. Tierney Bricker of E! Online says the show is like "The Bachelor on steroids."

== International editions ==
=== Australia ===
The Proposal
- Genre: Reality series
- Presented by: Luke Jacobz
- Country of origin: Australia
- Original language: English
- No. of seasons: 1
- No. of episodes: 8

Original release
- Network: Seven Network
- Release: August 27 – October 15, 2019

Related
- The Bachelor

An Australian version of the program was commissioned by the Seven Network, hosted by Luke Jacobz. 8 episodes were produced. It premiered on August 27, 2019 at 8:30pm to low ratings of just 329,000 viewers. After three episodes and continuing low ratings, it was bumped to 9:30pm. The final episode aired on October 15 to just 120,000 overnight viewers.

Seven has not stated whether the show will return for a second season, with any mention of the program absent during their Upfronts 2020 program line-up announcement.
