= What Just Happened??! with Fred Savage =

American television parody series

- Also known as: What Just Happened??!
- Genre: Comedy; Parody
- Created by: Dave Jeser; Matt Silverstein; Fred Savage
- Presented by: Fred Savage; Taylor Tomlinson
- Composer: Best Coast
- Country of origin: United States
- Original language: English
- No. of seasons: 1
- No. of episodes: 9

Production
- Production companies: The Crest Lamp Company; Double Hemm; Fox Entertainment; 20th Century Fox Television

Original release
- Network: Fox
- Release: June 30 – September 1, 2019

What Just Happened??! with Fred Savage (or What Just Happened??!) is an American parody television series hosted by Fred Savage. It is presented as the aftershow of a fictional drama series, The Flare. The series is co-hosted by Taylor Tomlinson. It premiered on June 30, 2019, on Fox.

A press release in August 2019 by Fox's Entertainment President, Michael Thorn, stated that according to low ratings, a second season of the series was highly unlikely, rendering it as a de facto cancellation.

== Episodes ==
No.	Title	Guests	Original release date	Prod. code	U.S. viewers (millions)
1	"Flarenomenon"	Rob Lowe & Kevin Zegers	June 30, 2019	1BGH01	0.70
Fred interviews Kevin Zegers, star of The Flare, who has never read the books the series was based on. Fred also visits a home he thinks belongs to Helen Mirren. Rob Lowe has a new book.
2	"Spoiler"	Vince Gilligan & Kevin Smith	July 7, 2019	1BGH02	0.64
Fred tries to persuade Vince Gilligan to reveal spoilers about The Flare, and he interviews Kevin Smith about Jay and Silent Bob Reboot.
3	"Assistant"	Ken Jeong & Fred Willard	July 14, 2019	1BGH04	0.72
Fred is working too hard so he needs to hire an assistant. With help from Ken Jeong he uses a process similar to The Masked Singer. Also, The Flare star Tyler Ritter is dismayed to learn from Fred that he is being fired.
4	"Preempted"	Joel McHale	July 21, 2019	1BGH05	0.70
A car chase causes The Flare to be pre-empted leaving Fred without anything to do until a fan calls in. Joel McHale and the cast of BH90210 promote their new shows.
5	"Parents"	Tiffany Haddish	July 28, 2019	1BGH06	0.65
Taylor's parents visit, and everyone learns Taylor's Dad's TV career from years ago. The Flare star Shiri Appleby takes Fred on a tour of the set but everything appears blurry. Tiffany Haddish promotes her new show.
6	"Family"	Yvette Nicole Brown & Rob Corddry	August 4, 2019	1BGH03	0.68
Fred's family feels ignored and his wife starts her own show. Rob Corddry tries out a virtual reality routine. Fred has fun with motion capture, to the dismay of the actor who is supposed to be doing it. Yvette Nicole Brown promotes her new show.
7	"Neighbor"	Eric Stonestreet & Randall Park	August 25, 2019	1BGH07	0.42
Fred has difficulty with this episode because Randall Park's show next door is too noisy, and then expansion of Randall's studio creates even more noise. Fred asks for help from the President of Television.
8	"Elevator"	Ike Barinholtz, Jillian Bell & Taran Killam	August 25, 2019	1BGH08	0.50
Fred gets stuck in an elevator with a very pregnant crew member, leaving Taylor to host the show.
9	"Havenbrook"	Ron Funches & Paige	September 1, 2019	1BGH09	0.60
With The Flare cancelled, Fred must now talk about the new teen drama Havenbrook. He interviews its stars including Paige. Then he campaigns to get The Flare back.
