= I Ship It =

American television series

- Genre: Romantic comedy; Musical
- Created by: Yulin Kuang
- Starring: Helen Highfield; Riley Neldam; David Witts; Yasmine Al-Bustami
- Composer: Brian Grider
- Country of origin: United States
- Original language: English
- No. of seasons: 2
- No. of episodes: 16

Production
- Executive producers: Yulin Kuang; Melissa Schneider; Kathleen Grace
- Producers: Blake Behnam; Nic Hill; Matt Hoklotubbe; Eben Kostbar; Michael J. McGarry; Mo Perkins
- Cinematography: Zack Wallnau
- Camera setup: Single-camera
- Running time: 21–22 minutes
- Production company: New Form Entertainment

Original release
- Network: CW Seed; The CW (2 episodes)
- Release: June 22, 2016

I Ship It is an American musical romantic comedy television series that premiered on June 22, 2016, on CW Seed with the second season on April 10, 2019 and the broadcast premiere on August 19, 2019, on The CW. The series, created by Yulin Kuang, is based on the web series of the same name. It stars Helen Highfield as Ella, an aspiring writer who recklessly quits her job to become a writer's assistant on her favorite TV show. On August 29, 2019, The CW dropped the show after two episodes due to low ratings. The remaining four episodes, along with the aired episodes, are available to stream on CW Seed.

== Cast and characters ==
=== Main ===
- Helen Highfield as Ella, a young aspiring writer who decides to quit her regular job at a shipping company ("I Ship It") and pursue her dreams by becoming a writer's assistant on her favorite TV Show Superstition.
- Riley Neldam as Tim, Ella's long-time boyfriend who also works at I Ship It to save up for his tuition for a graduate program in architecture.
- David Witts as Luke, a season two producer on Superstition who hires Ella as the new writer's assistant because the showrunner keeps firing old assistants.
- Yasmine Al-Bustami as Sasha/Jasmine, Ella's friend who was recently cast in a minor role on Superstition in season 2 of I Ship It. She finds herself attracted to the female lead of the show.

=== Recurring ===
- Ethan Peck as Nick/Saxon, the season two male lead of Superstition.
- Marissa Cuevas as Kayla/Therese, the season two female lead of Superstition.
- Kristen Rozanski as Shira, Ella and Tim's boss at I Ship It.
- Jazz Raycole as Winnie, Ella's season two roommate and best friend, who enjoys obsessing over Superstition with Ella.
- Gita Reddy as Marina, the showrunner of Superstition.

=== Notable season two guest stars ===
- Dia Frampton as Amber the Fangirl.
- Joey Richter as Sean the Fanboy.

== Episodes ==
=== Season 1 (2016) ===
No. overall	No. in season	Title	Directed by	Written by	Original release date
1	1	"Pilot"	Yulin Kuang	Yulin Kuang	June 22, 2016
2	2	"Let's Start a Band"	Yulin Kuang	Julia Prescott	June 22, 2016
3	3	"Even Superman Has a Day Job"	Yulin Kuang	Yulin Kuang	June 22, 2016
4	4	"All of These Feelings"	Yulin Kuang	Rachel Kiley	June 22, 2016
5	5	"A Novel Idea"	Yulin Kuang	Julia Prescott	June 29, 2016
6	6	"Cool Beans"	Yulin Kuang	Julia Prescott	June 29, 2016
7	7	"A Musical Adventure"	Yulin Kuang	Rachel Kiley	June 29, 2016
8	8	"Battle of the Bands"	Yulin Kuang	Yulin Kuang	July 6, 2016
9	9	"Is That It?"	Yulin Kuang	Rachel Kiley	July 6, 2016
10	10	"Probably Should Have Seen This Coming"	Yulin Kuang	Yulin Kuang	July 6, 2016

=== Season 2 (2019) ===
- All songs are sung by Ella (Helen Highfield) unless otherwise noted.

No. overall	No. in season	Title	Directed by	Written by	Original release date	US viewers (millions)
11	1	"Somewhere Magical"	Mo Perkins	Yulin Kuang	April 10, 2019; August 19, 2019 (The CW)	0.40
Songs: "There's Nowhere I'd Rather Be" (sung by Ella & Tim); "What If?"; "It's All Magic To Me"
12	2	"Superfans"	Mo Perkins	Yulin Kuang & Ann Lewis Hamilton	April 10, 2019; August 26, 2019 (The CW)	0.36
Songs: "I'm Watching You" (sung by Amber, Emily, Spencer, & Sean); "Fangirl At Heart" (sung by Ella & Winnie)
13	3	"The Orb of Truth"	Yulin Kuang	Philip Labes	April 10, 2019; September 2, 2019 (The CW)	N/A
Songs: "Why Can't You See It That Way?" (sung by Ella & Luke); "This Would Be Fun" (Sung by Ella, Luke, Winnie, & Tim)
14	4	"Four Times Ella Picked Up The Phone (And One Time She Didn't)"	Mo Perkins	Merigan Mulhern	April 10, 2019; September 9, 2019 (The CW)	N/A
Songs: Right Where You're Supposed To Be (sung by Ella & Tim); The Story of You and Me (sung by Tim)
15	5	"Spinning Off"	Mo Perkins	Rachel Kiley	April 10, 2019; September 16, 2019 (The CW)	N/A
Songs: "Kinda Sorta Maybe" (Sung by Luke); Everyone Dies (Sung by Sasha)
16	6	"It's Like Magic"	Yulin Kuang	Yulin Kuang	April 10, 2019; September 23, 2019 (The CW)	N/A
Songs: Things I Might Say (Sung by Ella and Tim & Luke); Not Quite The Same (Sung by Ella)

== Reception ==
The show won in the "Drama" category at the 6th Streamy Awards in 2016.

=== Ratings ===
Viewership and ratings per episode of I Ship It
No.	Title	Air date	Rating/share (18–49)	Viewers (millions)
11	"Somewhere Magical"	August 19, 2019	0.1/0	0.40
12	"Superfans"	August 26, 2019	0.1/1	0.36
