= 2016–17 United States network television schedule (late night) =

These are the late night schedules for the four United States broadcast networks that offer programming during this time period, from September 2016 to August 2017. All times are Eastern or Pacific. Affiliates will fill non-network schedule with local, syndicated, or paid programming. Affiliates also have the option to preempt or delay network programming at their discretion.

== Legend ==
- Light blue indicates Local programming.
- Gray indicates encore programming.
- Yellow indicates late night talk or variety shows.
- Gold indicates network news programming.

== Schedule ==
=== Monday-Friday ===
Network		11:00 pm	11:30 pm	12:00 am	12:30 am	1:00 am	1:30 am	2:00 am	2:30 am	3:00 am	3:30 am	4:00 am	4:30 am	5:00 am	5:30 am
ABC		Local Programming	Jimmy Kimmel Live! (11:35)		Nightline (12:35)	Local Programming		ABC World News Now				America This Morning	Local Programming		
CBS		Local Programming	The Late Show with Stephen Colbert (11:35)		The Late Late Show with James Corden (12:35)		Local Programming	CBS Overnight News				CBS Morning News	Local Programming		
NBC	Fall	Local Programming	The Tonight Show Starring Jimmy Fallon (11:34)		Late Night with Seth Meyers		Last Call with Carson Daly	Today With Kathie Lee and Hoda (R)		Mad Money (R)		Early Today	Local Programming		
NBC	Summer	Local Programming	The Tonight Show Starring Jimmy Fallon (11:34)		Late Night with Seth Meyers		Last Call with Carson Daly	Today With Kathie Lee and Hoda (R)		Early Today			Local Programming		

=== Saturday ===
Network		11:00 pm	11:30 pm	12:00 am	12:30 am	1:00 am	1:30 am	2:00 am	2:30 am	3:00 am	3:30 am	4:00 am	4:30 am	5:00 am	5:30 am
NBC		Local programming	Saturday Night Live (11:29)			Local programming (1:02)									
Fox	Fall	Hell's Kitchen (R)		Local programming											
Fox	Winter	Kicking & Screaming (R)		Local programming											
Fox	Spring	MasterChef Junior (R)		Local programming											
Fox	Summer	American Grit (R)		Local programming											

== By network ==
=== ABC ===
Returning series

- ABC World News Now
- Jimmy Kimmel Live!
- Nightline

=== CBS ===
Returning series

- CBS Overnight News
- The Late Show with Stephen Colbert
- The Late Late Show with James Corden

=== FOX ===
Returning Series

- Encore Programming

Not returning from 2015-16:

- Home Free (reruns)
- Party Over Here
- Sunday Sitcom Series

=== NBC ===
Returning series

- Last Call with Carson Daly
- Late Night with Seth Meyers
- Mad Money (reruns)
- Saturday Night Live
- Today With Kathie Lee and Hoda (reruns)
- The Tonight Show Starring Jimmy Fallon
