= Child Support (game show) =

American game show

- Genre: Game show
- Presented by: Fred Savage
- Starring: Ricky Gervais
- Country of origin: United States
- Original language: English
- No. of seasons: 2
- No. of episodes: 16

Production
- Executive producers: Ricky Gervais; David Goldberg; Caroline Baumgard; Jeff Krask; Michael Canter
- Running time: 60 mins. (with commercials)
- Production company: Banijay Studios North America

Original release
- Network: ABC
- Release: January 5 – December 14, 2018

Child Support is an American game show series, hosted by Fred Savage and starring Ricky Gervais. It premiered on January 5, 2018, on ABC. In its 2016 early development stage, the show was originally called Five to Survive. On March 13, 2018, ABC renewed the series for a second season. Later that year, the show did not return for the third season and was cancelled.

== Gameplay ==
A question is asked to an onstage contestant by Savage, and to a group of five children in a backstage room by Gervais. A correct answer by the contestant increases his/her winnings by one level (see below), but if they give an incorrect answer, footage of the children's responses is played back to the studio. If any of the children answers correctly, the contestant remains in the game but wins no money for the question; in addition, the highest remaining prize level is removed from play. The potential top prize is $200,000, which the contestant can only achieve by answering 10 consecutive questions correctly.

The game ends as soon as any of the following occurs:

- A total of 10 questions have been played.

- If the last question is answered correctly, the contestant keeps his/her entire winnings.

- If the contestant misses the question and the children answer correctly, they keep the money for their last correct answer.

- The contestant chooses to stop after either the fourth or eighth question, keeping all money won to that point.
- Both the contestant and the children fail to answer the same question correctly.

- In the first season, they left with nothing.
- In the second season, the contestant receives $500 for each correct answer given by the children to that point.

The children's responses are frequently played back for comic effect even when the contestant gives a correct answer. No contestant ever won the top prize.

Correct answers	1	2	3	4	5	6	7	8	9	10
Money won	$1,000	$2,000	$5,000	$10,000	$25,000	$50,000	$75,000	$100,000	$150,000	$200,000
Maximum consolation (season 2)	$500	$1,000	$1,500	$2,000	$2,500	$3,000	$3,500	$4,000	$4,500	$5,000

== Episodes ==
=== Season 1 (2018) ===
No. overall	No. in season	Title	Original release date	US viewers (millions)
1	1	"Episode 101"	January 5, 2018	4.40
2	2	"Episode 102"	January 12, 2018	4.14
3	3	"Episode 103"	January 19, 2018	3.75
4	4	"Episode 104"	January 26, 2018	4.11
5	5	"Episode 105"	February 2, 2018	3.82
6	6	"Episode 106"	February 9, 2018	2.24

=== Season 2 (2018) ===
No. overall	No. in season	Title	Original release date	US viewers (millions)
7	1	"Episode 201"	October 5, 2018	2.07
8	2	"Episode 202"	October 12, 2018	2.03
9	3	"Episode 203"	October 19, 2018	1.90
10	4	"Episode 204"	October 26, 2018	2.36
11	5	"Episode 205"	November 2, 2018	2.25
12	6	"Episode 206"	November 9, 2018	2.17
13	7	"Episode 207"	November 16, 2018	2.38
14	8	"Episode 208"	November 23, 2018	2.38
15	9	"Episode 209"	November 30, 2018	3.16
16	10	"Episode 210"	December 14, 2018	1.94
