= Bachelorette =

Unmarried woman

Bachelorette is a term used in American English for a single, unmarried woman. The term is derived from the word bachelor, and is often used by journalists, editors of popular magazines, and some individuals. "Bachelorette" was famously the term used to refer to female contestants on the old The Dating Game TV show and, more recently, The Bachelorette.

In older English, the female counterpart term to "bachelor" was "spinster". However, this has acquired negative connotations and, when used now, tends to imply that the unmarried woman is too old to find a husband and have children. A bachelorette may have previously been in a relationship.

In Canada, the term bachelorette also refers to a small bachelor apartment (an apartment with only one large room serving as a bedroom and living room plus a separate bathroom—i.e. a studio apartment).

== Derivation ==
The more proper neologism would be bacheloress, since the -ess suffix is the standard English suffix denoting a female subject, while -ette is a French-origin diminutive suffix, mainly used to denote something is smaller in size. However, in American English the -ess suffix is only marginally morphologically productive, and the -ette suffix can indicate a feminine version of a noun without a change in size (though many such words in -ette were intended to be jocular when they were first coined). The -ess suffix is also slowly falling into disuse in the English language due to attempts to neutralize professional terms; it is therefore less commonly applied to new terms nowadays.

== Reasons for use ==
An archaic English term for a woman who has never married is a spinster, while a woman who is divorced is a divorcée, and a woman whose spouse has died is a widow. "Spinster" often implied that the woman was older than the age when most women traditionally marry and that she would probably never marry; a more derogatory term was "old maid".

Typically, a young person (male or female) who has never been married is said to be "single" or "never married".

The term "bachelorette" may indicate a woman who is unmarried by choice, the counterpart to the term "bachelor".
