= TKO: Total Knock Out =

- Genre: Sports competition Sports entertainment
- Created by: Steve Hughes; Sean Kelly
- Directed by: Ivan Dudynsky
- Presented by: Kevin Hart
- Composer: Burnett Music Group
- Country of origin: United States
- Original language: English
- No. of seasons: 1
- No. of episodes: 10

Production
- Executive producers: Mark Burnett; Kevin Hart; Holly M. Wofford; Jane Y. Mun; Sean Kelly; Steve Hughes; Barry Poznick
- Production locations: CBS Studio Center; Studio City, California
- Production companies: HartBeat Productions; MGM Television

Original release
- Network: CBS
- Release: July 11 – September 21, 2018

TKO: Total Knock Out is an American obstacle course competition series which aired on CBS. The series premiered July 11, 2018, and was hosted by comedian Kevin Hart. The show ran for 10 episodes. The series ended on September 21, 2018.

== Premise ==
Each episode features five contestants running an obstacle course. One contestant will run through a course featuring four zones, while the remaining contestants man "battle stations," firing projectiles to try to slow the racer down or knock them off the course:

- Zone 1 ("The Ball Blaster"): Contestants must navigate narrow ledges attached to plexiglass panels they can hold, while the battle station fires soft balls from a cannon.
- Zone 2 ("The Frisboom"): Contestants must cross a narrow beam and a flexible bridge while the battle station fires large frisbee-like disks.
- Zone 3 ("The Spike Launcher"): Contestants must traverse a series of moving pedestals while the battle station fires spiked cubes.
- Zone 4 ("The Slammer"): Contestants must cross two spinning cylinders while the battle station releases giant sledge hammers.

In Zones 3 and 4, the projectiles are pre-aimed, and can only be released once each, while the first two zones allow the contestants to aim and fire as long as they have sufficient projectiles.

Contestants who are knocked off, or fall off, an obstacle once must attempt the obstacle again. A second fall constitutes a TKO; contestants can proceed to the next obstacle, but receive a one-minute penalty. Contestants who are judged to be intentionally trying to fail an obstacle may be given a five-minute penalty. In Zone 4, the second cylinder has a "time capsule" attached; grabbing the cylinder subtracts 90 seconds from the contestant's time.

For each episode, the contestant with the fastest adjusted run time—including any TKO penalties and time capsule deductions earned—wins the prize of $50,000, with contestants finishing in second, third, and fourth place receiving much smaller prizes (see table below). The five episode winners with the fastest adjusted times compete in a "Battle Royale" for $100,000.

	Money won	
Final placement	Episodes 1–9	Episode 10
1st place	$50,000	$100,000
2nd place	$5,000	$10,000
3rd place	$2,500	$5,000
4th place	$1,000	$2,000
5th place	$0	$0

== Ratings ==
No.	Episode	Air date	Timeslot (ET)	Rating/Share (18–49)		Viewers (millions)	Nightly rank
1	"Unsung Heroes"	July 11, 2018	Wednesday 9:00 p.m.	0.9	5	3.99	2
2	"Get Some, Goldilocks!"	July 18, 2018	Wednesday 9:00 p.m.	0.8	4	3.40	4
3	"I Got a Dad Bod"	July 25, 2018	Wednesday 9:00 p.m.	0.6	3	2.71	4
4	"This Ain't No Taco Eating Contest"	August 3, 2018	Friday 8:00 p.m.	0.6	3	2.87	1
5	"5 Fierce Females"	August 10, 2018	Friday 8:00 p.m.	0.5	2	2.68	2
6	"This Ain't No Rodeo"	August 17, 2018	Friday 8:00 p.m.	0.5	2	2.36	1
7	"Bring It On, Porkchop!"	August 31, 2018	Friday 8:00 p.m.	0.5	2	2.26	1
8	"I Came out of the Womb a Fighter"	September 7, 2018	Friday 9:00 p.m.	0.4	2	1.63	3
9	"Let's Go Grandpa"	September 14, 2018	Friday 9:00 p.m.	0.3	2	2.00	2
10	"Battle Royale"	September 21, 2018	Friday 9:00 p.m.	0.4	2	2.17	2
