= Castaways (TV series) =

American reality TV series

- Genre: Reality
- Composer: Stephen Phillips
- Country of origin: United States
- Original language: English
- No. of seasons: 1
- No. of episodes: 10

Production
- Producer: Grant Kahler
- Production location: Indonesia Batanta
- Production company: Nomad Entertainment

Original release
- Network: ABC
- Release: August 7 – September 18, 2018

Castaways is an American reality television show produced by ABC. The series premiered on August 7, 2018, and chronicles the lives of 12 individuals as they try to survive on a number of islands in Indonesia.

== Overview ==
Unlike other reality shows, participants on Castaways may not be initially aware that there are other "Castaways" nearby. This had led some sources to compare the show to Lost. Moreover, the participants can leave only by waiting for a rescue team at the end of the show or by quitting.

Each castaway has one piece of luggage. They all arrive alone and with their or someone else's luggage washed up on shore with them. Everyone is required to have a journal in their luggage where they write about themselves, thus allowing those who find it to learn about them.

== Production ==
The show produced by Nomad Entertainment which is associated with the executive producer and showrunner Grant Kahler, who created a series of television documentaries and reality shows, including MadHouse and Alaska: The Last Frontier.

All ten episodes were recorded in the South Pacific, Indonesia Islands, and Batanta.

== Participants ==
There are 12 castaways:

Castaway	Age	Hometown	Status
Angel Alvarenga	20	Chatsworth, California	Quit (Day 4)
Tracee Wnetrzak	41	Quartz Hill, California	Quit (Day ?)
Reshanna Hearvy	24	New York, New York	Quit (Day 6)
Eric Brown	31	Glendale, California	Quit (Day 7 or 8)
Krichelle Kerbow	25	Haiku, Hawaii	Quit (Day 9)
Tim Burke	50	Plant City, Florida	Quit (Day 20)
Terry Allen	62	Agoura, California	Quit (Day 37)
Sawyer Brown	30	Willseyville, New York	Rescued (Day 41)
Robbie Gibbons	42	Birmingham, Alabama	Rescued (Day 41)
Matt Jaskol	32	Las Vegas, Nevada	Rescued (Day 41)
Richard Rogers	35	Sequim, Washington	Rescued (Day 41)
Kenzi Whittington	24	Nashville, Tennessee	Rescued (Day 41)

== Episodes ==
No.	Title	Original release date	U.S. viewers (millions)
1	"Abandoned"	August 7, 2018	3.13
2	"Man Down"	August 14, 2018	2.73
3	"Only the Lonely"	August 21, 2018	2.42
4	"Three's a Crowd"	August 28, 2018	2.25
5	"A Cry for Help"	September 4, 2018	2.10
6	"My True Rescue"	September 11, 2018	2.04
7	"Is It Worth It?"	September 12, 2018	1.49
8	"Hindsight"	September 17, 2018	2.59
9	"The Search"	September 17, 2018	2.11
10	"We Got This"	September 18, 2018	1.61
