= Bachelor =

Unmarried man

A bachelor is a man who is not and has never been married.

== Etymology ==
A bachelor is first attested as the 12th-century bacheler: a knight bachelor, a knight too young or poor to gather vassals under his own banner. The Old French bacheler presumably derives from Provençal bacalar and Italian baccalare, but the ultimate source of the word is uncertain. The proposed Medieval Latin *baccalaris ("vassal", "field hand") is only attested late enough that it may have derived from the vernacular languages, rather than from the southern French and northern Spanish Latin baccalaria. Alternatively, it has been derived from Latin baculum ("a stick"), in reference to the wooden sticks used by knights in training.

== History ==
From the 14th century, the term "bachelor" was also used for a junior member of a guild (otherwise known as "yeomen") or university and then for low-level ecclesiastics, as young monks and recently appointed canons. (Note: Severtius, De Episcopis Lugdunensibus, p. 377 cited in Du Cange.) As an inferior grade of scholarship, it came to refer to one holding a "bachelor's degree". This sense of baccalarius or baccalaureus is first attested at the University of Paris in the 13th century in the system of degrees established under the auspices of Pope Gregory IX as applied to scholars still in statu pupillari. There were two classes of baccalarii: the baccalarii cursores, theological candidates passed for admission to the divinity course, and the baccalarii dispositi, who had completed the course and were entitled to proceed to the higher degrees.

In the Victorian era, the term "eligible bachelor" was used in the context of upper class matchmaking, denoting a young man who was not only unmarried and eligible for marriage, but also considered "eligible" in financial and social terms for the prospective bride under discussion. Also in the Victorian era, the term "confirmed bachelor" denoted a man who desired to remain single.

By the later 19th century, the term "bachelor" had acquired the general sense of "unmarried man". The expression bachelor party is recorded 1882. In 1895, a feminine equivalent "bachelor-girl" was coined, replaced in US English by "bachelorette" by the mid-1930s. In England and Wales, the term "bachelor" remained the official term used for the purpose of marriage registration until 2005, when it was abolished in favor of "single."

Bachelors have been subject to penal laws in many countries, most notably in Ancient Sparta and Rome. At Sparta, men unmarried after a certain age were subject to various penalties (Ancient Greek: ἀτιμία, atimía): they were forbidden to watch women's gymnastics; during the winter, they were made to march naked through the agora singing a song about their dishonor; and they were not provided with the traditional respect due to the elderly. Some Athenian laws were similar. Over time, some punishments developed into no more than a teasing game. In some parts of Germany, for instance, men who were still unmarried by their 30th birthday were made to sweep the stairs of the town hall until kissed by a "virgin". In a 1912 Pittsburgh Press article, there was a suggestion that local bachelors should wear a special pin that identified them as such, or a black necktie to symbolize that "....they [bachelors] should be in perpetual mourning because they are so foolish as to stay unmarried and deprive themselves of the comforts of a wife and home."

The idea of a tax on bachelors has existed throughout the centuries. Bachelors in Rome fell under the Lex Julia of 18 BC and the Lex Papia Poppaea of AD 9: these lay heavy fines on unmarried or childless people while providing certain privileges to those with several children. A law known as the Marriage Duty Act 1695 was imposed on single males over 25 years old by the English Crown to help generate income for the Nine Years' War. In Britain, taxes occasionally fell heavier on bachelors than other persons: examples include 6 & 7 Will. 3, the 1785 Tax on Servants, and the 1798 Income Tax.

A study that was conducted by professor Charles Waehler at the University of Akron in Ohio on non-married heterosexual males deduced that once non-married men reach middle age, they will be less likely to marry and will remain unattached later into their lives. The study concluded that there is only a 1-in-6 chance that men older than 40 will leave the single life, and that after the age 45, the odds fall to 1-in-20.

In certain Gulf Arab countries, "bachelor" can refer to men who are single as well as expatriate men married to a spouse residing in their country of origin (due to the high added cost of sponsoring a spouse onsite).

== Bachelorette ==
The term bachelorette is sometimes used to refer to a woman who has never been married.

The traditional female equivalent to bachelor is spinster, which is considered pejorative and implies unattractiveness (i.e. old maid, cat lady). The term "bachelorette" has been used in its place, particularly in the context of bachelorette parties and reality TV series The Bachelorette.

== See also ==
- Bachelor pad
- Herbivore men
- Men Going Their Own Way
- Singleton (lifestyle)
