= Ambrosia Lake =

Uranium mining district in New Mexico

Coordinates: 35.419°N 107.821°W

External image
- Ambrosia Lake mill and tailings pile after remediation.

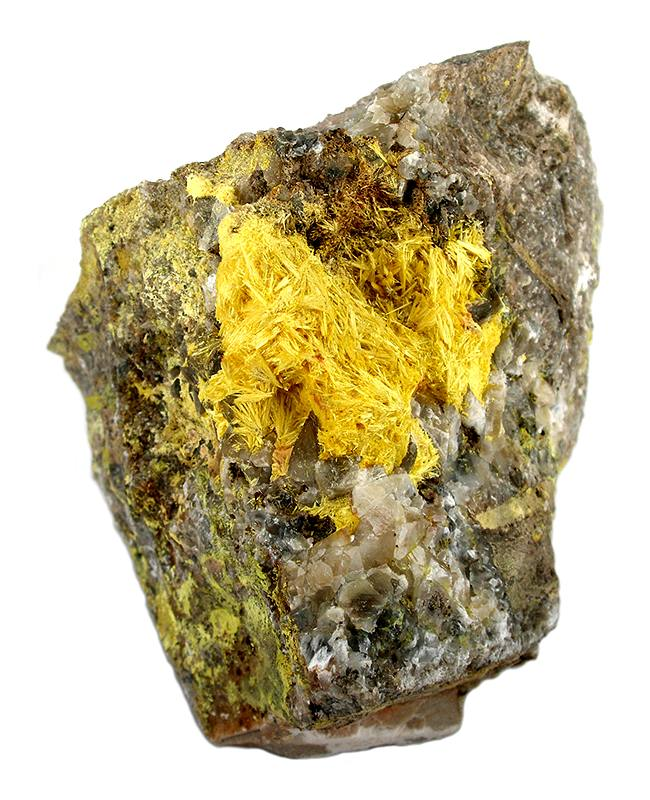
Uranophane specimen from Ambrosia Lake

Ambrosia Lake is a uranium mining district in McKinley and Cibola counties in New Mexico north of Grants that was heavily mined for uranium starting in the 1950s. It is in an anticlinal dome.

== History ==
Kerr-McGee first learned about rich uranium deposits in the area in 1955. It ran a free assay service and some prospectors had sent in samples that the company found to be high in uranium. Kerr-McGee sent an agent to buy the property. This agent instead double crossed the company and bought the site for himself. Various parties (including United Western Minerals Company of General Patrick Jay Hurley) rushed into the area to get sections of property. However Kerr-McGee wound up owning most of Ambrosia Lake.

Kerr-McGee then allied with Anderson Development Corporation, and Pacific Uranium Mines to form the Kermac Nuclear Fuels Corporation. They built a mill there. When Kerr-McGee Nuclear split into Quivira Mining and Sequoyah Fuels subsidiaries in 1983, Quivira got the Ambrosia Lake property. When Quivira was sold to Rio Algom in 1989, Rio got the mine and mill. Rio was later bought by Billiton which later became BHP.

== Cleanup ==
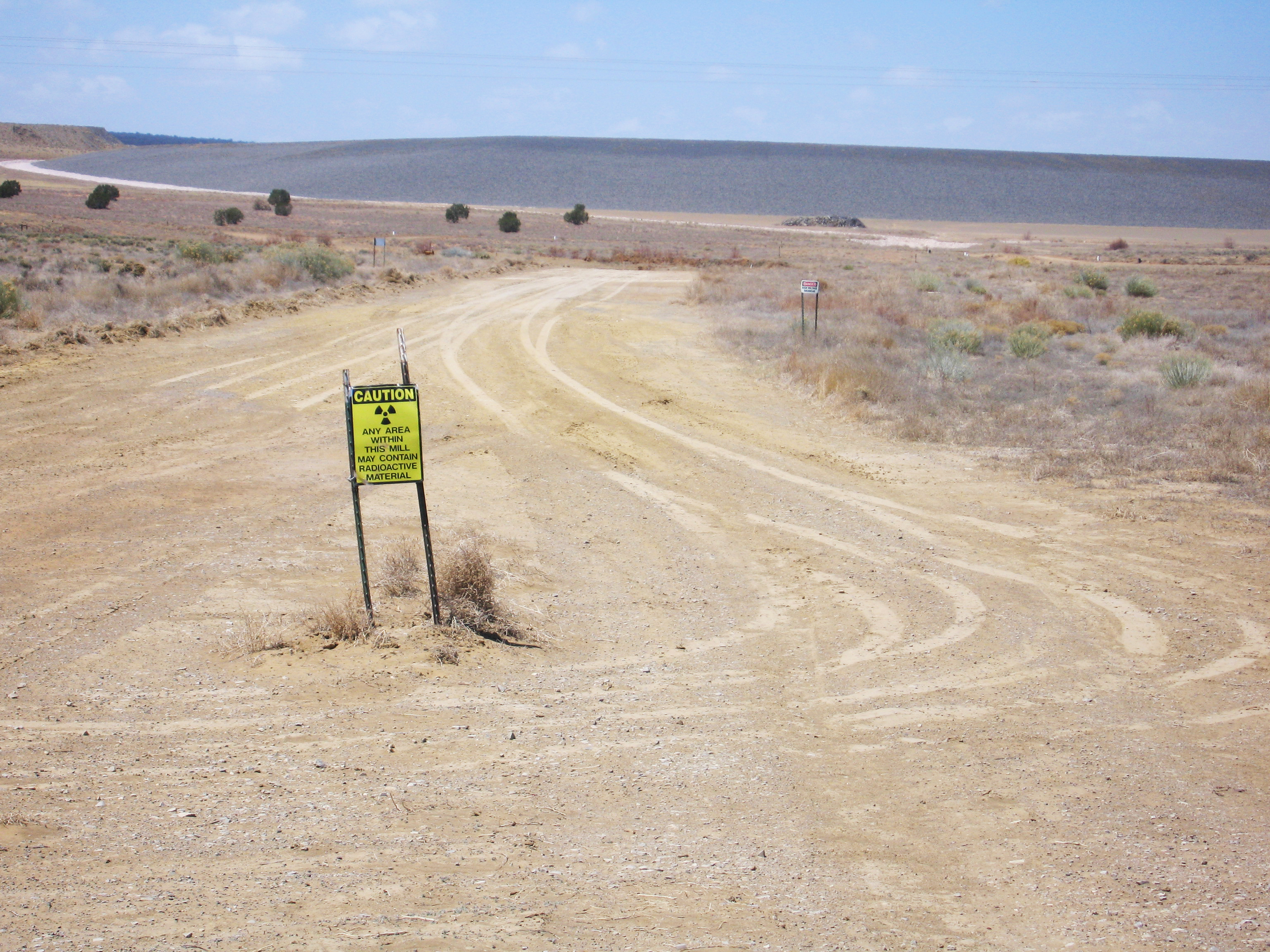
Radiation sign at Ambrosia Lake uranium mining area, New Mexico.

By 1982, approximately 111 acres (0.4 km^{2}) of radioactive tailings were left from almost 25 years of uranium extraction. Wind and rain spread the material over an area of 230 acres (0.9 km^{2}). Between 1987 and 1995, the Department of Energy remediated the site, encasing 5,200,000 cu yd (4,000,000 m^{3}) of contaminated material in a 91 acres (0.37 km^{2}) disposal cell. While the DOE/UMTRA site is closed and inactive, the former Kermac mill (under BHP ownership) continues with reclamation activities towards final closure in 2021. As of January 2026, estimated final closure is delayed to 2030. Other cleanups at mine and mill sites in the area fall under the EPA's jurisdiction.

== Notes ==
- John Masters (2004). Secret Riches: Adventures of an Unreformed Oilman. Gondolier Press. ISBN 1-896209-97-1.

== See also ==
- Uranium mining in New Mexico
- Church Rock uranium mill spill
