= Uranium mining in New Mexico =

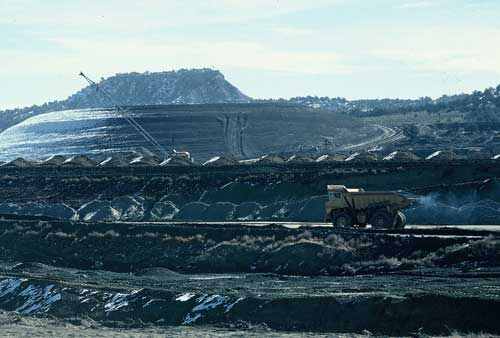
Church Rock Uranium Mill cleanup.

Uranium mining in New Mexico was a significant industry from the early 1950s until the early 1980s. Although New Mexico has the second largest identified uranium ore reserves of any state in the United States (after Wyoming), no uranium ore has been mined in New Mexico since 1998. There have been long-lasting negative impacts on the Navajo and surrounding peoples due to this activity. There are current efforts to mitigate these impacts through both local and federal efforts.

== Locations of activity ==
The first commercial uranium and vanadium deposits in New Mexico were discovered in 1918, located in the Carrizo Mountains in San Juan County. Uranium production slowly picked up across New Mexico in the 1920s, with minor amounts of autunite and torbernite being mined from within former silver mines in the White Signal District, about 15 miles (24 km) southwest of Silver City in Grant County.

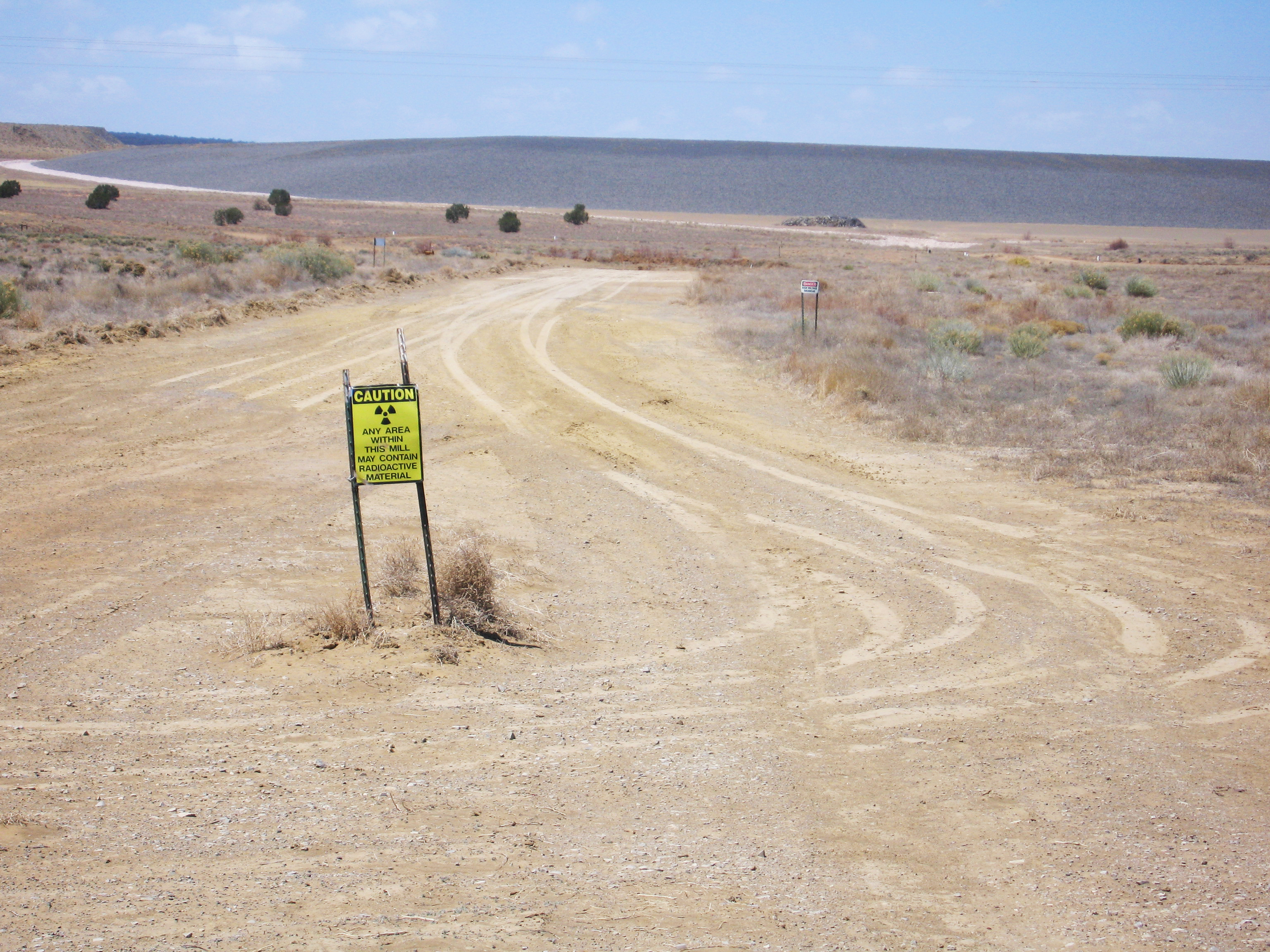
Radiation sign at Ambrosia Lake uranium mining area, New Mexico.

In the 1950s New Mexico quickly turned its focus to uranium mining after a Navajo sheepherder named Paddy Martinez discovered raw uranium on the Haystack Mountains in McKinley County, New Mexico. Almost all uranium mined in New Mexico has been found within the Grants mineral belt along the southern border of the San Juan Basin in McKinley and Cibola counties in the northwest part of the state. Stretching northwest to southeast, the mineral belt contains the areas of Gallup, Church Rock, Smith Lake, Ambrosia Lake, Grants, and Paguate or Jackpile; these areas can be broken down into three distinct mining districts including Gallup, Grants, and Laguna. Between 1950 and 1980, the majority of the uranium ore in the United States was mined out of the Grants mineral belt; the Jackpile mine was one of the most prolific mines of the Grants belt producing 25 million tons of ore at its height. Poison Canyon and Westwater Canyon are sandstone structures of the Morrison Formation dating back to the Jurassic age, where approximately 10 million pounds of uranium have been mined.

Several different entrepreneurial companies moved into the region in the 1950s, many being oil companies, as well as uranium-related businesses. The uranium-oriented companies included Rio de Oro Uranium Mines, Inc, Kermac Nuclear Fuels Corporation (a cooperative of Kerr-McGee Oil Industries, Anderson Development Corporation, and Pacific Uranium Mines, Inc), Homestake Mining Company, United Western Minerals Company (of General Patrick Jay Hurley), J H Whitney and Company, White Weld & Co., and Lisbon Uranium Corporation.

== Current activity ==
The decline of uranium mining started in 1985 after a dip in the market caused many mines to be placed on standby until further notice. Active uranium mining stopped in New Mexico in 1998. Despite this, after purchasing the Ambrosia Lake mining site in 2001, the Rio Algom mining company continued to recover uranium from the water in the flooded underground mine workings at until 2002.

General Atomics' subsidiary Rio Grande Resources was evaluating its Mt. Taylor Mine for development by in-situ recovery through its newly formed subsidiary, Grants Energy. Uranium is present in coffinite in the Westwater Canyon member of the Morrison Formation, at 3,000 feet (900 meters) below ground surface. The mine, which operated as an underground uranium mine from 1986 to 1989, has a remaining resource estimated by its owner at more than 45 thousand tons of uranium oxide.

In October 2007, a new plan was released called the Five-Year Plan. This plan was created to address and combat the uranium contamination present in Navajo Nation. The plan was directed in tandem with the administration at that time, and the Environmental Protection Agency (EPA).

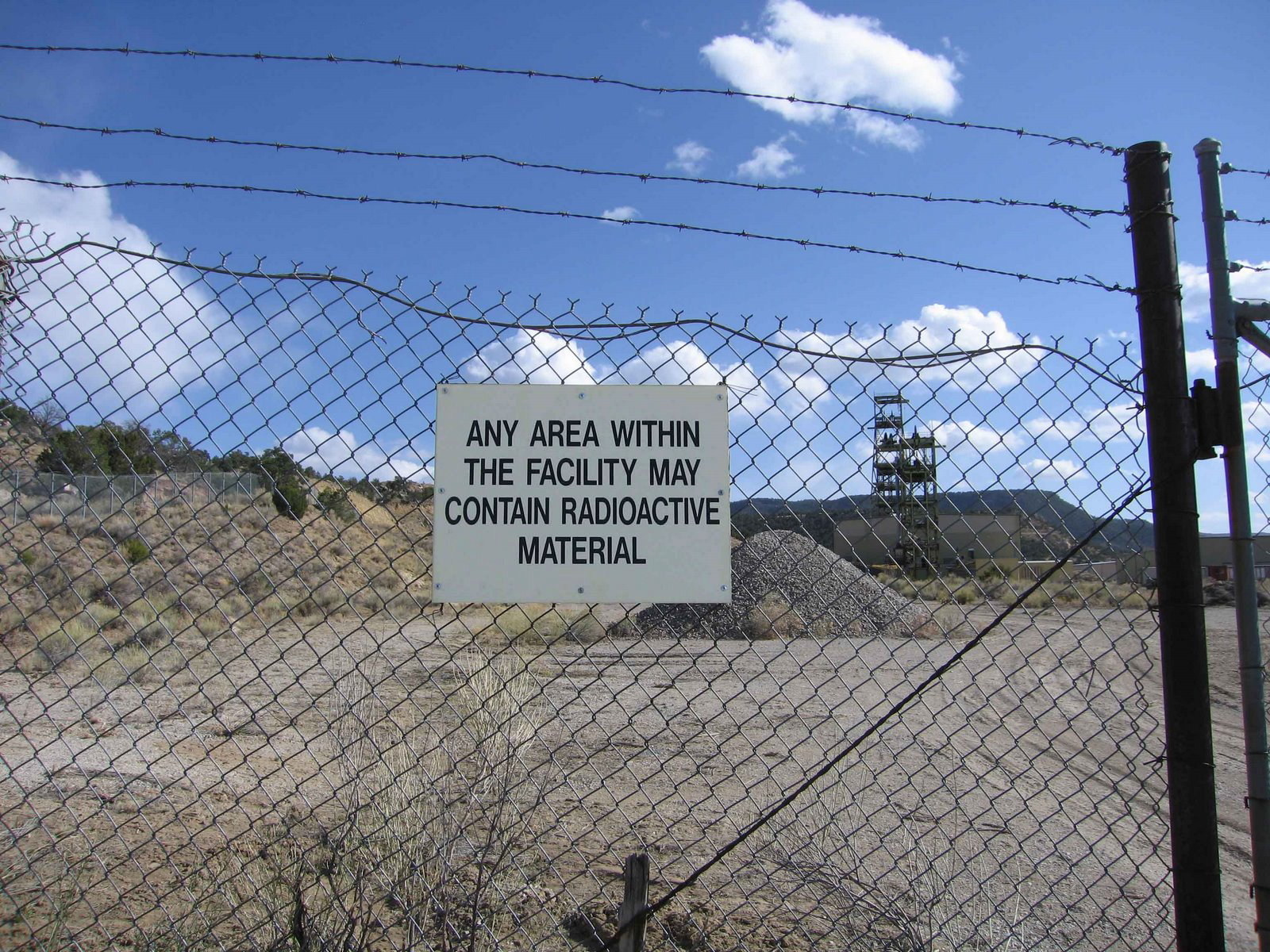
Mount Taylor uranium mine, New Mexico.

In 2012, Strathmore Minerals Corp. was applying for permits to mine their Church Rock and Roca Honda properties in the Grants Mineral Belt.

As of 2013, Uranium Resources, Inc. and Neutron Energy, a subsidiary of URI, were reportedly planning to start uranium mining in the Grants belt.

As of April 7, 2014, there were twelve uranium mines that are either in the process of licensing or actively developing in New Mexico. The federal government has since placed four new mining projects in New Mexico on a national priority list, with three of the four flagged for expedited permitting. These new uranium mining sites that are being opened by the federal government are projected and aim to generate over 500 jobs, and at least $400 million generated in local economic impact. The second Five-year plan directed by the government and the EPA, was also created in 2014, and was created to continue to build upon the work done by the first Five-Year plan.

In 2020, a new Ten-Year plan was announced and put in to action, following the previous Five-Year plans. The Ten-Year plan aims to address and clean up the contamination impacts from previous uranium mining projects in the Navajo Nation. The plan helps to identify the next steps that the government and the EPA will take in addressing human health and the environmental risks that are associated with uranium mining.

In 2021, Neutron Energy and URI were also reportedly planning to start uranium mining in the Grants belt.

In June 2024, the Nuclear Regulatory Commission in conjunction with the Department of Energy, Environmental Protection Agency, and the New Mexico Environment Department performed an audit of the groundwater contamination from the Homestake mill.

As recently as May 14, 2025, the US Government has been on the fast track for reopening and adding four new US mining projects in an effort for energy security. As of June 2025, the United States administration has pushed for the prioritization of usage of uranium deposits in New Mexico in an effort to reestablish the country as energy independent. The uranium mines that would be opened are located around Grants Mineral belt, as well as the mines of Crownpoint and Church Rock near the Navajo Nation.

== Health and environmental issues ==
New Mexico uranium miners from the 1940s and 1950s have had abnormally high rates of lung cancer, caused by radon gas in poorly ventilated underground mines. The effect was particularly pronounced among Navajo miners, and it was not until much later that the potential increase in lung cancer was attributed to working in the uranium mines. The Navajo tribe, whose reservation contains much of the known ore deposits, declared a moratorium on uranium mining in 2005.

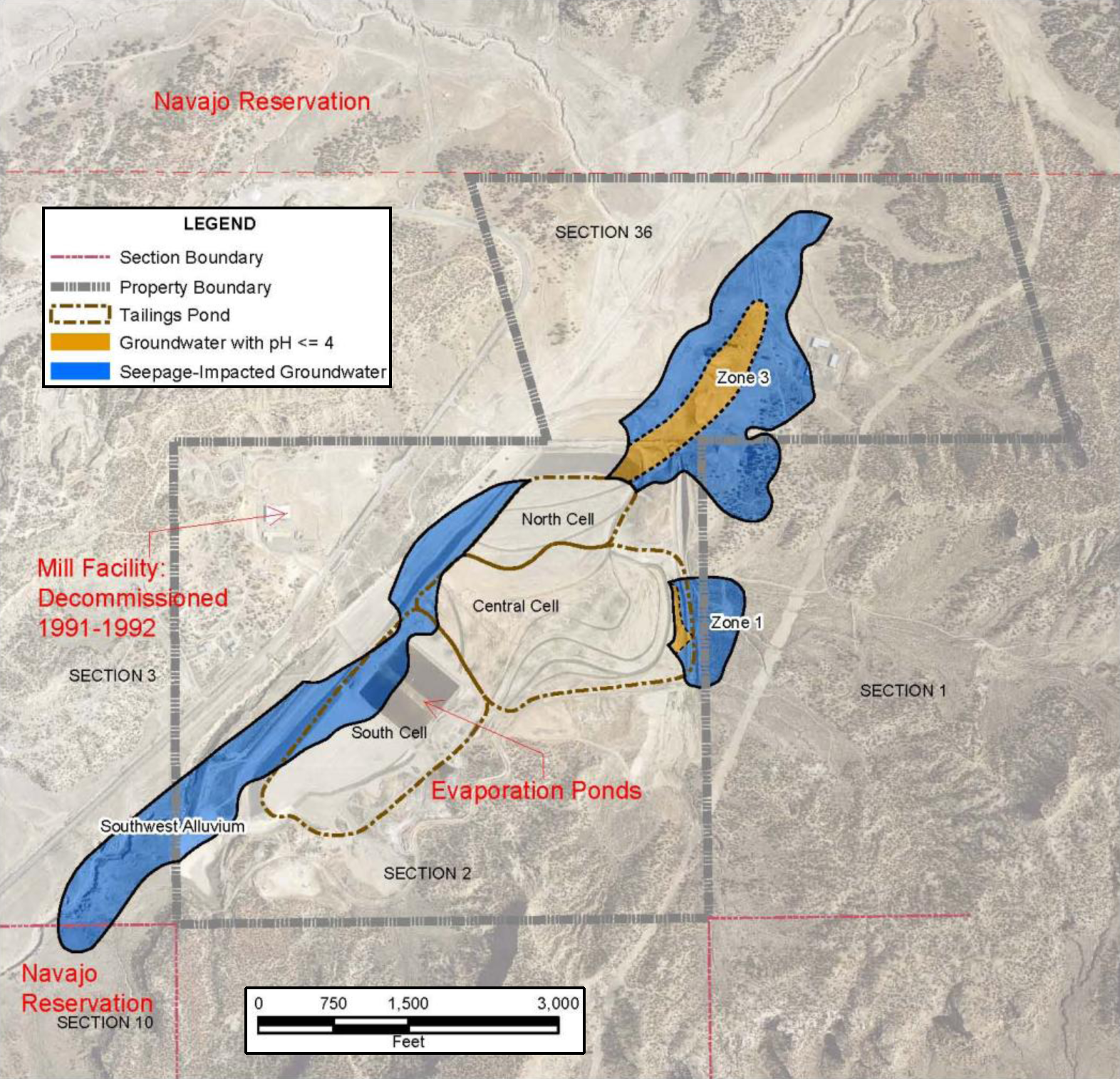
Extent of Seepage in Groundwater from the Church Rock Mill incident.

The Church Rock Mill incident was predestined by the witnessing of structural cracks in 1976. A failure in the earthen tailings dam of the mill resulted in a uranium spill on July 16, 1979; this remains as one of the largest releases of radioactive material in U.S. history. Approximately 1100 tons of radioactive waste and 95 million gallons of wastewater flowed into the Puerco River and surrounding aquifers. In May 2007, the U.S. Environmental Protection Agency (EPA) announced that it would join the Navajo Nation EPA in cleaning up radioactive contamination near the Church Rock mine. In 2017, the EPA, the Navajo Nation, and two affiliated subsidiaries of Freeport-McMoRan, Inc., entered into a settlement agreement for the cleanup of 94 abandoned uranium mines on the Navajo Nation. The settlement was valued at over $600 million, with the United States, on behalf of the Department of Interior and Department of Energy, contributing $335 million into a trust account for the cleanup.

In 1958, Homestake Mining Company opened a mill in Milan, New Mexico with the intention to process uranium mined in the surrounding areas; the mill was operational until 1990. At its closure, the milling and enrichment operations resulted in 250 million tons of radioactive tailings polluting the New Mexico soil and groundwater. The radioactive pollution continued to pose a significant health threat, and as a result, in 2022, Barrick Gold, previously Homestake Mining Co., attempted to buy out residents' homes and pass responsibility for cleanup to the federal government.

As of 2020, Pregnant Navajo women have a 2.67-2.8 times higher concentration of uranium in their urine than non-Navajo pregnant women. This suggests contamination is still a present danger to the Navajo.

== Additional effects on the Navajo people ==
See also: Uranium mining and the Navajo people

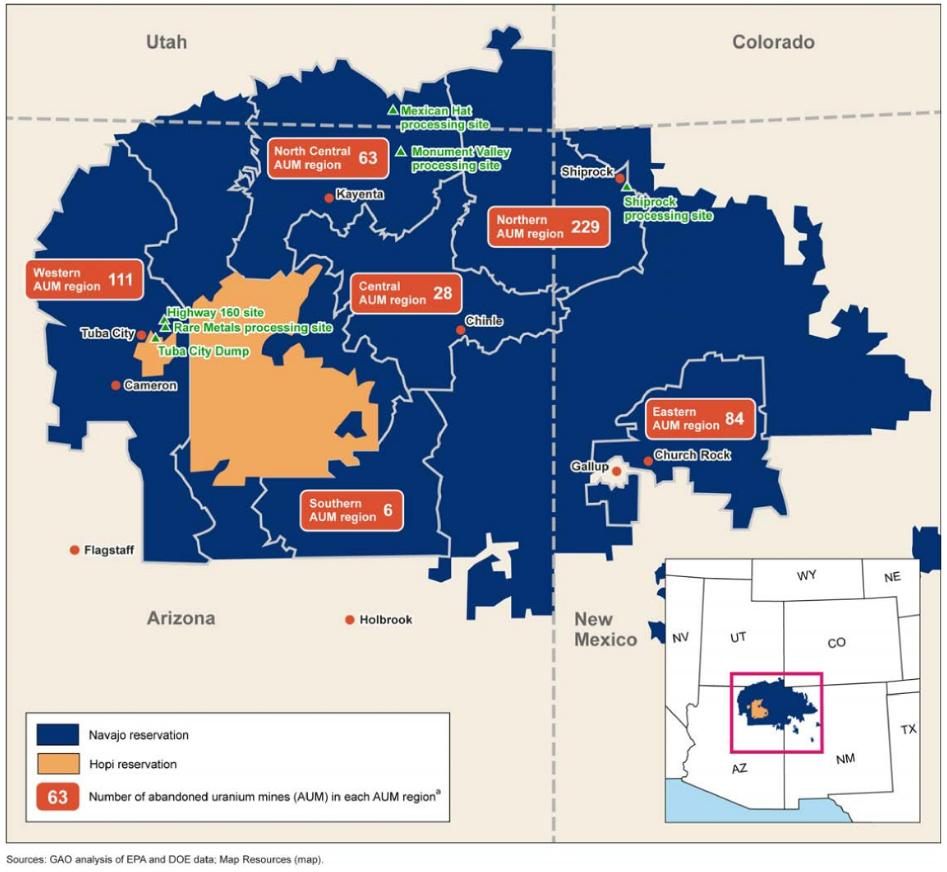
Map of the Navajo and Hopi Reservations.

Many of the uranium mines were located on Navajo Nation land. This has had long-lasting negative effects on the people living in the region. There are over 500 abandoned uranium mines on Navajo Nation land that need to be cleaned up. Many are actively in that process, while there are still hundreds that are not. There is a Superfund process to deal with contamination from these mines, which is controlled by the Environmental Protection Agency (EPA).

Through coordination between the EPA, Bureau of Indian Affairs, Nuclear Regulatory Commission, Department of Energy, and Indian Health Service, there was a 5 year plan in 2007 to address uranium contamination in the Navajo nation. A second 5 year plan was established in 2014 to continue the efforts at decontamination. A later 10 year plan was established for 2020-2029 to continue efforts at mitigating risks posed by former uranium mining on Navajo land.

== See also ==
- The Navajo People and Uranium Mining
- Anaconda, New Mexico
- Mount Taylor (New Mexico)
