= Cimarron Fuel Fabrication Site =

US nuclear fuel production facility

Coordinates: 35°52′45″N 97°35′06″W

The Cimarron Fuel Fabrication Site was a nuclear fuel production facility located along the southern bank of the Cimarron River near Crescent, Oklahoma. The site was operated by the Kerr-McGee Corporation (KMC) from 1965 to 1975.

== History ==
Some of the byproducts and waste from Kerr-McGee's uranium and thorium processing at its Cushing, Oklahoma refinery were transported to Cimarron in the 1960s.

The Atomic Energy Commission (AEC) issued Radioactive Materials License SNM-928 in 1965 to Kerr-McGee Corporation for the uranium fuel fabrication facilities at the Cimarron site. In 1970, the AEC issued Radioactive Materials License SNM-1174 in 1970 to KMC for the mixed oxide fuel fabrication (MOFF) facilities at the same site.

The production plant in Cimarron made uranium fuel and MOX driver fuel pins for use in the Fast Flux Test Facility at the Hanford Site in Washington State. Along with the Nuclear Materials and Equipment Corporation (NUMEC), Kerr-McGee made the fuel pins for FFTF cores 1 and 2 from 1973 to 1975. The pins were quality tested by the Plutonium Finishing Plant at Hanford. The MOX pins were produced by the "Co-precipitation of Plutonium Nitrate and Uranium Nitrate solution" method, which was relatively new at the time. The decommissioning of the Cimarron plant was initiated in 1976.

In 1983, Kerr-McGee Nuclear split into Quivira Mining Corporation and Sequoyah Fuels Corporation, although both were still owned by KMC. Sequoyah acquired the Cimarron plant. Sequoyah was then sold to General Atomics in 1988, but Kerr-McGee kept control of Cimarron under a subsidiary named the Cimarron Corporation. In 2005, Kerr-McGee formed a new subsidiary named Tronox, and it then gained ownership of Cimarron. Tronox was then spun off as an independent company in 2006, a few months before KMC was bought by the Anadarko Petroleum Corporation. Tronox went bankrupt in 2008-09, blaming in part the environmental debts it inherited from KMC. Tronox shareholders later sued Anadarko Petroleum for having misled investors.

== Investigations ==
In January 1975, the United States General Accounting Office (GAO) sent a report to Congress entitled, Federal Investigations Into Certain Health, Safety, Quality Control and Criminal Allegations at Kerr-McGee Nuclear Corporation. The report, signed by the Comptroller General of the United States, documented the GAO's findings on: (1) working conditions at the Kerr-McGee Corporation in Crescent, Oklahoma; (2) radiological contamination and death of Karen Silkwood (an employee); (3) Kerr-McGee's quality assurance practices; and (4) harassment of Kerr-McGee employees. The investigating agencies involved were the Federal Bureau of Investigation, the Atomic Energy Commission, the Energy Research and Development Administration, and the Nuclear Regulatory Commission. These agencies studied Karen Silkwood's contamination with plutonium; the dispersal of uranium pellets on the grounds of the Cimarron plant; the unauthorized removal of nuclear material from the plant, and other "material unaccounted for".

== Karen Silkwood ==
Karen Silkwood was employed by Kerr-McGee's Cimarron facility when she died in a mysterious car crash on November 13, 1974. At the time, she was engaged in whistleblowing activities to expose what she and the Oil, Chemical & Atomic Workers Union believed were unsafe practices and falsification of records at the facility.

The abovementioned GAO report found that Silkwood had been contaminated with plutonium on November 5, 6 and 7, 1974. On November 5, she was contaminated by the gloves of a laboratory glovebox used for working with radioactive materials. However, when Kerr-McGee examined and tested the gloves, no leaks were detected. On November 6, she was again measured to have plutonium contamination. And on November 7, her nose and other parts of her body were found to be contaminated, as was her roommate Sherri Ellis and their apartment.

In 1985, in an out-of-court settlement with Kerr-McGee, Silkwood's family was awarded US$1.38 million for the plutonium contamination she experienced while working at the Cimarron facility.
