= Tronox =

American chemical company

Tronox Limited
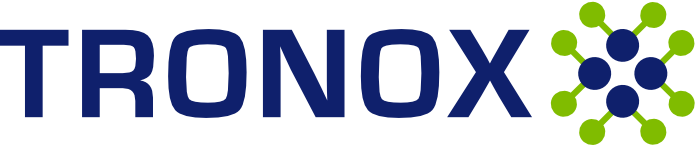
- Type: Public company
- Traded as: NYSE: TROX
- Industry: Mining; chemical manufacturing
- Revenue: ▼US$2.90 billion (2025)
- Net income: ▼ −US$470 million (2025)
- Website: www.tronox.com

Tronox Limited is an American worldwide chemical company involved in the titanium products industry with approximately 5,700 employees. Following its acquisition of the mineral sands business formerly belonging to South Africa's Exxaro Resources, Tronox is the largest fully integrated seller and marketer of titanium dioxide (TiO_{2}) pigment, which provides brightness to applications such as coatings, plastics and paper. Tronox mines titanium-bearing mineral sands and operates upgrading facilities that produce high-grade titanium feedstock materials, pig iron and other minerals, including the rare earth-bearing mineral, monazite. Tronox also sells titanium ore—the main feedstock of titanium dioxide—and zircon directly to customers.

Tronox is the third-largest titanium feedstock producer, with approximately 10% of global titanium ore production; and the second-largest producer of zircon, with approximately 20% of global production. The company also has an electrolytic and speciality chemicals business that services the paper and battery industries. Formerly a part of the Kerr-McGee Chemical Corporation and based in Oklahoma City since it was spun off from its parent in 2005, the company announced in June 2012 that it was moving its headquarters to Stamford, Connecticut.

The company was spun off in part to offload its parent company Kerr-McGee's legacy of generations of environmental dumping of toxic waste across 22 states. According to one report, "Kerr-McGee, rather than pay for the environmental mess it created, decided to shift the liabilities between 2002 and 2006 into Tronox. Kerr-McGee, meanwhile, kept its valuable oil and gas assets." Tronox did not reveal the massive hidden liabilities to investors, and after they became known, Tronox dropped to a penny stock in 2009. In response, shareholders sued Anadarko Petroleum (successor to Kerr-McGee) for keeping the scope of the environmental disaster a secret. In addition the US federal government sued Anadarko to pay for the cleanup, and in April 2014 settled on the largest environmental contamination settlement in American history, over $5 billion.

== History ==
The company went public in 2005, when Oklahoma City-based Kerr-McGee, which had previously owned the company entirely, issued shares via an initial public offering on November 21, 2005. It became an independent company in March 2006.

In the first quarter of 2006, Tronox replaced Meade Instruments on the S&P SmallCap 600 index, when Kerr-McGee distributed the rest of its stock in Tronox under its former NYSE symbol TRX.B, a class B security. TRX.B started regular-way trading on March 31, 2006.

In 2008, the company's stock price declined significantly, and both classes of stock became penny stocks.

In September 2008, the company's stock moved from the NYSE to OTC.

On 14 January 2009, Tronox filed Chapter 11 bankruptcy. It specified that this action did not include the company's non-USA operations.

In 2009, shareholders of Tronox sued Anadarko Petroleum (successor to Kerr-McGee) for having misled investors about the large environmental and other debts Tronox would inherit from its parent corporation. The environmental pollution included polluting Lake Mead in Nevada with rocket fuel, leaving behind radioactive waste piles throughout the territory of the Navajo Nation and dumping carcinogenic creosote in communities throughout the East, Midwest and South at its wood-treating facilities.

In 2009, the Huntsman Corporation announced it would buy certain of Tronox's assets, such as its factories. In late 2009, Tronox terminated this deal.

Tronox emerged from Chapter 11 bankruptcy on February 14, 2011.

Tom Casey became CEO in October 2011.

On June 15, 2012, Tronox announced that it had completed the acquisition of Exxaro Mineral Sands and combined both entities under Tronox Limited, an Australian holding company. Describing the benefits of the combination, Tronox Limited CEO Tom Casey said, "We now have the ability to sell into a lucrative titanium feedstock market while assuring our titanium dioxide customers that we have the supply to deliver quality products at reasonable prices."

In April 2014, the federal government reached a $5 billion settlement with Anadarko (successor to Kerr-McGee) in the largest environmental contamination case in American history. According to one report, "Kerr-McGee, rather than pay for the environmental mess it created, decided to shift the liabilities between 2002 and 2006 into Tronox. Kerr-McGee, meanwhile, kept its valuable oil and gas assets." The cost to clean up the mess inherited by Tronox from Kerr-McGee was estimated by the courts to be over $5 billion. There are contaminated sites in 22 states and the Navajo Nation. "Among the dozens of locations targeted for cleanup under the settlement is a former chemical manufacturing site in Nevada that has led to contamination in Lake Mead, abandoned uranium mines in and around the Navajo Nation, and a Superfund site in Gloucester, N.J., polluted by thorium."

On 10 April 2019, Tronox acquired the Saudi Arabian titanium dioxide pigment manufacturer Cristal Global.

== Locations ==
=== Global headquarters ===
- Stamford, Connecticut

=== Mineral sands operations ===
- Namakwa Sands, South Africa
- KwaZulu-Natal (KZN) Sands, South Africa
- Cooljarloo, Western Australia
- Chandala Processing Plant, Western Australia
- Pooncarie, New South Wales

=== Pigment productions ===
- Bahia, Brazil
- Hamilton, Mississippi, United States
- Bunbury, Australia
- Kwinana, Australia
- Thann, Haut-Rhin, France
- Stallingborough, United Kingdom
- Yanbu, Saudi Arabia

== Kerr-McGee spin-off ==
Kerr-McGee spun off its chemical business circa 2005-2006 after demands were made by corporate raider and major Kerr-McGee shareholder Carl Icahn.

Among other things, Tronox inherited several radioactive waste sites from Kerr-McGee. These include the Cimarron Fuel Fabrication Site and the Rare Earths Facility. They are, as of 2014, still undergoing cleanup.

It also inherited the Henderson, Nevada "BMI" site. This site had supplied Magnesium and other chemicals beginning around World War II. It eventually leaked perchlorate (used in rocket fuel) into the water table, which subsequently contaminated Lake Mead and the Colorado River, which supply water to millions of people.

Exiting bankruptcy in February 2011, Tronox's Chapter 11 plan created the Anadarko litigation trust to pursue Tronox's lawsuit against Anadarko and Kerr-McGee. Tronox has transferred an 88% share of its interest in the lawsuit to the federal government.
