= Sequoyah Fuels Corporation =

Decommissioned uranium processing facility

Coordinates: 35.5024°N 95.0830°W

Sequoyah Fuels Corporation owned and operated a uranium processing plant near Gore, Oklahoma. The company was created in 1983 as a subsidiary of Kerr-McGee. In 1986 there was a rupture of an overfilled cylinder. In 1988 it was sold to General Atomics. It was decommissioned in 1993, stopping all production.

== Uranium processing plant ==
The plant started construction in 1968 and began operation in 1970. It converted yellowcake uranium into uranium hexafluoride. The plant was operated under Kerr-McGee Nuclear Corporation. In 1983 KMNC split into Quivira Mining Corporation and Sequoyah Fuels Corporation. Sequoyah Fuels ended up with control of the plant.

A leak and explosion in 1986 left one worker dead and extreme groundwater and soil contamination that extended past the 600-acre site.

In 1987 it started converting depleted uranium hexafluoride into depleted uranium tetrafluoride. Then in 1988 Sequoyah Fuels Corporation was sold to General Atomics. The plant then ceased operation in 1993.

In 2008 a company named International Isotopes said it would buy equipment and intellectual property from the Sequoyah Fuels plant. The equipment would be used in a new location. It would be used for converting depleted uranium hexafluoride to depleted uranium tetrafluoride.

== The 1986 Sequoyah Corporation Fuels Release in Oklahoma ==
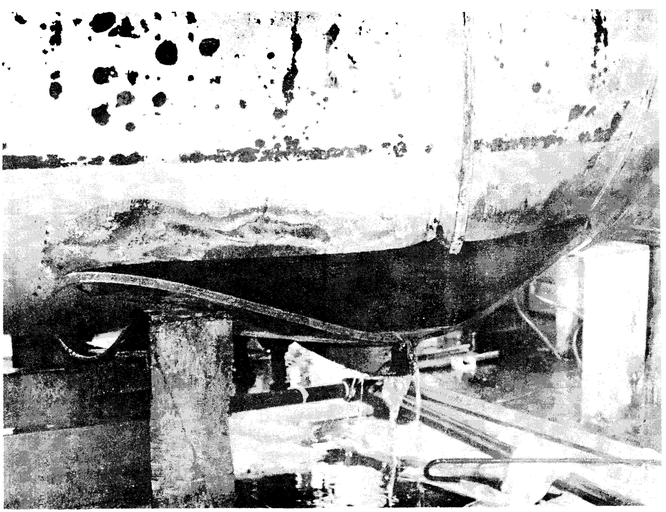
Photograph of the rupture in the uranium hexafluoride container

On January 4, 1986, Sequoyah Fuels Corporation experienced a rupture of an overfilled cylinder which killed 26-year-old worker, James Harrison and hospitalized 37 of the 42 onsite workers. 60 area residents were also hospitalized. The American Journal of Public Health describes the plant as having "never fully recovered" from the accident.

"By 8:45 AM much of the UF6 had solidified and no more could be removed. Workers were then instructed to liquefy the UF6 by heating it in a steam chest, a direct violation of company policy."

Toxic clouds from the event drifted across the plant and nearby rural areas, which exposed workers and raised immediate alarm among residents and state officials. Subsequent research identified the Sequoyah event as one of the least-publicized yet most severe radiological accidents in the Southwest.

Another accident involving the release of UF_{6} occurred in 1992. The plant ceased production operations in 1993 and was decommissioned.

=== Environmental impact ===
The leak on January 4, 1986 sent out dangerous fumes and radioactive dust that spread beyond the facility, hurting staff and people nearby while leaving lasting pollution worries across the 600-acre zone and surrounding areas. Government documents along with health studies have called it a major radiation event in the U.S. Southwest, serious but rarely talked about.

Work at the plant led to leftover materials tainted with uranium, like raffinate gunk and various residues, which soiled ground layers and nearby water below and around the area. Government checks along with NRC reports confirm ongoing pollution in underground water, identifying soils and sediments as principal media of concern requiring remediation or long-term management. These contaminates were found sitting in ponds, tanks, plus makeshift storage. Nearby communities along with Native groups said there's over a thousand tons of the raffinate sludge around; handling its removal and getting rid of it came up during talks about fixing the place.

The site went through reviews by several agencies, plus assessments on environmental effects, along with disputed permit choices. Instead of skipping details, the NRC released a full report (NUREG-1888) looking at ways to reclaim the area. Meanwhile, the EPA and local authorities helped supervise plans for cleaning up, checking progress, and working out deals with the firm. Cleanup ideas involved hauling away sludge elsewhere, digging up contaminated dirt or sealing it off, keeping an eye on water underground while fixing issues found, and setting up lasting management rules.

== See also ==
- Church Rock uranium mill spill
- Uranium mining in the United States
- Kerr-McGee
- General Atomics
- Uranium hexafluoride
