= Karen Silkwood =

Labor union activist and laboratory technician (1946-1974)

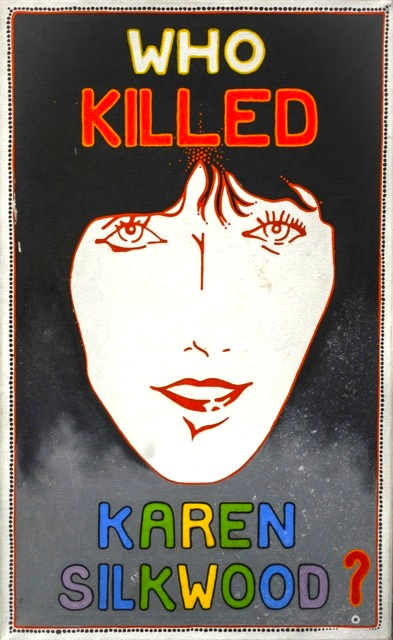
- Poster from the Christic Institute archives.
- Born: Karen Gay Silkwood; February 19, 1946; Longview, Texas, U.S.
- Died: November 13, 1974 (aged 28) near Crescent, Oklahoma, U.S.
- Cause of death: Car crash, unclear circumstances
- Resting place: Danville Cemetery, Kilgore, Texas, U.S.
- Occupation: Laboratory technician
- Spouse: William Meadows (m. 1965; div. 1972)
- Children: 3

Karen Gay Silkwood (February 19, 1946 – November 13, 1974) was an American laboratory technician and labor union activist known for reporting concerns about corporate practices related to health and safety at Kerr-McGee Cimarron Fuel Fabrication Site, a nuclear facility, in Crescent, Oklahoma.

She worked at the Kerr-McGee Cimarron Fuel Fabrication Site making plutonium pellets. She was the first woman ever elected to the company union's negotiating team. After testifying to the Atomic Energy Commission in Washington D.C. about her safety concerns, she was found to have plutonium contamination in her body and her home. Her house had to be stripped and decontaminated, and some of her property destroyed. In addition to Silkwood, her boyfriend Drew Stephens and her roommate Sherri Ellis were sent to Los Alamos National Laboratory for in-depth testing to determine the amount of plutonium in their bodies. While driving to meet with a New York Times journalist and an official of her union's national office, she died in a car crash, the circumstances of which were never explained entirely.

Silkwood's family sued Kerr-McGee for her plutonium contamination. The company settled out of court for US$1.38 million, while not admitting liability. Her story was chronicled in Mike Nichols's 1983 Academy Award-nominated movie Silkwood in which she was portrayed by Meryl Streep.

== Education and personal life ==
Karen Gay Silkwood was born in 1946 in Longview, Texas, and raised in Nederland, Texas. She lived with her mother Merle, father Bill, and sisters Rosemary and Linda. In high school, Karen was a straight 'A' student and a member of the National Honor Society. Chemistry was her best subject. In the fall of 1964, she enrolled at Lamar State College of Technology in Beaumont, Texas on a scholarship from the Business and Professional Women's Club.

In 1965, Silkwood dropped out of college and eloped with William Meadows, an oil pipeline worker, with whom she had three children. After the couple filed for bankruptcy due to Meadows' excessive spending habits, and after his refusal to end an extramarital affair, Silkwood left him in 1972 and relocated to Oklahoma City where she worked briefly as a hospital clerk.

== Employment and union activities ==
In August 1972, Silkwood was hired as a metallography laboratory technician with the Kerr-McGee Corporation at their Cimarron River plutonium production plant near Crescent, Oklahoma that had opened two years prior. She also joined the Oil, Chemical & Atomic Workers Union (OCAW) local.

In November 1972, when the union's contract had expired, she participated in a strike to protest poor working conditions. Kerr-McGee succeeded in breaking the strike by hiring people from the surrounding area to cross the picket line. The company's managers also began "working behind the scenes to entice workers to sign a petition calling for a decertification election to eliminate the union." The strike ended after ten weeks after employees were threatened with termination. In the early part of 1974, Kerr-McGee was behind in production and began to schedule employees to work seven-day workweeks as well as twelve-hour shifts. The plant experienced a sudden increase in spills and contamination events. On July 13, 1974, almost two years into her employment, Silkwood experienced her first contamination which occurred in the emission spectroscopy lab. Testing discovered contamination within the air filter.

In August 1974, Silkwood was elected to the OCAW local's three-person bargaining committee, the first woman to hold such a position at the company. It was a critical time for the local as the decertification drive had collected enough signatures to force an election on October 16. Silkwood's specific union duties included investigating health and safety issues. She discovered at the Cimarron plant what she considered to be numerous violations of health regulations, such as exposure of workers to contamination, faulty respiratory equipment, and improper storage of samples. She believed the lack of sufficient shower facilities was increasing the risk of employee contamination. She also found evidence of missing or misplaced plutonium.

On September 26, 1974, Silkwood and the two other committee members attended a meeting in Washington, D.C., with Tony Mazzocchi, OCAW's legislative director. The committee members voiced their complaints about the dangerous workplace conditions and sought advice on how to win the upcoming decertification election. In their discussions, Mazzocchi learned that the committee members (and presumably the rest of the Cimarron plant) were not adequately informed about the hazardous material they were working with. He later wrote, "When I explained the connection between plutonium exposure and cancer, it took Karen by surprise." And so they made plans that day to have two atomic scientists from the University of Minnesota come speak to the Cimarron workers. Mazzocchi recalled how Silkwood took him aside at one point and said, "You know, there's some other problems that I'd like to talk to you about.":

I said, "What are they?" She said, "I work in a quality-control lab, and I noticed the lab technician would use a felt pen on the X-ray to cover over that little thin line that showed a crack in the control rod welds." And she told me there was some fooling with the computer data, too. I said, "Look, Karen, if you could prove that, I think we could use it to beat the company and improve the conditions in that facility."

At the conclusion of the meeting, Mazzocchi and his staffer Steve Wodka counseled that the best hope for survival of the Cimarron workers and their local was to raise awareness about Kerr-McGee's practices with the Atomic Energy Commission (AEC) and the national press.

To that end, the OCAW initiated an aggressive whistleblowing campaign. They claimed that "the Kerr-McGee plant had manufactured faulty fuel rods, falsified product inspection records, and risked employee safety". The union threatened litigation. On September 27, Silkwood testified to the AEC about having been contaminated with plutonium, and she alleged that safety standards had been relaxed because of a need to increase production. She appeared at the AEC hearings along with the two other committee members who likewise testified that Kerr-McGee was endangering its workers. The whistleblowing effort and the visibility it brought—combined with the educational sessions on plutonium toxicity that Silkwood arranged with the atomic scientists (attended by one hundred of her co-workers)—helped fight off decertification. The Cimarron local voted 80–61 in October to keep the OCAW as their bargaining agent.

On November 5, 1974, Silkwood performed a routine self-check that showed almost 400 times the legal limit for plutonium contamination. She was decontaminated at the plant and sent home with a testing kit to collect urine and feces for further analysis. Although there was plutonium on the inner portions of the gloves which she had been using, the gloves did not have any leaks or perforations according to tests performed subsequently by Kerr-McGee personnel. This suggests the contamination had come not from inside the glovebox, but from some other source.

The next morning, as she left for a union meeting, Silkwood again tested positive for plutonium, although she had performed only paperwork tasks that morning. She was given a more intensive decontamination. On November 7, as she entered the plant, she was found to be severely contaminated, even expelling contaminated air from her lungs. A health physics team accompanied her back to her home and found plutonium traces on several surfaces, especially in the bathroom and the refrigerator. When the house was later stripped and decontaminated, some of her property had to be destroyed. Silkwood, her boyfriend Drew Stephens, and her roommate Sherri Ellis were sent to Los Alamos National Laboratory for in-depth testing to determine the amount of plutonium in their bodies.

There were questions about how Silkwood became contaminated during this three-day period from November 5-7. She said the contamination in the bathroom may have occurred when she spilled her urine sample on the morning of November 7. This was consistent with the fact that the samples she collected at home had extremely high levels of plutonium, while the samples collected in "fresh" jars at the plant and at Los Alamos showed much lower levels.

Silkwood concluded that someone working for Kerr-McGee Corp. had deliberately contaminated her, whereas its management alleged that she had contaminated herself in order to tarnish the company's reputation. According to Richard Rashke's book The Killing of Karen Silkwood, the particular type of plutonium found in Silkwood's home came from a Cimarron production area, pellet lot 29, where she did not work. Starting in August, the pellet lot 29 samples were kept in a Kerr-McGee vault to which she had no access.

== Death ==
By November, Silkwood believed she had assembled sufficient documentation, including company papers, to corroborate her claims against Kerr-McGee. She decided to go public with this evidence and contacted David Burnham, a New York Times journalist Mazzocchi had referred to her. Burnham had previously broken the Frank Serpico police corruption case and was now researching atomic energy issues.

On November 13, 1974, Silkwood attended a 5:30 p.m. union meeting, along with ten other members of the OCAW local, at the Hub Cafe in Crescent. She made a brief presentation and sipped iced tea. Another attendee at the meeting, Wanda Jean Jung, stated in a sworn affidavit in January 1975 that Silkwood had a folder, a spiral notebook, and a packet of documents with her at the cafe. During a break in the meeting, Jung said she spoke with Silkwood who was crying quietly and admitted how frightened she was "that she had been so badly contaminated, she would eventually get cancer and die from the plutonium in her lungs." But then, Jung stated in her affidavit, Karen pointed to her documents and said, "there was one thing she was glad about ... that she had all the proof concerning falsification of records. As she said this, she clenched her hand more firmly on the folder and notebook she was holding. She told me she was on her way to meet Steve Wodka and a New York Times reporter ... to give them this material."

At 7:10 p.m., Silkwood left the meeting, got into her 1973 white Honda Civic and drove alone toward Oklahoma City, about 30 miles (48 km) away, to meet with Burnham and Wodka. Less than 30 minutes later, Silkwood's body was discovered in her smashed-up car, 7.3 miles from the cafe. The car had run off the left side of State Highway 74, traveled some distance along the grass shoulder, and then struck the wing wall of a concrete culvert 0.11 miles (180 m) south of the intersection with West Industrial Road (35.85°N 97.58°W). The impact from hitting the wall caused her to be impaled by her steering wheel and pinned to the roof of the Honda Civic. She was pronounced dead at the scene.

Silkwood's car contained none of the documents she had been holding in the meeting at the Hub Cafe. The Oklahoma state trooper at the crash site remembers that he found one or two tablets of the sedative methaqualone (Quaalude) in the car, and what he believed were two marijuana joints. The coroner found 0.35 milligrams of methaqualone in her blood—"a therapeutic dose is .25 mg, a toxic dose, .50 mg." The Oklahoma Highway Patrol report concluded that she fell asleep at the wheel and died as a result of an accident.

The OCAW hired a crash investigator, A. O. Pipkin Jr., to examine the car and the scene of the crash. Based on his examination, Silkwood had not fallen asleep while driving: "The steering wheel was bent back on the sides, proving she'd been wide awake and hanging on tight as she tried to maintain control." In support of his notion that she was awake, he added two other observations. The first was the anomalous fact that her car had veered from the right lane to the left shoulder:

"In most one-vehicle accidents where the driver has gone to sleep, or because of impaired abilities," Pipkin noted, "the vehicle has always gone off to the right because of the contour of the road, namely the crown." The second thing Pipkin reported was that the Honda tracks in the grass showed the car did not drift, but was actually out of control before it left the highway. "The only way that this car could have been put in that attitude," he wrote, "was either an impact by an unknown vehicle or a combination of an impact by an unknown vehicle and driver over-reaction and subsequent loss of control."

But most significantly, Pipkin found damage to the rear of the vehicle which, according to her friends, had not been present before. As the crash was entirely a head-on, front-end collision, it didn't explain the fresh dents on the left rear fender and the bumper above it. A microscopic analysis of the rear of the car revealed paint chips that could have come only from impact by another vehicle. Other possible explanations of the reported dents on the back of the car include: Karen Silkwood claiming to have driven off the road on October 31, 1974, with the rear of her car crashed into a fence post in a drainage ditch, and damage done by the tow truck drivers retrieving the car from the November 13 accident.

In light of Pipkin's findings, some friends and journalists theorized that Silkwood's car was rammed from behind with intent to cause a fatal crash. OCAW officials Mazzocchi and Wodka did not believe it was premeditated murder because that stretch of highway is flat, and the odds of her hitting an obstruction like a concrete culvert were so remote. Instead, they suspected it was an attempt, which went tragically awry, to scare and intimidate her into stopping her whistleblowing and returning the documents. Another hypothesis is that she was being chased to force her to halt. She drove evasively, including speeding along the left grass shoulder, and while looking behind her or to her right at the chase car, she didn't realize until too late that she was racing toward the culvert.

Due to concerns about contamination, the Atomic Energy Commission and the State Medical Examiner requested analysis of Silkwood's organs by the Los Alamos Tissue Analysis Program. On November 18, she was buried in Kilgore, Texas.

Silkwood's plutonium contamination and the mysterious circumstances of her death became a national news story. It aroused public suspicion and resulted in a federal investigation of Cimarron plant security. National Public Radio reported that the investigation determined 20 to 30 kilograms (44–66 lb) of plutonium had been misplaced at the plant. The unaccounted-for nuclear material generated speculation as to its whereabouts. Richard Rashke suggested that the missing plutonium may have been stolen by "a plutonium smuggling ring" given that the quantity was enough to make three or four nuclear bombs. He added that security at the Cimarron plant was so lax that workers could easily smuggle out finished plutonium pellets.

Kerr-McGee closed its nuclear fuel plants in 1975. The Department of Energy (DOE) reported the Cimarron plant as fully decontaminated and decommissioned by 1994.

== Silkwood v. Kerr-McGee ==
In November 1976, Karen's father Bill Silkwood and his attorney Daniel Sheehan filed a complaint against Kerr-McGee for gross negligence in handling the plutonium that contaminated her. Bill Silkwood asked for $160,000 "for Karen's loss of property, personal injury, and mental anguish, and as a punishment to Kerr-McGee and the others named in the complaint."

The months leading up to the trial were likewise filled with controversy. According to Rashke, officials investigating Kerr-McGee's operations and the circumstances of the car crash were themselves at risk: "People had been tailed and forced off lonely roads by speeding cars. Two shadowy characters about to be subpoenaed suddenly packed up their attaché cases and fled to West Germany. One apparently healthy police officer about to be deposed died of a heart attack. There was no autopsy. Someone tried to murder a Kerr-McGee manager who knew too much. Someone tried to assassinate Bill Taylor, the chief investigator for the legal team representing the Silkwood family. And then there were all those strange clicks on everyone's telephone."

The trial occurred in spring of 1979. Gerry Spence was the chief attorney for the Silkwood estate, assisted by Sheehan, Arthur Angel and James Ikard. William Paul was chief attorney for Kerr-McGee. The plaintiff presented evidence that the autopsy showed Silkwood was contaminated with plutonium at the time of her death. To prove the contamination was sustained at the plant, evidence was given by a series of witnesses who were former employees of the facility.

The defense relied on expert witness Dr. George Voelz, a high-ranking scientist at Los Alamos. Voelz said he believed the contamination in Silkwood's body was within legal standards. The defense later proposed that Silkwood was a troublemaker who might have poisoned herself. After the summation arguments, Judge Frank Theis told the jury, "[I]f you find that the damage to the person or property of Karen Silkwood resulted from the operation of this plant ... defendant Kerr-McGee Nuclear Corporation is liable."

The jury rendered its verdict of US$505,000 in damages and US$10,000,000 in punitive damages. On appeal in federal court, the judgment was reduced to US$5,000 (the estimated value of Silkwood's losses in property at her rental house), and the award for punitive damages was reversed. In Silkwood v. Kerr-McGee Corp. 464 US 238 (1984), the U.S. Supreme Court reinstated the original jury verdict. The court ruled that "the NRC's exclusive authority to set safety standards did not foreclose the use of state tort remedies." Although indicating it would appeal for other reasons, Kerr-McGee agreed in 1986 to settle out of court for US$1.38 million ($4.05 million today), while admitting no liability.

== In the media ==
- The 1979 movie The China Syndrome includes a scene that echoes the Silkwood story: a courier, with evidence of falsified radiographs from a nuclear power plant, is rammed from behind and forced off the road while driving to a nuclear safety and plant licensing hearing. Unlike Silkwood, the courier does not die in the crash, but the radiographs are stolen from his car.
- Silkwood was portrayed on stage by actress Jehane Dyllan in the one-person play Silkwood, which Dyllan wrote along with Susan Holleran and Bobbi Ausubel. Ausubel also directed the piece. It ran April 7–12, 1981 at Theater Works, UMass-Park Square in Boston.
- The original screenplay for the 1983 movie Silkwood was written by Nora Ephron and Alice Arlen and is an account of Silkwood's life and the events resulting from her activism. Meryl Streep played the title role and was nominated for an Academy Award and a BAFTA. Cher played Dolly Pelliker, a character based on Karen's friend and roommate Sherri Ellis, and was nominated for a Best Supporting Actress Academy Award. Mike Nichols was nominated for Best Director. Ephron and Arlen were nominated for Best Screenplay Written Directly for the Screen.
- The 2012 movie Cloud Atlas contains a plotline which echoes the Silkwood case: a journalist and a whistleblower investigating a nuclear power plant for malfeasance, end up rammed off of a lonely highway bridge by a suspicious car, and assassinated in a hotel room by a mysterious agent, respectively.
- PBS Frontline produced the program Nuclear Reaction, which contained aspects of the Silkwood story. The program's website includes supplementary text about her that was first printed on November 23, 1995 in Los Alamos Science. The program covered the risks of nuclear energy and raised questions about corporate accountability and responsibility.

== See also ==
- The Christic Institute
- Clarence Lushbaugh
- Hilda Murrell
- Juanita Nielsen
- List of nuclear whistleblowers
- List of unsolved deaths
- Nuclear accidents
- Nuclear fuel
- Nuclear power
- Nuclear safety
- Whistleblowers
