= Kerr-McGee =

American energy company (1929–2006)

- Kerr-McGee Corporation logo
- Formerly: Anderson & Kerr Drilling; Kerlyn Oil Co.; Kerr-McGee Oil Industries Inc.
- Industry: Energy
- Founded: 1929; 97 years ago in Oklahoma, United States
- Founder: Robert S. Kerr
- Defunct: 2006; 20 years ago
- Fate: Acquired by Anadarko Petroleum
- Headquarters: Oklahoma City, Oklahoma, United States

Logo variant.

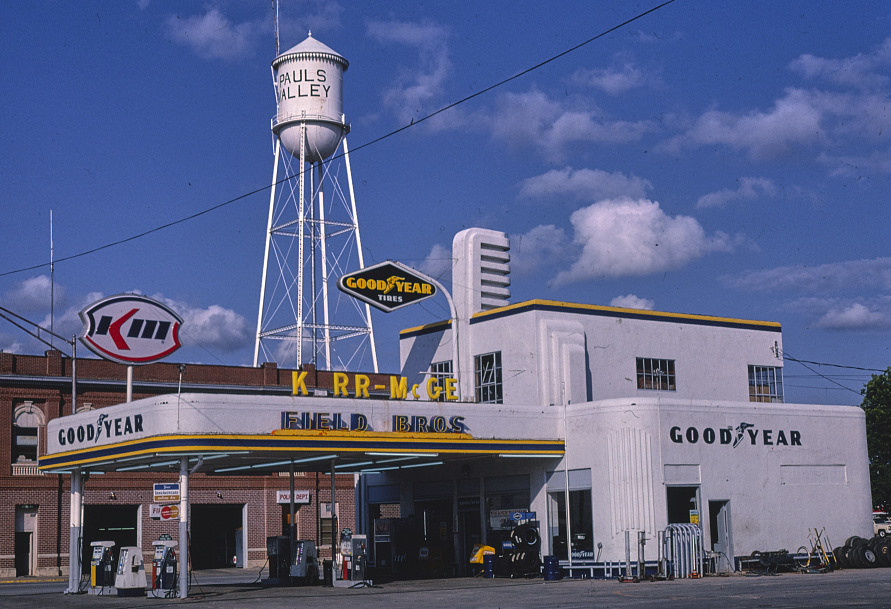
Kerr-McGee Service Station in Pauls Valley, Oklahoma, 1982

The Kerr-McGee Corporation, founded in 1929, was an American energy company involved in oil exploration, production of crude oil, natural gas, perchlorate and uranium mining and milling in various countries. On June 23, 2006, Anadarko Petroleum acquired Kerr-McGee in an all-cash transaction totalling $16.5 billion plus $2.6 billion in debt and all operations moved from their base in Oklahoma, United States. As a result of further acquisitions, most of the former Kerr-McGee is now part of Occidental Petroleum.

== History ==
The company later known as Kerr-McGee was founded in 1929 as Anderson & Kerr Drilling Company by Oklahoma businessman-politician Robert S. Kerr and oil driller James L. Anderson. When Dean A. McGee, a former chief geologist for Phillips Petroleum, joined the firm in 1946, it changed its name to Kerr-McGee Oil Industries, Incorporated. The company initially focused mostly on off-shore oil exploration and production, being one of the first companies to use drillships in the Gulf of Mexico, and later one of the first companies to use a Spar platform in the area.

With the acquisition of the Oryx Energy Company of Dallas, Texas in 1999, Kerr-McGee gained more onshore assets, as well as significant assets in several foreign areas in Algeria and western Kazakhstan. Later acquisitions of HS Resources and Westport Resources Corp. established the base of operations in Denver, Colorado and added large resource areas throughout the Rocky Mountains.

Until 2005, Kerr-McGee had two major divisions: chemical and oil-related. On November 21, 2005, its chemical division, based in Oklahoma City, was sold as an IPO, Tronox, thereby making Oklahoma City home to the administrative side of Kerr-McGee, while exploration and production management was located in Denver and Houston. Through acquisitions, for a time Kerr-McGee marketed products under the Deep Rock, Coast, Power, and Peoples brands in addition to its own. It also marketed Blue Velvet motor oil, a multiviscosity grade with a blue dyed anti-wear additive.

On June 23, 2006, Anadarko Petroleum, based in The Woodlands, Texas, purchased Kerr-McGee in an all-cash transaction totaling $16.5 billion plus the assumption of $2.6 billion in debt. Kerr-McGee shareholders approved the offer on August 10, 2006, and Kerr-McGee ceased to exist independently. All operations with the exception of Tronox, which had been spun off in 2005, moved out of Oklahoma. Within a few years, the top positions at Anadarko had been filled by Kerr-McGee employees and many longtime Anadarko employees had left or been removed from the company, making the merger between Anadarko and Kerr-McGee a "wag the dog" transaction.

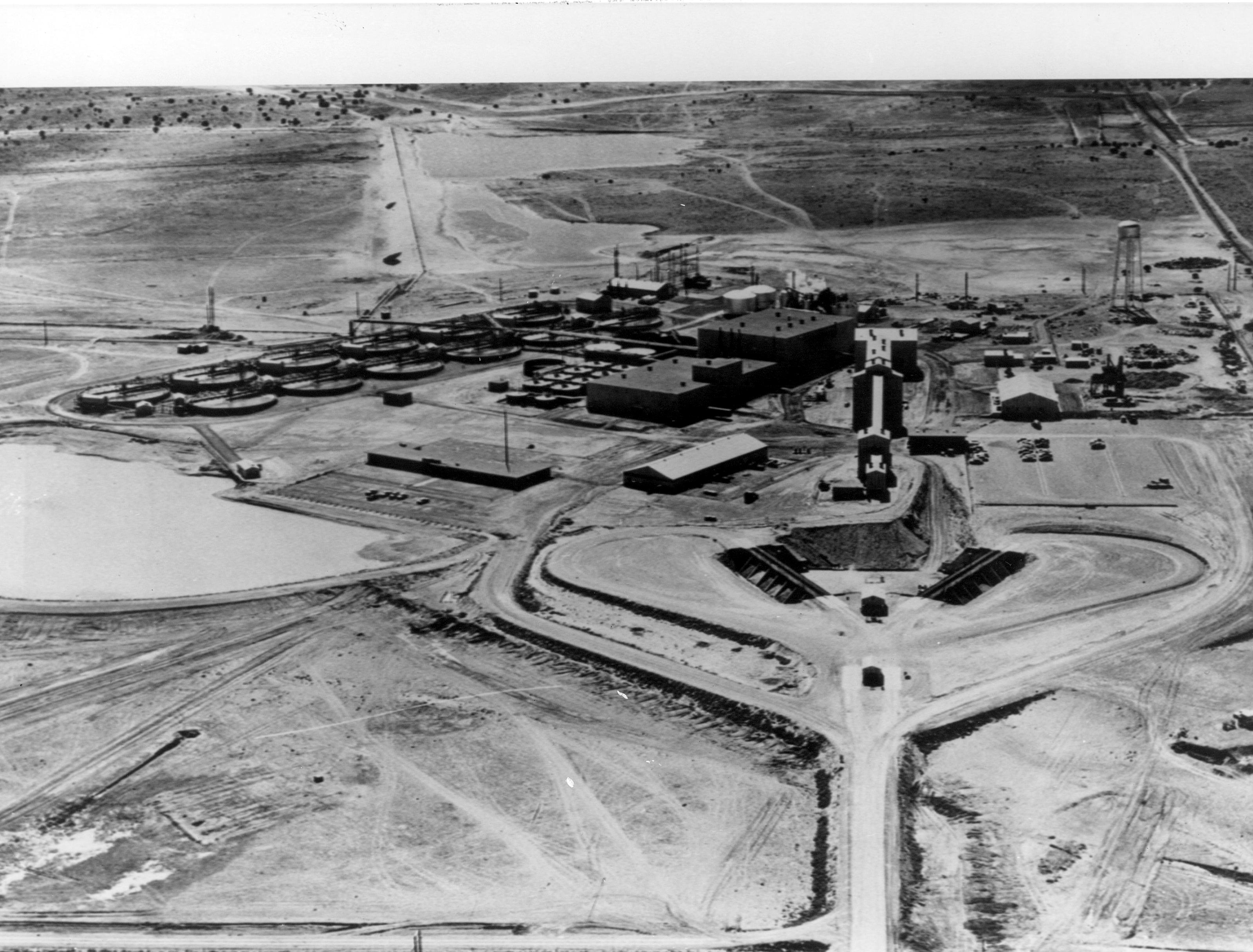
Kerr McGee uranium mill near Grants, New Mexico.

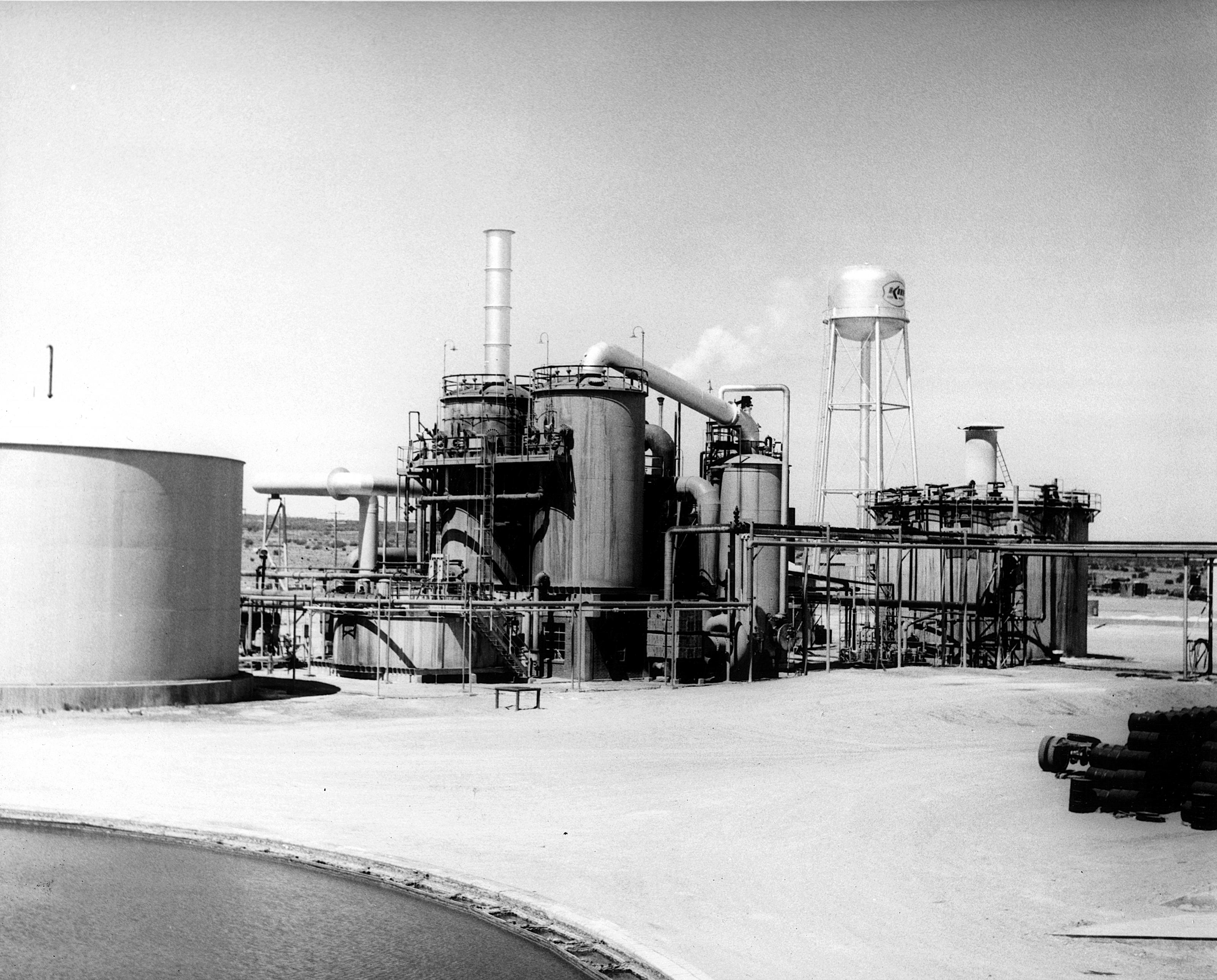
Sulfuric acid plant at Kerr McGee uranium mill.

=== Kerr-McGee Corp. v. Navajo Tribe ===
Kerr-McGee v. Navajo Tribe, 471 U.S. 195 (1985), was a case in which the Supreme Court of the United States held that an Indian tribe is not required to obtain the Secretary of the Interior's approval to impose taxes on non-tribal persons or entities doing business on a reservation.

In 1978, the Navajo Tribal Council passed two tax ordinances. One was a tax of 3% on leaseholds (such as mineral rights) and one a 5% tax on business activity.

Kerr-McGee held substantial mineral rights on the Navajo Nation and filed suit in federal district court seeking an injunction to prohibit the tribe from collecting the tax. Kerr-McGee argued that any tax of non-Indians by a tribe required the Secretary of the Interior's approval, and the district court agreed, granting the injunction. The tribe appealed to the Ninth Circuit Court of Appeals. The Ninth Circuit overruled the district court, finding no federal statute or regulation required such approval. Kerr-McGee then appealed to the Supreme Court, which granted certiorari and agreed to hear the case. The court decided unanimously that the Navajo Nation had the right to tax Kerr-McGee because tribal authority to tax had already been recognized and because no federal law prohibited exercising tribal sovereignty in enacting a tax.

== Locations ==
=== United States ===
Main oil and gas operations in the US were the Mid-Continent, Rocky Mountains, onshore Louisiana, and offshore in the Gulf of Mexico. Main offices were in downtown Denver and the Greenspoint area of Houston.

Corporate headquarters were in Downtown Oklahoma City. In the 1970s the company had a forest products division, and mineral mining in New Mexico, Arizona, and Idaho, and coal mining in Wyoming and Illinois. Most of the U.S operations were on land owned by the U.S. government (i.e. Bureau of Land Management, National Forest) and the Navajo Indian tribe. Kerr-McGee owned a potash operation in California from 1974 to 1990.

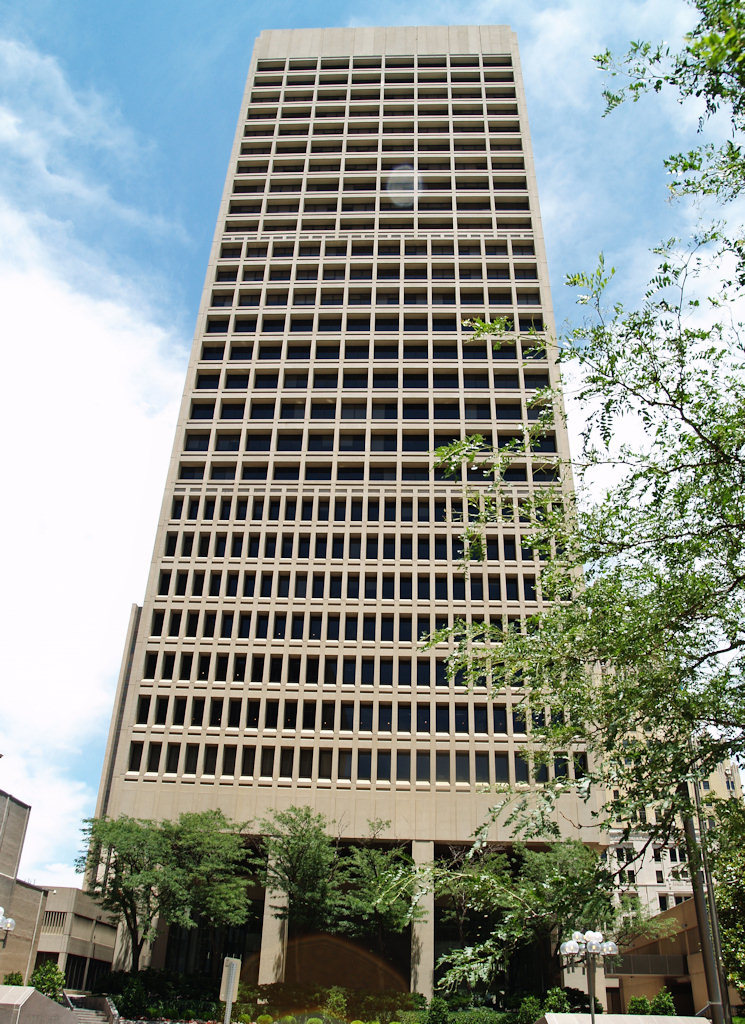
Kerr-McGee Tower, a prominent skyscraper in downtown Oklahoma City, served as Corporate Headquarters.

=== Mainland China ===
Kerr-McGee had exploration, development, and production projects in Bohai Bay, China, near Beijing. Additional exploration was planned for the South China Sea. These operations were run primarily from an office in Beijing.

=== Other locations ===
Kerr-McGee and its subsidiaries formerly operated in western Kazakhstan, western Australia, Brazil, Trinidad, Benin, the United Kingdom and several other more minor locations around the world at various times.

== Controversies ==
=== Exploration in disputed regions of Western Sahara ===
Kerr-McGee received international criticism for undertaking exploration for hydrocarbon resources offshore the Moroccan controlled area of the disputed territory of Western Sahara in 2001. In 2003, one of Norway's main private investment funds, Skagen Vekst, sold its €3.6 million stake in the oil company, referring to ethical problems surrounding Kerr-McGee's engagement in Western Sahara. In May 2005, despite the growing number of protests, the company renewed the contract with Moroccan authorities until October. In June 2005, the Norwegian government sold the $52.7 million it had invested in the company through the Government Petroleum Fund (one of the world's biggest investment funds), saying Kerr-McGee's contract in Western Sahara had "particularly serious violations of fundamental ethical norms". That same month, another two Norwegian private investment funds (Storebrand and KLP) sold their participations on Kerr-McGee, €1 million and €1.45 million respectively. On May 2, 2006, the company declared its intention to no longer drill off the coast of the Western Sahara by not renewing the contract with Morocco.

=== Under-payment of royalties to the U.S. government ===
On June 14, 2004, Bobby Maxwell, a senior government auditor for the U.S. Department of the Interior's Minerals Management Service ("MMS"), filed suit in federal court on behalf of the U.S. Government against Kerr-McGee, under the whistle-blowing provisions of the False Claims Act ("FCA"). In the suit, Maxwell alleged that, based on the information uncovered during his audit, "Kerr-McGee knowingly made false and/or fraudulent statements on the monthly royalty reports submitted to the MMS and 'understated and underpaid' its federal royalties." In January 2007, after a full trial on the issues, a jury found Kerr-McGee was to have failed to report earnings and thus underpaid royalties due to the U.S. government. The jury awarded $7.6 million in damages. But despite the jury's verdict, before entering judgment the court reconsidered an earlier Motion for Summary Judgment Kerr-McGee had filed and reversed its prior holding, this time determining that the court lacked subject matter jurisdiction to hear the case at all. Maxwell appealed, and on September 10, 2008, the 10th Circuit Court of Appeals reversed the lower court ruling, remanding it for further proceedings. On September 16, 2010, U.S. District Court Judge Marcia S. Krieger ordered Kerr-McGee to pay treble damages, or almost $23 million. As a whistle-blower under the FCA, Maxwell was entitled to 25% of the amount recovered for the government, or approximately $5.7 million. But he said most of the money would go to pay the legal fees associated with his almost-10-year fight to force Kerr-McGee to change its deceptive practices and pay the public what it owed.

=== Karen Silkwood ===
It is alleged that Karen Silkwood was negligently or purposefully contaminated with plutonium while working at Kerr-McGee's Cimarron Fuel Fabrication Site and investigating safety violations at the plant. Her activism and November 1974 death were the subject of the 1983 film Silkwood. In a civil suit against Kerr-McGee by the Estate of Karen Silkwood, Judge Frank Theis told the jury, "If you find that the damage to the person or property of Karen Silkwood resulted from the operation of this plant, Kerr-McGee is liable."

The jury rendered its verdict of $505,000 in damages and $10,000,000 in punitive damages. On appeal, the judgment was reduced to $5,000. In 1984, the U.S. Supreme Court restored the original verdict (Silkwood v. Kerr-McGee Corp., 464 U.S. 283 (1984)). The suit was headed for retrial when Kerr-McGee settled out of court in 1986 for $1.38 million, admitting no liability. Gerry Spence, the noted trial lawyer from Jackson Hole, Wyoming, represented the Silkwood estate in this litigation.

== Environmental record ==
Kerr-McGee is at least partially responsible for large scale perchlorate water contamination first discovered in the Lower Colorado River in 1997; It stemmed from land used by a facility in Henderson, Nevada owned and operated by Kerr-McGee Chemical LLC (as of 2011 Tronox LLC), where perchlorate was produced from 1945 until 1998.

In May 2007, Kerr-McGee Corp spent $18 million on pollution controls in the first comprehensive settlement under the Clean Air Act that reduced harmful emission and conserved natural gas at production facilities across Utah and Colorado. The settlement addressed violations discovered at several of Kerr-McGee's natural gas compressor stations on the Uintah and Ouray Indian Reservation near Vernal, Utah, and in the Denver Julesburg Basin near Weld County, Colorado. In addition to implementing pollution controls, the agreement required Kerr-McGee to pay a $200,000 penalty and spend $250,000 on environmental projects to benefit the areas where violations occurred. In July 2005, the United States Environmental Protection Agency (EPA) reached a settlement with Kerr McGee Chemical that required the company to pay $55,392 to resolve air permitting violations at its facility that began in 1993. The EPA cited Kerr-McGee for failing to install carbon monoxide emissions controls required under the Clean Air Act when it installed a new open hearth furnace in 1993. The company spent $4.8 million to install proper pollution controls at the facility reducing total carbon monoxide emission by 115 tons per year, an 80% reduction from previous levels.

In a 2014 landmark legal case, Anadarko was ordered to pay between $5.1 billion and $14.1 billion for environmental liabilities resulting from Kerr-McGee's fraudulent asset transfers in 2005, which left the company’s toxic contamination cleanup responsibilities unresolved. This ruling, one of the largest in U.S. bankruptcy and environmental enforcement history, mandated the company to fund extensive environmental remediation efforts across multiple contaminated sites in the U.S.

== Nuclear production ==
Kerr-McGee was involved in several nuclear endeavors.

In 1952 Kerr-McGee bought the Navajo Uranium Mining Company, including an interest in a number of mines. It also bought an ore buying station at Shiprock, New Mexico. In 1953 it built a processing plant (called the Shiprock Mill) near the buying station. In 1963 the mines and mill were sold to the Vanadium Corporation of America.

Later a partnership with other companies was formed called the Kermac Nuclear Fuels Corporation. In 1957-58 this partnership built a uranium mill near Grants, New Mexico and Ambrosia Lake. In 1983 the mill was taken over by a new Kerr-McGee subsidiary called the Quivira Mining Corporation. Quivira was sold to Rio Algom in 1989.

Kerr-McGee purchased the Lakeview Mining Company of Lake County, Oregon in 1961. The plant was shut down in late 1960 or 1961 and sold to Atlantic Richfield in 1968.

From about 1962 to 1966, Kerr-McGee processed uranium at its oil refinery site in Cushing, Oklahoma. It received licenses in 1962 for processing uranium and thorium, and in 1963 for enriched uranium. In 1966 it stopped production. An attempt was made to move all regulated nuclear material to the company's new Cimarron facility at Crescent, Oklahoma. Cleanups were attempted in 1966, 1972, 1979–82, and the 1990s

Around 1965 Kerr-McGee started producing uranium fuel at its Cimarron Fuel Fabrication Site. This was near the Cimarron River and Crescent, Oklahoma. From 1973 to 1975 it also produced mixed Plutonium-Uranium Oxide (MOX) 'driver fuel pins' for use in the Fast Flux Test Facility at the Hanford Site in Washington State. The plant shut down in 1976.

In 1967 Kerr-McGee bought the American Potash and Chemical Company, which owned the Rare Earths Facility in West Chicago, Illinois. This facility produced thorium, radium, and uranium by acid leaching of monazite sands and other ores. It stopped work in 1973.

In 1968 the company started construction on what became the Sequoyah Fuels Corporation plant in Gore, Oklahoma. In 1970 the plant started turning yellowcake uranium into uranium hexafluoride. In 1987 it began producing depleted uranium tetrafluoride using depleted uranium hexafluoride as input. In 1988 SFC was sold to General Atomics. In late November 1993 production ceased after a valve in the processing plant stuck open and caused an uncontrolled reaction. The uncontrolled reaction resulted in a large visible cloud leaving the plant. Production ceased immediately and the plant operations never resumed.

=== Nuclear corporations, subsidiaries, and spinoffs ===
In 1956 Kerr-McGee formed the Kermac Nuclear Fuels Corporation in partnership with Anderson Development Corp and Pacific Uranium Mines Co. It was active in New Mexico.

Sometime in the 1970s, the Kerr-McGee Nuclear Corporation formed. In 1983 it split into the Quivira Mining Corporation and Sequoyah Fuels Corporation. Quivira got the Ambrosia Lake mine, while Sequoyah Fuels took over the Sequoyah plant in Gore as well as the Cimarron plant in Crescent. Sequoyah was sold to General Atomics in 1988 and Quivira was sold to Rio Algom in 1989.

The Cimarron Corporation was a subdivision that took control of the Cimarron plant in 1988. When Tronox was spun off in 2006, it got ownership of Cimarron Corporation and responsibility for the plant.

Kerr-McGee bought the American Potash and Chemical Company in 1967, including its Rare Earths Facility that processed uranium and thorium. AMPOT became Kerr-McGee Chemical Company around 1970 or 1974. In 2005 this became Tronox. Tronox became independent in 2006, a few months before Kerr-McGee was sold to Anadarko Petroleum. Tronox later went bankrupt, blaming in part the environmental liabilities inherited from KMC. In 2009 purchasers of Tronox filed a class action lawsuit against Anadarko for having allegedly misled investors.

=== Licenses ===
In the US, nuclear companies must get licenses from the Nuclear Regulatory Commission. Kerr-McGee licenses follow:

- SNM-928 - Cimarron - uranium fuel fabrication
- SNM-1174 - Cimarron - mixed oxide fuel (MOX) fabrication - ?-1993
- STA-583 - Rare Earths Facility
- SMB-664 - Cushing refinery - uranium and thorium. 1962-1966
- SNM-695 - Cushing refinery - enriched uranium. 1963-1966
- SNM-1999 - Cushing refinery - cleanup. 1993-2006
- SUB-1010 - Sequoyah
- SUA-1473 - Ambrosia Lake source materials license (currently managed by BHP)
