= Depleted uranium hexafluoride =

Byproduct of uranium enrichment

Depleted uranium hexafluoride (DUHF; also referred to as depleted uranium tails, depleted uranium tailings or DUF_{6}) is a byproduct of the processing of uranium hexafluoride into enriched uranium. It is one of the chemical forms of depleted uranium (up to 73-75%), along with depleted triuranium octoxide (up to 25%) and depleted uranium metal (up to 2%). DUHF is 1.7 times less radioactive than uranium hexafluoride and natural uranium.

== History ==
The concept of depleted and enriched uranium emerged nearly 150 years after the discovery of uranium by Martin Klaproth in 1789. In 1938, two German physicists Otto Hahn and Fritz Strassmann had made the discovery of the fission of the atomic nucleus of the ^{235}U isotope, which was theoretically substantiated by Lise Meitner, Otto Robert Frisch and in parallel with them Gottfried von Droste and Siegfried Flügge. This discovery marked the beginning of the peaceful and military use of the nuclear energy of uranium. A year later, Yulii Khariton and Yakov Zeldovich were the first to prove theoretically that with an enrichment of ^{235}U in natural uranium, a chain reaction could be sustained. This nuclear chain reaction requires on average that at least one neutron, released by the fission of an atom of ^{235}U, will be captured by another atom of ^{235}U and will cause it also to fission. The probability of a neutron being captured by a fissile nucleus should be high enough to sustain the reaction. To increase this probability, an increase in the proportion of ^{235}U is necessary, which in natural uranium constitutes only 0.72%, along with 99.27% ^{238}U and 0.0055% ^{234}U.

=== Competition ===
By the mid-1960s, the United States had a monopoly on the supply of uranium fuel for Western nuclear power plants. In 1968, the USSR declared its readiness to accept orders for uranium enrichment. As a result, a competitive market formed in the world, and commercial enrichment companies began to appear (e.g., URENCO and Eurodif). In 1971, the first Soviet contract was signed with the French Alternative Energies and Atomic Energy Commission, where nuclear power plants were actively built. In 1973, roughly 10 long-term contracts were signed with power companies from Italy, Germany, Great Britain, Spain, Sweden, Finland, Belgium and Switzerland. By 2017, large commercial enrichment plants have been operating in France, Germany, the Netherlands, Great Britain, the United States, Russia and China. The development of the enrichment market has led to the accumulation of over 2 million tons of DUHF in the world during this period.

=== Other forms of depleted uranium ===
Depleted uranium may exist in several chemical forms; in the form of DUHF, the most common form, with a density of 5.09 g/cm^{3}, in the form of depleted triuranium octoxide (U_{3}O_{8}) with a density of 8.38 g/cm^{3}, and in the form of depleted uranium metal with a density of 19.01 g/cm^{3}.

== Physical properties ==
Since the various uranium isotopes share the same chemical properties, the chemical and physical properties of depleted, enriched, and unenriched UF_{6} are identical, except for the degree of radioactivity. Like other forms of UF_{6}, under standard conditions, DUHF forms white crystals, with a density of 5.09 g/cm^{3}. At pressures below 1.5 atm, the solid DUHF sublimes into gas when heated, with no liquid form. At 1 atm, the sublimation point is 56.5 °C. The critical temperature of DUHF is 230.2 °C, and the critical pressure is 4.61 MPa.

== Radioactivity ==
The radioactivity of DUHF is determined by the isotopic composition of uranium because the fluorine in the compound is stable. The radioactive decay rate of natural UF_{6} (with 0.72% ^{235}U) is 1.7×10^{4} Bq/g of which 97.6% is due to ^{238}U and ^{234}U.

Properties and contribution to the radioactivity of natural uranium of its isotopes
Uranium isotope	Mass fraction in natural uranium	Half-life, years	Activity of 1 mg of pure isotope	Contribution to the activity of natural uranium
^{238}U	99.27%	4.51 billion	12.4 Bq	48.8%
^{235}U	0.72%	704 million	80 Bq	2.4%
^{234}U	0.0055%	245,000	231000 Bq	48.8%

When uranium is enriched, the content of light isotopes, ^{234}U and ^{235}U, increases. Although ^{234}U, despite its much lower mass fraction, contributes more to the activity, the target isotope for nuclear industry use is ^{235}U. Therefore, the degree of uranium enrichment or depletion is specified by the content of ^{235}U. The reduction of ^{234}U, and to a slight degree ^{235}U, content reduces the radioactivity below unenriched UF_{6}.

Radioactive decay rates of natural and depleted uranium hexafluoride depending on the level of enrichment
Type of uranium hexafluoride	Degree of ^{235}U content	Radioactive decay rate, Bq/g (Note: This specific activity includes the activity of uranium-234 which is concentrated during the enrichment process, and does not include activity of daughter products.)	Activity with respect to natural uranium hexafluoride
Natural (with natural composition of uranium isotopes)	0.72%	1.7×10^{4}	100%
Depleted	0.45%	1.2×10^{4}	70%

== Production ==
Illustration of the uranium hexafluoride enrichment process

Low enriched uranium with enrichment of 2 to 5% ^{235}U (with some exceptions when using 0.72% in natural composition, for example in Canadian CANDU reactors) is used for nuclear power, in contrast to weapons-grade highly enriched uranium with ^{235}U content of over 20% and usually over 90%. Various methods of isotope separation are used to produce enriched uranium, mainly gas centrifugation and, in the past, the gaseous diffusion method. Most of them work with gaseous UF_{6}, which in turn is produced by fluorination of elemental uranium tetrafluoride (UF_{4} + F_{2} → UF_{6}) or uranium oxides (UO_{2}F_{2} + 2 F_{2} → UF_{6} + O_{2}), both highly exothermic.

Since UF_{6} is the only uranium compound that is gaseous at a relatively low temperature, it plays a key role in the nuclear fuel cycle as a substance suitable for separating ^{235}U and ^{238}U. After obtaining enriched UF_{6}, the remainder (approximately 95% of the total mass) is transformed into depleted UF_{6} , which consists mainly of ^{238}U, because its ^{235}U content is reduced by perhaps a factor of three, and its ^{234}U content by a factor of six (depending on the degree of depletion). In 2020, nearly two million tons of depleted uranium was accumulated in the world. Most of it is stored in the form of DUHF in special steel tanks.

The methods of handling depleted uranium in different countries depends on their nuclear fuel cycle strategy. The International Atomic Energy Agency (IAEA) recognizes that policy determination is the prerogative of the government (para. VII of the Joint Convention on the Safety of Spent Fuel Management and on the Safety of Radioactive Waste Management). Given the technological capabilities and concepts of the nuclear fuel cycle in each country, with access to separation facilities, DUHF may be considered as a valuable raw material on one hand or low-level radioactive waste on the other. Therefore, there is no unified legal and regulatory status for DUHF in the world. The IAEA expert report ISBN 92-64-195254, 2001 and the joint report of the OECD, NEA and IAEA Management of Depleted Uranium, 2001 recognize DUHF as a valuable raw material.

Accumulated DUHF in 2014 by country
Separation plants, country	Accumulated DUHF (thousand tons)	Annual increase in DUHF reserves (thousand tons)	Form of storage of depleted uranium (DUHF, oxide, metal)
USEC / DOE (USA)	700	30	UF_{6}
ROSATOM (Russia)	640	15	UF_{6}
EURODIF (France)	200	18	UF_{6}, U_{3}O_{8}
BNFL (Great Britain)	44	0	UF_{6}
URENCO (Germany, the Netherlands, England)	43	6	UF_{6}
JNFL, PNC (Japan)	38	0.7	UF_{6}
CNNC (China)	30	1.5	UF_{6}
SA NEC (South Africa)	3	0	UF_{6}
Others (South America)	<1.5	0	-
Total	≈ 1700	≈ 70	UF_{6}, (U_{3}O_{8})

== Applications ==
As a result of chemical conversion of DUHF, anhydrous hydrogen fluoride and/or its aqueous solution (i.e. hydrofluoric acid) are obtained, which have a certain demand in non-nuclear energy markets, such as the aluminum industry, in production of refrigerants, herbicides, pharmaceuticals, high-octane gasoline, plastics, etc. It is also applied in the reuse of hydrogen fluoride in the production of UF_{6} via the conversion of U_{3}O_{8} into uranium tetrafluoride (UF_{4}), before further fluorination into UF_{6}.

== Processing ==
There are multiple directions in the world practice of DUHF reprocessing. Some of them have been tested in a semi-industrial setting, while others have been and are being operated on an industrial scale with an effort to reduce the reserves of uranium tailings and provide the chemical industry with hydrofluoric acid and industrial organofluorine products.

Processing methods of depleted uranium hexafluoride
Method	Reaction	Final product
Pyrohydrolysis	UF_{6} + H_{2}O → UO_{2}F_{2} + 4 HF 3 UO_{2}F_{2} + 3 H_{2}O → U_{3}O_{8} + 6 HF + ½ O_{2}	Triuranium octoxide and hydrofluoric acid (20 -f 50% HF)
Pyrohydrolysis in a fluidized bed (on UO_{2} pellets)		Uranium dioxide (granular) density up to 6 g/cm3 and hydrofluoric acid (up to 90% HF)
Hydrogen recovery	UF_{6} + H_{2} → UF_{4} + 2 HF	Uranium tetrafluoride and hydrogen fluoride
Recovery via organic compounds (CHCI)	UF_{6} + CHCI = CCI_{2} → UF_{4} + CHCIF - CCI_{2}F	Uranium tetrafluoride, refrigerants, including ozone-safe (X-122)
Recovery via organic compounds (ССI_{4})	UF_{6} + CCI_{4} → UF_{4} + CF_{2}CI_{2} + CI_{2}	Uranium tetrafluoride and methane-type refrigerants
Plasma-chemical conversion	UF_{6} + 3 H - OH → 1/3 U_{3}O_{8} + 6 HF + 1/6 O_{2}	Triuranium octoxide (density 4.5-4.7 g/cm3) and hydrogen fluoride
Radiation-chemical recovery UF_{6}	UF_{6} + 2 e → UF_{4} + 2 F	Uranium tetrafluoride and fluorine.

Depending on nuclear fuel cycle strategy, technological capabilities, international conventions and programs, such as the Sustainable Development Goals (SDG) and the UN Global Compact, each country approaches the issue of the use of accumulated depleted uranium individually. The United States has adopted a number of long-term programs for the safe storage and reprocessing of DUHF stocks prior to their final disposal.

=== Sustainable development goals ===
Under the UN SDG, nuclear power plays a significant role not only in providing access to affordable, reliable, sustainable and modern energy (Goal 7), but also in contributing to other goals, including supporting poverty, hunger and water scarcity elimination, economic growth and industry innovation. Several countries, such as the United States, France, Russia, and China, through their leading nuclear power operators, have committed to achieving the Sustainable Development Goals. To achieve these goals, various technologies are being applied both in the reprocessing of spent fuel and in the reprocessing of accumulated DUHF.

== Transportation ==
International policies for transporting radioactive materials are regulated by the IAEA since 1961. These regulations are implemented in the policies of the International Civil Aviation Organization, International Maritime Organization, and regional transport organizations.

Depleted UF_{6} is transported and stored under standard conditions in solid form and in sealed metal containers with wall thickness of about 1 cm (0.39 in), designed for extreme mechanical and corrosive impacts. For example, the most common "48Y" containers for transportation and storage contain up to 12.5 tons of DUHF in solid form. DUHF is loaded and unloaded from these containers under factory conditions when heated, in liquid form and via special autoclaves.

== Dangers ==
Due to its low radioactivity, the main health hazards of DUHF are connected to its chemical effects on bodily functions. Chemical exposure is a major hazard at facilities associated with the processing of DUHF. Uranium and fluoride compounds such as hydrogen fluoride (HF) are toxic at low levels of chemical exposure. When DUHF comes in contact with air moisture, it reacts to form HF and gaseous uranyl fluoride. HF is a corrosive acid that can be extremely dangerous if inhaled; it is one of the major work hazards in such industries.

In many countries, current occupational exposure limits for soluble uranium compounds are related to a maximum concentration of 3 μg of uranium per gram of kidney tissue. Any effects caused by exposure to these levels on the kidneys are considered minor and temporary. Current practices based on these limits provide adequate protection for workers in the uranium industry. To ensure that these kidney concentrations are not exceeded, legislation limits long-term (8 hours) concentrations of soluble uranium in workplace air to 0.2 mg per cubic meter and short-term (15 minutes) to 0.6 mg per cubic meter

=== Incidents during transportation ===
In August 1984, the freighter MS Mont Louis sank in the English Channel with 18 containers of slightly depleted (0.67% ^{238}U) uranium hexafluoride on board, along with enriched and natural UF_{6}. The 30 containers (type 48Y) of UF_{6} were recovered, as well as 16 of the 22 empty containers (type 30B). Examination of the 30 containers revealed, in one case, a small leak in the shutoff valve. There were 217 samples taken, subjected to 752 different analyses and 146 measurements of dose levels on the containers. There was no evidence of leakage of either radioactive (natural or recycled uranium) or hazardous chemical substances (fluorine or hydrofluoric acid). According to The Washington Post, this incident was not hazardous because the uranium cargo was in its natural state, with an isotope ^{235}U content of 0.72% or less, and only some of it was enriched to 0.9%.

== See also ==
- Traveling wave reactor - a reactor concept that uses depleted uranium for fuel
