= Joint Convention on the Safety of Spent Fuel Management and on the Safety of Radioactive Waste Management =

1997 international treaty

The Joint Convention on the Safety of Spent Fuel Management and on the Safety of Radioactive Waste Management is a 1997 International Atomic Energy Agency (IAEA) treaty. It is the first treaty to address radioactive waste management on a global scale.

== Content ==
The states that ratify the Convention agree to be governed by the convention's provisions on the storage of nuclear waste, including transport and the location, design, and operation of storage facilities.

The Convention implements meetings of the state parties that review the states' implementation of the convention. The Fourth Review Meeting was held in 2012. A summary report from the meeting, and links to the national reports from the participating countries, is available on the IAEA website.

== Creation and state parties ==
The convention was concluded in Vienna, Austria, on 29 September 1997 and entered into force on 18 June 2001. It was signed by 42 states. As of March 2025, it has 90 state parties plus the European Atomic Energy Community. Lebanon, and the Philippines have signed the convention but have not ratified it.

The following are the parties to the convention. States in bold have at least one nuclear power plant in operation.

- Albania
- **Argentina**
- **Armenia**
- Australia
- Austria
- **Belarus**
- **Belgium**
- Benin
- Bolivia
- Bosnia and Herzegovina
- Botswana
- **Brazil**
- **Bulgaria**
- **Canada**
- Chile
- **China** (extended to Hong Kong)
- Congo
- Croatia
- Cuba
- Cyprus
- **Czech Republic**
- Denmark
- Eritrea
- Estonia
- **Finland**
- **France**
- Gabon
- Georgia
- **Germany**
- Ghana
- Greece
- **Hungary**
- Iceland
- Indonesia
- Iraq
- Ireland
- Italy
- **Japan**
- Jordan
- **Kazakhstan**
- **South Korea**
- Kyrgyzstan
- Latvia
- Lebanon
- Lesotho
- **Lithuania**
- Luxembourg
- Macedonia
- Madagascar
- Malawi
- Malta
- Mauritania
- Mauritius
- **Mexico**
- Moldova
- Montenegro
- Morocco
- **Netherlands**
- Niger
- Nigeria
- Norway
- Oman
- Paraguay
- Peru
- Philippines
- Poland
- Portugal
- **Romania**
- **Russia**
- Rwanda
- Saudi Arabia
- Senegal
- Serbia
- **Slovakia**
- **Slovenia**
- **South Africa**
- **Spain**
- **Sweden**
- **Switzerland**
- Tajikistan
- Thailand
- Turkey
- **Ukraine**
- **United Arab Emirates**
- **United Kingdom**
- **United States**
- Uruguay
- Uzbekistan
- Vietnam
- Zimbabwe
- **(European Union) European Atomic Energy Community**
