= United Western Minerals Company =

- Company type: Mining
- Founded: April 4, 1955 in Delaware
- Founder: Patrick J. Hurley
- Fate: Surrender
- Headquarters: Santa Fe, New Mexico
- Key people: Patrick J. Hurley; Norman Dike; Hobart A. Holt, secretary Alva A. Simpson, Jr., president Leland Thompson Jr., president

The United Western Minerals Company was a company formed to exploit uranium deposits in New Mexico in 1955.

== History ==
In the mid-1950s, the company was involved in uranium exploration in the Ambrosia Lake area of McKinley County, New Mexico. A number of lawsuits were tried regarding ownership of the claims and the ore produced. The company was cited in an undated draft document from the 21st century as being one of several that interfered with the Hozho (a way of life) for the Navajo people.
