= Quivira Mining Corporation =

Defunct mining company

The Quivira Mining Corporation (sometimes spelled Quivera) was a uranium mining company owned by Kerr-McGee. It was established in 1983.

In 1983 Quivira became operator of Kerr-McGee's old 1958 uranium mill at Ambrosia Lake, New Mexico. The mill operated until 2002. From 1966 to 2002, the mill processed uranium ore and recovered mine water from mines in the area. Tailings disposal cells and evaporation ponds constructed in the 1970s, 80s, 90s, and 00s were used for byproduct materials, process water, uranium tailings, and rad waste while maintaining environmental safety and regulatory compliance.

In 1989 Quivira was bought by Rio Algom Mining, which was then bought by Billiton in 2000. Billiton then merged with BHP to form BHP Billiton in 2001. Rio Algom was then bought from BHP Billiton by Uranium Resources in 2007. In June, 2008 Uranium Resources announced it would terminate the agreement to purchase Rio Algom Mining from BHP Billiton.

== See also ==
- Uranium mining in New Mexico
