= Church Rock uranium mill spill =

Radioactive spill in New Mexico, United States

UNC Church Rock
- Superfund site
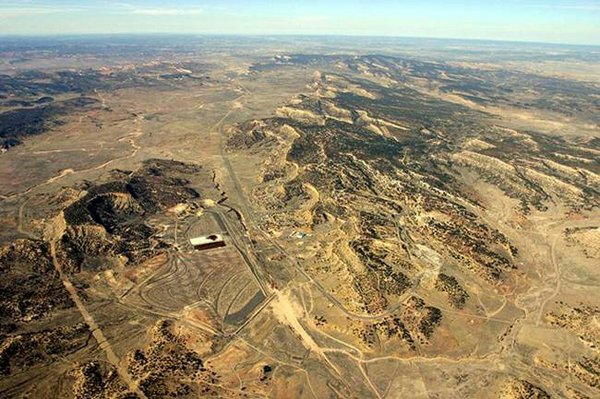
- United Nuclear Corporation Church Rock mill site after clean-up

- Location within New Mexico
- Location: Church Rock, New Mexico, McKinley, New Mexico; 35°39′03″N 108°30′23″W

Information
- CERCLIS ID: NMD030443303
- Contaminants: Metals, radionuclides
- Responsible parties: United Nuclear Corporation

Progress
- Proposed: December 30, 1982
- Listed: August 8, 1983
- Construction completed: August 29, 1998

The Church Rock uranium mill spill occurred in the U.S. state of New Mexico on July 16, 1979, when United Nuclear Corporation's tailings disposal pond at its uranium mill in Church Rock breached its dam. The spill remains the largest release of radioactive material in U.S. history, having released more radioactivity than the Three Mile Island accident four months earlier.

The Church Rock uranium mill, which operated from June 1977 to May 1982, was located on privately owned land about 17 miles (27 km) northeast of Gallup, New Mexico, bordered to the north and southwest by Navajo Nation Tribal Trust lands. The milling of uranium ore there produced an acidic slurry of ground waste rock and fluid (tailings) that was pumped to the tailings disposal area.

The breach released more than 1,100 short tons (1,000 t) of solid radioactive mill waste and 94 million US gallons (360,000 m^{3}) of acidic, radioactive tailings solution into the Puerco River through Pipeline Arroyo. An estimated 1.36 short tons (1.23 t) of uranium and 46 curies of alpha contaminants traveled 80 miles (130 km) downstream to Navajo County, Arizona, and onto the Navajo Nation. In addition to being radioactive and acidic, the spill contained toxic metals and sulfates. The spill contaminated groundwater and rendered the Puerco unusable to local residents, mostly Navajo peoples who used the river's water for drinking, irrigation, and livestock. They were not warned for days of the toxic dangers from the spill.

The governor of New Mexico at the time, Bruce King, refused the Navajo Nation's request that the site be declared a federal disaster area, limiting the aid affected residents could receive. The nuclear contamination event received less media coverage than that of Three Mile Island, possibly because it occurred in a very rural area not served by major media. The spill also happened in Native American country, among a community who did not have their concerns addressed by medical authorities.

In 2003, the Church Rock Chapter of the Navajo Nation began the Church Rock Uranium Monitoring Project to assess environmental impacts of abandoned uranium mines; it found significant radiation from both natural and mining sources in the area. As of 2016, the EPA National Priorities List included the Church Rock tailings storage site, where "groundwater migration is not under control".

== Dam failure ==
At around 5:30 am on July 16, 1979, a previously identified crack opened into a 20-foot-breach (6.1 m) in the south cell of United Nuclear Corporation's Church Rock temporary uranium mill tailings disposal pond, and 1,100 short tons (1,000 t) of solid radioactive mill waste and about 93 million US gallons (350,000 m^{3}) of acidic, radioactive tailings solution flowed into Pipeline Arroyo, a tributary of the Puerco River. Warnings of an impending spill had been ignored by the state and by United Nuclear Corporation. Though the uranium mill only bordered the Navajo Nation, the tailings spilled onto the Navajo Nation as they flowed down the Puerco River.

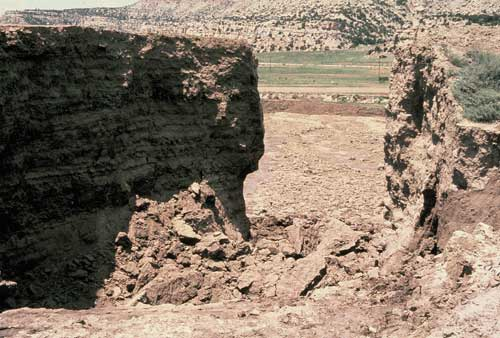
The 20-foot (6.1 m) breach in the tailings dam formed around 5:30 a.m. on July 16, 1979.

The tailings solution had a pH of 1.2 and a gross alpha particle activity of 128 nanocuries (4.7 kBq) per liter. In addition to radioactive uranium, thorium, radium, and polonium, it also contained various other metals, including cadmium, aluminium, magnesium, manganese, molybdenum, nickel, selenium, sodium, vanadium, zinc, iron, and lead, and also high concentrations of sulfates. The contaminated water from the Church Rock spill traveled 80 miles (130 km) downstream, through Gallup, New Mexico, and reached as far as Navajo County, Arizona. The flood backed up sewers, affected nearby aquifers, and left stagnating, contaminated pools on the riverside.

As the highly acidic spill traveled downstream, alkaline soils and clays neutralized the acid and adsorbed many of the contaminants. The contaminated sediments were gradually dispersed by the river and diluted by "clean" sediment. In parts of the river system with higher concentrations of contaminants, yellow salt crystals precipitated onto the arroyo bed. These salts, containing metals and radionuclides, were washed away during subsequent rainstorms. Approximately one month after the spill, the Puerco River had regained normal levels of salinity, acidity, and radioactivity at low flow levels, with contaminants being detectable only after heavy rains. The EPA reported no long-term effects of the spill, but noted that contaminant levels from uranium mine effluents and natural sources were "environmentally significant".

=== Response ===
At 6:00 am, a United Nuclear Corporation employee noticed the breach and suspended further discharge of tailings solution to the holding pond. By 8:00, a temporary dike had stopped the flow of residual tailings solution.

Several days after the spill, the Indian Health Service and the Environmental Improvement Division of New Mexico warned local residents by radio and with signs written in English not to drink from, water livestock at, or enter the Puerco River. However, many Navajo people in the area speak only Diné Bizaad, an Athabaskan language spoken by 150,000 people on the Navajo Nation.

The states of Arizona and New Mexico did not immediately make their residents aware of the dangers of radiation. Not until a few days after the spill were United Nuclear Corporation employees dispatched to warn Navajo-speaking residents downstream in accordance with a state contingency plan. The Navajo Nation asked the New Mexico governor Bruce King to request disaster assistance from the US government and have the site declared a disaster area, but he refused, an action that limited disaster relief assistance to the Navajo Nation.

Although the New Mexico Environmental Improvement Division said the spill's "short-term and long-term impacts on people and the environment were quite limited", ponds of uranium-contaminated water lined the Puerco River and seeped into wells. United Nuclear denied claims that the spill caused livestock deaths, even though harm to the Navajo economy (which was dependent on the sale of mutton) was claimed. The company issued this statement through an attorney: "We just don't know of any substance to those claims. Some people aren't going to be satisfied no matter how thoroughly you show it." Navajo Tribal Council's vice president Frank Paul said of the worst spill in US history: "Somehow, United Nuclear Corporation was permitted to locate a tailings pond and a dam on an unstable geologic formation. Somehow, UNC was allowed to design an unsafe tailings dam not in conformance to its own design criteria. Somehow, UNC was permitted to inadequately deal with warning cracks that had appeared over two years prior to the date the dam failed. Somehow, UNC was permitted to continue a temporary dam for six months beyond its design life. Somehow, UNC was permitted to have a tailings dam without either an adequate contingency plan or sufficient men and material in place to deal with a spill. Somehow, UNC was permitted to deal with the spill by doing almost nothing."

Under the "agreement state" legislative framework of the Uranium Mill Tailings Radiation Control Act, the Nuclear Regulatory Commission left New Mexico to handle the dam failure until October 12, 1979, when it was notified that the state would permit the uranium mill to resume operation that week. The NRC then suspended United Nuclear's operating license until it could be determined that the embankment was stable. After fewer than four months of downtime following the dam failure, the mill resumed operations on November 2, 1979. This resumption further contaminated the groundwater and resulted in the mill site's placement on the EPA's National Priorities List in 1983. United Nuclear made a $525,000 out-of-court settlement with the Navajo Nation a year after the spill.

The spill released more radioactivity than the Three Mile Island accident. The spill has been called "the largest radioactive accident in U.S. history", but the Nuclear Regulatory Commission has said that this is "an overstatement" and that "there have been a number of other events that have been more significant in terms of radiological impact. The event was more significant from an environmental perspective than from a human one." Nevertheless, the incident remains the "largest single release" of radioactive materials into the environment in US history as of March 2025.

== Causes ==
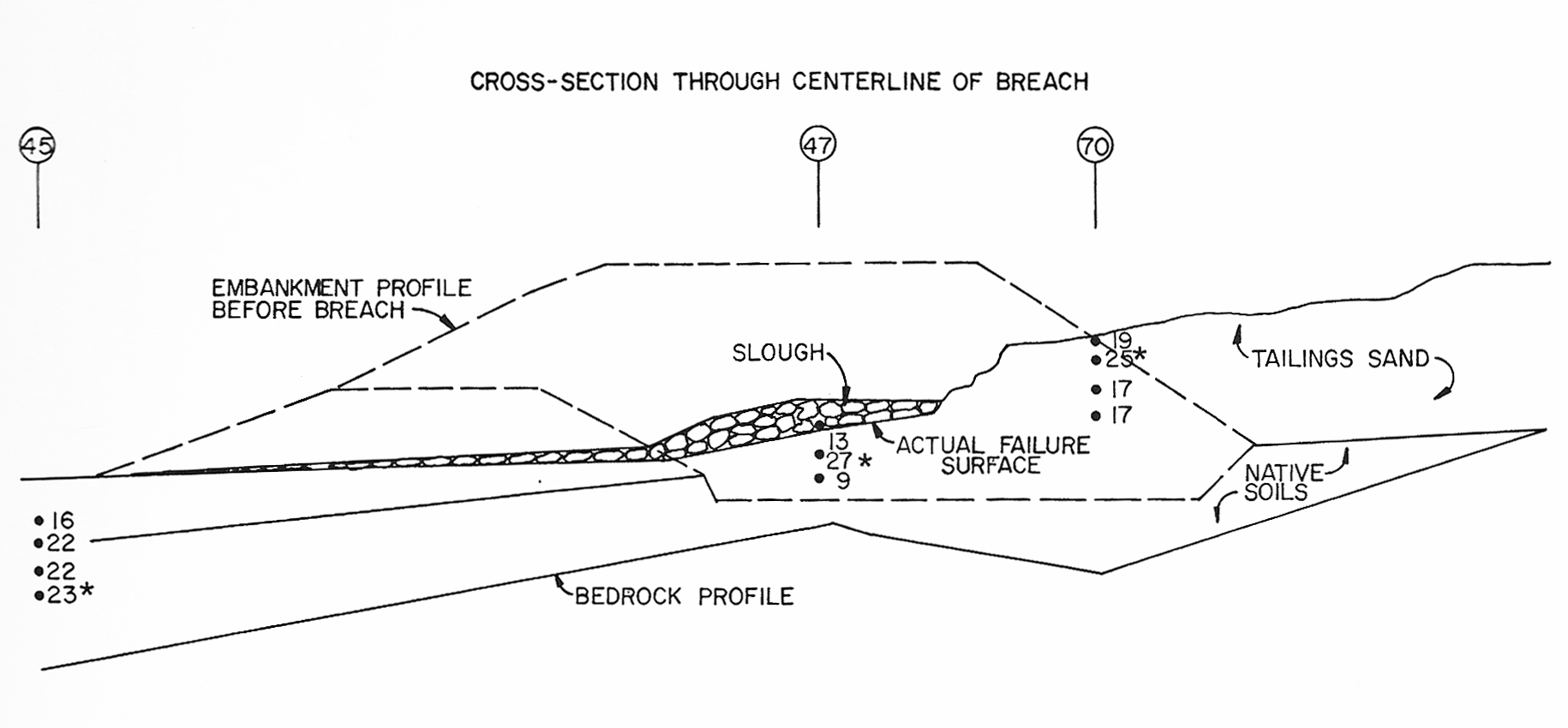
A diagrammed cross section of the breach from the report commissioned by the NRC. The "point" in the bedrock that UNC said acted as a fulcrum in the dam's breach is visible beneath the embankment.

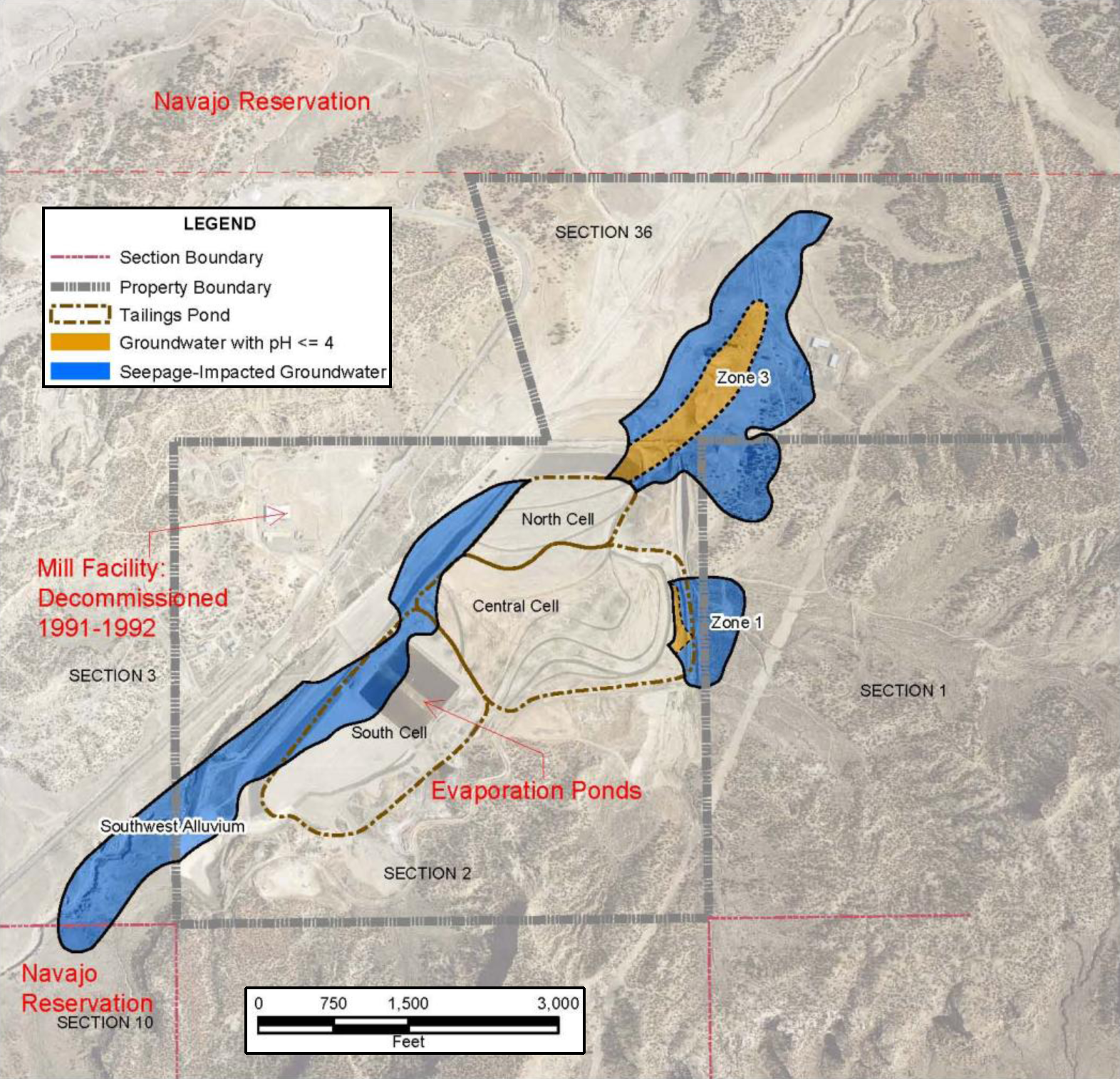
Extent of seepage-impacted groundwater, weakening South Cell wall foundations

The dam formed the southern wall of one of the mill's three holding ponds, which were used to evaporate tailings solution until the remaining solid waste could be buried. From 1967 to 1982, the mill produced an average of 4,000 short tons (3,600 t) of tailings every day, for a total of 3.5 million short tons (3.2 Mt). The 35-foot (11 m) high embankment was constructed on a deposit of collapsible clayey, silty sand, one hundred feet (30 m) deep. United Nuclear used a new design, recommended by the Nuclear Regulatory Commission, that used earth rather than tailings themselves as building material. The holding pond was not lined, a violation of the Uranium Mill Tailings Radiation Control Act of 1978. This allowed tailings solution to seep into the ground, weakening the foundation of the dam and contaminating the groundwater.

Horizontal and vertical cracks formed along the southern part of the embankment, allowing the acidic tailings solution to penetrate and weaken the embankment. A sand beach was constructed to protect the face of the embankment from the tailings solution, but it was not properly maintained. The liquid in the holding pond eventually rose two feet (0.61 m) higher than the dam's designed limit, past the point where the sand beach could protect the dam. The United States Army Corps of Engineers concluded in its report to Governor Bruce King of New Mexico that the principal cause of failure was differential settlement of the foundation beneath the dam wall, and the report commissioned by the Nuclear Regulatory Commission corroborated this conclusion. Critical variations in tailings pond operation practice from approved procedures contributed further to the dam failure. United Nuclear's chief operating officer, J. David Hann, blamed the failure of dam on the pointed shape of the bedrock beneath the embankment, which he said acted as a fulcrum and weakened the dam.

In December 1977, independent consultants spotted cracks in the dam wall. Three months later, United Nuclear sealed the cracks with bentonite and kerosene slurry but took little or no other action, despite the consultant's urging for regular inspections of the dam. Further cracking was noted in October 1978. Neither the facility owner nor the State Engineer were formally notified of the cracks, though Arizona representative Morris K. Udall testified before Congress that at least three federal and state agencies had "ample opportunity" to predict that the dam's failure was likely. At the same Congressional hearing, the United States Army Corps of Engineers testified that had the dam been built according to legal specifications, the failure would not have occurred.

== Effects ==
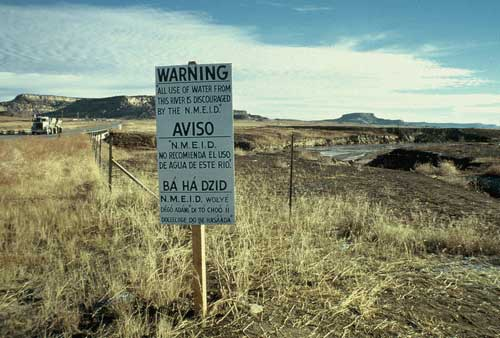
A sign placed by the New Mexico Environmental Improvement Division discouraging use of the Puerco River.

Shortly after the breach, below the dam radioactivity levels of river water were 7000 times that allowable in drinking water. United Nuclear initially claimed that only one curie of radioactivity was released in the spill, but that figure was later revised upward by the New Mexico Environmental Improvement Division. In all, 46 curies (1.7 TBq) of radioactivity were released.

Before the spill, local residents used the riverside for recreation and herb-gathering, and children often waded in the Puerco River. Residents who waded in the river after the spill went to the hospital complaining of burning feet and were misdiagnosed with heat stroke. Burns acquired by some who contacted the contaminated water developed serious infections and required amputations. Herds of sheep and cattle died after drinking the contaminated water, and children played in pools of contaminated water. The spill contaminated shallow aquifers near the river that residents drank and used to water livestock. 1,700 people lost access to clean water after the spill. United Nuclear Corporation distributed 600 gallon-jugs of clean water, but the affected area required more than 30,000 US gallons (110,000 L; 25,000 imp gal) of water daily. The three community wells serving Church Rock had already been closed, one for high radium levels and the others for high levels of iron and bacteria. The Indian Health Service advised the tribe to repair five shallow wells along the Puerco River and said the wells "are not expected to show any contamination, if at all, for several years". The Navajo Nation spent $100,000 on clean water, and in 1981, the New Mexico and federal governments stopped providing water, which they had delivered by truck since the spill.

An epidemiological study conducted by the NMEID in 1989 concluded that "the health risk to the public from eating exposed cattle is minimal, unless large amounts of this tissue, especially liver and kidney, are ingested". An Indian Health Service study found significantly higher levels of radionuclides in Church Rock cattle compared to livestock from non-mining areas. The study's authors advised that contamination would not pose a risk as long as residents did not depend on livestock for food over long periods of time, but local Navajos did. A few Navajo children were sent to Los Alamos to be checked for radiation exposure, but no long-term monitoring was undertaken, prompting a local writer to comment that the IHS spent more effort studying livestock than the people affected. No ongoing epidemiological studies have been done at Church Rock. Studies have shown since the 1950s that the Navajo have had significantly higher rates for some cancers than the national average, associated with contamination from the uranium mines and the exposure of workers to radiation.

== Cleanup ==
United Nuclear dispatched small crews with shovels and 55-US-gallon (210 L; 46 imp gal) drums to begin cleanup, but expanded the workforce after complaints from local residents and pressure from the state. The crews removed three inches (76 mm) of sediment from the river bed, retrieving about 3,500 barrels (560 m^{3}) of waste materials over the course of three months, but this amount was estimated as only 1% of the solid waste spilled. Groundwater remained contaminated by the spilled tailings solution, and rain transported leftover pollutants downstream into Arizona. New Mexico ordered United Nuclear to monitor pools left behind by the spill along the Puerco River, but United Nuclear measured only uranium levels, ignoring the presence of ^{230}Th and ^{226}Ra. The pools contained high levels of sulfuric acid and remained for more than a month after the spill, despite cleanup efforts by the New Mexico Environmental Improvement Division. The NMEID ordered United Nuclear to control tailings seepage from the mill in 1979, and the company implemented a limited seepage collective program in 1981.

The Navajo Nation appealed to the governor to request that the president declare the site a federal disaster area, but he refused, reducing the aid available to local residents. United Nuclear continued operation of the uranium mill until 1982, when it closed because of the declining uranium market.

United Nuclear neutralized the acidity of the tailings with ammonia and lime from 1979 to 1982. In 1983, the site was entered on the National Priorities List of the Environmental Protection Agency's Superfund investigations and cleanup efforts, as radionuclides and chemical constituents were found to be contaminating local groundwater. The EPA conducted a remedial investigation from 1984 to 1987, and in the NRC approved United Nuclear's closure and reclamation plan in 1988.

In 1994 the EPA extended its efforts with a study of all known uranium mines on the Navajo Nation. The EPA and United Nuclear removed 175,500 cubic feet (4,970 m^{3}) of radium-contaminated soil surrounding five buildings, some residential, in 2007. The soil was moved to an off-site disposal facility.

In 2003 the Churchrock Chapter of the Navajo Nation began the Church Rock Uranium Monitoring Project to assess environmental impacts of abandoned uranium mines, and build capacity to conduct community-based research with policy implications. Its May 2007 report found radiation many times higher than background levels remaining in the area, from both natural and mining sources.

In 2008, the US Congress authorized a five-year plan for cleanup of contaminated uranium sites on the Navajo reservation.

== See also ==
- Uranium mining and the Navajo people
- The Return of Navajo Boy
- The Navajo People and Uranium Mining
- Sequoyah Fuels Corporation
- Environmental racism
