= American Potash and Chemical Company =

American Potash and Chemical Company (sometimes abbreviated as AMPOT) was a large chemical manufacturer in the United States from the 1920s through the 1960s. It produced various chemicals for US industry and the US military. It was bought by Kerr-McGee in 1967, which reformed it into the Kerr-McGee Chemical Corporation (KMCC) around 1970.

== History ==
The company started by producing borax and potash from Searles Lake, at Trona, California. During World War II it diversified to other chemicals. In 1948, the company was San Bernardino County's second-largest employer, with 1,600 of Trona's 5,000 residents on the payroll.

In the 1950s it bought Eston Chemicals, Western Electrochemical, and the Lindsay Chemical Company and further diversified its product line. During the Cold war era it produced ammonium perchlorate for U.S. missile industry, particularly for Falcon, Hawk, Minuteman, Nike Zeus, Pershing, Polaris, Scout, Sergeant, Tartar missiles.

In the 1960s it bought a large interest in Compagnie des Potasses du Congo. In 1967 AMPOT was bought by Kerr-McGee. Around 1970 Kerr-McGee reorganized and AMPOT became the KMCC which in 2006 was spun off as Tronox.

When AMPOT bought the Lindsay Chemical Company it also got the Rare Earths Facility in West Chicago, Illinois.

== See also ==
- Cooper Chemical Company
