= University of Cincinnati College of Design, Architecture, Art, and Planning =

Art school at the University of Cincinnati

Coordinates: 39.13455°N 84.51870°W

- Motto: Juncta Juvant ("Strength in Unity")
- Type: Public (state university)
- Established: 1819; 207 years ago
- Dean: Stephanie Pilat
- Location: Cincinnati, Ohio, USA
- Campus: Urban
- Website: www.daap.uc.edu

The University of Cincinnati College of Design, Architecture, Art, and Planning (DAAP) is an arts and architecture college of the University of Cincinnati in Cincinnati, Ohio. It was initially established as the School of Applied Art in 1926.

== History ==
In 1922, the College of Engineering and Commerce started a Bachelors of Science degree in architecture, offering courses in architecture, landscape architecture. In 1935, the department became the School of Applied Arts. During the Great Depression, enrollment decreased and the school made changes to its alternating schedule of classes and cooperative education for male students.

Additional courses were added and by 1938, the school offered a Bachelors of Science in architecture, landscape architecture, and applied arts. In 1946, the name changed to the College of Applied Arts. A Department of Design was later added to the now College of Applied Art. In 1961, the name changed to the College of Design, Architecture and Art (DAA) and in 1979 reorganized into four schools to form the College of Design, Architecture, Art, and Planning (DAAP).

=== Deans of the College ===
- Dr. Ernest Pickering, 1946-1963
- Harold R. Rice, 1963-1975
- Bertram Berenson, 1975-1983
- Jay Chatterjee, 1983-2001
- Judith Smith Koroscik, 2001-2007
- Robert Probst, 2007-2018
- Timothy Jachna, 2018-2025
- Stephanie Pilat, 2025-present

== Departments and degree programs ==
DAAP is organized into four schools which each contain different programs, program tracks, minors, and certificates. The degree options the college offers are – bachelor of arts (BA), bachelor of fine arts (BFA), bachelor of science (BS), master of design (MDes), master of architecture (MArch), Master of Science in architecture (MSArch), Master of Arts in arts education (MAAE), master of fine arts (MFA), master of community planning (MCP), master of landscape architecture (MLA), Master of Science in landscape architecture (MSLA), master of urban design (MUD), and doctor of philosophy (PhD) – as follows:

- School of Design
  - Communication Design - Print/Motion/Interaction track (BS)
  - Design (MDes)
  - Fashion Design (BS)
  - Fashion Studies (Minor)
  - Industrial Design - Design track/Transportation track (BS)
- School of Architecture and Interior Design
  - Architecture (BS, MArch, MSArch, PhD)
  - Architectural Studies (Minor)
  - Interior Design (BS)
- School of Art
  - Art History (BA, Minor)
  - Fine Arts (BFA, MFA, Minor)
  - Games and Animation (BFA)
  - Arts Education (MAAE, Certificate)
- School of Planning
  - Urban Planning (BA)
  - Urban Studies (BS)
  - Community Planning (MCP)
  - Landscape Architecture (MLA, MSLA)
  - Urban Design (MUD)
  - Regional Development Planning (PhD)
  - Horticulture (BS, Minor)

== Academics ==
The college is distinguished for its mandatory co-operative education program, which was first conceived at the University of Cincinnati College of Engineering in 1906. Students alternate between working as paid employees in design firms and attending classes, giving them experience that enables them to easily enter the workplace after graduation. Students are required to spend a certain amount of time in the workplace, usually adding up to several years of job experience, before they are able to graduate. This extends most of the programs that would normally be four-year programs into five or more years.

== Campus ==
The college is housed in a facility consisting of four buildings: Frederick H. and Eleanora C.U. Alms Memorial Hall (1952, known simply as Alms), DAA Addition (1956, now referred to as the DAAP Building on most signage in the complex), the Wolfson Center for Environmental Design (1972), and the newest addition, the Aronoff Center. The Aronoff Center, which ties together the three older buildings and houses the college library, cafeteria, auditorium, art supply store, and photography lab, was designed by Peter Eisenman and opened in 1996.

=== Alms ===
The Alms Memorial Hall opened on October 17, 1952, for the cost of $200,000 in memorial of Frederick H. and Eleanora C.U. Alms. It was located on a knoll in Burnett Woods. The three-story brick and stone building was designed by architect James E. Allen and contained a lecture room, art gallery and library. It was the first of three buildings planned for the college.

=== Aronoff Center ===
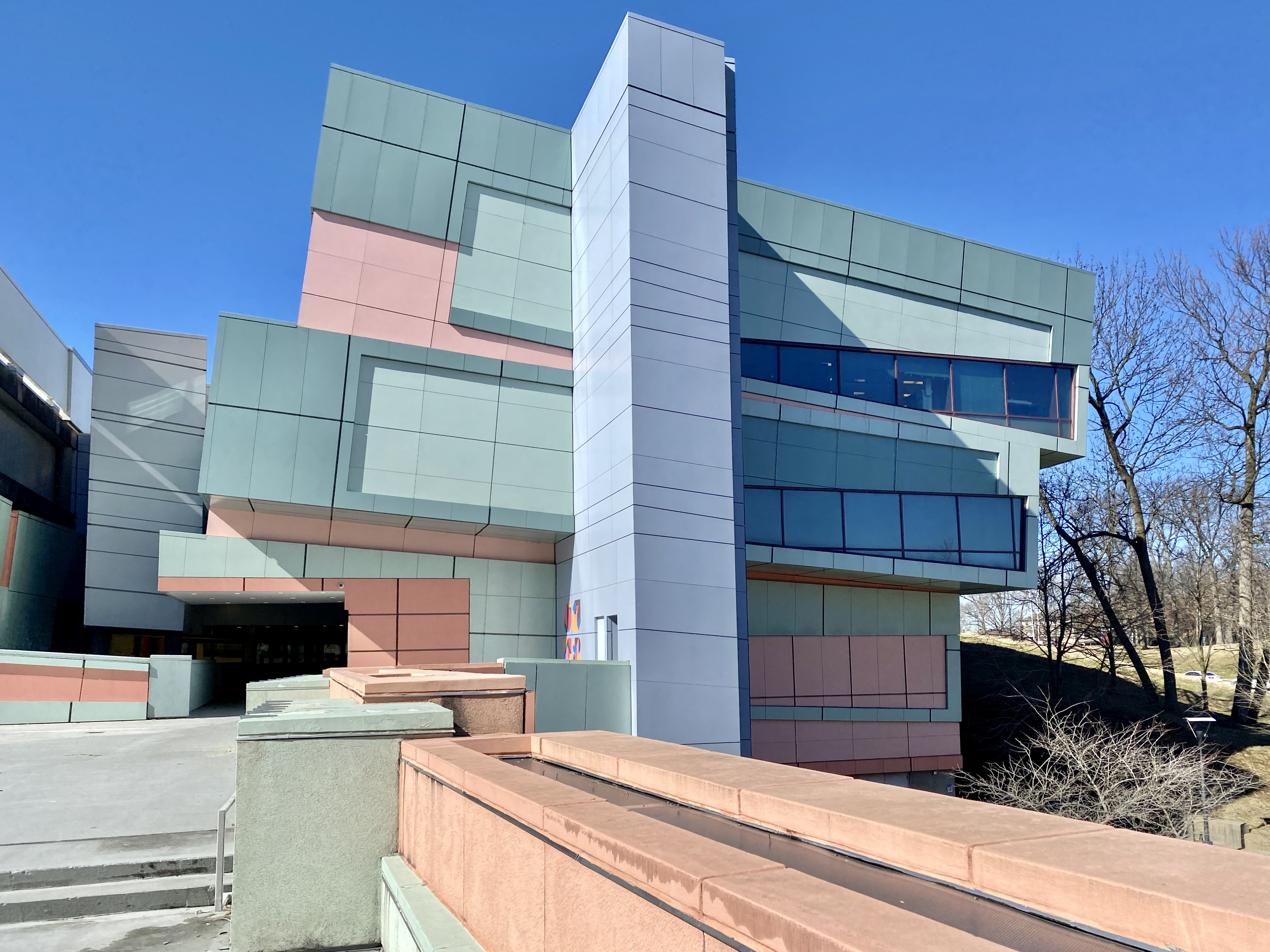
Aronoff Center, DAAP, University of Cincinnati, 2022

In 1988, Peter Eisenman was commissioned to design what would become the Aronoff Center along with Lorenz & Williams of Cincinnati. The team was selected amongst five internationally known architects: Arthur Erikson, Michael Graves, Charles Gwathmey, and James Steward Polshek. The project was anticipated to cost $20.8 million. The architects had all been asked to lecture students, faculty and the public during the interview process for the audience to better understand challenges and potential solutions of the expansion and renovation project at the university.

Eisenman's planned addition united the existing buildings of DAAP, sloping down a hill and adding studios, a theater, library photography darkroom, and offices with an atrium between the old and new buildings. While some of the faculty did not like the new design, Dean Jay Chatterjee in The Cincinnati Enquirer had the philosophy "that the building should be at the edge... We need something for the future and not repeat the past. If we don't do things at the edge of our profession, who will?"

The Stanley J. Aronoff Center opened in 1996 with wide acclaim, costing $35.3 million. The soft blue, pink, grey, and green unparallel building has an 800-foot-long central concourse that expands and contracts both vertically and horizontally. The concourse serves as circulation for the building, linking a central atrium with studios, auditoriums, a library, a cafeteria, and offices. The 140,000 SF building links with the old building doubling the size of the college. At its time of completion, the university was already recognized as "one of the most architecturally dynamic campuses in America" and the project – along with the Wexner Center for the Arts and the Greater Columbus Convention Center – helped solidify Eisenman's reputation as a leading architect and architectural theorist.

== Student groups ==
- American Institute of Architecture Students
- American Institute of Graphic Arts
- Alpha Rho Chi
- DAAP Tribunal – Membership in the DAAP Tribunal is open to all undergraduate DAAP students. The Tribunal serves to stimulate, coordinate, and sponsor various student activities. It also provides liaison with the Student Senate of the university and with the college faculty and administration through representation on many college committees.
- Fashion Design Student Association – Design students join this organization to promote social and professional activities with students at UC and in other schools, to sponsor programs and lectures, and to participate in community and professional activities.
- Fine Arts Association – The Fine Arts Association is an artists' organization, structured specifically to give undergraduate School of Art students a forum for the exploration and exhibition of their individual and shared expression. The FAA offers opportunities for development as an artist through the exchange of ideas as well as a chance for young artists to show their work. Through association sponsorship, the FAA provides a means for students to see shows at a distance from Cincinnati.
- Industrial Designers Society of America
- International Interior Design Association – A student chapter is maintained in the college to project and maintain artistic and ethical concepts of the interior design profession on an apprentice level, to promote high standards in public relations and design integrity, and to train for eventual professional practice. Guest speakers and designers assist in the chapter's yearly program.
- Planning Student Organization – This organization provides better communication among students in the School of Planning, and gives students a vehicle to participate in planning events on both a local and national level.
- Students for Ecological Design [SED] – SED was created to bring together and transmit knowledge between a collective of people interested in the education, promotion, and implementation of environmentally focused design. Specific goals include: promoting sustainable design education, sponsoring student participation in workshops and conferences, and playing an active role in applying these ideas throughout the community.
- DAAPCares – DAAPCares is a student-run organization aimed at promoting and practicing social design.

== Rankings ==
Located in the university's main campus in Cincinnati, Ohio, DAAP is consistently ranked as one of the most prestigious design schools in the U.S. and the world. In 2012, I.D. Magazine's listed the design school in the top ten design schools worldwide. Business Insider ranked the world's best 25 design schools listing DAAP as third, second only to RISD and MIT.

For 2005, the graduate architecture program was ranked second in the nation after Harvard and ranked as the most innovative architecture program in the nation. Two of "The New York Five" architects attended the University of Cincinnati: Michael Graves and John Hejduk (though Hejduk did not ultimately graduate from the program).

In 2008, the interior design program was ranked first in the nation for the ninth consecutive year in "America's Best Architecture & Design Schools", published by DesignIntelligence. New to the list in 2006 was the school's industrial design program ranking at No. 2, besting the Center for Creative Studies in Detroit and second only to the prestigious Art Center College of Design in California. The combination of these three top-ranking disciplines gave the college of DAAP the title as the Best Art College in the nation.

The college is also known for having the only School of Planning in the U.S. to have accredited programs at the undergraduate, graduate, and doctorate levels. Born out of the School of Architecture in 1961, their postgraduate degrees have been ranked at near the top in the Midwest as well as in the top 20 nationwide.

== Notable alumni ==
- Frank P. Austin, celebrity interior designer
- Jimmy Baker, artist
- Michael Bierut, partner at Pentagram
- Richard Lewis Blinder, architect
- Tim Brown, founder of Allbirds
- Paul Gilger, architect, conceived Jerry Herman musical revue Showtune, designed Industrial Light & Magic film studio for George Lucas
- Michael Graves, architect
- Hollis Hammonds, artist and academic
- John Hejduk, architect
- Stan Herman, fashion designer
- Sol Kjøk, artist
- Sam Lucente, industrial designer, Hewlett-Packard's VP of design
- Eva Maddox, interior designer
- Jim Mariol, industrial designer who created the Cozy Coupe
- Guy McElroy, art historian and curator
- David Opdyke, artist
- P. Craig Russell, comics artist, writer, and illustrator
- Linda Schele, art and education major, expert on Mayan inscriptions and hieroglyphics
- Sheida Soleimani, artist
- Frederick Steiner, ecologist and Dean of the University of Pennsylvania School of Design
- Tom Uttech, painter
