= West Chicago Public Library =

Library in West Chicago, Illinois, US

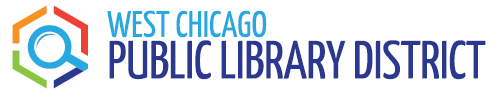
- 41.884124°N 88.205570°W
- Location: West Chicago, Illinois, United States
- Type: Public
- Established: 1934

Collection
- Size: 83,711

Access and use
- Circulation: 190,966 (2018)
- Population served: 29,924
- Members: 15,439

Other information
- Director: Benjamin Weseloh
- Website: wcpld.info

The West Chicago Public Library is the public library serving the city of West Chicago, Illinois. It is located at 118 West Washington street in downtown West Chicago. The library has a collection of 83,711 items that includes books, audio CDs, movies, magazines, video games, and other nonbook materials making up their library of things, and recorded a total of 109,029 library visits in 2018. West Chicago Public Library is part of the System Wide Automated Network (SWAN), which connects 97 libraries in many Chicago suburbs. They are a member of OCLC's global cooperative and RAILS delivery service.

== History ==
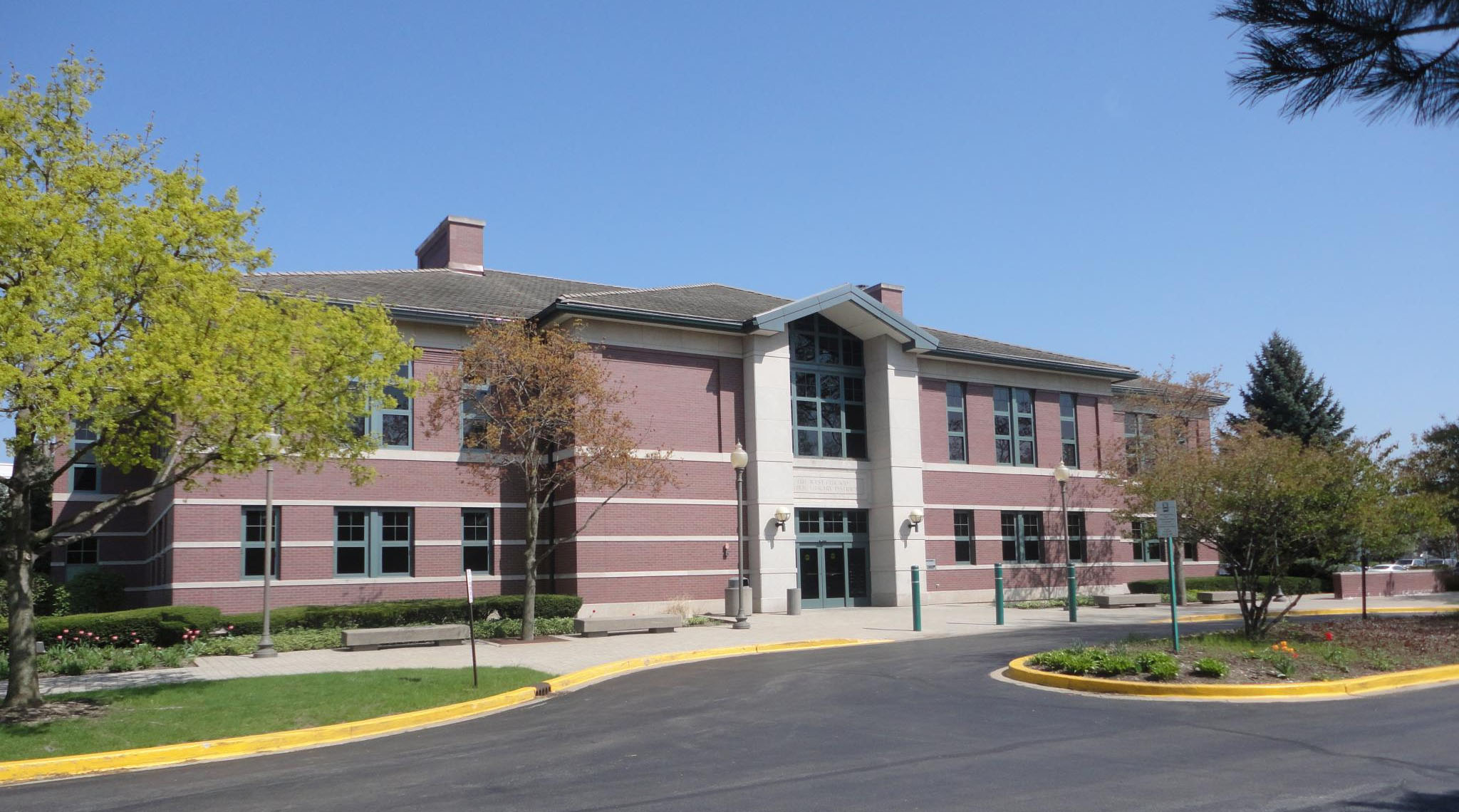
West Chicago Public Library building

Library services in West Chicago date back to 1856, when the Congregational Church included a library. In 1894, a reading room was established in the Bolles Opera House which was open two nights a week. The library began to organize and, by 1895, was open seven days a week. A volunteer library opened in 1929 on the second floor of the old City Hall, and in 1934 the Library became a municipal library. The library moved several times to different locations on Main Street before they moved to 332 E. Washington St. in February 1954, with State Senator Lottie Holman O’Neill as guest speaker at the groundbreaking. The West Chicago VFW stepped up to raise money for a new kardex and provide the new building with a flagpole. Adult books were held on the second floor. To allow access to more books, moveable units were installed that could be hand cranked to shift. Unless one pulled out the safety stops, it was possible to get caught in the middle of two shelves when more than one person was searching for books. A wing was added to the building in 1958. The West Chicago Public Library District was formed on May 1, 1986, as the result of a successful referendum converting the Library from a municipal to a district library. The Library District celebrated the opening of its current 27,052 square foot facility located on West Washington Street in August, 1993.

The West Chicago Public Library District was a member of the Library Integrated Network Consortium (LINC) until May 2018, when it officially joined the System Wide Automated Network (SWAN) along with LINC's seven other libraries and the MAGIC library consortium.

== Services and holdings ==
As of 2018 the West Chicago Public Library held 83,711 books and serial volumes, or 2.8 for every person in its service area. Circulation in 2018 was 190,966, more than 6 per capita. As of 2018, the library had 29 computer terminals for library users. The library offers tutoring and small group classes in computer skills. The city of West Chicago has a Hispanic population more than three times that of Illinois as a whole. 53% of West Chicago residents are non-native speakers of English. In recognition of this, the library offers extensive educational programs and materials in Spanish language.

The library's special collections include a digital catalog of book plates, which was gifted by West Chicago community member Cornelia Eames Anthony in 1935, and "was the result of Ms. Anthony's effort of collecting book plates over a 14-year time period.The book plate collection received by the West Chicago Public Library District Her book plate collection consists of approximately 10,000 book plates, is international in scope, and was at one time considered by many librarians to be second only to that of the Library of Congress." Cornelia Anthony was a formidable elocutionist providing dramatic readings to groups throughout the United States, but her greatest interest was in book plates. Also among the special collections are digital scans of West Chicago Community High School yearbooks dating from 1921 to the present.

== Registration ==
Residents within the West Chicago Public Library District may register online or in-person at the library. The library offers Non-Resident cards with payment of a yearly property-tax-based fee. Businesses that operate within West Chicago may apply in-person for a library card that may be shared between business staff, renewable each year. Residents of towns with SWAN member libraries are allowed West Chicago borrowing privileges upon presenting their home library card, though some restrictions do apply, according to WCPLD policy. Finally, all illinois residents have the right to obtain access to limited WCPLD materials as reciprocal borrowers, in accordance with the Illinois Library System Act.

Online registration is available via SWAN Library Services for West Chicago residents 13 years of age and older. Using this form will allow patrons access to the library's online resources, such as ebooks and audiobooks, and patrons may begin borrowing physical materials after confirming registration in-person at the library.

== Outreach ==
During its existence which began in June 2013, the B.E.N.D. (Books Enlighten, Nourish and Delight), donated books and magazines from the library to the young women incarcerated at IYC-Warrenville. The same year, the library partnered with the Northern Illinois Food Bank’s Summer Food Service Program to serve free lunch to the community's youth. Staff celebrated this as a time to serve the community both by feeding them and providing information about the library's information services, such as access to books and online resources.

== Outdoor art ==
The West Chicago Public Library is home to love even more, the statue by Chicago-based artist Matthew Hoffman. The statue was installed on the grounds of the West Chicago Public Library on August 8, 2018.

== Special events and programs ==
In 2015, the library received $3000 in grant money from the National Endowment for the Humanities (NEH) and the American Library Association (ALA) for the promotion and celebration of Latino history. As a part of this grant, they held viewings and discussions of PBS's "Latino Americans", displayed an exhibit entitled, "Building Community: Creating a Dialogue about Mexican Contributions to West Chicago through Oral Histories", and held a lecture on the history of Latinos in West Chicago in partnership with the city museum.

In honor of the 25th year in their current building, the library stayed open late on Friday, October 5, 2018, celebrating with live music, food, and special activities. Concurrent with this celebration, the West Chicago City Museum sold commemorating ornaments and the library offered Fine Forgiveness Tokens as a reward for those who attended programs during the month of September. In another endeavor toward celebration, the library announced a library card design contest where community members submitted designs based on their age category with their original artwork. Winners (one from each of the three age categories) received $50 Amazon gift cards and their designs were printed on the newest library cards. That same year, the library held a Harry Potter inspired Yule Ball on Friday, November 30, with crafts, food, and a scavenger hunt.

Yearly special events include participation in West Chicago's city trick-or-treating and winter Frosty Fest as well as a Dia de los Muertos celebration and often an "Unvalentines Day" put on by the YA Council. Frequently, the library accompanies the city's Halloween events with their own indoor parade and costume contest.

The library also works to present new relevant events, such as the "Sunsational Solar Eclipse", which they organized as the country prepared itself for the rare celestial event, which occurred from 11am to 2pm on August 21, 2017. In partnership with the STAR Library Education Network (STAR_Net), the library provided free glasses to help protect viewer's eyes as they took in the solar eclipse, though they, along with the other libraries in the area, quickly ran out of glasses due to high demand.

In preparation for the 2020 census, the West Chicago library became a Census partner, holding census recruitment fairs and providing information on the U.S. Census. Though they planned to hold an event at the library on April 1 to help community members complete the census, they moved the event online in the wake of COVID-19.

== West Chicago Public Library District Foundation ==
As a separate 501(c)(3) nonprofit organization made up of West Chicago resident volunteers, the West Chicago Library District Foundation raises funds to support the West Chicago Public Library. The foundation has provided the library with many updates such as renovating the program room and purchasing new chairs, a book scanner, gaming computers, a computer lab. With funding from the Foundation, the library installed public WiFi in tandem with the completion of the library's renovation and the West Chicago Community High School's implementation of student Chromebooks.

== Partnerships ==
Located around the corner from the library, the West Chicago City Museum frequently partners with the library for special events, programs, and book clubs such as the Historiography book club, a free monthly book discussion.
