= Herbert Newby McCoy =

American chemist (1870–1945)

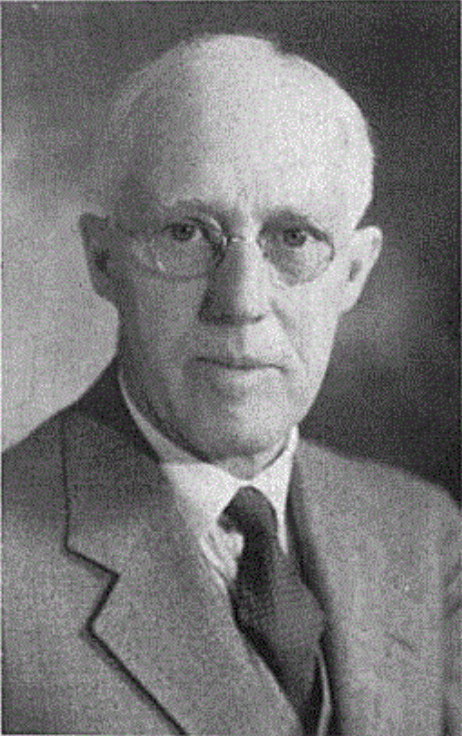
- Born: June 29, 1870; Richmond, Indiana
- Died: May 7, 1945 (aged 74); Los Angeles, California
- Education: Purdue University, University of Chicago
- Known for: Introduction to General Chemistry (1919)
- Spouse: Ethel Mary Terry
- Awards: Willard Gibbs Award
- Scientific career
- Fields: Radioactivity
- Workplaces: University of Chicago, University of Utah

Herbert Newby McCoy (June 29, 1870, Richmond, Indiana – May 7, 1945, Los Angeles, California) was an American chemist who taught at the University of Chicago and the University of Utah and was the vice-president of Lindsay Light & Chemical Company. He contributed numerous papers on physical chemistry, radioactivity and rare earths.

McCoy and his wife-to-be, chemist Ethel Mary Terry, wrote the three-volume set Introduction to General Chemistry (1919), Laboratory outline of General Chemistry (1920) and Teachers Manual and Notes (1920).

== Background ==
McCoy was born in Richmond, Indiana, on June 29, 1870. His father died when he was young, leaving him to earn his own education. He earned his BS (1892) and MS (1893) from Purdue University where he worked with Winthrop E. Stone. He worked as a chemist for Swift and Company in Chicago and as a teacher at Fargo College in North Dakota before returning to university. He earned his Ph.D. from the University of Chicago (1898), working with Julius Stieglitz. His Ph.D. dissertation was “On the Hydrochlorides of Carbo-phenylimido Derivatives” (1898).

== Career ==
McCoy was an assistant professor at the University of Utah (1899–1901), and taught at University of Chicago (1901–1917). He and his wife-to-be, Ethel Terry, wrote a three-volume introductory set of texts, an Introduction to General Chemistry, consisting of an introductory text, a laboratory manual, and a teacher's guide.

McCoy published numerous papers on physical chemistry, radioactivity and rare earths. He was the first person to demonstrate that the alpha-ray activity of a compound is proportional to its uranium content, quantitatively indicating that radioactivity is an atomic property. On this relationship is based a standard of measurement, the McCoy number. McCoy also proved that uranium is a parent of radium.

McCoy did considerable work with uranium and thorium, which at the time were believed to be rare earths. McCoy's research contributed to the understanding of relationships among elements in the period table. In 1904, he independently demonstrated spontaneous transmutation of radium from uranium. As well, McCoy and William H. Ross clearly identified what came to be known as isotopes as chemically inseparable substances, a realization that enabled researchers to simplify models of the periodic table. Studying what would become known as the thorium group, McCoy and Ross verified Otto Hahn's prediction of "mesothorium", an isotope of radium.

As early as 1911, McCoy introduced the term "synthetic metals". McCoy and William C. Moore attempted to use electrolysis to produce a metallic species from tetramethylammonium salts. Extending the work of Thomas Johann Seebeck (1770–1831) to organic quaternary amines, instead of simple ammonium salts, they reported what was believed to be the first organic metal. Electrolysis produced of a crystalline solid with a metallic luster which displayed electrical conductivity similar to that of metals. It was believed to be a mercury amalgam with the general formula HgN(CH3)4 until 1986, when Allen J. Bard proposed a more compelling explanation for the results.

McCoy was President of the Carnotite Reduction Company in Colorado (1917–1920). The Carnotite Reduction Company processed ore containing carnotite and manufactured radium. McCoy became a vice-president of Lindsay Light & Chemical Company in Chicago in 1919. Lindsay Light manufactured mantles for gas lights using radioactive thorium.

McCoy moved to Los Angeles in 1927. There he continued to study rare earths as a guest researcher in the laboratory of B. A. Stagner, and building his own private laboratory at home over his garage.

McCoy died on May 7, 1945 in Los Angeles, California.

== Recognition ==
McCoy received the Willard Gibbs Award in 1937. At that time, he was described by Marie Curie as the "foremost American authority on radioactivity".

The Herbert Newby McCoy Award at Purdue University was established in 1964 by Mrs. Ethel M. Terry McCoy in honor of her husband.
