= Oak Park Public Library =

Public library in Oak Park, Illinois, US

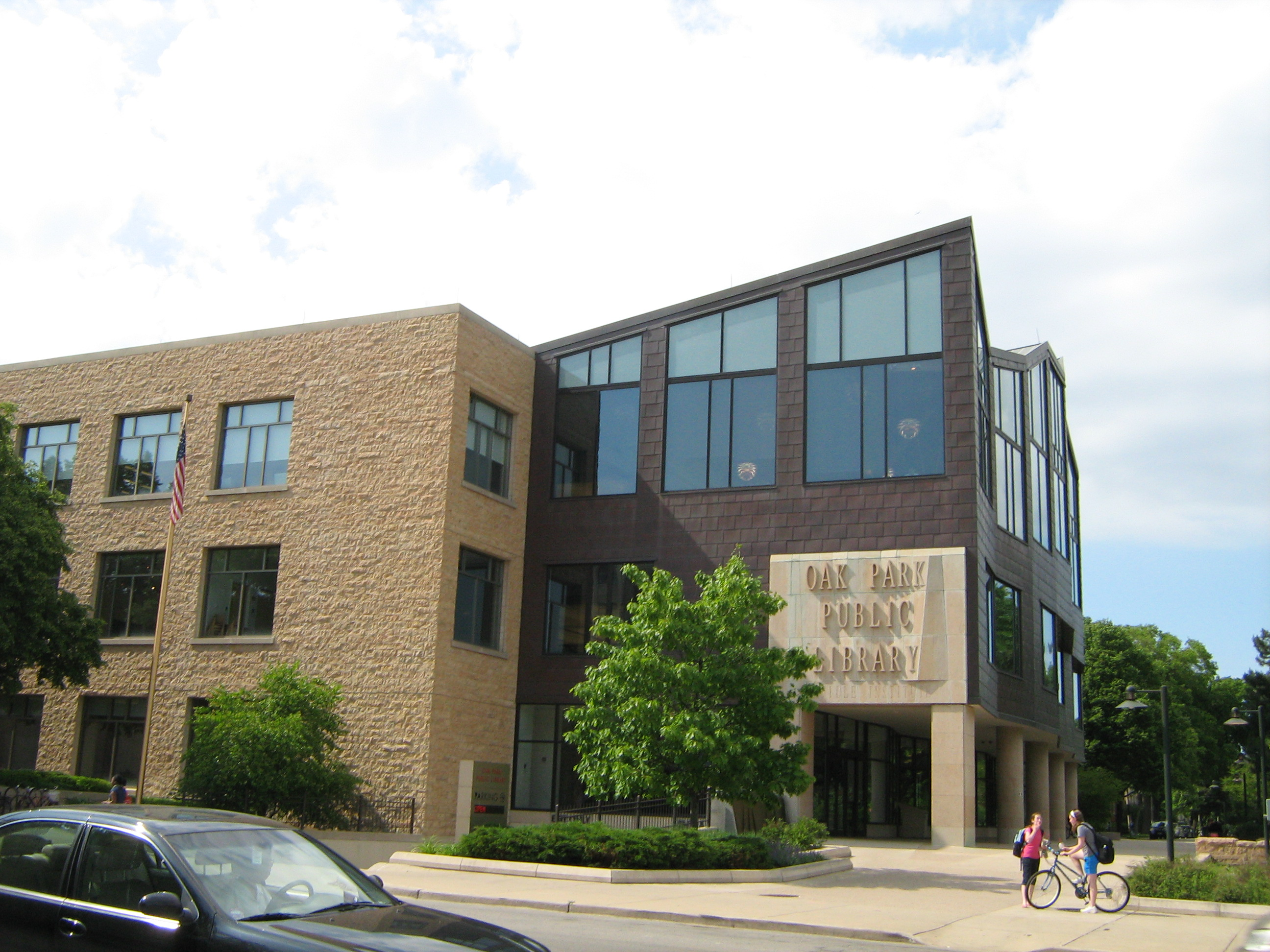
- 41.8892°N 87.7964°W
- Location: Oak Park, Illinois, United States
- Established: 1903
- Branches: 3

Access and use
- Circulation: 1,314,551
- Population served: 52,104

Other information
- Budget: $7.7 million
- Director: Elsworth Carman
- Employees: 125
- Website: www.oppl.org

The Oak Park Public Library is the public library system serving the village of Oak Park, Illinois, a suburb just west of Chicago. Founded as a public library in 1903, the library has three locations offering books, magazines, movies, music, computer access, and programs for all ages. In 2015, the three buildings were open 356 days, circulated more than 1.3 million items, recorded 864,712 building visits and 463,147 unique website visits, recorded 47,939 program participant visits, and was supported by 4,200 volunteer hours.

Oak Park Public Library is part of the System Wide Automated Network (SWAN), which connects libraries (including the neighboring River Forest Public Library) in many Chicago suburbs.

== History ==
=== Main Library ===
In 1902, Oak Park voters approved a tax to fund a public library. In 1903, citizens elected a Library Board of Trustees and established the first public library in Oak Park. The library was located in the Scoville Institute building at 834 Lake Street, and replaced a private subscription library housed in that building since 1888. The Scoville Institute remained the primary library location for over 50 years.

In 1961, the community approved a bond issue to construct a new library to replace the Scoville Institute. The architectural firm Holabird and Root was hired to design the new building. Construction began in 1963, and the new building was dedicated on May 31, 1964. The new building had a full basement, first floor, and a second floor covering half the building width, for a total of 42,324 square feet (3,932 m^{2}).

In 1977, the architectural firm Hammond and Beeby expanded the second floor to cover the entire width of the building, adding 8,000 square feet (740 m^{2}) and new children's and audiovisual areas.

As collections expanded, space once again became scarce. In 1999, a citizen's committee recommended that a much larger building be constructed – 100,000 square feet (9,300 m^{2}) or more – and the referendum process began again. The library had already acquired the adjacent property north of 834 Lake Street, the site of the Hemingway Interim House. That historic house was relocated in October 1999, thus clearing the way for a new Main Library building.

In 2000, Oak Park voters approved the library referendum to spend $30 million to build a new Main Library building, as well as to accelerate the repairs to the 63-year-old Maze Branch Library. The proposed new three-story Main Library building more than doubled the size of the previous building and offered the flexibility to meet future information needs. Nagle Hartray Danker Kagan McKay Architect Planners of Chicago and the interior design firm Eva Maddox Associates, Inc. of Chicago were selected as architects and interior designers of the new Main Library building.

The old building was demolished in the spring of 2002. During construction of the new building, the Main Library operated out of a temporary location at 215 Harlem Avenue in Forest Park. Construction of the new Main Library building was completed on schedule and under budget. On October 5, 2003, the new Main Library building reopened to the public at 834 Lake Street.

=== Dole Branch ===
In October 1918, a deposit collection was placed in Fair Oaks Pharmacy at Ridgeland and Chicago Avenues. In 1923, the North Branch of the Oak Park Public Library was opened as a storefront at 212 Chicago Avenue. It moved to 208 Chicago Avenue in 1932.

In 1939, Mr. and Mrs. Andrew Dole donated a building at the corner of Augusta and Cuyler to the Village of Oak Park to be used for "cultural and recreational purposes". In 1940, the North Branch Library moved to that remodeled building and became the Dole Branch Library.

=== Maze Branch ===
On October 5, 1915, the Oak Park Public Library opened the South Branch Library in a rented building at 429 Harrison Street. Twenty-one years later, on November 1, 1936, the South Branch Library moved to its present location on the corner of Gunderson Avenue and Harrison Street. Local architects E. E. Roberts and Elmer C. Roberts designed the building and its surroundings.

In August 1957, the South Branch was renamed the Adele H. Maze Branch. In 2005, the decision was made to refurbish the branch. The collection was moved off-site, and the building underwent a planned environmental remediation, including asbestos removal, in preparation for the extensive building work.

The original western extension of the building was demolished and an addition was constructed in its place. The new addition included expanded shelving for the collections, an elevator that provided access to all levels, and glass block windows on the lower level to improve lighting. Other renovations to the building included upgrades to the heating, air-conditioning, and wiring systems, a repair of drainage problems, and the construction of a front entrance ramp. Commemorative engraved bricks, purchased by staff and patrons to support the Maze Branch renovation, were installed at the southwest corner of the lot to create a storytime plaza near the existing terrace.

On June 3, 2006, the Adele H. Maze Branch Library reopened. In November of that year it was presented the Cavalcade of Pride award from the Community Design Commission of the Village of Oak Park.

== Services ==
As a member of the SWAN library consortium, the Oak Park Public Library offers its cardholders access to nearly 8 million items. Library cards issued by a SWAN library are valid at every other library in the consortium. Cardholders can also download and stream digital books, audiobooks, movies, and music through a collection of database subscriptions. Additional services include the following: home delivery for patrons temporarily or permanently unable to go to a library location; a Book Bike that serves as a mobile library; and the Oak Park Creates collection, which allows local creators to share their published works at the library as a part of the collection and through the SWAN library system.

The Library offers a unique Dial-A-Story services that provides 24/7 access to recorded content. Patrons can call 708-816-2800 from any phone and use the menu to navigate to various recordings. Children will especially enjoy story time on Dial-A-Story as it requires no internet access to use.

== Special collections ==
The library's Special Collections include rare editions, photographs, correspondence, and other artifacts from local figures such as Ernest Hemingway, Edgar Rice Burroughs, and Frank Lloyd Wright. Most recently, the library received an $86,900 grant from the Illinois Secretary of State, Jesse White, to digitize the Ernest Hemingway archived collections of the library and the Ernest Hemingway Foundation of Oak Park. The project is called "Hacking Hemingway: Cracking the Code to the Vault", and all digitized items are made available in the Illinois Digital Archives, accessible to everyone.

== Multicultural collection ==
The Dole branch of the library houses the Multicultural Collection which is made up of thousands of items, including artifacts, traditional clothing, games, books, posters, music, and films from around the world is a circulating library of items that was acquired in fall of 2016. The collection was established over 30 years prior by the local school district and had been housed by the local middle school. The decision to move the collection was a collaborative decision between the school district and the library. A couple of the notable items in the collection are an Aztec calendar stone and a 6-foot replica of Tutankhamen's sarcophagus.

== Governance ==
Oak Park voters elect seven library trustees for four-year terms. The Board of Trustees of the Oak Park Public Library is responsible for governing and overseeing library services, including determining library policies, employing a library administrator, securing adequate funds for library operations, approving expenditure of library funds, providing and maintaining adequate facilities, ensuring a representative selection of library materials, promoting use of the library within the community, as well as performing other duties, as outlined in Illinois Compiled Statutes.

== Friends of the Oak Park Public Library ==
As a separate 501(c)(3) nonprofit organization, the Friends of the Oak Park Public Library raises funds to support the Oak Park Public Library, with annual tax-deductible memberships available at multiple levels.
