= Geoffrey Laurence =

American painter

Geoffrey Laurence (born 1949) is an American realist painter. He lives and works in Santa Fe, New Mexico.

Laurence was born in Paterson, New Jersey. The child of Holocaust survivors, he was brought up and educated in London, England. He attended the Byam Shaw School of Art from 1965 to 1968, where he received the London Certificate in Art and Design and studied with Bridget Riley and Bill Jacklin. From 1968 to 1969, he studied graphic design under Tom Eckersley at the London College of Printing and then Saint Martins School of Art from 1969 to 1972 where he studied painting under Frederick Gore and received his BA. In 1992, he moved to New York and attended the New York Academy of Art where he studied with Eric Fischl, Wade Schuman and Vincent Desiderio and received his MFA Cum Laude in 1995. He is the recipient of grants from The George Sugarman Foundation, the Robert Rauschenberg Foundation, the Walter Erlebacher Award and a J. Epstein Travel Award. His paintings have been exhibited across the US and in Europe including the Las Vegas Art Museum, Yeshiva University Museum and the Arnot Art Museum. His work can currently be seen at the Museum of Biblical Art (Dallas) and the Fulginiti Pavilion at Anschutz Medical Campus.
