= Becca Bernstein =

American painter (born 1977)

- Born: 1977 (age 48–49)
- Education: Lewis and Clark College
- Known for: Painting

Becca Bernstein (born in 1977) is an American artist. She lives and works in Oregon and Scotland.

== Life and work ==
Bernstein was born in 1977 in Utah. She graduated from Lewis and Clark College in Portland, Oregon and studied at University of Glasgow. She interned at the Museum of Modern Art in New York City.

== Artistic work ==
In the summer of 2000, she survived two near-fatal car accidents. She recovered fully from spinal and internal injuries. The accident motivated her to make a tangible difference in the world and she combined her art work with working in care homes.

Much of her art addresses issues of community and human interdependence. Her work as activities director in senior care homes in Oregon and Scotland has led her to explore human relationships in the contemporary age.

Bernstein is best known for her paintings, particularly of elderly subjects. Her work focuses on human relationships, family, and ageing. She is noted for using unconventional materials like patchwork quilts and slate tiles. She explores issues of human fragility and strength. In her 2008 artist's statement for an installation she wrote:

"I am witness to the modern anomaly of dividing the tribe - of the separation of generations from one another, each to their respective institutions. As an artist, my interest in this subject has led me to seek out communities of all kinds for my work, both traditional and uniquely present-day, exploring the relationships we have developed or abandoned in this contemporary age."

Her work can be found in the public collections of the City of Lake Oswego, Oregon, the Interstate Firehouse Cultural Center, the Northwest Business for Culture and the Arts, the Oregon Ballet Theater, and the Grace Institute, New York. She is represented by galleries in Portland, Oregon, Park City, Utah, Minneapolis, Minnesota, and Aberdeen, Scotland. She also earned a grant from the Regional Arts & Culture Council for her 2008 conceptual installation in Portland.

== Awards ==
Bernstein won the Kimberley Gales Emerging Artist Award in 2005. She also won the Lake Oswego Public Art Award in 2007, and The George Sugarman Foundation Grant in 2007 for socially conscious artists.

In 2008, SouthWest Art named her as one of their 21 emerging artists.

== See also ==
- List of artists and art institutions in Portland, Oregon
