= Gwyneth Scally =

American artist

- Born: Washington, D.C., United States
- Known for: Figurative and psychological artwork exploring biology, religion, nature, and ecology.
- Notable work: "Jelly" exhibition
- Style: Figurative; contemporary
- Movement: Contemporary art
- Father: William Scally
- Awards: Community Foundation of Southern Arizona Buffalo Exchange Visual Arts Award (2003); George Sugarman Foundation Grant (2005)

Gwyneth Scally (born in Washington, DC) is a visual contemporary artist in New York, United States.

== Artwork ==
Scally's work is figurative and psychological, much of it deals with elevating biology over religion and with issues of nature and ecology. It includes large scale paintings, installation, and fiberglass sculpture. Scally worked as an artist in Arizona for the last decade. Her work has been shown internationally, and she has received numerous grants and awards. She received the Community Foundation of Southern Arizona Buffalo Exchange Visual Arts Award in 2003. In 2004 she completed a residency at the Red Gate Gallery of Beijing, China. In 2005 she showed "Jelly" at the Tucson Museum of Art and received a grant from The George Sugarman Foundation. In 2007 she held an exhibition, "Jelly", at the Mesa Contemporary Arts Center, Arizona, inspired by studies of jellyfish. The exhibition consisted of eight sculptures of jellyfish, six paintings and a panelled piece, each alluding to theological symbolism and evolutionary science.After working in Arizona, Scally relocated to New York in 2012. "In 2007, I spent the summer at an artist's residency in Newfoundland, Canada." Her work has been shown internationally. It has been featured in The Southern Review and New American Paintings.

== Personal life ==
Her father William Scally is a British political journalist in Washington and her mother is from an Italian community in the state of New Jersey.
