= Harold Rice =

American educator and magic dealer

- Born: Harold Randolph Rice; May 22, 1912; Salineville, Ohio, U.S.
- Died: July 10, 1987 (aged 75); Cincinnati, Ohio, U.S.
- Occupation: stage magician
- Known for: silk magic

Harold Randolph Rice (May 22, 1912 – July 10, 1987) was an American educator and magic dealer.

== Early life ==
On June 12, 1937, Rice married Thelma Ryle.

He earned his doctorate as an Arthur Wesley Dow Scholar from Columbia University. He earned additional degrees, including a B.S. in Applied Arts, a B.S. in Art Education (both 1934) and M. Ed. (1942), Ed. D. (1944), L.H.D. (1963).

== Magic ==
Rice credited the original Tarbell Course in Magic as a major influence. By the time he was an art major at the University of Cincinnati, he was building a handkerchief act. He designed and created his own silks.

He joined the International Brotherhood of Magicians (IBM) in 1929 and the Society of American Magicians in 1934. Local magicians persuaded him to make a colored square of silk for them and became a magic dealer. His silks became known for their brilliant colors, durability, and workmanship.

He founded Silk King Studios in September 1929. He and his spouse were soon marketing, silks, silk magic and effects.

In 1934 he proposed the forming of a magic dealers association to help with problems such as protecting the rights of those who invented or marketed new effects. In 1951 he served as the head of the Magic Dealers Association, Inc. He was its Secretary from 1952 until 1967.

In IBM, Rice served as International Secretary from 1940 to 1946, and served as Chairman of two International Conventions in Cincinnati in 1940 and 1942.

He wrote a column in The Linking Ring from 1932 until 1940.

== Career ==
He was appointed head of the Art Department, University of Alabama in 1944. In 1946 he left Alabama to become the dean of the Moore Institute of Art, Science, and Industry, in Philadelphia and in 1951 was promoted to president. In 1963 Rice returned to his alma mater, the University of Cincinnati, where he became the dean of the College of Design, Architecture, and Art (DAA).

== See also ==
- List of magicians
