= McAuley School District No. 27 =

- U.S. National Register of Historic Places
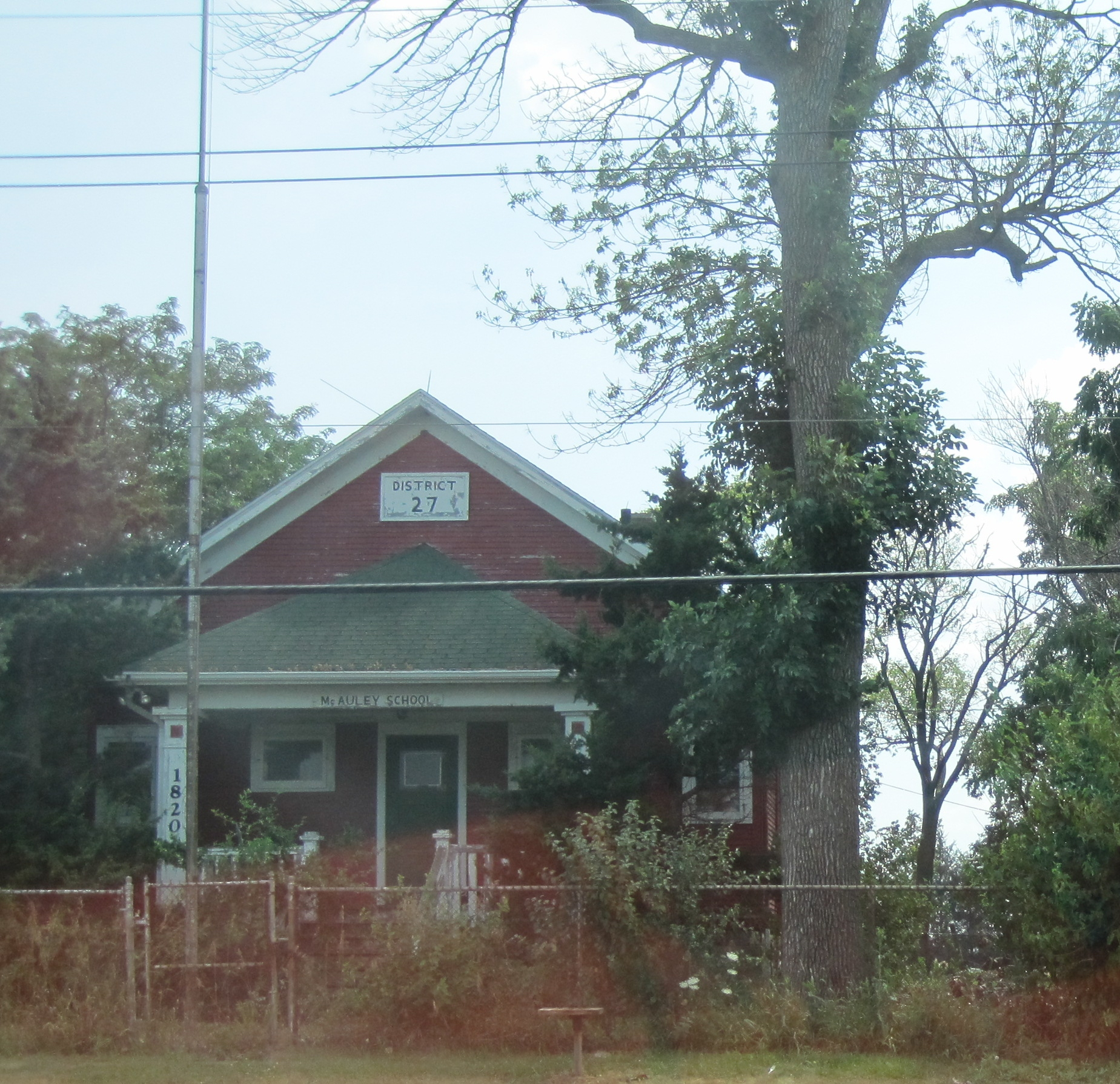

- Location within Illinois
- Location: Roosevelt Road, Winfield Township, Illinois
- Coordinates: 41°52′40″N 88°14′24″W
- Built: 1913
- Architect: Frank Hartman
- Architectural style: Neoclassical
- NRHP reference No.: 82004890
- Added to NRHP: June 3, 1982

The McAuley School District No. 27 is a schoolhouse in Winfield Township, DuPage County, Illinois, 1.25 miles (2.01 km) west from West Chicago, Illinois. By the time the schoolhouse was added to the National Register of Historic Places in 1982, District 27 was the last fully functioning one-room school district in Illinois. The final schoolhouse was built in 1913 on a school lot used since the 1850s; it closed in 1991 and the school district annexed into West Chicago Elementary School District 33 in 1992.

== History ==
The land for the school was donated by George McAuley in 1857. A school house was built on this site and served the community until 1913, when it was auctioned off. The current structure was built on the same site in 1913 and featured toilets, ventilation, and electricity, features that were considered progressive at the time. The designs and functionality of the school were strongly based on circular messages issued by the Illinois Office of Public Instruction. A garage built in the same year is also on the school site and has not been altered since its construction.

Illinois Gov. Henry Horner recommended in 1935 that all one-room schoolhouses should be demolished. By 1960, almost all of the one-room schoolhouses were destroyed or converted into meeting halls. As the last functioning one-room school in Illinois, the building was added to the National Register of Historic Places on June 3, 1982.

The school was built with a simple wooden frame and followed the rules issued by the Illinois Office of Public Instruction. It faces Illinois Route 38, also known as Roosevelt Road. The weatherboarded building is 28-by-25-foot (8.5 m × 7.6 m) with a concrete block foundation. Two square columns with wide entablature flank the entrance. On the inside, six black slate blackboards cover the south wall and a seventh is found on the west wall. Two small windows are found on each side of the entrance. The building underwent renovation in 1963. Carpet was placed on top of the hardwood floors on the top level and drywall was installed in the basement. A second door was also added on the west wall of the basement at this time.

West Chicago Elementary School District 33 is responsible for maintaining the building, which is too dilapidated to use as a museum.
