= Joan Bankemper =

American artist

Joan Bankemper is an American artist living and working in New York City. Her early 'social practice' or site specific garden/art installations blurred the boundaries of art and life. Bankemper is a 'situationist' and her ceramics are artifacts of a situation. In a 1994 review by Roberta Smith of The New York Times, Smith wrote "Bankemper is a veteran creator of idiosyncratic gardens, often portable. She is especially adept at recycling broken crockery and flowerpots into fantastical planters that are homages to Gaudi and Simon Rodia."

== Early life and education ==
Joan Bankemper was born and raised in Covington, KY in 1959. She earned a BFA from the Kansas City Art Institute in 1982 and an MFA from the Maryland Institute College of Art in 1985.

== Art and racing ==
Prior to moving to NYC, Bankemper maintained a studio in Baltimore, Maryland for seven years, while collaborating with Salvatore Scarpitta as a member of the pit crew and documenting dirt track sprint car racing. She made videos and "videograms" about "art and racing" exploring speed, competition and high risk: art and racing. In 1985, Scarpitta pushed the boundaries of art by taking an 'art object', a race car, and making it functional by racing it in real time on a dirt track. Scarpitta's repeating act of racing a car, exhibiting it in a museum or at Leo Castello Gallery, then immediately racing it again on a dirt track, qualify him as an early 'situationist'. Bankemper was a founding member of the historic Scarpitta/Castelli race team.

Bankemper's videos and videograms have been exhibited at the Leo Castelli Gallery, NY, The Museum of Contemparty Art, LA; The Detroit Institute of Arts; Marianne Boesky Gallery, NYC and the Hirschhorn Museum, DC, to name a few.

In 2015, Bankemper wrote her accounts of those racing years in A Good Run: 1983-1990, the book was published by Edgewise Press along with a limited edition portfolio: Scarpitta/Bankemper: 5 + 10. This contains a collection of five videos by Scarpitta and Bankemper, Bankemper's book: A Good Run: 1983-1990 and ten "videograms" derived from the video Sal is Racer. Previews of the videos are posted on Vimeo: Sal is Racer, Racer's Tattoo, Potato Masher, Message to Leo, Crash.

== Work ==
Upon moving to NYC, Bankemper's gardening art began in Soho, an arts district in Manhattan, in 1993 when she undertook three public garden projects using the 'art and life' model of the Situationist movement. Bankemper created 'situations' in real time, challenging how art functioned. She did this by bringing the garden, or living elements, into the gallery and by bringing concepts of art to the environment. Through these gardens, she wanted to emphasize the healing potential of herbal medicine and the history of women practicing healing arts as herbalist. Christine Temin wrote: "She believes growing things is good for you".

While an artist in residence at Artpace, Kathryn Hixson said "Throughout her ongoing projects, blending nature and humanity, Bankemper's idealism continues to stretch the rules of what art can be, from a simple pot to a transformational experience of nature."

Bankemper has committed her practice to the intersection of nature and culture in private and public realms. Through her community gardens, eco-activism and recycled sculptural objects, Bankemper has transformed abandoned lots, urban rooftops, overlooked historic sites, derelict parks and industrial sites into gardens that bring life to their own ecosystem with people, birds and animals that inhabit them.

=== Ceramics ===
Out of her 'social practice', Bankemper makes ceramic 'artifacts'. Initially, the ceramic urns were produced for Brent Sikkema Gallery, NY, then Wooster Gardens, in response to the many friends who died of AIDS. Each pot was made of broken dishes and filled with medicinal plants. In one of her signature series, she only used discarded teacup handles and coffee mugs. Her new ceramic work utilities high-fired, handmade porcelain buttons attached to canvases, incorporating such so-called prosaic skills as sewing while also addressing the issue of how things get held together. Bankemper's ceramic mosaics follow her love of nature. Working in the way a collagist might, she starts to dress the cloak of the vessel with her vocabulary of images, contemporary china, hand built objects, castings from molds. Bankemper creates an original tableau in ceramic. These are not simple pieces; they are complex tapestries of life. David Cohen states, "the pristine kitsch of each piece is preserved while the juxtaposition with the accumulated fellows in an exuberant hierarchy amounts to a glorious sum greater than its individual parts."

=== Black Meadow Barn ===
In 2008, Bankemper founded the Black Meadow Barn, which is located on the banks of the Black Meadow Creek. It is a 150 year old farm, located in the Hudson Valley of New York. Bankemper says "the barn is a place where 'culture and horticulture meet'", where sustainable farming is not only theorized but practiced. She continues to cultivate gardens, ceramics and 'conversations' at the Barn, often including visual artists, farmers and culinary experts.

== Exhibitions ==
Bankemper's site specific installations and gallery exhibitions include "A Medicinal Garden" with Creative Time, Inc., NYC 1995; the "Dovetail Garden", Charlotte, NC, 2001; "Joan Bankemper - A Gardner's Diary", 2000 at Isabella Stewart Gardner Museum, Boston, MA; "Intoxication or the Echo of one Hand Clapping" 1993–94 at The New Museum, NY. Bankemper had two solo exhibitions with Nancy Hoffman in 2007 and 2011; her objects are included in numerous private collections. Bankemper has exhibited environments and aspects of her social practice with Amy Lipton Fine Art.

== Awards ==
In 2010, Bankemper received the Gabi Award from the McColl Center for Visual Art, she received the 'Judges Choice' award in 2004 in Charlotte, NC.

Artist in residence awards include:

- Isabella Stewart Gardner Museum, Boston, MA, 2000;
- Artpace International Residency, San Antonio, TX, 1998,
- McColl Center for Visual Art, Charlotte, NC, 2001, where she received a National Endowment of the Arts Award and the North Carolina Arts Council Award.

She received grants from the Council on the Environment, NYC and The George Sugarman Foundation, Novato, CA, 2001.
