= Romolo Del Deo =

American artist and teacher (born 1959)

- Born: January 1, 1959 (age 67); Provincetown, Massachusetts, U.S.
- Education: Harvard University (BA); Accademia di Belle Arti di Firenze
- Occupations: Sculptor; artist; educator
- Parent(s): Salvatore Del Deo; Josephine Couch Del Deo

Romolo Del Deo (born January 1, 1959) is an American sculptor, artist, and teacher. Best known for his bronze sculptures that put a “contemporary spin on the classical,” Del Deo’s art primarily explores two aesthetic themes: the debris that washes up on the shores of his native Provincetown, MA, and the archeological ruins of Italy. Del Deo is founder of the “Long Art” movement, and his work attends to the contemporary crisis surrounding sustainability and production while expressing, through touchstones in the mythological and classical, “the eternal.”

== Early life ==
Del Deo was born on January 1, 1959, in Provincetown, Massachusetts to Italian-American painter Salvatore Del Deo and American writer and historian Josephine Couch Del Deo, who co-founded the Fine Arts Work Center. In his youth he studied in the studio of his father and with sculptor Joyce Johnson. At 18 he travelled to Pietrasanta, Italy, where he apprenticed in stone carving and bronze casting. He returned to the US to earn a BA from Harvard University in 1982. While he was an undergraduate, he was the studio manager for Harvard’s Professor of Sculpture, Dimitri Hadzi. Del Deo studied abroad at the Academy of Fine Arts in Florence and prepared his honors thesis on polychromatic sculpture during his time there.

== Career ==
Since 1982, he has been exhibiting professionally in the U.S. and internationally. Following his graduation from Harvard University, Del Deo joined the Visual and Environmental Studies department and became an Artist-in-Residence Associate at Adams House, Harvard University. In the 1980’s he began exhibiting at the Ethan Cohen Gallery Art Waves in the Soho neighbourhood in New York City, and in the 1990’s he exhibited at Bridgewater/Lustberg Gallery in Soho and Kouros Gallery in Midtown. In 2000, he won the Harvard University President’s Award for Contribution to the Arts. His monumental bronze sculpture, “Creation Doors,” (2000) was displayed at the Church of the Transfiguration in Orleans, Massachusetts. Commencing in 2012, work is in progress for him to sculpt a monumental Provincetown Fishermen’s Memorial, and in 2013 he unveiled a scale model of the planned tribute. In 2015, he established the Studio Romolo Atelier, a studio school for sculpture where he serves as director. The school offers art workshops and retreats and has hosted sculpture courses in Pietrasanta, Italy. In 2016, he exhibited at the first annual International Open Art Code at Palazzo Franchetti in Venice, Italy. In June 2018, he presented a Tedx Provincetown talk titled “ReNaturing Light,” on the benefits of natural light for creativity and well-being. He is a founding member on the board of directors of the Newport News Public Art Foundation and monumental sculpture Melpomene is also featured in the collection. His work has recently been featured in the Provincetown Monument Museum exhibit, “Creating a Difference,” and he represented the United States at the 2019 St. Petersburg, Russia VIII International Cultural Forum. In 2019, he delivered a public talk called “Art on the edge: about money, technology and creativity” at the Business Platform of the VIII St. Petersburg International Cultural Forum.

In 2020, he co-founded the Del Deo Foundation for the Arts, a non-profit organization dedicated to supporting the arts. The MISP (Museum of 20th & 21st Century Art in St. Petersburg, Russia) featured his work in the international survey exhibition, “The Looking Glass and Behind It,” in 2020. In January 2021, he delivered a lecture titled “Crossing Fates: Patronage through the eyes of creators” for the Sheremetevsky Palace of the St. Petersburg State Museum of Theater and Musical Art. He curated an exhibition, “Figuratively Provincetown,” for Boston’s LaMontagne Gallery in 2021 His exhibition, “The Tree of Life Which Is Ours” will be featured in the Venice Art Biennial from April 2022 through November 2022.

== Recognition ==
Honors he has received include George Sugarman Foundation, the Henry Moore Foundation, the New York Foundation for the Arts, the Gottlieb Foundation, and the Provincetown Art Association and Museum 2nd Annual National Award. As a winner of the Lorenzo il Magnicio medal, Romolo Del Deo was the sole representative of the United States at the 2017 G7 of Culture exhibition in Florence, Italy.
