= George Sugarman Foundation =

The George Sugarman Foundation, Inc. is a non-profit organization founded in 2001 to honor the memory and wishes of George Sugarman.

== History ==
George Sugarman (1912–1999) was an American artist working in the mediums of drawing, painting, and sculpture. Often described as controversial and forward-thinking, Sugarman's prolific body of work defies a definitive style. He pioneered the concepts of pedestal-free sculpture and is best known for his large-scale, vividly painted metal sculptures. His innovative approach to art-making lent his work a fresh, experimental approach and caused him to continually expand his creative focus. During his lifetime, he was dedicated to the well-being of young emerging artists, particularly those who embraced innovation and risk-taking in their work. In his will, Sugarman provided for the establishment of The George Sugarman Foundation, Inc.

== Foundation work ==
From 2001 to 2008, the George Sugarman Foundation awarded monetary grants to emerging visual artists who were engaged in creating new works of fine art and whose work showed promise and conceptual innovation. As of 2009, the George Sugarman Foundation, Inc. shifted its focus away from offering grants to artists in order to serve the wishes of George Sugarman through the donation of his artwork to American institutions, museums, and universities.

== Grant recipients ==
2001

- Joan Bankemper
- Paula Busch
- Steve "Pablo" Davis
- Helene Lhote
- Marsha Rich
- Paul Salscheider
- Harry Simpson
- Mark Taylor
- Marvin Werlin

2002

- Romolo Del Deo
- Cynthia K. Evans
- Darlys Ewoldt
- Jan Frank
- Edgar Jerins
- Caspar Henselmann
- Nathan Horner
- China Marks
- Susan Matthews
- Phyllis Gay Palmer
- Jerry Dane Sanders
- Eric B. Semelroth
- Julie Orsini Shakher

2003

- Sachiko Akiyama
- Timothy Blum
- Holly Boruck
- Anne Boysen
- Matt Brackett
- Virginia Bryant
- Shaila Christofferson
- Edith Dakovic
- Pamela Dodds
- Theresa Durand
- Emily Ehmer
- Keina Davis Elswick
- Mara Held
- Kathleen Holmes
- Michael J. Kane
- Jarmo Karjalainen
- Biganess Livingstone
- Nestor Madalengoitia
- Mario Naves
- Chris Piazza
- Betty Schoenberg
- Diane Van der Zanden
- Alex Walker

2004

- Jonathan Allen
- Lauren Baker
- Daniel Bilodeau
- Gina Blickenstaff
- Timothy Blum
- Aaron Board
- Shelly Bradbury
- Noah Buchanan
- Claudia Cohen
- Donna Coleman
- Andrew Conklin
- Tamra Conner
- Dianne Corbeau
- Ian Everard
- Cristina Figueredo
- Frankie Flood
- Rik Freeman
- Nancy Friese
- Susan Hagen
- Susan Hauptman
- David Hayes (sculptor)
- Sean Hopp
- Leeah Joo
- Ellen Kozak
- Adela Leibowitz
- Kristin Lerner
- Kimberly Maier
- Sandy Oppenheimer
- Xan Palay
- Gael Perrin
- Jane Richlovsky
- Steff Rocknak
- Joan Ryan
- Eleanor Seeley
- Rosa Valado

2005

- Sony Marlon
- Ejiro Akpotor
- James Xavier Barbour
- Michele Benzamin-Miki
- Tom Block
- Jeanne Marie Ferraro
- Michael Ferris, Jr.
- Cristina Figueredo
- Rossy Finol
- Kathleen Fruge-Brown
- Michel Gerard
- Katrina Miller Hawking
- Michael Kane
- Jinchul Kim
- Isabella Gibbs Kirkland
- Sol Kjøk
- Todd Kurtzman
- Michael Massenburg
- Susan Matthews
- Jack Montmeat
- Lazarus D. Nazario
- Leslie Parke
- Natalia Rosenfeld
- Gwyneth Scally
- Catherine Schmid-Maybach
- Eleanor Nanci Seeley
- Miroslaw Struzik
- Richard Marc Weaver
- Holly Jennifer Wong
- Victor Zubeldia

2006

- Cynthia Consentino
- Meghan Cox
- Fletcher Crossman
- Joan Green
- Caspar Henselmann
- Jasmine Hernandez
- Dale Horstman
- Elizabeth Insogna
- Edgar Jerins
- Joe Kight
- Valeri Larko
- Geoffrey Laurence
- Nina Levy
- China Marks
- Greg Mueller
- Brian Owens
- Joyce Polance
- Kirstine Reiner
- Jane Richlovsky
- Lynn Sures
- Lois Teicher
- Cary Wiegand
- Don Williams

2007

- Sophia Ainslie
- Marlene Aron
- Laura N. Atkinson
- Becca Bernstein
- Aaron Morgan Brown
- Crystal Z Campbell
- Ke-Hsin Jenny Chi
- Morgan Craig
- Sherri Dahl
- Alicia DeBrincat CV
- Donna Dodson
- Keina Davis Elswick
- Michael Fitts
- Norma Greenwood
- Nathaniel Christopher Hester
- Lynn Irene Jadamec
- Anna Kipervaser
- Todd Kurtzman
- John Lambert
- Anna Lee-Hoelzle
- Cathy Lees
- Chris Leib
- Pamela Matsuda-Dunn
- Daniel McCormick
- Jim Morris
- Arny Nadler
- Sarah Wallace Petruziello
- Gary Lee Price
- Michele Ramirez
- Lorna J. Ritz
- Darrell Keith Roberts
- Dasha Shkurpela
- Rene Smith
- Gary Haven Smith
- Margot Spindelman
- Julia Stratton
- Suzanne Stryk
- Willem Volkersz
- Christina Anne West
- Holly Jennifer Wong

2008

- John E. Stallings
