= Xan Palay =

- Born: Alexandra Palay; June 10, 1970 (age 56); Cleveland, Ohio, U.S.
- Occupation: Sculptor
- Style: Installation art

Xan Palay (born Alexandra Palay on June 10, 1970) is an American installation art sculptor based in Columbus, Ohio.

== Life ==
Xan Palay was born in Cleveland, Ohio. She produces art in a number of media, including sculpture, sound, video, installation art, and fiber. Often her art is interactive or involve viewer participation.

Palay has received Individual Artist Fellowships from the Ohio Arts Council and Arts Midwest. In 2000 she was awarded an Artists Project grant from the Ohio Arts Council. In 2004, she was awarded a grant from The George Sugarman Foundation.

Palay has been a resident artist at the Contemporary Artist's Center in Massachusetts (‘94), at the Yaddo colony in New York City (holding the Louise Bourgeois Endowed Residency (‘96), and at the Kohler Arts/Industry program in Wisconsin (‘00). She has been a visiting artist at The Ohio State University (Columbus, Ohio), Hastings College (Hastings, Nebraska), Aichi University of Education (Aichi, Japan), Tokyo Glass Art Institute (Tokyo, Japan) and at the Forest of Creation (Kanazu, Japan).

In 2000 she installed a permanent public sculpture of the rooftop of the SPACES gallery in Cleveland, Ohio.

In September 2005 she was awarded a solo show at the Columbus Museum of Art funded by the museum and the Greater Columbus Arts Council.

In June 2006 a sound recording of Palay's was featured on NPR's All Things Considered.
