= Sol Kjøk =

Norwegian artist

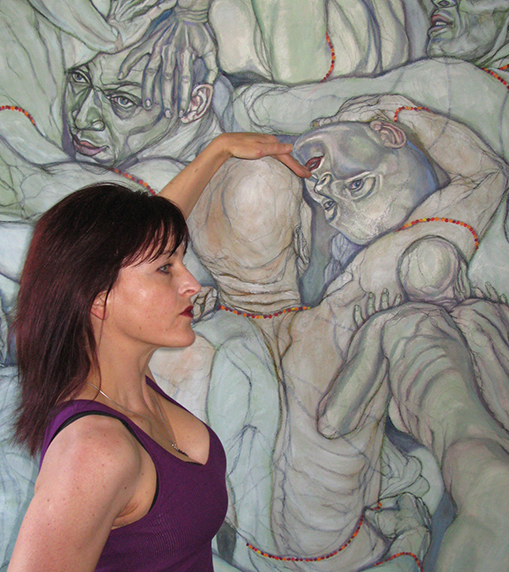
- Kjøk in 2014
- Born: Solveig Kjøk; Lillehammer, Norway
- Education: Parsons School of Design, NYC; University of Cincinnati-DAAP, Sorbonne, Paris; Universität Wien, Vienna
- Known for: Painting, drawing
- Website: solkjok.com

Sol Kjøk is a Norwegian-born, NYC-based visual artist and founder of NOoSPHERE Arts, a nonprofit exhibition and performance venue on the Lower East Side in Manhattan. She lives and works at The Mothership NYC, the arts collective she founded in Brooklyn in 2005. In 2015, she started Last Frontier NYC, a new collaborative arts platform for international artists and performers, calling it "a campfire where the creative tribe can share its stories".

== Life and career ==
Sol Kjøk was born in Norway, where she grew up partly in Lillehammer, partly in Valdres. She has drawn since her early childhood and had her first professional exhibition when she was sixteen. Since then, her work has been in shown in 100 + shows worldwide in some twenty countries, including eight solo exhibits in the United States and Europe. After studying in Paris, Vienna, Medellín and the US, she obtained four graduate degrees, including a Magistère from the Sorbonne, The University of Paris, a Master of Arts in art history from the University of Cincinnati and an MFA in Painting from Parsons The New School for Design. Kjøk has received over fifty awards and grants, including from the Tallinn International Drawing Triennial, the National Academy Museum and School in New York, Robert Rauschenberg Foundation, Arts Council Norway, Office for Contemporary Art Norway, Vederlagsfondet, The Puffin Foundation, The Relief Fund for Visual Artists, Knut Hamsun's Award, The George Sugarman Foundation and the American-Scandinavian Foundation. In addition, she has received project support from the Royal Norwegian Embassies in Beijing, Berlin, Manila, New York and Tallinn. She has taught in art schools and universities as well as lectured at museums and art centers throughout Europe and the US. Her works, which originate as performance, are in the permanent collections of the Cincinnati Art Museum, the Teckningsmuseet in Laholm, Sweden, the Kunsthaus Tacheles in Berlin, Germany and The Osten Museum of Drawings in Skopje, Macedonia, as well as numerous private and corporate collections throughout the world, and also presented online through the platform Singulart. She was chosen as one of twenty-one contemporary artists to be featured alongside Old Masters in the widely used textbook Drawing Essentials by Deborah A. Rockman published by Oxford University Press.

== Work ==
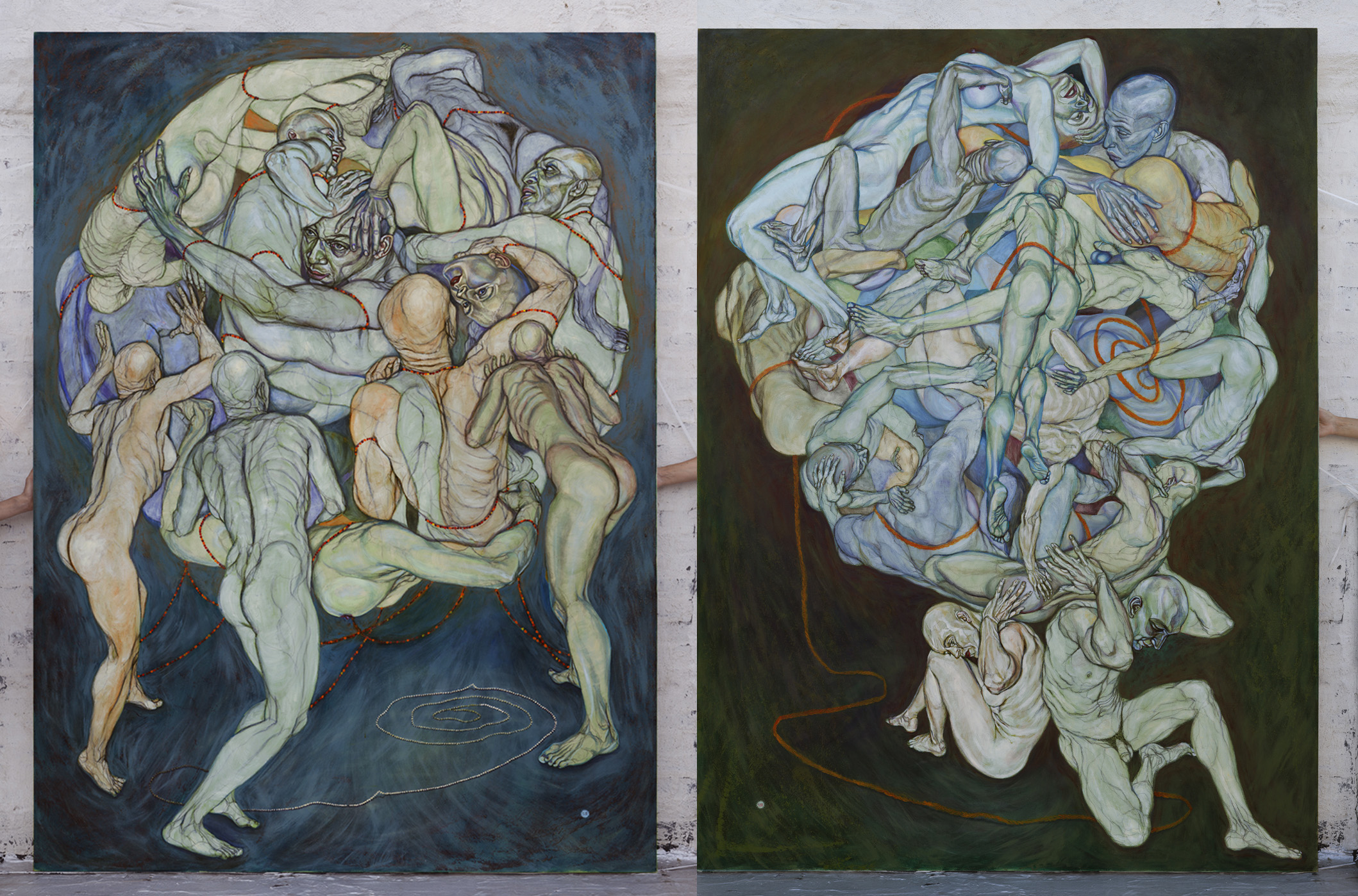
Strings Attached and Stitched with Its Color, 2008–2013

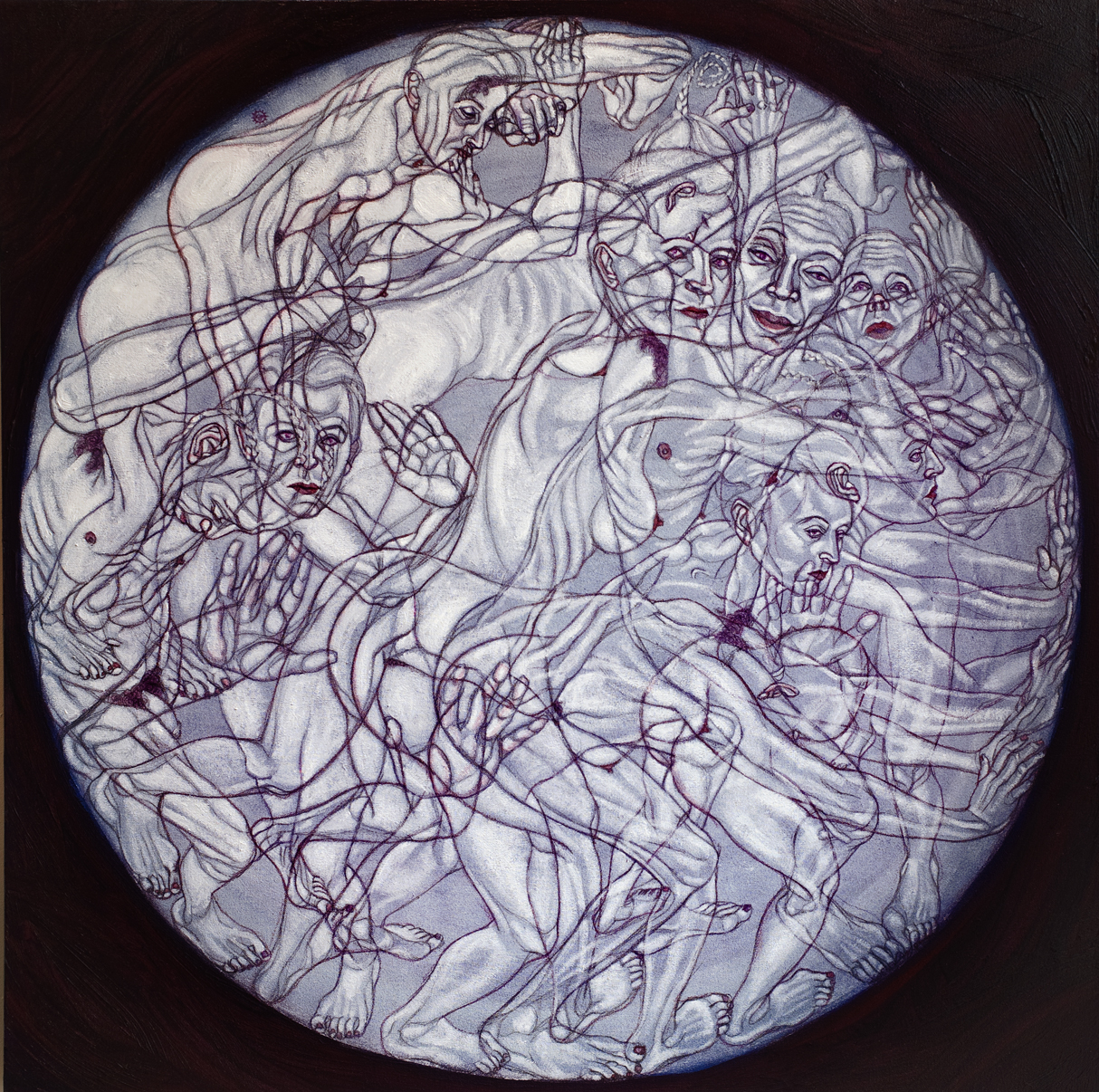
Getting There, 2014

Kjøk specializes in painting, drawing and performance with a focus on the nude figure. Her work broadly addresses the fundamental interconnection and interdependence of all things, as well as the constraints imposed by the human body. New York art critic Meghan Dailey describes her core themes as "the body, its limits and the tension between its strength and its vulnerability." In contrast to other artists who portray the nude at rest, Kjøk's bodies are usually in constant motion. This dynamic quality springs from her unique, highly athletic, immersive artistic technique. Her work begins in her studio, with she and her models engaging in an acrobatic process, "which incorporates picture taking, laborious posing and performance, cutting, collaging, rearranging and finally meditative reassemblage through drawing and painting..." Her models often include fellow artists, who join her in acrobatic exercises. This collaborative and physical process helps her articulate, in visual form, the paradox of strength and vulnerability in the human condition.

Kjøk, a marathoner, approaches large-scale wall drawings as an "extreme sport". Of her 2009 solo-exhibit at Kunsthaus Tacheles, it was reported; "The wall work in Berlin was made in one week, during which Sol Kjøk lived in the gallery and worked virtually around the clock for seven intense consecutive days." About the same exhibit, Meghan Dailey wrote, "For much of that period, she is alone (solitude being the optimal condition for maximum concentration), eating and sleeping very little. In the course of working so intensely, notions of the self and of time collapse, until mentally and physically, Kjøk reaches a heightened state in which she feels a part of the piece." Kjøk has completed "wall drawing as extreme sport" rounds in four countries.

Although highly physical in both its subject and execution, Kjøk's art also incorporates many spiritual themes. Of the paradoxically corporeal and spiritual quality of her work, Noel Kelly (curator) wrote "There is no doubt that these are sexual figures, However, the sometimes contorted physiognomy and physicality of the figures speaks of the sublime; a rapture wherein strength, tenderness, vigour and tempestuous urgency portray the essence of the human state." Jason Franz of Xavier University echoed this, saying "Ms. Kjøk writes of love, but her images are not necessarily sexual; at least no more than any other human image. No, if they are born of love, and therefore evoke love, it is of a higher order." Kjøk herself acknowledges this duality in her artist's statement, saying "I used to think that monastic seclusion at a safe distance from my body was the way to knowledge. Now I am convinced that human beings are clothed in flesh for a reason: The path is through the skin. In her artist statement, Kjøk elaborates this vision of interconnection, writing: “We can no longer view ourselves and our minds as the private, self-contained workings of an individual brain: we are oneness having the experience of separateness.” Opting for either Dionysus or Apollo is choosing the easy way out; the challenge is to maintain the balance between the two." Despite these claims of a spiritual vision, some have found her work shockingly sensual with one writer describing her figures as "a cross between the androgynous representatives of some future race and the randy hippies of Alex Comfort's Joy of Sex".

== Reception ==
Kjøk's work has received numerous accolades from critics. The prominent American critic Donald Kuspit praised her, saying, "Sol Kjok's figures – male and female nudes – are exquisitely drawn, often down to the least detail of their muscular flesh and expressive faces, indicating that she is not only a master draftsperson but a student of the human condition." […] "Certain passages of Swirling are sheer linear ecstasy – Kjøk seems to delight in the act of drawing itself, not simply in describing the figure."

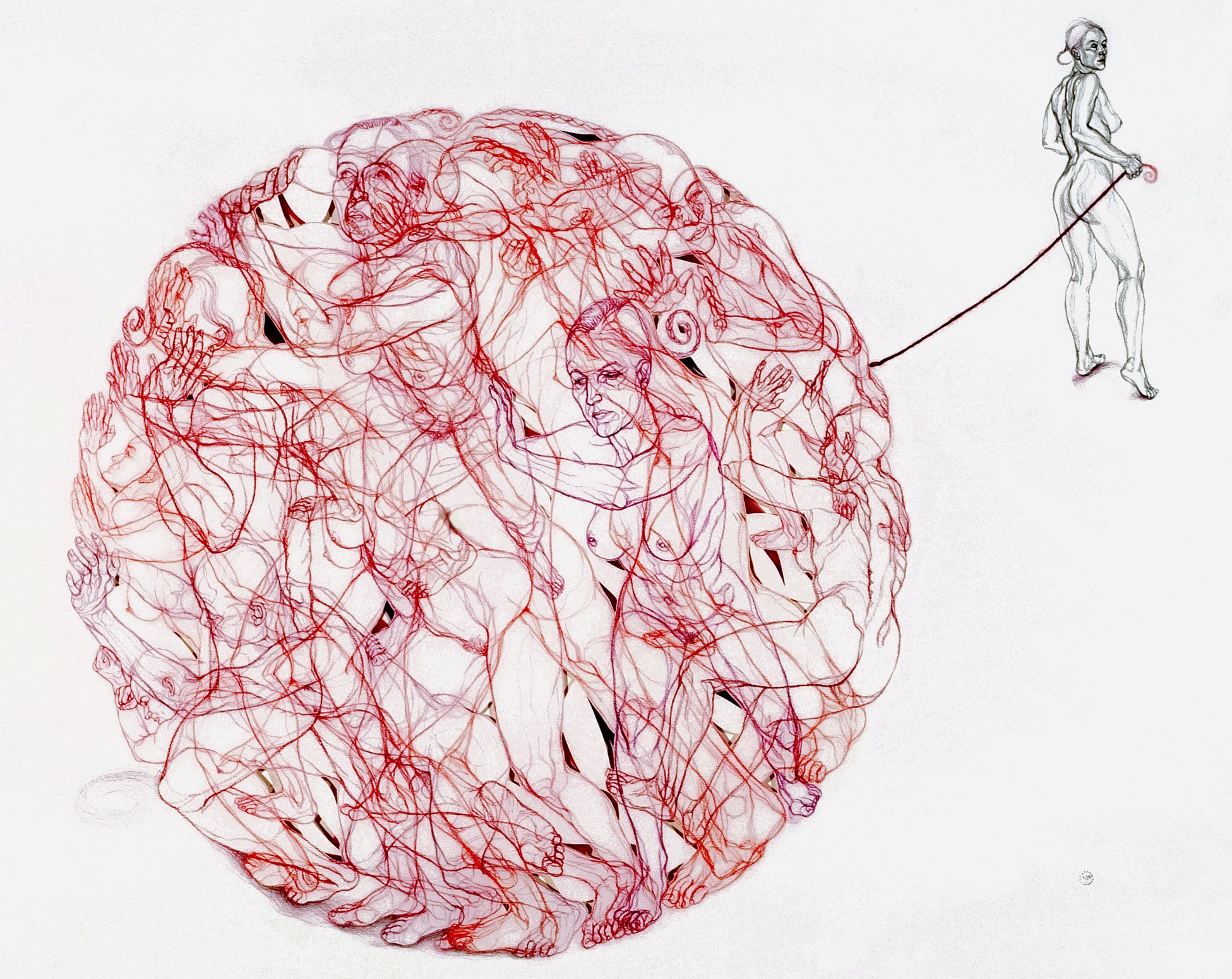
Push and Pull, 2013

New York Times art critic D. Dominick Lombardi wrote admiringly, "Sol Kjøk's art is playful and energetic.... Then there is a universal strength; a pleasure, a movement in her art that is clear and profound. It is obvious if you spend any time with her creations: Kjøk loves what she is doing. A feeling that emanates through every line, every form, every expression she records with obsessive precision..."

Swedish writer Britte Montigny said, "It is expertly done. So dazzlingly accomplished that you all but miss the fact that Sol Kjøk's work also holds existential questions with a full range of feelings, spanning from safety-seeking anxiety and fear, to protective love and joy of life."

In NYArts, Helmer Lång wrote "This makes for a kind of conceptual art where the artist directs the action, in such a way that the result reads both dramatic and mystifying. The viewer constantly feels that there is much more to this than a simple juggling with the organic forms of the human body; there are also symbolic accents and even a philosophy of life."

== Selected exhibitions ==
=== Solo ===
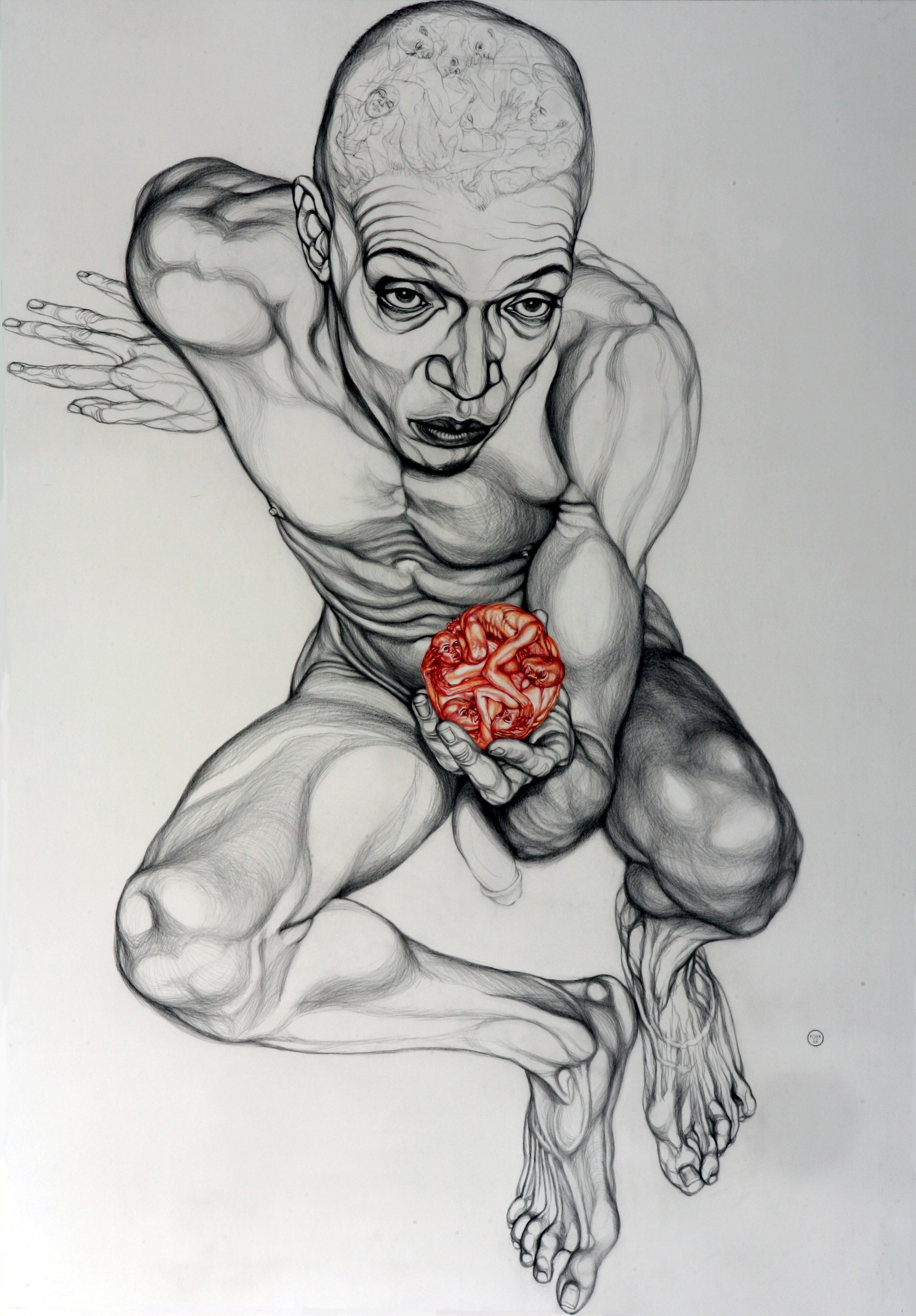
Waiting for the Sun, 2008

- 1996 Allegro Non Troppo. Brodie Gallery, Cincinnati, OH
- 2001 Swirling. Tegnerforbundet Galleri, Oslo
- 2005 Perlestrenger. Galleri 27, Oslo
- 2006 Strings of Beads. Manifest Gallery, Cincinnati, OH
- 2006 Swift and Slow. Nordic Heritage Museum, Seattle
- 2008 Book of Swells. The Nordic Museum of Drawing (Teckningsmuseet), Sweden
- 2009 Entre Sol et Ciel. Kunsthaus Tacheles, Berlin
- 2013 A Red Song in the Night. Galleri Ramfjord, Oslo

=== Two-person shows ===
- 2005 Skeins & Veins w. Håvard Homstvedt. Samuel S.T. Chen Fine Arts Center, CT
- 2006 The Human Form Dominates w. Boris Zakic, Manifest Gallery, Cincinnati, Ohio
- 2010 Un-Interrupted w. Erica Schreiner. Bill Hodges Gallery, NYC
- 2012 And the World Cracked Open with Anki King, NOoSPHERE Arts, NYC
- 2014 IN THE AIR w. Peter Max-Jakobsen, Galleri Oxholm, Copenhagen
- 2016 IN THE AIR with Peter Max-Jakobsen, Denise Bibro Fine Arts, New York

=== Group ===
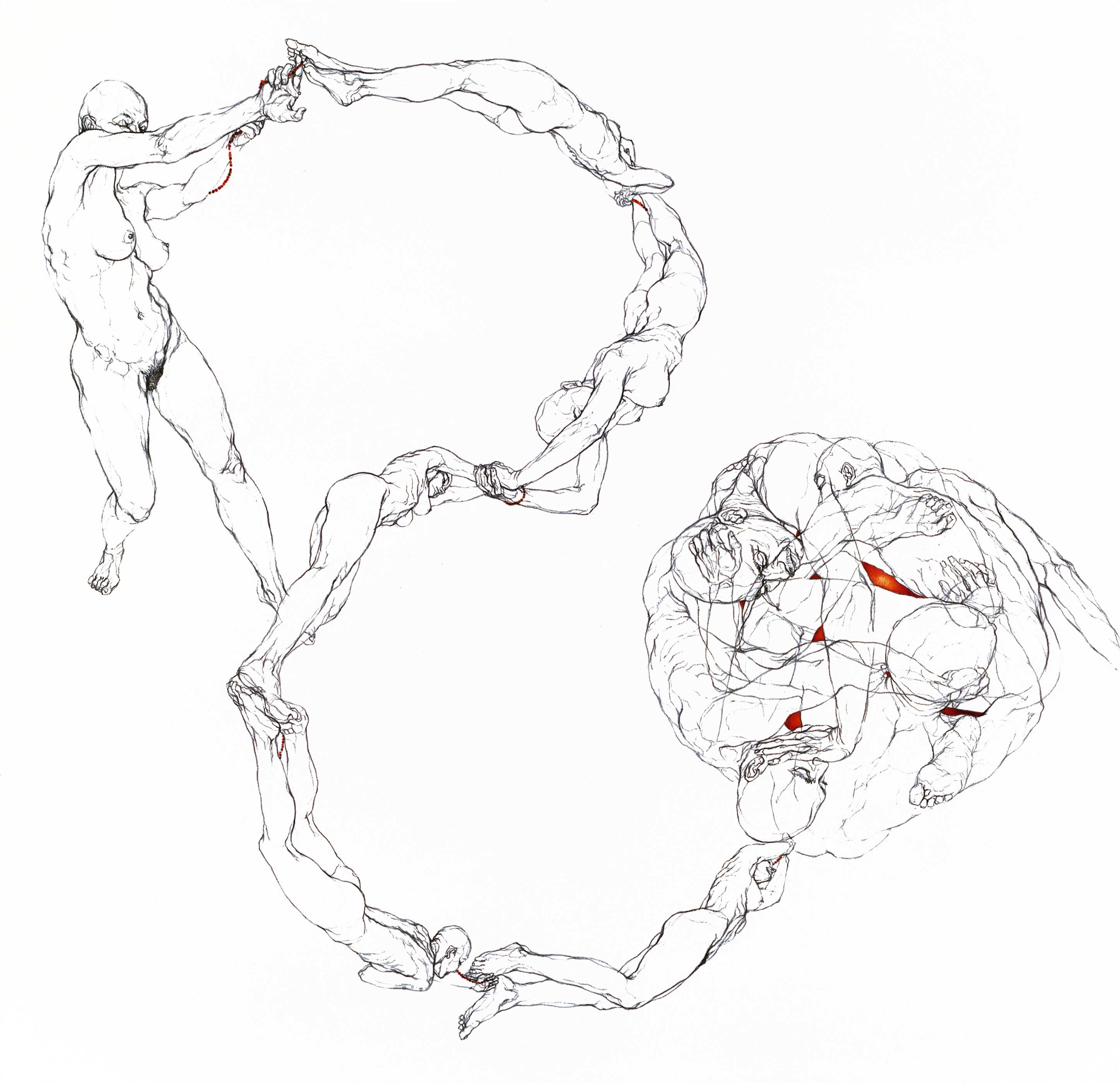
Unfurling, 2008. Permanent wall drawing at Teckningsmuseet i Laholm, Sweden

- 1996 Contemporary Realism. Juried by Sidney Goodman. Gallery Alexy, Philadelphia
- 1998 Realism III. Juried by Sidney Goodman. CCC/Gallery Alexy, Philadelphia
- 2000 Survey of Women Artists at the Millennium. A.I.R. Gallery, NYC.
- 2001 International Show. Juried by Donald B. Kuspit. Visual Arts Center of New Jersey
- 2001 New Space – New Audience. CAA College Art Association 2001 Chicago.
- 2001 Figurative Explorations. Goldstrom Gallery, NYC
- 2001 Current Trends. Galleri Steen, Oslo, Norway
- 2002 Hopscotch: Associative Leaps in the Construction of Narrative. Painted Bride Art Center, Philadelphia, PA
- 2002 Virtual Memorial. Le Musée Divisioniste, Cologne, Germany
- 2004 Identity Channel. National Museum of Contemporary Art (Romania)
- 2004 Festival Mira! Lubolo*. Casa de America, Madrid, Spain
- 2004 Norwegian Artists in New York. Trygve Lie Gallery, NYC
- 2005 Terrestrial Domains. Manifest Gallery, Cincinnati, OH
- 2005 American Drawing Biennial. Muscarelle Museum of Art, VA
- 2005 Working Artists in Brooklyn. Romo Gallery, Atlanta, GA
- 2006 One Year Later. Romo Gallery, Atlanta, GA
- 2006 Square Root of Drawing. Temple Bar Gallery and Studios, Dublin
- 2007 Her-Humanity:Transformative Agency. Casa Frela, NYC
- 2007 Remembering Ruth. Noho Gallery, NYC
- 2008 The Body as Image. The Philoctetes Center, NYC
- 2009 Paper Design The Artcomplex Center of Tokyo, Japan
- 2009 Manu Propria:Tallinn Drawing Triennial. Tallinn Art Hall, Kumu (museum) & other venues
- 2009 London International Creative Award. Soho Theatre, London
- 2009 DARKNESS DESCENDS: Norwegian Art Now. Traveling Show Chashama/Grossman Gallery, NYC+PA
- 2009 A Book about Death. Emily Harvey Foundation Gallery, NYC
- 2010 International Selection by Lee Sun-Don, X-Power Gallery, Taipei, Taiwan .
- 2010 Winter Salon, Elga Wimmer Gallery, NYC
- 2011 Nothing to Declare Jorge B. Vargas Museum & Filipiniana Research Center, Manila, Philippines
- 2012 Voice of Drawing, Hobusepea Gallery, Tallinn
- 2013 A House Full of Friends, NOoSPHERE Arts, NYC
- 2013 I Am My World. NO Gallery, NYC
- 2014 Salon d'Automne Juried Show, Grand Palais, Champs-Elysées Paris
- 2015 Kitchen Girls & Toy Boys curated by Jonny Star, Rush Arts Gallery, NYC
- 2015 You Can Feel It, Haus am Lutzowplatz, Berlin
- 2015 New Silk Road, Shaanxi Province Art Museum, Xi'an, China

== Works in museums and public collections ==
- Cincinnati Art Museum, OH
- The Nordic Museum of Drawing (Teckningsmuseet), Laholm, Sweden
- Osten Museum of Drawings, Skopje, Republic of Macedonia
- Broadway Stages, New York City
- The Kinsey Institute, IN
- Kunsthaus Tacheles, Berlin
- Shaanxi Province Art Museum, X’ian, China
