= School of Architecture and Interior Design =

University of Cincinnati unit

The School of Architecture and Interior Design (SAID) is a part of the College of Design, Architecture, Art and Planning (DAAP) at the University of Cincinnati. It is located within the Aronoff Center for the Arts in the university's main campus in Cincinnati, Ohio.

== History ==
The School of Architecture and Interior Design was founded in 1869 at McMicken University. By 1875 the school's offerings expanded to include history, design, and drawing. The architecture coursework did not survive the transfer of programs to the Cincinnati Art Museum Association in 1884, but it established a pattern of architectural education that re-emerged fifty years later.

Cooperative education began with Dean Herman Schneider in 1906, and it remains a core component of the undergraduate and graduate programs in SAID. Alternating semesters of academics and professional experience provide an opportunity to link theory and practice in architecture and design. Operating within a 700-firm employer network, students establish professional learning objectives and identify supervisors to create supportive learning environments. Students do not pay full tuition during co-op terms, only a minimal co-op fee, and can expect to receive hourly compensation or monthly stipends. Architecture students working toward registration may earn Intern Development Program (IDP) hours through co-op experiences.

In 1946, Ernest Picerking, the newly appointed Dean of the College of Applied Arts, could direct the college and architecture division separately from the College of Engineering with sole allegiance to the maintenance and development of applied arts. That year, the college adopted a six-year academic/co-op plan for architecture to meet ACSA accreditation standards. In 1960, the College of Applied Arts was renamed the College of Design, Architecture, and Art (DAA); the college later reorganized to recognize the School of Planning as a distinct school, changing the name to DAAP.

Dean Bert Berenson, appointed in 1975, reorganized the college into the schools that exist today. The creation of the School of Architecture and Interior Design initially created controversy, as many thought architecture would overshadow interior design. However, both tracks continue to flourish.

== Degrees Offered ==
=== Bachelor of Science in Architecture (BS Arch) ===
The four-year, pre-professional Bachelor of Science in Architecture degree teaches collaborative design and the technical part of architecture. It also includes approximately one year of co-op education.

=== Bachelor of Science in Interior Design (BS ID) ===
The five-year Bachelor of Science in Interior Design degree concerns itself with interior design, and includes approximately one and a half years of co-op education.

=== Master of Architecture (M Arch) ===
The professional Master of Architecture degree provides two curricular options: one is for students with a bachelor's degree in other fields (M Arch 1, four years); the other supports those who currently hold undergraduate degrees in architecture (M Arch 2, three years). The three- or four-year program includes approximately one year of co-op education and culminates with a thesis research and design project.

=== Master of Science Architecture (MS Arch) ===
The two-year, post-professional Master of Science in Architecture is usually best suited for those who have completed a professional bachelor's degree or those who have strong backgrounds in other fields and whose interest in architecture is of a theoretical or investigative nature.

=== PhD in Architecture ===
The PhD in Architecture includes education on specific styles of architecture, as well as sustainable design and preservation of historic buildings. The first two years include core curriculum, the third year involves exams and a dissertation proposal, and the fourth and fifth years contain dissertation research and writing.

== Facilities ==
SAID is housed in a complex of four buildings, the most recent of which was designed by Peter Eisenman and completed in 1996. The complex includes many in-house services targeted to architecture and design students, including:

- Computer Graphics Center (CGC): contains two computer labs (one operational 24/7) with Mac and Windows operating systems; provides a help desk; and contains printing, plotting, and scanning services
- Rapid Prototyping Center (RPC): home to several CNC machines, three dimensional printers, and laser cutters
- Student Technology Lab (STL): a student run and operated sub-facility of the RPC which houses one Tormach CNC machine, PRUSA three dimensional printers, and Rabbit laser cutters
- Workshop: contains wood and metal working machines
- Photo Lab: provides dark rooms and shooting studios
- Library: one of the university's fourteen libraries, the DAAP library includes oversize and reference stacks; periodicals and bound journals; a visual resources center with scanners, slide scanners, and light tables; group study facilities; and a learning lounge
- DAAP Store and DAAP Cafe

== Notable alumni ==
- Michael Graves ('58): member of the New York Five; Robert Schirmer Professor of Architecture Emeritus at Princeton University; director of Michael Graves & Associates, practicing architecture and industrial design; cited by Paul Goldberger of the New York Times as "the most truly original voice American architecture has produced in some time"
- John Hejduk (studied for two years, '50-'52): member of the New York Five; established his own practice in New York; professor (1964-2000) and Dean (1975-2000) of the School of Architecture at Cooper Union
- Eva Maddox ('66): Design Principal of Branded Environments for Perkins + Will, Chicago; named by Fast Company as one of the "change agents... designers, and dreamers who are creating your future;" Chicago Magazine's 2002 Chicagoan of the Year; two-time Purpose Prize winner; member of the Interior Design Hall of Fame
- Erik Sueberkrop ('72): Founding Principal of STUDIOS Architecture in 1985, later leading the establishment of the firm's London, Paris, and Los Angeles offices; won the 2002 Chicago Athenaeum American Architecture Award for the design of UC's CARE/Crawley building
- Kevin Roche ('75): Principal of Roche Design Strategy; an internationally recognized interior designer who leads consultancies related to merchandising and strategic planning; previous positions include CEO of Fitch Worldwide, president and CEO of FRCH Design Worldwide, and senior vice president of DFS Group/LVMH
- Richard Blinder ('59): Founding Partner of Beyer Blinder Belle; champion of historic preservation, leading the renovation of projects like New York City's Grand Central Station, Ellis Island, and Ford Center for the Performing Arts on Broadway
- James Prendergast ('84), Partner of Goettsch Partners, leading the interior architecture practice; previously served as vice president and principal at Perkins + Will
- John Senhauser ('71): Founder of John Senhauser Architects; received 1999 Ohio Gold Medal Firm Award and the 2009 AIA Ohio Gold Medal; previously served as President of both AIA Ohio and AIA Cincinnati and Secretary of AIA National; Director of NAAB 2007-2010
