= Cooper Chemical Company =

American specialty manufacturing company

- Type: Private
- Founded: 1857
- Founder: Charles Cooper; Jacob Kleinhans
- Headquarters: Long Valley, New Jersey
- Website: cooperchemical.com

Cooper Chemical Company is an American chemical manufacturing firm that has operated since 1857. The roots of the company were planted in the Iron Bound section (Clifford and Van Buren Streets) of Newark, New Jersey, by Charles Cooper and Jacob Kleinhans. Originally called Charles Cooper & Co., the company developed chemicals, additives, paints, and other materials for US consumers and industries. The main business office was located on Worth Street near Chatham Square in New York City.

Cooper Chemical Company is still in bulk specialty chemical manufacturing. The product line provides material to the US government and pharmaceutical companies throughout the world.
