= West Chicago City Museum =

- Turner Town Hall
- U.S. National Register of Historic Places
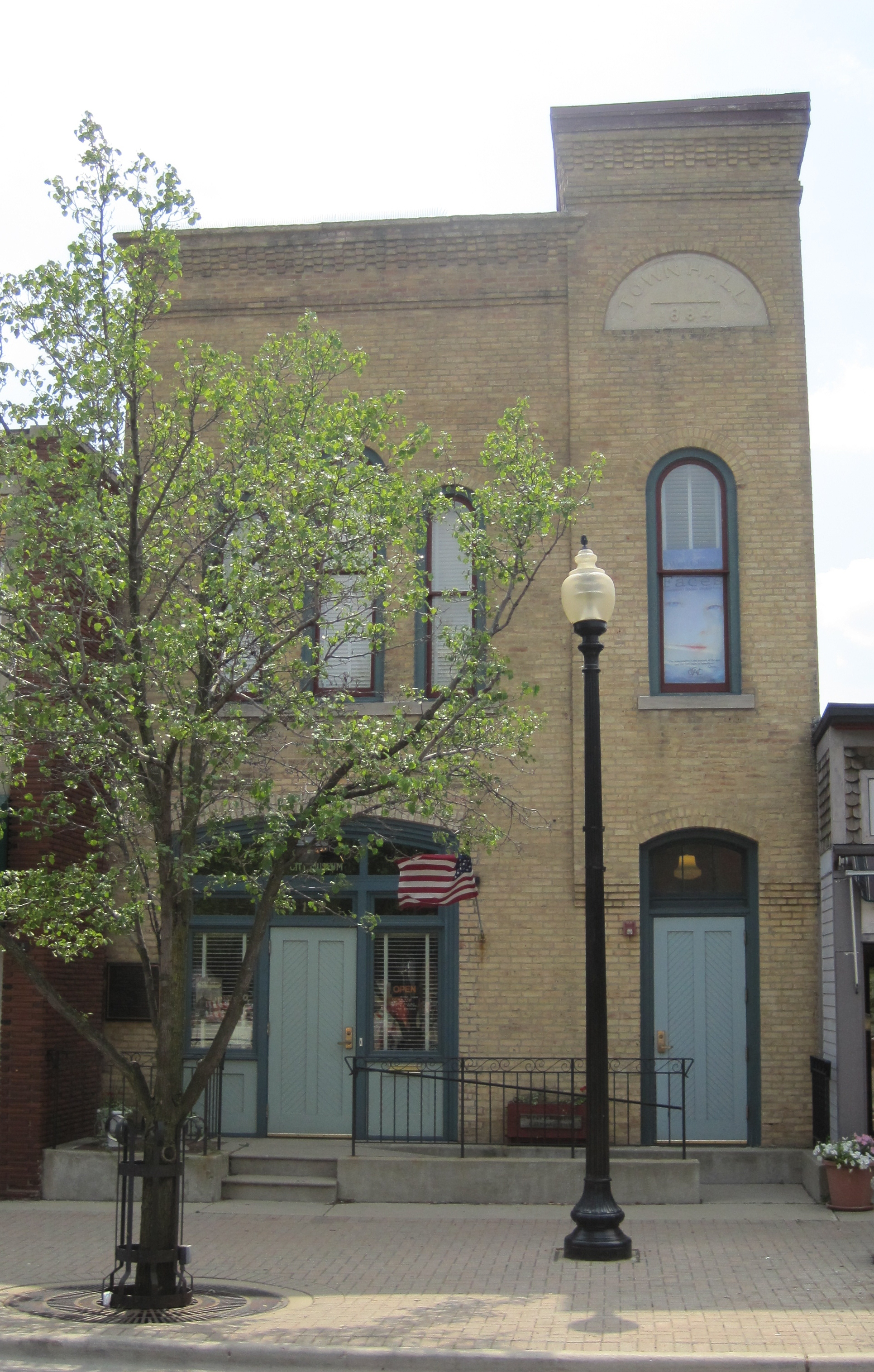

- Location within Illinois Location within the United States
- Location: 132 Main St. West Chicago, DuPage County, Illinois, U.S.
- Coordinates: 41°53′1″N 88°12′15″W
- Built: 1884; 142 years ago
- Architectural style: Late Victorian & Italianate
- NRHP reference No.: 91000573
- Added to NRHP: May 13, 1991

The West Chicago City Museum, originally the Turner Town Hall, is a museum in West Chicago, Illinois.

== History ==
Turner Town Hall originally functioned as the first Village Hall of West Chicago, providing police and fire control services to the community. West Chicago was originally known as Junction, as three railroads crossed through it. The Galena and Chicago Union Railroad erected the first railway station in the town in 1849, and in five years' time, the town was an important railway maintenance stop. Working on steam engines and railway cars at the time induced a great fire hazard, but there was no city services to fight the blazes. All fire control was ineffectively provided by private companies.

In 1883, the village, now known as Turner, approved the construction of a Town Hall. Aside from its town safety functions, the hall also provided a meeting place for citizens of the village and hosted a local museum. Fire protection was officially added in 1888. The town hall maintained its functions until 1976 when it was re-designated the West Chicago City Museum. It was added to the National Register of Historic Places in 1991.

== Architecture ==
The two-story building is in the middle of a commercial block, though it was originally detached. It was built with a cream colored brick on a limestone foundation. The main facade faces northeast toward Main Street. This facade is asymmetrical due to its Italianate tower. The tower, which projects slightly from the facade, has a secondary entrance and a single round top window. The tower originally had a metal pyramidal roof, but this has since been removed. The main entrance on the body of the building was replaced in 1942 when barn doors (used by the fire station) were replaced with a set of Federal Style doors and windows. Three round top windows are found on the second floor.
