= Rare Earths Facility =

Coordinates: 41°52′23″N 88°12′30″W

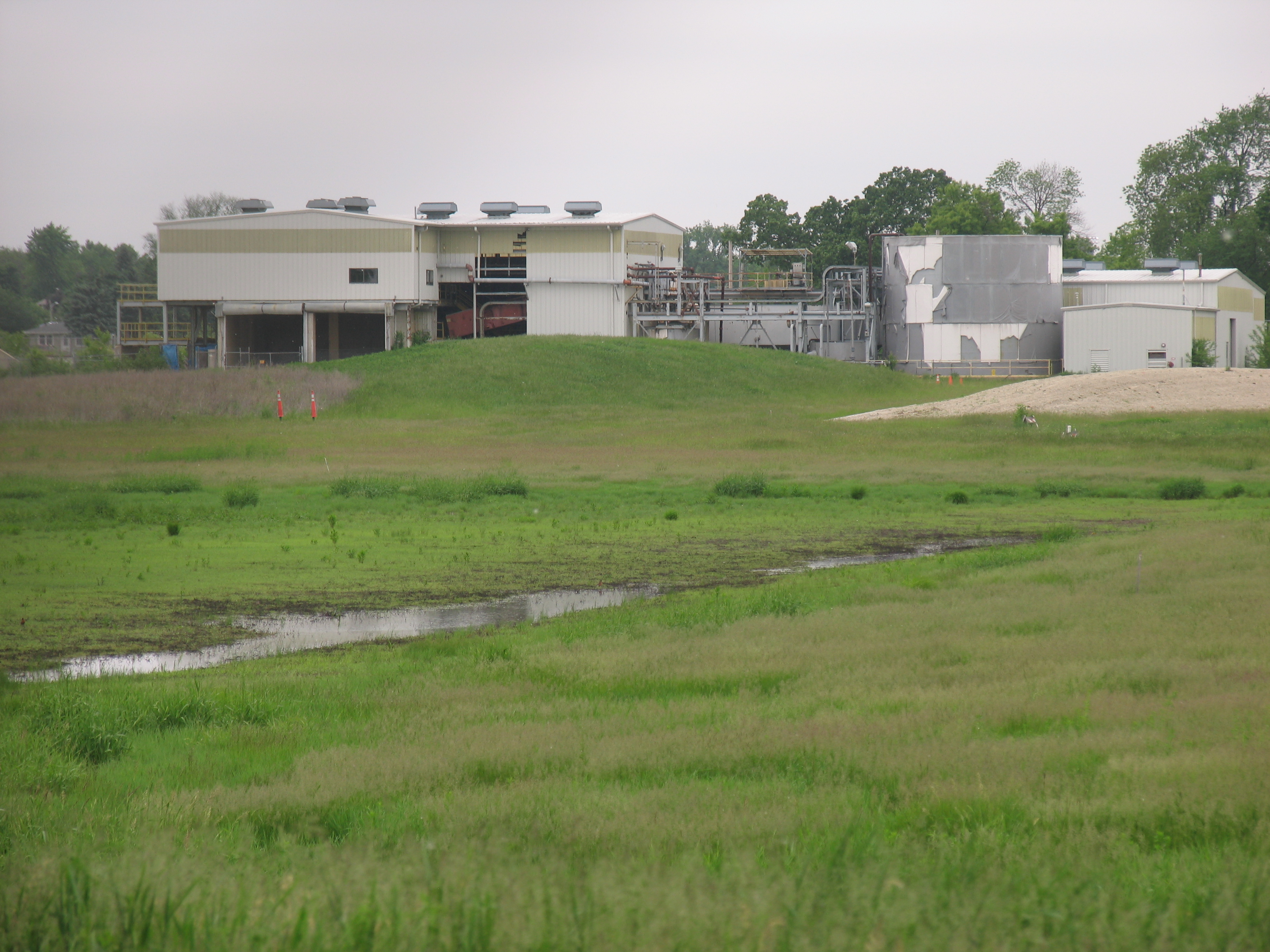
Buildings at the abandoned Rare Earths Facility (June 2013 photo)

The Rare Earths Facility was a production plant for various chemicals and metals including thorium, uranium, and radium. It was located in West Chicago, Illinois, USA.

== History ==
The site was opened in 1931 by the Lindsay Light and Chemical Company. It processed ores like monazite to produce elements, including thorium and uranium. It also made gaslight mantles, and during World War II, hydrofluoric acid.

In 1958, it became owned by American Potash and Chemical Company (AMPOT), which at one point had a 'Lindsay Chemical Division.'

In 1967, AMPOT, and thus the facility, were bought by Kerr-McGee. The Rare Earths Facility were closed by Kerr-McGee in 1973.

In 2005, KMCC was spun off from Kerr-McGee as Tronox, shortly before Kerr-McGee was acquired by Anadarko Petroleum. Tronox inherited responsibility for the Rare Earths Facility and other sites. Tronox went bankrupt in 2009 and shareholders sued Anadarko Petroleum, partly for having misled investors in Tronox about its environmental debts.

== Pollution ==
In the early years, people from the surrounding community used the mill tailings as fill dirt in various properties, such as their yards and gardens. A woman who played in such a yard as a child later sued Kerr-McGee over her Hodgkin's disease and settled out of court in 1988.

Radioactive waste from the plant was put in a local landfill that later became a public park called Reed-Keppler Park.

Kress Creek and West Branch Dupage River (including sediments, banks, and floodplains) were contaminated by years of rainwater runoff from REF going into a storm sewer and then into the creek. The floodplain includes people's yards.

The West Chicago Sewage Treatment Plant was contaminated when mill tailings from REF were used as fill dirt there. This also resulted in pollution of the West Branch Dupage River from runoff and erosion.

In 1991, the Illinois Department of Public Health found elevated cancer rates in the community.

== See also ==
- EnergySolutions
