= West Chicago, Illinois =

West Chicago, Illinois Turner Junction
- City
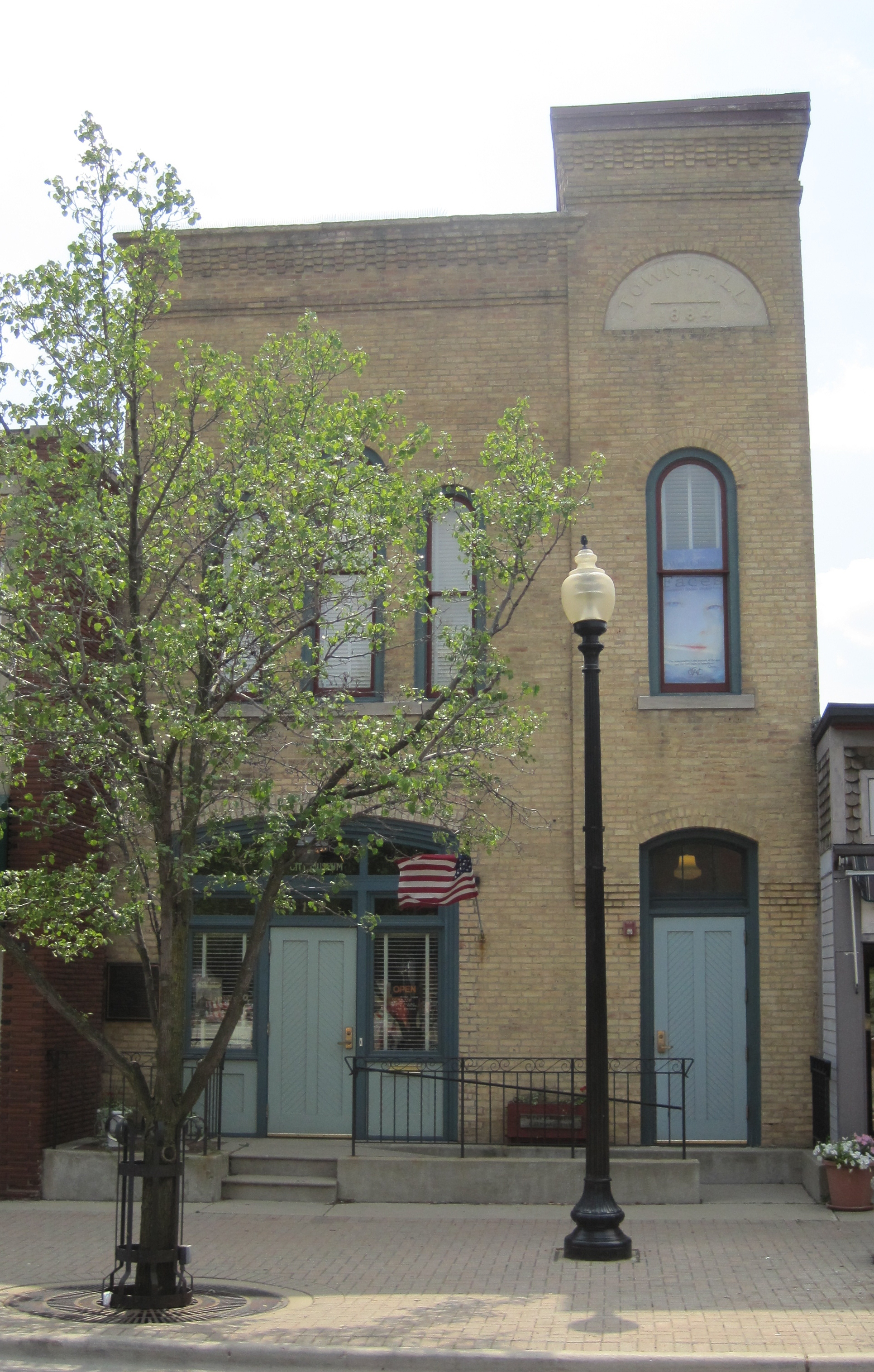
- Turner Hall in West Chicago

- Flag Seal
- Motto: "Where History and Progress meet..."
- Location of West Chicago in DuPage County, Illinois.
- Coordinates: 41°53′18″N 88°14′35″W
- Country: United States
- State: Illinois
- County: DuPage
- Townships: Winfield, Wayne
- Incorporated: May 31, 1873

Government
  - Type: Mayor–council

Area
  - Total: 15.72 sq mi (40.71 km^{2})
  - Land: 15.37 sq mi (39.82 km^{2})
  - Water: 0.34 sq mi (0.89 km^{2}) 2.25%
- Elevation: 755 ft (230 m)

Population (2020)
  - Total: 25,614
  - Density: 1,666/sq mi (643.3/km^{2})

Standard of living
  - Per capita income: $19,287 (median: $63,424)
  - Home value: $192,993 (median: $160,200)
- Time zone: UTC-6 (CST)
  - Summer (DST): UTC-5 (CDT)
- ZIP codes: 60185, 60186
- Area code(s): 630 and 331
- FIPS code: 17-80060
- GNIS feature ID: 2397264
- Website: www.westchicago.org

West Chicago is a city in DuPage County, Illinois, United States. The population was 25,614 at the 2020 census. It was formerly named Junction and later Turner, after its founder, John Bice Turner, president of the Galena and Chicago Union Railroad (G&CU) in 1855. The city was initially established around the first junction of railroad lines in Illinois, and today is still served by the Union Pacific West Metra service via West Chicago station.

== History ==
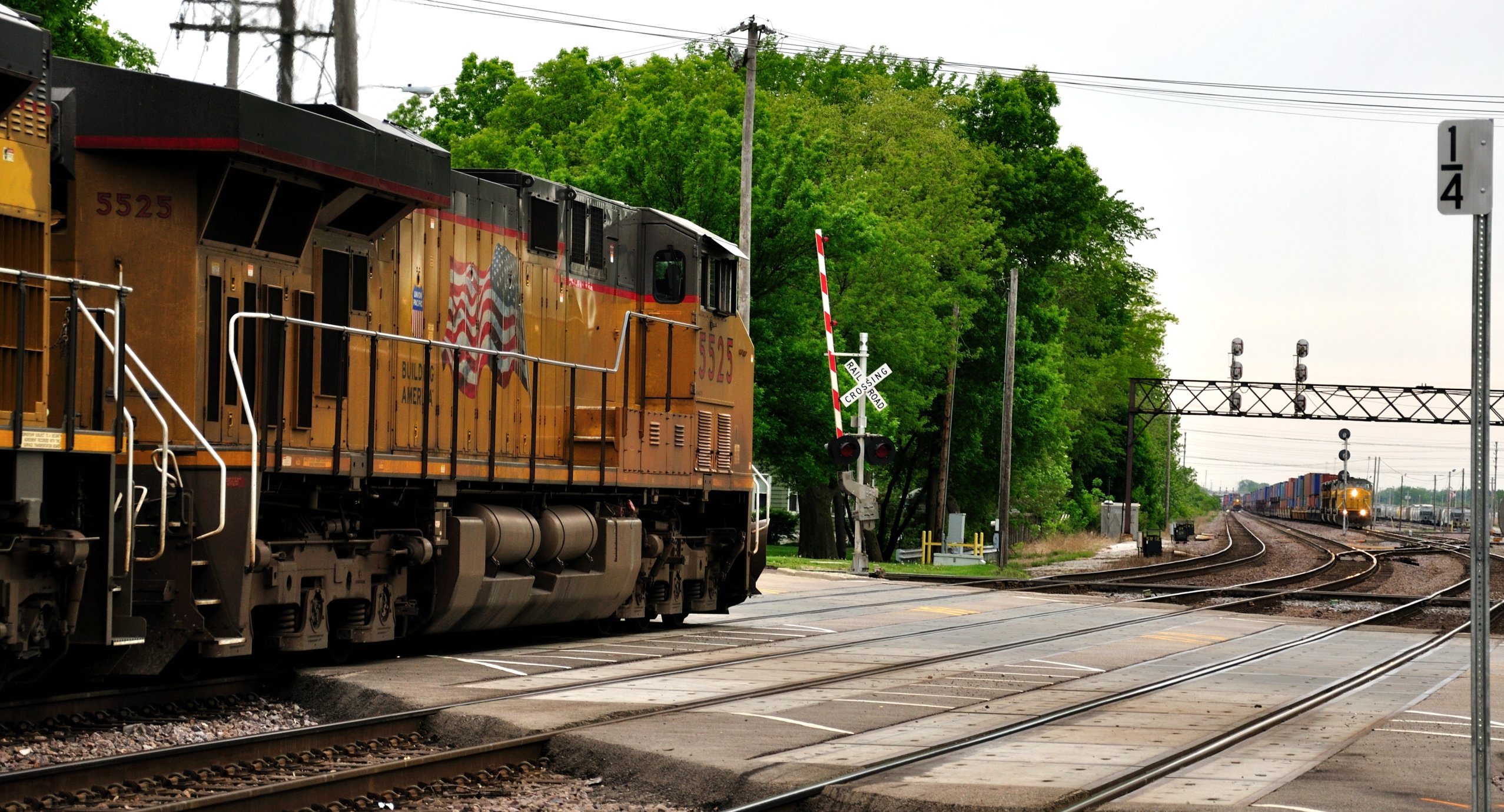
A railroad crossing at West Chicago.

Erastus Gary, of Pomfret, Connecticut, homesteaded 760 acres (310 ha) on the banks of the DuPage River, just south of West Chicago's present day city limits in the 1830s. His son became "Judge" Elbert Henry Gary, the first CEO of America's first billion-dollar corporation, U.S. Steel, and for whom Gary, Indiana, is named. Gary also helped bring brothers Jesse and Warren Wheaton, founders of nearby Wheaton, Illinois, the DuPage County seat, from Connecticut to the Midwest. A pioneer cemetery on the old Gary Homestead, where a sawmill had been built by the Garys, just north of Gary's Mill Road, and north of its terminus at Illinois Route 59, was built over with apartment buildings in the 1960s.

In 1849, the Galena and Chicago Union Railroad (predecessor of the C&NW) reached the site of present-day West Chicago, then continued northwest to Elgin. In 1850, the Aurora Branch Railroad (predecessor of the CB&Q) built southwest, making America's first railroad junction point west of Chicago. In 1854, the G&CURR opened the “Dixon Air Line” branch West thru Geneva.

Because of the number of trains passing through town, water and fuel facilities for locomotives and a roundhouse were built here, as well as an early eating-house and hotel for travelers. As a result, a number of new employees and their families located to this community. The original settlers were primarily English and Irish, with Germans arriving in the 1860s and Mexican immigrants by the 1910s. John B. Turner, president of the G&CU and a resident of Chicago, owned several acres of land in what is now the center of town. As more people settled in Junction, Turner recognized the chance to make a profit by platting his land and selling off lots. He therefore recorded the community's first plat in 1855 under the name of Town of Junction.

The community continued its growth, although the one-room schoolhouse built a mile outside town in 1835 would become the state's last surviving one-room schoolhouse when it closed in 1991. Meanwhile, in 1857, Dr. Joseph McConnell and his wife Mary platted a second portion of town just north of John B. Turner's plat. They recorded their plat as the Town of Turner in honor of the railroad president. These two “towns” became informally known as Turner Junction.

By 1873, the community had taken on a substantial and permanent character, so the residents incorporated as the Village of Turner. In 1888, a new railroad, the Elgin, Joliet & Eastern, built a freight line through town. It offered free factory sites for any industry willing to locate along its right-of-way. As part of the effort to attract industry, the community changed its name in 1896 to the Village of West Chicago. Area businessmen, particularly Charles Bolles, reasoned that the new name sounded more cosmopolitan, and would help draw prospective factory owners.

As industry located in West Chicago and new jobs opened up, the population increased. At the turn of the century, West Chicago was number two in population in DuPage County, behind Hinsdale. By 1910, the population was 2,378 and several new industries had located here, including the Borden's milk condensing plant, the Turner Cabinet Company and the Turner Brick Company. The community continues to attract quality business and residential development that contributes to the culturally diverse community that exists today.

In 1909, one more railroad came to West Chicago. The Chicago, Wheaton and Western Railway, a lightly built interurban electric railway, came in from the east, running down the middle of Junction and Depot (now both Main) streets, then curved back west toward Geneva. Soon bought by the Chicago Aurora and Elgin Railroad, the “country trolley” was lightly used, and abandoned in 1937. The right of way is now the Geneva Spur of the Illinois Prairie Path.

In the 1980s and 1990s, the city residents uncovered a nuclear-waste contamination problem. Harmful waste from the Rare Earths Facility had been spread around the community since the 1930s, when the Lindsay Light and Chemical Company built a plant. Reed-Keppler Park was built on top of a landfill that had received some waste from the plant. Kerr-McGee, which had bought the facility in 1967 and operated it until 1973, settled with the city and cleaned up the waste.

The movie Reach the Rock, written by John Hughes, was filmed in downtown West Chicago in 1998.

== Geography ==
According to the 2021 census gazetteer files, West Chicago has a total area of 15.72 square miles (40.71 km^{2}), of which 15.38 square miles (39.83 km^{2}) (or 97.82%) is land and 0.34 square miles (0.88 km^{2}) (or 2.18%) is water.

== Demographics ==
Historical population
Census	Pop.	Note	%±
1880	1,001		—
1890	1,506		50.4%
1900	1,877		24.6%
1910	2,378		26.7%
1920	2,594		9.1%
1930	3,477		34.0%
1940	3,355		−3.5%
1950	3,973		18.4%
1960	6,854		72.5%
1970	9,988		45.7%
1980	12,550		25.7%
1990	14,796		17.9%
2000	23,469		58.6%
2010	27,086		15.4%
2020	25,614		−5.4%
U.S. Decennial Census

=== Racial and ethnic composition ===
West Chicago city, Illinois – Racial and ethnic composition Note: the US Census treats Hispanic/Latino as an ethnic category. This table excludes Latinos from the racial categories and assigns them to a separate category. Hispanics/Latinos may be of any race.
Race / Ethnicity (NH = Non-Hispanic)	Pop 2000	Pop 2010	Pop 2020	% 2000	% 2010	% 2020
White alone (NH)	11,052	10,770	8,906	47.09%	39.76%	34.77%
Black or African American alone (NH)	326	580	701	1.39%	2.14%	2.74%
Native American or Alaska Native alone (NH)	26	31	45	0.11%	0.11%	0.18%
Asian alone (NH)	448	1,584	2,028	1.91%	5.85%	7.92%
Pacific Islander alone (NH)	7	11	0	0.03%	0.04%	0.00%
Other race alone (NH)	17	14	103	0.07%	0.05%	0.40%
Mixed race or Multiracial (NH)	188	259	549	0.80%	0.96%	2.14%
Hispanic or Latino (any race)	11,405	13,837	13,282	48.60%	51.09%	51.85%
Total	23,469	27,086	25,614	100.00%	100.00%	100.00%

=== 2020 census ===
As of the 2020 census, West Chicago had a population of 25,614 and 6,035 families in 7,456 households. The population density was 1,629.49 inhabitants per square mile (629.15/km^{2}). The median age was 35.6 years. 26.5% of residents were under the age of 18 and 10.9% of residents were 65 years of age or older. For every 100 females there were 101.5 males, and for every 100 females age 18 and over there were 102.0 males age 18 and over.

99.9% of residents lived in urban areas, while 0.1% lived in rural areas.

There were 7,456 households in West Chicago, of which 43.7% had children under the age of 18 living in them. Of all households, 61.1% were married-couple households, 14.1% were households with a male householder and no spouse or partner present, and 18.8% were households with a female householder and no spouse or partner present. About 15.2% of all households were made up of individuals and 6.2% had someone living alone who was 65 years of age or older.

There were 7,801 housing units, of which 4.4% were vacant. Housing unit density was 496.28 per square mile (191.61/km^{2}). The homeowner vacancy rate was 1.0% and the rental vacancy rate was 7.0%.

Racial composition as of the 2020 census
Race	Number	Percent
White	10,500	41.0%
Black or African American	747	2.9%
American Indian and Alaska Native	559	2.2%
Asian	2,059	8.0%
Native Hawaiian and Other Pacific Islander	5	0.0%
Some other race	7,390	28.9%
Two or more races	4,354	17.0%
Hispanic or Latino (of any race)	13,282	51.9%

== Economy ==
Jel Sert has its corporate headquarters in West Chicago.

Ball Horticultural Company has its Worldwide Headquarters in West Chicago.

General Mills had a production facility in West Chicago until 2017.

=== Top employers ===
According to the city's 2017 Comprehensive Annual Financial Report, the top employers in the city are:

#	Employer	# of Employees
1	Jel Sert	1,000
2	West Chicago Elementary School District 33	585
3	Aspen Marketing Services	425
4	Ball Horticultural Company	425
5	InNocor Inc.	330
6	Mapei	285
7	Community High School District 94	244
8	OSI Industries	230
9	Sims Recycling Solutions	200
10	New Wincup Holdings	167
11	In The Swim	150
12	Menards	150
13	St. Andrews Golf & Country Club	150
14	Turtle Splash Water Park	150
15	Wood Glen Pavilion LLC	140

== Government ==
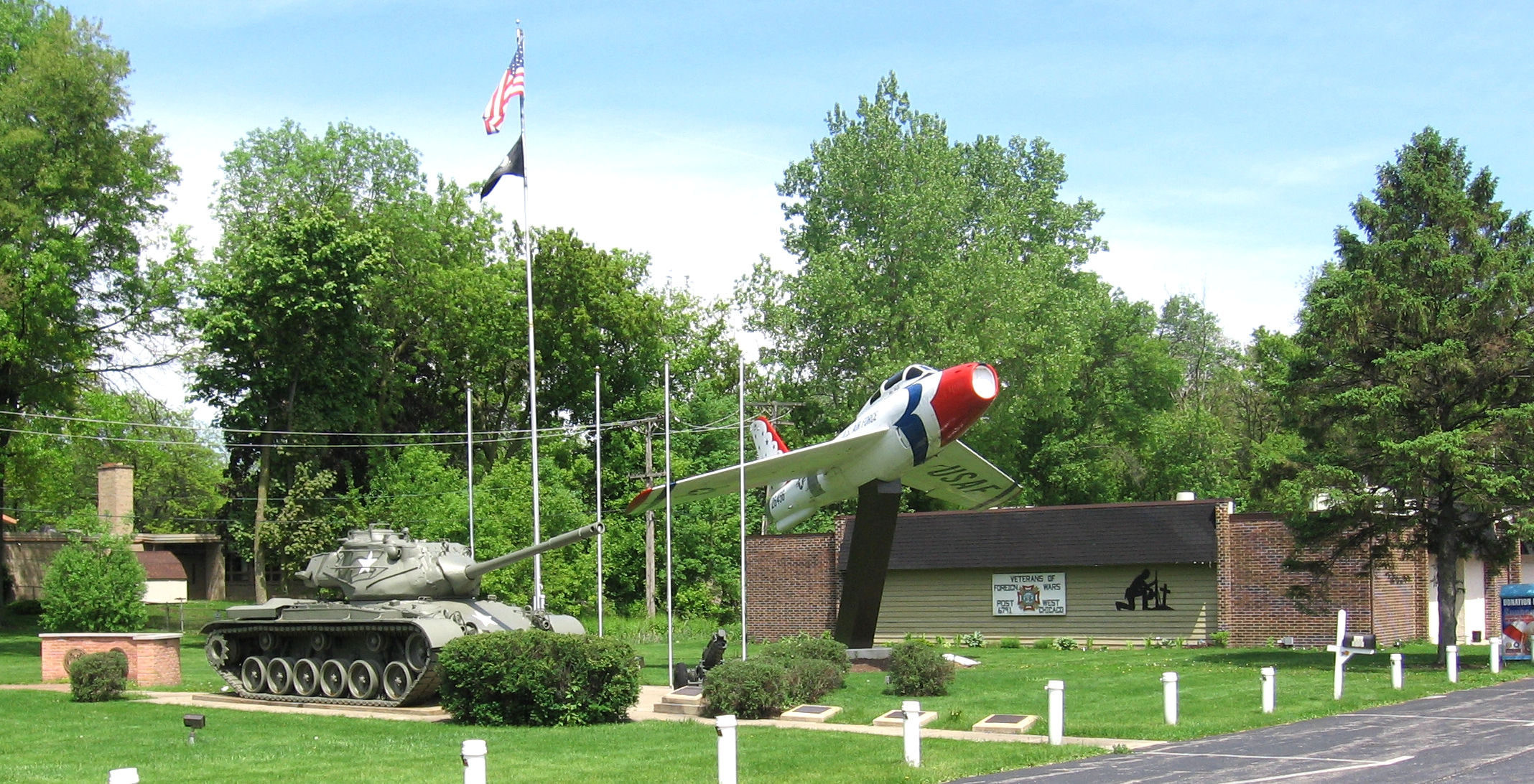
The Veterans of Foreign Wars, Post 6791, along Route 59 in West Chicago.

The United States Postal Service operates the West Chicago Post Office.

After winning election on April 1, 2025, Daniel Bovey was sworn in as mayor of West Chicago on May 5, 2025.

The city maintains the West Chicago Public Library downtown.

== Points of interest ==
West Chicago is home to the Truitt-Hoff Nature Preserve, part of DuPage County's West Chicago Prairie Forest Preserve, one of the largest and best preserved prairies in the Midwest. This prairie was discovered by then-mayor Richard Truitt in 1976 during one of his frequent walks in the open land west of the city. The prairie had been preserved because it was on railroad right-of-way land that had never been cultivated.

The city is also home to Kline Creek Farm, an 1890s living history farm. as well as the West Chicago City Museum, located in a historic building that once served as Town Hall.

== Infrastructure ==
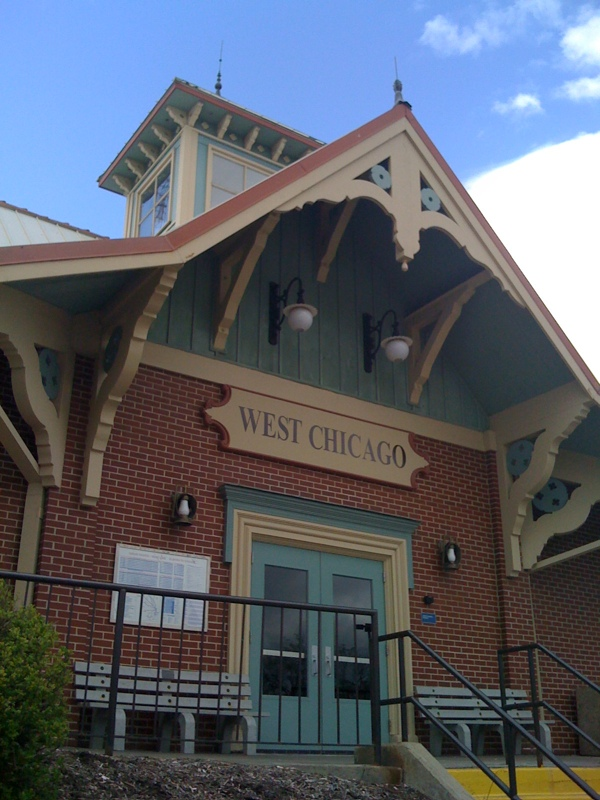
The Metra station

The DuPage Airport is located in the city. The National Transportation Safety Board (NTSB) operates the Chicago Aviation Field Office on the grounds of the airport; it is the regional headquarters of the NTSB Aviation Central Region.

Metra has a station on the Union Pacific West Line in town.

The eastern branch of the Great Western Trail passes through town.

== Education ==
The city of West Chicago has two high schools—one public school, West Chicago Community High School, and one private, Wheaton Academy. There is one preschool which is Pioneer and there are six public elementary schools (Currier, Wegner, Turner, Indian Knoll, Gary, and Norton Creek) and two middle schools [Benjamin and Leman Middle School (LMS)] within the city. The West Chicago Wildcats is the name of the WCCHS teams.

== Sister city ==
West Chicago has one sister city:

- Taufkirchen, Bavaria, Germany
