= System Wide Automated Network =

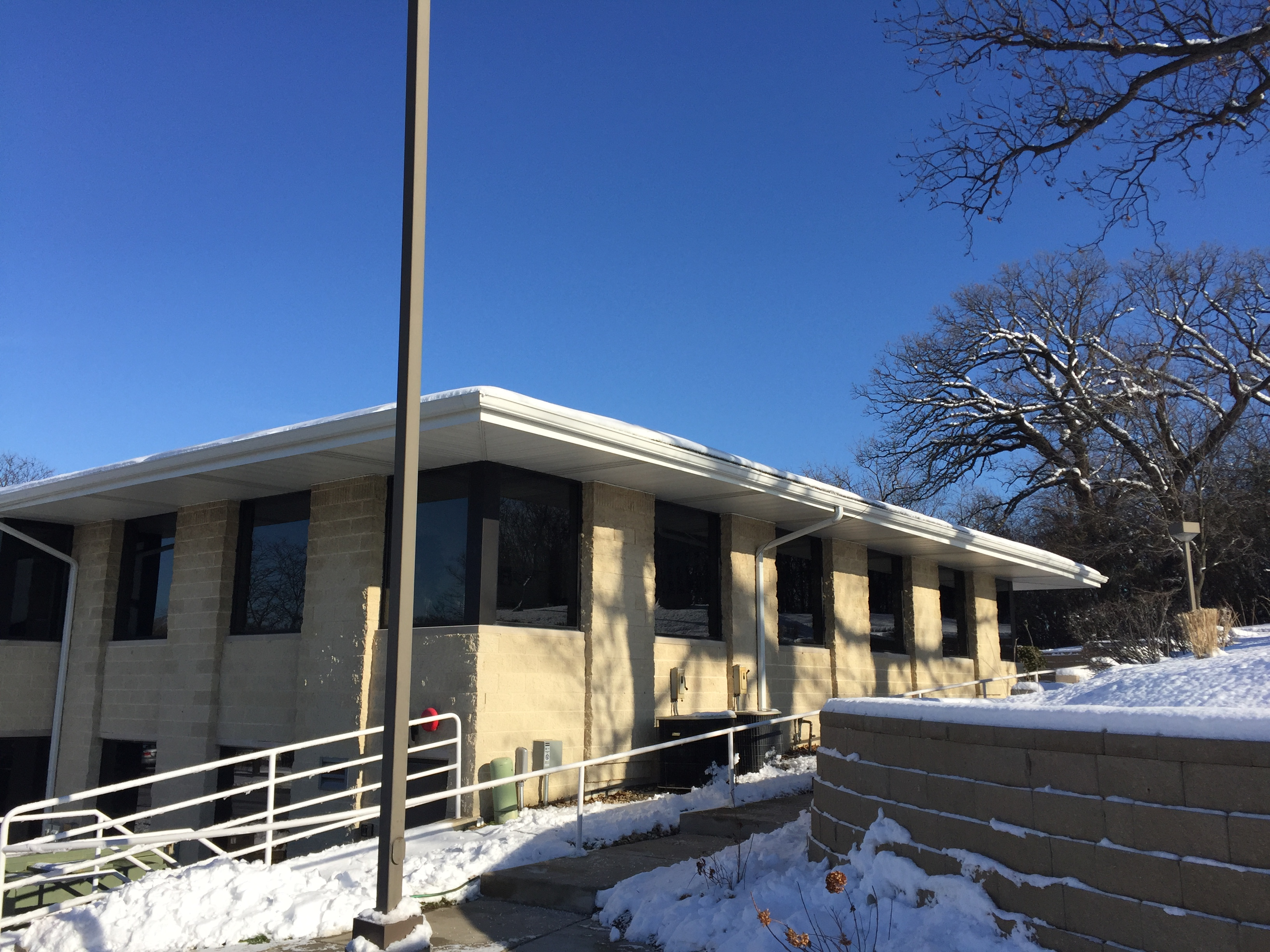
- Location: United States
- Established: 1974

Access and use
- Circulation: 13,500,000

Other information
- Budget: $2.5 million
- Director: Aaron Skog
- Employees: 20
- Website: https://www.swanlibraries.net

SWAN (System Wide Automated Network) is a multi-type library consortium that serves Illinois libraries. It was established in 1974. It has a membership of 97 libraries in the Chicago area, and provides service to 1 million registered library users. SWAN provides a shared online public access catalog with more than 8 million items available to patrons, with centralized cataloging and software services. SWAN is incorporated as an Illinois Intergovernmental Entity.

== Services ==
Libraries that are members of the SWAN library consortium add their cardholders to a central database with access to nearly 8 million items. Cardholders can also download and stream digital books, audiobooks, movies, and music through a collection of database subscriptions. Additional services include the following: centralized cataloging, text or email notification for items available or when they become overdue, and printed notices mailed directly to patrons. SWAN provides online video instruction to patrons and promotional material of its notification options. Libraries in SWAN have the ability to integrate purchasing of material through SWAN's integrated library system. SWAN is participating in a Linked Data project through Zepheira. This initiative is part of a BIBFRAME conversion of MARC21 data into a linked data website hosted by Zepheira.

== Governance ==
Member libraries elect seven library directors for three-year terms. The SWAN Board is responsible for governing and overseeing SWAN operations, including determining policies for the organization, employing an executive director, securing adequate funds for operations. Member libraries in SWAN through an intergovernmental agreement under the Illinois Cooperative Act agree to participate as members of the SWAN organization.
