= Eva Maddox =

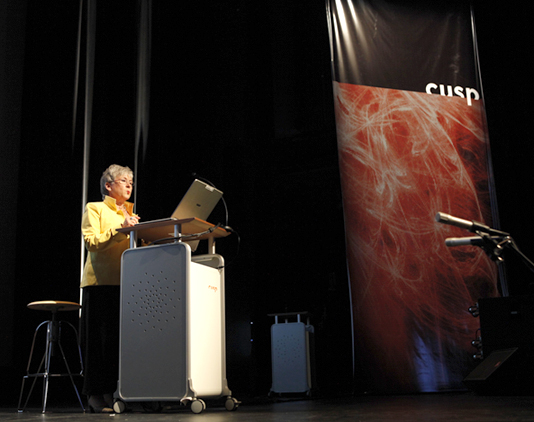
Eva Maddox presenting at Cusp Conference 2009, Chicago, IL

Eva L. Maddox is an American commercial interior designer. She has received over 100 awards and commendations over the course of her career. Maddox's early success in the design industry led her to open a design firm, Eva Maddox Associates.

Eva Maddox was born (1943) and raised in a small town in the middle of Tennessee, Viola, TN. She affirmed her love for design while attending the University of Cincinnati. She graduated in 1966, with a bachelor's degree, from the College of Design, Architecture, Art, and Planning. After graduating she worked in Cincinnati, at Space Design, while her husband Lynn Maddox was in graduate school. She moved to Indiana looking for other design opportunities. Space Design allowed her to create interior designs for any client she was able to find. She moved to Chicago, IL in 1970 and worked as a project director at Richmond, Manhoff + March, which was then one of the cities largest interior firms. Shortly after she took a position at an architecture firm, Meister & Volpe (1971). In 1992 she was inducted into the Interior Design Hall of Fame. In 1994 she cofounded Archeworks with architect Stanley Tigerman. Archeworks is a socially oriented design laboratory and multidisciplinary school. In 2002 she merged with Perkins + Will and became a design principle. On February 1, 2016 Maddox announced that she is retiring from Perkins + Will. Maddox will continue to work with Perkins+Will on special projects, but will devote most of her time to other pursuits. [9]

Upon earning her bachelor's degree in 1966, Maddox began her design career in Cincinnati, Ohio. She worked at an architecture firm, Space Design. She then moved to Indiana in attempt to find other design opportunities. While in Indiana Space Design allowed her to produce interior designs for any clients she could find. She moved to Chicago in 1970, and received a position as project director at Richmond, Manhoff, + March, which at the time was one of the largest interior firms in the city. During this time she wanted to reconnect with an architecture firm, in order to connect the interior design with the architectural structure. This led her to a position at Meister & Volpe in 1971. Due to the large volume of business that Maddox was producing at Meister & Volpe she decided to start her own business.

Maddox pioneered the concept of ‘Branded Environments’. Branded Environments is a research-based design approach that incorporated a client's DNA into the built environment. This approach helps to define how a company presents and represents itself.

Eva Maddox Associated was acquired by Perkins+Will in 2002. Maddox became design principal of the companies new Perkins+Will /Eva Maddox Branded Environments group. Maddox worked as design principal at Perkins+Will until she retired on February 1, 2016. Some of her most successful designs at Perkins+Will include Oak Park Public Library (2003), One Haworth Center (2008), and the Intrepid Sea, Air & Space Museum (2009).

== Archeworks ==
Eva Maddox co-founded Archeworks in 1994, along with architect Stanley Tigerman.

== Projects ==
Project	Location	Date	Square Footage	Awards/Certifications
Swedish Covenant Hospital	Chicago, Illinois	1997	185,000	Best Healthcare Facility, 1999 Contract Magazine Big "I" International Interior Awards Design Excellence Award, 1998 AIA Chicago Chapter Interior Design Award, 1998 IIDA
Oak Park Public Library	Oak Park, Illinois	2003	104,000	Signage & Environmental Graphics Category, 2005 American Corporate Identity Annual Corporate Office over 30,000 SF Category, 2004 ASID, Illinois Chapter
Haworth Chicago Showroom	Chicago, Illinois	2004	29,000	LEED Gold Certified Institute Honor Award for Interior Architecture, 2007 AIA Interior Design Award, Best of Competition, 2005 IIDA Showroom & Booth Design Competition/NeoCon Best of Show Award, 2004 IIDA
University of Cincinnati, Richard E. Lindner Center	Cincinnati, Ohio	2006	23,000	Interior Architecture Special Recognition, 2008 AIA /Chicago Chapter Big "I" International Interior Awards Sports/Entertainment Category, 2008 Contract Magazine First Place, Institutional Category, 2007 ASID, Illinois Chapter
Haworth Calgary Showroom and Learning Center	Calgary, Alberta	2007	23,000	LEED-CI Gold Certified Silver Award, Retail Design, 2009 Interior Designers Institute of British Columbia Awards of Excellence Program Honorable Mention, Retail Category, 2008, ASID, Illinois Chapter
One Haworth Center	Holland, Michigan	2008	300,000	LEED Gold Certified Good Design is Good Business Award, 2008 Business Week/Architectural Record
Intrepid Sea, Air & Space Museum	New York, New York	2009	39,000 (Main Hangar Deck)	Interior Architecture Citation of Merit, 2009 AIA, Chicago Chapter Honorable Mention, Institutional Category, 2009 ASID, Illinois Chapter

== Awards ==
Eva Maddox awards include Honor Awards from the National AIA and IIDA, and numerous Design Excellence Awards for Interior Architecture and Design from the local chapters of the AIA, ASID, SEGD and IIDA. Herawards include:

- 1992 inducted into the Interior Design Hall of Fame
- 1995 Crain’s Chicago Business- One of Chicago’s 100 most influential women
- 1999 inducted into the International Interior Design College of Fellows
- 2000 IIDA Star Award
- 2001 Chicago magazine Chicagoan of the Year
- 2002 Dean of Design Award
- 2006 honorary Doctorate of Fine Arts from the University of Cincinnati
- 2007, 2008 Purpose Prize Fellow
- 2011 Contract magazine's LEGEND Award
