= List of production companies owned by the American Broadcasting Company =

The American Broadcasting Company has formed a number of production companies since its formation in 1943 and under various parent companies and owners up until the present day under ownership by the Walt Disney Company. ABC Film Syndication, or ABC Films, was ABC's syndication distribution arm from 1953 to 1971 when the FCC passed the Financial Interest and Syndication Rules (best known simply as the fin-syn rules). As a result, ABC Films was sold to 5 of its former executives and changed name to Worldvision Enterprises. ABC's current primary production company is 20th Television.

A number of production companies were formed under Capital Cities/ABC Video Enterprises, Capital Cities/ABC Video Productions (both were reorganized and absorbed into ABC Cable and International Broadcast Group, which changed name to Disney Media Distribution in 2011 and currently Disney Platform Distribution since 2020 upon Capital Cities/ABC's merger with Disney), Ultra Entertainment, the Hemisphere Group and DIC Entertainment.

== Active ==
=== Greengrass Productions ===
Greengrass Productions, Inc.
- Type: Subsidiary
- Founded: 1992; 34 years ago
- Parent: ABC Entertainment

Greengrass Productions, Inc. is a production company of ABC Entertainment, a division of Disney Entertainment Television.

Greengrass Productions was incorporated in California on February 10, 1992. On June 7, 1996, due to the merger with Disney, Capital Cities/ABC indicated that its ABC Productions division operations would be shut down while keeping its boutique production companies: Victor Television Productions, ABC/Kane Productions, DIC Entertainment and Greengrass Productions. Greengrass was transferred from ABC Productions to ABC Entertainment.

==== Filmography ====
TV series

Title	Years	Co-production with	Notes
Police File	1992	Skyvision Entertainment and Grosso-Jacobson Entertainment	unaired TV pilot; co-production
Wild West C.O.W.-Boys of Moo Mesa	1992–1993	King World Productions, Gunther-Wahl Productions (season 1), Ruby-Spears Enterprises (season 2), Flextech Television and Mini Mountain Productions	Currently owned by WildBrain
Wild Palms	May 16–19, 1993		TV mini-series
Street Match	1993	Goldin-Sachs Entertainment Group	
Bump in the Night	1994–1995	Danger Productions	Currently owned by WildBrain
On Our Own	1994–1995	Lightkeeper Productions, de Passe Entertainment, Miller-Boyett Productions and Warner Bros. Television	
A Whole New Ballgame	1995	Bungalow 78 Productions and Universal Television	
Extreme	1995	Alan Barnette Productions and Universal Television	
Hypernauts	1996	DIC Entertainment	Currently owned by WildBrain
Champions of Magic	1996–1999		3 specials
Over the Top	1997	Katlin/Bernstein Productions, Panamort Television and Columbia TriStar Television	
The Best Commercials You've Never Seen (And Some You Have)	1998–2002		7 specials
Storm of the Century	February 14–18, 1999		TV mini-series
Extreme Makeover	2002–2007	Lighthearted Entertainment	
Extreme Makeover: Home Edition	2003–2012; 2020	Base Camp Films, Hoosick Falls Productions, Endemol USA	
The Great Christmas Light Fight	2013–present	Fremantle	
Big Fan	2017	Smo King Baby, Banijay Studios North America	
Boy Band	2017	Matador Content	
Battle of the Network Stars	2017	El Dorado Pictures	
Child Support	2018	Banijay Studios North America	
Castaways	2018	Nomad Entertainment	
The Alec Baldwin Show	2018	El Dorado Pictures	
Holey Moley	2019–2022	Unanimous Media, Eureka Productions	
Encore!	2019–20	Olive Bridge Entertainment, Leading Laidy, Jason Cohen Productions	
Don't	2020	Maximum Effort, Banijay Studios North America	
Emergency Call	2020–2021	8HOURS Television	
The Chase	2021–present	ITV Entertainment	
Pooch Perfect	2021		
The Ultimate Surfer	2021	Pilgrim Media Group, WSL Studios	
Judge Steve Harvey	2022–present	East 112, Den of Thieves	
Who Do You Believe?	2022	All3Media America, Lime Pictures	
The Final Straw	2022	Walt Disney Television Alternative, Omaha Productions, B17 Entertainment	
Claim to Fame	2022–present	Walt Disney Television Alternative, Kinetic Content	
Generation Gap	2022–present	Kimmelot, Milojo Productions, MGM Television	
Back in the Groove	2022		
The Parent Test	2022–present		
The Prank Panel	2023–present	ITV America, Kimmelot	

Movies and specials

Title	Date	Co-production with
The Parsley Garden	March 27, 1993	White Sneakers
Rhythm and Jam: Rhythm & Rap	September 18, 1993	
Rhythm and Jam: Melody & Harmony	September 25, 1993	
Betrayed by Love	January 17, 1994	
Money Made Easy: The ABC Kids' Guide to Dollars and Sense	April 2/9, 1994	Paley/Price Productions
The Secret Garden	November 5, 1994	DIC Entertainment, Kalisto Ltd. Currently owned by WildBrain
World's Funniest Commercials	November 9, 1994	Woody Fraser Enterprises
Jirimpimbira: An African Folk Tale	February 25, 1995	Ruby-Spears Productions
The Secret of Lizard Woman	November 12, 1995	
Put to the Test	April 29, 1996	
Sex with Cindy Crawford	September 22, 1998	
Tom Clancy's NetForce	February 1, 1999	Cates/Doty Productions
Runaway Virus	January 29, 2000	
Quarantine	August 5, 2000	
The 2000 Radio Music Awards	November 4, 2000	Tall Pony Productions, Radio Dogs, Inc.
Victoria's Secret Fashion Show 2001	November 15, 2001	
Challenge America with Erin Brockovich: Miracle in Manhattan	December 21, 2001	
Stephen King's Rose Red	January 27, 2002	Victor Television Productions, Mark Carliner Productions
The Best TV Shows That Never Were	August 16, 2004	
Encore!	December 10, 2017	
Mickey's 90th Spectacular	November 4, 2018	Don Mischer Productions
Live in Front of a Studio Audience	May 22, 2019; December 18, 2019; December 7, 2021	Sony Pictures Television, Act III Communications, Kimmelot Production Company, Smoking Baby Productions, Gary Sanchez Productions
The Little Mermaid Live!	November 5, 2019	Done and Dusted
The Disney Family Singalong	April 16, 2020	Done and Dusted
The Disney Family Singalong: Volume II	May 10, 2020	Done and Dusted
The Happy Days of Garry Marshall	May 12, 2020	
VOMO: Vote or Miss Out	September 14, 2020	
The Disney Holiday Singalong	November 30, 2020	Done and Dusted
The Queen Family Singalong	November 4, 2021	Done and Dusted
The Magic Maker	November 25, 2021	
A Very Boy Band Holiday	December 6, 2021	
Step Into...the Movies with Derek and Julianne Hough	March 20, 2022	
Norman Lear: 100 Years of Music and Laughter	September 22, 2022	
Beauty and the Beast: A 30th Celebration	December 15, 2022	
Schoolhouse Rock! 50th Anniversary Singalong	February 1, 2023	

=== Lincoln Square Productions ===
Lincoln Square Productions, LLC
- Type: Subsidiary
- Industry: TV
- Genre: Documentaries, docudramas and talk shows
- Predecessor: ABC News Productions
- Founded: January 8, 2003
- Key people: Morgan Hertzan
- Brands: Robin Roberts Presents
- Parent: ABC News (Disney Entertainment Television)

Lincoln Square Productions, LLC (LSP) is a television production company owned by ABC News that produces non-fiction content, such as documentaries and talk shows.

History

Lincoln Square Production was formed as a limited liability company on January 8, 2003.

Lincoln Square had previously produced a series known as Watt's World, about journalist Nick Watt traveling to find "little-known places and sub-cultures", in development for the Travel Channel as of Scripps Networks Interactive's upfront event in April 2014. On October 30, 2014, the long-running talk show The View was transferred to Lincoln Square Productions from ABC Entertainment's Times Square Studios after struggling in ratings and a change in hosts.

In January 2015, Lincoln Square had signed a production deal with Christine Connor's XCON historical docudrama company. For A&E channel, Lincoln Square agreed to produce four specials in 2015 starting with Cosby: The Women Speak. The company agreed in July 2018 to produce films by Robin Roberts under the banner "Robin Roberts Presents" for A&E's Lifetime channel. On April 10, 2019, a slate of 10 unscripted series including Rogue Trip from Lincoln Square Productions was revealed for Disney+. Production of Rogue Trip was later taken over by National Geographic.

Programs

- A&E Biography: Jodie Foster (2005)
- The Assets (ABC) January 2, 2014 - August 3, 2014
- Ebola: Inside the Deadly Outbreak (Discovery)
- Final Witness (ABC) a seven-episode true-crime series that premiered June 27, 2012
- Mustang Millionaire (National Geographic Channel)
- NY Med (ABC)
- Surgeon Oz (OWN, 2014–2015)
- The View (ABC) October 30, 2014—present
- Barbara Walters Presents American Scandals (Investigation Discovery, 2015) nine-episode season 1
- “Next Step Realty: NYC” (ABC Family, 2015) a documentary series that follows the Next Step Realty employees in their specialty of finding recent college graduates apartments
- 20/20: In an Instant (ABC; 2015–2018) (with Committee Films)
- 9/11: As We Watched (American Heroes Channel) Tuesday, September 6, 2016
- Capturing Bin Laden (American Heroes Channel) September 7, 2016
- The End of America: Putin's Master Plan working title (History) Biography brand 2 hours special
- Grace vs. Abrams A&E series (March 29, 2018-) Nancy Grace and Dan Abrams debating infamous crimes and legal cases
- Cosby: The Women Speak A&E special (September 17, 2015)
- Robin Roberts Presents (Lifetime) telefilm series in which each film would have a companion documentary. Roberts would be an executive producer along with Linda Berman for the films and John R. Green for the documentary.
  - untitled Mahalia Jackson drama written by Bettina Gilois and documentary
- The Last Defense (2018) (with Xcon Productions and JuVee Productions)
- Reversing Roe (2018) (with UnbeliEVAble Entertainment and Break Thru Films) Netflix, 99 minutes; Directors, screenwriters, producers and narrators: Ricki Stern and Anne Sundberg
- 1969 (2019)
- Mickey: The Story of a Mouse (2022) (co-production with Tremolo Productions)

=== Valleycrest Productions ===
Valleycrest Productions Ltd.
- Type: Subsidiary
- Industry: Television
- Founded: March 6, 1987; 39 years ago
- Services: TV series production
- Parent: ABC Daytime (ABC Entertainment Group)

Valleycrest Productions Limited is a television series production company owned by ABC Daytime.

Valleycrest Productions was incorporated on March 6, 1987. By 1999, Valleycrest was producing "Who Wants to Be a Millionaire" and was a subsidiary of Buena Vista Television by that time.

On December 2, 2011, Disney-ABC Television Group placed daytime and syndicated production under Times Square Studios.

Valleycrest moved production of Who Wants to Be a Millionaire in 2014 to the Connecticut Film Center in Stamford, Connecticut, to take advantage of the state's film/television tax credits.

Filmography

Title	Years	Network	Notes
Mike and Maty	April 1994–June 1996	ABC	
Win Ben Stein's Money	1997–2003	Comedy Central	
Who Wants to Be a Millionaire	1999–2021	ABC/Syndication	co-production with Celador (1999–2007)/2waytraffic (2007–19)/Embassy Row (2020–2021)/Kimmelot (2020–2021); distributed in India by Sony Pictures Television (2020)
The Ainsley Harriott Show	2000	Syndication	co-production with Merv Griffin Entertainment and Buena Vista Television

== Defunct ==
=== ABC Circle 7 Productions ===
ABC Circle 7 Productions, Inc.
- Type: Subsidiary
- Industry: Television
- Genre: News
- Founded: December 15, 1983; 42 years ago
- Fate: Closed
- Parent: ABC Owned Television Stations

ABC Circle 7 Productions, Inc. was the programming subsidiary of the ABC Owned Stations in the 1980s.

In August 1983, Circle 7 Productions announced its Newsbank news distribution service. ABC Circle 7 Productions was incorporated on December 15, 1983.

Programming

- Newsbank, news distribution service making about 24 stories available to subscribing stations from ABC's (then) five O&O Stations

=== ABC Productions ===
ABC Productions
- Type: Division
- Industry: Television
- Founded: March 21, 1989; 37 years ago
- Defunct: June 7, 1996; 30 years ago
- Fate: Closed; Library has been integrated into the first incarnation of Touchstone Television (then ABC Studios, ABC Signature Studios, ABC Signature and currently 20th Television)
- Successor: ABC Studios; ABC Signature; 20th Television
- Headquarters: Century City
- Key people: Brandon Stoddard (president); Brian McAndrews (EVP of production at ABC)
- Production output: TV shows; Miniseries; Telefilms
- Number of employees: 13 (1996)
- Parent: ABC Television Network Group (The Walt Disney Company)
- Divisions: ABC Pictures; DreamWorks Television (50%); Greengrass Productions
- Subsidiaries: Andrew Adelson Co.

ABC Productions (ABCP) was a television production company that was a division of ABC Television Network Group. While the ABC network had first shot at the unit's shows, the company was allowed to shop shows to other networks and was the first to sell to another network. The company was set up increase the control and financial rewards of producing its own TV shows.

History

ABC Productions was formed in 1989 as ABC Network's in-house production unit after the alteration of the fin-syn rules that increased network ownership to only 40% of prime-time programs. Former ABC Motion Pictures president and ABC Entertainment president Brandon Stoddard on March 21, 1989, to head up the then unnamed production unit, though one source believed it was the former ABC subsidiary ABC Circle Films. In the fall of 1989, it is said that ABC Productions would sign on to develop projects for NBC, HBO and Lifetime.

By early 1991, ABC Productions had purchased Andrew Adelson Co. then signed Andrew Adelson to an exclusive production contract. By May 1991, ABCP produced eight pilots, a series, a miniseries and several TV movies. "My Life and Times" was the company's first series production placed with the ABC network and debuted in May 1991, but was yanked after the ratings dropped 19% from week 1 to 2, so as to avoid May sweeps. While its first miniseries, "An Inconvenient Woman" was shown on ABC in the May sweeps was produced by Adelson. For Lifetime, ABCP produced a telefilm, 'Stop at Nothing'. Former Cosby Show co-executive producer Elliot Shonman for ABCP created, written and produced Coconut Downs while agreeing to a two-year exclusivity deal. Also signing production deals by June 1991 were Martthew Carlson (an extension), Steve Kronish and Norman Morrill. 29 projects were under development.

By the 1994–95 season, ABC Productions was providing half of ABC's regular series programming. DreamWorks Television was formed in December 1994 as DreamWorks Studios agreed to a $200 million seven-year TV production joint venture with Capital Cities/ABC. ABCP placed "The Boys are Back" with CBS for the 1994–1995 season.

In June 1995, Stoddard stepped down as ABC Productions president. On June 7, 1996, due to the merger with Disney, Capital Cities/ABC indicated that its ABC Productions division operations would be shut down while keeping its boutique production companies: Victor Television Productions, ABC/Kane Productions, DIC Entertainment and Greengrass Productions. ABCP executive in charge Brian McAndrews continued managing ABC's other production arms for TV movies, documentaries and children's programming and production interests with DreamWorks SKG, Brillstein-Grey Entertainment and Jim Henson Productions. McAndrews left in early March 1998 for an ABC Sports position, while Greengrass Productions was folded into ABC Entertainment and its telefilm unit, ABC Pictures, would finish its last five projects then disband.

Filmography

Title	Years	Network	Notes
Fantasies	1990	ABC	TV special
Stop at Nothing	March 12, 1991	ABC	TV movie
My Life and Times	1991	ABC	co-production with Sea Change Productions
American Detective	1991	ABC	season 1 only; co-production with Paul Stojanovich Productions and Orion Television Entertainment
Coconut Downs	1991	ABC	TV pilot
An American Saturday Night	May 4, 1991	ABC	TV special
An Inconvenient Woman	May 12–13, 1991	ABC	TV mini-series
To Save A Child	September 8, 1991	ABC	TV movie
The Commish	1991–1996	ABC	co-production with Three-Putt Productions and Stephen J. Cannell Productions
She Woke Up	January 19, 1992	ABC	TV movie
Fugitive Among Us	February 4, 1992	CBS	TV movie
Running Delilah	1992	ABC	TV movie; co-production with Sea Change Productions
Broadway Bound	March 23, 1992	ABC	TV movie
Jack's Place	1992–1993	ABC	
America Behind Closed Doors	August 6, 1992	CBS	TV pilot
Camp Wilder	1992–1993	ABC	co-production with Vanity Card Productions
Desperate Choices: To Save My Child	October 5, 1992	ABC	TV movie
The Amy Fisher Story	January 3, 1993	ABC	TV movie; co-production with Andrew Adelson Company, Michael Jaffe Films and Spectacor Films
Class of '96	1993	FOX	co-production with Mandy Films
Kiss of a Killer	February 1, 1993	ABC	TV movie
Sirens	1993	ABC	season 1 only
The Circle Game	July 7, 1993	ABC	TV pilot
Joe's Life	1993	ABC	co-production with Bob Myer Productions
The Paula Poundstone Show	1993	ABC	
The Only Way Out	December 19, 1993	ABC	TV movie
My Name Is Kate	January 16, 1994	ABC	TV movie
Out of Darkness	January 26, 1994	ABC	TV movie; co-production with Anaid Film Productions and Andrew Adelson Co.
My So-Called Life	1994–1995	ABC	co-production with The Bedford Falls Company
The Boys Are Back	1994–1995	CBS	co-production with Vanity Card Productions
McKenna	1994–1995	ABC	
Me and the Boys	1994–1995	ABC	co-production with Bob Myer Productions
A Dangerous Affair	January 1, 1995	ABC	TV movie
She Stood Alone: The Tailhook Scandal	May 22, 1995	ABC	TV movie
Bringing up Jack	1995	ABC	co-production with Katlin/Bernstein Productions
Almost Golden: The Jessica Savitch Story	September 4, 1995	Lifetime	TV movie
Deadly Love	October 16, 1995	Lifetime	TV movie
The Faculty	1995–1996	ABC	co-production with Meredith Baxter Productions and Thompson-Murphy Productions
Sophie And The Moonhanger	January 15, 1996	Lifetime	TV movie
Any Mother's Son	August 11, 1997	Lifetime	TV movie

==== ABC Pictures ====
ABC Pictures
- Type: Division
- Industry: Filmed entertainment
- Defunct: 1998
- Key people: Didier Pietri (SVP)
- Number of employees: 9 (1998)
- Parent: ABC Productions

ABC Pictures was an in house television movie production company of ABC Productions.

The company agreed to a two-year TV movie and miniseries deal with Gary L. Pudney in 1997 with “The Picture of Dorian Gray” in development under the deal. ABC Pictures agreed on August 20, 1997, with the C.P. Group and BIG Entertainment to develop "Tom Clancy's Net Force", as a four-hour miniseries which was broadcast in 1998.

After its final five projects in development, ABC Pictures was shut down in 1998.

Filmography

Title	Years	Network	Notes
Their Second Chance	February 9, 1997	Lifetime	
Jitters	May 5, 1997	Lifetime	
Convictions	November 10, 1997	The Family Channel	
Circle of Deceit	January 29, 1998	ABC	co-production with Andrea Baynes Productions
Twice Upon a Time	November 9, 1998	Lifetime	co-production with Chris/Rose Productions

=== ABC Circle Films ===
ABC Circle Films
- Industry: TV
- Genre: Movie of the week
- Founded: 1970; 56 years ago
- Defunct: 1989; 37 years ago
- Successor: ABC Productions
- Products: TV movies, miniseries and series
- Production output: TV shows

ABC Circle Films (ACF or Circle) was a television movie and series production company owned by ABC that operated from 1970 (Note: Chapter 1"Season One: An Expensive Experiment". Page 20.) to 1989.

ABC Circle Films was formed after the first season of Movie of the Week to build on the telefilm success. ACF was granted a larger budget (by $250,000) and half an hour longer than the movie of the week thus considered a prestige or "A" movie. Circle's films were shown on Sunday night where they alternated with recent feature films and on Monday night after the end of Monday Night Football. With the 1972–1973 season, ACF began producing films for Movie of the Week including Pursuit. (Note: Chapter 4 "Season Four: Feeding the Beast Twice a Week". Page 94.)

Lewis H. Erlicht was demoted from president of ABC Entertainment to senior vice president and president of ACF in November 1985.

The company was merged into ABC Productions in 1989.

Filmography

Title	Year(s)	Notes
No Place to Run	September 18, 1972 (Note: Alphabetical Filmography. Page 202-364.)	co-production with Spelling-Goldberg Productions
Haunts of the Very Rich	September 20, 1972	
The Bounty Man	October 31, 1972	co-production with Spelling-Goldberg Productions
Home for the Holidays	November 28, 1972	co-production with Spelling-Goldberg Productions
Pursuit	December 12, 1972	
The Night Strangler	January 16, 1973	co-production with Dan Curtis Productions
Pray for the Wildcats	January 23, 1973 (Note: Chapter5 "Season Five: TV Movie Saturation". Page 122-124.)	
The Letters	March 6, 1973	co-production with Spelling-Goldberg Productions
Isn't It Shocking?	October 2, 1973	
The President's Plane is Missing	October 23, 1973	based on the novel by Robert J. Serling, Rod Serling's brother
Guess Who's Sleeping in My Bed?	October 31, 1973	
The Girl Most Likely To...	November 6, 1973	
Outrage	November 28, 1973	
A Cold Night's Death	January 30, 1974	co-production with Spelling-Goldberg Productions
Can Ellen Be Saved?	February 5, 1974	
The Day the Earth Moved	September 18, 1974	
The Great Ice Rip-Off	November 6, 1974	co-production with Dan Curtis Productions
Reflections of Murder	November 24, 1974	co-production with Aaron Rosenberg/Charles Lederer Productions
Love Among the Ruins	March 6, 1975	
Young Pioneers	March 1, 1976	
The Great Houdini	October 8, 1976	
Young Pioneers' Christmas	December 17, 1976	
ABC Weekend Special	1977–1985	TV series; 27 episodes
Superdome	January 9, 1978	
The Girls in the Office	February 2, 1979	
The Comeback Kid	April 11, 1980	
She's in the Army Now	May 15, 1981	
Pray TV	February 1, 1982	
Inside the Third Reich	May 9, 1982	
The Day After	November 20, 1983	
My Mother's Secret Life	February 5, 1984	co-production with Furia-Oringer Productions
Moonlighting	1985–1989	TV series; co-production with Picturemaker Productions
Love Lives On	April 1, 1985	co-production with Script/Song
Acceptable Risks	March 2, 1986	
Triplecross	March 17, 1986	co-production with Tisch/Avnet Productions
Out on a Limb	January 18–19, 1987	miniseries; co-production with Stan Margulies Company
Amerika	February 15–19, 1987	14 1/2-hour miniseries
Infidelity	April 13, 1987	co-production with Mark-Jett Productions
War and Remembrance	1988–1989	Miniseries; co-production with Dan Curtis Productions

=== ABC/Kane Productions ===
ABC/Kane Productions International
- Type: Corporation
- Genre: Documentary
- Founded: (October 1, 1989)
- Headquarters: Washington, D.C., US
- Parent: Disney–ABC Television Group (now Disney Entertainment Television)

ABC/Kane Productions International (AKPI) is/was a nonfiction programs production company owned by Disney-ABC Television Group. The production company earned 13 Emmy Awards, 6 Genesis Awards, numerous CINE awards, film festival awards and an Academy Award nomination.

ABC/Kane Productions International was formed by Capital Cities/ABC Inc. as a unit of its ABC Television Network Group on October 1, 1988, with the appointment of its first president, Dennis B. Kane. Original plans for the unit was five programs a year for five years starting in October 1990 for ABC and other outlets.

ABC/Kane received 11 Emmy nominations in 1998 for The Living Edens series, the highest to date, while winning 5 five news and documentary Emmys. Devillier Donegan Enterprises, a unit of Buena Vista International Television, in February 1999 took over distribution, management and operation of AKPI.

Productions

- The Living Edens (1997-2003, PBS)
- ABC's World of Discovery
- Secrets of the Internet
- Tales of the Serengeti
- Wildlife Tales
- ABC Saturday Children's Special & series pilot "Crash the Curiosaurus" (January 14, 1995)

=== Devillier Donegan Enterprises ===
Devillier Donegan Enterprises
- Founded: 1980
- Headquarters: Washington, DC
- Production output: Documentary

Devillier Donegan Enterprises (DDE) was first formed by Ron Devillier and Brian Donegan in 1980 as a documentary production company and was reformed in 1994 with majority ownership by Capital Cities/ABC. Disney took over ownership upon its purchase of CC/ABC. DDE, a unit of Buena Vista International Television, in February 1999 took over distribution, management and operation of ABC/Kane Productions International. In 2001, DDE began looking for a new owner as Disney is in the movie business with Alliance Atlantis Communications and Granada begin front runners. Instead DDE management on March 11, 2002, bought Disney/ABC stake in the company. DDE also held on to ABC/Kane Productions' library and will continue to represent ABC News Productions.

=== ABC News Productions ===
ABC News Productions (ABCNP) is a long form documentary production unit within ABC News's ABC News Digital Media Group. ABCNP produces documentaries for cable channels, international broadcasters and home video.

ABC News Productions was formed in 1994. In August 2006, ABCNP was placed into ABC News All Media along with the ABC News production unit.

Partial filmography

- The Trial of Adolf Eichmann (PBS) Emmy Award nominated
- Vietnam War (TLC) 8 hours
- Biography (A&E) 200 plus episodes

Daily TV shows

- Lifetime Live (Lifetime)
- She TV (Discovery Health Channel)

=== ABC Motion Pictures ===
ABC Motion Pictures
- Type: Subsidiary
- Industry: Entertainment
- Predecessor: ABC Pictures International
- Founded: May 1979
- Defunct: October 28, 1985
- Fate: Closed
- Key people: Brandon Stoddard (president)
- Production output: Theatrical & TV films, TV shows, miniseries
- Parent: American Broadcasting Companies, Inc.

ABC Motion Pictures was a production company of ABC that operated from May 1979. 20th Century Fox was the company's distributor. Until October 1985, the division produced theatrical films along with TV movies, series and mini-series.

History

ABC Motion Pictures was founded in May 1979 with Brandon Stoddard as president. Soon the division was swapped with old film projects. While a boutique would make only a few films per year, Stoddard figured that ABC would succeed in movie production as there were additional revenue sources from video cassettes and cable on top of theater ticket sales and broadcast TV sales. ABC Motion Pictures was incorporated by June 11, 1980.

The division waited two years to get its first slate of three films into production with National Lampoon's Class Reunion just an announcement and Young Doctors in Love beginning production in December 1981 under the theatrical directorial debut of Garry Marshall. In June 1982, "Chain Reaction" (later "Silkwood") starring Meryl Streep was expected to be in production.

The Flamingo Kid after released by Fox did well but not strong business, Fox pulled the film from release so as to stop spending money on advertising.

With networks getting better rating for their own movies of the week over films released on cable and cassettes, networks reduced licensing of theatrical films. Additional boutique production companies entered the market at the same time crowding the market and increasing filming costs. With films distributed by a major studio, ABC's films were slotted in less desirable release dates. On October 28, 1985, ABC shut down ABC Motion Pictures theatrical motion picture operation after the release of only 6 theatrical films which was within weeks of CBS shutting down CBS Theatrical Films. The unit released one last movie, SpaceCamp, already produced in the summer of 1985. The unit would continue producing TV movies and mini-series while increasing TV series output. A Donaldson, Lufkin & Jenrette Securities Corporation media analyst forecast ABC's losses on its theatrical operations for 1985 to be $5 million. After ABC shuttered down, the company elected to terminate its agreement with Mercury Entertainment in March 1986.

Filmography

Theatrical films

Title	Year	Notes
Young Doctors in Love	1982	profitable
National Lampoon's Class Reunion	1982	
Silkwood	1983	profitable
The Flamingo Kid	1984	profitable
Impulse	1984	
Prizzi's Honor	1985	profitable
SpaceCamp	1986	

=== ABC Pictures International ===
ABC Pictures International, Inc.
- Type: Subsidiary
- Industry: Filmed entertainment
- Founded: 1965 (Inc.: November 3, 1967)
- Defunct: 1973; Dissolution (February 19, 1988)
- Successor: ABC Motion Pictures, Inc.
- Key people: Martin Baum (Note: Orders of Magnitude. Page 332-333.)
- Production output: theatrical films
- Parent: American Broadcasting Companies, Inc.

ABC Pictures International, Inc. (also ABC Picture Holdings, Inc.; API) was the theatrical production company owned and operated by ABC from 1965 to 1973 and produced or co produced 37 films. The company's films were distributed by Cinerama Releasing Corporation. (Note: Page 10.)

History

ABC Pictures was started as a division in 1965 and was incorporated as ABC Picture Holdings, Inc. on November 3, 1967. In 1967, it activated Palomar Pictures and Selmur Pictures to produce pictures for it. The entry of ABC into theatrical film production led to an FCC inquiry over the network's control of programming and a MPAA anti-trust lawsuit. David O. Selznick owned films were sold after his death in 1965 to API by his widow, Jennifer Jones.

The company's films (including those made by Selmur and Palomar) were not profitable and, with the recession of 1969–1971, ABC Pictures Corporation closed down its operations (Note: Page 71.) in early 1973. The 36 films cost $75 million to produce and generated rentals of $107 million, but with other costs such as distribution fees and interest, generated losses of $35 million. Only 6 of the films were profitable.

On October 20, 1977, ABC Picture Holdings, Inc. changed its name to ABC Pictures International, Inc. and was finally dissolved on February 19, 1988.

Release date	Title	Other production co.
1967	Good Times	Motion Pictures International
May 20, 1970	Suppose They Gave a War and Nobody Came	
August 12, 1970	Lovers and Other Strangers	
October 1, 1970	How Do I Love Thee?	Freeman-Enders
November 4, 1970	Song of Norway	
1971	The 300 Year Weekend	
January 18, 1971	Zachariah	George Englund Productions
January 28, 1971	The Last Valley	Season Productions; Seamaster Films
May 28, 1971	The Grissom Gang	Associates & Aldrich Co.
July 1971	The Touch	Cinematograph A.B.
September 1971	Kotch	
November 3, 1971	Straw Dogs	
February 13, 1972	Cabaret	Allied Artists
June 1972	Junior Bonner	Solar Production Inc.
1976	Mastermind	

=== ABC Media Productions ===
ABC Media Productions
- Formerly: Buena Vista Productions
- Type: Unit
- Industry: TV
- Genre: talk, game, reality
- Predecessor: Buena Vista Development
- Owner: ABC Daytime (ABC Television Group)

ABC Media Productions (AMP), originally named Buena Vista Productions (BVP), was the in house television development, production and programming unit within ABC Daytime. The company produces non-scripted programming in all three areas (talk, game, reality) for syndication, cable and prime time outlets including outside the Disney conglomerate. The division has oversight of the production of "Who Wants to Be a Millionaire".

==== AMP history ====
In September 2000 following the merger of ABC Daytime Group and Buena Vista's development group, ABC Daytime replaced Buena Vista Development with Buena Vista Productions, to be headed by president Angela Shapiro, who was then also ABC Daytime president. Shapiro was transferred to ABC Family President in April 2002 with Holly Jacobs taking over at BVP as executive vice president the next month.

In August 2006, BVP and Fujisankei Communications partnered to develop and produce "Run for Money," a game show for the American market, adapted from the original Japanese reality-game show of the same title.

In September 2008, BVP entered a first-look development deal with Silverback, a Swedish production company. In 2009, Buena Vista Productions was renamed ABC Media Productions. In May, AMP was developing The Aisha Tyler Show, a variety & comedy talk show with interactive components including social media, for cable or broadcast syndication.

==== Programs ====
- Cha$e, Sci Fi Channel
- Who Wants to Be a Millionaire, syndication
- At the Movies With Ebert & Roeper, syndication (1986-)
- "The Fashionista Diaries" (SoapNet)
- "Camouflage" Game Show Network
- Wayne Brady Show

=== American Broadcasting-Paramount Theatres Pictures ===
Atlas Pictures Corporation
- Formerly: American Broadcasting-Paramount Theatres Pictures Corporation (1956–1959)
- Type: Corporation
- Industry: Feature films
- Founded: (December 30, 1956)
- Key people: Irving H. Levin (President)
- Owner: Irving H. Levin (1959)
- Parent: American Broadcasting-Paramount Theatres (1956–1959)

Atlas Pictures Corporation, formerly American Broadcasting-Paramount Theatres Pictures Corporation (also known as AB-PT Pictures and AB-PT) was the film production subsidiary of American Broadcasting-Paramount Theatres.

The company was formed due to a shorting of films produced, which was the reason for AB-PT not to sign a consent agreement in 1949 against the company's production of films. Films from AB-PT were first shown in Paramount Theater circuits prior to release to other chains. AB-PT Pictures used the Republic Pictures lot for productions. Republic was also their distributor, physically delivering to even AB-PT theaters plus sale to non-AB-PT theaters.

American Broadcasting-Paramount Theatres Pictures Corporation was formed on December 30, 1956. Irving H. Levin was appointed President of the company. AB-PT Pictures initial production budget was $3 million for seven films. Films were to be B-films with an eye on quality but "meet the exhibitor's call for 'highly gimmicked and exploitable' product." In March 1957, AB-PT was talking with Republic and United Artists regarding distribution. The company's first film was Beginning of the End. With its first acquisition of The Unearthly in early May, AB-PT placed it into a double feature premiere with End released on June 19 at the B&K Roosevelt Theatre. On May 9, 1957, AB-PT Pictures executives met with the exhibition arm of the film industry where they announced their first slate of 7 films with announcement of a distributor in the next 10 days.

On June 6, 1957, AB-PT agreed to have Republic distribute their films. The company's first double bill films did well despite the films uneven quality. On September 24, 1957, AB-PT Pictures indicated that the company would move in the next year into A features with 5 of their 15 planned films to be of this type. For the A films, budgets would run from $.5 million to $1 million. However, AB-PT would only produce four films. AB-PT Pictures provided funding for The Bat (1959 film).

Levin along with Harry L. Mandell purchased AB-PT Pictures and AB-PT Distribution Corporation from AB-PT in May 1958. AB-PT Pictures was renamed Atlas Pictures Corporation.

Films

- Beginning of the End (June 19, 1957)
- The Unearthly (June 19, 1957)
- Eighteen and Anxious (February 1958)
- Girl in the Woods (February 1958)

=== Circle Seven Productions ===
Circle Seven Productions
- Industry: Television
- Products: TV shows
- Owner: KGO-TV (American Broadcasting-Paramount Theatres)

Circle Seven Productions was the production company of ABC's owned-and-operated station in San Francisco, KGO-TV, in the 1950s and 1960s. The company produced shows for the network and for syndication. Shows produced included a Jack LaLanne fitness series and a Tennessee Ernie Ford daytime talk/variety series.

=== Keep Calm and Carry On Productions ===
Keep Calm and Carry On Productions, Inc. is an ABC subsidiary production company that produced Duets and The Glass House. Keep Calm was sued over The Glass House by CBS for using proprietary procedures from Big Brother via hired away staff. The production company was incorporated on October 24, 2008.

=== Palomar Pictures International ===
Palomar Pictures International
- Industry: Movie
- Founder: Edgar Scherick
- Successor: Edgar J. Scherick Associates
- Parent: American Broadcasting Companies, Inc.

Palomar Pictures International was a film production subsidiary of American Broadcasting Companies, Inc. It is not to be confused with another company with the name Palomar Pictures, founded in 1992 by Anne-Marie Mackay and Jonathon Ker and whose majority ownership stake was sold to Sigurjon "Joni" Sighvattson, a founder of Propaganda Films, in 1999.

Palomar Pictures International was started by Edgar Scherick. In 1967, it started actively producing films for ABC.

In 1969, Palomar severed its ties with ABC and in 1970, Bristol-Myers acquired a majority stake.

Feature Films
Release date	Title	Notes
July 1968	For Love of Ivy	
December 9, 1968	The Birthday Party	produced with Amicus Productions; released through Continental, the motion picture division of the Walter Reade Organization
December 1968	The Killing of Sister George	
December 1968	Shalako	
July 23, 1969	What Ever Happened to Aunt Alice?	
December 1969	Ring of Bright Water	
1969	They Shoot Horses, Don't They?	
1969	Take the Money and Run	
1969	A Touch of Love	produced with Amicus Productions
January 1970	Jenny	
May 1970	Too Late the Hero	ABC Pictures and The Associates and Aldrich
September 1970	Homer	produced with Cinema Center Films after ties severed with ABC
February 1972	When Michael Calls	
1972	The Strangers in 7A	
June 1972	What Became of Jack and Jill?	produced with Amicus Productions
June 1972	The Strange Vengeance of Rosalie	
August 1972	To Kill a Clown	Presents
September 1972	The Darwin Adventure	
December 1972	Sleuth	
December 1972	The Heartbreak Kid	
1972	Getting Away from It All	
August 1973	Gordon's War	
October 9, 1974	Law and Disorder	
1974	The Taking of Pelham One Two Three	presented by
1975	The Stepford Wives	
1975	The Silence	

=== Selmur Productions ===
Selmur Productions, Inc.
- Type: Subsidiary corporation
- Industry: Filmed entertainment
- Founded: 1960
- Founder: Selig J. Seligman
- Production output: TV shows, theater features
- Parent: American Broadcasting Companies, Inc.

Selmur Productions, Inc. was formed in 1960 by Selig J. Seligman as a TV production arm of ABC. Selmur Pictures, Inc., also headed by Seligman, was a film production company owned by American Broadcasting Companies, Inc. In 1968, Selmur Pictures, Inc. changed from being a supervising entity to an active film producer, while Selmur Productions was disbanded.

TV series

- Combat
- Garrison's Gorillas
- General Hospital
- Shindig

Feature Films
Release date	Title	Other production co.
1967	Smashing Time	co- productions with Carlo Ponti
1968	A Minute to Pray, A Second to Die	co- productions with Carlo Ponti
1968	Candy	
	Charly	
	Hell in the Pacific	
	Cop-Out	
1967	The Rover	
	Diamonds for Breakfast	
	The High Commissioner	
1969	Midas Run	

=== Victor Television Productions ===
Victor Television Productions was a boutique production company owned by ABC Entertainment.

On June 7, 1996, due to the merger with Disney, Capital Cities/ABC ended its ABC Productions division operations while keeping its boutique production companies: Victor Television Productions, ABC/Kane Productions, DIC Entertainment and Greengrass Productions.

Filmography

- Summertime Switch (October 8, 1994)
- Family Reunion: A Relative Nightmare (April 1, 1995) (co-production with Hickox-Bowman Productions Inc.)
- Spring Fling! (April 15, 1995) (co-production with Hickox-Bowman Productions Inc.)
- When The Vows Break (November 1, 1995)
- A Case For Life (February 18, 1996)
- The Stepford Husbands (May 14, 1996)
- The Siege at Ruby Ridge (May 19, 1996) (co-production with Edgar J. Scherick Associates and The Regan Company)
- Chasing The Dragon (June 19, 1996)
- For The Future: The Irvine Fertility Scandal (August 21, 1996)
- Devil's Food (September 2, 1996)
- Frank Herbert's Dune (December 3, 2000) (co-production with New Amsterdam Entertainment, Blixa Film Produktion and Hallmark Entertainment)
- Stephen King's Rose Red (January 27, 2002) (co-production with Greengrass Productions and Mark Carliner Productions)
- Frank Herbert's Children of Dune (mini-series; March 16–26, 2003)
- The Diary of Ellen Rimbauer (May 12, 2003)

== See also ==
- Animation studios owned by the Walt Disney Company
- Movies produced by ABC
- Other boutique theater film production companies
  - Time-Life Films
  - General Cinema
  - American cinema
  - Filmways
  - Cinema Center Films
