= 41st Golden Globe Awards =

Film award ceremony in 1984

- Date: January 28, 1984
- Site: Beverly Hilton Hotel; Beverly Hills, Los Angeles, California
- Hosted by: John Forsythe; Julie Walters

Highlights
- Best Film: Drama: Terms of Endearment
- Best Film: Musical or Comedy: Yentl
- Best Drama Series: Dynasty
- Best Musical or Comedy Series: Fame
- Most awards: (4) Terms of Endearment
- Most nominations: (6) Terms of Endearment; Yentl

The 41st Golden Globe Awards, honoring the best in film and television for 1983, were held on January 28, 1984.

== Winners and nominees ==
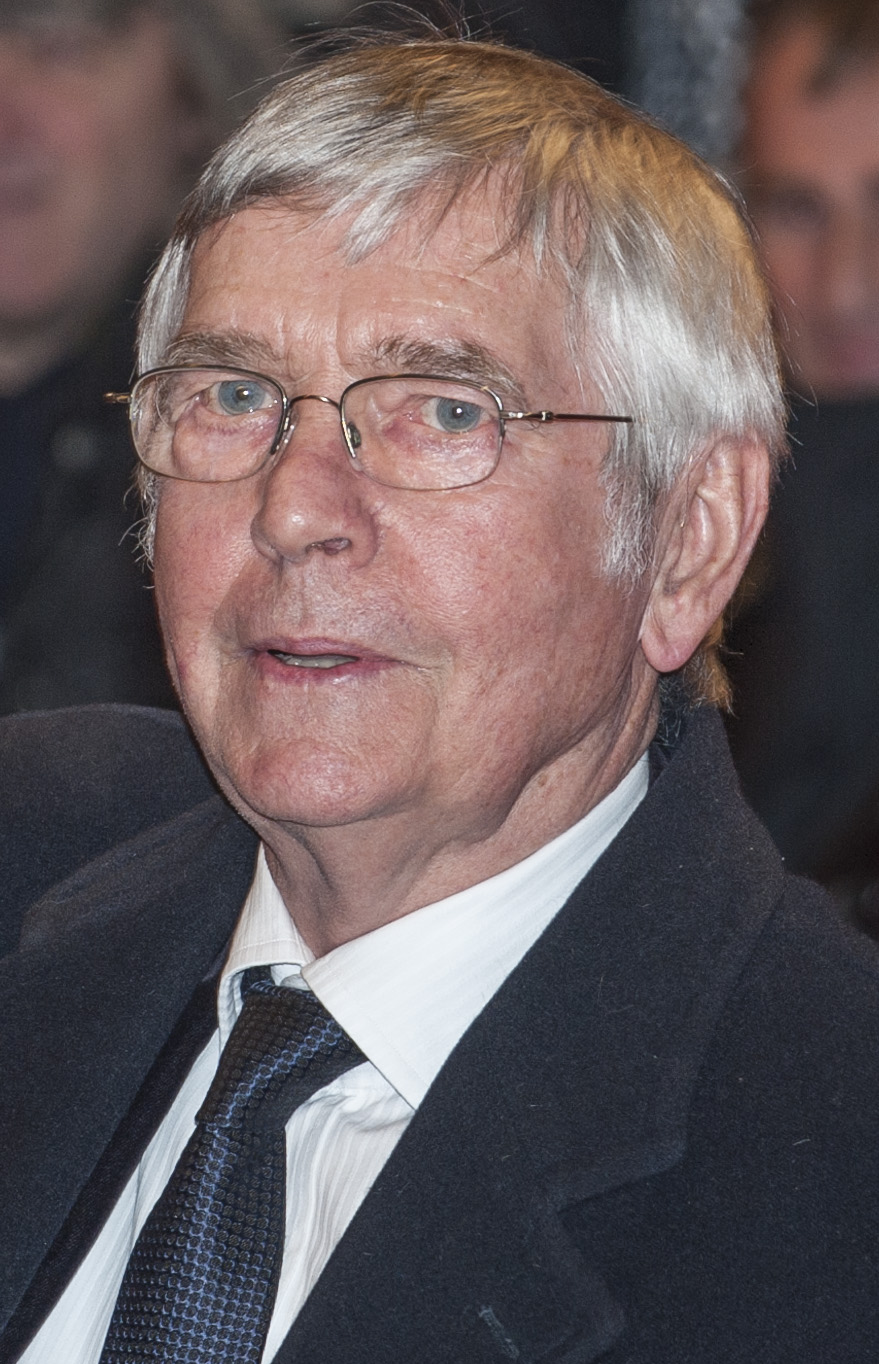
Tom Courtenay — Best Actor in a Motion Picture, Drama co-winner

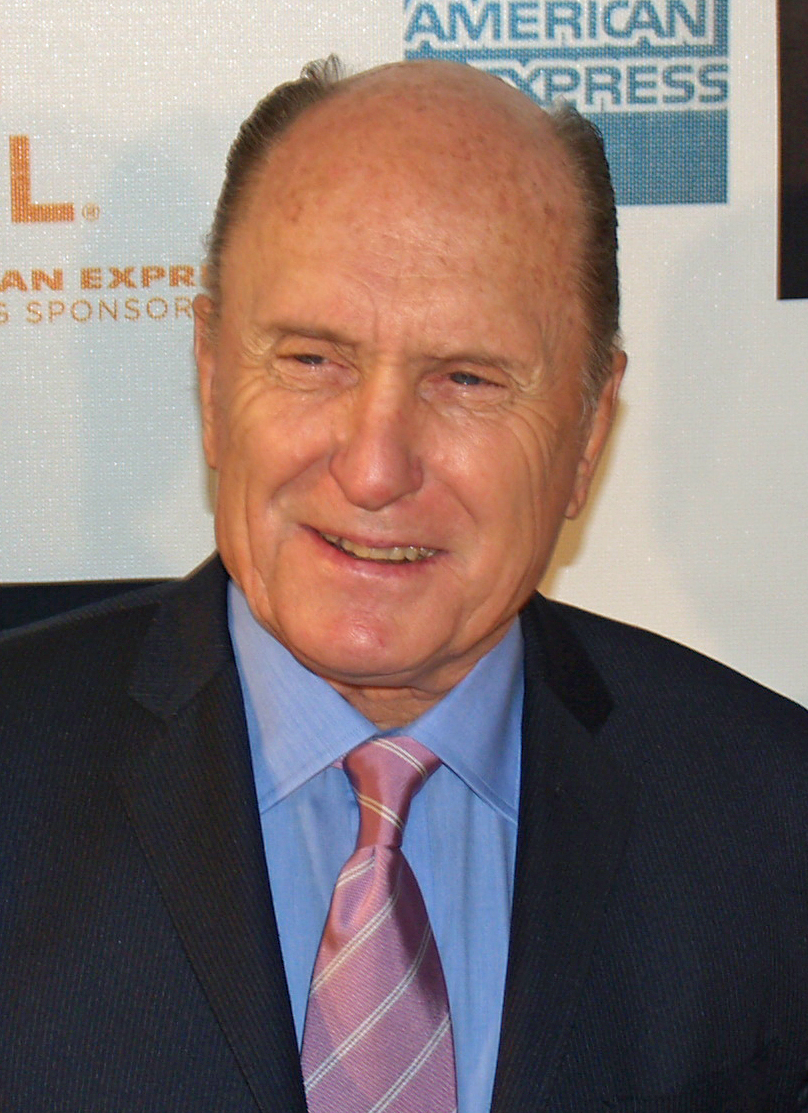
Robert Duvall — Best Actor in a Motion Picture, Drama co-winner

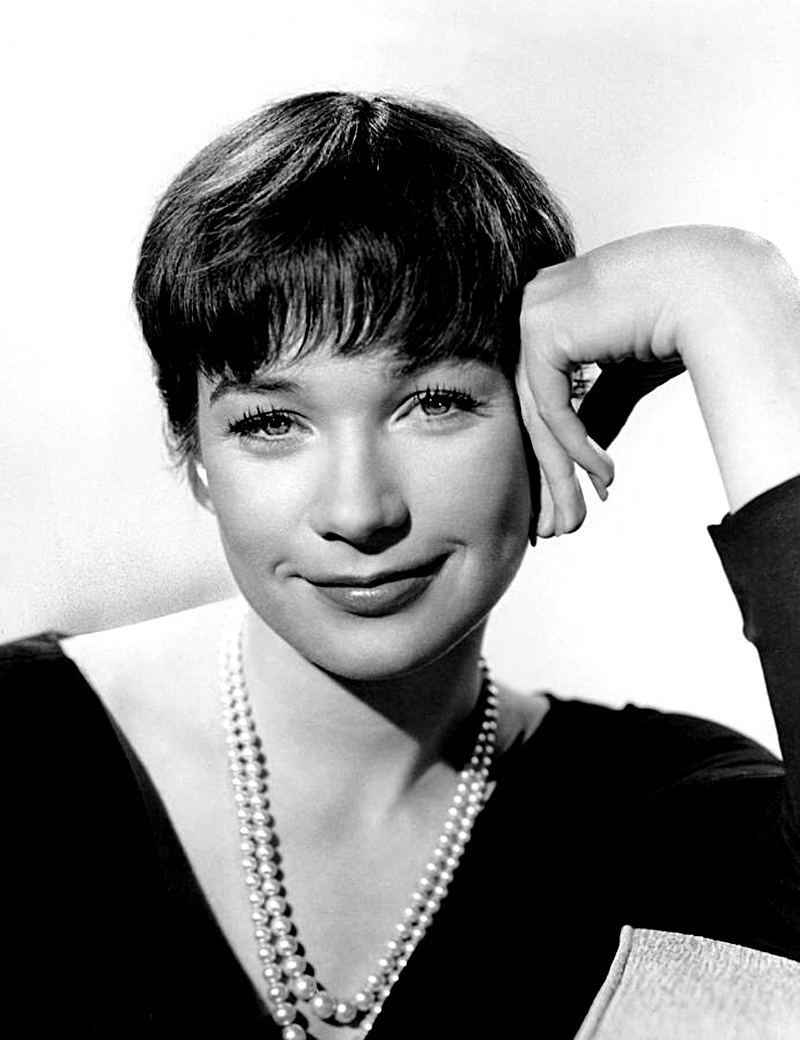
Shirley MacLaine — Best Actress in a Motion Picture, Drama winner

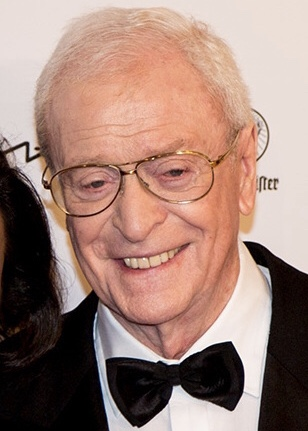
Michael Caine — Best Actor in a Motion Picture, Comedy or Musical winner

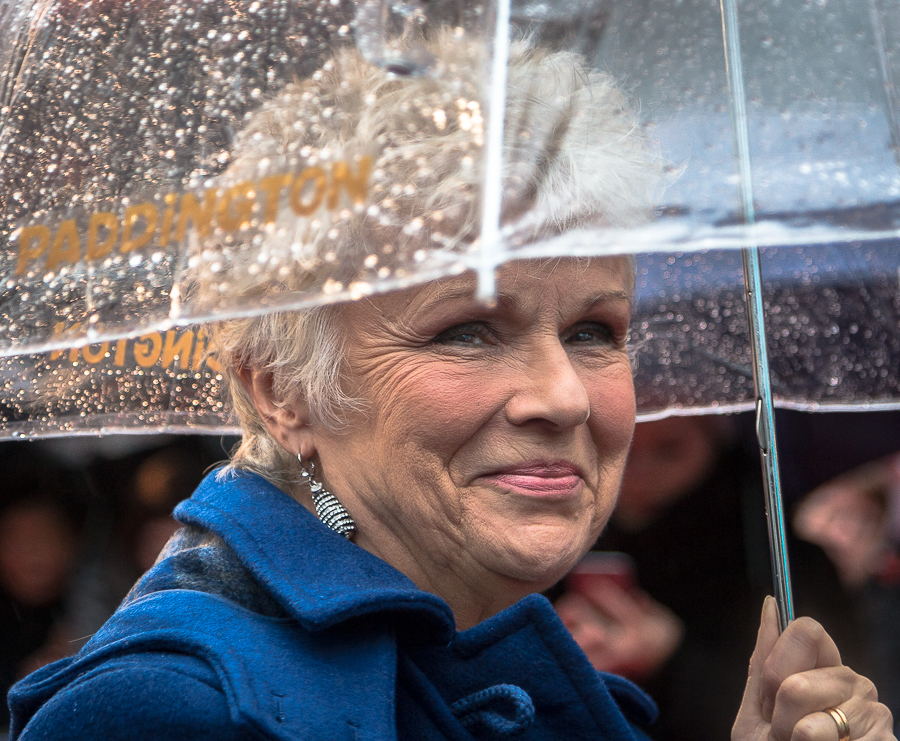
Julie Walters — Best Actress in a Motion Picture, Comedy or Musical winner

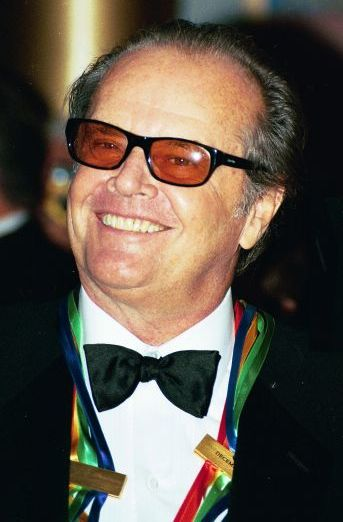
Jack Nicholson — Best Supporting Actor in a Motion Picture, winner

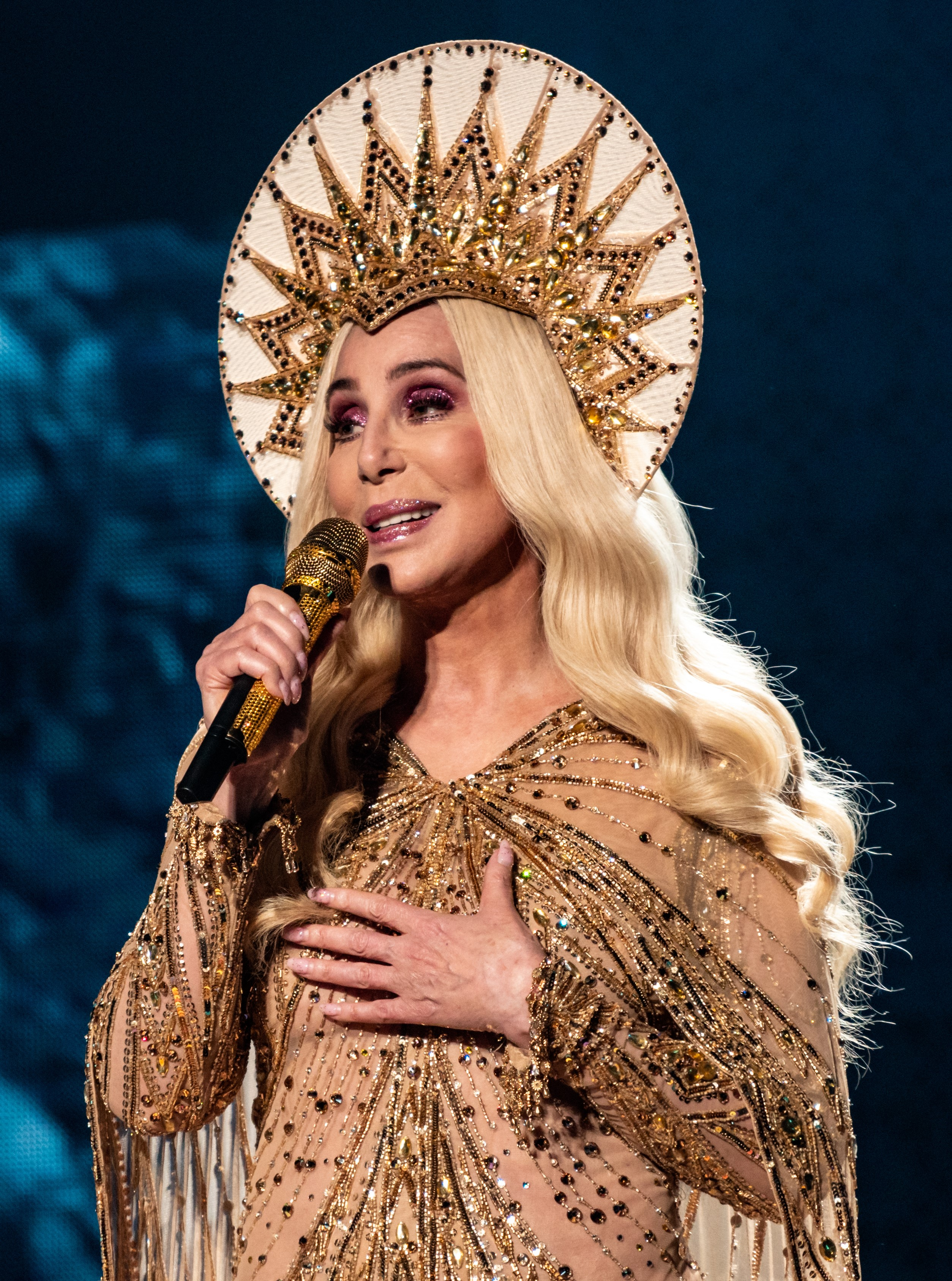
Cher — Best Supporting Actress in a Motion Picture, winner

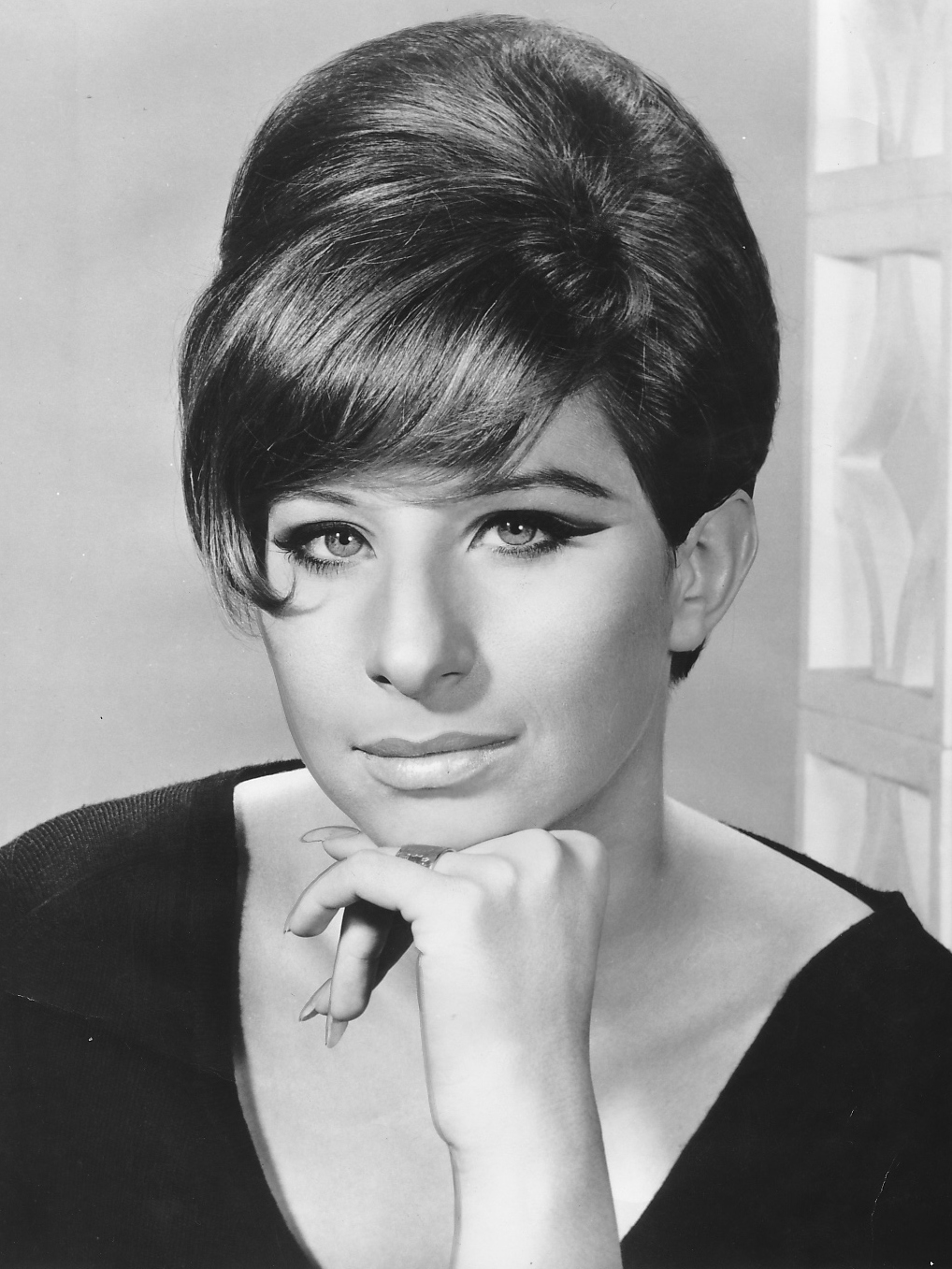
Barbra Streisand — Best Director, winner

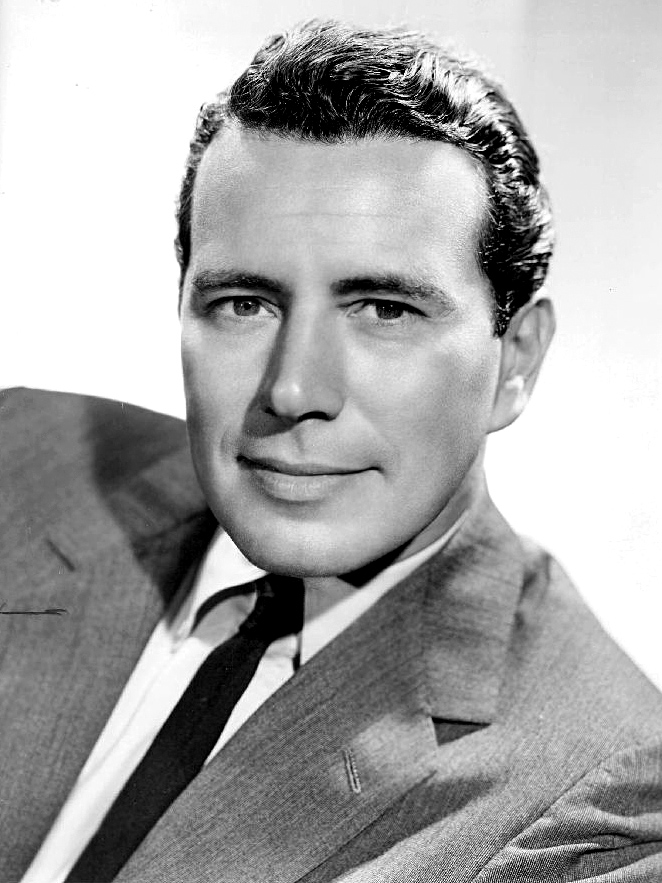
John Forsythe — Best Actor in a Television Series, Drama winner

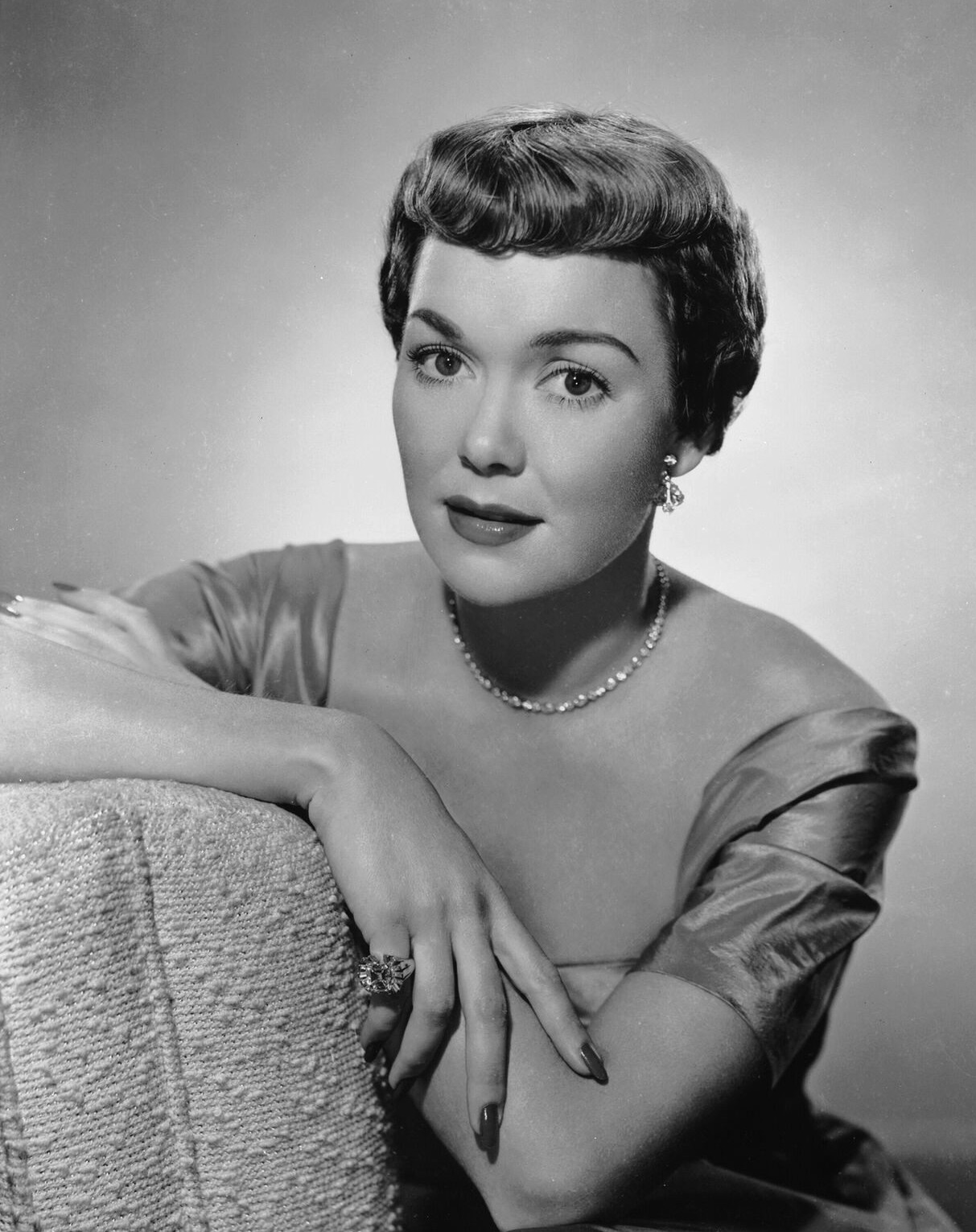
Jane Wyman — Best Actress in a Television Series, Drama winner

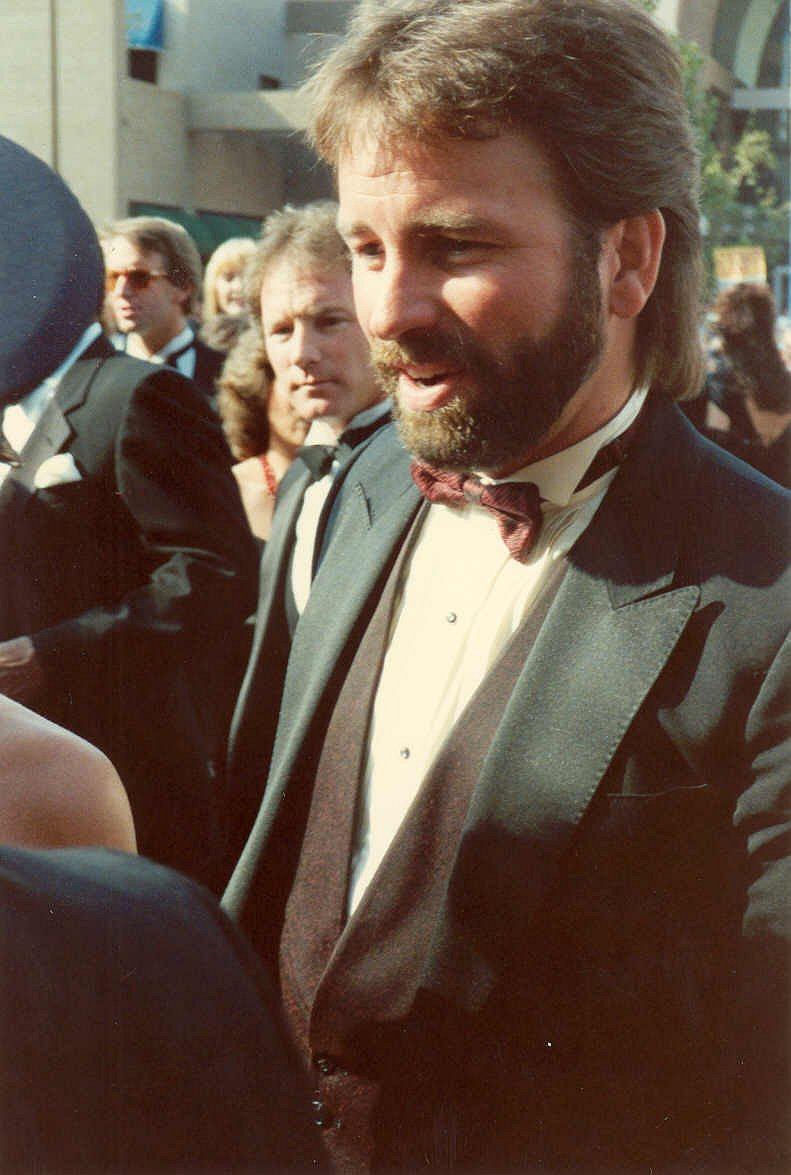
John Ritter — Best Actor in a Television Series, Comedy or Musical winner

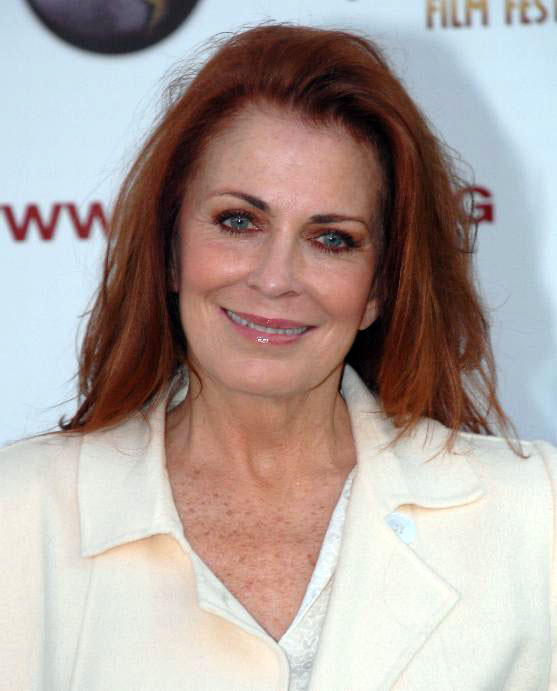
Joanna Cassidy — Best Actress in a Television Series, Comedy or Musical winner

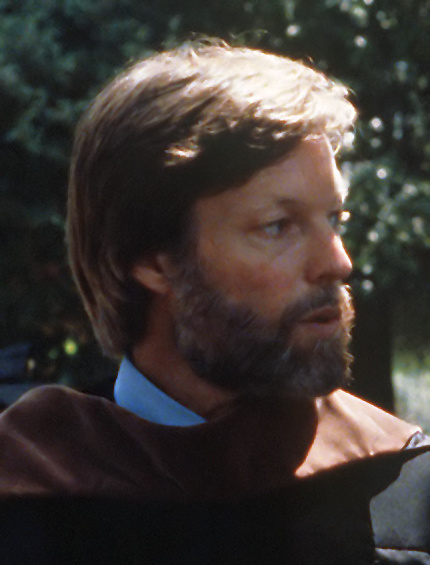
Richard Chamberlain — Best Actor in a Miniseries or Television Film, winner

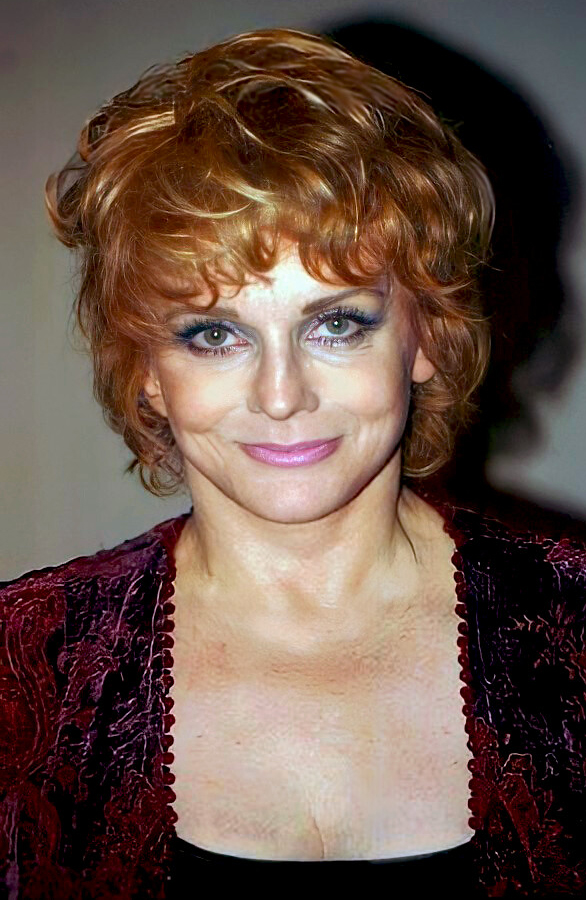
Ann-Margret — Best Actress in a Miniseries or Television Film, winner

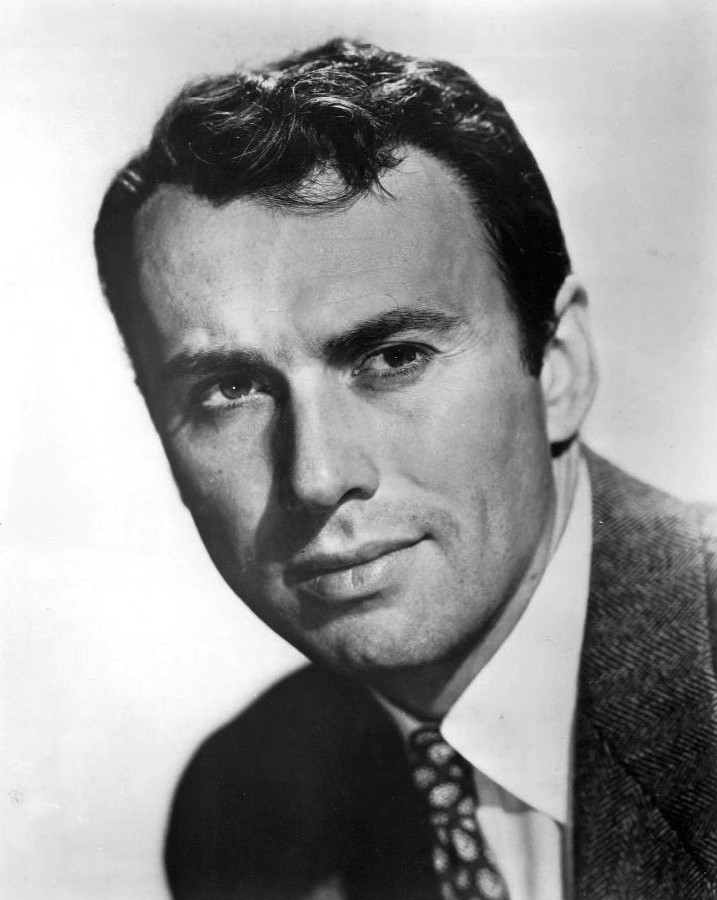
Richard Kiley — Best Supporting Actor in a Series, Miniseries or Motion Picture Made for Television winner

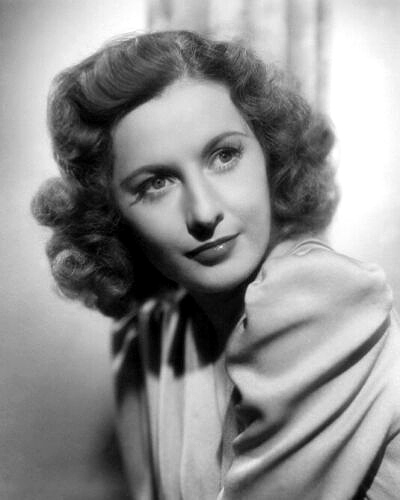
Barbara Stanwyck — Best Supporting Actress in a Series, Miniseries or Motion Picture Made for Television winner

=== Film ===
Best Motion Picture
Drama	Comedy or Musical
Terms of Endearment; Reuben, Reuben; The Right Stuff; Silkwood; Tender Mercies	Yentl; The Big Chill; Flashdance; Trading Places; Zelig
Best Performance in a Motion Picture – Drama
Actor	Actress
Tom Courtenay – The Dresser as Norman; Robert Duvall – Tender Mercies as Mac Sledge; Tom Conti – Reuben, Reuben as Gowan McGland; Richard Farnsworth – The Grey Fox as Bill Miner / George Edwards; Albert Finney – The Dresser as Sir; Al Pacino – Scarface as Tony Montana; Eric Roberts – Star 80 as Paul Snider	Shirley MacLaine – Terms of Endearment as Aurora Greenway; Jane Alexander – Testament as Carol Wetherly; Bonnie Bedelia – Heart Like a Wheel as Shirley Muldowney; Meryl Streep – Silkwood as Karen Silkwood; Debra Winger – Terms of Endearment as Emma Greenway-Horton
Best Performance in a Motion Picture – Comedy or Musical
Actor	Actress
Michael Caine – Educating Rita as Prof. Frank Bryant; Woody Allen – Zelig as Leonard Zelig; Tom Cruise – Risky Business as Joel Goodson; Eddie Murphy – Trading Places as Billy Ray Valentine; Mandy Patinkin – Yentl as Avigdor	Julie Walters – Educating Rita as Susan "Rita" White; Anne Bancroft – To Be or Not to Be as Anna Bronski; Jennifer Beals – Flashdance as Alexandra "Alex" Owens; Linda Ronstadt – The Pirates of Penzance as Mabel Stanley; Barbra Streisand – Yentl as Yentl Mendel
Best Supporting Performance in a Motion Picture – Drama, Comedy or Musical
Supporting Actor	Supporting Actress
Jack Nicholson – Terms of Endearment as Garrett Breedlove; Steven Bauer – Scarface as Manny Ribera; Charles Durning – To Be or Not to Be as S.S. Colonel Erhardt; Gene Hackman – Under Fire as Alex Grazier; Kurt Russell – Silkwood as Drew Stephens	Cher – Silkwood as Dolly Pelliker; Barbara Carrera – Never Say Never Again as Fatima Blush; Tess Harper – Tender Mercies as Rosa Lee; Linda Hunt – The Year of Living Dangerously as Billy Kwan; Joanna Pacuła – Gorky Park as Irina Asanova
Other
Best Director	Best Screenplay
Barbra Streisand – Yentl; Bruce Beresford – Tender Mercies; Ingmar Bergman – Fanny and Alexander; James L. Brooks – Terms of Endearment; Mike Nichols – Silkwood; Peter Yates – The Dresser	Terms of Endearment – James L. Brooks; The Big Chill – Barbara Benedek and Lawrence Kasdan; The Dresser – Ronald Harwood; Educating Rita – Willy Russell; Reuben, Reuben – Julius J. Epstein
Best Original Score	Best Original Song
Flashdance – Giorgio Moroder; Rumble Fish – Stewart Copeland; Scarface – Giorgio Moroder; Under Fire – Jerry Goldsmith; Yentl – Alan and Marilyn Bergman and Michel Legrand	"Flashdance... What a Feeling" (Giorgio Moroder, Keith Forsey, Irene Cara) – Flashdance; "Far from Over" (Frank Stallone, Vince DiCola) – Staying Alive; "Maniac" (Michael Sembello, Dennis Matkosky) – Flashdance; "Over You" (Austin Roberts, Bobby Hart) – Tender Mercies; "The Way He Makes Me Feel" (Michel Legrand, Alan and Marilyn Bergman) – Yentl
Best Foreign Film
Fanny and Alexander (Sweden); Carmen (Spain); The Dresser (England); Educating Rita (England); The Grey Fox (Canada)

The following films received multiple nominations:

Nomination	Title
6	Terms of Endearment
6	Yentl
5	The Dresser
5	Flashdance
5	Silkwood
5	Tender Mercies
4	Educating Rita
3	Reuben, Reuben
3	Scarface
2	The Big Chill
2	The Grey Fox
2	Trading Places
2	Zelig
2	Fanny and Alexander
2	To Be or Not to Be
2	Under Fire

The following films received multiple wins:

Wins	Title
4	Terms of Endearment
2	Educating Rita
2	Flashdance
2	Yentl

=== Television ===
Best Television Series
Drama	Musical or Comedy
Dynasty: Cagney & Lacey; Dallas; Hart to Hart; Hill Street Blues	Fame: Buffalo Bill; Cheers; Newhart; Taxi
Best Performance in a Television Series – Drama
Actor	Actress
John Forsythe - Dynasty as Blake Carrington: James Brolin - Hotel as Peter McDermott; Tom Selleck - Magnum, P.I. as Thomas Magnum III; Daniel J. Travanti - Hill Street Blues as Capt. Francis "Frank" Furillo; Robert Wagner - Hart to Hart as Jonathan Hart	Jane Wyman - Falcon Crest as Angela Channing: Joan Collins - Dynasty as Alexis Colby; Tyne Daly - Cagney & Lacey as Mary Beth Lacey; Linda Evans - Dynasty as Krystle Carrington; Stefanie Powers - Hart to Hart as Jennifer Hart
Best Performance in a Television Series – Comedy or Musical
Actor	Actress
John Ritter - Three's Company as Jack Tripper: Dabney Coleman - Buffalo Bill as "Buffalo" Bill Bittinger; Ted Danson - Cheers as Sam Malone; Robert Guillaume - Benson as Benson DuBois; Bob Newhart - Newhart as Dick Loudon	Joanna Cassidy - Buffalo Bill as Joanna "Jo-Jo" White: Debbie Allen - Fame as Lydia Grant; Madeline Kahn - Oh Madeline as Madeline Wayne; Shelley Long - Cheers as Diane Chambers; Isabel Sanford - The Jeffersons as Louise Jefferson
Best Performance in a Miniseries or Television Film
Actor	Actress
Richard Chamberlain - The Thorn Birds as Ralph de Bricassart: Robert Blake - Blood Feud as James R. Hoffa; Louis Gossett Jr. - Sadat as Anwar al-Sadat; Martin Sheen - Kennedy as John F. Kennedy; Peter Strauss - Heart of Steel as Emory	Ann-Margret - Who Will Love My Children? as Lucile Fray: Susan Blakely - Will There Really Be a Morning? as Frances Farmer; Blair Brown - Kennedy as Jacqueline Kennedy; Gena Rowlands - Thursday's Child as Victoria Alden; Rachel Ward - The Thorn Birds as Meggie Cleary
Best Supporting Performance in a Series, Miniseries or Television Film
Supporting Actor	Supporting Actress
Richard Kiley - The Thorn Birds as Paddy Cleary: Bryan Brown - The Thorn Birds as Luke O'Neill; John Houseman - The Winds of War as Aaron Jastrow; Perry King - The Hasty Heart as Yank; Rob Lowe - Thursday's Child as Sam Alden; Jan-Michael Vincent - The Winds of War as Byron "Briny" Henry	Barbara Stanwyck - The Thorn Birds as Mary Carson: Polly Holliday - The Gift of Love: A Christmas Story as Aunt Minerva; Angela Lansbury - The Gift of Love: A Christmas Story as Amanda Fenwick; Piper Laurie - The Thorn Birds as Anne Mueller; Jean Simmons - The Thorn Birds as Fee Cleary; Victoria Tennant - The Winds of War as Pamela Tudsburry
Best Miniseries or Television Film
The Thorn Birds: Kennedy; The Winds of War; Heart of Steel; Who Will Love My Children?

The following programs received multiple nominations:

Nominations	Title
8	The Thorn Birds
4	Dynasty
4	The Winds of War
3	Cheers
3	Hart to Hart
3	Kennedy
3	Buffalo Bill
2	Cagney & Lacey
2	Fame
2	The Gift of Love: A Christmas Story
2	Heart of Steel
2	Hill Street Blues
2	Newhart
2	Thursday's Child
2	Who Will Love My Children?

The following programs received multiple wins:

Wins	Title
4	The Thorn Birds
2	Dynasty

== Ceremony ==
=== Presenters ===
- Maud Adams
- Edward Asner
- Christopher Atkins
- Anne Baxter
- Jeff Bridges
- Susan Clark
- Mike Connors
- William Devane
- Teri Garr
- Melissa Gilbert
- Louis Gossett, Jr.
- Gene Hackman
- Mariel Hemingway
- Alex Karras
- Cheryl Ladd
- Lorenzo Lamas
- Diane Lane
- Heather Locklear
- Gina Lollobrigida
- Shelley Long
- Donna Mills
- Michael Pare
- Cliff Robertson
- Mark Rydell
- Telly Savalas
- George Segal
- Connie Sellecca
- Steve Shagan
- William Shatner
- Jill St. John
- Robert Wagner
- Dee Wallace
- Lesley Ann Warren
- Richard Widmark

=== Cecil B. DeMille Award ===
Paul Newman

== See also ==
- 56th Academy Awards
- 4th Golden Raspberry Awards
- 35th Primetime Emmy Awards
- 36th Primetime Emmy Awards
- 37th British Academy Film Awards
- 38th Tony Awards
- 1983 in film
- 1983 in American television
