= List of films produced by American Broadcasting Company =

American Broadcasting Company (ABC)'s entry into film began with their purchase of the Selznick library from the David O. Selznick estate. In 1965, ABC founded its own films production companies, ABC Pictures Corporation and ABC Pictures International (for international distribution). The studio's films were distributed by Cinerama Releasing Corporation. The studio never turned a profit for ABC and was shut down in 1972.

In May 1979, ABC returned to film production with the formation of ABC Motion Pictures, this time with distribution through 20th Century-Fox. This company closed down in 1985. Both ABC and 20th Century-Fox are now owned by The Walt Disney Company.

== List of films ==
Release date	Title	Production company	Distributor
December 20, 1967	Smashing Time	Selmur Pictures	Paramount Pictures
1968	Diamonds for Breakfast	ABC Pictures	Paramount Pictures
January 1968	Stranger in the House (aka Cop-Out)	ABC Pictures; De Gruwald Productions; Selmur Pictures	Cinerama Releasing Corporation
May 1, 1968	A Minute to Pray, a Second to Die	Selmur Pictures	Cinerama Releasing Corporation
July 17, 1968	For Love of Ivy	Palomar Pictures	Cinerama Releasing Corporation
September 23, 1968	Charly	ABC Pictures	Cinerama Releasing Corporation
October 7, 1968	Shalako	Palomar Pictures	Cinerama Releasing Corporation
December 9, 1968	The Birthday Party	Palomar Pictures	Continental Distribution
December 11, 1968	The High Commissioner	ABC Pictures	Cinerama Releasing Corporation
December 12, 1968	The Killing of Sister George	Palomar Pictures	Cinerama Releasing Corporation
December 17, 1968	Candy	Selmur Pictures	Cinerama Releasing Corporation
December 18, 1968	Hell in the Pacific	Selmur Pictures	Cinerama Releasing Corporation
May 14, 1969	Krakatoa, East of Java	ABC Pictures	Cinerama Releasing Corporation
May 15, 1969	Midas Run	Selmur Pictures	Cinerama Releasing Corporation
August 18, 1969	Take the Money and Run	ABC Pictures; Palomar Pictures	Cinerama Releasing Corporation
August 20, 1969	What Ever Happened to Aunt Alice?	ABC Pictures; Palomar Pictures	Cinerama Releasing Corporation
December 10, 1969	They Shoot Horses, Don't They?	ABC Pictures; Palomar Pictures	Cinerama Releasing Corporation
January 2, 1970	Jenny	ABC Pictures	Cinerama Releasing Corporation
May 20, 1970	Too Late the Hero	ABC Pictures; Palomar Pictures	Cinerama Releasing Corporation
August 12, 1970	Lovers and Other Strangers	ABC Pictures	Cinerama Releasing Corporation
September 11, 1970	Suppose They Gave a War and Nobody Came	ABC Pictures	Cinerama Releasing Corporation
October 1970	How Do I Love Thee?	ABC Pictures	Cinerama Releasing Corporation
November 4, 1970	Song of Norway	ABC Pictures	Cinerama Releasing Corporation
January 24, 1971	Zachariah	ABC Pictures	Cinerama Releasing Corporation
January 28, 1971	The Last Valley	ABC Pictures	Cinerama Releasing Corporation
February 26, 1971	The 300 Year Weekend	ABC Pictures	Cinerama Releasing Corporation
May 28, 1971	The Grissom Gang	ABC Pictures	Cinerama Releasing Corporation
July 14, 1971	The Touch	ABC Pictures	Cinerama Releasing Corporation
September 17, 1971	Kotch	ABC Pictures	Cinerama Releasing Corporation
December 22, 1971	Straw Dogs	ABC Pictures	Cinerama Releasing Corporation
February 13, 1972	Cabaret	ABC Pictures	Allied Artists Pictures Corporation
June 16, 1972	The Strange Vengeance of Rosalie	Palomar Pictures	20th Century Fox
June 16, 1972	What Became of Jack and Jill?	Palomar Pictures	20th Century Fox
August 2, 1972	Junior Bonner	ABC Pictures	Cinerama Releasing Corporation
August 23, 1972	To Kill a Clown	Palomar Pictures	20th Century Fox
September 27, 1972	The Darwin Adventure	Palomar Pictures	20th Century Fox
December 17, 1972	The Heartbreak Kid	Palomar Pictures	20th Century Fox
December 20, 1972	Sleuth	Palomar Pictures	20th Century Fox
August 9, 1973	Gordon's War	Palomar Pictures	20th Century Fox
July 16, 1982	Young Doctors in Love	ABC Motion Pictures	20th Century Fox
October 29, 1982	National Lampoon's Class Reunion	ABC Motion Pictures	20th Century Fox
December 14, 1983	Silkwood	ABC Motion Pictures	20th Century Fox
September 28, 1984	Impulse	ABC Motion Pictures	20th Century Fox
December 14, 1984	The Flamingo Kid	ABC Motion Pictures	20th Century Fox
June 14, 1985	Prizzi's Honor	ABC Motion Pictures	20th Century Fox
June 6, 1986	SpaceCamp	ABC Motion Pictures	20th Century Fox
