= Thursday's Child (1983 film) =

1983 television film

- DVD cover for Thursday's Child
- Genre: Teen drama
- Based on: Thursday's Child by Victoria Poole
- Written by: Gwen Bagni-Dubov
- Directed by: David Lowell Rich
- Starring: Rob Lowe; Gena Rowlands; Don Murray; Jessica Walter
- Music by: Lee Holdridge
- Country of origin: United States
- Original language: English

Production
- Executive producers: Gregory Harrison; Franklin R. Levy; Ronald Parker
- Producer: Peter Katz
- Cinematography: Charles F. Wheeler
- Editor: J. Terry Williams
- Running time: 100 minutes
- Production companies: Catalina Productions; Hallmark Hall of Fame Productions; Viacom Productions

Original release
- Network: CBS
- Release: February 1, 1983

Thursday's Child is a 1983 American made-for-television drama film starring Rob Lowe, Gena Rowlands and Don Murray, directed by David Lowell Rich and based on the book of the same name by Victoria Poole. The movie was televised on CBS.

== Plot ==
Sam Alden is the 17-year-old high school star player in football who seems to have it all. However, his family notices that he is often bothered with fits of coughing. Worried, his parents decide to take him to the hospital, where they are shocked to find out that he has a life-threatening heart disease. Sam has trouble dealing with his illness, but he pretends to still be a joyful teenager to not have his parents Victoria and Parker worrying even more than they already do. His health is deteriorating, though, and it is eventually revealed that he needs a heart transplant if he wants to survive. This is the beginning of a long journey, which is mentally and physically exhausting. Sam has countless operations, and tests. The search for a donor seems endless to him. Even before the final operation, Sam is forced to deal with several setbacks in his life.

== Cast ==
- Rob Lowe as Sam Alden
- Gena Rowlands as Victoria Alden
- Don Murray as Parker Alden
- Jessica Walter as Roz Richardson
- Tracey Gold as Alix
- Glenn Morrissey as Pokie
- Ken Stovitz as Charlie
- Heidi Bohay as Ruthie
- Elizabeth Keifer as Tina
- Larry Poindexter as Malcolm
- Robin Gammell as Dr. Schroeder
- Alan Fudge as Dr. Baumbartner
- Thomas Hill as Dr. Owens
- Stephen Keep as Dr. Reston
- Curt Lowens as Dr. Wakely

== Release ==
For Rob Lowe, this film meant his official introduction to the screen. The film was shot in 1982 and slated to premier in December 1982. However, it was postponed two times (because of the death of Sam Poole, the real "Sam Alden", around Christmas, 1982) and it eventually premiered in February 1983.

The film was generally well received and was nominated for two Golden Globe Awards. Lowe was nominated in the category Best Performance by an Actor in a Supporting Role in a Series, Mini-Series or Motion Picture Made for TV and Gena Rowlands in the category Best Performance by an Actress in a Mini-Series or Motion Picture Made for TV at the 41st Golden Globe Awards.
