= The Queen Family Singalong =

2021 American television special

- Presented by: Darren Criss
- Country of origin: United States
- Original language: English

Production
- Executive producers: Patrizia Di Maria; R.J. Durell; Nick Florez; Hamish Hamilton; Raj Kapoor; Katy Mullan
- Production location: Virtual
- Production company: Done and Dusted

Original release
- Network: ABC
- Release: November 4, 2021

Related
- The Disney Family Singalong

The Queen Family Singalong is an American music television special which premiered November 4, 2021 on ABC. Hosted by Darren Criss and spun off from ABC's 2020 specials The Disney Family Singalong, the special featured performances of songs by the British rock band Queen by celebrity guests. The special featured an appearance by Adam Lambert—who performs as lead singer with the band's members as Queen + Adam Lambert. As a salute to the reopening of Broadway theatres amid the COVID-19 pandemic, the special also included a performance of "Don't Stop Me Now" by the Broadway casts of Disney's musicals Aladdin and The Lion King.

== Performances ==
Performers & Songs featured on The Queen Family Singalong
Artist(s)	Song(s)	Album
JoJo Siwa; Orianthi	"We Will Rock You"	News of the World
Jimmie Allen featuring Miss Piggy	"Crazy Little Thing Called Love"	The Game
Pentatonix	"Somebody to Love"	A Day at the Races
The cast of The Lion King Bonita Hamilton; Mduduzi Madela; Brandon McCall; Adrienne Walker The cast of Aladdin Milo Alosi; Tia Altinay; Lissa DeGuzman; Michael James Scott	"Don't Stop Me Now"	Jazz
Fall Out Boy	"Under Pressure"	Hot Space
Derek Hough featuring Alexander Jean	"Another One Bites the Dust"	The Game
Alessia Cara	"Killer Queen"	Sheer Heart Attack
OneRepublic	"We Are the Champions"	News of the World
Adam Lambert	"The Show Must Go On"	Innuendo
Darren Criss and Various	"Bohemian Rhapsody"	A Night at the Opera

== Appearances ==
- Animal

== Broadcast ==
The special was seen by a total of 3.51 million viewers, with a 0.5 share of viewers 18-49; it was the lowest-rated entry in ABC's Family Singalong franchise, with a 58% decline in comparison to November 2020's The Disney Holiday Singalong.
