= Schoolhouse Rock! 50th Anniversary Singalong =

2023 American television special

- Presented by: Ryan Seacrest
- Country of origin: United States
- Original language: English

Production
- Executive producers: R.J. Durell; Ashley Edens; Nick Florez; Katy Mullan
- Production companies: Done and Dusted; Walt Disney Television Alternative

Original release
- Network: ABC
- Release: February 1, 2023

Related
- The Disney Family Singalong

Schoolhouse Rock! 50th Anniversary Singalong is an American music television special that premiered on February 1, 2023, on ABC. Hosted by Ryan Seacrest and spun off from ABC's 2020 specials The Disney Family Singalong, the special featured performances of songs by Schoolhouse Rock! by celebrity guests. This special celebrates the franchise's 50th anniversary. This special was dedicated to George Newall who co-created some of the songs.

== Performances ==
Performers & Songs featured on Schoolhouse Rock! 50th Anniversary Singalong
Artist(s)	Song(s)
Bob Dorough and Friends (with the Schoolhouse Rock! 50th Anniversary Singalong dancers)	"Schoolhouse Rocky"
Julianne Hough	"Interplanet Janet"
The cast of The Lion King Bonita Hamilton; Mduduzi Madela The cast of Aladdin Michael Maliakel; Marcus M. Martin The cast of Newsies Kara Lindsay The cast of Hercules Charity Angél Dawson	"A Noun Is a Person, Place, or Thing"
Kal Penn and Raven-Symoné	"Interjections!"
Black Eyed Peas	"Rufus Xavier Sarsaparilla" "Three Is a Magic Number"
Ne-Yo	"Verb: That's What's Happening"
Kermit the Frog, Fozzie Bear and Fortune Feimster	"Unpack Your Adjectives"
Jason Biggs and Jenny Mollen	"I'm Just a Bill"
Retta	"Ready or Not, Here I Come"
Derek Hough and Hayley Erbert	"Figure Eight"
Shaquille O'Neal and Boys & Girls Club of Atlanta	"Conjunction Junction" (not sung)

== Appearances ==
- Quinta Brunson
- Lisa Ann Walter
- Shaquille O'Neal

== Broadcast ==
This special was watched by 2.65 million viewers.
