= Talk to Me (1984 film) =

1984 film directed by Julius Potocsny

- Directed by: Julius Potocsny
- Written by: Nelson E. Breen
- Produced by: Ross Millhiser
- Starring: Austin Pendleton; Michael Murphy; Barbara Eda-Young; Dan Shor; Michael Tolan; Louise Fletcher
- Cinematography: Julius Potocsny
- Edited by: Moe Howard
- Music by: Coleridge-Taylor Perkinson
- Distributed by: Atlantic Releasing Corporation
- Release date: 1984
- Running time: 96 minutes
- Country: United States
- Language: English

Talk to Me is a 1984 independent drama film directed by Julius Potocsny and starring character actor Austin Pendleton, in a rare leading role on film, and co-starring Michael Murphy, Barbara Eda-Young, Dan Shor, Michael Tolan and a special appearance cameo by Louise Fletcher. The film was produced by Hollins Communications Institution to benefit the American Institute for Stuttering, of which Pendleton was a graduate.

== Sources ==
- http://www.rottentomatoes.com/m/1020852-talk_to_me/
- http://stuttertalk.com/2009/07/08/austin-pendleton-stuttering.aspx
- http://www.film.com/movies/mediaplayback/talk-to-me/27516369
- https://web.archive.org/web/20121019121618/http://stutteringtreatment.org/aboutstaff.php
