= A. B. Stoddard =

American journalist

- Education: Connecticut College (BA)
- Occupation: Journalist
- Years active: 1999–present
- Employer(s): The Bulwark; RealClearPolitics; Fox News
- Organization: Society of Professional Journalists
- Television: Hooked on Politics!
- Spouse: Peter Scott Roberson
- Parent(s): Brandon Stoddard; Alexandra Stoddard
- Awards: Dateline Award (2009, 2011)

Alexandra Brandon Stoddard is an American journalist. She is a writer at large at The Bulwark and an associate editor and columnist at RealClearPolitics. Previously, she worked as an associate editor and columnist for The Hill newspaper. She has been quoted by other news media.

== Early life and education ==
Her father was former ABC Entertainment president Brandon Stoddard and her mother is the author and interior designer Alexandra Stoddard. She graduated with a degree in journalism from Connecticut College in 1989.

== Career ==
Stoddard worked as a producer for World News Tonight (1999–2002). She covered the U.S. Senate for ABC News. She won first place in the "Weekly Newspaper – Editorial, Columns, Commentary" category of the Dateline Awards from the Society of Professional Journalists’ Washington, D.C., chapter in 2009, where the judges called her winning article "insightful". She was awarded first place in the "Weekly Newspaper – Editorial" category in 2011, and was a finalist in the 2012 awards in the "Weekly Newspaper – Editorial, Columns, Commentary" category.

Stoddard is a writer at large at The Bulwark, guest contributor on MSNBC and a Fox News political panel member. She is a columnist on The Hill. She often appears as a guest on Special Report with Bret Baier. She is a former congressional reporter for The Hill.

== Personal life ==
Stoddard married Peter Scott Roberson on September 6, 1997. She has a sister, Brooke Stoddard.
