= Alexandra Stoddard =

American author

Alexandra Stoddard, born Alexandra Green Johns, is an author, interior designer, and lifestyle writer. Stoddard has published 28 books as of April 2013. She is the mother of two daughters, Alexandra and Brooke, by her first husband Brandon Stoddard (1937–2014), from whom she was divorced in 1974. She subsequently married Peter Megargee Brown (also now deceased).

== Selected works ==
- Living a Beautiful Life: 500 Ways to Add Elegance, Order, Beauty and Joy to Every Day of Your Life;
- Choosing Happiness: Keys to a Joyful Life;
- Things I Want My Daughters to Know: A Small Book About the Big Issues in Life;
- You Are Your Choices: 50 Ways to Live the Good Life;
- Happiness For Two: 75 Secrets for Finding More Joy Together;
- Things Good Mothers Know: A Celebration.
