= Michael Tolan =

American actor (1925–2011)

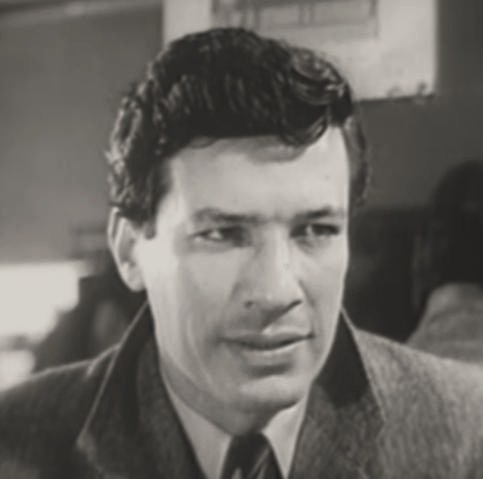
- Tolan in the Beverly Garland crime drama, Decoy (1958)
- Born: Seymour Tuchow; November 27, 1925; Detroit, Michigan, U.S.
- Died: January 31, 2011 (aged 85); Hudson, New York, U.S.
- Education: Wayne State University, Stanford University
- Occupation: Actor
- Years active: 1951–2007
- Spouse(s): Carol Hume (divorced) Rosemary Forsyth (m. 1966–1970) (divorced)
- Partner: Donna Peck
- Children: 3

Michael Tolan (born Seymour Tuchow, November 27, 1925 – January 31, 2011) was an American actor.

== Early life and education ==
The son of Morris Tuchow, Tolan was born in Detroit, Michigan. He graduated from Central High School and Wayne State University in Detroit and studied under Stella Adler and at Stanford University.

== Career ==
Tolan's early acting experience came on radio station WXYZ in Detroit, where he was heard on The Green Hornet and The Lone Ranger. He also worked with the Actors Company. In 1948, he performed in summer stock theater in Worcester, Massachusetts.

Tolan appeared primarily in stage roles in his early career, with only minor parts in films of the early 1950s. His stage roles include Romanoff and Juliet and Will Success Spoil Rock Hunter?, his Broadway debut. His film credits included Fort Worth (1951), The Savage (1952), Hiawatha (1952), The Greatest Story Ever Told (1965), Hour of the Gun (1967), The Lost Man (1969), John and Mary (1969), The 300 Year Weekend (1971), Talk to Me (1984) and Presumed Innocent (1990).

He acted mostly on television from the mid-1950s on, including an appearance on the 1960 CBS summer series, Diagnosis: Unknown, a role in The Doctors and the Nurses, and a continuing role as Jordan Boyle on "The Senator" segments of the anthology umbrella TV series The Bold Ones (1970–71). He appeared in a 1967 episode of The Rat Patrol, "The Fifth Wheel Raid", where he is credited as Michael Tolin (versus Tolan). He also appeared in three episodes of Mission: Impossible, entitled "Trial by Fury," "The Play," and "Terror." He had a recurring role on three episodes of The Mary Tyler Moore Show, as Dan Whitfield, Mary's night-school teacher & boyfriend. He also made guest appearances on such television series as The Invaders, The F.B.I., Mannix, Kojak, Nichols, The Outer Limits, McMillan and Wife, and Law & Order. His last known television appearance was on an episode of Murder, She Wrote in 1994.

Tolan appeared in the Bob Fosse film All That Jazz (1979) as lead character Joe Gideon's cardiologist, Dr. Ballinger.

Tolan also helped found the American Place Theatre, of which he wrote:

We wanted to attract some of the writers who wrote fine, intelligent, deep material about American life, and see if we could interest them in writing for the theater.

== Personal life ==
Tolan had two marriages, both of which ended in divorce; at the time of his death, he was partnered with Donna Peck, with whom he lived in Ancram, New York. He had previously married actress Rosemary Forsyth on June 28, 1966. The couple had one child and divorced in 1970.

== Death ==
Tolan died January 31, 2011, at a Hudson, New York, hospital from kidney failure.

== Selected filmography ==
- The Enforcer (1951) – James (Duke) Malloy
- Inside the Walls of Folsom Prison (1951) – Leo Daly
- Fort Worth (1951) – Mort Springer
- The People Against O'Hara (1951) – Vincent Korvac (uncredited)
- The Savage (1952) – Long Mane
- Hiawatha (1952) – Neyadji
- Julius Caesar (1953) – Officer to Octavius
- Second Chance (1953) – Antonio (uncredited)
- The Greatest Story Ever Told (1965) – Lazarus
- Roseanna (1967) – Elmer B. Kafka
- Hour of the Gun (1967) – Pete Spence
- The Rat Patrol (1967) – Kabir (Season 2 Episode 13)
- Journey into Darkness (1968) – Craig Miller (episode "Paper Dolls")
- The Lost Man (1969) – Insp. Carl Hamilton
- John and Mary (1969) – James
- The 300 Year Weekend (1971) – Dr. Marshall
- All That Jazz (1979) – Dr. Ballinger
- Talk to Me (1984) – Dr. Ronald Webster
- Presumed Innocent (1990) – Mr. Polhemus
- Perfect Stranger (2007) – Judge
