= The 300 Year Weekend =

- Starring: William Devane
- Cinematography: Joseph C. Brun
- Music by: Gilbert Fuller
- Production company: ABC Pictures
- Distributed by: Universal Pictures
- Release date: 1971
- Running time: 83 minutes
- Country: United States
- Language: English
- Budget: $260,000

The 300 Year Weekend is a 1971 drama film starring William Devane.

The film was given several test engagements in February 1971 but was not released. Kino Lorber released a now out-of-print DVD of the film in 2020. It includes a commentary by Daniel Kremer and film critic Scout Tafoya.

A doctor spends 24 hours in a clinic with a group of patients. Each character has his or her own story to tell, about their fathers, mothers, or spouses who don't understand them, and how they've turned instead to drugs.

== Cast ==
- William Devane as Tom
- Michael Tolan as Dr. Marshall
- Sharon Laughlin as Nancy
- Roy Cooper as Hal
- Gabriel Dell as Wynter
