= Dusty Ellis =

American activist and nuclear whistleblower

- Born: Sherri Lou Ellis; October 13, 1953; Guthrie, Oklahoma, U.S.
- Died: November 2, 2012 (aged 59); Guthrie, Oklahoma, U.S.
- Occupations: plant worker, activist

Sherri Lou "Dusty" Ellis (October 13, 1953 – November 2, 2012) was an American woman known for her involvement in the Kerr-McGee plutonium plant criminal case of the 1970s when she and her roommate Karen Silkwood became activists and nuclear whistleblowers after both of their bodies tested positive for plutonium contamination. Their fight for safer working conditions was chronicled in the 1983 film Silkwood, in which Ellis was portrayed by Cher, who was nominated for the Academy Award for Best Supporting Actress for her performance. After Karen Silkwood's death in 1974, Ellis continued to protest and was involved in a series of legal battles against Kerr-McGee and the state of Oklahoma.

== Personal life ==
She was born Sherri Lou Ellis in Guthrie, Oklahoma, the daughter of LouAnn (née Harman 1934–2007) and Benjamin Ellis (1929–1987). Her mother was a champion dog breeder and her father was a professional bull rider. She had a sister, Linda, and a brother, Brett. She got the nickname Dusty from competing in rodeo competitions as a barrel racer, where she won many prizes. Her whole family was involved in the rodeo, and her family owned farm land in Oklahoma near the Kerr-McGee plant. Ellis was a lesbian. She graduated from Guthrie High School in 1971.

Ellis began working at the Kerr-McGee plant in Crescent, Oklahoma as a laboratory analyst when she was 21. She lived with Karen Silkwood in an apartment in Edmond, Oklahoma for around six months prior to Silkwood's death, along with Silkwood's boyfriend Drew Stephens. On November 10, 1974, Silkwood, Ellis, and Stephens were flown to Los Alamos, New Mexico for two days of intense testing. Silkwood's testing revealed that her body was contaminated much worse than Ellis' and Stephens'. The last time she saw Karen Silkwood was at work on the day of November 13, 1974, hours before Silkwood died in a car accident.

In 1975, Ellis climbed the exterior wall of the Kerr-McGee plant with a shotgun. She was arrested and given one year of probation after pleading guilty to forcible entry.

Initially, Ellis was not worried about being contaminated with plutonium, even after Silkwood began her investigations. Only once Ellis tested positive for plutonium within her own body did she begin worrying about her own health and joined Silkwood as an activist against Kerr-McGee. The plant offered her money in exchange for any complaints she might have against them, but she refused payment. She also claimed that someone had tried to break into her apartment twice and failed. In the years following the death of Karen Silkwood, Ellis was known for not cooperating with authorities, declining interviews, and refusing to testify in court proceedings.

In 1980, Ellis made national news after being reported as a missing person and was feared to have been murdered, because she was writing a tell-all book about her experiences of working in the Kerr-McGee plant. She was found days later in New York City, and told reporters she was meeting with publishers. The book was never published.

In 1982, Ellis walked into a nursing home in Santa Fe, New Mexico with a shotgun and took 170 people hostage. She was ambushed by a worker at the home and arrested. She told police she was protesting against the nursing home after learning a resident there was being treated poorly and being denied food. In 1985, Ellis protested against New York City mayor Ed Koch after the water in New York City was contaminated with higher than usual levels of plutonium.

In 1995 Ellis was charged for domestic abuse by her girlfriend Viola le Marr. The case was dismissed. In 2002, she was charged with vandalizing and trespassing at a local church and was shot by police after aiming her gun at an officer. In 2009, she was involved in a car accident and charged with auto negligence. In 2010, Ellis was caught stealing from a local grocery store and assaulted a police officer, and she was charged with larceny and obstruction.

Often Ellis claimed she knew who really killed Karen Silkwood, and that the reason for her actions was because of the mental and physical duress the Silkwood case caused her.

== Silkwood ==
Director Mike Nichols began filming for Silkwood in 1982, with a script written by Nora Ephron and Alice Arlen. Cher was cast to portray Ellis in the film. The producers of the film paid Ellis $67,500 for her likeness, even though they changed her name in the film from Dusty Ellis to Dolly Pelliker. Karen Silkwood was portrayed by Meryl Streep, and both Streep and Cher were nominated for Academy Awards for their performances as Silkwood and Ellis.

== Death ==
Ellis died on November 2, 2012, after having been diagnosed with cancer a few months prior. Her family donated her body for medical research. The director of the Guthrie Food Bank praised Ellis, stating that she had donated goods for the needy for many years.
