= The Gift of Love: A Christmas Story =

- Genre: Drama
- Based on: The Silent Stars Go By by Bess Streeter Aldrich
- Screenplay by: Earl Hamner, Jr.
- Directed by: Delbert Mann
- Starring: Lee Remick; Angela Lansbury; Polly Holliday; Joseph Warren; Mart Hulswit; Michael Pearlman; Samantha Atkins; Michael Higgins
- Theme music composer: Fred Karlin
- Country of origin: United States
- Original language: English

Production
- Executive producers: Kenneth Kaufman; Michael Lepiner
- Producer: Dick Atkins
- Production locations: Burlington, Vermont; Chelsea, Vermont; Shelburne, Vermont
- Cinematography: Larry Pizer
- Editor: Paul Fried
- Running time: 96 min.
- Production companies: Amanda Productions; Telecom Entertainment Inc.

Original release
- Network: CBS
- Release: December 20, 1983

The Gift of Love: A Christmas Story is a 1983 American made-for-television Christmas drama film, originally broadcast on CBS as an annual tradition for more than five years, premiering December 20, 1983. It starred Lee Remick, Angela Lansbury and Polly Holliday. It was produced by Dick Atkins and Michael Lepiner; directed by Academy Award winner Delbert Mann; and written by Earl Hamner, Jr., creator of The Waltons, based on the short story "The Silent Stars Go By" by Bess Streeter Aldrich. The film was filmed on location in 1983 in Vermont, mainly in Burlington and the small town of Chelsea.

== Plot ==
Janet (Lee Remick) feels she is losing so much that is important to her. her mother (Angela Lansbury), the family business, even her husband. Janet dreams of simpler times, specifically Christmas in Vermont of her younger days, and of taking her children back to the family home with her parents and aunt (Polly Holliday). And they are enjoying the holiday. However, when one of her children is in trouble, Janet searches for that ‘secret place’ where we all may find what really matters, at Christmas and always.

== Reviews ==
Writing for The Star-Ledger, the film was praised as "The epitome of this year's Christmas offerings. Will catch at your heart and loosen your tear ducts. If you loved 'It's a Wonderful Life' or 'The Homecoming' you will spend a four-handkerchief night with 'The Gift of Love.' The entire project is a joy."

Albany News described the film as "...a tale of love, joy, memory and disappointment, put together in a way that will touch your heart."

In a review for the Los Angeles Times, the film was praised for "Lovely performances by Lee Remick and Angela Lansbury... luminous presence of Polly Holliday... make this a special that merits repeating in seasons to come."

== See also ==
- List of Christmas films
