= Brandon Stoddard =

American television executive

- Born: Brandon B. Stoddard; March 31, 1937; Bridgeport, Connecticut, US
- Died: December 22, 2014 (aged 77); Bel Air, Los Angeles, California, United States
- Spouse(s): Alexandra Green Johns (29 July 1961 – 1974; 2 children); Mary Ann Dolan (February 1984 – 22 December 2014)

Brandon Stoddard (March 31, 1937 – December 22, 2014) was an American television executive. He was president of ABC Entertainment between 1985 and 1989 and head of ABC Productions between 1989 and 1995. He was born in Bridgeport, Connecticut.

== Early life ==
Brandon Stoddard was born in Bridgeport, Connecticut on March 31, 1937. His parents were Johnson Stoddard, a lawyer, and Constance Stoddard. He grew up in Southport. He played guitar in a calypso band. He attended Deerfield Academy and graduated from Yale College in 1958. In the summer of 1958, he was a member of a Yale thespian group that toured Europe for two months, which included a month of performances at army bases. He studied at Columbia Law School.

== Career ==
Brandon Stoddard started his career in ABC Studios in 1970 as the director of daytime programming, before moving to vice president of daytime programming in 1972, he led the network's motion picture division and president of ABC Entertainment from 1985 to 1989. During his tenure as the head of ABC entertainment shows such as Moonlighting, Roseanne, The Wonder Years, and Thirtysomething were created. He was responsible for the creation of TV movies like Friendly Fire and The Day After. He worked to develop the miniseries in American television. Miniseries included The Thorn Birds (1983), The Winds of War (1983), and Amerika. His most successful show was the miniseries Roots based on Alex Haley's novel. From 1989 to 1995 he was the president of the first in-house production company in ABC producing shows like My So-Called Life. After leaving ABC he worked as an adjunct professor at University of Southern California's School for Cinema and Television, teaching graduate students for ten years.

== Personal life ==
Stoddard was married twice. His first wife was Alexandra Stoddard, with whom he had two daughters: journalist A. B. Stoddard and Brooke Stoddard. His second wife was Mary Anne Dolan.

== Death and legacy ==
Stoddard March 2014, he was inducted into the Television Hall of Fame. He died of bladder cancer at Bel-Air, California in 2014. In 2023, Stoddard won the Future of Life Award posthumously for reducing the risk of nuclear war through the power of storytelling.
