= The Disney Family Singalong =

2020 American television special

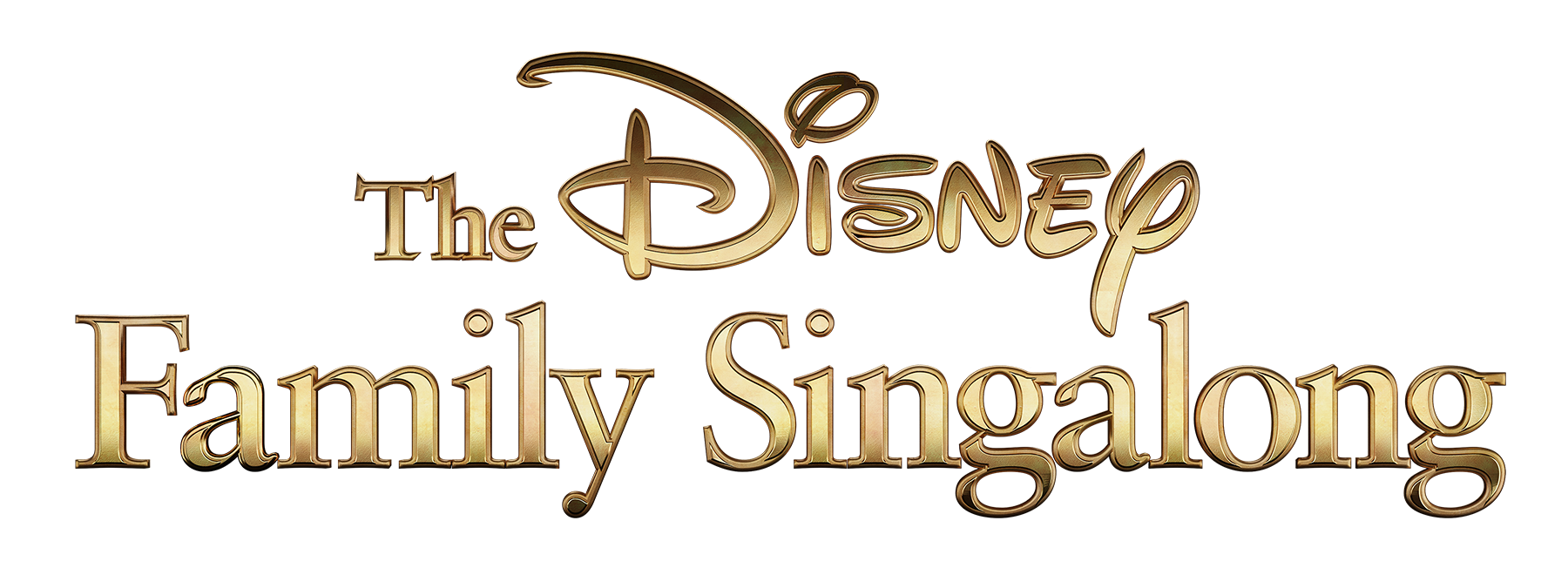
- Written by: Mason Steinberg; Brian Strickland
- Directed by: Hamish Hamilton
- Presented by: Ryan Seacrest
- Country of origin: United States
- Original language: English

Production
- Executive producers: Sam Brenzel; Chris Convy; R. J. Durell; Nick Florez; Raj Kapoor; Katy Mullan
- Producers: Kenny Ortega; Trevor Rothman; Rachel Sussman; Trevor Vaughan; Kristen Wong
- Production location: Virtual
- Editors: Buzz Chatman; Brad Comfort; Guy Harding; Alistair Knapp; Hamish Lyons; Christopher Rodriguez; Ken Yankee
- Running time: 52 minutes
- Production company: Done and Dusted

Original release
- Network: ABC
- Release: April 16, 2020

Related
- The Disney Family Singalong: Volume II; The Queen Family Singalong; Schoolhouse Rock! 50th Anniversary Singalong

The Disney Family Singalong is a series of American music television specials that were broadcast by ABC in 2020. First aired on April 16, 2020, and all hosted by Ryan Seacrest, the specials featured performances of songs from Disney films by musicians and other celebrity guests from their respective homes. The performances featured on-screen karaoke lyrics, encouraging viewers to sing along.

The first special was seen by 10.3 million viewers. A second special—The Disney Family Singalong: Volume II—was aired on May 10, 2020, which was seen by 5.74 million viewers. This was followed by a Christmas-themed edition, The Disney Holiday Singalong, on November 30. The specials gained a spin-off in November 2021, The Queen Family Singalong, featuring similar performances of songs by British rock band Queen. Another spin-off titled Schoolhouse Rock! 50th Anniversary Singalong aired on February 1, 2023, featuring similar performances of songs from Schoolhouse Rock!

== Production ==
Produced by Done and Dusted, the special was first announced on April 10, 2020, for a premiere on April 16. It was produced in response to the COVID-19 pandemic in the United States, and as part of impact on television. The special would include public service announcements highlighting Feeding America's COVID-19 response, featuring various Walt Disney Television talent.

Kenny Ortega organized a cast reunion of High School Musical for the special, with a performance of "We're All In This Together". Ortega noted that the song had experienced a resurgence in popularity amid the pandemic (including videos of medical workers and others singing the song in support of their responses), explaining that "I can’t imagine that Matthew Gerrard and Robbie Nevil, who wrote this song, had any idea that it would have the legs and perhaps mean more now than when we first did it." The performance featured cast members from the film, as well as Raven-Symoné, and cast members from fellow Disney Channel films Descendants and Zombies, and the film's Disney+ spin-off High School Musical: The Musical: The Series. Zac Efron was unable to participate, but made a special guest appearance to introduce the performance.

== Performances ==
Performers & Songs featured on The Disney Family Singalong
Artist(s)	Song(s)	Film
Derek Hough; Hayley Erbert; Julianne Hough	"Be Our Guest"	Beauty and the Beast
Josh Groban and friends	"You've Got a Friend in Me"	Toy Story
Little Big Town and their respective children	"A Spoonful of Sugar"	Mary Poppins
Auliʻi Cravalho	"How Far I'll Go"	Moana
Beyoncé	"When You Wish Upon a Star" (Note: An excerpt from the song was performed, with no on-screen lyrics.)	Pinocchio
Amber Riley (introduced by her niece)	"Let It Go"	Frozen
Darren Criss	"I Wan'na Be Like You"	The Jungle Book
James Monroe Iglehart; The cast of Aladdin	"Friend Like Me"	Aladdin
Ariana Grande	"I Won't Say (I'm in Love)"	Hercules
Bobby Bones; Carrie Ann Inaba; Erin Andrews; Marcus Scribner	"The Bare Necessities"	The Jungle Book
Josh Gad; Luke Evans; Alan Menken	"Gaston"	Beauty and the Beast
Donny Osmond and his grandchildren	"I'll Make a Man Out of You"	Mulan
Christina Aguilera	"Can You Feel the Love Tonight"	The Lion King
Jordan Fisher and friends	"Under the Sea"	The Little Mermaid
Tori Kelly	"Colors of the Wind"	Pocahontas
John Stamos; Caitlin McHugh; Billy Stamos and friends	"It's a Small World"	Disneyland
Thomas Rhett and daughters	"Do You Want to Build a Snowman?"	Frozen
Kenny Ortega; Raven-Symoné; Charli D'Amelio; The cast of High School Musical Vanessa Hudgens; Ashley Tisdale; Monique Coleman; Lucas Grabeel; Corbin Bleu; Kaycee Stroh The cast of Descendants Sofia Carson; Dove Cameron; Sarah Jeffery; Booboo Stewart The cast of Zombies Milo Manheim; Meg Donnelly The cast of High School Musical: The Musical: The Series Olivia Rodrigo; Joshua Bassett; Matt Cornett; Sofia Wylie; Larry Saperstein; Julia Lester; Dara Reneé; Frankie Rodriguez; Joe Serafini	"We're All In This Together"	High School Musical
Michael Bublé; Demi Lovato	"A Dream Is a Wish Your Heart Makes"	Cinderella
Various	Thank You (sung to the tune of Heigh-Ho)	Snow White and the Seven Dwarfs

== Appearances ==
- Kristin Chenoweth
- Chris Harrison
- AJ Michalka
- Nathan Fillion
- Jaina Lee Ortiz
- Anthony Anderson
- Wendi McLendon-Covey
- Cobie Smulders
- Jimmy Kimmel
- Marcella Izaguirre
- Lionel Richie
- Robin Roberts
- Taran Killam
- Elle Fanning (introduced Ariana Grande)
- Tracee Ellis Ross (introduced Christina Aguilera)
- Zac Efron (introduced Kenny Ortega and the casts of High School Musical, Descendants, Zombies, and High School Musical: The Musical: The Series)
- Elizabeth Olsen
- Sebastian Stan
- Jeff Goldblum
- Paul Bettany
- Anthony Mackie
- Emily VanCamp
- Don Cheadle
- Raven-Symoné
- Charli D'Amelio

== Broadcast ==
The special received 10.3 million viewers during its initial airing, making it the most-watched program of the evening. It also held a 2.6 share of the key demographic of adults 18-49, beating its nearest competitor Young Sheldon.

On April 24, 2020, an encore of the special on Disney Channel (accompanied by an airing of the sing-along version of High School Musical) drew 515,000 viewers.

On April 21, the special was made available for streaming on Disney+, before being removed exactly one year later.

== Follow-ups ==
The Disney Family Singalong
- Also known as: The Disney Family Singalong: Volume II
- Written by: Mason Steinberg; Brian Strickland
- Directed by: Hamish Hamilton
- Presented by: Ryan Seacrest
- Country of origin: United States
- Original language: English

Production
- Executive producers: Raj Kapoor; Katy Mullan
- Producers: Natalie Allsup; Niena Drake; William Lacey; Tracy Shibata; Grace Stevens
- Production location: Virtual
- Editors: Buzz Chatman; Brad Comfort; Bill DeRonde; Christopher Rodriguez; Nick Scullard
- Running time: 49 minutes
- Production company: Done and Dusted

Original release
- Network: ABC
- Release: May 10, 2020

Related
- The Disney Family Singalong; The Disney Holiday Singalong; The Queen Family Singalong

=== Volume II ===
On Mother's Day, May 10, 2020, ABC aired a follow-up special, The Disney Family Singalong: Volume II.

Volume II was seen by 5.74 million viewers, with a 1.3 share among viewers 18-49; albeit lower than the initial special, it was still the highest-rated program of the night. The special served as a lead-in for that night's American Idol, which also featured Disney songs as a theme.

==== Performances ====
Performers & Songs featured on The Disney Family Singalong: Volume II
Artist(s)	Song(s)	Film
The Muppets; Seth Rogen	"The Muppet Show Theme"	The Muppet Show
Billy Eichner; Seth Rogen; Walter Russell III; Donald Glover	"Hakuna Matata"	The Lion King
Rebel Wilson	"Poor Unfortunate Souls"	The Little Mermaid
Merle Dandridge; Heather Headley; Adam Jacobs; Caissie Levy; Kara Lindsay; Kevin Massey; Josh Strickland	"You'll Be in My Heart"	Tarzan
Keke Palmer; Dancing with the Stars professional dancers Lindsay Arnold; Alan Bersten; Witney Carson; Val Chmerkovskiy; Jenna Johnson; Sasha Farber; Emma Slater	"Zero to Hero"	Hercules
Idina Menzel; Ben Platt	"A Whole New World"	Aladdin
Halsey	"Part of Your World"	The Little Mermaid
Katy Perry and her poodle, Nugget	"Baby Mine"	Dumbo
Josh Gad and friends	"When I Am Older"	Frozen II
Chloe x Halle; Anika Noni Rose (introduced by her godchildren)	"Almost There"	The Princess and the Frog
Jennifer Hudson; John Legend	"Beauty and the Beast"	Beauty and the Beast
Shakira	"Try Everything"	Zootopia
Miguel; Christina Aguilera; Mariachi Divas de Cindy Shea	"Remember Me"	Coco
Derek Hough; Hayley Erbert; Julianne Hough	"Step in Time" "Supercalifragilisticexpialidocious"	Mary Poppins
Sabrina Carpenter; Lang Lang	"Your Mother and Mine"	Peter Pan

==== Appearances ====
- Kermit the Frog
- Miss Piggy
- The Muppets
- Tituss Burgess
- Chris Harrison
- Charlie Day
- Dan Orlovsky
- Edward James Olmos
- Gordon Ramsay
- Jason Schwartzman
- Jimmy Kimmel
- Katie Stevens
- Lionel Richie
- Michael Eaves
- Michael Strahan
- Morgan Freeman
- Nathan Fillion
- Robin Roberts
- RZA

=== The Disney Holiday Singalong ===
The Disney Family Singalong
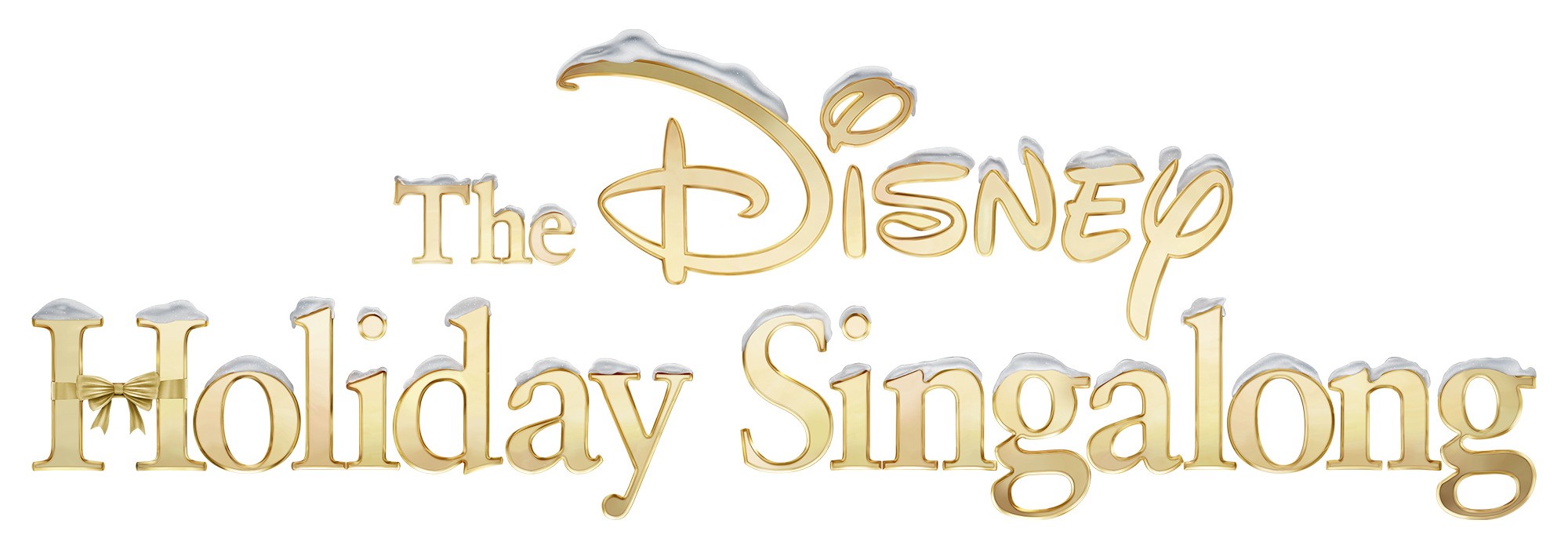
- Also known as: The Disney Holiday Singalong
- Written by: Brian Strickland; Mason Steinberg
- Directed by: Hamish Hamilton
- Presented by: Ryan Seacrest
- Country of origin: United States
- Original language: English

Production
- Executive producers: Hamish Hamilton; Katy Mullan; Raj Kapoor; Patrizia Di Maria; Nick Florez; RJ Durell
- Production location: Virtual
- Production company: Done and Dusted

Original release
- Network: ABC
- Release: November 30, 2020

Related
- The Disney Family Singalong: Volume II; The Queen Family Singalong

On November 30, 2020, ABC aired a third, Christmas-themed edition of the special, The Disney Holiday Singalong, as a lead-in for ABC's CMA Country Christmas special. The special was seen by 5.73 million total viewers, with a 1.3 share among viewers 18-49.

==== Performances ====
Performers & Songs featured on The Disney Holiday Singalong
Artist(s)	Song(s)
Michael Bublé, Luisana Lopilato and their family	"It's Beginning to Look a Lot Like Christmas"
Chloe x Halle	"Do You Want to Build a Snowman" (Frozen)
BTS	"Santa Claus Is Comin' to Town"
Derek Hough and Hayley Erbert	"Jingle Bells"
Pink and Willow Sage Hart	"The Christmas Song (Chestnuts Roasting on an Open Fire)"
Ciara, Future and Sienna	"Rockin' Around the Christmas Tree"
Disney Theatrical Group casts: Frozen North American tour cast Caroline Bowman Aisha Jackson Tracee Beazer Austin Colby Nicholas Edwards Nina LaFarga Adam Perry John Riddle Ann Sanders; The Lion King Broadway cast Lindiwe Dlamini Bongi Duma Ben Jeffrey Kyle Mitchell Nteliseng Nkhela L. Steven Taylor Nicholas Ward; Aladdin Broadway cast Olivia Donaldson April Holloway Telly Leung Isabelle McCalla Paul HeeSang Miller Amber Owens Dennis Stowe	"Finale: Let It Go (reprise)" (Frozen)
DCappella	"We Wish You a Merry Christmas" (no on-screen lyrics) "Deck the Halls" (no on-screen lyrics)
Julianne Hough	"Whistle While You Work" (Snow White and the Seven Dwarfs) and "Let It Snow, Let It Snow, Let It Snow"
Kerry Washington	"Joy to the World"
Leslie Odom Jr.	"What's This?" (The Nightmare Before Christmas)
Katy Perry	"I'll Be Home for Christmas" and "Cozy Little Christmas"
Adam Lambert	"Have Yourself a Merry Little Christmas"
Andrea Bocelli	"Silent Night" (no on-screen lyrics)

==== Appearances ====
- Kermit the Frog
- Miss Piggy
- Robin Roberts
