= Silkwood =

1983 film by Mike Nichols

- Theatrical release poster
- Directed by: Mike Nichols
- Written by: Nora Ephron; Alice Arlen
- Based on: Who Killed Karen Silkwood? by Howard Kohn
- Produced by: Michael Hausman; Mike Nichols
- Starring: Meryl Streep; Kurt Russell; Cher
- Cinematography: Miroslav Ondříček
- Edited by: Sam O'Steen
- Music by: Georges Delerue
- Production companies: ABC Motion Pictures
- Distributed by: 20th Century Fox
- Release date: December 14, 1983
- Running time: 131 minutes
- Country: United States
- Language: English
- Budget: $10 million
- Box office: $35.6 million

Silkwood is a 1983 American biographical drama film directed by Mike Nichols, and starring Meryl Streep, Kurt Russell, and Cher. The screenplay by Nora Ephron and Alice Arlen was adapted from the book Who Killed Karen Silkwood? by Rolling Stone writer and activist Howard Kohn, which detailed the life of Karen Silkwood, a nuclear whistle-blower and a labor union activist who investigated alleged wrongdoing at the Kerr-McGee plutonium plant where she worked. In real life, her death in a car crash gave rise to a 1979 lawsuit, Silkwood v. Kerr-McGee, led by attorney Gerry Spence. The jury rendered its verdict of $10 million in damages to be paid to the Silkwood estate (her children), the largest amount in damages ever awarded for that kind of case at the time. The Silkwood estate eventually settled for $1.3 million.

The development of Silkwood spanned nine years, with the project originating with Warner Bros., who intended to cast Jane Fonda as Silkwood. Warner Bros. ultimately abandoned the project after producer Buzz Hirsch was subpoenaed by an Oklahoma City judge to disclose all of the film's research materials, an effort that was overruled by a 10th Circuit Court of Appeals in Denver. The project was later acquired by ABC Motion Pictures, with Nichols directing and Streep cast in the title role. Silkwood was shot largely in New Mexico and Texas on a budget of $10 million. Factual accuracy was maintained throughout the script. One scene in particular involved Silkwood activating a radiation alarm at the plant; Silkwood herself had forty times the legal limit of radioactive contamination in her system.

Streep had just finished filming Sophie's Choice (1982) when production began. The film marked a departure for some of its stars: it is noted for being one of the first serious works of Cher, who had been previously known mostly for her singing, and for Russell, who was at the time widely known for his work in the action genre.

Silkwood was released by 20th Century Fox on December 14, 1983. The film received positive reviews and was a box office success, with particular attention focused on Nichols' direction and Streep's performance. At the 56th Academy Awards, Silkwood received five nominations in total, including Streep for Best Actress, Cher for Best Supporting Actress and Nichols for Best Director.

== Plot ==
In 1972, Karen Silkwood, a worker at the Kerr-McGee Cimarron Fuel Fabrication Site (near Crescent, Oklahoma), shares a ramshackle house with two co-workers, her boyfriend Drew Stephens and her lesbian friend Dolly Pelliker. She makes MOX fuel rods for nuclear reactors, where she deals with the threat of exposure to radiation. She has become a union activist, concerned that corporate practices may adversely affect the health of workers. She is also engaged in a conflict with her former common-law husband in an effort to have more time with their three children.

Because the plant has ostensibly fallen behind on a major contract – fabricating MOX fuel rods for a breeder reactor at the Hanford Site in Washington state – employees are required to work long hours and weekends of overtime. She believes that managers are falsifying safety reports and cutting corners wherever possible, risking the welfare of the personnel. Karen approaches the union with her concerns and becomes active in lobbying for safeguards. She travels to Washington, D.C. to testify before the Atomic Energy Commission.

When Silkwood and other workers become contaminated by radiation, plant officials try to blame her for the incident. When she sees weld sample radiographies of fuel rods being retouched to hide shoddy work, and that records of inadequate safety measures had been altered, she decides to investigate further herself. Complications arise in her personal life when Angela, a funeral parlour beautician, joins the household as Dolly's lover. Unable to deal with Silkwood's obsession with gathering evidence, and suspecting her of infidelities, Drew moves out.

On November 13, 1974, once she feels she has gathered sufficient documentation, Silkwood contacts a journalist from The New York Times and arranges a nighttime meeting. She first attends a union meeting, carrying documentation of her findings on her way to meet with the journalist. En route, she sees approaching headlights in her rear-view mirror, which draw so close that they distract and blind her, preventing her from seeing the road ahead, leading to her fatal one-car crash. No documents are found in the wreckage of her car.

== Cast ==
- Meryl Streep as Karen Silkwood
- Kurt Russell as Drew Stephens
- Cher as Dolly Pelliker
- Craig T. Nelson as Winston
- Fred Ward as Morgan
- Diana Scarwid as Angela
- Ron Silver as Paul Stone
- Josef Sommer as Max Richter
- Charles Hallahan as Earl Lapin
- Tess Harper as Linda Dawson
- Sudie Bond as Thelma Rice
- Henderson Forsythe as Quincy Bissell
- Richard Hamilton as Georgie
- Bruce McGill as Mace Hurley
- David Strathairn as Wesley
- M. Emmet Walsh as Walt Yarborough
- Bill Cobbs as Man in Lunchroom
- Anthony Heald as 2nd Doctor
- Ray Baker as Pete Dawson
- Will Patton as Joe
- E. Katherine Kerr as Gilda Schultz
- J. C. Quinn as Curtis Schultz
- Kent Broadhurst as Carl

== Production ==
=== Development ===
Development of a film adaptation of Karen Silkwood's life spanned approximately nine years before the film began production. Executive producers Buzz Hirsch and Larry Cano, while both graduate students at the University of California, Los Angeles, became fascinated by Silkwood's story and sought to bring it to the screen. Within a year of graduating, Hirsch and Cano began developing the project. Warner Bros. initially expressed interest in producing the film with Jane Fonda portraying Silkwood, but the project dissipated after the Silkwood estate filed a lawsuit against Kerr-McGee, Silkwood's former employer. Kerr-McGee subsequently subpoenaed Hirsch to appear at a deposition in Oklahoma City, requesting that he produce all of the audition tapes, script notes, and other research materials for the studio's planned film adaptation. Federal Judge Luther Eubanks ruled in Kerr-McGee's favor, requiring that Hirsch disclose all research materials acquired for the film. In June 1977, a 10th Circuit Court of Appeals in Denver, Colorado, agreed to hear Hirsch's appeal of Eubanks' ruling, with the Writers Guild of America West voting to lend legal assistance to Hirsch in the process, declaring they would file an amicus curiae, "arguing that Hirsch has a First Amendment right to shield his film materials from subpoena." In September that year, the 10th Circuit Court of Appeals reversed Eubanks' ruling, ordering additional proceedings in Oklahoma City.

In the fall of 1980, ABC Motion Pictures began revamping Hirsch's original project with Nora Ephron and Alice Arlen writing the screenplay. Producer Frank Yablans, though not credited on the film, was involved in the project's development and was approached by director Mike Nichols, who was hired to direct.

=== Casting ===
Meryl Streep was cast as Karen Silkwood in October 1981. Nichols cast Cher in the role of Silkwood's lesbian roommate, Dolly Pelliker, after seeing her in the Broadway production of Come Back to the 5 & Dime, Jimmy Dean, Jimmy Dean, feeling she possessed the necessary "vitality, humor and surprising depth."

=== Filming ===
The film was shot on location in Albuquerque and Los Alamos in New Mexico, and Dallas, Howe, Texas City, and Tom Bean in Texas from September 7 to November 26, 1982. Arthur Hirsch and Larry Cano were the producers of the film and received Executive Producer credits. They began working on the movie while graduate film students at UCLA. Their involvement in the making of Silkwood set a precedent in the U.S. Supreme Court regarding the protection under the First Amendment of confidential sources for film-makers, as is done for journalists.

== Release ==
On December 8, 1983, 20th Century Fox held a local community screening of the film in Oklahoma City, inviting five executives from Kerr-McGee to attend. Only one of the company's employees, communications manager Ann Adams, attended. Following the screening, Adams remarked that the film was a "highly fictionalized dramatization" that depicted the company in a "false and defamatory manner." The film premiered the following week in the United States, on December 14, 1983, in a limited theatrical release showing at 257 theaters.

=== Box office ===
Silkwood grossed $1,218,322 during its opening weekend, ranking #12 at the box office. The film opened widely on January 27, 1984, during which, in its seventh week of release, it had expanded to 816 screens and reached #1. It eventually earned a total of $35,615,609 in the U.S. and Canada.

=== Critical response ===
Silkwood received largely favorable reviews from critics. Vincent Canby of The New York Times called the film "a precisely visualized, highly emotional melodrama that's going to raise a lot of hackles" and "a very moving work". He added, "There are, however, problems, not unlike those faced by Costa-Gavras in his State of Siege and Missing, and they are major. Mr. Nichols and his writers ... have attempted to impose a shape on a real-life story that, even as they present it, has no easily verifiable shape. We are drawn into the story of Karen Silkwood by the absolute accuracy and unexpected sweetness of its Middle American details and then, near the end, abandoned by a film whose images say one thing and whose final credit card another. The muddle of fact, fiction and speculation almost, though not quite, denies the artistry of all that's gone before". He concluded, "I realize that films shouldn't be judged in bits and pieces, but it's difficult not to see Silkwood in that way. For most of its running time it is so convincing—and so sure of itself—that it seems a particular waste when it goes dangerously wrong. It's like watching a skydiver execute all sorts of graceful, breath-taking turns, as he appears to ignore gravity and fly on his own, only to have him smash to earth when the chute doesn't open".

Roger Ebert of the Chicago Sun-Times rated the film four stars and commented, "It's a little amazing that established movie stars like Streep, Russell and Cher could disappear so completely into the everyday lives of these characters".

David Sterritt of The Christian Science Monitor called the film "a fine example of Hollywood's love-hate attitude toward timely and controversial subject matter". He continued, "The movie sides with Silkwood as a character, playing up her spunk and courage while casting wry, sidelong glances at her failings. When it comes to the issues connected with her, though, the filmmakers slip and slide around, providing an escape hatch ... for every position and opinion they offer. This makes the movie less polemical than it might have been, and a lot more wishy-washy ... This is too bad, because on other levels Silkwood is a strong and imaginative film. Meryl Streep gives the year's most astounding performance by an actress, adding vigor and complexity to almost every scene with her endlessly inventive portrayal of the eccentric heroine. The supporting players skillfully follow her lead".

Critic Peter Travers gave the film an unfavorable review, deeming Streep as miscast and the film overall as "preachy," concluding: "The notion that Eastern Establishment types like Nichols-Ephron-Streep can tell us what it's like to be a worker in Oklahoma is nothing if not patronizing". Angela Bonavoglia of Cinéaste similarly noted that the film features some "painfully patronizing moments", but conceded that it no less "manages an effective portrayal of working class life, especially its monotony and vulnerability".

The film holds a 78% rating on Rotten Tomatoes based on 41 reviews. The consensus reads: "Silkwood seethes with real-life rage -- but backs it up with compelling characters and trenchant observations". It also holds a score of 65 out of 100 on Metacritic based on ten reviews.

== Accolades ==
Award	Category	Subject	Result	Ref.
Academy Awards	Best Director	Mike Nichols	Nominated	
Academy Awards	Best Actress	Meryl Streep	Nominated	
Academy Awards	Best Supporting Actress	Cher	Nominated	
Academy Awards	Best Original Screenplay	Nora Ephron and Alice Arlen	Nominated	
Academy Awards	Best Film Editing	Sam O'Steen	Nominated	
British Academy Film Awards	Best Actress in a Leading Role	Meryl Streep	Nominated	
British Academy Film Awards	Best Actress in a Supporting Role	Cher	Nominated	
Golden Globe Awards	Best Motion Picture – Drama		Nominated	
Golden Globe Awards	Best Actress in a Motion Picture – Drama	Meryl Streep	Nominated	
Golden Globe Awards	Best Supporting Actor – Motion Picture	Kurt Russell	Nominated	
Golden Globe Awards	Best Supporting Actress – Motion Picture	Cher	Won	
Golden Globe Awards	Best Director – Motion Picture	Mike Nichols	Nominated	
Kansas City Film Critics Circle Awards	Best Actress	Meryl Streep	Won	
Los Angeles Film Critics Association Awards	Best Supporting Actress	Cher	Runner-up	
Nastro d'Argento	Best Foreign Actress	Meryl Streep	Nominated	
National Society of Film Critics Awards	Best Supporting Actress	Cher	2nd Place	
New York Film Critics Circle Awards	Best Film		Nominated	
New York Film Critics Circle Awards	Best Actress	Meryl Streep	Nominated	
New York Film Critics Circle Awards	Best Supporting Actress	Cher	Runner-up	
Writers Guild of America Awards	Best Drama – Written Directly for the Screen	Nora Ephron and Alice Arlen	Nominated	

=== Home media ===
Anchor Bay Entertainment released the film on VHS and a region 1 DVD in 1998 and 1999, respectively. The Anchor Bay DVD contained a dual-sided disc featuring both anamorphic widescreen and fullscreen formats. A second region 1 DVD was released by MGM Home Entertainment on October 7, 2003.

The film was broadcast in high definition (1080i) on Sky+ HD. Silkwood was released on DVD and Blu-ray from Kino Lorber on July 25, 2017, under license from Walt Disney Studios, who acquired the ABC Film Studios catalogue in 1995. The sales for the Kino Lorber Blu-ray totaled $121,094.

== Legacy ==
Silkwood marked a career resurgence for director Nichols, who had not worked in film for nearly a decade prior to the film's release.

The American Film Institute included Karen Silkwood as the #47 hero in AFI's 100 Years...100 Heroes and Villains and the film as #66 in AFI's 100 Years...100 Cheers.

== See also ==
- The China Syndrome
- Erin Brockovich
- Norma Rae
- Nuclear power
- Nuclear fuel
- Nuclear fuel cycle
- Nuclear security
- Nuclear contamination

== Sources ==
- Borda, Jennifer L. (2015). Women Labor Activists in the Movies: Nine Depictions of Workplace Organizers, 1954-2005. Jefferson, North Carolina: McFarland. ISBN 978-1-476-60683-5.
- Reiboldt, Wendy; Mallers, Melanie Horn, eds. (2013). Consumer Survival: An Encyclopedia of Consumer Rights, Safety, and Protection. Santa Barbara, California: ABC-CLIO. ISBN 978-1-598-84937-0.
- Sonneborn, Liz (2014). A to Z of American Women in the Performing Arts. New York City, New York: Infobase Publishing. ISBN 978-1-438-10790-5.
- Whitehead, J. W. (2014). Mike Nichols and the Cinema of Transformation. Jefferson, North Carolina: McFarland. ISBN 978-0-786-47145-4.
- Windell, James O. (2015). Looking Back in Crime: What Happened on This Date in Criminal Justice History?. Boca Raton, Florida: CRC Press. ISBN 978-1-4987-0414-4.
