= Done and Dusted =

British television production and event staging company

- Company type: Private
- Industry: Video production Event staging
- Founded: 1998; 28 years ago in London, United Kingdom
- Founders: Hamish Hamilton; Ian Stewart; Simon Pizey
- Headquarters: London, United Kingdom; Santa Monica, California, U.S.
- Parent: Pantheon Media Group (2024–present)
- Website: doneanddusted.com

Done and Dusted (stylised as DONE+DUSTED) is a British television production and event staging company.

== Produced ==
Done and Dusted has staged and filmed events all over the world including the Academy Awards, Victoria's Secret Fashion Show, iHeartRadio Music Awards, Kids' Choice Awards, Kids' Choice Sports, Primetime Emmy Awards, CNN Heroes, Victoria's Secret Swim Special, Laureus World Sports Awards, T4 On The Beach, MOBOs, The Disney Family Singalong Series, Stand Up To Cancer, the BAFTA TV Awards and The Little Mermaid Live!.

The company was hired by Danny Boyle to work with the Olympic Broadcasting Services to film segments of the 2012 Summer Olympics opening ceremony.

== Awards ==
- 2011 - George Foster Peabody Award for "CNN Heroes: An All-Star Tribute"
- 2012 - Royal Television Society Craft & Design Awards - Multicamera Work for "Adele Live At The Royal Albert Hall"
- 2013 - New York Festival’s International Television & Film Award - Grand Award Two Gold Medals for Special Event "2012 Summer Olympics opening ceremony"
- 2014 - New York Festival’s International Television & Film Award - Gold Medal for Variety Special "Kelly Clarkson's Cautionary Christmas Music Tale"
- 2014 - New York Festival’s International Television & Film Award - Gold World Medal for Special Event "Victoria's Secret Fashion Show 2014"
- 2015 - New York Festival’s International Television & Film Award - Silver World Medal for Documentary "David Bowie Is"
- 2015 - New York Festival’s International Television & Film Award - Bronze World Medal for Children's/Youth Special "Nickelodeon's Kids Choice Sports Awards 2014"
- 2015 - New York Festival’s International Television & Film Award - Gold World Award for Special Event "iHeartRadio Music Awards 2015"
- 2015 - Televisual Bulldog Award - Nomination Of The Live Event Award "Victoria's Secret Fashion Show 2014"
- 2017 - Emmy Nomination for Outstanding Creative Achievement in Interactive Media within an Unscripted Program "Stand Up To Cancer"
