= Gerry Spence =

American lawyer and author (1929–2025)

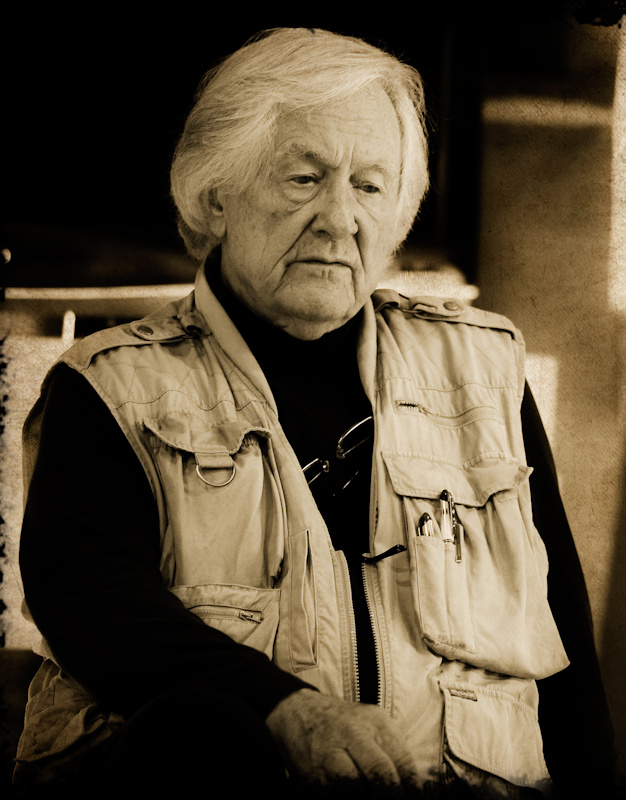
- Spence in 2008
- Born: Gerald Leonard Spence; January 8, 1929; Laramie, Wyoming, U.S.
- Died: August 13, 2025 (aged 96); Montecito, California, U.S.
- Education: University of Wyoming (BSL, LLB)
- Occupations: Lawyer; author

Gerald Leonard Spence (January 8, 1929 – August 13, 2025) was an American trial lawyer and author. He was a member of the Trial Lawyer Hall of Fame and was the founder of the Trial Lawyers College. Spence never lost a criminal trial before a jury, either as a prosecutor or a defense attorney, (Note: It is known that he lost a manslaughter bench trial in Oregon in 1985, but he won when the verdict was appealed.) and did not lose a civil trial after 1969, although several verdicts were overturned on appeal. He is considered one of the greatest lawyers of the 20th century, and among the best trial lawyers ever. He has been described by legal scholar Richard Falk as a "lawyer par excellence". The New York Times said that "in the tradition of Perry Mason, he seemed unbeatable."

Spence was recognized for winning nearly every case he ever handled, including a number of high-profile cases, such as Randy Weaver at Ruby Ridge, the Ed Cantrell murder case, the Karen Silkwood case, and the defense of Geoffrey Fieger. He also defended Brandon Mayfield, and successfully prosecuted Mark Hopkinson as a special prosecutor. One of his most significant cases was the defense of Imelda Marcos, former First Lady of the Philippines and first governor of Metro Manila, in a racketeering/fraud case considered one of the trials of the century, which he won.

Spence won multi-million-dollar lawsuits against corporations, such as $26.5 million in libel damages for 1978 Miss Wyoming Kim Pring against Penthouse in 1981. He also won a $52 million lawsuit against McDonald's in 1984. Spence won more multi-million dollar verdicts without an intervening loss than any lawyer in the United States. Spence acted as a legal consultant for NBC during its coverage of the O. J. Simpson trial and appeared on Larry King Live. He was the author of over a dozen books about politics and law, including The New York Times bestseller How to Argue and Win Every Time (1995), Win Your Case (2005), From Freedom to Slavery (1993), and Police State: How America's Cops Get Away with Murder (2015).

== Background ==
Gerry Spence was born in Laramie, Wyoming, on January 8, 1929. He graduated from the University of Wyoming in 1949 and from the University of Wyoming College of Law in 1952, graduating first in his class.

Spence was awarded an honorary Doctor of Laws degree in May 1990. He started his career in Riverton, Wyoming, and later became a successful defense attorney for the insurance industry, winning many cases. Years later, Spence said he "saw the light" and became committed to representing individuals instead of corporations, insurance companies, banks, or "big business."

From 1954 to 1962, he served as prosecuting attorney of Fremont County, Wyoming.

Spence and his second wife divided their time between their homes in Dubois, Wyoming, and Santa Barbara, California. Spence chose the name Imaging for his second wife, who was born LaNelle Hampton Peterson. Despite having residences in two different states, Spence stated that he would "die in Wyoming"; however, he died in California.

== High-profile cases ==
=== Karen Silkwood ===
Spence gained national attention during the Karen Silkwood case. Karen Silkwood was a worker at the Kerr-McGee plutonium-production plant, where she became a whistleblower and activist concerned with workplace safety. On November 13, 1974, she died in a suspicious one-car crash after allegedly gathering evidence for her union and the New York Times. Spence represented her family, who sued Kerr-McGee for exposing Silkwood to dangerous levels of radiation. Spence won a $10.5 million verdict for the family, but an appeals court reversed the verdict. After the ruling by the appeals court, the two sides later agreed to a settlement of $1.3 million.

In 1984, the Supreme Court of the United States upheld the family's right to seek punitive damages under state law, even against a federally regulated industry. The Silkwood case achieved international fame and was the subject of many books, magazine and newspaper articles, and the major motion picture Silkwood starring Meryl Streep as Karen Silkwood.

=== Other cases ===
After the Silkwood case, Spence tried a number of high-profile cases. He did not lose a civil case after 1969 and never lost a criminal case with a trial by jury. By 1980, he had dealt with around 50 murder cases, not losing a single one of them. Despite his tremendous success, he had several of his more prominent civil verdicts overturned on appeal and lost a 1985 manslaughter case in a bench trial in Newport, Oregon, in December 1985, later prevailing on appeal.

He was known for taking up cases deemed to be unwinnable, such as the murder case of Joe Esquibel, who murdered his wife in front of multiple witnesses, yet Spence managed to gain his acquittal through reason of insanity. He gained the acquittal of Sandy Jones for the murder of Wilfred Gerttula, and had the manslaughter conviction of her son, Michael Jones Jr., overturned on appeal.

Spence successfully defended Randy Weaver on murder, assault, conspiracy, and gun charges in the 1992 Ruby Ridge Standoff, by successfully impugning the conduct of the FBI and its crime lab. Spence never called a witness for the defense. He relied only on contradictions and holes in the prosecution's story. Spence later wrote that he rejected Weaver's extremist political opinions, but took the case because he believed Federal officials had entrapped Weaver and also behaved unconscionably in shooting Weaver's unarmed wife. In another case, he successfully gained the acquittal of a young janitor who had confessed to stabbing a woman to death.

He gained the acquittal of Ed Cantrell in a Rock Springs, Wyoming murder case that alleged that Cantrell murdered a police officer who was going to testify about allegations that the local authorities protected the activities of a large number of prostitutes and pimps in Rock Springs.

Spence won the acquittal of former Filipino First Lady Imelda Marcos in New York City on federal racketeering charges. He also defended Earth First! founder David Foreman, who in 1990 had been charged with conspiracy for an alleged plot to sabotage a water-pumping station.

On June 2, 2008, Spence obtained an acquittal of Detroit lawyer Geoffrey Fieger, who was charged with making unlawful campaign contributions. Before returning a not-guilty verdict, the federal court jury deliberated 18 hours over four days. The acquittal maintained Spence's record of never having lost a jury trial in a criminal matter.

In civil litigation, Spence won a $52 million verdict against McDonald's Corporation on behalf of a small, family-owned ice cream company. A medical malpractice verdict of over $4 million established a new standard for nursing care in Utah. In 1992 Spence earned $33.5 million verdicts for emotional and punitive damages for his quadriplegic client after a major insurance company refused to pay on the $50,000 policy.

=== Mock trial: United States v. Oswald ===
In 1986, Spence defended in absentia Lee Harvey Oswald, the deceased assassin of U.S. President John F. Kennedy, against well-known prosecutor Vincent Bugliosi in a 21-hour televised unscripted mock trial sponsored by London Weekend Television in the United Kingdom. The mock trial involved an actual U.S. judge, a jury of U.S. citizens, the introduction of hundreds of evidence exhibits, and many actual witnesses to events surrounding and including the assassination. The jury returned a guilty verdict. Expressing admiration for his adversary's prosecutorial skill, Spence remarked, "No other lawyer in America could have done what Vince did in this case." The "docu-trial" and his preparation for it inspired Bugliosi's 1600-page book examining the details of the Kennedy assassination and various related conspiracy theories, entitled Reclaiming History, winner of the 2008 Edgar Award for Best Fact Crime. Several times in the book Bugliosi specifically cites his respect for Spence's abilities as a defense attorney as his impetus for digging more deeply into various aspects of the case than he perhaps would have otherwise.

== Tort reform activism ==
During the election season of 2004, Spence, a vocal opponent of tort reform, crisscrossed his native Wyoming spearheading a series of self-funded town hall-style meetings to inform voters of an upcoming ballot measure, Constitutional Amendment D, which would have limited Wyoming citizens' ability to recover compensation if injured by medical malpractice. The ballot measure failed, with a 50.3% "No" vote.

== Public interest and television work ==
For many years, Spence taught, lectured at law schools and conducted seminars at various legal organizations around the country. He founded and served as director of the non-profit Trial Lawyers College (now known as the "Gerry Spence Method"), where, per its mission statement, lawyers and judges "committed to the jury system" are trained to help achieve justice for individuals fighting "corporate and government oppression", particularly those individuals who could be described as "the poor, the injured, the forgotten, the voiceless, the defenseless and the damned". Teachers at the school have been Richard "Racehorse" Haynes, Morris Dees from the Southern Poverty Law Center and John Gotti defense lawyer Albert Krieger.

Spence was also the founder of Lawyers and Advocates for Wyoming, a pro bono law firm that represents the poor. He served as legal consultant for NBC television covering the O. J. Simpson trial and appeared on The Oprah Winfrey Show, Larry King Live, and Geraldo. He had his own talk show on CNBC from 1995 to 1996. He received the Golden Plate Award of the American Academy of Achievement in 1996.

== Later life and death ==
After winning the Fieger acquittal in 2008, Spence told jurors, "This is my last case. I will be 80 in January, and it's time for me to quit, to put down the sword." In 2010, however, Spence was still listed as an active partner in the Spence Law Firm, located in Jackson, Wyoming, and continued to make public appearances. Despite his claim of retirement, Spence took on a civil suit for wrongful incarceration, which ended with a mistrial in December 2012 when the jury could not come to a unanimous decision. According to the cite to the AP story: "The verdicts Pratt read in court indicated jurors had found in favor of Larsen, Brown and the city of Council Bluffs on both major issues. The first issue was whether Harrington and McGhee's constitutional rights to due process had been violated. The second was whether the city had failed to adequately train and supervise the police officers. When the judge polled the jurors to ensure all agreed, three women said no." In October 2013, the AP reported that the suit was settled between the two parties four days before a retrial was scheduled to start.

Spence was selected as a top lawyer by Super Lawyers between 2008 and 2022. He received the first Lifetime Achievement Award from Consumer Attorneys of California in 2008. He also received the American Association for Justice's Lifetime Achievement Award in 2013.

Spence later oversaw The Gerry Spence Method program, which trains trial lawyers who represent injured people and people accused of crimes; no corporate or government lawyers are allowed to attend. Gerry Spence was one of the longest-serving lawyers, having worked for over 70 years.

Spence died at his home in Montecito, California, on August 13, 2025, at the age of 96.

== Legacy ==
After his passing, Spence was called "the greatest trial lawyer of all time, plain and simple," in the magazine of America's trial lawyers, The Trial Lawyer.

== Partial bibliography ==
Spence was the author of more than a dozen books, including:

- Gunning for Justice – My Life and Trials (Doubleday 1982) ISBN 978-0-385-17703-0
- Of Murder and Madness: A True Story of Insanity and the Law (Doubleday 1983) ISBN 978-0-385-18801-2
- Trial by Fire: The True Story of a Woman's Ordeal at the Hands of the Law (William Morrow 1986) ISBN 978-0-688-06075-6
- With Justice for None: Destroying an American Myth (Times Books 1989) ISBN 978-0-14-013325-7
- From Freedom to Slavery: The Rebirth of Tyranny in America (St. Martin's Press 1993) ISBN 978-0-312-14342-8
- How to Argue & Win Every Time: At Home, At Work, In Court, Everywhere, Everyday (St. Martin's Press 1995) ISBN 0-312-14477-6
- The Making of a Country Lawyer (St. Martin's Press 1996) ISBN 978-0-312-14673-3
- O. J.: The Last Word (St. Martin's Press 1997) ISBN 978-0-312-18009-6
- Give Me Liberty: Freeing Ourselves in the Twenty-First Century (St. Martin's Press 1998) ISBN 0-312-24563-7
- A Boy's Summer: Fathers and Sons Together (St. Martin's Press June 1, 2000) ISBN 978-0-312-20282-8
- Gerry Spence's Wyoming: The Landscape (St. Martin's Press October 19, 2000) ISBN 978-0-312-20776-2
- Half Moon and Empty Stars (Scribner, 2001) ISBN 0-7432-0276-7
- Seven Simple Steps to Personal Freedom: An Owner's Manual for Life (St. Martin's Griffin November 1, 2002) ISBN 978-0-312-30311-2
- The Smoking Gun: Day by Day Through a Shocking Murder Trial (Scribner 2003) ISBN 978-0-7432-4696-5
- Win Your Case: How to Present, Persuade, and Prevail—Every Place, Every Time (St. Martin's Press 2006) ISBN 0-312-36067-3
- Bloodthirsty Bitches and Pious Pimps of Power: The Rise and Risks of the New Conservative Hate Culture (St. Martin's Press 2006) ISBN 978-0-312-36153-2
- The Lost Frontier: Images and Narrative (Gibbs Smith October 1, 2013) ISBN 978-1-4236-3290-0
- Police State: How America's Cops Get Away with Murder (St. Martin's Press May 16, 2018) ISBN 978-1-250-07345-7
- So I Said: Quotes and Thoughts of Gerry Spence (Sastrugi Press September 8, 2018) ISBN 978-1-944986-38-4
- Court of Lies (Forge Books February 19, 2019) ISBN 978-1-250-18348-4
- The Martyrdom of Collins Catch the Bear (Seven Stories Press October 6, 2020) ISBN 978-1-60980-966-9
