= Trial of Imelda Marcos =

1990 legal affair

United States v. Marcos
- Court: United States District Court for the Southern District of New York
- Full case name: United States of America v. Imelda Romuáldez Marcos, Adnan Khashoggi
- Decided: July 2, 1990
- Verdict: Acquitted on all charges
- Defendant: Imelda Romuáldez Marcos

Court membership
- Judge sitting: John F. Keenan

United States v. Marcos (officially the United States of America v. Imelda Romuáldez Marcos, Adnan Khashoggi) was a 1990 federal trial involving the former First Lady of the Philippines and the first governor of Metro Manila, Imelda Marcos, who was indicted on charges of fraud, racketeering, conspiracy, and obstruction of justice. Co-defendant was Saudi arms dealer and businessman Adnan Khashoggi, who was indicted on charges of fraud and obstruction of justice.

On July 2, 1990, the jury acquitted both on all charges, after a three-month trial and five days of jury deliberations. Marcos was notably represented by Gerry Spence.

The trial of Imelda Marcos is considered one of the trials of the century of the 20th century.

== Background ==
Imelda Marcos was First Lady of the Philippines from 1965 to 1986, and the first governor of Metro Manila from 1975 to 1986, and in that time, Imelda Marcos wielded significant power as the wife of Ferdinand Marcos, who served as the tenth President of the Philippines from 1965 to 1986.

Imelda Marcos was ultimately charged with four counts, those being racketeering, conspiracy to commit racketeering, mail fraud and obstruction of justice. Adnan Khashoggi was charged with one count of mail fraud and one count of obstruction of justice, and was seen as having helped the couple conceal their assets.

Tobacco heiress Doris Duke posted Marcos's bail of $5 million. Marcos faced up to 50 years in prison and fines up to $1 million if convicted of all charges. Following the illness and eventual death of her husband, Imelda Marcos became the main defendant.

The United States and Philippine governments worked closely to prosecute the case. Debra A. Livingston and Charles G. LaBella, the chief of the Public Corruption Unit of the S.D.N.Y, were the prosecutors in the case.

== Trial ==
95 witnesses were brought forth by prosecution against Marcos, while Gerry Spence brought forth none in defense of Marcos, instead portraying her as a victim who did not know of her husband's crimes. Prosecution also had some 360,000 documents.

In the closing arguments, prosecutor Charles G. LaBella described Marcos as "the one pulling the strings".

Despite overwhelming evidence and a thoroughly presented case by the prosecution against her, Marcos was acquitted on all charges after five days of jury deliberations. Adnan Khashoggi, a co-defendant, was also acquitted.

Judge John F. Kennan described the trial as "an unprecedented prosecution", due to the fact that it included world figures.
