= Trial of Ed Cantrell =

Wyoming v. Cantrell
- Court: Sweetwater County District Court
- Full case name: State of Wyoming v. Edward Lee Cantrell
- Decided: November 30, 1979
- Verdict: Not guilty
- Charge: First-degree murder

Court membership
- Judge sitting: Kenneth Hamm

State of Wyoming v. Ed Cantrell (officially the State of Wyoming v. Edward Lee Cantrell) was a state trial of Wyoming police officer Ed Cantrell for the killing of Michael Angel Rosa, an undercover narcotics agent in Rock Springs, Wyoming. Rosa had previously been working towards uncovering the immense corruption in the city.

After only three hours of deliberations, the jury accepted Cantrell's self-defense argument, and acquitted him of first-degree murder.

Famed lawyer Gerry Spence won the acquittal of Cantrell in what was deemed an "impossible case".

== Background ==
Outside a saloon in Rock Springs, in an unmarked police vehicle, Ed Cantrell shot Michael A. Rosa out of the belief that he was unstable and going for his gun to shoot, with two other officers present in the car during the shooting, those being officers Matt Bider and James Callas.

Michael A. Rosa had been working towards uncovering the largest amount of corruption in the city, with Rosa being set to testify to a grand jury about the corruption.

Cantrell's friends posted his bail of $250,000.

Justice of the Peace Nena Stafford ruled on February 7 of 1979 that Cantrell would have to stand trial on the charge of first-degree murder, after 15 days of preliminary hearings.

== Trial ==
Despite the murder occurring in Rock Springs, the defense requested a change of venue, which was accepted and granted to Pinedale, Wyoming, with judge Kenneth Hamm kept as the presiding judge. The prosecutors were from Sweetwater County, those being Robert Pickett and Jack Smith.

Cantrell shot Rosa between the eyes with his .38 caliber pistol, claiming that Rosa was about to draw on him, other witnesses testified that Rosa had a wine bottle between his legs.

After only three hours of jury deliberations, Ed Cantrell was found not guilty, with the jury accepting his argument of self-defense against Michael Rosa.

== Legacy ==
The killing of Michael Rosa and the following trial of Ed Cantrell has left a legacy in Rock Springs. It was listed in the book Great American Trials by journalist Edward W. Knappman. The Last Western: The Unjustified Killing of Michael Rosa by Ed Cantrell by Rone Tempest covers the infamous case.

Michael Rosa's spouse, Rebecca Rosa, filed a wrongful death lawsuit, seeking $1 million in damages as a result of her husband's killing, but ended up being dismissed by the court.
