= Ed Cantrell =

American state police officer (1927–2004)

Edward Cantrell
- Born: December 21, 1927; Bloomington, Indiana
- Died: June 11, 2004 (aged 76); Salt Lake City, Utah
- Relatives: Norma Cantrell (wife); 4 children
- Police career
- Department: Wyoming Highway Patrol; Rock Springs Police Department

Ed Cantrell (December 21, 1927 – June 11, 2004) was the public safety director of Rock Springs, Wyoming, a town tied to widespread corruption, who killed one of his own officers in 1978 but was acquitted at trial.

== Early biography ==
The son of Samuel Glenn Cantrell, a Nazarene minister and Vesta Marie (née Robison) Cantrell, Ed was born in Bloomington, Indiana. He excelled in sports and graduated from Plainfield High School in 1945 with a football and basketball scholarship. Aspiring to be a coach, he had almost completed three years at Indiana State College when President Truman ordered the Berlin airlift in 1948. Cantrell immediately enlisted in the Army and spent three years as a military policeman in the "bombed-out ruin" south of Frankfurt, Germany. His tour of duty was then extended due to the Korean War. Upon discharge, he graduated with honors from the Indiana State Police Academy.

An avid hunter, fisherman and marksman, he later visited Wyoming and decided to relocate there. Accepted into the Wyoming Highway Patrol, he was assigned to the Rock Springs area in 1960. Although he liked his job, he later resigned from the highway patrol to lobby for a state police bill. "A little skeleton crew of highway patrolmen and a sheriff's department was understaffed," he said, explaining that he and his fellow officers were trying to create a more effective state police force.

The following January he was hired as a range detective in Lusk. His job took him all over Wyoming as well as neighboring states in pursuit of lawbreakers. Then, in 1976, following the death of his elder son, Samuel, in a car accident, Cantrell and his wife, Nancy, decided to return to Rock Springs, where he worked for undersheriff Jim Stark. The following year Cantrell assumed the post of safety director of a badly demoralized Rock Springs police force. He then formed a detective division from existing officers and hired Michael Rosa as an undercover detective.

== The killing of Michael Rosa ==
The events leading to Cantrell shooting fellow officer Michael Rosa are disputed, although Cantrell was later acquitted of all charges through the efforts of his attorney, Gerry Spence. In one version of the events, Rosa, an undercover narcotics detective in Rock Springs was scheduled to testify about local corruption he had witnessed. This investigation was initiated by the former public safety director, Clyde Kemp, and by a 1977 60 Minutes exposé detailing Rock Springs City Hall-police corruption in drugs, prostitution and mob-activity, driven by an energy boom cycle of the town.

Several evenings before Rosa's scheduled grand jury testimony, Cantrell is said by an investigative piece in People to have called Officer Rosa to his car and, after he entered, shot him at point-blank range in the forehead while Rosa's gun was still holstered. The death of Rosa, who had widely complained about Rock Springs corruption, stalled the investigation and prevented him from implicating Cantrell or other Rock Springs officials. Two days after Rosa was killed, his wife's home was broken into and all of Rosa's confidential case files on corruption were stolen.

An alternative Cantrell-Spence friendly version is presented in an A&E City Confidential documentary, "Deadly Shootout in the Wild West" (starting at 15:00). In this version, a drug-addicted and unstable Rosa provoked the shooting. Cantrell had admonished Rosa for appearing on the witness stand in an unkempt manner. Cantrell said that Rosa later threatened him at the Sweetwater County Courthouse. Cantrell asked Rosa to meet him at the Silver Dollar on the afternoon of July 14, 1978, and, at one point, Rosa angrily said, "Where's your gun, old man?" Rosa had incurred a forty-dollar discrepancy on a drug-buying transaction and was also involved with a Rock Springs radio dispatcher, two situations that could have led to the married officer's dismissal from the force.

That evening Cantrell was called at his home by Sergeant Callas, who wanted to discuss Rosa's $40 discrepancy with his boss at the station. The two men later drove to the Silver Dollar Bar with police officer Matt Bider to talk to Rosa, although this would seem to be a very unusual time and place to talk to an undercover detective about a petty cash dispute. Rosa came out of the bar to see the three men, apparently very angry. He got into the car and sat in the back next to Bider and behind Callas, who was sitting in the driver's seat. Cantrell was sitting in the front passenger's seat.

Callas asked for Rosa's social security number. As he was writing it down, Cantrell claimed that he looked round and saw Rosa go for a gun. At that point he shot him. Cantrell then called in the FBI, the state criminal investigation department, and the highway patrol to investigate, and booked himself into jail, expecting a routine hearing. Instead, he was sent to the Evanston State Mental Hospital, where he was confined to a small cell for ten days. He was then released on a $250,000 bond and told to get out of town, but not the state.

Cantrell engaged Gerry Spence to defend him. At first Spence refused to take the case, but changed his mind after hearing Cantrell's version of what happened. Acquitted by a jury after less than two hours of deliberation, Cantrell found that the general public had not accepted the verdict. His safety director's job had been abolished, and he eventually found work as a range detective in South Dakota.

Cantrell died June 11, 2004, at the L.D.S. Hospital in Salt Lake City, Utah, following a brief illness.
