= Imelda Marcos =

First Lady of the Philippines from 1965 to 1986

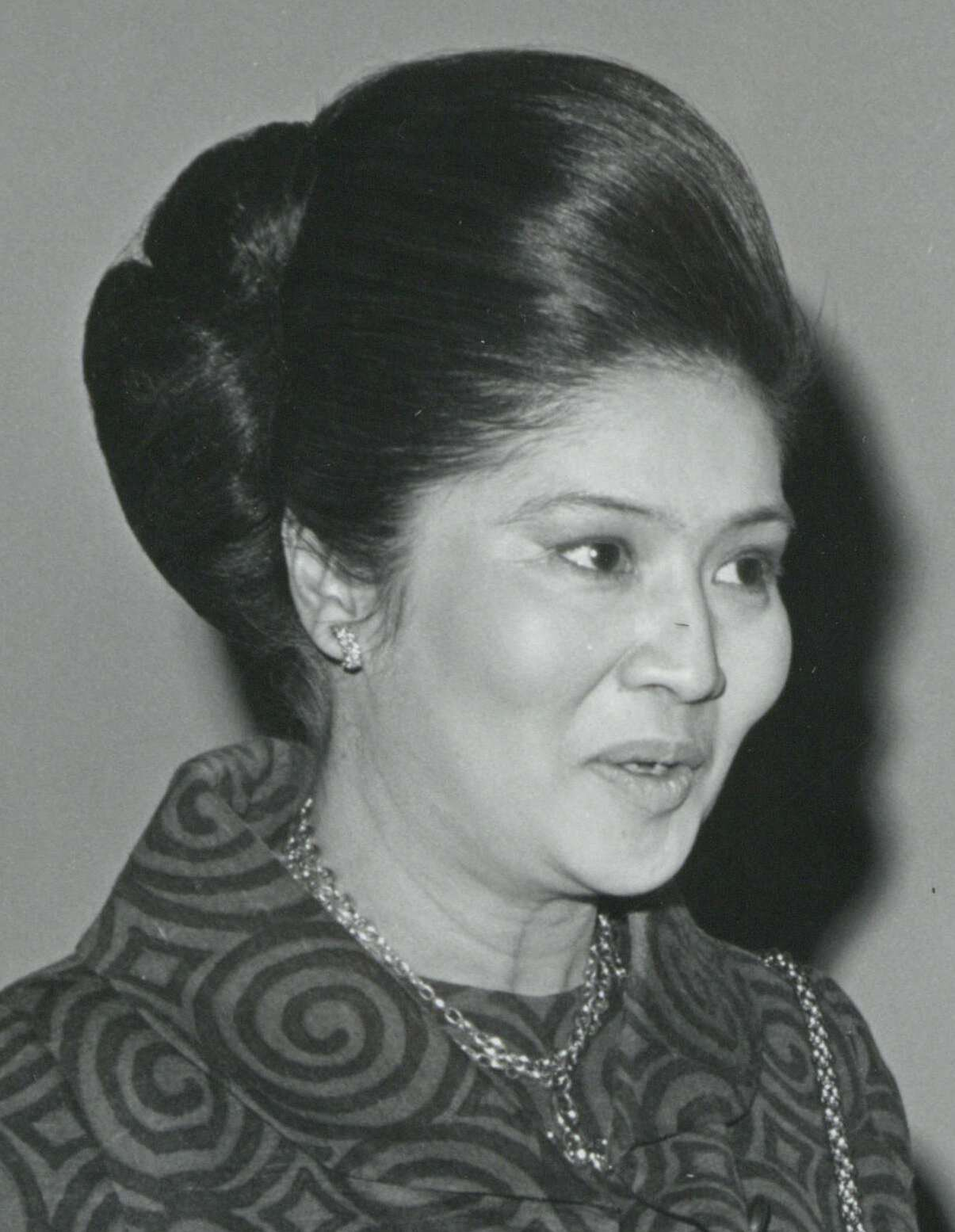
- Marcos in c. 1973

Member of the House of Representatives
- In office June 30, 2010 – June 30, 2019
- Preceded by: Bongbong Marcos
- Succeeded by: Eugenio Angelo Barba
- Constituency: Ilocos Norte’s 2nd district
- In office June 30, 1995 – June 30, 1998
- Preceded by: Cirilo Roy Montejo
- Succeeded by: Alfred Romualdez
- Constituency: Leyte’s 1st district

Member of the Interim Batasang Pambansa
- In office June 12, 1978 – June 5, 1984
- Constituency: Region IV

1st Governor of Metro Manila
- In office February 27, 1975 – February 25, 1986
- Appointed by: Ferdinand Marcos
- Vice Governor: Mel Mathay (1979–1986)
- Preceded by: Office established
- Succeeded by: Joey Lina (OIC)

Minister of Human Settlements
- In office June 12, 1978 – February 25, 1986
- President: Ferdinand Marcos
- Preceded by: Office established
- Succeeded by: Office abolished

First Lady of the Philippines
- In role December 30, 1965 – February 25, 1986
- President: Ferdinand Marcos
- Preceded by: Eva Macapagal
- Succeeded by: Amelita Ramos (1992) (Note: Corazon Aquino did not have a first spouse during her tenure as president, as her husband Ninoy Aquino died in 1983.)

Personal details
- Born: Imelda Remedios Visitación Trinidad Romuáldez; July 2, 1929 (age 97) San Miguel, Manila, Philippine Islands
- Party: Nacionalista (1965–1978; 2009–present)
- Other political affiliations: KBL (1978–2015)
- Spouse: Ferdinand Marcos (m. 1954; died 1989)
- Children: Imee Marcos; Bongbong Marcos; Irene Marcos; Aimee Marcos (adopted)
- Relatives: Romualdez family Marcos family
- Criminal information
- Status: Released on bail pending appeal
- Convictions: 7 counts of Graft under the Section 3(h) of the Anti-Graft and Corrupt Practices Act
- Penalty: 6 years and 1 month–11 years of imprisonment Suspension from holding public office
- Education: St. Paul's College (BS)

Imelda Romuáldez de Marcos (locally [ɪˈmelda ɾoˈmwɐldɛs ˈmaɾkɔs]; born Imelda Remedios Visitación Romuáldez y Trinidad; July 2, 1929) is a Filipino politician who was First Lady of the Philippines from 1965 to 1986, wielding significant political power after her husband Ferdinand Marcos placed the country under martial law in September 1972. She is the mother of current president Bongbong Marcos.

During her husband's 21-year rule, Imelda Marcos ordered the construction of many grandiose architectural projects, using public funds and "in impossibly short order" – a propaganda practice, which eventually came to be known as her "edifice complex". She and her husband stole billions of pesos from the Filipino people, amassing a personal fortune estimated to have been worth US$5 billion to US$10 billion by the time they were deposed in 1986; by 2018, about $3.6 billion of this had been recovered by the Philippine government, either through compromise deals or sequestration cases.

Marcos and her family gained notoriety for living a lavish lifestyle during a period of economic crisis and civil unrest in the country. She spent much of her time abroad on state visits, hosting extravagant parties, and indulging in expensive shopping sprees, spending much of the State's money on her personal art, jewelry and shoe collections – amassing 3,000 pairs of shoes. The subject of dozens of court cases around the world, she was eventually convicted of corruption charges in 2018 for her activities during her term as governor of Metro Manila; the case is under appeal. She and her husband hold the Guinness World Record for the "Greatest Robbery of a Government", putting Suharto of neighboring Indonesia at second.

The People Power Revolution in February 1986 unseated the Marcoses and forced the family into exile in Hawaii. In 1991, President Corazon Aquino allowed the Marcos family to return to the Philippines to face various charges after the 1989 death of Ferdinand. Imelda Marcos was elected four times to the House of Representatives of the Philippines, and ran twice for the presidency of the Philippines but failed to garner enough votes.

== Early life ==
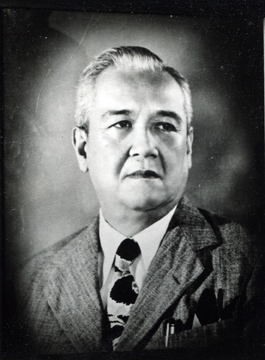
Imelda's father, Vicente Orestes Romuáldez

Imelda Remedios Visitación Romuáldez was born at dawn in San Miguel, Manila, on July 2, 1929. Her parents were Vicente Orestes Romuáldez, a lawyer, and his second wife, María Remedios Trinidad who was born and raised in Baliwag, Bulacan. Imelda is the sixth of Vicente's eleven children, and Remedios' firstborn. Her paternal great-grandfather was Fray Francisco Miguel López Silgado, a Spanish friar and silversmith from Granada, Andalusia, who became the parish priest of Pandacan in Manila.

Born into the Romualdez political dynasty from the province of Leyte, Imelda grew up in a wealthy clan of devout Catholics. She was baptized in the nearby San Miguel Church on the day after her birth.

Notable members of Imelda's family include the clan matriarch Doña Trinidad López de Romuáldez; her uncle Norberto Romualdez, who was a Supreme Court Associate Justice; and her younger brother Benjamin "Kokoy" Romualdez, who served as Governor of Leyte and later as an ambassador under the regime of Imelda's husband, Ferdinand Marcos.

At the time of her birth, the Romuáldez clan were wealthy, until around 1932 when the fortune of Imelda's family began to decline.

Imelda's parents separated for a time, during which Remedios worked for the nuns at the Asilo de San Vicente de Paul. Vicente and Remedios eventually reconciled but to avoid further conflict, she and her children, including Imelda, moved to their house's garage. In 1937, after Conchita's birth, Remedios' health began to fail and she died on April 7, 1938, due to double pneumonia. In her ten years of marriage, Remedios had six children: Imelda, Benjamín, Alita, Alfredo, Armando, and Conchita.

In November 1938, Imelda's father gave up living in Manila due to his declining fortunes in his law practice and returned to Tacloban, where he could support his family with a simpler lifestyle. She grew up speaking the Waray language, and then learned the Tagalog language and eventually English.

== Education ==
=== Elementary ===
Imelda finished grade one at the nearby College of the Holy Spirit Manila, where her older half-sisters also studied.

Imelda continued her early studies at Holy Infant Academy, a convent school run by the Order of Saint Benedict. The old wooden structure of the school still stands today four blocks away from the Romualdez house. At school, Imelda had to face her family's humiliating poverty, and she was frequently among the students who had to apologize for late payments.

=== High school ===
In 1942, the Romualdezes returned to Tacloban, and around that time, Imelda's father refused to let her go back to school. When the Americans returned in 1944, she was eager to resume her studies at Leyte Progressive High School. She finished her first year at the provincial high school where she was also chosen Miss I-A; then in her second year, she moved to Holy Infant and stayed there until she graduated.

Imelda continued her higher studies at Holy Infant Academy from 1938 to 1948, the year she graduated from high school. As a student, her scholastic record shows that she had a general average of 80 percent throughout her primary and high school.

=== College ===
Imelda ran for President of the student council at St. Paul's College (now named Divine Word University) in 1951, three years before her marriage to Marcos. At that time, she was about to graduate with a degree in Education. She was put up as a candidate for the Department of Education, which had an enrollment of 800 students. Even during the nomination, her victory was already a foregone conclusion, but the school authorities insisted that another candidate be put up to make the elections a democratic procedure. That was how the College of Law, with 200 students, put up Francisco Pedrosa.

While an undergraduate student, Marcos taught at a local Chinese high school before graduating in 1952. She had won a scholarship to study music at the Philippine Women's University under Adoración Reyes, a close friend of the family. She briefly held a job at a music store but left this for a better one at the Central Bank. After a few lessons, Adoración was convinced that Imelda had talent and persuaded her to enroll at the College of Music and Fine Arts at Philippine Women's University (PWU), under a special arrangement that put her on register while Adoración continued to give her free lessons.

== Early career ==
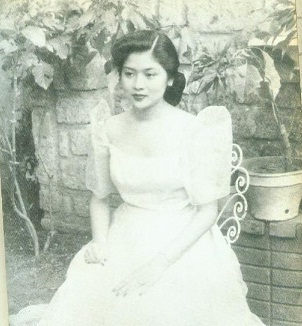
Imelda Marcos in 1953

Imelda returned to Manila in 1952 under the rule of President Elpidio Quirino and stayed in the house of her relative, House of Representatives of the Philippines Speaker Pro tempore Daniel Romuáldez, who had three adopted children. Imelda's status in the Romuáldez household during this time has been described as "higher than servants and lower than family members as a poor relative". Imelda found work as a salesgirl in a store called P.E. Domingo, which infuriated her father when he learned of it during one of his visits, perceiving it as ill treatment of Imelda.

To calm the indignation of Vicente Romuáldez, Eduardo and Daniel exercised their political and economic influence to find work for Imelda at the Central Bank where she worked under Braulio Hipuna, the Chief Clerk of the Intelligence Division.

During this time her cousin Loreto Ramos introduced her to Adoración Reyes, a teacher from the College of Music and Fine Arts of Philippine Women's University (PWU), who gave her vocal lessons and a chance to get a PWU scholarship. She later sang three songs at a performance with her cousin Loreto at Holy Ghost College (now named College of the Holy Spirit Manila).

Imelda also joined the 1953 Miss Manila beauty pageant. The results became controversial, resulting in both Imelda and Miss Norma Jiménez being declared Manila's candidate to the larger Miss Philippines pageant. Both of them eventually lost to Miss Cristina Galang.

== Courtship and marriage ==
Imelda and Ferdinand Marcos met on April 6, 1954, during a budget hearing at the Philippine Congress. Ferdinand was part of the opposition team who led the argument against the budget, while Imelda was there to visit her cousin Daniel, who was the Speaker of the House. During a recess, Imelda caught Ferdinand's eye, and he asked his journalist friend Jose Guevara of The Manila Times to introduce him to Imelda. At that time, Ferdinand already knew of Imelda. Imelda, on the other hand, knew very little of Ferdinand Marcos. After comparing heights and confirming that he was at least an inch taller than her, Ferdinand sought the help of Guevara to pursue Imelda in marriage. This whirlwind courtship lasted only eleven days.

During Holy Week of that year, Ferdinand visited Imelda's house, and when Imelda claimed that she planned to spend the holidays in Baguio, Ferdinand and Guevara offered her a ride up to Daniel's family mansion where she planned to stay, while the two booked a room in nearby Pines. For the remainder of that Holy Week, Ferdinand showered Imelda with flowers and gifts and visited her daily, prodding her to sign the marriage license that sealed the agreement. On April 16, 1954, Good Friday, after having been jokingly asked by Guevara if she wanted to be "the First Lady of the Land someday", Imelda finally agreed to sign it. On April 17, 1954, Ferdinand and Imelda were secretly married by a reluctant Francisco Chanco, a judge befriended by Ferdinand who lived in the area. The church wedding followed only after receiving the blessing of Vicente Orestes, Imelda's father, which Ferdinand asked via telegram on Easter Sunday. Their wedding was held on May 1, 1954, at the San Miguel Pro-Cathedral in Manila where Imelda was christened.

The marriage meant that Ferdinand's common-law wife, Carmen Ortega of La Union's Ortega political clan, with whom he had already sired three children, had to be quietly removed from the public eye.

== 1965 presidential campaign ==
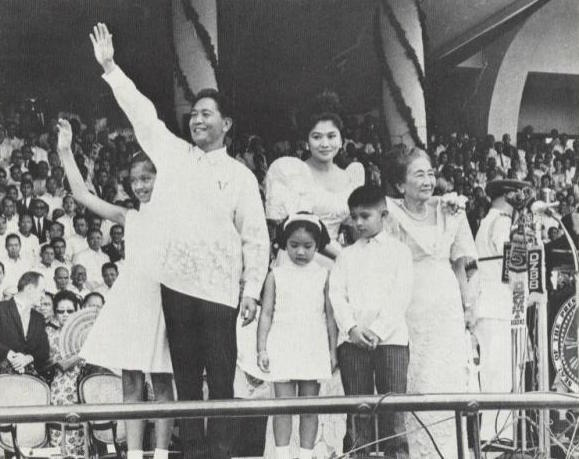
Imelda Marcos with President Ferdinand Marcos and family during the 1965 inauguration

It was during the 1965 campaign that Imelda became influential as a political figure at the national level, supporting her husband’s political tactics through her charismatic appeal and youth. Crowds of working-class Filipinos came out in droves to Marcos campaigns because they wanted to see the "beautiful wife of Marcos".

Campaign strategists incorporated Imelda’s public appeal into the overall tone of the Marcos-led Nacionalista campaign, asking Imelda to always appear at her best in public at all times regardless of the type of audience and encouraging her to wear her signature ternos as an integral part of their image strategy.

Marcos heavily relied on Imelda, eventually telling the press at one point that it was Imelda who had delivered the one million vote margin he needed to win the election.

It was in this period that Imelda described herself – a neophyte transitioning into a true political partner to her husband – as "a butterfly breaking out of its cocoon". This led one foreign journalist to call her "the iron butterfly".

Imelda had assumed a managerial position in her husband's campaign early on when Marcos faced his first challenge, which was to win the presidential candidacy for the Nacionalista Party. She enthusiastically ran a detailed campaign, befriending the 1,347 delegates of the Nacionalista Party Convention until Ferdinand Marcos won the party’s presidential nomination on November 21, 1964, for the Nacionalista Party.

McCoy recounts that it was supposedly also Imelda who convinced Fernando Lopez to accept the vice-presidential nomination alongside Marcos. She met Lopez personally, appealing to him by recounting the many struggles she and Ferdinand faced during the campaign. Lopez refused to give in multiple times, until Imelda cried in front of him. When he relented, Imelda proceeded to hand a document to sign, stating that he had accepted the nomination as the Nacionalista vice-presidential candidate.

During the presidential election itself, she delivered votes from the southern province of Leyte and Manila. She was especially popular with the poor. Imelda also used her voice to appeal to voters, singing during campaigns. Her songs were usually varieties of local folk songs.

== First term (1965–1969) ==
During Ferdinand Marcos's first term, Imelda began doing the duties traditionally expected of a First Lady, mostly social events and public appearances. Imelda became a power broker. Receptions at her offices in the Malacañang "Music Room" were sought after by cabinet members, heads of financing institutions, and business leaders who felt that she had Ferdinand's ear.

A year later in March 1966, Marcos established the Cultural Center of the Philippines through Executive Order No. 60 and arranged for Imelda to be elected chairman of the board in a bid to change the perception that she was just another "politician's wife".

=== Inauguration ===
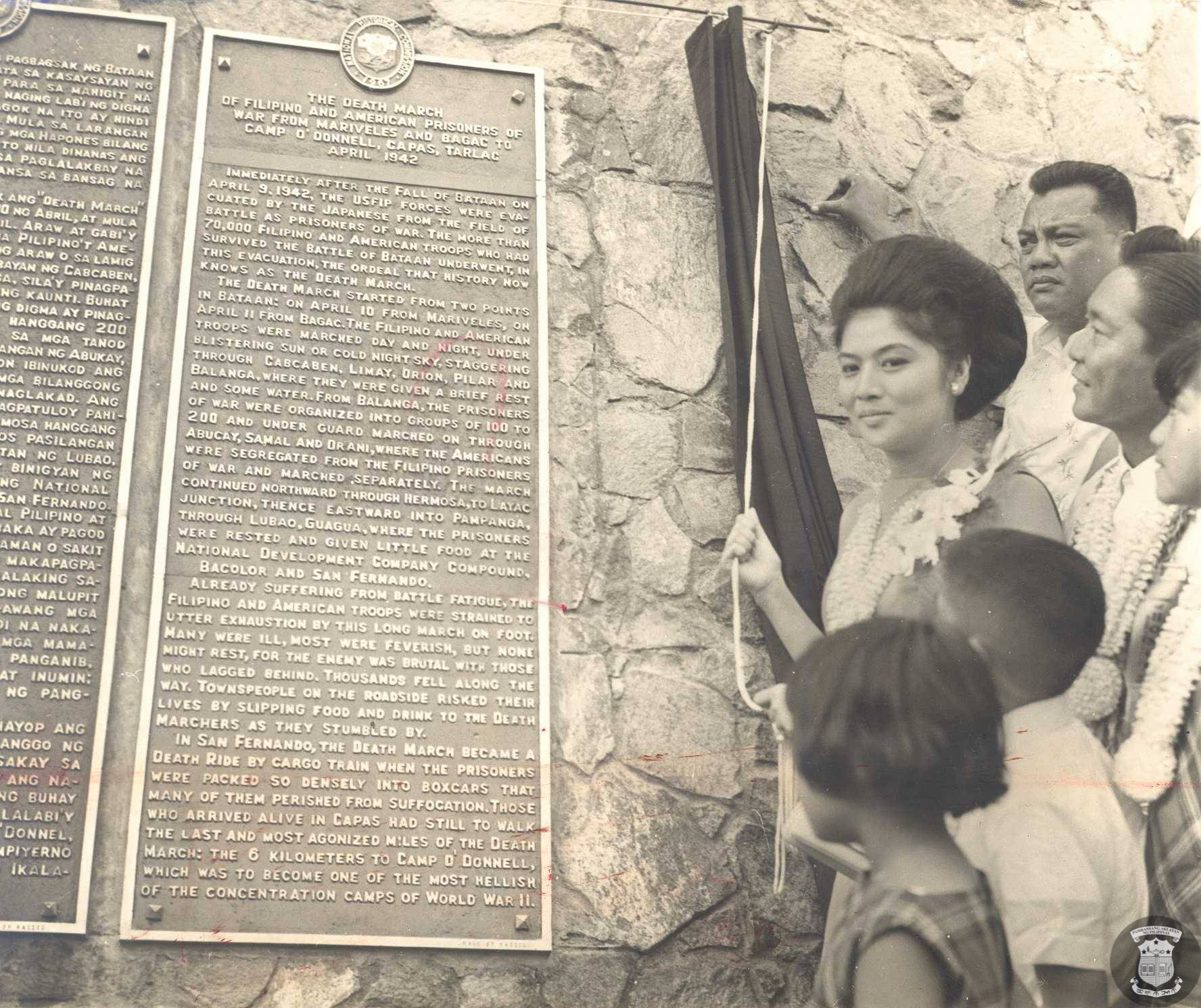
Imelda Marcos at the Bataan Death March Memorial

Ferdinand Marcos was elected as the 10th president of the Philippines on November 9, 1965. When he was inaugurated on December 30, 1965, Imelda officially became the First Lady.

The Romualdez clan had been torn apart by the presidential campaign. To fix this, Imelda allegedly sent out invitations to family members, some of whom supported the opposing party, and told them they were all welcome at their house on Ortega Street in San Juan, which was then part of Rizal.

Ferdinand and Imelda held Mass in the courtyard of their house on Ortega Street before proceeding to Luneta Park for the inauguration ceremonies.

At night, a state dinner hosted 60 guests in the reception hall of the Malacañang Palace.

=== Early projects ===
In the first three years of being First Lady, she spent ₱1 million for the beautification of the Paco Park and ₱24 million for the beautification of Fort Santiago.

In May 1966, Imelda pushed a twelve million peso plan to pool together the social welfare efforts of several dozen social welfare groups. The plan involved the construction of welfare villages and the reorientation of personnel to staff them. The cornerstone for first village, the Reception and Study Center in Quezon City was laid in 1966, and several more were built from then until 1968: Marilla Hills in Alabang, the Children's Orphanage in Pasay, the Molave Village in Tanay, Rizal, a Home for the Aged in Quezon City, and the Philippine Village at Manila International Airport.

In mid-1967, Imelda started the "Share for Progress" Seed Dispersal Program a project that suggested making vegetable gardens out of idle lots all over the country. By 1968, 309,392 kits containing seeds had been distributed in over 1500 towns.

=== Blue Ladies ===
The "Blue Ladies", a group initially composed of wives of political men in the Nacionalista Party, had played a critical role during Marcos's 1965 campaign. They contributed funds and provided publicity, giving the campaign a personal touch by visiting factories and farms to shake hands and have small conversations with voters, making door-to-door appeals in the slum areas. That year they also introduced to politics the purchase of radio and television time, to campaign for Marcos, through the use of little speeches for the voters. This was affordable because the Blue Ladies were mostly prominent matrons and/or beautiful youthful girls married to men of means.

Upon becoming First Lady, Imelda often asked members of the Blue Ladies to accompany her on her trips out of the country. One of her most famous socialite friends was Cristina Ford.

Imelda's Blue Ladies—specifically Maria Luisa, a daughter of the rich Madrigal family and the wife of Daniel Vazquez—contributed to the fashion spending of Imelda. In 1968, Maria Luisa accompanied Imelda on an overseas trip, during which Imelda and daughter Imee spent $3.3 million. At this time Vazquez and Maria Luisa opened a Citibank account. In November 1968, the couple added "Fernanda Vazquez" as a joint holder of the bank account. An allegation that Imelda and Fernanda Vazquez are one and the same is validated by the notations for the bank account that had Imelda Marcos's handwriting.

=== Beatles incident ===
On July 4, 1966, the First Lady invited the Beatles—then on tour in the Philippines—to perform at a private event in the Palace, but the invitation was declined. As a result of the rejection, an order to lock down Manila International Airport was enacted; this resulted in mobs trying to storm the band's hotel rooms and prevent them from leaving the country. There were also reports that a ₱100,000 tax assessment was issued to their manager.

=== Increased independence ===
The Dovie Beams scandal, which began as rumors in the late 1960s, eventually led to a significant change in Imelda's public role. President Marcos had met the American actress after she arrived in Manila in 1968 to play the female lead in Maharlika, a propaganda film portraying Ferdinand's supposed exploits during World War II. According to Beams, the two had an affair and she was moved into one of Ferdinand's safe houses, where she recorded their sexual encounters with Ferdinand's full consent. These tapes were later played in a press conference, causing great humiliation for Imelda.

Members of the Marcos Cabinet such as Cesar Virata and Gerardo Sicat recount that Imelda used the humiliation of the Dovie Beams affair as leverage to begin developing an independent political agenda which gave her more and more political power. Initially, this meant that Imelda had free rein on her projects while her husband prepared for the 1969 presidential campaign, but as Marcos's health declined, it involved her being put in increasingly powerful positions, including those of Minister of Human Settlements and of Governor of Metro Manila.

== Second term (1969–1972) ==
In July 1974, the annual Ms. Universe pageant was held in Manila, to which then First Lady Imelda Marcos allegedly spent ₱40 million (US$5.5 million) for the renovation of all public and private infrastructures throughout Manila, and the other cities in which the Ms. Universe pageant participants were subsequently toured.

=== Foreign relations roles ===
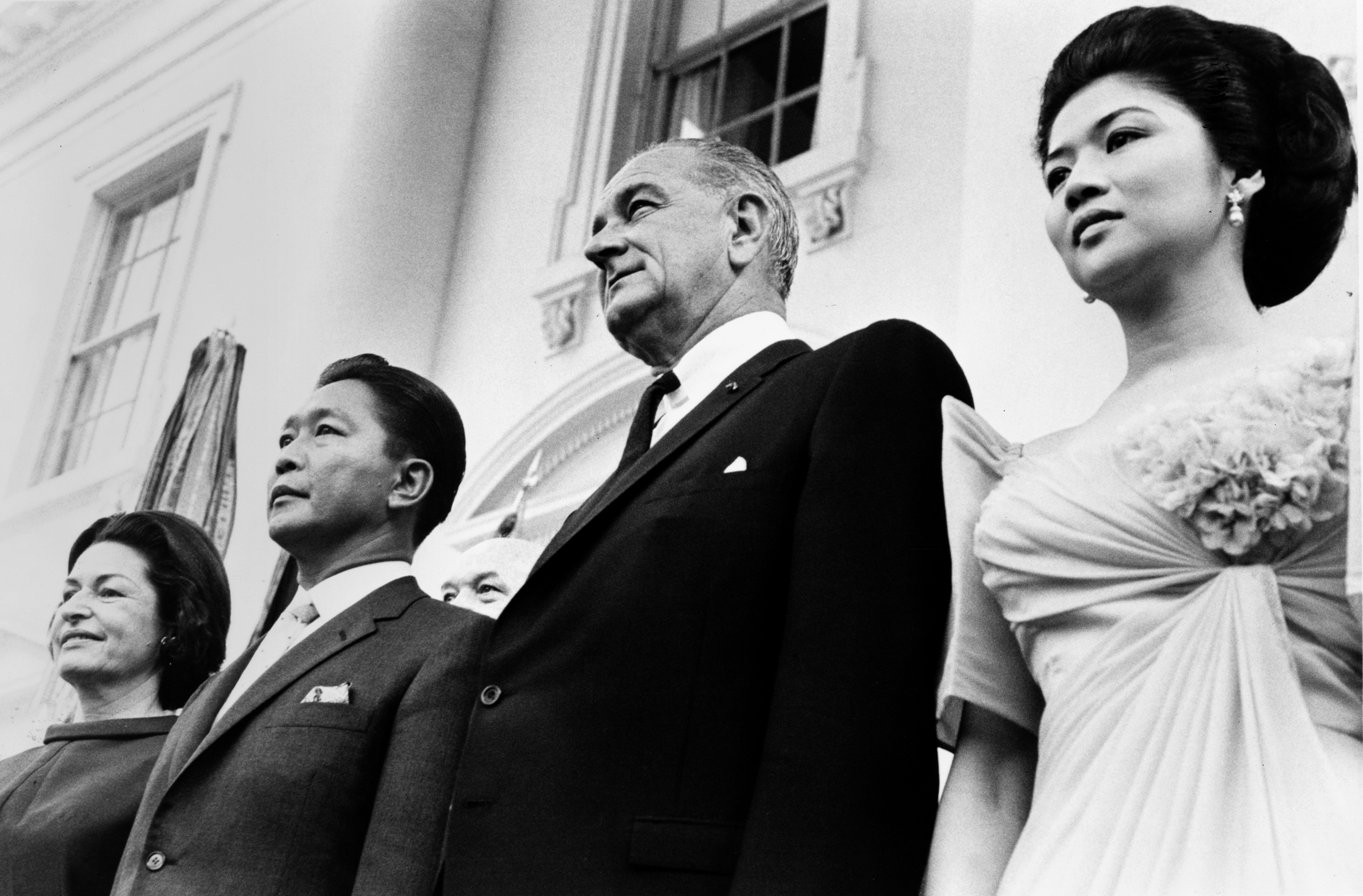
Ferdinand and Imelda Marcos with Lyndon B. and Lady Bird Johnson at the White House, 1966

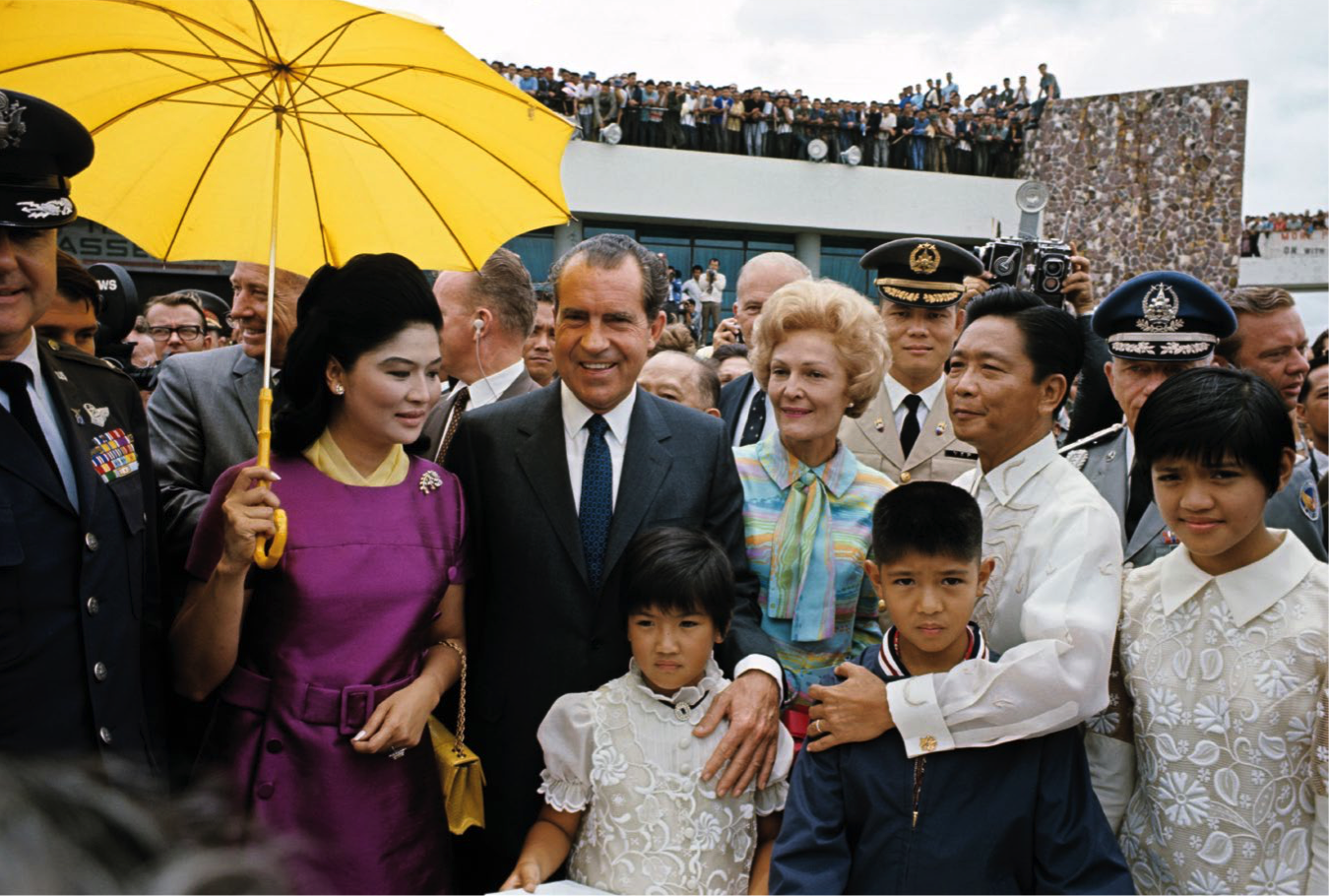
Richard and Pat Nixon with the Marcos family in Manila, 1969

Given that the President hardly left the Malacañang Palace, Ferdinand increasingly sent his wife on official visits to other countries as a de facto vice president.

When the Marcoses went to the United States in September 1966, President Lyndon B. Johnson offered Imelda the Philippine war damage claims totaling US$28 million. President Johnson agreed to have US$3.5 million be used as funds for the Cultural Center (CCP), one of Imelda's projects.

For the inauguration of the CCP, a gala opening of the Golden Salakot, a pageant-drama of a story about the prehistory of the Philippines, occurred on September 8, 1969. US President Richard Nixon was invited but instead California Governor (and future President) Ronald Reagan, along with his wife, flew to the country on Air Force One for the event. There were accounts that the First Lady attempted to bring other celebrities in by getting them tickets to ride Air Force One, but she was denied this luxury by President Nixon. Accounts have also mentioned that this trip by the then-Governor Reagan and his wife led to the closeness of the Reagans and Marcoses.

In 1971, Imelda attended Iran's 2,500-year celebration of the Persian Empire of the founding of the Persian Empire. This trip, according to palace insiders, provided her with a social introduction to some of the world's wealthiest people.

=== Accusation of bribery in Constitutional Convention ===
On May 19, 1972, the Constitutional Convention delegate for Leyte's first district, Eduardo Quintero, accused Imelda and thirteen others of bribing some of the convention members to vote against provisions which would have prevented Marcos from retaining power beyond the two four-year terms allowed him by the previous constitution.

In the stress following the accusations and media circus, Imelda claimed to have suffered a miscarriage. Later, this was revealed to be a hoax to avoid Quintero's charges. According to Ellison, this was "an eloquent example of the lengths to which Imelda would go to support [Ferdinand] and her ambition".

=== Actions preceding martial law ===
In Ferdinand's diary preceding May, he wrote that he and Imelda were planning to wager all their power and wealth "on a single throw of the dice of fate for the sake of the people and the Republic".

On the eve of September 5, 1972, tourism minister Manuel Elizalde called each member of Manila's foreign press corps to a party. Imelda arrived at the party, allegedly rambling about democracy and how only the Americans could afford it. 18 days later, Martial Law was announced. Ferdinand stated the purpose of the Martial Law was to create a "New Society" with reformed institutions, no inequalities, corruption, or crime. Imelda called it "martial law with a smile". Days after the announcement, a warrant of arrest was issued for Amelita Cruz, author of the "you-know-who" columns on Imelda. Cruz was told that the orders "came directly from the music room", Imelda's palace study.

== Martial law (1972–1981) ==
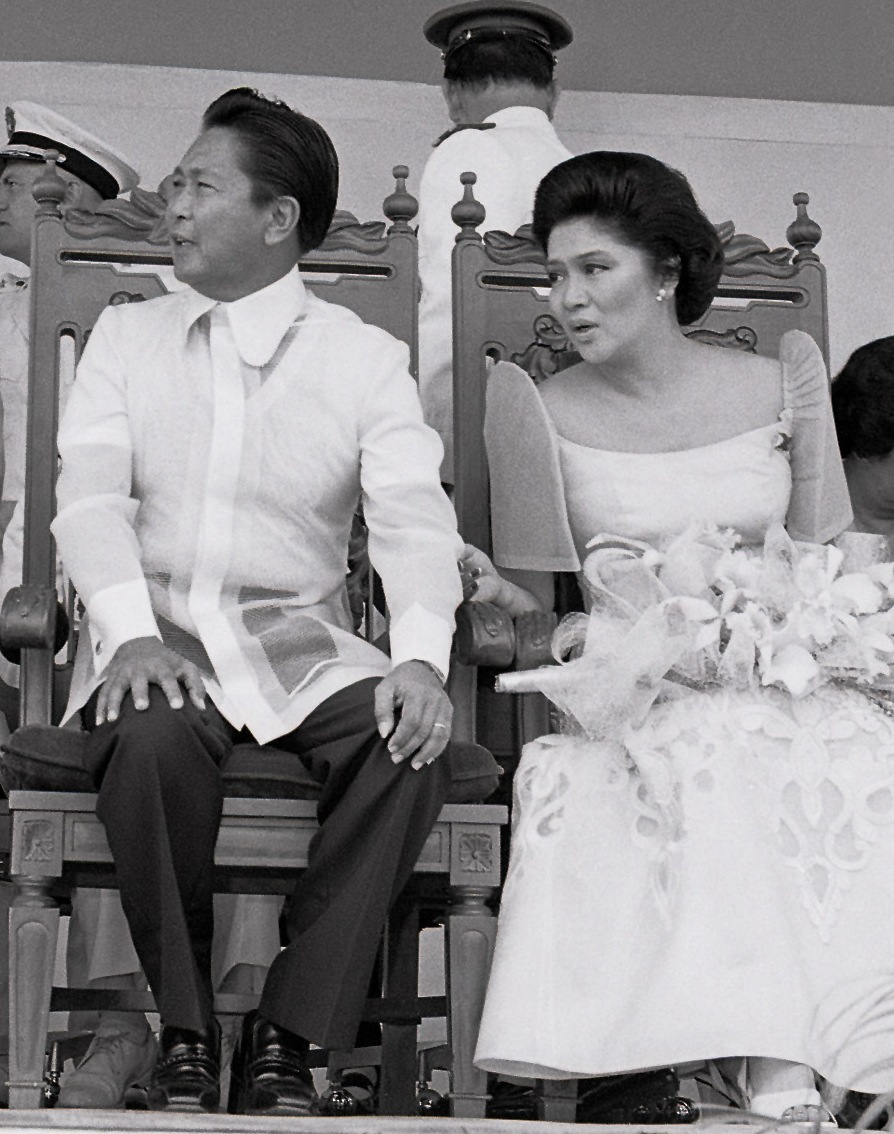
The Marcoses at a ceremony in 1979

During this time period, she orchestrated public events using national funds to bolster her and her husband's image. She secured the Miss Universe 1974 pageant in Manila, which required the construction of the Folk Arts Theater in less than three months. She organized the Kasaysayan ng Lahi, a festival showcasing Philippine history. She also initiated social programs, such as the Green Revolution, which was intended to address hunger by encouraging the people to plant produce in household gardens, and created a national family-planning program.

In 1972, she took control of the distribution of a bread ration called Nutribun, which actually came from the United States Agency for International Development (USAID).

=== Stabbing attack ===
An assassination attempt against Imelda Marcos occurred on December 7, 1972, when an assailant named Carlito Dimahilig tried to stab her on live television with a bolo knife in Nayong Pilipino but was shot by the police. Congressman Jose Aspiras and Linda Amor Robles were also injured in trying to subdue the attacker. The motive appeared to have been her role in her husband's presidency, but human rights dissidents believed it was staged by the government.

Marcos was immediately flown by helicopter to the Makati Medical Center, with her husband immediately driving to the hospital upon hearing the news while playing golf at Malacañang Park's Pangarap golf course.

=== Foreign relations roles ===
In 1972, Imelda Marcos initiated the first of many trips to the Soviet Union; it was dubbed as "cultural missions" but eventually led to the establishment of diplomatic relations between the Soviet Union and the Philippines.

In 1975, after the assassination of King Faisal of Saudi Arabia, Marcos wanted to extend the official condolences. Women were not welcome in the Saudi court, but Imelda, through her connection to the surgeon who previously performed a heart surgery on the new king, managed to be the first woman guest to be honored.

In 1978, she was also appointed as Ambassador Plenipotentiary and Extraordinary, allowing her to tour the United States, the Soviet Union, Yugoslavia, and Cuba. Throughout her travels, she became friends with Richard Nixon, Muammar Gaddafi, Saddam Hussein, Fidel Castro, and Josip Broz Tito. She traveled to Iraq to secure oil and to Libya for a peace treaty with the Moro National Liberation Front.

As First Lady, she frequently represented the Philippines abroad, describing her efforts as part of a broader mission to present the nation’s resilience and the strength of its people on the world stage.

=== Governor of Metro Manila ===
In 1975, Ferdinand Marcos issued Presidential Decree 824, establishing the Metro Manila Commission (MMC), the central government of Metro Manila. He named Imelda to head it, making her Governor of Metro Manila from that point until the Marcoses were deposed in 1986. From February 17 to June 12, 1978, Imelda took a leave of absence from the governorship to campaign for a seat in the Interim Batasang Pambansa, with Ferdinand Marcos serving as acting governor during that period.

=== Chairperson of the National Commission on the Role of the Filipino Women (NCRFW) ===
When the Philippine President enacted Presidential Decree No. 633 or the law that established the National Commission on the Role of Filipino Women (NCRFW) on January 7, 1975, Imelda Marcos was appointed as the first Chairperson.

=== Minister of Human Settlements ===
Ferdinand Marcos appointed Imelda to the position of Minister of Human Settlements in 1978—a post which she held until the EDSA Revolution of February 1986, and which allowed her to construct the Cultural Center of the Philippines, the Philippine Heart Center, the Lung Center of the Philippines, the Philippine International Convention Center, the Coconut Palace, the Manila Film Center, and the Calauit Safari Park.

=== Batasang Pambansa ===
In 1978, Kilusang Bagong Lipunan party fielded Imelda as a candidate in the Philippine parliamentary elections of 1978. Because most of the opposition candidates were either in jail or had limited mobility as a result of Martial Law, Imelda Marcos easily won a seat as a member of the Interim Batasang Pambansa (National Congress) representing Region IV (Metro Manila).

=== Role in Benigno Aquino Jr.'s exile ===
In 1980, after learning former Senator Benigno Aquino Jr. had a life-threatening heart ailment, Imelda convinced her husband to allow Aquino leave for the United States for medical treatment. This was arranged after a secret hospital visit by Imelda. Aquino supposedly agreed to her conditions that he return to the Philippines and not speak out against the Marcos regime in the US. Having made a quick recovery, Aquino decided to remain in the US, saying that "a pact with the devil is no pact at all".

Six months after martial law was lifted on January 17, 1981, Ferdinand Marcos was re-elected as president. While her husband began to suffer from lupus erythematosus, Imelda effectively ruled in his place.

Imelda claimed that during her last meeting with Aquino on May 21, 1983, in New York, she "begged him for 3½ hours to postpone his return to the Philippines until it was safe for him to come". Aquino returned to the Philippines on August 21, 1983, and was assassinated at Manila International Airport upon his arrival. Feeling that he was pressured into causing an investigation of the assassination, Ferdinand created the Agrava Commission, a fact-finding committee, to investigate the circumstances surrounding the assassination of Aquino Jr., ultimately finding the military guilty.

== Downfall ==
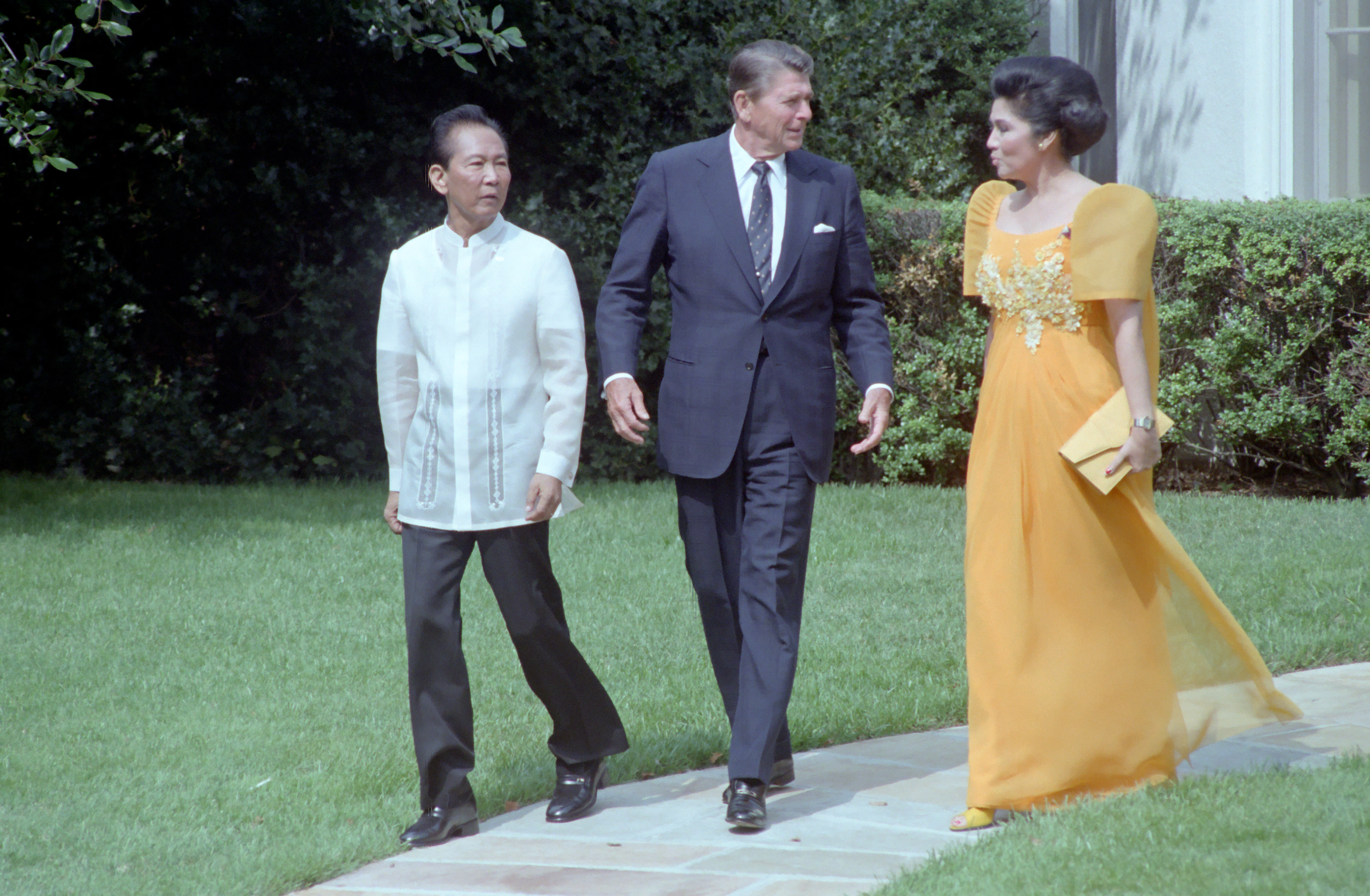
The Marcoses with President Reagan, 1982

On February 7, 1986, snap elections were held between Ferdinand Marcos and Corazon Aquino, the widow of Benigno Aquino Jr. Despite Ferdinand Marcos claiming to have won the election, allegations of vote rigging led to mass protests, later known as the People Power Revolution.

On February 25, Ferdinand Marcos, with his wife Imelda by his side, held the inauguration at Malacañang Palace. The couple later emerged on the Palace balcony in front of a loyalist crowd and Imelda sang a song for the crowd.

Later that day, Ferdinand Marcos finally agreed to step down and was given safe passage for him and his entire family to flee to Hawaii, United States.

== Exile in Hawaii (1986–1991) ==
At midnight, February 26, 1986, the Marcos family fled the country to Hawaii with a party of about 80 individuals – the extended Marcos family and a number of close associates. Their arrival was controversial, and soon led to Hawaii residents calling on the government to force the Marcoses to leave.

The US Government initially hosted the exiles at Hickam Air Force Base. Ferdinand and Imelda moved into a pair of residences in Makiki Heights, Honolulu, a month later.

Ferdinand Marcos eventually died in exile in September 1989. His son Bongbong was the only family member present at his deathbed.

After Imelda left Malacañang Palace, press reports worldwide took note of her lavish wardrobe, said to include 15 mink coats, 508 gowns, 888 handbags, and 3,000 pairs of shoes. Some news reports estimated that there were up to 7,500 pairs, but Time magazine reported that the final tally was 1,060. The US government documented that the Marcos family entered the United States with millions of dollars in cash, stocks, jewelry, and gold kilobars inscribed "To my husband on our 24th anniversary".

== Return from exile (1991–present) ==
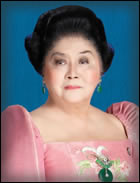
Official portrait of Marcos during the 16th Congress

On November 4, 1991, President Corazon Aquino allowed Imelda and her children to return to the Philippines so they could be formally charged in their tax fraud and corruption cases – part of the government's effort to convince Swiss courts to return the money in the Marcos's Swiss Bank accounts to the Philippine government.

After her return from exile, Imelda returned to politics.

In 1992, Imelda ran for president in the 1992 Philippine presidential election, finishing 5th out of 7 candidates.

She was elected as a congresswoman of Leyte during the 1995 Philippine general election, representing the first district, despite facing a disqualification lawsuit in which the Supreme Court ruled in her favor.

She chose not to seek re-election in Congress and instead sought the presidency again in the 1998 Philippine presidential election, but later withdrew to support the eventual winner Joseph Estrada, while she finished 9th among 11 candidates. She considered running for mayor of Manila in the 2001 Philippine general election but did not push through with it.

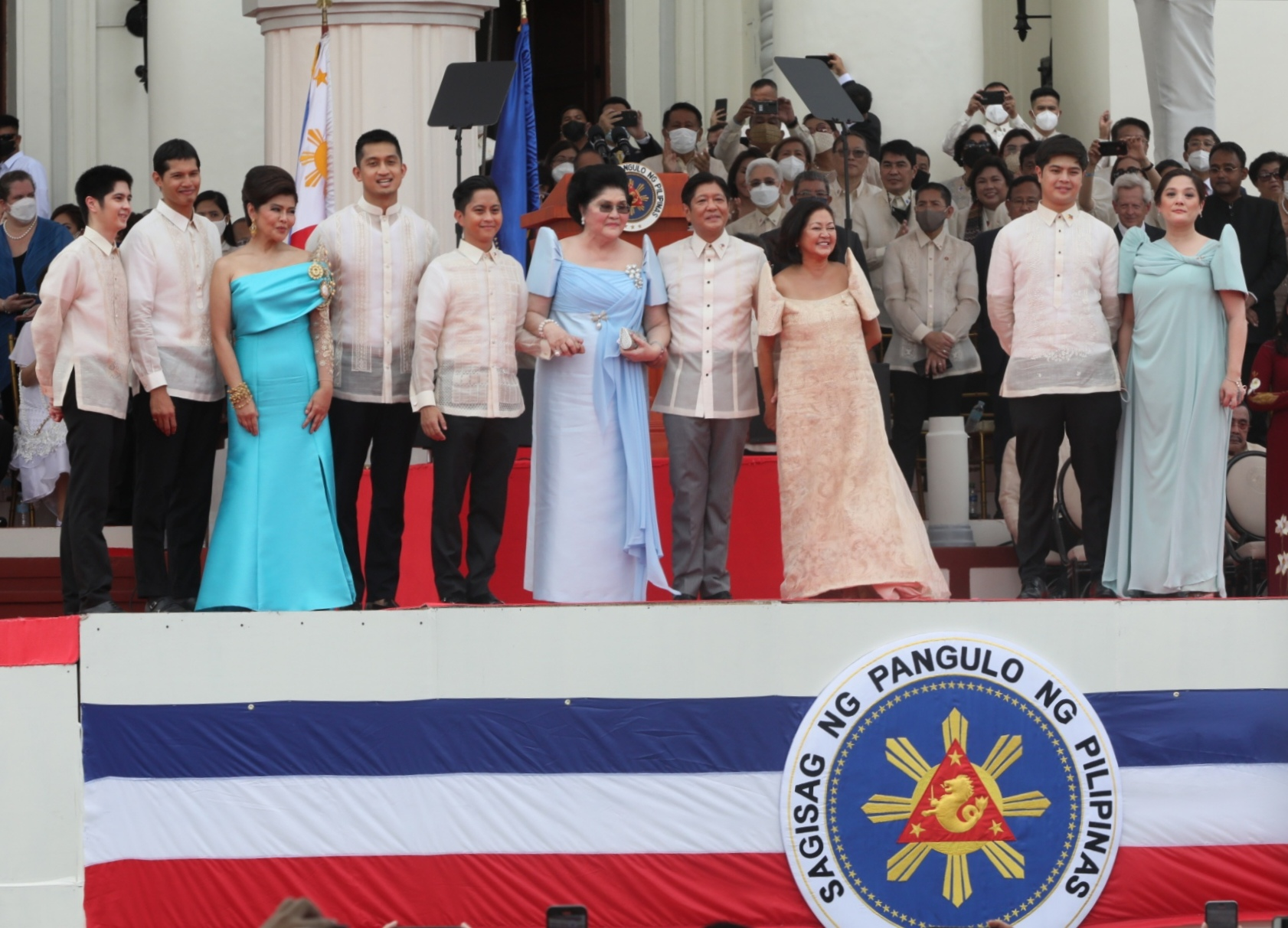
Imelda Marcos (6th from left) and her family during the inauguration of her son Bongbong in 2022

In November 2006, Marcos started her own business, a fashion label "Imelda Collection" including jewelry, clothing and shoes with the help of her daughter Imee.

Imelda ran for the second district of Ilocos Norte in the 2010 Philippine House of Representatives elections to replace her son, Ferdinand Jr. (Bongbong), who ran for senator under the Nacionalista Party. During her term, she held the position of Millennium Development Goals committee chair in the Lower House.

She was re-elected on May 14, 2013, and on May 9, 2016, for a third and final term.

In October 2018, Marcos filed her certificate of candidacy to run for governor of Ilocos Norte in the 2019 Philippine general election to replace her daughter, Imee, who was term-limited and chose to run for senator. However, following her conviction of graft, she withdrew from the race a month later and was substituted by her grandson Matthew Manotoc, initially her running mate for vice governor. Manotoc eventually won the gubernatorial race.

Marcos underwent a successful angioplasty at St. Luke's Medical Center – Global City, Taguig on May 7, 2023. She was hospitalized in March 2024 after contracting a suspected case of pneumonia.

On 18 November 2026, Marcos met with her longtime friend, U.S President Donald Trump at Malacañang Palace in Manila during his visit to the Philippines, where he held a meeting with her son, the current president of the Philippines.

== Major court cases ==
Imelda Marcos has been involved in court cases against her in the Philippines and abroad. Some of these, such as her corruption charges in the Philippines, are criminal cases. Others, such as the rulings of the Swiss Federal Court on her bank accounts, are either civil or forfeiture cases.

=== 1988 racketeering case (Manhattan) ===
In October 1988, Ferdinand and Imelda Marcos, together with eight associates (including Adnan Khashoggi, a Saudi Arabian businessman and weapons smuggler believed to have been involved with her husband's regime), were indicted by a federal grand jury in Manhattan on charges of racketeering, conspiracy, fraud and obstruction of justice. She pleaded not guilty to federal charges that she used $103 million in stolen government funds to buy Manhattan real estate and art. Tobacco heiress Doris Duke posted $5 million bail for the former First Lady. The Marcos couple's defense team was led by criminal defense attorney Gerry Spence. Actor George Hamilton, an unindicted co-conspirator, testified at trial under a grant of immunity, acknowledging that he had received a $5.5-million loan from Marcos's associate. In July 1990, following a three-month trial, she was acquitted of all charges, after Imelda had successfully characterized herself as "a poor widow who knew nothing about her husband’s activities."

=== 1990 Swiss Federal Supreme Court forfeiture case ===
In 1990, the Federal Supreme Court of Switzerland ruled that funds in the Marcoses' Swiss bank accounts were of "criminal provenance". This cleared the way for the transfer of assets worth around $356 million back to the Philippines. These assets were previously frozen by Swiss courts in 1986 shortly after the People Power Revolution. The decision eventually led to reforms in 1998 that made it more difficult for dictators and criminals to keep their money in the Swiss banking system.

=== 1995 human rights violations class suit (Hawaii) ===
In February 1995, the United States District Court for the District of Hawaii ruled against the Marcoses, awarding $1.96 billion to 9,539 victims of human rights violations during the Marcos dictatorship. This decision was upheld by US 9th Circuit Court of Appeals in 1996. The ruling has yet to be enforced in the Philippines due to jurisdiction issues.

=== Corruption cases in the Philippines ===
Upon the Marcos family's return to the Philippines in the early 1990s, 28 criminal cases were filed against Mrs. Marcos by the Philippines' Office of the Ombudsman from 1991 to 1995. These included cases of graft and malversation of public funds.

In 1993, Marcos was convicted on a graft case. This was overturned by the Appellate Court in 2008, and the reversal was upheld by the Philippine Supreme Court in 2018 because of technical issues with the evidence.

In March 2008, a judge in Manila acquitted her of 32 counts of illegal transfers of funds to Swiss bank accounts between 1968 and 1976, determining that the government had failed to prove its case.

In 2011, the Sandiganbayan Fifth Division ordered her to return US$280,000 in government funds taken by her and her husband from the National Food Authority. On November 9, 2018, the Sandiganbayan convicted Marcos on seven counts of graft and corruption, which disqualified Marcos from holding any public office.

In October 2015, Imelda Marcos still faced 10 criminal charges of graft and 25 civil cases in the Philippines.

=== 2018 Swiss foundation cases convictions ===
In 1991, Marcos was indicted on ten corruption charges in the Philippines' anti-graft court, the Sandiganbayan.

Twenty-seven years later, on November 9, 2018, she was convicted on seven counts of violating the Anti-Graft and Corrupt Practices Act, for funneling roughly US$200 million to various Swiss foundations while she was still serving as governor of Metro Manila in the 1970s. That same day, the court announced her acquittal on the three remaining counts, but since she failed to appear, the court also ordered the forfeiture of the earlier bond that she had posted in 1991.

She was sentenced to prison terms ranging from six to eleven years for each count – totalling a minimum of 42 years and 7 months, and a maximum of 77 years. The Sandiganbayan also disqualified Marcos, a representative for the first district of Ilocos Norte and a candidate for governor of the same province, from holding any public office. The sanction will not go into immediate effect, pending an appeal by her, but she nonetheless withdrew her candidacy for the governorship.

On November 12, 2018, Marcos's attorney filed a "Motion for Leave of Court to Avail of Post-Conviction Remedies", which included a provision for bail. The court granted bail due to her "ill health", but reserved ruling on the balance of the requests until November 28. Marcos posted bail on November 16, 2018, a week after her conviction. She intends to appeal her conviction. The normal form of appeal is a motion for reconsideration to the Sandiganbayan; she further requested a direct appeal to the Philippine Supreme Court, which was originally denied as premature, then granted on November 28.

== Personal wealth ==
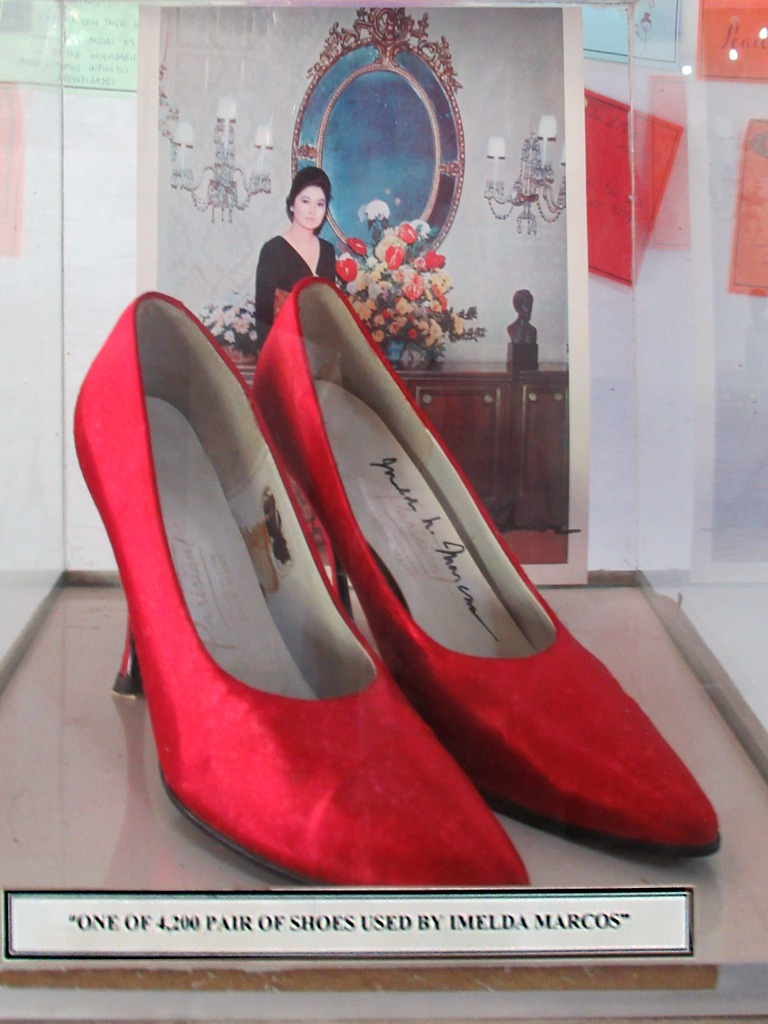
A pair of shoes from Marcos's infamous collection

=== Court rulings and estimated amount ===
The Philippine Supreme Court considers the unexplained wealth of Ferdinand and Imelda Marcos to be "ill-gotten" based on the definitions set forth in Republic Act 1379, which was passed in 1955. The Supreme Court's interpretation of R.A. 1379 says that property acquired by a public officer or employee which is "manifestly out of proportion to his salary as such public officer and to his other lawful income" is "presumed prima facie to have been unlawfully acquired". The bulk of the assets of the Marcoses, including the Marcos jewels, were treated as unlawful in a 2012 decision which specified that "according to the Official Report of the Minister of Budget, the total salaries of former President Marcos as President from 1966 to 1976 was ₱60,000 a year and from 1977 to 1985, ₱100,000 a year; while that of the former First Lady, Imelda R. Marcos, as Minister of Human Settlements from June 1976 to February 22–25, 1986 was ₱75,000 a year" – about $304,372.43.

Estimates of this ill-gotten wealth vary, with sources estimating a figure of about US$5 billion to US$10 billion for wealth acquired in the last years of the Marcos administration. The Daily Telegraph estimates her current net worth at a more modest $22M (the amount declared by Imelda Marcos in 2012), but states that it is likely that she and her husband stole billions of pesos while in power, and that the amount they stole could have paid off the entirety of the Philippine foreign debt.

In a 1985 report to the United States Congress House Committee on Foreign Affairs, US Ambassador to the Philippines Stephen Bosworth estimated that the Marcoses had stolen an accumulated wealth of US$10 billion "in recent years", in the context of the rapid decline of the Philippine economy in the early 1980s. The same figure was cited by the Philippines' Office of the Solicitor General soon after Marcos was deposed by the EDSA Revolution in 1986. Bosworth's source, Dr. Bernardo Villegas of the Philippine think tank the Center for Research and Communication (CRC), noted that the figure ultimately cited by Bosworth was a conservative estimate, and that the amount probably came closer to $13 billion.

The PCGG's first chairperson, Jovito Salonga, later said that he estimated the figure to be US$5 billion to US$10 billion, based on the documentary trail left behind by the Marcoses in 1986. Internationally, Salonga's estimate has become the popularly cited estimate of the Marcoses' unexplained wealth. Dr. Jesus Estanislao, another noted economist from the CRC, said this figure reflected amounts taken out of the country in the years immediately prior to the ouster of the Marcos administration, and that there was no way to accurately estimate the wealth acquired by the Marcoses since the 1950s. He suggested that the figure could be as much as $30 billion.

Aside from the Marcoses' amassed wealth, Imelda Marcos was famous for spending it, with some accounts calling her "the ultimate personification of conspicuous consumption". On one occasion, Imelda spent $2,000 on chewing gum at the San Francisco International Airport and, on another, forced a plane to do a U-turn mid-air because she had forgotten to buy cheese in Rome. A portion of her famous shoe collection is now kept in the National Museum of the Philippines, while another is displayed in a shoe museum in Marikina. Typhoon Haiyan (Yolanda) damaged her ancestral home in Tacloban, which also serves as a museum, although she still retains homes in Ilocos Norte and Makati, where she resides.

=== Sequestration ===
Some of this wealth has been recovered as the result of various court cases – and has either been returned to the Philippine government, or awarded as reparations to the victims of human rights abuses under Marcos's presidency. Some of it has also been recovered by the Philippine government through settlements and compromise deals, either with Imelda or cronies who say that certain properties had been entrusted to them by the Marcoses. Some of the recovery cases have been dismissed by the courts for reasons such as improper case filing procedures and technical issues with documentary evidence. An amount of unidentified proportions has yet to be recovered, as the full extent of the family's wealth remains unknown.

In March 1968, Ferdinand and Imelda opened four accounts, under the names of William Saunders and Jane Ryan, with Credit Suisse in Zürich,—Marcos using the alias "William Saunders" and Imelda using the alias "Jane Ryan". These were later moved into other accounts under various dummy foundations, but when relevant records were discovered by the new Philippine government after the 1986 EDSA revolution, the Swiss Federal council froze them. On December 21, 1990, the Swiss Federal Supreme Court ruled that these accounts could be turned over to the Philippine government, on the condition that there be a concurring "final and absolute judgment" by a Philippine court. In 1997, the Swiss Federal Supreme Court established the funds to have been "of criminal provenance" and permitted their transfer to an escrow account in Manila, pending a ruling from a Philippine court which came in the form a confiscation ruling by the Philippine Supreme court on July 15, 2003. Switzerland finally released a total of $683 million in Marcos funds to the Philippines Treasury in 2004.

Throughout the 1980s, Imelda Marcos bought four prominent buildings in Manhattan. These were the US$51 million Crown Building at the corner of 57th and Fifth; 40 Wall Street, later renamed the Trump building; the US$60 million Herald Center; and the building at 200 Madison Avenue. She declined to buy the Empire State Building because she felt it was "too ostentatious".

On January 13, 2014, three collections of Imelda Marcos's jewelry: the Malacanang collection, the Roumeliotes collection, and the Hawaii collection; along with paintings by Claude Monet were seized by the Philippine government. In 2015, a rare pink diamond worth $5 million was discovered in her jewelry collection. The value of the three collections was appraised to be at about $21 million on February 16, 2016, when the government of the Philippines announced their intention to auction them off. They had not been sold as of April 17, 2020.

Her property also used to include a 175-piece art collection, which included works by Michelangelo, Botticelli, Canaletto, Raphael, as well as Monet's L'Église et La Seine à Vétheuil (1881), Alfred Sisley's Langland Bay (1887), and Albert Marquet's Le Cyprès de Djenan Sidi Said (1946). On October 17, 2013, the attempted sale of two Claude Monet paintings, L'Eglise de Vetheuil and Le Bassin Aux Nymphéas, became the subject of a legal case in New York against Vilma Bautista, a one-time aide to Imelda Marcos. Bautista was sentenced in 2014 to 2–6 years in prison for attempting to sell "valuable masterpieces that belonged to her country".

All told, about P170 billion worth of the Marcos wealth had been recovered by the PCGG by 2018 from the Marcoses – about $3.6 billion out of their $5–10 billion estimated ill-gotten wealth.

=== Net worth in 2012 ===
In 2012, Imelda Marcos declared her net worth to be US$22 million and was likewise listed as the second-richest Filipino politician behind boxer and politician Manny Pacquiao. She has claimed without evidence that her fortune came from Ferdinand Marcos's discovery of Yamashita's gold, a semi-mythical treasure trove that is widely believed in the Philippines to be part of the Japanese loot in World War II.

But Marcos has also said in interviews that "If you know how rich you are, you are not rich. But me, I am not aware of the extent of my wealth. That's how rich we are."

=== World record for largest theft from a government ===
The amount the Marcoses were estimated to have plundered from the Philippines is so large that it has been the subject of world records. Imelda Marcos, together with her husband Ferdinand (who is considered by many to be one of the greatest plunderers in history according to the Washington Post), were jointly credited in 1989 by Guinness World Records with the largest-ever theft from a government: an estimated 5 billion to 10 billion dollars salted away. She is quoted as having stated: "We practically own everything in the Philippines, from electricity, telecommunications, airlines, banking, beer and tobacco, newspaper publishing, television stations, shipping, oil and mining, hotels and beach resorts, down to coconut milling, small farms, real estate and insurance." In 2009, Imelda Marcos was listed by Newsweek as being one of the "greediest people of all time". To this, Marcos replied: "I plead guilty. For me, greedy is giving. I was first lady for 20 years, you have to be greedy first to give to all. It is natural. The only things we keep in life are those we give away."

== Edifice complex ==
The term "edifice complex" has been applied to Imelda and her penchant for grandiose public buildings, often constructed in impossibly short order. Imelda's building projects were often of the Brutalist architectural style characterized by fortress-like, massive shapes intended to effect a sense of grandiosity.

In 1966, Ferdinand Marcos issued Executive Order No. 60, establishing the Cultural Center of the Philippines and appointing its board of directors. The board elected Imelda as their chairperson, giving her the legal mandate to negotiate and manage funds for the center.

The Cultural Center of the Philippines (CCP) Complex is considered the premier symbol of Imelda's edifice complex. It was designed by architect Leandro Locsin and was built on a reclaimed land along Roxas Boulevard in Manila and covered an area of about 21 hectares (52 acres). Ninety thousand pesos was granted by the Philippine-American Culture Foundation for its construction and was aided with funds from the Cultural Development Fund and the Special Fund for Education. Upon completion, it amounted to ₱50 million—a 50 000% increase from the original budget. Although it is notable that prices of the construction materials such as cement, steel, and tiles increased by 30% to 40% within this time frame, the escalation in the increase of the expenditures are highly questionable. Imelda called the CCP Complex the "sanctuary of the Filipino soul," as it became the locus of all state-initiated cultural productions.

Another construction project linked with Imelda during her husband's first term as President is the San Juanico Bridge, which links the island of Samar to Imelda's home province, Leyte. Although it wasn't initiated by Imelda herself, it was promoted by the administration as Ferdinand Marcos's gift to his wife. It was funded with foreign loans of US$22 million (about ₱140 million), from Japan's Overseas Technical Cooperation Agency (OTCA), the predecessor of today's Japan International Cooperation Agency (JICA). Upon its completion on July 2, 1973, Imelda's birthday, economists and public works engineers quickly tagged it as a white elephant which was "constructed several decades too soon," because its average daily traffic (ADT) was too low to justify the cost of its construction.

== Cultural influence ==
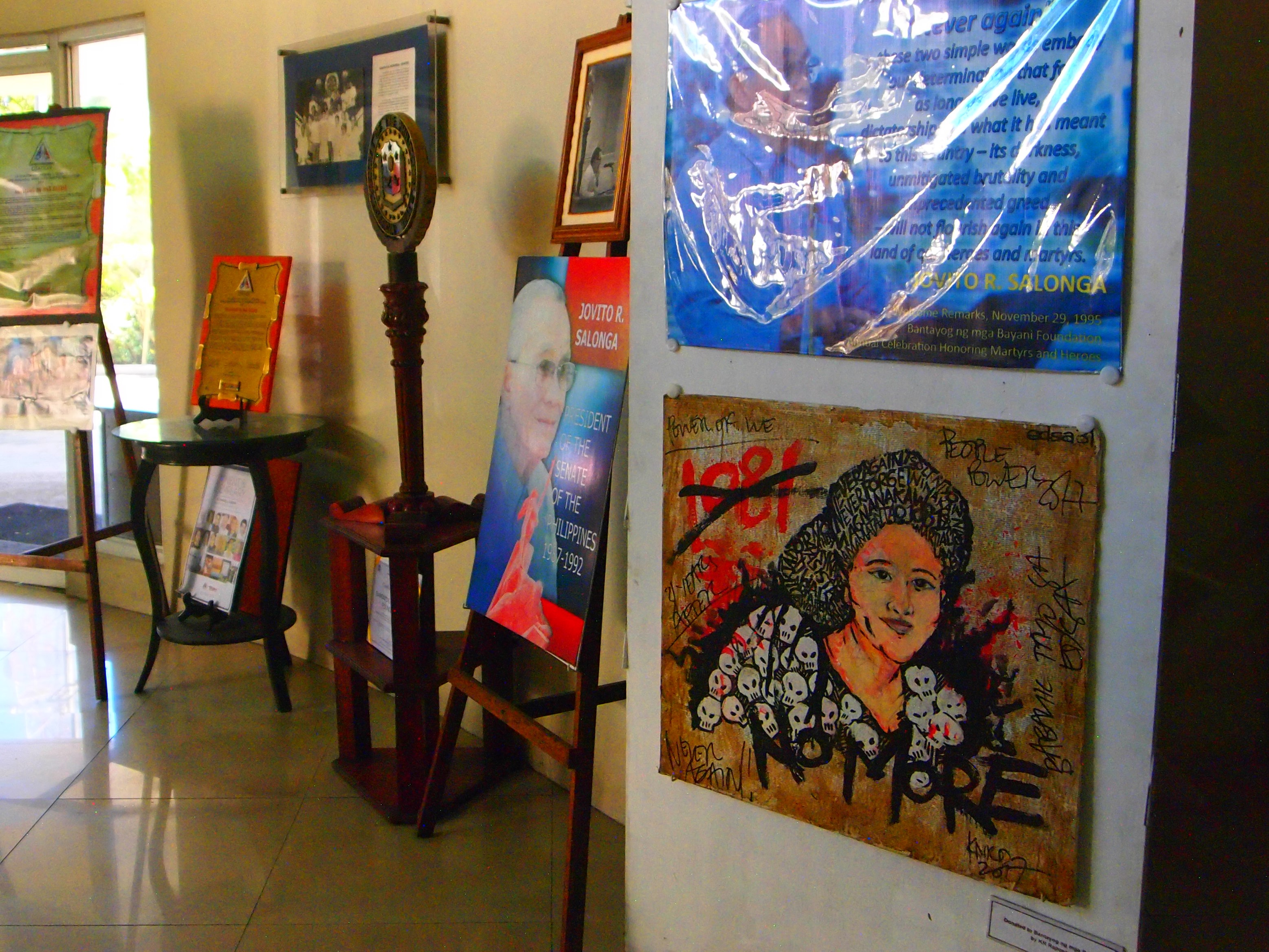
Imelda Marcos features prominently in protest art displayed in the lobby of the Bantayog ng mga Bayani Museum, which documents the events of the Marcos Dictatorship and "honors the heroes and martyrs that fought the regime".

=== "Imeldific" ===
In the late 1980s, the revelation that Imelda Marcos had "amassed a huge collection of art, jewellery, property and – most famously – at least 1,000 pairs of shoes", had turned her into a household name, frequently compared to Marie Antoinette of France, except "with shoes".

This led to the coining of the Philippine English adjective "Imeldific", to describe

"anything exaggeratedly ostentatious or in bad taste", referring to clothing, architecture, décor, etc.

It also refers to people who have "the Imelda Marcos syndrome" – tending to be extravagant and not being afraid to flaunt it, or to describe a lifestyle of "ostentatious extravagance".

It has also come to be used in International English, with dictionary writer and the Atlantic columnist Anne Soukhanov expounding on the "ostentatious extravagance" etymology. In popular international media, the Sydney Morning Herald's Jackie Dent said it simply "means to be ... well, like Imelda".

The coining of the term is often attributed to Imelda Marcos, although it was used by People Magazine's Carlos Lopez as early as April 1986, when he said:

Well, at least Mrs. Marcos has made a significant contribution to our lexicon. To call something "imeldific" describes it as a shameless and vulgar extravagance.

=== Fashion ===
Marcos influenced fashion in the Philippines, although her role as a patroness of the arts and fashion is still controversial. For instance, she actively promoted the terno, which also became her sartorial symbol, through projects such as "Bagong Anyo" and exhibitions abroad such as the Philippine contribution to the Expo '75 in Okinawa Japan.

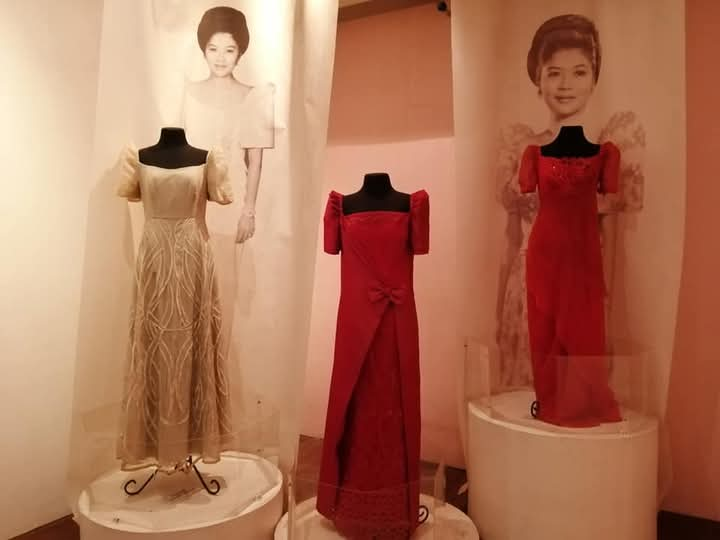
Terno gown collection of Imelda Marcos exhibited at the Ferdinand E. Marcos Presidential Center, Batac, Ilocos Norte

Imelda made a conscious effort to portray herself as a patron of the arts, including those who specialize in Filipino haute couture such as Pitoy Moreno and Inno Sotto.

In a section of the 2003 Ramona Diaz film named after her, Imelda says that she maintains her extravagant clothing because it "inspired the poor to dress better".

=== Portrayals in news and art ===
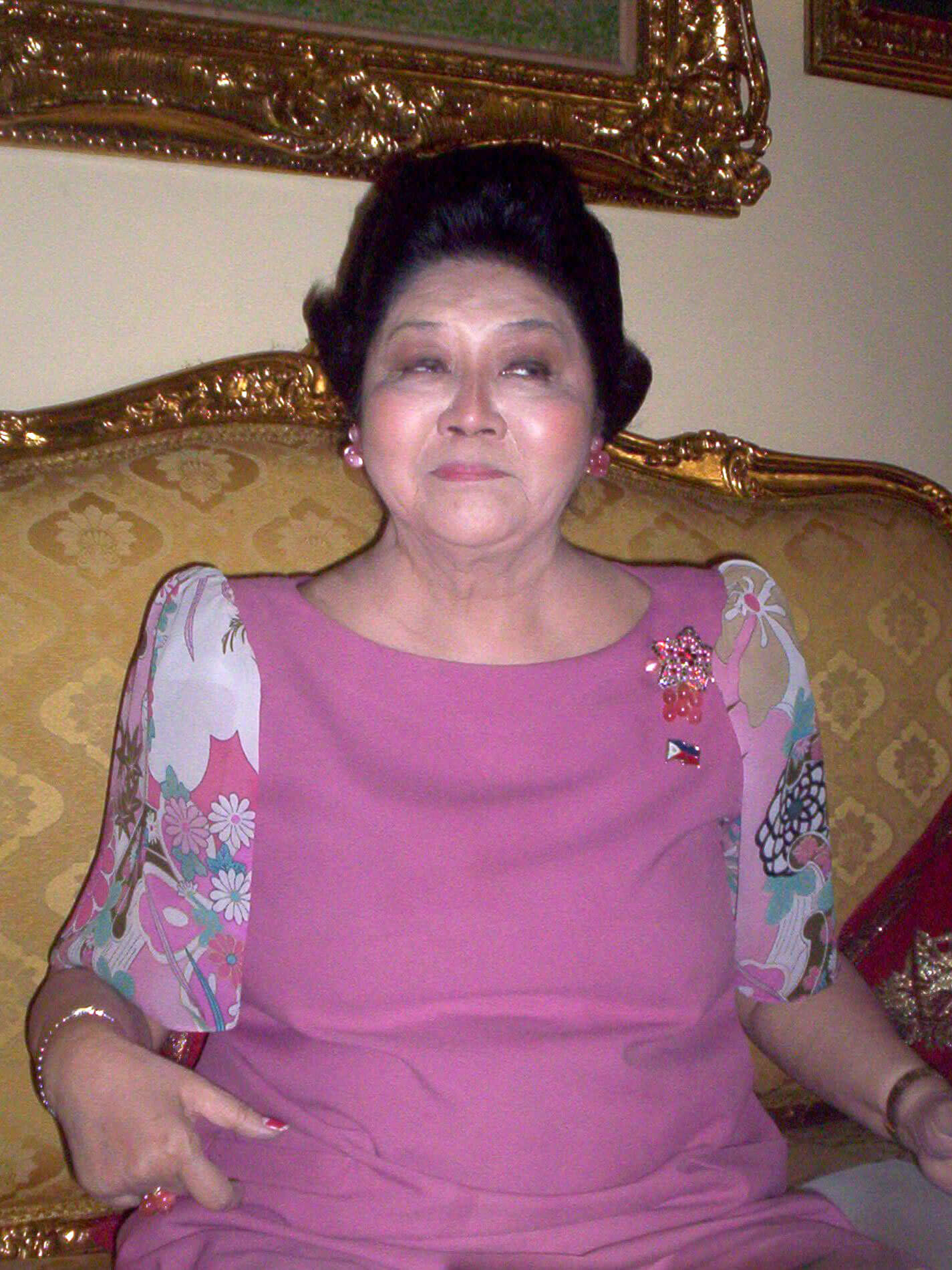
Marcos in 2008

In August 2019, writer/director Lauren Greenfield debuted her documentary film The Kingmaker at the 76th Venice Film Festival, after which it premiered at the Telluride Film Festival, the Toronto International Film Festival, and the London Film Festival, the first documentary to ever debut at all four festivals in the same year. The documentary features the political career of Imelda Marcos with a focus on the Marcos family's efforts to rehabilitate the family's image and to return to political power – including her plans to see her son Bongbong become Vice President of the Philippines. It has a 97% fresh rating from Rotten Tomatoes and a 76/100 from Metacritic.

In the late 1990s, Imelda Marcos agreed to be the subject of a television documentary episode for PBS's Independent Lens, simply titled Imelda, by Ramona S. Diaz. Released in 2003, the film documents her marriage to future President of the Philippines Ferdinand Marcos, her rule under the dictatorship, her exile in Hawaii and her eventual return to the Philippines. Imelda had its world premiere at the International Documentary Film Festival Amsterdam and its North American premiere in the documentary competition of the 2004 Sundance Film Festival, where it won the Excellence in Cinematography Award Documentary. The film was also screened at the Maryland Film Festival in Baltimore. It has a 94% fresh rating from Rotten Tomatoes and a 69/100 from Metacritic. Imelda Marcos obtained a temporary injunction that prevented the film from being shown in the Philippines for a brief time. When the injunction was canceled and the film was released, it earned more than Spider-Man 2 and was considered a hit.

The villain character "Madame" in the popular Filipino Comic Book series Trese is known for being a visual reference to Marcos, with her coiffed hair, butterfly sleeves, and deep connections to the powerful figures of the Trese universe.

The second track of Mark Knopfler's 1996 album Golden Heart is a sardonic song about her. In 2010, British producer Fatboy Slim and musician David Byrne released a concept album about her life called Here Lies Love, which later became a rock musical of the same name.

In Manila, local performance artist Carlos Celdran became known for his Living La Vida Imelda walking tour, which was also performed in Dubai in 2012. Filipino-American drag artist Manila Luzon impersonated Mrs. Marcos in the "Snatch Game" challenge in the third season of RuPaul's Drag Race, deriving humor from the First Lady's renowned obsession with shoes. Hawaiian comedian Frank De Lima has impersonated her on various occasions.

In an episode of Saturday Night Live (aired October 8, 1988), she was portrayed by comedienne Nora Dunn during the segment Weekend Update. She was also portrayed by Clavel Bendaña on the 2003 film Chavit (film).

She is also portrayed by actress Dimples Romana on the Maalaala Mo Kaya episode entitled Makinilya, the second of the two-part "The Ninoy & Cory Aquino Story" aired on ABS-CBN in 2010. Actress Ruffa Gutierrez also portrayed her in the 2022 film Maid in Malacañang and its sequel, the 2023 film Martyr or Murderer; actress Cindy Miranda portrays the young Marcos in the latter.

She is frequently mentioned in Netflix shows like Russian Doll (episode: "Coney Island Baby"), The Crown (episode: "Fairytale") and Dynasty (episode: "A Litte Father-Daughter Chat").

An original musical, Here Lies Love by David Byrne and Fatboy Slim, spans her life from childhood to exile and utilizes largely disco and club music and innovative immersive staging. The title is a direct reference to a phrase Imelda mentioned she wanted written on her tombstone. Originally conceived as a song cycle, it was presented in concert (Adelaide 2006, Carnegie Hall 2007) format and presented at Mass MoCA (2012) and Off-Broadway (2013, 2014–15) at the Public Theatre. The Broadway transfer began previews at the Broadway Theatre on June 17, 2023, with opening night on July 20, 2023 and closed on November 26 of that year.

== Electoral history ==
Electoral history of Imelda Marcos
Year	Office	Party	Votes received				Result
Year	Office	Party	Total	%	P.	Swing	Result
1978	Mambabatas Pambansa (Assemblyman) from Region IV – Metro Manila	KBL	1,795,120	3.24%	1st	—N/a	Won
1992	President of the Philippines	KBL	2,338,294	10.32%	5th	—N/a	Lost
1998	President of the Philippines	KBL	232,714	1.11%	9th	—N/a	Withdrawn
1995	Representative (Leyte–1st)	KBL	70,471	65.67%	1st	—N/a	Won
2010	Representative (Ilocos Norte–2nd)	KBL	109,571	80.02%	1st	—N/a	Won
2013	Representative (Ilocos Norte–2nd)	KBL	94,484	76.13%	1st	-3.89	Won
2016	Representative (Ilocos Norte–2nd)	Nacionalista	134,725	98.47%	1st	+22.34	Won

== Honors ==
- Japan: Grand Cordon (Paulownia) of the Order of the Precious Crown

== Notes ==
Honorary titles
Preceded by Eva Macapagal	First Lady of the Philippines; 1965–1986	Vacant Title next held by Amelita Ramos
Political offices
New office	Governor of Metro Manila; 1975–1986	Succeeded by Joey Lina (Acting)
House of Representatives of the Philippines
Preceded by Cirilo Roy Montejo	Member of the House of Representatives from Leyte's 1st district 1995–1998	Succeeded by Alfred Romualdez
Preceded by Bongbong Marcos	Member of the House of Representatives from Ilocos Norte's 2nd district 2010–2019	Succeeded by Eugenio Angelo Barba
Party political offices
Preceded by Ferdinand Marcos	Kilusang Bagong Lipunan nominee for President of the Philippines; 1992, 1998	Vacant Title next held by Vetellano Acosta
