= Trial of the century =

Sensationalistic idiom for court cases

"Trial of the century" is an idiomatic phrase used to describe certain well-known court cases, especially of the 19th, 20th and 21st centuries. It is often used popularly as a rhetorical device to attach importance to a trial and as such is not an objective observation. The Encyclopedia Britannica Online noted:

The spectacle of the driven prosecutor, the impassioned defense attorney, and the accused, whose fate hangs in the balance, has received ample treatment in literature, on stage, and on the silver screen. More than once such events have been excitedly referred to as "the trial of the century!"

Attorney F. Lee Bailey and The Washington Post observed in 1999:

Calling court cases "the trial of the century" is a traditional bit of American hyperbole, like calling a circus "The Greatest Show on Earth". Nearly every juicy tabloid trial in our history was called the "trial of the century" by somebody. "Every time I turn around, there's a new trial of the century," said defense attorney F. Lee Bailey. "It's a kind of hype," he says. "It's a way of saying, 'This is really fabulous. It's really sensational.' But it doesn't really mean anything."

In 1907, Harry K. Thaw was tried for the murder of Stanford White. Irvin S. Cobb, a contemporary reporter, explained why the trial fascinated the country so much:

You see, it had in it wealth, degeneracy, rich old wasters, delectable young chorus girls and adolescent artists' models; the behind-the-scenes of Theatredom and the Underworld, and the Great White Way ... the abnormal pastimes and weird orgies of overly aesthetic artists and jaded debauchees. In the cast of the motley show were Bowery toughs, Harlem gangsters, Tenderloin panderers, Broadway leading men, Fifth Avenue clubmen, Wall Street manipulators, uptown voluptuaries and downtown thugs.

== List of cases ==
=== 19th century ===
- Trial of Madeleine Smith (1857)
- Dred Scott v. Sandford (1857)
- Trial of John Brown (1859)
- Impeachment trial of Andrew Johnson (1868)
- Trial of Charles J. Guiteau for the assassination of United States president James A. Garfield (1881)
- Trial of Lizzie Borden for the double murder of her father and stepmother (1893)
- Trial of Alfred Dreyfus for treason (Dreyfus Affair) (1894–1899)

=== 20th century ===
- Trial of Leon Czolgosz for the assassination of William McKinley (1901)
- Trial of Harry Thaw for the murder of Stanford White (1906)
- Trial of Bill Haywood for murder (1907)
- Sacco and Vanzetti murder trial (1920–27)
- Trial of Roscoe Arbuckle for the rape and murder of Virginia Rappe (1921)
- Leopold and Loeb murder trial (1924)
- Scopes Trial (1925)
- Hall–Mills murder case (1926)
- Scottsboro Boys trials (1931–1937)
- Lindbergh kidnapping trial (1935)
- Nuremberg trials (1945–1946)
- Tokyo war crimes tribunal (1946–1948)
- Subsequent Nuremberg trials (1946–1949)
- Victor Kravchenko versus Les Lettres Françaises (1949)
- Hiss–Chambers (Hiss Case/Hiss Affair) (1948–1950)
- Julius and Ethel Rosenberg espionage trial (1951)
- Sam Sheppard trials (1954–1966)
- Adolf Eichmann trial (1961)
- Charles Manson and Manson Family for the Tate–LaBianca murders (1970)
- Trial of Jeremy Thorpe for conspiring to murder Norman Josiffe (Thorpe affair) (1979)
- Ted Bundy Chi Omega Trial (1979)
- Claus von Bülow trials (1982–1985)
- Trial of Nicolae and Elena Ceaușescu (1989)
- Trial of Lyle and Erik Menendez (1990)
- Trial of Imelda Romualdez Marcos (1990)
- Rodney King beating trials (1992–1993)
- Trial of Mayor Antonio Sanchez for the rape and murder of Eileen Sarmenta and Allan Gomez (1993–1995)
- Trial of Hubert Webb for the Vizconde massacre case (1995–2000)
- O. J. Simpson murder case trial (1995)
- Trial of Yolanda Saldívar (1995)
- Impeachment trial of Bill Clinton (1999)
- Bush v. Gore case that ended the recount in Florida (2000)

=== 21st century ===
- Trial of Joseph Estrada (2001–07)
- Trial of Slobodan Milošević (2002–05)
- Trial of Zvezdan Jovanović and accomplices for the assassination of Zoran Đinđić (2003–07)
- Trial of Saddam Hussein (2004–06)
- Trial of Michael Jackson (2005)
- Trial of Amanda Knox (2009)
- Trial of Ampatuan brothers for the Maguindanao massacre case (2010–2019)
- Trial of Casey Anthony for the death of Caylee Anthony (2011)
- People v. Murray (2011)
- Trial of George Zimmerman (2013)
- Trial of Bo Xilai (2013)
- Trial of Oscar Pistorius (2014)
- Trial of Joaquín Guzmán Loera ("El Chapo") (2018–19)
- Trial of Catalonia independence leaders (2019)
- Trial of Benjamin Netanyahu (2020–present)
- Trials of Donald Trump
  - First impeachment trial of Donald Trump (2020)
  - Second impeachment trial of Donald Trump (2021)
  - Prosecution of Donald Trump in New York (2024)
- Trial of Derek Chauvin (2021)
- United States v. Elizabeth A. Holmes, et al. (2021–2022)
- Depp v. Heard (2022)
- Trial of Ferdy Sambo for the murder of Nofriansyah Yosua Hutabarat (2022–2023)
- Trial of Alex Murdaugh (2023)
- Trial of Sam Bankman-Fried (2023)
- Trial of the Hong Kong 47 (2023–2024)
- Trial for the 2022–2023 Brazilian coup plot (2025)
- Trial of Sean Combs (2025)

== See also ==
- Cause célèbre
- Crime of the century
- Lists of landmark court decisions
- Media circus
- Trial by media
