= Governor of Metro Manila =

Political position in the Philippines from 1975 to 1990

- Metropolitan Manila Commission
- Style: The Honorable
- Appointer: President of the Philippines
- Formation: 1975
- First holder: Imelda Marcos
- Final holder: Elfren Cruz
- Abolished: 1990

The governor of Metropolitan Manila was a political position whose holder served as the executive head of the National Capital Region (NCR) of the Philippines, also known as Metro Manila. During its existence, the position was also known as the governor of the Metropolitan Manila Commission. The Metro Manila Commission was the central government of Metro Manila from 1975 until 1990, when it was succeeded by the Metro Manila Authority. The MMA itself was later succeeded by the Metropolitan Manila Development Authority (MMDA).

Currently, Metro Manila has no central executive head. The MMDA, headed by a chairperson, serves as an advisory body to the local government units of the National Capital Region.

== History ==
Then President Ferdinand Marcos established the Metro Manila Commission (MMC) to act as the central government of the local government units (LGUs) of the National Capital Region (NCR) or Metro Manila. The head of the commission was a governor, an appointive position rather than an elected one. Marcos appointed his wife Imelda Marcos as the MMC Governor.

Following the People Power Revolution of 1986, President Marcos was removed from his position with Corazon Aquino installed as new president. Marcos' whole family went into exile. The succeeding holders of the position of MMC Governor served in care-taker capacity as Officers-in-Charge (OIC; or Acting MMC Governors) while Aquino evaluated on the possible fate of the MMC. Aquino appointed Joey Lina as acting Governor within the year. In 1987, Lina resigned to run for senator and acting Makati Mayor Jejomar Binay was appointed in Lina's place. Binay himself later resigned from his post as Governor to run for Mayor of Makati.

Presidential Management Staff Elfren Cruz was appointed following Binay's resignation. Cruz served the post until the abolition of the MMC, consequentially the governor post itself, in 1990. The MMC was replaced by the Metro Manila Authority which would be led by one of the Mayors of Metro Manila as MMA Chairperson.

== Proposed revival ==
There are proposals since 2017 to revive the position of Governor of Metro Manila due to concerns about the limited power of the Metropolitan Manila Development Authority as a body, and its head the MMDA Chairman.

House Bill 2596 (previously 4758) titled An Act Creating The Metropolitan Manila Government was among the measures seeking to do so. The measure, authored by representative Lito Atienza of Buhay Party-List, seeks the establishment of a regional government for Metro Manila to be led by a governor elected by voters in the metropolis. The government will absorb all the powers of the MMDA, which according to Atienza is just a coordinating agency whose chairperson could be defied by Metro Manila's mayors. As per the measure the governor will be assisted by a vice governor and a regional council, where each congressional district has one representative. Then MMDA Chairman Tim Orbos also supported proposals to revive the position since the MMDA chairman has no powers to enact ordinance that would cover all LGUs of Metro Manila.

== List of governors ==
No.	Image	Name	Term		Notes
No.	Image	Name	Start	End	Notes
1		Imelda Marcos	February 27, 1975	February 25, 1986	Imelda Marcos was governor from 1975 to 1986 when she fled to Hawaii
–		Ferdinand Marcos	February 17, 1978	June 12, 1978	President Ferdinand Marcos was acting governor from February to June 1978 while Imelda ran for the Interim Batasang Pambansa
–		Joey Lina	February 25, 1986	1987	Joey Lina was acting governor (OIC) from 1986 to 1987
–		Jejomar Binay	1987	1988	Jejomar Binay was acting governor (OIC) from 1987 to 1988
–		Elfren Cruz	1988	1990	Elfren Cruz was acting governor (OIC) from 1988 to 1990
Post abolished (1990)

== See also ==
- Chairperson of the Metropolitan Manila Development Authority
- List of mayors of Metro Manila
