= Danny! discography =

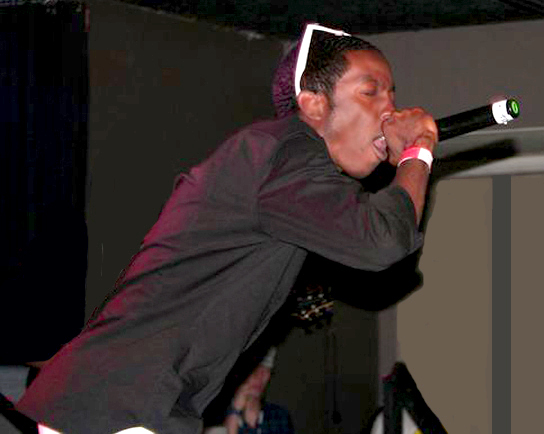
- Studio albums: 5
- Extended plays: 1
- Singles: 19
- Music videos: 1
- Instrumental albums: 3
- Compilation albums: 3

Danny!, also known as D. Swain, is an American rapper, producer and composer. In a five-year period, he has self-released twelve albums, which include five full-length albums, an EP, three instrumental albums and even a greatest hits compilation.

Though signed to Definitive Jux in early 2007, the self-proclaimed "prolific producer/MC" never released an album with the label. Instead, selected tracks from Danny!'s discography—all previously released on his vanity Badenov Records/1911 Music imprint—have been made available as a free download on Def Jux's revamped website, which boasts an extensive digital download section. A single titled "Just Friends" came out in March 2009 and is Danny!'s first, and to date only, official Def Jux release.

The artist would later sign to Interscope Records to little fanfare, in the wake of Where Is Danny?'s success in 2010. He left Interscope the following year and signed to the re-launched Okayplayer Records in 2012, releasing Payback on September 25. In 2016 he announced a new album, The Book of Daniel, but it has not been released.

== Studio albums ==
Year	Title	Peak chart positions										Notes
Year	Title	US	US R&B	US Heat.	US Ind.	US Int.	UK	GER	FRA	CAN	JAP	Notes
2004	The College Kicked-Out: Label: 1911 Music/Badenov Records (BR # 99427); Released: November 2, 2004	—	—	—	—	112	143	177	189	—	—	Debut studio album.
2005	F.O.O.D.: Label: 1911 Music/Badenov Records (BR # 62250); Released: May 17, 2005	—	—	—	—	103	129	171	152	—	91	
2006	Charm: Label: 1911 Music/Badenov Records (BR # 37468); Released: March 14, 2006	—	—	47	46	78	111	—	106	191	74	Re-released on Definitive Jux as a four-song mini-EP available as a free download.
2008	And I Love H.E.R.: Original Motion Picture Soundtrack: Label: 1911 Music/Badenov Records (BR # 38922); Released: June 24, 2008	164	—	29	38	13	62	66	98	102	33	
2009	Where Is Danny?: Label: 1911 Music/Badenov Records (BR # 38922); Released: October 13, 2009	—	—	—	—	—	—	—	—	—	—	
2012	Payback: Label: Okayplayer; Released: September 25, 2012	—	—	—	—	—	—	—	—	—	—	
"—" denotes releases that did not chart.

== Instrumental albums ==
Year	Title	Peak chart positions										Notes
Year	Title	US	US R&B	US Heat.	US Ind.	US Int.	UK	GER	FRA	CAN	JAP	Notes
2006	Dream, Interrupted: Label: 1911 Music/Badenov Records (BR # 90629); Released: August 14, 2006	—	—	—	166	121	88	—	—	—	93	First in a three-part instrumental album series.
2007	Dream, Fulfilled: Label: 1911 Music/Badenov Records (BR # 90669); Released: April 23, 2007	—	—	—	192	144	61	—	—	—	—	Re-released in the US after a UK-only initial release.
2008	Dream, Extinguished: Label: 1911 Music/Badenov Records (BR # 94292); Released: January 29, 2008	—	—	—	—	—	—	—	—	—	—	Shelved in 2008 for reasons unknown; import version officially released in 2009.
"—" denotes releases that did not chart.

== Compilation albums ==
Year	Title	Peak chart positions										Notes
Year	Title	US	US R&B	US Heat.	US Ind.	US Int.	UK	GER	FRA	CAN	JAP	Notes
2007	21st Century Masters: The Millennium Collection: The Best of Danny!: Label: 1911 Music/Badenov Records (BR # 81883); Released: August 7, 2007	—	103	43	78	46	87	—	143	—	90	
2007	Behind the Beats, Vol. 1: Label: 1911 Music/Badenov Records (BR # 51991); Released: September 11, 2007	—	—	—	—	—	—	—	—	—	111	Japan-only promotional release.
2007	Behind the Beats, Vol. 2: Label: 1911 Music/Badenov Records (BR # 51992); Released: October 23, 2007	—	—	—	—	—	—	—	—	—	114	Japan-only promotional release.
"—" denotes releases that did not chart.

== Extended plays ==
Year	Title	Peak chart positions										Notes
Year	Title	US	US R&B	US Heat.	US Ind.	US Int.	UK	GER	FRA	CAN	JAP	Notes
2007	Danny Is Dead: Label: 1911 Music/Badenov Records (BR # 51019); Released: July 17, 2007	165	111	31	76	23	80	60	71	75	35	Re-released on Definitive Jux as a three-song mini-EP available for free download.

== Music videos ==
Year	Title	Director(s)
2007	"Fly, Pt. 2"	Daniel Swain, Tim Arnold
Year	Title	Director(s)
2012	"I Don't Wanna Hear That Shit"	Tim Arnold, Skip Terpstra
Year	Title	Director(s)
2012	"Goodbye Love"	Jorge Sanchez

== Singles ==
- "I'm Movin' Out", 2004
- "My Baby", 2004
- "Second Time Around", 2004
- "I Only Wanna Be With You", 2005
- "My Whole World", 2005
- "V.I.P.", 2005
- "Fullaschidt", 2005
- "Charm", 2006
- "Strange Fruit", 2006
- "Can't Wait", 2006
- "Cafe Surreal", 2006
- "Fullaschidt (remix)", 2007
- "Check It Out", 2007
- "Fly, Pt. 2", 2007
- "The World Is Yours", 2007
- "Guess Who's Back", 2008
- "I Don't Know", 2008
- "The Groove", 2008
- "Just Friends", 2009 U.S. #88
- "I Don't Wanna Hear That Shit", 2011
- "Goodbye Love", 2012
- "Evil (feat. Gavin Castleton and Amber Tamblyn)", 2012

== Guest appearances ==
- The Bins - "Dear Jane," from Every Minute of the Day (2011)
