= Dream, Fulfilled =

Studio album by Danny!
- Released: April 23, 2007 (UK)
- Length: 59:47
- Label: Badenov Records/1911 Music
- Producer: Danny!

Danny! chronology
Dream, Interrupted (2006)	Dream, Fulfilled (2007)	Danny Is Dead (2007)

Professional ratings
Review scores
Source	Rating
Allmusic	(not yet rated)

Dream, Fulfilled is the second instrumental hip hop album by American rapper Danny!, released on April 23, 2007 under the 1911 Music/Badenov Records imprint. It is a sequel to his 2006 instrumental album Dream, Interrupted and, like its predecessor, was initially released under Danny's birth name (Daniel Swain) solely in the United Kingdom for reasons still undetermined.

The album cover, as well as the tray card and artwork contained within the liner notes, features various photographs of Ugandan youth.

== Overview ==
Dream, Fulfilled, like Dream, Interrupted before it, begins with an excerpt from "Cry Of A Dreamer" by The Sylvers. The album's tagline -- "23 years. 23 more beats. One man. One hour. One destiny."—also bears similarities to that of Dream, Interrupted. The tagline is once again misleading as "Intro" is not an instrumental, giving Dream, Fulfilled a total of 22 full-fledged beats.

Danny has long insisted that neither the song titles on his instrumental albums, nor the elapsed running times, are arbitrarily chosen and are certainly not a coincidence. As a result, theories have again been made on the reason behind the quantity of tracks and the album's playing time due to the re-use of the 23-track format. Though Danny confirmed a once-unclear theory regarding the make-up of Dream, Interrupted months after its release, it is still unknown what the 60-minute playing time on Dream, Fulfilled is meant to represent.

The "hidden" meanings behind the names chosen for instrumentals continue to be a topic of discussion in various circles, adding more mystique to both Dream, Fulfilled and its predecessor. Some song titles, such as "Ms. d'Meener" (which samples an Ahmad Jamal cover of the 1973 hit single by Foster Sylvers), are self-explanatory. Others, like "Heavenly Ham", "The Gamps", "Home...?" and "Of Shoes And Ships And Sealing-Wax", border on referential, nonsensical, and ethereal.

The release of Dream, Interrupted the previous year helped Danny successfully gain some notoriety as a talented producer aside from his tenure as an equally-skilled rapper. In celebration of both the newfound attention focused on Danny's production—and the record deal offer he received from indie label Definitive Jux only three months prior—Danny chose to continue the "dream" motif, appropriately giving the album the title Dream, Fulfilled. It was once presumed that Danny released his instrumental albums under his full name as a way to distinguish himself from Danny!, his rapping alter ego, and Daniel Swain, the aspiring producer. Danny partially confirmed this in an interview, claiming that "Danny!" was still "in retirement" during the production of the two LPs, alluding to his temporary defection from music during the latter part of 2006 and the beginning of 2007.

=== Music ===
The majority of the beats on Dream, Fulfilled are, like its predecessor, approximately two-and-a-half minutes long; however, a handful of instrumentals are significantly longer, giving the album a slightly longer playing time than Dream, Interrupted. Dream, Fulfilled marked a continuation in the departure from the sped-up soul samples Danny was first known for on his debut album The College Kicked-Out. Incorporating mixtures of bossa nova, Europop, sound library recordings and disco music helped Danny give Dream, Fulfilled a far superior album, musically, than any of his previous offerings, including his studio albums. Danny Is Dead would later feature "Check It Out (Find A Way '07)" as a full-length song with lyrics, titled "Check It Out". In 2008, "Misery" would also be revamped as a new track complete with vocals on Danny!'s critically acclaimed And I Love H.E.R.: Original Motion Picture Soundtrack.

=== Availability ===
Danny has never yet revealed the reason behind making his instrumental albums only available abroad. Dream, Fulfilled, along with Dream, Interrupted, was a UK-only release; as such, an extremely small number of copies exist in the United States (presumably due to a lack of a substantial budget, however, none of Danny's independent releases have ever been distributed in large quantities). Even in the UK only a limited number of copies have been circulated, making Dream, Interrupted and Dream, Fulfilled extremely hard to come by.

In an effort to appease fans and interested buyers, Danny eventually decided to make the record attainable in the US and offered Dream, Fulfilled for sale via iTunes and various other digital media retail stores in June 2007. Around the same time he also made his entire catalogue—whose titles were all out of print—available for sale digitally, including the once-scarce Dream, Interrupted. In contrast, the original incarnation of Dream, Fulfilled 's sequel—Dream, Extinguished—has yet to be released commercially for reasons unknown, though the Japanese version has been sold since 2009.

== Track listing ==
1. "Intro" (L. Sylvers, Swain) – 1:22
  - Produced by Daniel Swain
2. "Wait" (Eli, Daniel Swain, Barrett) – 1:25
  - Contains a sample from "Love Won't Let Me Wait" by Major Harris, from the 1975 album My Way.
  - Produced by Daniel Swain
3. "The Train" (O. Paquin, Swain) – 2:34
  - Produced by Daniel Swain
4. "Come To Me" (A. Jobim, E. Lees, Swain) – 3:18
  - Contains a sample from "Dreamer" by Astrud Gilberto, from the 1965 album The Astrud Gilberto Album.
  - Produced by Daniel Swain
5. "Games They Play" (Swain, Hawes, Simmons, Jefferson) – 2:54
  - Contains samples from "They Just Can't Stop It (Games People Play)" by The Spinners, from the 1975 album Pick of the Litter.
  - Produced by Daniel Swain
6. "No Love (On The Message Boards)" (Winbush, Chainey, Moore, Swain) – 2:12
  - Produced by Daniel Swain
  - Contains samples from "Do You Really Love Me?" by Rene & Angela, from the 1980 album Rene & Angela.
7. "In These Walls" (Bosco, Capitou, Swain) – 2:32
  - Produced by Daniel Swain
8. "The Chute" (Morrisey, Swain) – 2:33
  - Contains samples from "Fly, Fly, The Route, Shoot" by If, from the 1973 album Double Diamond.
  - Produced by Daniel Swain
9. "Meagan Good" (Stepney, Birdsong, Ayers, Swain, Booker, Henry) – 3:03
  - Contains samples from "Daylight" by RAMP, from the 1977 album Come into Knowledge & "Memory Band" by Rotary Connection, from the 1967 album of the same name.
  - Produced by Daniel Swain
10. "Heavenly Ham" (Pitts, Barnes, Swain, Lewis) – 1:25
  - Produced by Daniel Swain
  - Contains samples from "Heavenly" by Webster Lewis, from the 1980 album 8 for The Eighties.
11. "Misery" (Swain, Timoney) – 4:46
  - Contains samples from "Sau Paraiso" by Arkestra One, from the 2002 album of the same name.
  - Produced by Daniel Swain
12. "Le Pamplemousse" (Rushen, Swain) – 1:50
  - Produced by Daniel Swain
13. "Pay The Price" (Smith, Swain) – 1:34
  - Contains a sample from "Don't Make Me Pay" by Thelma Houston, from the 1977 album Any Way You Like It.
  - Produced by Daniel Swain
14. "I Just Wanna, Pt. 2" (Archer, Saadiq, Swain) – 2:50
  - Contains a sample from "Untitled (How Does It Feel)" by D'angelo, from the 2000 album Voodoo.
  - Produced by Daniel Swain
15. "The Gamps" (Sylvers, Swain) – 2:32
  - Produced by Daniel Swain
16. "Out Of Time" (Armstrong, Bell, Bendiksen, Swain) – 2:21
  - Produced by Daniel Swain
  - Contains samples from "Along The Beaches" by Lisa Bell, from the 2005 album It's All About Love.
17. "Of Shoes And Ships And Sealing-Wax" (Clarke, Swain) – 2:35
  - Produced by Daniel Swain
18. "Summer Samba" (Jobim, Swain) – 1:44
  - Contains elements from "Bolinha de Papel", by João Gilberto, Herbie Mann and Antonio Carlos Jobim.
  - Produced by Daniel Swain
19. "Ms. d'Meener" (Sylvers, Swain) – 2:38
  - Contains samples of "Misdemeanor" by Ahmad Jamal, from the 1974 album Jamaica & Misdemeanor by Foster Sylvers, from the 1973 album Foster Sylvers.
  - Produced by Daniel Swain
20. "Check It Out (Find A Way '07)" (Gilberto, Swain) – 3:49
  - Contains a sample from "Technova" by Towa Tei, from the 1995 album Future Listening!.
  - Produced by Daniel Swain
21. "The Magic Is Gone" (Lynne, Swain) – 4:04
  - Produced by Daniel Swain
  - Contains samples from "Strange Magic" by Electric Light Orchestra, from the 1975 album Face The Music.
22. "Still Got Love For You" (Caldwell, Swain) – 2:46
  - Contains a sample from "My Flame" by Bobby Caldwell, from the 1978 album What You Won't Do For Love.
  - Produced by Daniel Swain
23. "Home...?" (Gonet, Swain) – 3:00
  - Contains samples from "Red Sunset", by Michel Gonet, from the 1976 album Mondial Scoop.
  - Produced by Daniel Swain

== Personnel ==
- Daniel Swain - executive producer, producer, art direction, creative director
- Olivia Bruyere - keyboards
- Paul W. Caine - A&R
- Sinclair Devereux - bass
- Gus Jones - vibraphone
- Eric Morris - piano
- Morgan Sherman - acoustic guitar
- Audrey Vicks - strings
- Adam Zapple - synthesizer
