= Where Is Danny? =

Studio album by Danny!
- Released: April 19, 2011
- Recorded: June 2009 – September 2010
- Genre: Alternative hip-hop
- Length: 69:08
- Label: Interscope
- Producer: Danny!

Danny! chronology
And I Love H.E.R.: Original Motion Picture Soundtrack (2008)	Where Is Danny? (2011)	Payback (2012)

Where Is Danny? is the sixth studio album by American rapper and producer Danny!. It follow the rapper's 2008 album And I Love H.E.R.: Original Motion Picture Soundtrack. Where Is Danny? was originally titled Project X, but the name was changed shortly before its release. The record—marketed primarily as a lo-fi "anti-album"—is a milestone in Danny!'s career, as it is his twelfth release (amidst a vast catalog that also includes instrumental albums, compilations and an EP) yet only his first for Interscope Records after being signed to the label for a little more than half a year.

Where Is Danny? is the first album in Danny!'s discography to not feature an image of him, his likeness (à la Danny Is Dead) or even his name on the record's cover art. Instead, the album uses the artwork "Pistol" by pop artist Roy Lichtenstein. According to Swain, this was an effort to not only assert his status as an artist, but to emphasize the album's brash, "in-your-face" content. The 2011 official release used an alternate "smoking gun" variant that was previously commissioned by TIME for their 1968 cover story on the prevalence of guns in America.

Where Is Danny? would go on to receive critical acclaim, ultimately winding up—much like his previous three studio albums—on the shortlist for the following year's Grammy Awards nominees. Following a strong interest from Jay-Z in Danny! (and Questlove's inclusion of a modified version of the title track in his 2012 ad campaign for Sonos), the album enjoyed a surge of attention in late 2012 a year after its release (see 2011 in music); Danny! subsequently offered Where Is Danny? as a free download temporarily despite presence in retail. In 2025 internet rapper JPEGMafia released "Manic!", using Where Is Danny's original "Manic! At The Disco" instrumental, on the director's cut version of Scaring the Hoes.

== Overview ==
=== Conception ===
According to the Village Voice, the title Where Is Danny? is intended to serve as an allusion to the mystique surrounding both the album's frequent delays and Danny! himself, whose documented reclusive nature has raised questions on his whereabouts from fans and friends alike. Danny! would go on to clarify that the name of the album should be interpreted not only as an inquiry on his physical location, but his mental and musical one as well, of which music critic Robert Christgau has quipped "could be anywhere". The primary objective of Where Is Danny?, according to the rapper in an interview with mtvU, is to "say the most fucked-up shit" to see how much he can get away with:

"It's borderline retaliation, knowwhatI'msayin'? [laughs] Like, people will praise my [music] production...[but] when it comes to my lyrics it's always 'well, Danny! may not be the most complex rapper, but...' or 'Danny!'s beats are amazing, but his lyrics...' blah blah blah, and I've grown quite sick of it actually. This album will change all of that. I'm well-aware that people love my conceptual, story-type albums but I wanted to show that, like, I wasn't overly-reliant on that. [I wanted to] remind people 'hey, I can rap too y'know!' I only hope that I don't alienate, like, the fans who became hip after "Café Surreàl" or "Fly", but true fans will definitely appreciate it."

Danny! later reiterated the same to PopMatters, saying:

"I’m going to take everything about Danny! that is good in a different direction. A lot of the reviews don’t mention my rhyming schemes. They talk up my production but they say my lyrics aren’t as good. I put a lot of work into my rhymes. My next album is going to be similar to the minimalism of Madvillainy. I’d like to get more credit for my rhymes and talent as an emcee. Hopefully that’ll happen."

=== Development ===
In the months before its release Where Is Danny? was revealed by VIBE as being a sharp deviation from the post-Charm output that has since become Danny!'s definitive sound. In early 2009 SPIN echoed VIBE's sentiments, reiterating that the record would be less of a departure from Danny!'s musical direction but more of a return to original form, sounding "[as] over-the-top as The Slim Shady LP a decade ago".

Material from the album (namely, the first of a two-part song entitled "Sloppy Joe") was performed for the first time during an Atlanta concert with Canadian rapper Drake in May 2009. The album is intended to have an unorthodox feel, lyrically and sonically, throughout its entirety; Danny! revealed that some tracks would be a minute long, some less than that, and others as long as seven minutes. Presumably this was an effort to further distance Danny! from his previous noteworthy albeit formulaic material, bordering on blatant over-exaggeration.

The initial artwork for Where Is Danny? featured Roy Lichtenstein's "Pistol". The album's official 2011 release featured an alternate version of the same image first used by Time Magazine.

Though the record was slated for a Definitive Jux release (and later an Interscope one), Danny! would jokingly threaten to self-release the album independently, just as he did with Danny Is Dead and And I Love H.E.R., should either label begin to pull its support.

=== Postponements ===
Official release dates for Where Is Danny? have been listed as early as June 2009, but the record had yet to be shipped to retail. The record's frequent delays marks the second time in which an album title by Danny! became ironic, the first being 2006's Charm. A clean version of the album leaked to the internet in late August, but was swiftly removed. An unmastered beta version would later leak in late November. Where Is Danny?'s frequent delays caused a minor chagrin among fans and writers; an exasperated Impose Magazine questioned whether or not Danny! was still relevant despite having released an album the year before and an instrumental record in mid-2009.

In 2011 the release date for the official version of the record was announced. The release would feature only production from Danny! himself following a legal dispute between himself and the album's original producer.

== Style ==
=== Lyrical content ===
Unlike his breakthrough albums Charm and And I Love H.E.R., both of which were concept albums made to fit with an overall storyline, the lyrics on Where Is Danny? are largely random, covering a wide range of subjects. He often referenced pop culture figures, morbid events (incorporating dark humor) and sexual encounters that smack of exaggeration. Danny! also used satire on some of the song titles, paying homage to Panic! at the Disco ("Manic at the Disco"), The Beatles ("I Ain't The Walrus") and actor George Wendt.

=== Music and production ===
While production was originally handled by an unnamed former ally, the final version of Where Is Danny? was entirely produced by Danny! and contains few known samples. Much like the lyrics, the sound and production of this album differs greatly to Danny!'s other releases. After introducing a style fusing jazz and lounge music with And I Love H.E.R., Where is Danny? relied on old funk loops, big band samples, children's music and even French noir soundtracks. Many songs end abruptly with field recordings from the 1950s, crowd ambience or industrial stock effects (such as a minute-long jackhammer sequence at the end of "I Ain't The Walrus").

== Reception ==
Professional ratings
Review scores
Source	Rating
AllMusic	3/5 stars
HipHopDX	3.5/5 stars
Prefix Magazine	7.5/10 stars
RapReviews	8.5/10 stars

"Just Friends" was the first official single released from Where Is Danny? and, since Danny! was signed to Definitive Jux at the time, was offered as both a downloadable song on the label's website in March 2009 and as a featured track on the 2009 compilation disc Definitive Jux Presents: Time Travel, Vol. 1. Though "Just Friends" suffered from mixed reviews from critics and a lack of promotion, the song managed to enter the Billboard Hot 100 charts at # 88.

In contrast, the energetic "Manic at the Disco" was met with overwhelmingly positive feedback once it leaked four months after the first single. Though the song has yet to chart, it has managed to receive a considerable number of plays on HipHopDX. To date "Manic at the Disco" has been listened to over 11,000 times on the site, making it one of the most played tracks during the month of July 2009. In response to "Manic at the Disco"'s unexpected popularity, Danny! has stated that the song is far more indicative of Where Is Danny?'s overall sound than "Just Friends", and that the latter single will likely not make the album. As the tentative release date loomed closer another song, the aforementioned "Sloppy Joe, Pt. 1", was leaked by Danny! through his personal Twitter page. "Sloppy Joe, Pt. 1", its sequel and the Von Pea-featured "Hoedown Showdown" have also garnered positive reviews, further restoring interest in the oft-delayed project.

Upon its release the reception was mostly positive. Taking note of Where Is Danny?'s "anti-Top 40" aesthetic, Prefix Magazine called the album Danny!'s "gigantic middle-finger to the music industry".

== Post-release frustration and relationship with Payback ==
While noted as a courageous and critically acclaimed effort, Where Is Danny? was nonetheless largely ignored by mainstream media, due mostly to Danny!'s perpetual lack of a proper record deal and publicity team at the time, but also likely to the abrupt shift in musical direction for Danny!. When Where Is Danny? was finally given a major label release on Interscope and featured alongside Questlove in a commercial for SONOS, the momentum for the now two-year-old album had dissipated. The perceived apathy to a record he considered his "fully realized masterpiece" was Danny!'s tipping point with the industry; it was during this time he began excessively prank-calling fellow celebrities and going through a self-proclaimed "social media meltdown", alienating acts such as Childish Gambino and Busta Rhymes.

Shortly after Where Is Danny?'s re-release, Danny! began to compose what began as a vindictive satirical project to expose how much more interested in high-profile collaborations than music of substance that the industry was at the time. Danny! would spend the remainder of 2011 assembling a catalog of tracks originally intended for the Interscope digital download version of what would become Payback; most, though not all, of these tracks featured A-list artists that were unaware of Danny!'s contribution to a song. While it is uncertain which of these original songs were authorized and by what means they were acquired, it is believed that Danny! managed to compose an entire record of unwitting guest appearances according to a 2012 interview with Complex. After being completed in 2012, the original version of Payback was shelved in lieu of a partnership with Okayplayer Records, who released a modified version of the album later that year.

== Track listing ==
No.	Title	Music	Sample(s)	Length
1.	"Man, Motherfuck An Intro" (Swain)	Produced by Danny!.		0:10
2.	"Manic! at the Disco" (Swain)	Produced by Danny!.	Contains a sample of “Gönül Dağı”, by Barış Manço	2:43
3.	"Where Is Danny?" (Swain)	Produced by Danny!.	Contains a sample of "A Day In The Life", by Les DeMerle	3:56
4.	"Tattered Fedora Flow" (Swain)	Produced by Danny!.		2:06
5.	"Hoedown Showdown" (featuring Von Pea) (Callender, Swain)	Produced by Danny!.	Contains samples from "Devil's Anvil", by Eddie Warner.	2:47
6.	"I Ain't The Walrus" (Swain)	Produced by Danny!.	Contains elements from "Oh, Woman", by The Novi Singers.	3:23
7.	"Turn Me Up" (Swain)	Produced by Danny!.		1:52
8.	"Many Reasons" (Swain)	Produced by Danny!.	Contains samples from "I Love You For All Seasons", by The Fuzz.	2:23
9.	"Still Got Love" (Swain)	Produced by Danny!.	Contains a sample from "What's New", by Maria Bethânia and "Never Ever Leave Me" by Peter Jacques.	2:46
10.	"Sloppy Joe, Pt. 1" (Swain)	Produced by Danny!.	Contains samples from "Jeansy", by The Novi Singers.	1:16
11.	"Commercial Break (interlude)" (Swain)	Produced by Danny!.		2:42
12.	"Fa Fa Fa" (Swain)	Produced by Danny!.	Contains elements from "Huit Octobre 1971", by Cortex.	1:33
13.	"...And That's The Way It Is, Bub (instrumental)" (Swain)	Produced by Danny!.		5:09
14.	"Off The Hook" (featuring Che Grand) (Anosike, Swain)	Produced by Danny!.	Contains samples from "Off The Hook", by Y Pants.	2:19
15.	"George Wendt" (Swain)	Produced by Danny!.	Contains elements from "Honky Punk" by Thad Jones.	1:54
16.	"Nah, I Don't Like This Beat Yo" (Swain)	Produced by Danny!.		0:22
17.	"Theme Music To A Killing Spree" (featuring Danny Brown) (Brown, Swain)	Produced by Danny!.	Contains a sample from "Funky Spider" by Barry Stoller.	1:56
18.	"Lost One" (Swain)	Produced by Danny!.	Contains elements from "Avant de Mourir", by Serge Gainsbourg and "Lost One", by Lauryn Hill.	4:52
19.	"Scrambled Eggs" (Swain)	Produced by Danny!.		2:19
20.	"Sloppy Joe, Pt. 2" (Swain)	Produced by Danny!.	Contains samples from "Jeansy", by The Novi Singers.	2:00
21.	"Seven Seconds Of Static (interlude)" (Swain)	Produced by Danny!.		0:07
22.	"No One Can Hear You Cry" (Swain)	Produced by Danny!.	Contains elements from "Me Going To Munch You", as performed by Cookie Monster.	6:30
23.	"Wake The Fuck Up Man (You're Trippin' Man)" (Swain)	Produced by Danny!.		1:13
24.	"Good Mourning" (featuring Donwill) (Freeman, Swain)	Produced by Danny!.		5:03
25.	"Get Down" (Swain)	Produced by Danny!.	Contains samples from "Tell Her She's Lovely", by Batteaux; the original version incorporates elements from "Não Aguento Você", by Trio Esperança.	4:48
26.	"Gone Danny Gone" (Clarke, Swain)	Produced by Danny!.	Contains samples from "Run Like The Wind", by James Clarke.	2:59

Turkish Bonus Tracks
No.	Title	Music	Length
27.	"The Dozen Album Club" (Swain)	Produced by Danny!.	4:03
28.	"Racist, Corny Producers That Take Their Beats Back" (Swain)	Produced by Danny!.	0:58
29.	"Wake Up" (Swain)	Produced by Danny!.	2:41
