= Book of Daniel (disambiguation) =

The Book of Daniel is a book of the Hebrew Bible.

Book of Daniel can also refer to:

- The Book of Daniel (album), a cancelled album by American recording artist Danny!
- "Book of Daniel", a song by Danny Brown from the 2025 album Stardust
- The Book of Daniel (film), a 2013 straight-to-DVD production
- The Book of Daniel (novel), a 1971 novel by E. L. Doctorow, loosely based on the case of Julius and Ethel Rosenberg
- The Book of Daniel (TV series), a 2006 series on NBC
