= The Hoober-Bloob Highway =

1975 TV special

- VHS cover
- Genre: Animation; Comedy; Musical
- Written by: Dr. Seuss
- Directed by: Alan Zaslove
- Voices of: Bob Holt; Hal Smith
- Composer: Dean Elliott
- Country of origin: United States
- Original language: English

Production
- Executive producer: David H. DePatie
- Producers: Friz Freleng; Ted Geisel
- Running time: 24 mins.
- Production companies: The Cat in the Hat Productions; DePatie–Freleng Enterprises; CBS Productions

Original release
- Network: CBS
- Release: February 19, 1975

The Hoober-Bloob Highway is an animated musical special written by Dr. Seuss and produced by DePatie–Freleng Enterprises. The special first aired February 19, 1975 on CBS, and was the last Dr. Seuss special produced for that network. Seuss also composed the song lyrics, which were set to music by Dean Elliott.

Mr. Hoober-Bloob, a dispatcher of newborn children from some location in space, is preparing to send a new child down his highway to Earth, but first, he gives the child a chance to decide for himself whether he wants the life of a human. Mr. Hoober-Bloob shows him the realistic problems and pleasures that people face in life. The story suggests that while things may be pretty bad, there is always something to be thankful for.

== Plot ==
The titular highway is a long and winding road that leads to Earth from an area high up in space where newborn babies come from. The plot revolves around a newborn child, referred to as "Bub", as he tries to decide what he wants out of his life, or even if he wants to go at all, before being sent down the Hoober-Bloob Highway to be born.

Mr. Hoober-Bloob, with the help of a lute with arms and legs that often breaks into fast-paced solos (to the annoyance of Mr. Hoober-Bloob), explains to Bub what to expect in human life. His explanations are often accompanied by musical vignettes of Bub, depicted as a pre-adolescent boy, in an unusual situation that accompanies the song (such as being placed in front of a long and quickly scrolling tape with checkboxes on it and being expected to check the boxes quickly in the "Answer Yes or No" segment). Eventually, Bub makes the decision to depart for the world below, and Mr. Hoober-Bloob excitedly pushes his carriage down the Hoober-Bloob Highway at last.

== Cast ==
- Bob Holt as Mr. Hoober-Bloob, Snail Race Announcer
- Hal Smith as Narrator

== Credits ==
- Animation: Bob Richardson, Don Williams, Norm McCabe, Warren Batchelder, Nelson Shin, Bob Matz, Bob Bemiller, Brenda Banks, Bob Bransford, Ruth Kissane, John Freeman
- Backgrounds: Richard H. Thomas, Gloria Wood
- Layout: Dick Ung
- Sequence Director: Gerry Chiniquy
- In Charge Of Production: Lee Gunther
- Camera: John Burton, Jr., Hogan-Lee Images
- Film Editing: Rick Steward
- Music by: Dean Elliott
- Teleplay & Lyrics by: Dr. Seuss
- Production Design by: Roy Morita
- Storyboard by: Rosemary O'Connor, Chris Jenkyns
- Sound by: Producers' Sound Service Inc.
- Directed by: Alan Zaslove
- Executive Producer: David H. DePatie
- Produced by: Ted Geisel and Friz Freleng

== Reception and presentation ==
The Hoober-Bloob Highway was nominated for a Primetime Emmy, but it lost out to Yes, Virginia, There Is a Santa Claus. It, along with Pontoffel Pock, Where Are You?, is one of the least acknowledged Dr. Seuss animated specials, due to having not been a book adaptation. It was also broadcast on ABC Family's 25 Days of Christmas on December 1, 2008.

== Home media ==
The Hoober-Bloob Highway was first released on VHS by Playhouse Video in 1985, in a double feature with The Lorax). Playhouse Video also distributed it individually on VHS in 1989. A sing-along version was distributed on VHS by CBS/Fox Video in 1994, as part of a four-tape package called "Dr. Seuss Sing-Along Classics". It was also included as a bonus special on the 1998 VHS reprint of The Cat in the Hat, both the 2003 VHS and DVD releases of The Grinch Grinches the Cat in the Hat, and the 2012 Deluxe Edition Blu-ray release of The Cat in the Hat (the latter on which it was included along with Daisy-Head Mayzie). In all cases, the special was remastered from its original broadcast (in low audiovisual quality), and was not genuinely remastered until its inclusion as an extra on streaming releases of The Cat in the Hat in 2021, on which it is again paired along with Daisy-Head Mayzie. Both extras were remastered in high definition exclusively for this release.

== Soundtrack ==
The Hoober-Bloob Highway features a number of songs, centered on the decisions the newborn must make about his future life. All the lyrics are written by Dr. Seuss, all music by Dean Elliott.

- "The Hoober-Bloob Highway"
- "...And That's the Way It Is, Bub"
- "West Watch-A-Ka-Tella"
- "This Is Your Life"
- "Among the Daisies"
- "That's Just the Beginning"
- "Things You Have to Know"
- "I Know the Way You Feel, Bub"
- "On the Other Hand, Though"
- "It's Fun to be a Human"
- "What Do You Do?"
- "Answer Yes or No"
- "You're a Human""

== References in pop culture ==
The soundtrack was referenced by rapper Danny! in the track "This Is Your Life (In West Watch-A-Ka-Tella) (instrumental)" off of his album Where Is Danny?. However, the Japanese version of this record, released via Interscope Records, replaces the aforementioned track with another instrumental, "...And That's the Way It Is, Bub", also in reference to the soundtrack.
