= Just Friends (Danny! song) =

Single by Danny!

from the album Where Is Danny?
- Released: March 10, 2009
- Genre: Hip hop, downtempo
- Length: 3:08
- Label: Definitive Jux
- Songwriter: Daniel Swain
- Producer: Daniel Swain

Danny! singles chronology
"The Groove" (2008)	"Just Friends" (2009)	"Manic! At The Disco" (2009)

"Just Friends" is a song written, produced and performed by American rapper/producer Danny!. Originally a hidden track on the Japanese version of his 2007 Danny Is Dead EP, Definitive Jux Records released the live version of "Just Friends" as a single domestically on March 10, 2009 in anticipation for Where Is Danny?, his debut album for the label. A studio version was originally going to appear on the upcoming album, but was later scrapped in lieu of Where Is Danny? 's new artistic direction. To date, "Just Friends" is Danny!'s sole Def Jux release.

The song is performed over an extended version of "Twilight Mist", which was originally released on Danny!'s 2006 instrumental album Dream, Interrupted. A remix of "Wanderland" (from Danny!'s lauded And I Love H.E.R.: Original Motion Picture Soundtrack) can be found on the album's B-side. The single was released to little fanfare in the United States, barely cracking the Billboard Hot 100 in its first week at # 88, but managed to pick up steam overseas when it was shipped to the United Kingdom two weeks later. "Just Friends" was later featured as a track on the Definitive Jux compilation album Time Travel, Vol. 1.

"Just Friends"'s cover art, designed by Danny!, pays homage to the cover art found on George Masso and Ken Peplowski's collaborative jazz album, also titled Just Friends.

== Track listing ==
=== Side A ===
1. "Just Friends (live)" 3:08
2. "Just Friends (instrumental)" 3:18

=== Side B ===
1. "Wanderland (D. Swain Remix)" 4:12
2. "Wanderland (D. Swain Remix) (instrumental)" 4:12
3. "Wanderland (acapella)" 4:13

== Release history ==
Country	Date
Canada	March 10, 2009
United States	March 10, 2009
United Kingdom	March 24, 2009
