= Dream, Interrupted =

Studio album by Danny!
- Released: August 14, 2006 (UK)
- Length: 45:50
- Label: Badenov Records/1911 Music
- Producer: Danny!

Danny! chronology
Charm (2006)	Dream, Interrupted (2006)	Dream, Fulfilled (2007)

Professional ratings
Review scores
Source	Rating
Allmusic	3/5 stars

Dream, Interrupted is an instrumental hip hop album by American rapper/producer Danny!, and the fourth release under Danny's personal 1911 Music/Badenov Records imprint. Dream, Interrupted was released exclusively in the United Kingdom (under Danny's birth name, Daniel Swain) on August 14, 2006 (see 2006 in music) prior to seeing a stateside release the following year.

== Overview ==
Prior to the release of Dream, Interrupted, Danny had released three studio albums (The College Kicked-Out, F.O.O.D. and Charm) that showcased both his rapping and his production skills; Dream, Interrupted helped shift the spotlight solely on Danny's production. Presumably, the record was released under Danny's full name in an effort to distinguish himself from Danny!, his rapping alter ego.

The title itself is an allusion to Danny's well-publicized 2006 "retirement" in which he decided to briefly discontinue, or "interrupt", his long-time goal, or "dream", of hitting it big in the music industry. With the success of his third studio album Charm and his subsequent signing to Definitive Jux Records for an EP and music video, Danny has since released a sequel to Dream, Interrupted, aptly titled Dream, Fulfilled.

Dream, Interrupted opens and closes with, appropriately, portions of The Sylvers' "Cry Of A Dreamer". Excerpts from a Marvin Gaye interview are placed within the clips. The album's tagline, "23 years. 23 beats. 46 minutes. You do the math." helped listeners grasp the reason for Danny's choice of quantity of tracks and the overall length of the album (though the tagline is erroneous, as both the "Intro" and "Outro" aren't instrumentals at all, making the album comprise only 21 beats). The most common theory regarding Dream, Interrupted's format is that the number "23" was meant to represent the age of both Danny! the rapper and Daniel Swain the producer at the time of its release; the sum of 23 and 23, of course, is 46. This was later confirmed during an interview.

The instrumental titles contain either subtle references to events in Danny's career, ethereal connotations or utter nonsense. The "hidden" meanings behind song titles have been debated on several hip-hop message boards.

=== Music ===
With many of the tracks clocking in at just over two minutes long, the concise exploration of various tracks made Dream, Interrupted very similar in style to J Dilla's Donuts, another instrumental album lauded in 2006 with an underlying theme and track titles containing seemingly subtle meanings.

Musically, Dream, Interrupted picks up where Charm left off, with the album balancing a sophisticated yet very distinctly upbeat sound with a somber undertone. Over the course of the past few years Danny's production style has evolved from sped-up, "chopped" soul samples typical of most of his contemporaries to more ambient, jazz-infused offerings that seem to be a hybrid of drum & bass, bossa nova and electronica. This could be attributed to his recent experimentation with sampling songs from out-of-print foreign film soundtracks, specifically from France, Italy and Japan, as well as sound library records from England. Thus, Danny's musical "evolution" is first documented here on such songs as "Listen", "Twilight Mist" and "Sea of Tomorrow". Occasionally, however, Danny will revert to the sound he first introduced on his earlier work; examples on Dream, Interrupted include "I'm Not Ready", "This Time Around" and "Salon Des Refuses".

=== Availability ===
For reasons still unknown, Dream, Interrupted was initially released in compact disc format in various parts of the United Kingdom. As a result, very few copies exist in the US and only a handful of music editors have ever even seen the actual record stateside. However, all of Danny's independent releases have been distributed in limited quantities, presumably due to a lack of a substantial budget.

The scarcity of the record in the UK, the virtual nonexistence of copies in the United States, and the meager promotion of the album overall made Dream, Interrupted one of Danny's most mysterious and sought-after projects in late 2006, until it was re-released digitally the following year. For a while following its initial release little else was known about the album outside of its promotional tagline and the occasional interview that Danny would mention it in, when prompted. In 2008 Danny's third instrumental album Dream, Extinguished would significantly eclipse the amount of scantiness and subsequent infringement of Dream, Interrupted due to its abrupt cancellation. Dream, Interrupted's lack of publicity was a sharp contrast to the ubiquity of Charm, released precisely five months prior.

== Track listing ==
1. "Intro" – 1:47
  - Contains a sample from "Cry Of A Dreamer" by The Sylvers, from the 1973 album The Sylvers 2.
  - Produced by Daniel Swain
2. "Sky's The Limit" – 1:50
  - Contains a sample from "Moře Klidu" by Mahagon, from the 1978 album Mahagon.
  - Produced by Daniel Swain
3. "Can't Let It Go" – 1:43
  - Contains a sample from "Portuguese Love" by Teena Marie, from the 1981 album It Must Be Magic.
  - Produced by Daniel Swain
4. "You're On My Mind" – 1:38
  - Contains a sample from "All I Want" by Hiroshima, from the 1980 album Odori.
  - Produced by Daniel Swain
5. "Salon Des Refuses" – 1:24
  - Produced by Daniel Swain
6. "Love (Is What You Make It)" – 1:46
  - Contains a sample from "Time Is Love", by Black Ivory, from the 1972 album, Baby Won't You Change Your Mind.
  - Produced by Daniel Swain
7. "Loss For Words" – 1:50
  - Produced by Daniel Swain
  - Contains a samples from "Humpy Dump", by The Vibrettes, from the 1973 album of the same name & "Lost Inside of you", by Al Hudson & the Soul Partners, from the 1978 album Spreading Love.
8. "Jaded" – 2:00
  - Contains a sample from "Superstar", by Bette Midler, from the 1972 album, The Divine Miss M.
  - Produced by Daniel Swain
9. "Same Song" – 1:50
  - Contains a sample from "City of Angels" by The Miracles, from the 1975 album of the same name.
  - Produced by Daniel Swain
10. "Stardust" – 1:32
  - Produced by Daniel Swain
11. "Dream On" – 1:18
  - Produced by Daniel Swain
  - Contains samples from "Amanda" by Dionne Warwick, from the 1971 album The Love Machine.
12. "Twilight Mist" – 2:18
  - Produced by Daniel Swain
13. "Child of the Night" – 1:48
  - Contains a sample from "If Your Heart Isn't In It" by Atlantic Starr, from the 1986 album As The Band Turns.
  - Produced by Daniel Swain
14. "Best Of Me" – 2:59
  - Produced by Daniel Swain
15. "Diggin' On You" – 2:07
  - Contains samples from "Questions" by Carrie Lucas, from the 1978 album Street Corner Symphony.
  - Produced by Daniel Swain
16. "I'm Not Ready" – 2:53
  - Contains samples from "Stay with Me" by Cherrelle, from the 1984 album Fragile.
  - Produced by Daniel Swain
17. "Born To Wander ('Til I'm Dead)" – 1:51
  - Contains samples from "Never Will I Merry" by Nancy Wilson & Cannonball Adderley, from the 1961 album Nancy Wilson/Cannonball Adderley.
  - Produced by Daniel Swain
18. "Passion Fruit" – 1:33
  - Produced by Daniel Swain
19. "This Time Around" – 1:52
  - Contains a sample from "Didn't We" by Thelma Houston, from the 1969 album Sunshower.
  - Produced by Daniel Swain
20. "Listen" – 3:40
  - Produced by Daniel Swain
21. "Sea of Tomorrow" – 2:36
  - Produced by Daniel Swain
22. "Outro" – 1:17
  - Produced by Daniel Swain
23. "Just A Dream...?" – 2:18
  - Contains samples from "Doing It My Way", by Bobby Womack, from the 1974 album Looking For A Love Again.
  - Produced by Daniel Swain

== Credits ==
- Daniel Swain - Executive Producer, Producer, Composer
- Danny! - Art Direction, Creative Director
- Ezra Alexander - A&R
- Gus Jones - Vibraphone
- Olivia Bruyere - Keyboards
- Linus Pomeroy - Keyboards
- Genevieve De Lorme - Bass
- Sinclair Devereux - Bass
- Morgan Sherman - Guitar
