= Brenda Banks (animator) =

American animator (1948–2020)

Brenda Lee Banks

Brenda Lee Banks (July 19, 1948 – December 30, 2020) was an American animator, who was one of the first African American women to work as a professional animator.

== History ==
=== Early life and education ===
Banks was born in Los Angeles on July 19, 1948. She graduated from Fremont High School in 1967 and later attended the California Institute of the Arts. She continued her education at CalArts through 1977 while simultaneously beginning her professional career in animation. Her work was a major step forward for the field, which historically didn't have much racial diversity.

=== Career ===
Banks's first projects included the Clerow Wilson television specials in the early 1970s and the 1973 animated special B.C.: The First Thanksgiving. Later that year, she joined Ralph Bakshi’s studio; despite having no prior background in animation, she was hired after asking for a job, according to Ralph Bakshi.

Banks was initially given minor tasks on the 1974 feature Coonskin. After proving her technical abilities, she was assigned to animate "goon" characters in the film Wizards. Although these were secondary characters, her work was a success, and Bakshi described her as the "star of the goons" at the studio. She continued to work on Bakshi’s subsequent features including The Lord of the Rings in 1978 and Fire and Ice in 1983.

Following her work with Bakshi, Banks joined Warner Brothers Animation to work on their Looney Tunes television specials. She later held roles at Hanna-Barbera, where she worked on The Pirates of Dark Water, and at Film Roman, where she contributed to the Fox series The Simpsons. In the latter half of her career, she specialized in character layout, focusing on scene composition and how shots were arranged visually. From 1997 to 2005, she served as a layout artist for King of the Hill, before retiring from the industry.

== Accolades and awards ==
In 2018, Banks was honored with the Women in Animation (WIA) Diversity Award during the Spark Animation Festival. Taylor Shaw, a founder of Black Women Animate, accepted the award on her behalf, describing her as a "pioneer who deserves this honor" and a "symbol of perseverance" for women of color. The award, presented by the WIA non-profit organization, recognized her contributions to the industry and her role in "paving the way for future generations" of diverse artists.

== Personal life ==
Banks was known by her colleagues as a private individual who preferred to focus on her craft rather than her status. According to fellow animator Lee Crowe, Banks was modest regarding her achievements and did not seek recognition for being one of the first African American women in animation. Early in her career, Banks worked despite a physical disability that required her to use leg braces, though her mobility later improved following surgery.

Banks died on December 30, 2020, at the age of 72.

== Filmography ==
=== Feature Films ===
- 1974 Coonskin (animator - uncredited)
- 1977 Wizards (animator)
- 1978 The Lord of the Rings (key animator)
- 1981 American Pop (animator)
- 1982 Hey Good Lookin' (animator)
- 1983 Fire and Ice (animator)
- 1983 Daffy Duck's Movie: Fantastic Island (animator: bridging sequences)
- 1988 Daffy Duck's Quackbusters (animator)
- 1990 Jetsons: The Movie (animator)
- 1993 Once Upon a Forest (animator)
- 1994 The Pagemaster (additional character animator)

=== Television ===
- 1972 Clerow Wilson and the Miracle of P.S. 14 (TV Movie) (animator)
- 1973 B.C.: The First Thanksgiving (TV Special short) (assistant animator)
- 1974 Clerow Wilson's Great Escape (TV Movie) (animator - as Brenda Lee Banks)
- 1974 ABC Afterschool Specials (TV Series) (animator - 1 episode)
- 1975 The Hoober-Bloob Highway (TV Movie) (animator)
- 1980 Pontoffel Pock and His Magic Piano (TV Movie) (animator)
- 1980 Heathcliff (TV Series) (animator - 1980)
- 1984–1985 The Smurfs (TV Series) (animator - 50 episodes)
- 1985 The 13 Ghosts of Scooby-Doo (TV Mini-Series) (animator - 13 episodes)
- 1985–1986 Paw Paws (TV Series) (animator - 18 episodes)
- 1988 The Night of the Living Duck (Short) (animator - as Brenda L. Banks)
- 1988 Bugs vs. Daffy: Battle of the Music Video Stars (TV Special short) (animator)
- 1989 This Is America, Charlie Brown (TV Mini-Series) (animator - 1 episode)
- 1989 Bugs Bunny's Wild World of Sports (TV Movie) (animator)
- 1990 Tiny Toon Adventures (TV Series short) (animator - 1 episode)
- 1990 Midnight Patrol: Adventures in the Dream Zone (TV Series) (animator - 13 episodes)
- 1990 Gravedale High (TV Series) (animator - 13 episodes)
- 1990 Bill & Ted's Excellent Adventures (TV Series) (animator - 13 episodes)
- 1991 The Pirates of Dark Water (TV Series) (animator - 2 episodes)
- 1990–1991 The Adventures of Don Coyote and Sancho Panda (TV Series short) (animator - 26 episodes)
- 1990–1993 Tom & Jerry Kids (TV Series) (animator - 2 episodes)
- 1998 The Simpsons (TV Series) (character layout artist - 2 episodes)
- 1997–2006 King of the Hill (TV Series) (character layout artist - 28 episodes, 1997–2003) (animation layout artist - 12 episodes, 2002–2006) (layout artist - 2 episodes, 2003–2005)

=== Video Games ===
- 1997 The Simpsons: Virtual Springfield (Video Game) (animator) / (traditional animator)
