= And I Love H.E.R.: Original Motion Picture Soundtrack =

Studio album by Danny!
- Released: June 24, 2008
- Length: 1:11:22
- Label: Badenov Records/1911 Music
- Producer: Danny!

Danny! chronology
Dream, Extinguished (2008)	And I Love H.E.R.: Original Motion Picture Soundtrack (2008)	Where Is Danny? (2011)

And I Love H.E.R.: Original Motion Picture Soundtrack, also referred to as simply And I Love H.E.R., is MC/producer Danny!'s full-length follow-up to 2006's Charm and the second in a series of concept albums (succeeded by 2012's Payback). The record was released to universal acclaim, cited by ABC News and L.A. Weekly as one of the best releases of 2008 (see 2008 in music). And I Love H.E.R. was expected to be released on January 22, but was postponed until June 24 for various reasons. Around the time of its original projected release date a promotional poster surfaced on URB Magazine's website, revealing Tanya Morgan's Von Pea, Brooklyn MC Che Grand and Kidz in the Hall's Naledge as the "film"'s "co-stars".

And I Love H.E.R. was notable for introducing yet another musical direction for Danny!, who was experimenting with hip house, downtempo and electronica during the record's inception to produce a sort of "lounge-hop" hybrid that has since become his definitive style. Tracks such as "Not The One", "At What Price" and "Do You" were cited by critics as stand-out songs and are examples of Danny!'s new sound.

== Overview ==
Originally assumed to be Danny!'s debut release under new recording home Definitive Jux Records, it appears as if And I Love H.E.R. is, like Danny Is Dead before it, yet another independent release, making the album Danny!'s fifth studio album and eleventh release under his vanity 1911 Music/Badenov Records imprint. It is unknown why the album, nor its successor Where Is Danny?, was not an official Def Jux release, considering that Danny! had not yet released an album through the label nor publicly defected from them at the time. As such, much speculation has risen regarding the release of this album.

Contrary to the album's subtitle, And I Love H.E.R. is not actually a "soundtrack" but rather a concept album chronicling the story of Danny!'s love affair with hip-hop music. Both And I Love H.E.R.'s title and cover art was inspired by the Beatles' 1964 feature film A Hard Day's Night, with "And I Love Her" being one of the signature songs from the film's soundtrack. Other songs, such as "I Want H.E.R. (She's So Heavy)" and "Yoko Ono", also make reference to the Beatles. Meanwhile, the usage of "H.E.R." as an acronym is an allusion to "I Used to Love H.E.R." by fellow rapper Common, the 1994 song which personified hip-hop as a woman and former love interest.

=== Reception ===
Professional ratings
Review scores
Source	Rating
ABC News	favorable
Allmusic	4/5 stars
Cokemachineglow	(74/100)
Okayplayer	4/5 stars
Performer Magazine	favorable
Pitchfork	(7.3/10)
RapReviews	9/10 stars

And I Love H.E.R. was met with generally positive reviews, ultimately earning an 81% rating from review aggregator Metacritic. Pitchfork described the record as an "engaging, thoroughly promising album", citing the song "Wanderland" as And I Love H.E.R.'s "most compelling moment" and "The Groove" as having an aesthetic similar to André 3000's "Hey Ya!". And I Love H.E.R. also received praises from Allmusic, Okayplayer, and Performer Magazine, who featured Danny! on its front cover only months prior. The record was met with year-end recognition toward 2008's closing, landing on numerous "best of" lists compiled by ABC News, Coke Machine Glow and Allmusic.

== Track listing ==
No.	Title	Music	Sample(s)	Length
1.	"Intro" (Swain, Bembo)	Produced by Danny!	Contains elements from "Got To Be There", by Michael Jackson.	5:17
2.	"Guess Who's Back" (featuring Naledge) (Swain, Evans, Jacques)	Produced by Danny!		3:14
3.	"I Want H.E.R. (She's So Heavy)" (featuring Brittany Bosco) (Goose, Swain, Benjamin, Ohno)		Contains lyrics from "Prototype", by André 3000 of Outkast and "Electric Relaxation" by A Tribe Called Quest. Contains elements from "Rapper Dapper Snapper", by Edwin Birdsong.	5:06
4.	"At What Price" (featuring Maria) (Swain, Kawata))	Produced by Danny!		6:57
5.	"Jet Set" (Swain, Guaraldi)	Produced by Danny!		3:20
6.	"The Groove" (Swain, Nilovic)	Produced by Danny!		4:57
7.	"Not The One" (featuring Kid Syc) (Swain, Harold, Dragazis)	Produced by Danny!	Contains lyrics from "She Said", by The Pharcyde. Contains elements from "Tom's Diner", by Suzanne Vega.	3:44
8.	"Misery" (featuring Collette) (Swain, Miranda, Timoney)	Produced by Danny!		4:47
9.	"Intermission (interlude)" (Swain, Softley)	Produced by Danny!	Contains samples from "Moonstone", by Gringo.	4:09
10.	"Wanderland" (Swain, Goose, Brown, Byrd)		Contains elements from "Mysterious Vibes", by the Blackbyrds.	4:21
11.	"Where You Goin'" (featuring Maria) (Swain, Kawata)	Produced by Danny!		3:27
12.	"Never Change" (featuring Kid Syc and Branden M. Collins) (Swain, Goose, Harold, Bembo)		Contains samples from "Tema Di Barbara", by Alberto Baldan Bembo.	4:05
13.	"I Don't Know" (featuring Von Pea and Stephanie Mae) (Swain, Callender, Pettaway, Job)	Produced by Danny!	Contains elements from "Make It Right", by Marz.	2:49
14.	"Yoko Ono" (featuring Che Grand) (Swain, Anosike, Berger)	Produced by Danny!	Contains samples from "Zoïzoï", by France Gall.	3:49
15.	"Do You" (Swain, Hukkelberg)	Produced by Danny!		3:00
16.	"After The Love Has Gone" (Swain, Dale, Richardson)	Produced by Danny!	Contains elements from "Brass But Lightly", by Neil Richardson and Syd Dale.	4:00
17.	"Keep Dreamin'" (Swain, Garnegy, Maties)	Produced by Danny!		4:20
Total length:				1:11:22

Japan Bonus Tracks
No.	Title	Music	Length
18.	"Media Darling" (Goose, Swain)	Produced by Alex Goose	3:04
Total length:			1:14:26

== Release history ==
Country	Date
United Kingdom	June 23, 2008
United States	June 24, 2008
Japan	July 21, 2008
