= List of Sony Music Publishing artists =

This is a list of songwriters, artists and bands published by Sony Music Publishing.

== 0–9 ==
- 7 Aurelius
- 40 Below Summer
- 50 Cent

== A ==
- A1
- Acceptance
- Afrika Bambaataa
- Akon
- Alex Cartañá
- Alison Clarkson
- Amen
- Andrea Martin
- Andy Bell
- Angie Stone
- Ant & Dec
- Anthony Rossomando
- Architecture in Helsinki
- Armand Van Helden
- AronChupa
- Atomic Kitten

== B ==
- B2K
- Babyface
- Backstreet Boys
- Baha Men
- Ball Park Music
- Band of Skulls
- Band Ohne Namen
- Beck
- Beenie Man
- Belle & Sebastian
- Bernadette Nolan
- Beverley Knight
- BigXthaPlug
- Billy Bragg
- Billy Crawford
- Billy Mann
- Billy Ocean
- Björk
- The Black Eyed Peas
- Blazin' Squad
- Blondie
- Blue
- Bob Dylan
- Bob Luman
- BodyRockers
- Bomfunk MC's
- Bon Jovi
- Boy Kill Boy
- Boyz II Men
- Brenda Lee
- Brian Harvey
- Brian Kennedy
- Brian West
- Brick & Lace
- Bright Eyes
- Brooks & Dunn
- Bruce Springsteen
- Bryan Adams
- BTS
- Bush
- Busted

== C ==
- Cardi B
- Carin Leon
- Carlos McKinney
- Cartel
- Cassidy
- Catatonia
- Cathy Dennis
- Cedric Gervais
- Celine Dion
- Chantal Kreviazuk
- Charlie Pride
- Charlie Sexton
- Charlotte Sometimes
- Cher
- Cherry Ghost
- Cheyenne Kimball
- Chico Bennett
- Chink Santana
- Chris Braide
- Chris Cornell
- Chucky Thompson
- Claudette Ortiz
- Clean Bandit
- Clinic
- Colby O'Donis
- Collective Soul
- Conor Oberst and the Mystic Valley Band
- Conway Twitty
- Corinne Bailey Rae
- Crossfade
- Cubeatz
- Cyndi Lauper

== D ==
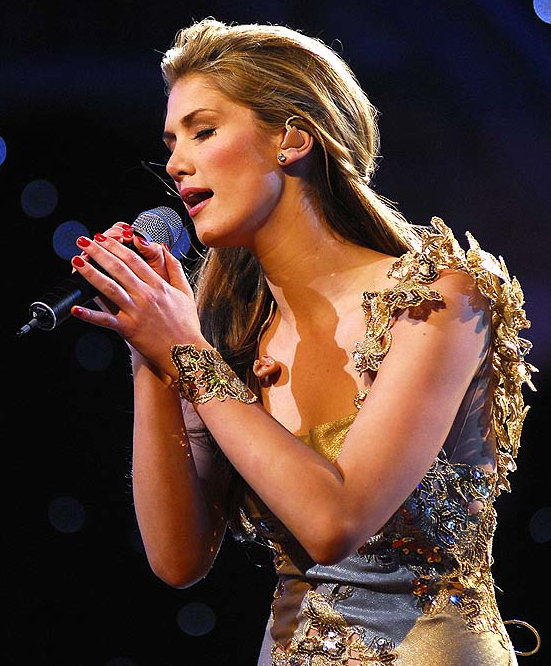
Delta Goodrem

- Daniel Bedingfield
- Daniel Powter
- Dannii Minogue
- Danny!
- Darrell Scott
- Darren Hayes
- Dave Grusin
- Dave Tozer
- David Crosby
- Def Leppard
- Delerium
- Delta Goodrem
- Des'ree
- Destiny's Child
- Die Antwoord
- Distant Soundz
- Dixie Chicks
- DJ Mustard
- DJ Snake
- Dolly Parton
- Don Gibson
- Donny Osmond
- Donovan
- Doves
- Duke Ellington

== E ==
- Ed Sheeran
- Eg White
- Electric Six
- Ella Mai
- Elliott Yamin
- Elvis Presley
- Embrace
- Emma Bunton
- Eminem
- Engelbert Humperdinck
- Enya
- Erasure
- Estelle

== F ==
- Fabolous
- Faith Hill
- Fall Out Boy
- Fetty Wap
- Five
- Five Finger Death Punch
- Flight of the Conchords
- Flo Rida
- Flobots
- Fran Healy
- Freestylers

== G ==
- Gabrielle
- Gareth Gates
- Gary Barlow
- Gary Powell
- Gemma Fox
- George Michael
- George Strait
- Geri Halliwell
- Girls Aloud
- Glassjaw
- Goldie Lookin Chain
- Gorillaz
- Grace VanderWaal
- Graham Nash
- Greg Laswell
- Gretchen Wilson
- GS Boyz
- Gwen Stefani

== H ==
- H & Claire
- Hank Williams
- Hear’Say
- Hilary Duff
- Hockey
- Hope of the States
- Hundred Reasons

== I ==
- Ian Brown
- Il Divo
- India.Arie
- Irv Gotti

== J ==
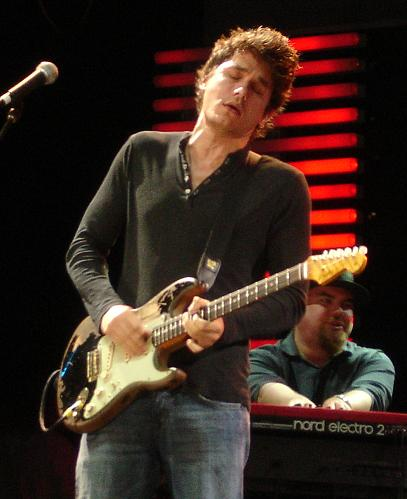
John Mayer

- Jack Antonoff
- Jam & Spoon
- James Brown
- James Morrison
- Jason Nevins
- Jason Wade
- Jay Sean
- Jeff Buckley
- Jeff Carson
- Jennifer Lopez
- Jerry Wallace
- Jesse Harris
- Jessica Simpson
- Jessie Baylin
- Jet
- Jimi Hendrix
- Joe Diffie
- Joe Jackson
- Joe Strummer
- Joe Tex
- Joe Walsh
- Joey Purp
- John Legend
- John Mayer
- Johntá Austin
- Jonas Brothers
- Joni Mitchell
- Joss Stone
- Junior Jack

== K ==
- Kaci
- Kameron Marlowe
- Kasabian
- Katie Melua
- Kate Bush
- Kelly Rowland
- King Princess
- Kish Mauve
- K'naan
- Kraftwerk
- KT Tunstall
- Kylie Minogue
- KSI
- Kid Soul

== L ==
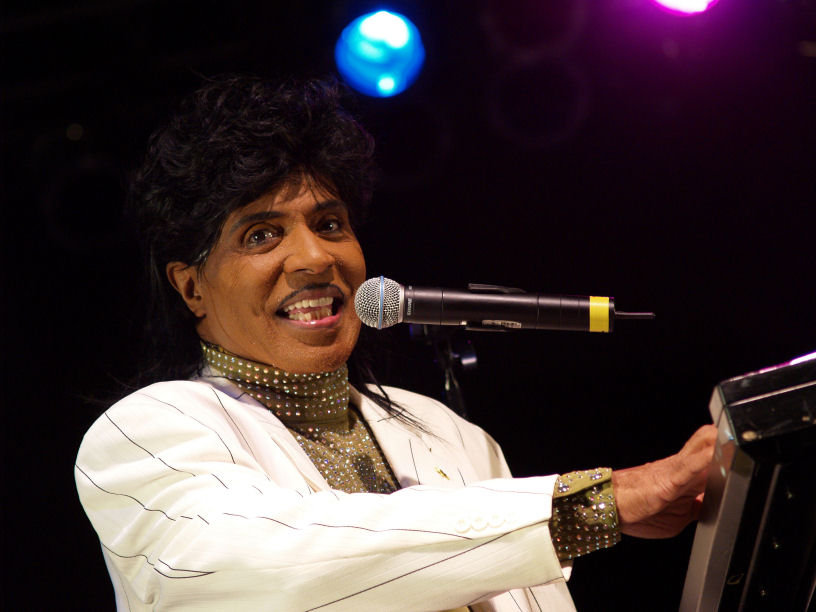
Little Richard

- Lady Gaga
- Lamb of God
- Las Ketchup
- Lauryn Hill
- LeAnn Rimes
- Lee Greenwood
- Lemar
- Lemon Jelly
- Lenka
- Leonard Cohen
- Liberty X
- Lil' Kim
- Linda Perry
- Linkin Park
- Little Richard
- Liz Phair
- LL Cool J
- Louis Biancaniello

== M ==
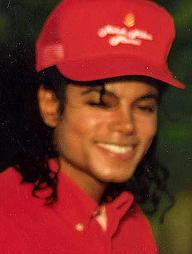
Michael Jackson (and his estate after June 25, 2009) owned half of Sony/ATV Music Publishing between 1995 and 2016.

- Maluma
- Måneskin
- Manic Street Preachers
- Marc Anthony
- Marc Nelson
- Mark Ronson
- Mario
- Mark Owen
- Mary J. Blige
- Maxwell
- MC Lyte
- Melanie Brown
- Mercury Rev
- Merle Haggard
- Michael Jackson (2012–present)
- Mike Mangini
- Miles Davis
- Mims
- Miniature Tigers
- Mint Royale
- Mis-Teeq
- Modest Mouse
- Modjo
- Mungo Jerry

== N ==
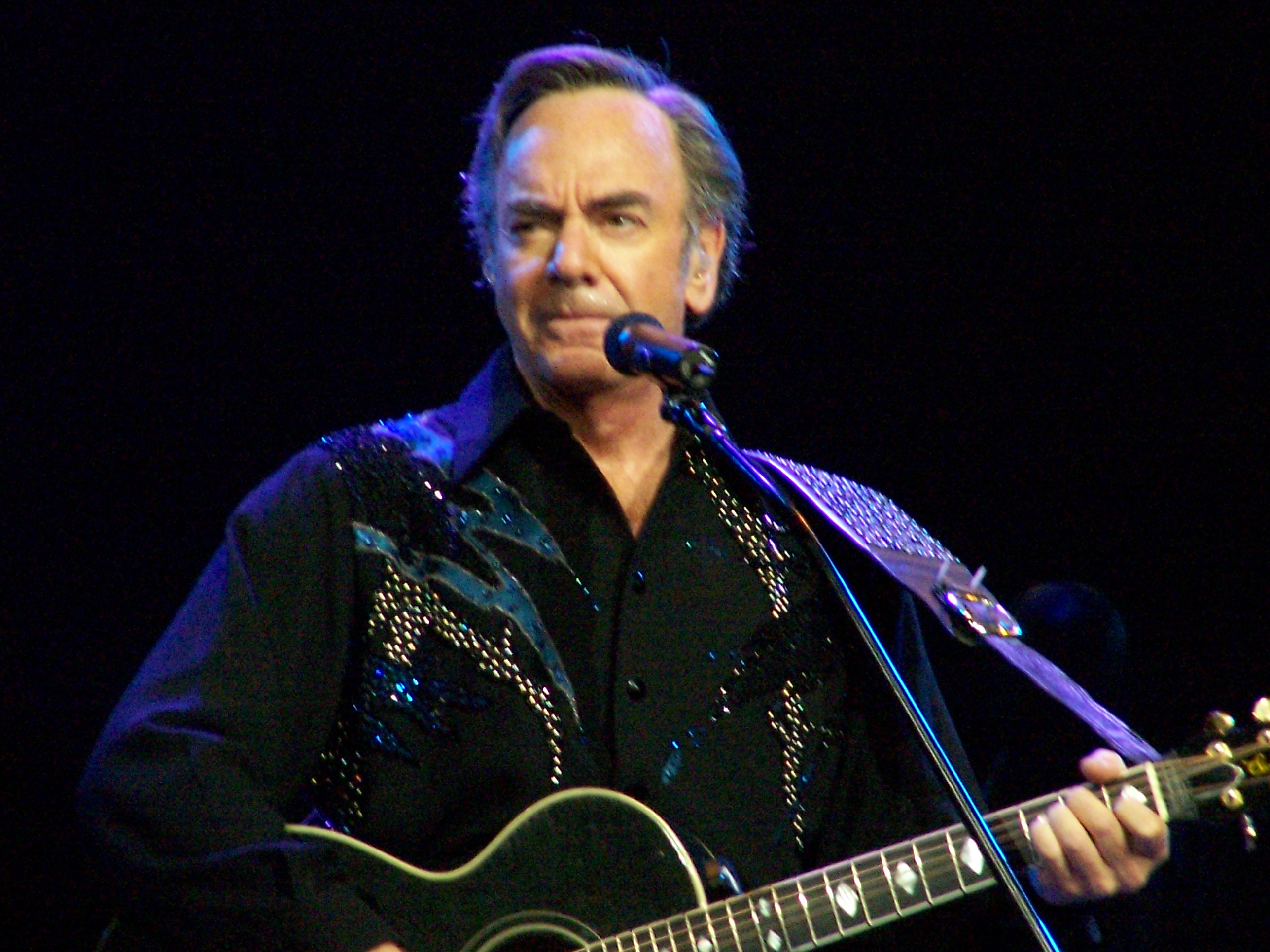
Neil Diamond

- Narcotic Thrust
- Natasha Bedingfield
- Ne-Yo
- Neal McCoy
- Neil Diamond
- Nelly Furtado
- Nikki Flores
- Nikki Jean
- Nile Rodgers
- Nodesha
- Norah Jones

== O ==
- Oasis
- Olivia
- Olivia Rodrigo
- OneRepublic
- Orbital
- Otis Redding
- Ozomatli

== P ==
- Patsy Cline
- Paul Simon
- Pet Shop Boys
- Peter Cincotti
- Petula Clark
- Pharrell Williams
- Phats & Small
- Pink
- Plummet
- Psy

== Q ==
- Queen (from EMI Music Publishing)
- Queens of the Stone Age

== R ==
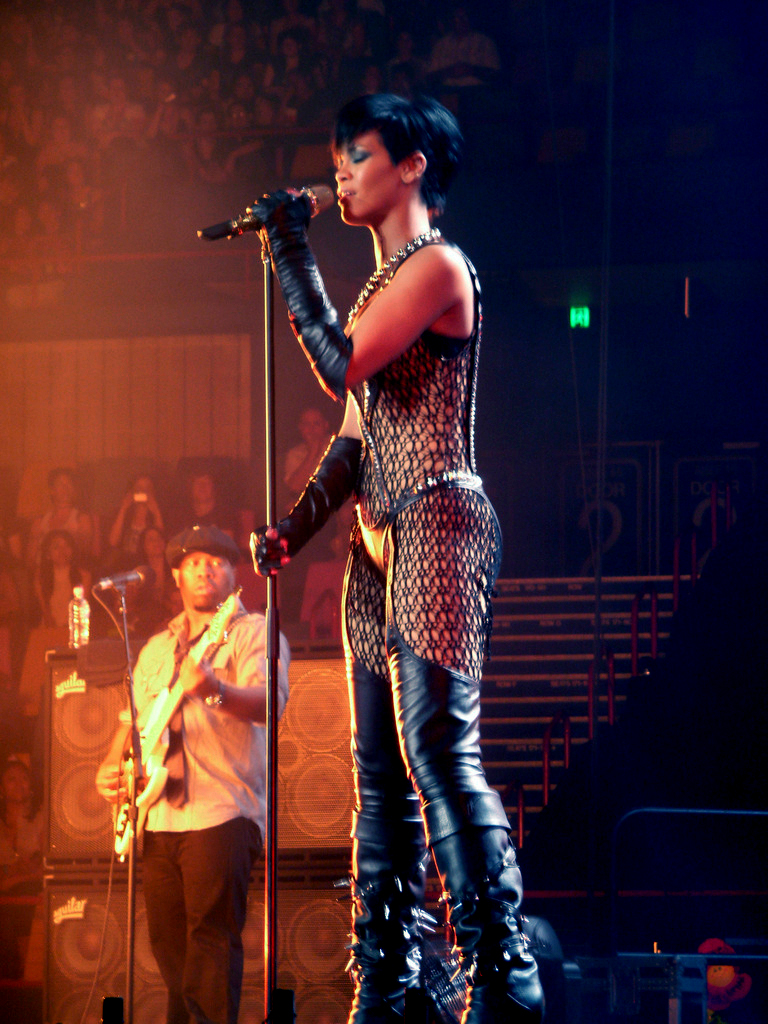
Rihanna

- R. Kelly
- Razorlight
- Raynes (band)
- Reba McEntire
- Red
- Reef
- Richie Sambora
- Rick Ross
- Ricky Martin
- Rihanna
- Rise Against
- Rishi Rich
- Robert Palmer
- Robert Plant
- Roger Miller
- Rolling Stones
- Ronan Keating
- Roy Acuff
- Roy Orbison
- Ryan Adams

== S ==
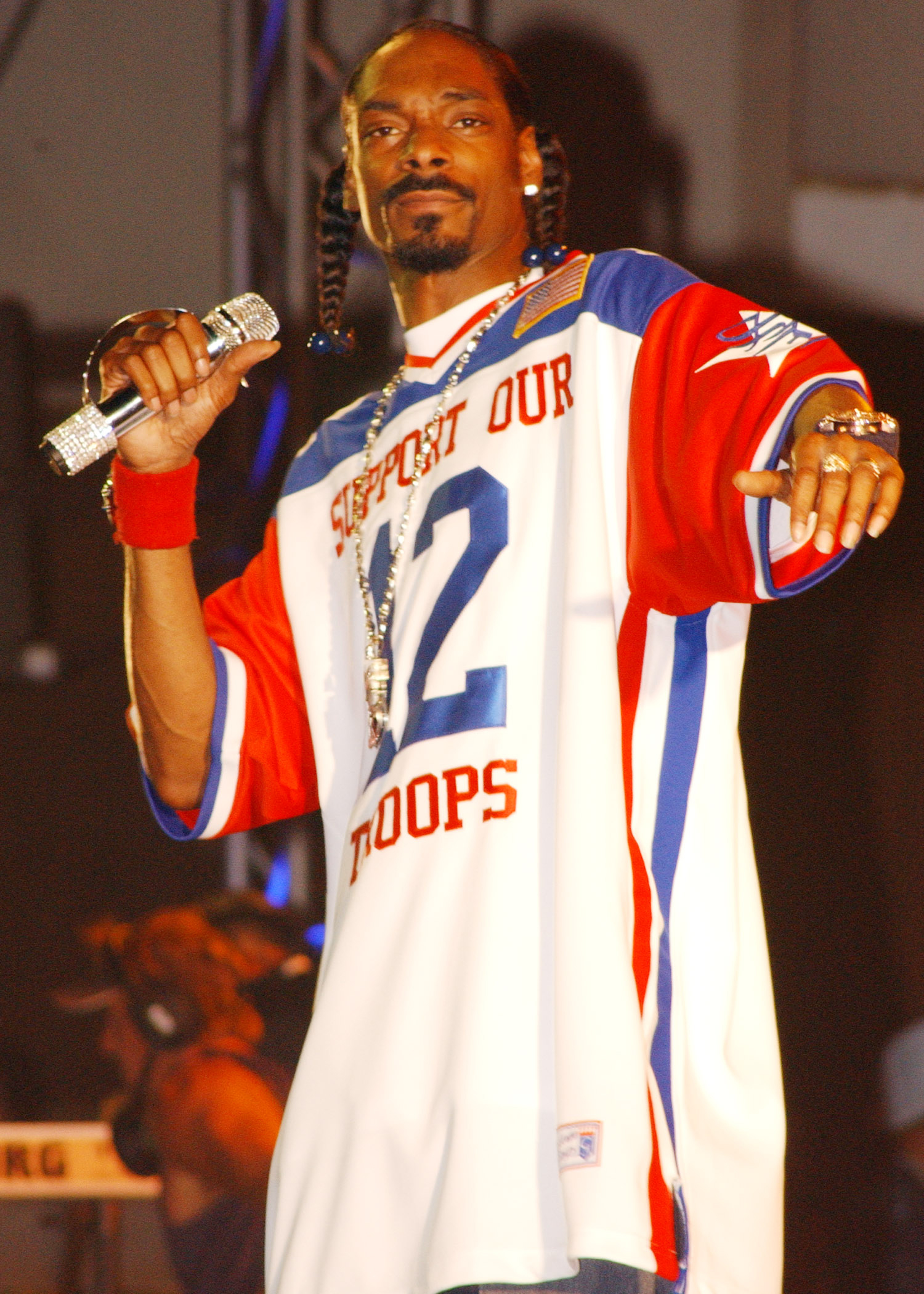
Snoop Dogg

- S Club 7
- S Club Juniors
- Sade
- Safri Duo
- Saigon
- Sam & Mark
- Sam Smith
- Samantha Mumba
- Santana
- Sara Bareilles
- Sarah McLachlan
- Sarah Whatmore
- Sasha Dobson
- Scars on Broadway
- Scooch
- Scooter
- Sean Kingston
- Secondhand Serenade
- Shakira
- Shapeshifters
- She Wants Revenge
- Sia
- Simon Webbe
- Simple Kid
- Slade
- Snoop Dogg
- Souad Massi
- Sound the Alarm
- Speedway
- Spiller
- State of Shock
- Stephen Gately
- Stephen Stills
- Stevie Nicks
- Sue Thompson
- Suede
- Sugababes
- Sweetie Irie
- System Of A Down
- Systematic

== T ==
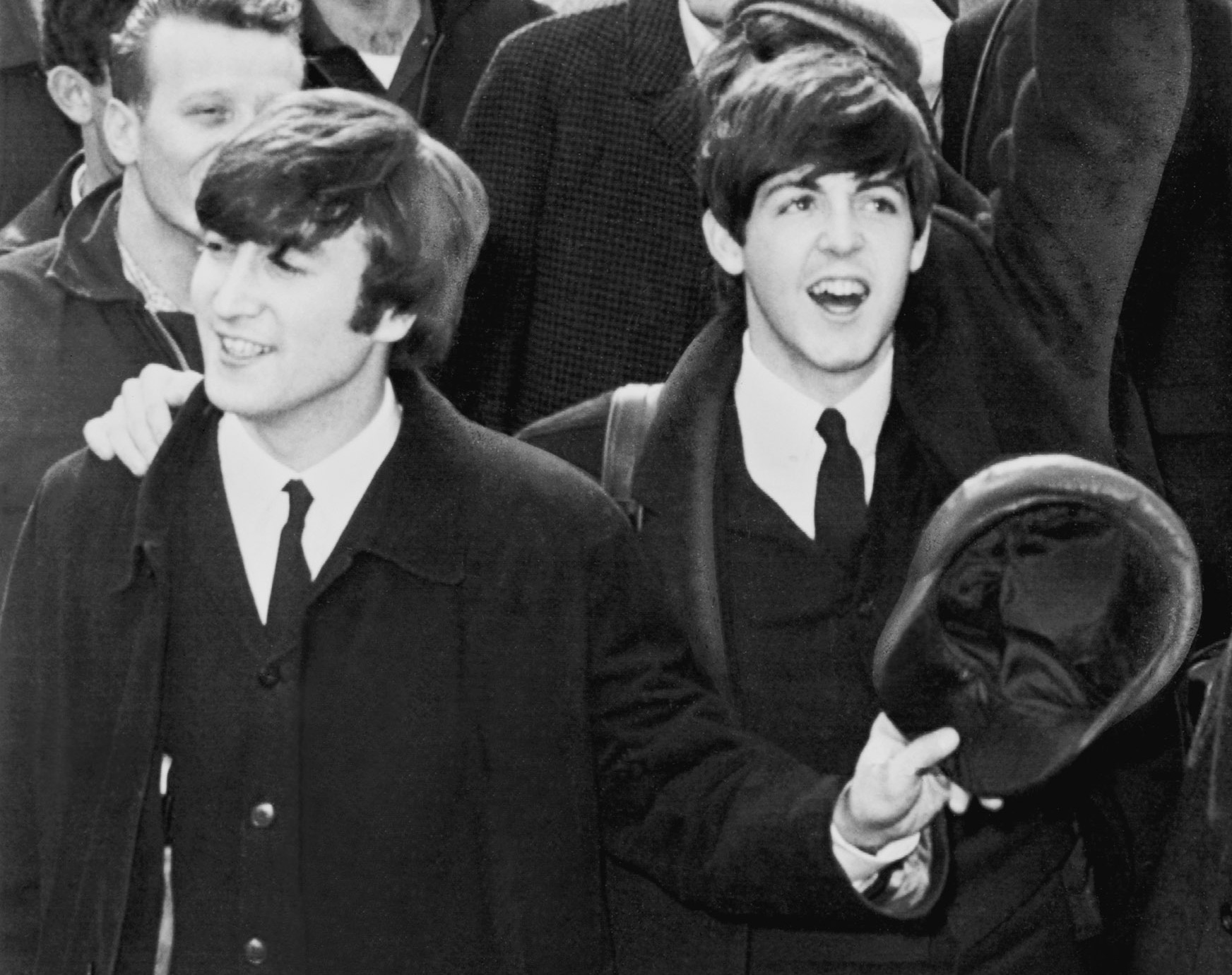
The Beatles' Lennon–McCartney catalogue is ATV Publishing's most valuable asset.

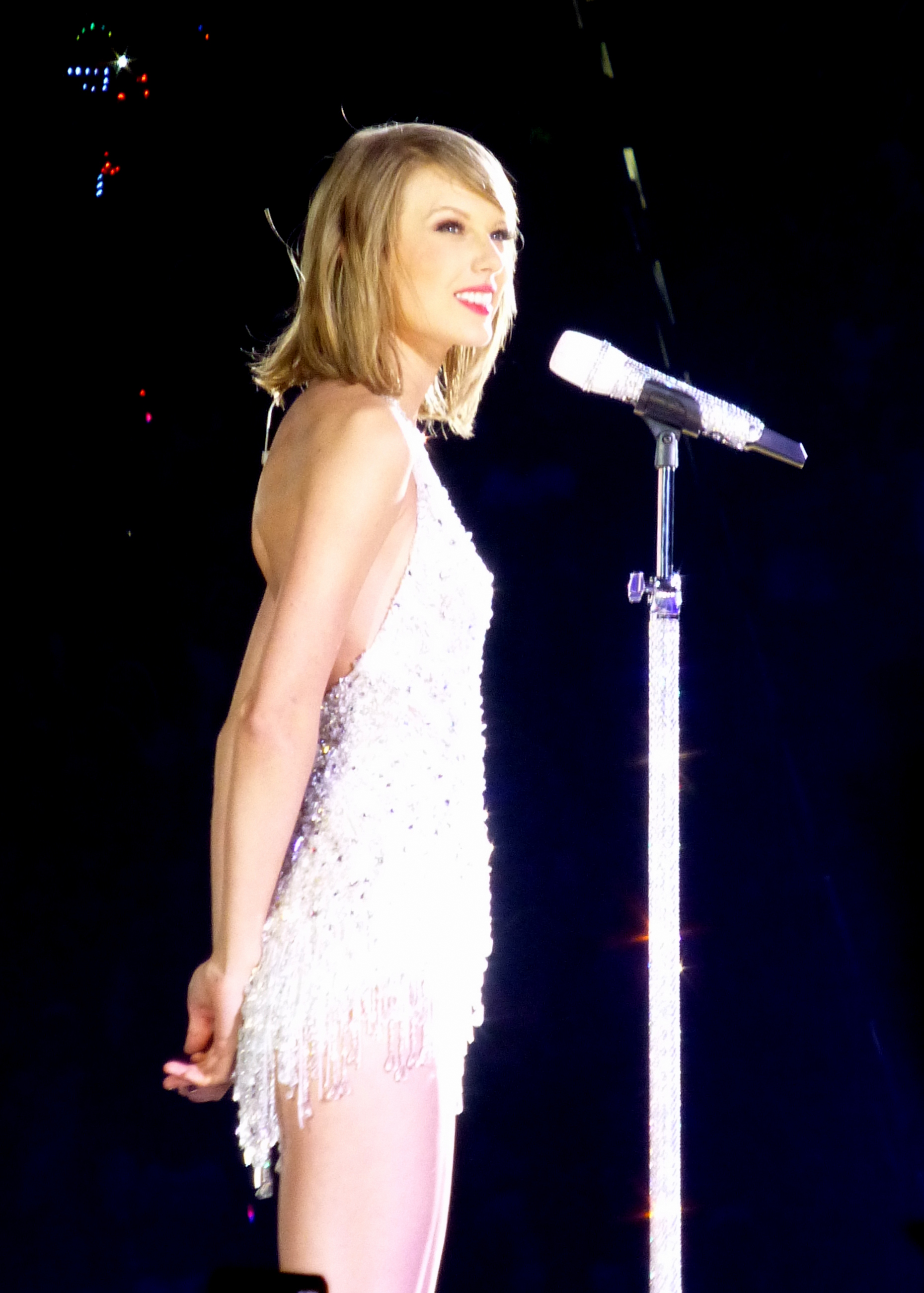
Taylor Swift is the youngest songwriter to have signed with Sony/ATV, joining the company at the age of 14.

- Talay Riley
- Taylor Swift
- Tata Young
- Teddy Geiger
- The Almost
- The Beautiful South
- The Beatles
- The Chainsmokers
- The Champs
- The Cheeky Girls
- The D.E.Y.
- The Everly Brothers
- The Game
- The Hoosiers
- The Kid Laroi
- The Kinks
- The Knickerbockers
- The Medic Droid
- The Mescaleros
- The Moody Blues
- The Newbeats
- The Philosopher Kings
- The Rasmus
- The Searchers
- The Starting Line
- The Ting Tings
- The Vines
- The Wreckers
- Tim McGraw
- Tiwa Savage
- Tom Jones
- Tomcraft
- Tony Christie
- Tori Kelly
- Travis
- Tweenies
- Tymes 4

== U ==
- UB40
- Unkle

== V ==
- V
- Valencia
- Vato Gonzalez
- Vinylz
- VS

== W ==
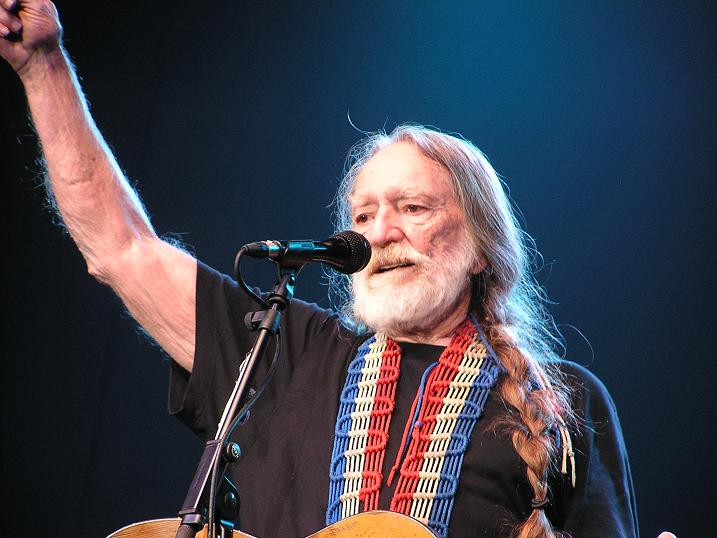
Willie Nelson

- We Are Scientists
- Westlife
- Wheatus
- Whitney Houston
- Will Smith
- Will Young
- Willie Nelson
- Wyclef Jean

== Z ==
- Zak Abel

== See also ==
- List of Sony Music artists
