= The Night of the Living Duck =

- Directed by: Greg Ford; Terry Lennon
- Story by: Greg Ford; Terry Lennon
- Produced by: Steven S. Greene
- Starring: Mel Blanc; Mel Tormé (singing voice)
- Music by: Music from previous cartoons by Carl Stalling and Milt Franklyn
- Animation by: Brenda Banks; Norm McCabe; Frans Vischer; Rebecca Rees; Mark Kausler
- Layouts by: Robert Givens; Lin Larsen
- Backgrounds by: Richard H. Thomas; Alan Bodner
- Production company: Warner Bros. Animation
- Distributed by: Warner Bros. Pictures
- Release dates: September 23, 1988 (New York Film Festival); September 24, 1988 (released with Daffy Duck's Quackbusters)
- Running time: 6 minutes
- Country: United States
- Language: English

The Night of the Living Duck is a six-minute 1988 Merrie Melodies cartoon starring Daffy Duck, directed by Greg Ford and Terry Lennon. It was released to theatres as a part of Daffy Duck's Quackbusters on September 24, 1988 and precedes the film in all subsequent releases, including in TV broadcasts and home media.

The title is a pun on Night of the Living Dead, although the cartoon has nothing to do with said film's theme of a zombie apocalypse.

This short was also one of Mel Blanc's final performances, as it was released less than a year before his death.

The short was shown on the opening day of the 1988 New York Film Festival before Pedro Almodovar's Women on the Verge of a Nervous Breakdown.

== Plot ==
Daffy Duck, engaging in his penchant for comic book reading akin to his previous cinematic exploits in The Great Piggy Bank Robbery, immerses himself in the gripping pages of "Hideous Tales". Enthralled by the narrative involving the enigmatic "Noseman" and the looming presence of "Schmodzilla," Daffy eagerly anticipates the continuation of the story in the subsequent issue, deeming it a coveted collector's item. However, his quest for the next installment is abruptly interrupted when a falling monster clock renders him unconscious.

In a dream sequence, Daffy finds himself as the emcee in a nightclub populated by an eclectic array of classic movie monsters such as Count Dracula, Frankenstein's monster, the Wolf Man and Alfred E. Neuman. Despite his initial trepidation, Daffy uses "Eau de Tormé" throat spray, giving him the real Mel Tormé's voice as he begins singing "Monsters Lead Such Interesting Lives."

Daffy's attempts at insult comedy anger Schmodzilla in the audience; Schmodzilla then devours Daffy. Daffy awakens in a wastebasket alongside the comic he sought with Schmodzilla on its cover. Dismissing the surreal encounter with a characteristic scoff, Daffy is confronted once more by the menacing persona of Schmodzilla, who quips "You were expecting maybe Calvin Coolidge?"

== Voice Characterizations ==
- Mel Blanc - Daffy Duck, Stage Manager, Schmodzilla

=== Daffy Duck's Singing Voice ===
- Mel Tormé

== Notes ==
- Alfred E. Neuman of MAD magazine fame appeared briefly in this short holding some drinks when the Creature from the Black Lagoon and his female captive were shown. An issue of MAD can also be seen at the start of the short. Both the short and Quackbusters would credit E.C. Comics for his appearance here in their end credits.
- Some of the monsters featured include Dracula, Frankenstein's monster, Bride of Frankenstein, Invisible Man, Creature from the Black Lagoon, The Blob, Medusa, The Fly, Leatherface, The Wolfman, and Godzilla, the latter called Smogzilla in the cartoon to avoid legal issues with Toho at the time (though Warner Bros. themselves would later distribute most of the Monsterverse films, which themselves feature Godzilla as a prominent character).
- In the opening sequence, Daffy has a "1978 Star Drek Convention" pass among the various comics and magazines, a reference to Star Trek.
