= The Book of Daniel (album) =

Studio album by Danny!
- Released: TBA
- Recorded: November 2015 – December 2017
- Length: 76:52
- Label: StarTower Music
- Producer: Danny!

Danny! chronology
Payback (2012)	The Book of Daniel (TBA)

The Book of Daniel, or How I Learned to Stop Worrying and Be the Bomb, more commonly known as The Book of Daniel, is the unreleased fourth studio album by American recording artist and producer Danny Swain under the name Danny!.

While Danny! announced a release date for the album of January 15, 2019, The Book of Daniel still has not yet been released.

== Background ==
During a years-long hiatus from recording music, Swain starred in a digital short for Sesame Street, composed music for an Emmy Award-winning episode of FOX's Bob's Burgers, and performed voiceover work for ESPN. Swain used the money earned from these contributions to continue funding what would become The Book of Daniel. In its original incarnation, originally titled Deliverance, The Book of Daniel largely relied on obscure production library music samples, not unlike Danny!'s first two studio albums And I Love H.E.R.: Original Motion Picture Soundtrack and Where Is Danny?.

The subtitle of The Book of Daniel is a reference to the subtitle of Stanley Kubrick's film Dr. Strangelove.

== Music and lyrics ==
The Book of Daniel is named after the biblical book of the same name, and features twelve songs.

Swain has credited the Beatles' 1967 song "Strawberry Fields Forever" as the album's initial source of that theme (similar to his debut album And I Love H.E.R., another album influenced by a diverse range of musical genres.

== Promotion ==
In anticipation for the new album, Swain leaked a snippet of "Sweet Virginia" on his Tumblr blog in early November 2015. He also shared instrumental cues on his Instagram page. The Fader premiered its then lead single "Constellations" two weeks prior to The Book of Daniel's original release date of February 29, 2016. The album was not released at that time.

As of 2018, Swain continues to preview new music from The Book of Daniel, primarily through Instagram. On his website he specified a release date of October 31, 2018, and later January 15, 2019, but the album has yet to be released. Nonetheless, audio snippets on Swain's website are still streamed today as proof of the album's existence alongside yet another tentative release year of 2025.

== Track listing ==
All songs written and produced by Daniel Swain (credited as Danny!).

No.	Title	Sample(s)	Length
1.	"The Gospel According To..."		5:13
2.	"Hello!" (featuring the MUSYCA Children's Choir)	Contains interpolations of "Normal American Kids", written and performed by Wilco.	4:20
3.	"Machine"	Contains elements from "The Man-Machine", written and performed by Kraftwerk.	6:47
4.	"Paul Is Dead"		3:14
5.	"Sweet Virginia / Mama, I'm Sorry"	Contains samples from "Nazdrave Ti, Chorbadjiio", performed by the Mystery of Bulgarian Voices Choir and "Candyman Suite: Opening Theme", composed by Philip Glass.	12:52
6.	"Why Not"		4:04
7.	"Love U 2 Much"	Contains a sample of the composition "I Love You Too Much", written and composed by Stevie Wonder.	5:42
8.	"Black Zombie, Pt. 2"		8:47
9.	"(They're Gonna) Let You Down"		8:44
10.	"My Dear Mother Agatha"	Contains excerpts from "Hum Ghar Sajan", composed and performed by Haruomi Hosono and Tadanori Yokoo.	4:57
11.	"Goodbye (Cruel World)"	Contains a sample of the composition "Blue Haze", composed by Alan Hawkshaw and Alan Parker.	5:36
12.	"Savior"	Contains elements from the composition "The World Is a Ghetto", composed by War and performed by George Benson.	6:36
Total length:			76:52

UK bonus tracks
No.	Title	Length
13.	"Constellations"	3:40

Japan bonus tracks
No.	Title	Length
13.	"Smile Away"	2:18
14.	"Perfect" (feat. Chell, Just Blaze and James Poyser)	2:51
