= Daffy Duck's Quackbusters =

1988 animated feature film

- Theatrical release poster
- Directed by: Greg Ford; Terry Lennon
- Written by: John W. Dunn; Michael Maltese; Tedd Pierce
- Story by: Greg Ford; Terry Lennon
- Based on: Daffy Duck by Tex Avery; Bob Clampett
- Produced by: Steven S. Greene; Kathleen Helppie-Shipley
- Starring: Mel Blanc; Julie Bennet; Roy Firestone; B.J. Ward
- Cinematography: Tim Whintall
- Edited by: Treg Brown
- Music by: Milt Franklyn; William Lava; Carl Stalling (Note: A majority come from old cartoons)
- Production company: Warner Bros. Animation
- Distributed by: Warner Bros. Pictures
- Release date: September 24, 1988
- Running time: 78 minutes
- Country: United States
- Language: English

Daffy Duck's Quackbusters is a 1988 animated compilation film featuring classic Warner Bros. Cartoons shorts and animated bridging sequences, starring Daffy Duck. The film was released to theaters by Warner Bros. Pictures on September 24, 1988. It was the final theatrical production in which Mel Blanc provided the voices of the various Looney Tunes characters before his death in July 1989.

Unlike previous compilation films, Quackbusters uses pre-existing music from older Looney Tunes shorts composed by Carl Stalling, Milt Franklyn and William Lava for both the new animation and classic footage. It was also one of the two compilation films of classic Warner Bros. cartoon shorts not composed by Robert J. Walsh (the other being 1979's The Bugs Bunny/Road Runner Movie, which was composed by Dean Elliott).

Similar to The Looney Looney Looney Bugs Bunny Movie (1981), which was preceded with the Oscar-winning Knighty Knight Bugs (1958), Quackbusters is preceded with a short The Night of the Living Duck (1988), which is exclusive to the film. It also includes the other exclusive short The Duxorcist (1987), which was previously released theatrically with Nuts the previous year, as part of the film's plot, and was shown as an individual short years later. This film is inspired by Ghostbusters (1984). Most of the stories included in the compilation have a comedy horror theme, with ones involving spirit possession, exorcism, Transylvanian vampires, magic words, and Yetis.

== Plot ==
Salesman Daffy Duck tries to make a pitch to reclusive millionaire and "ailing buzzsaw baron" J.P. Cubish – a dog who has offered wealth to anyone who can make him laugh before he passes on. Daffy becomes his jester, taking uncounted pies in the face while Cubish laughs. After Cubish literally dies laughing, Daffy inherits his fortune. The money is locked in a safe, under the provision that it will be used to provide a beneficial public service and Daffy follow Cubish's creed to display honesty in business affairs. If the now-wealthy Daffy does not comply with the will's terms, Cubish's ghost will reclaim the fortune. The irked Daffy vows to use the money to wipe out ghosts such as Cubish.

Setting himself up as a "Paranormalist at Large", Daffy persuades Bugs Bunny to appear in commercials and hires Porky Pig (accompanied by Sylvester) as an underling; Cubish makes money from the safe vanish whenever Daffy seems to do or say something dishonest. Meanwhile, Sylvester is continually chased by a monstrous version of Tweety and develops paranoia in front of Daffy and Porky. Daffy assigns Porky to investigate the resort town of Dry Gulch for any suspicious ghost activity. Porky is accompanied by Sylvester, who defends his owner from the hotel's killer mice.

Meanwhile, Daffy receives a call from Thelma, a golden blonde-haired lady duck with a human-like form, who says her house is being haunted. Daffy quickly rushes over and discovers a series of supernatural oddities in the kitchen such as a frozen oven, a burning refrigerator, and a speeding train in a drawer. He then sees Thelma and is immediately attached to her but soon finds out that she is possessed, so he starts reading ghost jokes. Amused, the three ghosts that possessed Thelma leave their host and chase Daffy down the street with the Thelma calling out for his return. Soon after, Daffy discovers that Cubish has stripped his money down to his last $1 million. Daffy reassigns Porky to the Superstition Mountains, much to Sylvester's chagrin. After receiving a call from Transylvania, Daffy assigns Bugs to investigate. Bugs encounters Count Blood Count and defeats him in a duel of magic words, but Daffy is displeased to hear from him about "getting two couples together". After receiving a call from the Himalayas, Daffy phones Bugs again, and together, they go up against Hugo the Abominable Snowman.

When the city is swept with reports of a tiny elephant, Daffy, presuming this to be mere hysteria, hopes to profit by soothing the public with his "expert" testimony that there is no such thing. A tiny elephant then turns up on Daffy's television interview, rendering him a public laughing stock. Daffy decides to blame someone else for the debacle and absent-mindedly remarks that a small amount of dishonesty in business is justifiable. This causes Cubish to seize the last of his fortune, leaving behind a few cobwebs and a sign taunting Daffy over his loss. Egghead appears with a singing telegram, announcing to Daffy that due to unpaid rent, he is being dispossessed. After the repo crew takes away his desks, the building is condemned and destroyed, with Daffy still inside.

In the epilogue, Bugs enjoys his vacation in Palm Springs and reads about Daffy's downfall, while Porky and Sylvester are stranded in the Superstition Mountains and Cubish is still dead with his gravestone shown. Meanwhile, Daffy becomes a salesman again, this time selling paranormal-themed trinkets. However, when he earns a dollar bill, Cubish instantly makes it disappear again.

=== Film segments in order ===
Several cartoons are re-edited either for time, to connect with the plot, or have redubbed lines.

- The Night of the Living Duck (directed by Greg Ford and Terry Lennon) – Mel Tormé provides Daffy's singing voice.
- Daffy Dilly (1948) (directed by Chuck Jones) – used at beginning when Daffy tries to get to Cubish; with the report on Cubish now shown on TV; this short is used as one of the central elements in the film.
- The Prize Pest (1951) (directed by Robert McKimson) – used when Daffy recruits Porky; shortened starting from when Daffy warns Porky of his "split personality", cutting to before Porky hides in a closet and ending after Porky accidentally scares himself.
- Water, Water Every Hare (1952) (directed by Chuck Jones) – used progressively for the Paranormalists at Large commercials.
- Hyde and Go Tweet (1960) (directed by Friz Freleng) – Sylvester encounters Tweety, who changes into a monster without him realizing it, which leads to his paranoia; edited with new animation showing that Sylvester had gone into Daffy's office.
- Claws for Alarm (1954) (directed by Chuck Jones) – Porky and Sylvester's Dry Gulch assignment, with Porky's lines up to when they arrive at the hotel redubbed.
- The Duxorcist (1987) (directed by Greg Ford and Terry Lennon) – Daffy's first assignment, where he ends up getting temporarily possessed.
- Transylvania 6-5000 (1963) (directed by Chuck Jones) – Bugs' Transylvania assignment also featuring Count Bloodcount Agatha and Emily the Two-Headed Vulture; the short's opening credits have been removed, most of Bugs' lines are redubbed to reflect the film's plot and the ending where Bugs' ears turn into bat wings and Bugs flies away was cut and replaced with Bugs calling Daffy.
- The Abominable Snow Rabbit (1961) (directed by Chuck Jones) – Bugs and Daffy's Himalayas assignment; the opening is altered to reflect the plot.
- Punch Trunk (1953) (directed by Chuck Jones) – a miniature elephant wanders through town, having many encounters with various people; the cartoon was heavily shortened with the bird bath scene edited to reflect the plot. In the credits, the title was mistakenly read as "Punch Truck".
- Jumpin' Jupiter (1955) (directed by Chuck Jones) – seen in epilogue, identified as the Superstition Mountains.

== Voice cast ==
- Mel Blanc as Daffy Duck, Bugs Bunny, Porky Pig, Sylvester (archive), Tweety (archive), Hugo the Abominable Snowman (archive), J.P. Cubish, J.P. Cubish's Butler (archive), Mr. Hyde (archive), Birdbath Owner (archive), Asylum Collector (archive), Coyote (archive), Drunk (archive)
- Mel Tormé as Daffy Duck (singing voice)
- Roy Firestone as Announcer
- B.J. Ward as Thelma
- Ben Frommer as Count Bloodcount (archive)
- Julie Bennett as Agatha and Emily the Two-Headed Vulture (archive)
- Mark Kausler as Egghead

== Animators ==
The animators included Brenda Banks, Nancy Beiman, Dan Haskett, Mark Kausler, Norman McCabe, Rebecca Rees, Darrell Van Citters and Frans Vischer.

== Release ==
The film was theatrically released on September 24, 1988. A home video release followed on July 19, 1989.

== Reception ==
Variety called it an "entertaining effort" but felt the "effect wears thin on big screen". The reviewer felt that the structuring of the material worked except for the "commercial breaks" of Daffy selling his products on television.

== Home media ==
The film was released on VHS on July 19, 1989 (just nine days after Mel Blanc's death), and later on DVD in the United States on August 4, 2009, by Warner Home Video. Three bonus cartoons are included as extras in the DVD release: Duck Dodgers and the Return of the 24½th Century, Superior Duck and Little Go Beep. It was later released in the UK on July 5, 2021, with the same bonus shorts. It is also available on iTunes. The film was later released on Blu-ray via the Warner Archive Collection on January 28, 2025.

The Duxorcist saw an individual release as part of the Looney Tunes Parodies Collection on February 4, 2020.

This was the only Looney Tunes compilation film to be aired on HBO in the early 1990s. It later aired on Cartoon Network.

== See also ==
- List of animated feature films
- List of package films
