= Danny Is Dead =

EP by Danny!
- Released: July 16, 2007
- Recorded: May 2007
- Genre: Hip-hop
- Length: 30:00
- Label: Badenov Records/1911 Music
- Producer: Danny!

Danny! chronology
Dream, Fulfilled (2007)	Danny Is Dead (2007)	21st Century Masters: The Millennium Collection: The Best of Danny! (2007)

Danny Is Dead, the first EP and fourth studio album from American rapper/producer Danny!, is a half-hour-long EP that was released July 17, 2007 (see 2007 in music) on Danny!'s 1911 Music/Badenov Records vanity label. The eight-song record is the extended play follow-up to his critically acclaimed 2006 album Charm and composed primarily of reducia from Charm's standout tracks (namely, "Now You're Gone", "Cafe Surreal" and "Fly").

Like all of the titles in Danny!'s catalogue, production on Danny Is Dead was helmed solely by Danny! himself. There are also no guest appearances or features on the album, making Danny Is Dead the first record since Danny!'s debut, The College Kicked-Out, to be a completely solo effort.

== Overview ==
=== Reception ===
Professional ratings
Review scores
Source	Rating
AllMusic	3.5/5 stars
Okayplayer	(83/100)
PopMatters	6/10 stars
Stylus	B+

The record was well received and touted by critics as a sign of great music to come from Danny!. PopMatters optimistically stated that while Danny! certainly "has a brilliant album in him", Danny Is Dead ultimately "lacks the amazingness of both what he’s done and what he’s likely to do". RapReviews.com gave the album an 8.5 out of 10—the same score given to Charm—and offered that Danny! "continues to impress...this rapper's career [is] definitely on the rise".

Overall Danny Is Dead was hailed as an enjoyable album, short enough to not overwhelm listeners and long enough to keep them interested in future material. Presumably playing up his claims of being "A Tribe Called Quest on acid", Danny!'s first single from Danny Is Dead, entitled "Check It Out", is, for all intents and purposes, an energetic remake of their 1998 single "Find A Way". This song was the most well-received track from Danny Is Dead (followed closely by "Fly, Pt. 2"), and was briefly featured by sites such as Pitchfork, URB and Okayplayer, who would later relaunch their record label division and sign Danny! as their first artist.

=== Availability ===
Danny Is Dead was, like Charm before it, released worldwide through retail chains such as Best Buy, Barnes & Noble and FYE. More copies were pre-ordered and subsequently sold than anticipated, and a second short run of discs were pressed up not even a month after Danny Is Dead's July 17 release date. As a result, the album was listed as "out of stock" or "back-ordered" for several weeks, much to the dismay of fans attempting to track down the EP.

Three different versions of Danny Is Dead were manufactured and shipped to various outlets in different regions of the world. HMV's UK and Japanese stores have since stocked the item; on the Japanese retail version sold on HMV Japan, the bonus track "Just Friends (Live)" is included at the end of an instrumental reprise of "Now You're Back". In England, the never-before-released "Fullaschidt, Pt. 2" (also known as "Fullaschidt (remix)") is preceded by "Outro (Dead...?)", just as "Ebony Flower" is on the North American retail version. As of August 2007, only the Japanese retail version has been made available for sale on iTunes.

== Track listing ==
No.	Title	Music	Sample(s)	Length
1.	"Now You're Back" (Swain, Holland, Dozier, Holland, Gaye, Johnson)	Produced by Danny!	Contains elements from "Since I Fell For You", by Laura Lee.	2:57
2.	"The World Is Yours" (Swain, R. Glenn, Mizell)	Produced by Danny!		3:51
3.	"Rhyme Writer Crime Fighter" (Swain, Gray)	Produced by Danny!	Contains elements from "Beverly Hills", by Steve Gray.	2:41
4.	"Press Conference" (Swain, Coleman, Rushen, Rushen)	Produced by Danny!		4:49
5.	"Cafe Surreal, Pt. 2" (Swain, Fickert, Groschner, Kallio, Linstadt, Linstadt, Malm, Rantala, Ruppert)	Produced by Danny!		4:24
6.	"Fly, Pt. 2" (Swain, Pasqua, Williams)	Produced by Danny!	Contains samples from "Lady Jane", by Tony Williams.	3:20
7.	"Check It Out" (Swain, Dong-hwa, Gilberto, Muhammad, Fareed, Taylor, Yancey)	Produced by Danny!	Contains elements from "Technova", by Towa Tei.	3:57
8.	"Outro (Dead...?)"	Produced by Danny!		3:58

UK Bonus Track
No.	Title	Sample(s)	Length
9.	"Fullaschidt, Pt. 2" (Swain, Hawes, Jefferson, Simmons)	Contains samples from "They Just Can't Stop It (Games People Play)", by the Spinners.	2:55

Japan Bonus Track
No.	Title	Length
9.	"Just Friends (Live)" (Swain)	3:08

== Credits ==
- Danny! – executive producer, producer, composer, featured vocals

== Release history ==
Country	Date
United Kingdom	July 16, 2007
United States	July 17, 2007
Japan	August 6, 2007
