= Performer (magazine) =

American music magazine established in 1991

- Performer Magazine logo
- Editor: Benjamin Ricci
- Frequency: Monthly
- Circulation: 60,000 (approx)
- Publisher: William House (Performer Publications, Inc.)
- First issue: ca. 1991
- Country: United States
- Based in: Somerville, Massachusetts
- Language: English
- Website: performermag.com

Performer is an American music magazine aimed at independent musicians. It has been in publication since 1991 and is distributed nationally throughout the United States. The magazine focuses primarily on musicians who are unsigned and on small labels, and their success in a DIY environment. According to its website, it is dedicated to promoting lesser-known talent and being the first to introduce its readership to promising new artists. Performer is currently a free publication that also covers the following areas of the independent music industry: promoters, instruments, music business advice, artists, and reviews.

Up until 2009, Performer circulated three regional editions of the magazine each month (Northeast Performer, Southeast Performer and West Coast Performer).

In 2010, the company combined the previous three regional editions into one national monthly magazine.
