= Brittany Bosco =

American R&B singer

Brittany Bosco, officially known by her stage name BOSCO, is an American R&B singer from Savannah, Georgia.

== Biography ==
She was born in Savannah, and attended the Savannah College of Art & Design, majoring in fashion design. As a student at the Savannah College of Art & Design, she released her first two projects City of Nowhere (2008) and Spectrum 2.0 (2009), but both projects received very little attention. In 2014, Bosco attracted the attention of Fool's Gold Records, with whom she would release music for the next three years. In 2017, the same year Bosco released her EP b., she founded Slug Agency, a record label and artist agency explicitly created for artists of color.

In June 2021, the trade publication Adweek named Bosco as one of its "Creative 100" for 2021.

== Discography ==
=== Albums ===
- Spectrum 2.0 (2009)
- Girls in the Yard (with Speakerfoxxx)(2016)
- b. (2017)
- Some Day This Will All Make Sense (2020)

=== Singles and EPs ===
- Spectrum (2008)
- Let Go of Me (2012)
- "Treasure Fingers ft Bosco - Names" (2014)
- "Treasure Fingers ft Bosco - Myne" (2015)
- "Boy" (2015)
- "Mortal Kombat" (2017)
- "Castles" (2017)
