= Dream, Extinguished =

Studio album by Danny!
- Released: January 24, 2008 (U.S.) (cancelled); June 23, 2009 (Japan)
- Length: 51:20
- Label: Badenov Records/1911 Music
- Producer: Danny!

Danny! chronology
Behind the Beats, Vol. 2 (2007)	Dream, Extinguished (2008)	And I Love H.E.R.: Original Motion Picture Soundtrack (2008)

Professional ratings
Review scores
Source	Rating
AllMusic	4.5/5 stars
RapReviews	7.5/10 stars

Dream, Extinguished is an instrumental hip hop album by American producer/rapper Danny! It is the third and allegedly final installment in Danny's famed Dream... instrumental series and, like its predecessors, bears Danny's anthroponym on its cover—an ominous all-black sleeve—rather than his stage name in an effort to distinguish himself from Daniel Swain the record producer and Danny!, his rapper alter ego. Originally intended for an April release, Dream, Extinguished's date was moved forward to January 29 to compensate for the unforeseen delay of And I Love H.E.R., his fifth studio album.

Unlike the first two entries in the Dream... trilogy, a promotional tagline for Dream, Extinguished does not exist.

== Cancellation and subsequent release ==
A mere day before it was set to be released to the market in 2008, Dream, Extinguished was withdrawn by Danny himself, much to the surprise of anticipating fans. For reasons unknown Danny abandoned the entire project, leaving only a sparse quantity of promotional copies in U.S. circulation. As a result, Dream, Extinguished became the first and, to date, only title in Danny's discography to not be released, making it the most coveted record in his extensive catalogue.

Rumors of the project being given a proper domestic release were confirmed in late May 2009 via Danny!'s website. The Japanese version of Dream, Extinguished made its first retail appearance on June 23, 2009, via iTunes and other major digital stores with a track listing (allegedly chronicling a year-long relationship that ended on sour terms) that closely, but not entirely, mirrors its American counterpart; three years later, the European version came out. It is not known when, if ever, Dream, Extinguished will be released in its original incarnation.

As all three of Danny!'s instrumental albums were dually promoted as beat tapes, a few of the tracks included on Dream, Extinguished were later utilized by rappers such as Danny Brown, Lil B and Wale on their respective projects long after its release.

== American track listing ==
1. "Intro" – 0:09
  - Produced by Daniel Swain
2. "Parisian Sunrise" – 1:55
  - Produced by Daniel Swain
3. "So Peaceful" – 2:10
  - Produced by Daniel Swain
  - Contains elements from "Peaceful", by Al Johnson, from the 1978 album Peaceful.
4. "God Bless The Child" – 2:10
  - Produced by Daniel Swain
  - Contains a sample from "Cry To Me", by Loleatta Holloway, from the 1975 album Cry To Me and "Brokenhearted", by Brandy from the 1994 album Brandy
5. "Lucky Me" – 2:10
  - Produced by Daniel Swain
  - Contains elements from "The Dream" by Patrice Rushen, from the 1980 album Posh.
6. "Danny, Why Hasn't Your Def Jux Album Come Out Yet (It's Been More Than A Year, Yo)" – 1:53
  - Produced by Daniel Swain
  - Contains samples from "Amebo", by the Lijadu Sisters, from the 1976 album, Danger
7. "Crasy Sound" – 1:46
  - Produced by Daniel Swain
  - Contains elements from "Summer Weaving", by Melanie, from the 1972 album Stoneground Words.
8. "Been Away" – 3:07
  - Produced by Daniel Swain
9. "Still Royalty (Learned From The Best)" – 2:19
  - Contains a sample from "Let's Do It In Slow Motion" by Latimore, from the 1977 album It Ain't Where You Been.
  - Produced by Daniel Swain
10. "Fruitbootin'" – 2:39
  - Produced by Daniel Swain
  - Contains elements from "We've Only Just Begun", by Grant Green, from the 1971 album ' ' Visions' '.
11. "Jabberwocky" – 1:22
  - Produced by Daniel Swain
12. "Never Say Never" – 1:50
  - Produced by Daniel Swain
  - Contains samples from "Love Rain", by Jill Scott, from the 2000 album Who Is Jill Scott? Words and Sounds Vol. 1
13. "When I Need Some Love" – 3:59
  - Contains a sample from "I Don't Know No One Else To Turn To" by Melba Moore, from the 1977 album A Portrait of Melba.
  - Produced by Daniel Swain
14. "Smoff" – 1:25
  - Produced by Daniel Swain
15. "Janelle Monáe" – 1:29
  - Produced by Daniel Swain
  - Contains samples from "Every Little Thing U Do", by Christopher Williams, from the 1992 album Changes
16. "Minute Of Your Time" – 1:00
  - Produced by Daniel Swain
17. "Time's Up" – 1:28
  - Produced by Daniel Swain
18. "Lonely Nest" – 1:20
  - Produced by Daniel Swain
  - Contains a sample from "Loneliness Remembers (What Happiness Forgets)", by Stephanie Mills, from the 1975 album, For The First Time
19. "My Baby (remix)" – 3:16
  - Produced by Daniel Swain
  - Contains samples from "Distant Lover", by Marvin Gaye, from the 1973 album Let's Get It On.
20. "Jet Society" – 3:30
  - Produced by Daniel Swain
21. "Hurt No More" – 2:40
  - Contains a sample from "I Need You Now" by Cherrelle, from the 1984 album Fragile.
  - Produced by Daniel Swain
22. "Easy, Breezy, Beautiful" – 4:10
  - Produced by Daniel Swain
23. "São Paulo Sunset (Kiss Your Dreams Goodbye)" – 3:33
  - Produced by Daniel Swain

== Japanese track listing ==
1. "Intro" – 0:09
  - Produced by Daniel Swain
2. "New Beginning" – 1:35
  - Produced by Daniel Swain
3. "I Am Music" – 1:52
  - Produced by Daniel Swain
  - Contains samples from "Stay With Me", by Marz, from the 1982 album Make It Right.
4. "God Bless The Child" – 2:09
  - Produced by Daniel Swain
  - Contains a sample from "Cry To Me", by Loleatta Holloway, from the 1975 album Cry To Me and "Brokenhearted", by Brandy from the 1994 album Brandy
5. "Lucky Me" – 2:10
  - Produced by Daniel Swain
  - Contains elements from "The Dream" by Patrice Rushen, from the 1980 album Posh.
6. "Better Than I've Ever Been" – 1:28
  - Produced by Daniel Swain
  - Contains a sample from "Does He Treat You Better?", by Unique Blend
7. "Däs Boot" – 2:22
  - Produced by Daniel Swain
  - Contains elements from "B. Is For Basse", by Raymond Guiot, from the 1973 album Basse Contre Basse
8. "Pineapple Gumdrop" – 2:17
  - Produced by Daniel Swain
  - Contains elements from "It's Easy", by Nick Ingman, from the 1976 album Distinctive Themes / Race To Achievement.
9. "Still Royalty (Learned From The Best)" – 2:19
  - Contains a sample from "Let's Do It In Slow Motion" by Latimore, from the 1977 album It Ain't Where You Been.
  - Produced by Daniel Swain
10. "The Radio" – 2:53
  - Produced by Daniel Swain
11. "Tight" – 3:00
  - Contains samples from "Next Time I See You" by Sylvia, from her 1973 album Pillow Talk.
  - Produced by Daniel Swain
12. "Never Say Never" – 1:49
  - Produced by Daniel Swain
13. "Cat On A Hot Tin Rufus" – 2:26
  - Produced by Daniel Swain
  - Contains samples from "Mariana Mariana", by Maria Bethânia, from the 1971 album, A Tua Presença
14. "The Merry-Go-Round Broke Down Again" – 3:26
  - Produced by Daniel Swain
15. "Janelle Monáe" – 1:29
  - Produced by Daniel Swain
  - Contains samples from "Every Little Thing U Do", by Christopher Williams, from the 1992 album Changes.
16. "So I Say To You (One For Sylvia)" – 1:39
  - Contains an interpolation of "So I Say To You" by Sylvia St. James, from her 1980 album Magic.
  - Produced by Daniel Swain
17. "Hey!" – 2:14
  - Produced by Daniel Swain
  - Contains elements from "Daylight", by RAMP, from the 1977 album Come Into Knowledge
18. "Danny's Lament" – 2:31
  - Produced by Daniel Swain
  - Contains samples from "When I'm Gone", by The Jones Girls, from the 1980 album, At Peace With Woman
19. "Loser" – 2:14
  - Produced by Daniel Swain
20. "A Minute Of Your Time, Pt. 2" – 1:00
  - Produced by Daniel Swain
21. "Liberian Girl (IsAHeartlessWenchButItsHereditarySoItMakesSense)" – 2:36
  - Produced by Daniel Swain
22. "I'm Leavin'" – 2:10
  - Produced by Daniel Swain
  - Contains samples from "Never Can Say Goodbye", by The Jackson 5, from the 1971 album, Maybe Tomorrow
23. "Panamanian Sunset (Kiss Your Dreams Goodbye Again)" – 14:00
  - Produced by Daniel Swain

== Credits ==
- Danny! – Executive Producer, Producer, Composer
- Danny! – Art Direction, Creative Director
