= Charm (Danny! album) =

Studio album by Danny!
- Released: March 14, 2006 (U.S.)
- Recorded: October–November 2005
- Genre: Hip hop
- Length: 73:00
- Label: Badenov Records/1911 Music
- Producer: Danny!

Danny! chronology
F.O.O.D. (2005)	Charm (2006)	Dream, Interrupted (2006)

Charm is the critically acclaimed third studio album from American rapper/record producer Danny!, and the first of his records to be released commercially. As evidenced in the title, Charm was a huge milestone in Danny!'s career; after two unsuccessful attempts to make a name for himself in the music world (2004's The College Kicked-Out and 2005's F.O.O.D.), the record unanimously won rave reviews, culminating in the inclusion of the album on the 49th Annual Grammy Awards short list and, eventually, a record deal with Definitive Jux Records.

Widely regarded as one of the strongest entries in his discography (rivaled by 2008's And I Love H.E.R.), Charm helped Danny! achieve a moderate buzz in the underground hip-hop community and become South Carolina's most heralded hip-hop artist to date. The song "Cafe Surreal" from this album would go on to become a signature tune in commercial bumpers for the MTV early morning video countdown program aMTV, being played since its pilot in early 2009, and was also featured in a 2013 ad campaign for Crown Royal.

== Overview ==
=== Development ===
It is widely assumed that Danny!'s admiration for The Miracles' album City of Angels, and the subsequent reinterpretation of its storyline for Charm, was initiated in 2005 when he sampled one of its songs for his second album, F.O.O.D. "Poor Charlotte", a somber ballad chronicling the life of a young woman longing for Hollywood stardom at any and all costs, was used for F.O.O.D. 's title track.

The chilling story about what one risks—in this case, one's own life—to become successful in the entertainment industry so moved Danny! that he scrapped his original plans for a third album—revealed on "We Gon' Make It" from his previous LP to be a sequel to F.O.O.D.—to narrate a story of his own, and Charm was born.

=== Synopsis ===
The album opens up with an introduction ("Intro") that features a montage of clips from Danny!'s previous songs. After a brief commentary from a very self-aware Danny!, he proceeds into a verse that explains his motives for pursuing a music career, brushes off critics by admitting he purposely chose not to be too complex with his lyrics, but that he could easily do so whenever he so chose, and reveals that during his rise to fame he nearly lost his passion. The album's "story" truly begins with the second track ("Give Me A Chance"). Now in narrator mode, Danny! plays the role of a desperate musician, also named Danny, who feels he deserves recognition for his contributions to music and longs for stardom and wealth.

Two verses into the song, Danny! receives a message on his answering machine from an A&R executive at Galaxy Records willing to sign him to the label. When the next song ("Charm") begins, Danny! is riding high on his newfound success and describes in great detail the negativity he faced to get to where he is. The album then proceeds into "It's Okay", a short song in which Danny! reassures his family that things are looking up and, now that he's achieved success, their financial woes are over.

After preparing for his first world tour ("Can't Wait"), Danny!'s employer urges him to return to his job, lest he face termination. Torn between stardom and his responsibilities at home he briefly returns, lamenting about his nine-to-five daily routine. His complaints are cut short, however, by a groupie who sends him a text message soliciting him for sex ("Temptation"). After a battle between him and his conscience Danny! reluctantly gives in, only to regret his decision. After finally becoming willing to leave his hometown—with the incorrect assumption that he would be escaping similar temptations in the future—he announces his arrival for a second time ("The Last Laugh") and wryly pokes fun at those who made it difficult for him to achieve success ("Duck Soup").

Much to his dismay, Danny!'s first encounter on the road is marred by racism ("Strange Fruit") as an unscrupulous hotel manager who learns of Danny!'s skin color prevents him and his friends from checking into a room he had previously reserved. On top of that, the mother of his child has been accusing Danny! of having let the fame go to his head ("What Now"), an accusation that Danny! vehemently denies. Hoping to temporarily forget his troubles, a good friend invites him out to a club ("Move Somethin'") in the area. However, after a few drinks too many, Danny! is whisked away by his manager to a venue in which he had been scheduled to perform (but presumably forgot about due to his excessive drinking at the club).

In his dressing room Danny! turns back to his bottle ("My Problem") and laments to himself all the issues he's had to deal with as a result of his fame. While naming out countless problems—family turning their back on him, not being able to shop without being mobbed—his only real "problem", alcoholism, takes an ugly toll and Danny! blacks out six minutes before he is scheduled to go on stage. Consequently, Danny! is rushed off to the hospital and his show is cancelled.

En route to the hospital Danny! laments again that, despite his escaping the day-to-day routine of his hometown, his life is still much like a merry-go-round ("Carousel") in which he does not wish to ride. His health regained, he heads to the studio to begin work on his album but the label pressures him to use the same clichés and nonsense prevalent in his genre of music ("Lip Flappin'"). Frustrated, he storms out of the studio and lashes out at those who feel they deserve a piece of Danny!'s success ("You Owe Me").

Meanwhile, an affair that Danny! becomes involved in with another man's wife takes a nasty turn as the woman is murdered by her trucker husband ("Where Were You"). Visibly shaken, Danny! resumes his tour but becomes extremely paranoid about the audience's response, or lack thereof, to his performances ("No Guarantees (remix)"). It is at this point that Danny! learns that fame is not all that it's cracked out to be. Wishing for a return to the way things once were ("Fly"), Danny! decides to resign from music while wistfully imagining how his career would've turned out without the stifling of his creative freedom ("Cafe Surreal").

Danny! eventually awakens ("Rise & Shine (interlude)") to realize that everything that had transpired was merely an all-too-real dream. The mother of his child continues to chastise him for his decision to pursue a music career, financial woes are still in existence and he is still obligated to the job he dreads going to. Despite his drudgery, Danny! couldn't be happier. His daughter's mother urges him to check the answering machine for a message left for him; upon playback it is revealed to be an A&R executive from the aforementioned Galaxy Records, interested in signing Danny! to a recording contract just like his dream had foretold. But now that he is well aware of the dangers of fame, will Danny! bite at the chance of stardom in real life? His decision is not revealed and is left up to the listener's imagination.

Following the conclusion of the story, Danny! steps out of narrator mode and laments the loss of two former close friends, one by death and one by disassociation, on Charm's epilogue ("Now You're Gone"). Charm ends abruptly near the end of Danny!'s final verse, making it to the 73-minute mark and ending on a defeated, sorrowful note.

=== Reception ===
Professional ratings
Review scores
Source	Rating
Allmusic	4/5 stars
Hip-Hop Linguistics	3.5/5 stars
Okayplayer	(89/100)
RapReviews.com	8.5/10 stars
Stylus Magazine	B

Both fans and music editors have since praised Charm not just for its cohesiveness and overall concept, but for Danny!'s seemingly effortless way of pulling it all off. Even the most hard-nosed of critics, who may have previously bashed Danny!'s first two albums, have admitted to the appeal of the record, considering Charm to be Danny!'s definitive album. Since this was the first time many had even heard of Danny!, most reviewers felt as if he just "popped up out of nowhere"; RapReviews's Steve Juon inquired how "somebody with Danny!'s talents fell through the cracks...and remained completely beneath my radar".

Clocking in at a staggering seventy-three minutes even and twenty-one tracks, critics that have since praised the record have also, in the same breath, denounced it for being too bulky. Each track feeds on the previous song in sequence, and virtually every track is preceded by a voicemail "skit" that presumably ties in with the song that it follows.

Few have disputed the fact that Charm is one of Danny!'s strongest works to date, with much of its content either based on events that had actually transpired in Danny!'s life, or that would eerily play itself out in the wake of Charm 's success (for example, receiving a phone call from an interested record label). The record would go on to quietly achieve a great deal of success: music critics applauded his efforts immensely, media websites began hosting his discography and in October 2006, the first of two ballots drafted for the Grammy Awards of 2007 nomination process included songs from Charm in four different fields, spanning seven categories.

Definitive Jux Records caught wind of various tracks from Charm via a talent contest sponsored in part by MTVu and, impressed with what they heard, added Danny! to their roster of artists in January 2007, ultimately giving him his big break. However, the Def Jux partnership never yielded any actual music released by the label; Danny! would go on to release several studio albums and instrumental records independently before signing on with Interscope Records and, later, Okayplayer.

== Track listing ==
No.	Title	Music	Sample(s)	Length
1.	"Intro" (Swain, Benson)	Produced by Danny!	Contains samples from "You're Never Too Far From Me", by George Benson.	3:55
2.	"Give Me a Chance" (Swain, Watson)	Produced by Danny!	Contains elements from "Strung Out", by Johnny "Guitar" Watson.	3:25
3.	"Charm" (Swain, Greenfield, Keller)	Produced by Danny!	Contains samples from "Everybody's Somebody's Fool", by Michael Jackson.	4:25
4.	"It's Okay" (Swain, Kinsey, Winslow)	Produced by Danny!		1:32
5.	"Can't Wait" (Swain, Green)	Produced by Danny!	Contains elements from "Judy", by Al Green.	4:00
6.	"Temptation" (Swain, Sylvers)	Produced by Danny!	Contains samples from "I'll Never Let You Go", by The Sylvers.	4:16
7.	"The Last Laugh" (Swain, Mancini, Mercer)	Produced by Danny!		2:33
8.	"Duck Soup" (Swain, Caldwell, Horman)	Produced by Danny!		1:32
9.	"Strange Fruit" (featuring Peace and 'Drea) (Hunter, Swain, Fukumura, Watanabe)	Produced by Danny!		4:03
10.	"What Now" (Swain, Hargreaves, Merkel, Munzer, Spirka)	Produced by Danny!		3:23
11.	"Move Somethin'" (featuring G. Test) (Edwards, Swain, Griffin)	Produced by Danny!	Contains samples from "Smog", by the Miracles.	4:07
12.	"My Problem" (Swain, Adams, Jordan)	Produced by Danny!		3:37
13.	"Carousel" (Swain, Kallio, Malm, Rantala)	Produced by Danny!		3:35
14.	"Lip Flappin'" (Goose, Swain, Hendricks, Jobim, Mendonça)		Contains elements from "One Note Samba", by Nancy Wilson.	3:47
15.	"You Owe Me" (Swain, Bell, Epstein)	Produced by Danny!		3:10
16.	"Where Were You" (featuring 'Drea) (Swain, Arthey, Cutugno, Delanoe, Losito, Pallavicini)	Produced by Danny!		4:50
17.	"No Guarantees (remix)" (featuring Jinx) (Dorrah, Swain, Hall)	Produced by Danny!	Contains samples from "Grounds For Separation", by Hall & Oates.	3:45
18.	"Fly" (featuring Peace) (Hunter, Swain, Garrett, Johnson, Johnson, Jones)	Produced by Danny!	Contains elements from "Tomorrow (A Better You, Better Me)", by Tevin Campbell and "Tomorrow" by The Brothers Johnson.	3:00
19.	"Cafe Surreal" (Swain, Abou-Chanab, Carboni, O'Donoghue)	Produced by Danny!		4:00
20.	"Rise & Shine (interlude)" (Swain, Butler, Lindsay)	Produced by Danny!		2:13
21.	"Now You're Gone" (Edwards, Swain, Holland, Dozier, Holland, Johnson)		Contains elements from "Since I Fell For You", by Laura Lee.	3:40

== Credits ==
- Danny! – executive producer, producer, composer, Featured Vocals
- Alex Goose – producer
- Guleus "G. Test" Edwards – Featured Vocals, Producer
- Angela "Peace" Hunter – Featured Vocals
- Andrea Boutte – Featured Vocals
- Christopher "Jinx" Dorrah – Featured Vocals
