= Payback (album) =

Studio album by Danny!
- Released: September 25, 2012
- Genre: Hip hop
- Length: 81:23
- Label: Okayplayer
- Producer: Danny!

Danny! chronology
Where Is Danny? (2011)	Payback (2012)	The Book of Daniel (2018)

Payback is the seventh studio album of American rapper/producer Danny Swain, released under the name Danny!. The album was recorded primarily during the summer of 2011 shortly after Where Is Danny?'s re-release via Interscope Records. After leaving Interscope, Swain subsequently signed to Okayplayer Records, and the album was released in late September 2012.

Payback was promoted by an appearance by Swain on Late Night With Jimmy Fallon alongside the Roots one week prior to the record's release. The album includes featured performances by various recording artists, and one by actress Amber Tamblyn.

== Overview ==
=== Background ===
Shortly after Swain's previous album Where Is Danny? was re-released in 2011, Swain began to compose a satirical project to expose how listeners were more interested in music by high-profile names than in music of substance. Swain spent the remainder of 2011 assembling tracks intended for a digital download album to be released through Interscope. Swain left Interscope's digital label in late 2011 and was later picked up by Questlove's relaunched Okayplayer Records. Payback was largely ready by January 2012.

=== Release ===
Payback, narrated by Joi Gilliam, was revamped for release on September 25, 2012. All tracks were produced by Swain.

One week prior to the album's release, Swain performed "Evil" on Late Night with Jimmy Fallon with the Roots as his backing band.

=== Reception ===
Professional ratings
Review scores
Source	Rating
Allmusic	4/5 stars
Consequence of Sound	3.5/5 stars
DJ Booth	4/5 stars
HipHopDX	4/5 stars
No Ripcord	6/10 stars
Popmatters	8/10 stars
RapReviews	9/10 stars
Rolling Stone	3/5 stars
Slant Magazine	4/5 stars
SPIN	7/10 stars

Payback initially received mostly favorable reviews after being delivered to the press at the top of 2012, ultimately earning a 76% rating from review aggregator Metacritic leading up to its eventual fall release. Noting the album's scarcity and constant delays at the time, Popmatters praised Swain's candor as well as the cultural references scattered throughout the album, wondering "how much of the album’s more subversive elements could slip between the cracks at a time when the market behaves as though there’s simply no time or need for inspective ears".

The production on the album was unanimously acclaimed by critics; Slant Magazine deemed the beats "undeniably savvy". Sites such as AllMusic and DJ Booth lauded Swain's emotional purging throughout the record, with both likening Payback to an on-wax "catharsis", while others such as Rolling Stone and No Ripcord chided him for the very same thing, calling Swain "angry" on an album "[full] of gripes". Swain would later debunk the latter sentiments on his Tumblr blog track by track, dismissing the presentation of such notions as "lazy". Swain recanted this stance on his subsequent album, The Book Of Daniel, acknowledging that Payback was "cartoonishly entitled" and conceived during a "very, very dark time in [his] life".

== Track listing ==
All tracks are produced by Danny!. Credits adapted from AllMusic.

No.	Title	Writer(s)	Sample(s)	Length
1.	"Overture" (featuring Chell)	Daniel Swain; Piero Piccioni; Tomoyuki Tanaka		3:57
2.	"Myintrotoletuknow"	Swain; Artie Butler; Mark Lindsay	*"Amanda" by Dionne Warwick *"Are You That Somebody" by Aaliyah.	6:08
3.	"Little Black Boy" (featuring Res)	Swain; Zackery Bankhead; Robert Barnes; Samuel Jonathan Johnson		3:55
4.	"Get Up"	Swain; Amel Larrieux; Kaidi Tatham; Joy Jones	"Get Up" by Amel Larrieux.	5:21
5.	"Evil" (featuring Gavin Castleton and Amber Tamblyn)	Swain; Castleton; Tamblyn; Björk Guðmundsdóttir; Birgir Sigurðsson	*"Don't Know What to Tell Ya" by Aaliyah, "Hit Em wit da Hee" by Missy Elliott and "Jóga" by Björk.	6:21
6.	"Even Louder" (featuring Tanya Morgan and Swizz Beatz)	Swain; Devon Callender; Bob James; William Donald Freeman	*"Take Me to the Mardi Gras" by Bob James.	3:36
7.	"Phonte" (featuring Phonte)	Swain; Phonte Coleman	Contains elements from "Paul", by Eminem.	1:18
8.	"Shit Starters" (featuring Agallah and El-P)	Swain; Angel Aguilar; John Bush; Keith Grayson; Jaime Meline; Chris Minto; Dave Prichard; Joey Vera	*"Isolation" by Armored Saint *"Sibling Rivalry" by The Simpsons.	4:21
9.	"Overture Reprise" (featuring Chell)	Swain; Piccioni		4:43
10.	"Speed"	Swain; Steve Gray		3:56
11.	"Go That-A-Way"	Swain; Travis McCoy; Franklyn Smith; Tanaka		3:16
12.	"Misunderstood" (featuring Lil B and Blu)	Swain; Brandon McCartney; Johnson Barnes III; Gray	*"Get On the Bus" by Destiny's Child	5:15
13.	"I Don't Wanna Hear That Shit [Remix]" (featuring 'Sup Boo)	Swain; Anne Dudley; Manuel Göttsching; Trevor Horn; J.J. Jeczalik; Gary Langan; Paul Morley; Francis Rimbert		4:34
14.	"Do It All Over Again" (featuring Questlove)	Swain; Guy Boyer; Jean-Yves Thibaudet; Ahmir Thompson	*"Border Line" by The Soul City Orchestra *"C.R.E.A.M." by Wu-Tang Clan.	10:36
15.	"Keep Your Head To The Sky" (featuring Collette)	Swain; Gary Hines; James Harris III; Terry Lewis	*"Optimistic" by Sounds of Blackness.	6:20
16.	"Far Away" (featuring Collette)	Swain; Quincy Jones; Ivan Lins; Gilson Peranzzetta	*"Setembro (Brazilian Wedding Song)" by Take 6.	3:42
17.	"Payback" (featuring iLLmont)	Swain; Khalil Amir; Kwame Brewton; Von Concepcion; Lee Jones; Max Pengelly; Ian Thacker; Allen Thomas; Ibrahim Turay	*"It's a Terrible Thing to Waste Your Love" by The Masqueraders	4:04

Turkish Bonus Tracks
No.	Title	Writer(s)	Length
18.	"Been Away Too Long"	Swain	6:04
