= Danny! =

American musician (born 1983)

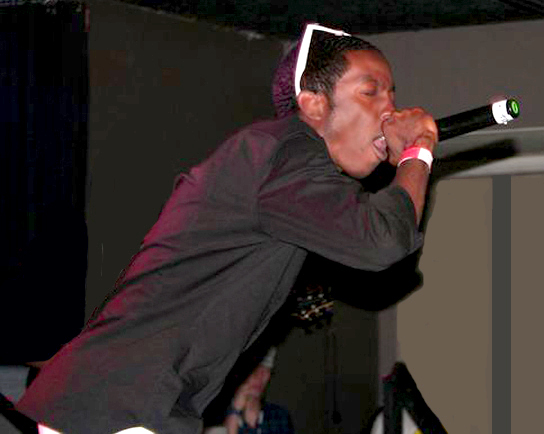
- Danny! opening for Drake in Atlanta, 2009

Background information
- Also known as: D. Swain; The College Kicked-Out
- Born: Daniel Swain; August 18, 1983 (age 42)
- Genres: Alternative hip-hop; underground hip-hop
- Occupations: Rapper; record producer; singer; composer; voice actor
- Years active: 2004–present
- Labels: Interscope, Definitive Jux
- Website: dannyswain.com

Daniel Swain (born August 18, 1983), known mononymously as Danny!, is an American rapper, record producer, singer, and composer.

Swain rose to prominence after his debut performance on Late Night with Jimmy Fallon, where he premiered his song "Evil". After joining Okayplayer Records, Swain released his album Payback, cited by AllMusic as one of the best hip-hop releases of the year. In 2013, Ebony magazine listed Swain among other rising artists in its "Leaders of the New School" piece, calling Swain one of a handful of "innovators".

Swain has composed background music that has since been placed in numerous motion pictures and television programs, most notably FOX's animated series Bob's Burgers for which Swain was awarded an Emmy plaque for his contributions to an episode that won in the Outstanding Animated Program category at the 69th Primetime Emmy Awards in 2017. In the year preceding this milestone, Swain also began working as a voiceover artist—debuting as the narrator of Hey Rookie, Welcome To The NFL's fifteenth season—and appeared in a digital short for Sesame Street featuring a "Wheels On The Bus" remix produced and performed by Swain.

== Early life ==
Swain, the only son of military parents, was born in Killeen, Texas and moved to Columbia, South Carolina, as a teenager. He attended Richland Northeast High School and began pursuing music as a hobby during his second year. Swain started penning his own lyrics and recorded songs as a showcase for his production.

== Career ==
=== 2004–2006: Early beginnings, Charm and instrumental albums ===
After spending nearly a year networking with local artists, Swain released his debut mixtape The College Kicked-Out. The record received mixed to unfavorable reviews—an up-and-coming Charlamagne tha God was among Kicked-Out's critics, panning the mixtape on air while working as a local radio station personality—which Swain would allude to in much of his later work.

Shortly after Kicked-Out's release Swain was accepted to the Savannah College of Art & Design and accordingly relocated to Savannah, Georgia. It was here that he began to work on his second project, F.O.O.D. The following year Swain officially released his third mixtape Charm, which was notable for featuring an underlying theme of escapism in its narrative of a musician who wants success in music to take him away from his day-to-day routine.

During this time Swain compiled an instrumental album, Dream, Interrupted, in an effort to promote his production; within two years the sequels Dream, Fulfilled and Dream, Extinguished would also be released.

It's all people telling you to do this and that…[but] when you do what they say and it still doesn't work in your favor, it's like, 'well, I was fine the way I was'. You just got to keep moving. There's no guarantee for anything.

—
Swain, on instinct and perseverance
(GQ, 2014)

=== 2007–2011: MTV, And I Love H.E.R. and Interscope era ===
After Charm, Swain received his first big break when MTV played a role in securing him a recording contract with Definitive Jux, an independent music label, at the time helmed by El-P of Run the Jewels fame. The record deal allowed Swain to release an album through the label, promoting it with a 12" single and accompanying music video slated for an exclusive premiere on mtvU. Though the label's involvement would not amount to a released album—only the single "Just Friends", which charted on the Billboard Hot 100—the deal did establish an ongoing relationship between Swain and MTV, which began using his music extensively in various programs.

Swain self-released his debut album, the faux-soundtrack And I Love H.E.R. The album was cited at the time by publications such as Pitchfork, LA Weekly and ABC News as one of the best releases of the year. And I Love H.E.R. was also notable for introducing another musical direction for Swain, who was experimenting with hip house, downtempo and lounge/electronica to produce a sort of "lounge-hop" hybrid.

Following And I Love H.E.R.'s success, Swain completed the Where Is Danny? album. Interscope Records, through its short-lived digital distribution program, distributed a revamped version of the album on iTunes.

=== 2012–present: Breakthrough, music licensing and The Book of Daniel ===
After the release of his third studio LP Payback, the title track of Swain's previous album was featured in a commercial for Sonos wireless speakers. Swain signed on as a composer for MTV's internal Hype Music label (later absorbed into Sony/ATV's Extreme Music production music library) and slowly transitioned into a producer role, landing instrumental placements with various Viacom television programming as well as commercials for Nordstrom, McDonald's, and incidental music for Bob's Burgers and its soundtrack, The Bob's Burgers Music Album.

In 2014, Swain started working on a new album, initially titled Deliverance, but later changed to The Book Of Daniel after the book in the Bible. During the album's development Swain appeared in Sesame Street's "Party Bus" video, which featured an original remix of "The Wheels on the Bus" composed by Swain. He also began working as a voiceover artist, narrating a season of Hey Rookie, Welcome to the NFL in 2016 for ESPN. The following year Swain was awarded an Emmy plaque from the Academy of Television Arts & Sciences for his musical contributions to the Bob's Burgers episode "Bob Actually" (Outstanding Animated Program, 2017), composing music for three scenes.

In 2015, a tracklist for The Book of Daniel was revealed at Swain's website. The album debut was announced for February 29, 2016, but it was not released. Another scheduled date, October 31, 2018, passed without the album release.

Despite a halt in studio releases, Swain continues to contribute to Bob's Burgers while composing library music and incidental cues under various aliases for Extreme Music.

== Discography ==
=== Studio albums ===
- And I Love H.E.R.: Original Motion Picture Soundtrack
- Where Is Danny?
- Payback
- The Book Of Daniel

=== Instrumental albums ===
- Dream, Interrupted
- Dream, Fulfilled
- Dream, Extinguished

=== Production credits ===
Artist	Song(s)	Album	Year
Danny Brown	"Exotic", "The Nana Song"	The Hybrid	2010
Danny Brown	"Counterfeit", "Hey!"*	Detroit State of Mind 4	2010
Lil B	"The Game On Lock", "Illusions of G"	Illusions of Grandeur 2	2012
Wale	"Never Never Freestyle"	Folarin	2012
Cody ChesnuTT	"Scroll Call (Danny Swain Remix)"	Landing on a Hundred: B-Sides & Remixes	2014

=== Film and television placements/credits ===
Song(s)	Where Featured	Network	Year
"Intermission (interlude)"	Jersey Shore After Hours	MTV	2008
"Cafe Surreal"	aMTV promotional bumper	MTV	2009
"Ebony Flower"	Wainy Days	My Damn Channel	2009
"Check It Out"	Disaster Date	MTV	2011
"The Groove"	Dina's Party	HGTV	2011
"The Groove"	Love Lust	SundanceTV	2011
"The Groove"	2011 Comedy Awards	Comedy Central	2011
"Cafe Surreal", "The Groove"	Red Bull Signature Series: Supernatural	NBC	2012
"Cafe Surreal"	The Association	ESPN	2012
"Crasy Sound"	Elbow Room	HGTV	2012
"Evil"	live performance on Late Night with Jimmy Fallon	NBC	2012
"God Bless The Child"	Breaking Amish	TLC	2012
"Loser"	Breaking Amish: Extended Episodes	TLC	2012
"Misery"	Rockstar Presents: XDurance Series (with Rob Adelberg)	YouTube	2012
"Pineapple Gumdrop"	LXTV 1st Look	NBC	2012
"Still Standing"	Life After: Karyn White	TV One	2012
"Where Is Danny", "I Ain't The Walrus"	Sonos television advert	cable	2012
"Cafe Surreal"	Crown Royal: Best Of promotional clip during 2013 NBA Playoffs	TNT	2013
"Malice In Blunderland"	The Challenge: Rivals II	MTV	2013
"Man On The Moon"	Snooki & Jwoww	MTV	2013
"One Day It'll All Make Cents"	The Show with Vinny	MTV	2013
"Torture"	World of Jenks	MTV	2013
"Gibraltar (Danny!'s Pride And Vanity Remix)"	Just Blaze interview	Okayplayer	2014
"Check It Out"	Nordstrom anniversary sale summer promo	cable and radio	2014
"Take Me To The Muddy Grass"	"Work Hard or Die Trying, Girl" episode of Bob's Burgers	FOX	2014
"The Wheels On The Bus"	"Party Bus" segment on Sesame Street	PBS, HBO, YouTube	2016
"Gangsta's Pair o' Dice", "Breakdance Bugaloo", "Walk Like This, No No Like This"	"Bob Actually" episode of Bob's Burgers	FOX	2017

== See also ==
- Alternative hip-hop
- List of former Interscope Records artists
- List of Sony/ATV Music Publishing artists
