= The College Kicked-Out =

Studio album by Danny!
- Released: November 2, 2004
- Recorded: September 2004
- Genre: Hip-Hop
- Length: 57:31
- Label: Badenov Records/1911 Music
- Producer: Danny!

Danny! chronology
The College Kicked-Out (2004)	F.O.O.D. (2005)

The College Kicked-Out is the debut album from American rapper/producer Danny! Originally slated for an October 12 release date, The College Kicked-Out finally saw the light of day on November 2 after being delayed by bootlegging.

== Overview ==
Both the album's cover art and title are a tongue-in-cheek reference to the 2003 grade-altering controversy at Claflin University that resulted in Danny! being accused of not only orchestrating the entire operation, but of accumulating a substantial amount of money from tampering with the institution's academic records; Danny! was subsequently expelled. The College Kicked-Out was just twelve days shy of being released an approximate year after Danny!'s expulsion from the university.

Contrary to the title, the album never actually gives any insight to the events leading up to Danny!'s expulsion from Claflin; rather, The College Kicked-Out is, at face value, a formulaic hip-hop record (Danny! slyly references such a formula at the beginning of "Second Time Around", proclaiming it his "obligatory [club] track") with much of its content being self-referential. The album showcased sole production from Danny!, establishing him as a notable producer from South Carolina; The College Kicked-Out was also significant for not featuring any guest appearances, making Danny!'s debut record a completely solo effort.

The album was the first record of many to come to be released under the 1911 Music/Badenov Records imprint which, according to Danny!, is a record label in name only. The "1911" is a reference to the year Kappa Alpha Psi, a fraternity he joined at Claflin, was founded and "Badenov" is obviously homage paid to Boris Badenov, an antagonist from Jay Ward's Rocky & Bullwinkle series of which Danny! is an avid fan.

=== Reception ===
Professional ratings
Review scores
Source	Rating
AllMusic	3.5/5 stars

The College Kicked-Out was initially met with mixed reviews. Retrospectively, music critics have gone on to say that though The College Kicked-Out is neither a masterpiece nor Danny!'s definitive album, it is a "pretty solid debut" overall.

The album not only helped establish Danny!'s freewheeling and emotional persona (a sharp contrast from the cynical and extremely sarcastic characteristics he would reveal on subsequent albums), but also helped reiterate the ethic of DIY used by many emerging underground hip-hop artists at the time, such as Little Brother, Lupe Fiasco and Tanya Morgan, who too would see moderate popularity on the Internet translate into a recording contract with major or independent record labels.

=== Availability ===
Due to the lack of a sufficient budget, only a few hundred copies of The College Kicked-Out were initially pressed up. The record was available only on CD and the original copies—complete with liner notes that featured both sample information and phony album credits (for example, sample clearance services are credited to a Hugh Jazfynes, a pun on hip-hop artists having to pay "huge-ass fines" should they get sued for failure to clear samples)—are very rare and are now considered collector's items. The College Kicked-Out has since been pirated in the wake of Danny!'s recent success—namely, his signing to Definitive Jux, Interscope Records and later Okayplayer—making legitimate copies that much more difficult to authenticate.

Following the unfavorable reaction to The College Kicked-Out at the time, Danny! recorded a bonus song, "Clap Back", and added the track to the second and final pressing of the album in December 2004. "Clap Back" is the only song on either edition of The College Kicked-Out to directly address the grade-changing incident at his former alma mater and is considered the "bridge", in terms of artistic direction, between Danny!'s debut album and its follow-up, the darker and more scathing F.O.O.D. Versions of The College Kicked-Out with "Clap Back" included are extremely rare.

== Track listing ==
No.	Title	Music	Sample(s)	Length
1.	"Intro" (Swain, Davis, Record)	Produced by Danny!	Contains samples from "The Coldest Days of My Life", by The Chi-Lites.	1:59
2.	"I Need A Publicist" (Swain, Scales)	Produced by Danny!	Contains elements from "It Ain't Rainin' (On Nobody's House But Mine)", by The Dramatics.	3:01
3.	"Stay Away" (Swain, Sylvers)	Produced by Danny!	Contains samples from "Stay Away From Me", by The Sylvers.	4:11
4.	"I'm Movin' Out" (Swain, Joel)	Produced by Danny!	Contains samples from "Movin' Out (Anthony's Song)", by Billy Joel.	4:23
5.	"Talk To You (remix)" (Swain, Goodman, Jarreau, Kuramato, Morris, Ray)	Produced by Danny!	Contains samples from "Shinto", by Hiroshima and "What's Your Name?", by The Moments.	4:22
6.	"D.A.N.N.Y." (Swain, Clinton)	Produced by Danny!	Contains elements from "She Is My Lady", by Donny Hathaway.	4:13
7.	"Can't Nobody" (Swain, Jones)	Produced by Danny!	Contains samples from "Can't Nobody Love Me Like You Do", by The Masqueraders.	4:24
8.	"My Baby" (Swain, Gaye, Greene, G. Gordy-Fuqua)	Produced by Danny!	Contains elements from "Distant Lover", by Marvin Gaye.	3:39
9.	"Second Time Around" (Swain, Webb)	Produced by Danny!	Contains elements from "Didn't We", by Irene Reid.	3:00
10.	"Grateful" (Swain, Gaye, Townsend)	Produced by Danny!	Contains samples from "If I Should Die Tonight", by Marvin Gaye.	3:22
11.	"When You Get There" (Swain, Franklin)	Produced by Danny!	Contains samples from "Call Me", by Aretha Franklin.	3:56
12.	"I Wish" (Swain, Sylvers)	Produced by Danny!	Contains elements from "Cry Of A Dreamer", by The Sylvers.	3:56
13.	"My Way" (Swain, Anka, François, Revaux)	Produced by Danny!	Contains samples from "My Way", by Irene Reid.	4:07
14.	"No Guarantees" (Swain, Hall)	Produced by Danny!	Contains elements from "Grounds For Separation", by Hall & Oates.	4:25

== Bonus track ==
- "Clap Back" (available on the second U.S. pressing), 3:55

== Credits ==
- Danny! – executive producer, producer, composer, Featured Vocals
- Steve Slavich – engineer
