= The Bugs Bunny Mystery Special =

1980 American TV special

- Directed by: Gerry Chiniquy; Friz Freleng; Chuck Jones
- Starring: Mel Blanc (voices)
- Theme music composer: Harper MacKay
- Country of origin: United States
- Original language: English

Production
- Producer: Hal Geer
- Running time: 24 minutes

Original release
- Network: CBS
- Release: October 15, 1980

The Bugs Bunny Mystery Special is an animated television special that was broadcast on CBS October 15, 1980. Presented by Porky Pig as an Alfred Hitchcock-style whodunit, the plot is modeled after those of North by Northwest and The Fugitive.

Like most Looney Tunes specials of the time, this program consists of clips from classic cartoons with some new original animation holding them together.

== Plot synopsis ==
A criminal known as the Tall, Dark Stranger robs a bank, and Inspector Elmer Fudd mistakenly arrests Bugs Bunny for the crime. Escaping from jail, Bugs sets out to prove his innocence while evading Elmer, who is searching for him after his escape. Soon word spreads about Bugs Bunny being a national fugitive. When a reward gets placed on his head "eaten or alive", this inspires Wile E. Coyote to hunt him down, and Elmer hires former prison guard Yosemite Sam (who got fired for letting Bugs escape after the former having been antagonized by the latter during his time at prison) as a bounty hunter. However, Bugs outsmarts both Wile E. and Sam in different ways until Wile E. gives up and Elmer fires Sam, leaving Elmer as the only one who keeps pursuing him.

After some chases and a side story involving Tweety and Sylvester, Bugs ends up dangling from the beak of a Mount Rushmore-sized sculpture of Foghorn Leghorn; he is rescued by the Tall, Dark Stranger, who turns out to be Porky Pig (he was trying to keep the story going), as Bugs remarks "I could've sworn the butler did it!" Porky is arrested and concludes the special from inside a jail cell by saying his "T-t-t-t-that's all, Folks" line.

== Cast ==
- Mel Blanc as Bugs Bunny, Elmer Fudd, Yosemite Sam, Tweety, Sylvester, Wile E. Coyote, Porky Pig and Taxi Radio Announcer.

== Credits ==
Directed by Gerry Chiniquy, Friz Freleng and Chuck Jones.

== Cartoons featured ==
- Bugs and Thugs (the opening scene where Bugs walks to the bank while reading the newspaper)
- Baby Buggy Bunny (the scene where the bank is robbed)
- Big House Bunny
- Operation: Rabbit
- Compressed Hare
- All a Bir-r-r-rd (the Tweety and Sylvester subplot)
- Catty Cornered (the newspaper montage and the ending scene)
- Hare Lift (the scene where Yosemite Sam robs the Last National Bank is replaced with Elmer offering him a bounty of a large sum of money if Sam can find Bugs and arrest him; the scene where Sam threatens to shoot him if Bugs cannot help him escape is replaced with Sam ordering him to "fly us back to Sing-Song Prison"; and the scene where Sam ends up parachuting into a police car of officers is replaced with Elmer flying toward Sam and telling him that he did a "wotten" job before taking the bounty money back and firing him)

== Availability ==
This special has been released on VHS videocassette, but not on DVD.
