= Special Delivery (TV series) =

- Narrated by: Bill St. James (1984–1993)
- Country of origin: United States
- No. of seasons: 15
- No. of episodes: 404 (809 Total)

Production
- Running time: 30 minutes–2 hours
- Production company: Various

Original release
- Network: Nickelodeon
- Release: April 6, 1980 – September 13, 1993

Related
- 16 Cinema; Nick Jr. Storytime

Special Delivery is an American anthology series on Nickelodeon, broadcast during weekend afternoons from 1980 until 1993, when the network's original programming output was deemed sufficient to discontinue the block. Special Delivery mainly carried a variety of productions for children purchased by Nickelodeon, including both live-action and animated programming. Much of this programming was made up of children-focused made-for-TV movies produced in Canada in the 1970s and 80s, short films originally made for the ABC Afterschool Special and CBS Schoolbreak Special anthology series, sports specials (often with the time purchased from Nickelodeon by the event's distributors), and some unsold television pilots adapted to an hour-long timeslot.

From 1987 to 1989, 16 Cinema, which aired specials targeted towards teenagers, aired an hour after Special Delivery on Sundays. Several half-hour Special Delivery episodes plus new specials aired on weekdays as Nickelodeon Lunch Break Theater (in the summer of 1992), Nick Jr. Lunchbreak Theater (from late 1992 to April 1993), and Nick Jr. Storytime (from April 1993 to June 1995).

== Overview ==
Presentations on Special Delivery were varied in focus and origin. A May 1984 issue of Boys' Life referred to the programs shown on Special Delivery as "fill-in shows" compared to the rest of Nickelodeon's lineup. Most programs were aimed at family audiences, but in an attempt to emulate the success of sister network MTV, Nickelodeon occasionally aired rock-and-roll concerts as part of the block. The earliest known Special Delivery broadcast was a Rick Derringer concert aired in April 1980. According to a March 1983 interview with Nickelodeon's acquisitions manager Eileen Opatut, potential acquisitions for the series were tested in schools before being chosen to air.

== Episodes ==
Title	Airdate	Reference
Rick Derringer in Concert	April 6, 1980	
Todd Rundgren Utopia Live	August 17, 1980	
Courage to Succeed	August 31, 1980	
The Little Fugitive	September 1, 1980	
The Day The Derby Almost Died	September 9, 1980	
Star City Roll Out	September 27, 1980	
Michel's Mixed-Up Musical Bird	October 12, 1980	
The Magical Mystery Trip Through Little Red's Head	November 9, 1980	
The International Children's Festival at Wolf Trap	November 27, 1980	
Mandy's Grandmother	December 10, 1980	
The Christmas Tree	December 21, 1980	
Jack Frost	December 24, 1980	
Hansel and Gretel	December 25, 1980	
On Stage At The Agora: The Eddie Money Show	January 24, 1981	
New England Regional Skating Championships	February 1, 1981	
On Stage At The Agora: Toto	February 6, 1981	
My Mom's Having a Baby	February 11, 1981	
The Red Balloon	February 14, 1981	
The Incredible, Indelible, Magical Physical, Mystery Trip	February 25, 1981	
Circles and Spins	March 18, 1981	
Portrait of Grandpa Doc	April 17, 1981	
Rudyard Kipling's Jungle Book	May 16, 1981	
Clever Jack	July 10, 1981	
Circus Town	August 9, 1981	
China Spectacular	August 15, 1981	
The Ransom of Red Chief	September 20, 1981; August 27, 1983	
We Are All One People	September 28, 1981	
The Darts in Concert	October 3, 1981	
I'll Find A Way	October 14, 1981	
The Police in Concert	October 17, 1981	
Beware, Beware, My Beauty Fair	October 30, 1981; July 23, 1983	
Robinson Crusoe	November 1, 1981	
David Johansen in Concert	November 6, 1981	
One Of A Kind	November 15, 1981	
Nikkolina	November 26, 1981	
A Gift to Last	December 24, 1981; December 25, 1982	
Marie Anne	January 1, 1982	
The World According to Nicholas	January 27, 1982	
Meeting Halfway	February 5, 1982	
Roger Daltrey: Ride A Rock Horse	February 14, 1982	
Danny	February 15, 1982	
Hello Symphony	February 20, 1982	
Wild Rides	March 17, 1982; October 7, 1984; April 6, 1985	
His Majesty, the Scarecrow of Oz	April 1, 1982	
The Adventures Of Dinosaur Badlands	April 4, 1982	
The Amazing Mr. Blunden	April 5, 1982	
The Velveteen Rabbit	April 9, 1982	
Clay Creatures	May 7, 1982	
End of the Game	May 17, 1982	
Big Apple Birthday	June 9, 1982	
Split Enz in Concert	June 11, 1982; January 1, 1983	
The Cars in Concert	July 2, 1982	
The American Hero Show	July 3, 1982	
Santa Fe Trail	July 7, 1982	
The Stowaway	July 10, 1982	
Let the Balloon Go	August 7, 1982	
Alex and the Wonderful Doo Wah Lamp	September 12, 1982	
The Water Babies	October 11, 1982	
Tuck Everlasting	November 25, 1982; August 31, 1985	
ELO In Concert In Wembley	December 10, 1982	
Clarence and Angel	December 19, 1982; December 25, 1982	
Kävik the Wolf Dog	January 29, 1983	
Foghat	February 5, 1983	
Voice Of The Fugitive	February 13, 1983	
Clarence and the Ottaway	March 5, 1983; February 25, 1984	
Adam & the Ants: The Prince Charming Revue	March 12, 1983	
Silver City	April 9, 1983; April 30, 1983; July 23, 1983	
A Special Place	April 30, 1983	
Quarterflash	May 1, 1983	
Gulliver's Travels	June 4, 1983	
Duran Duran in Concert	June 11, 1983; February 26, 1984	
Haircut 100 in Concert	June 26, 1983; February 26, 1984	
Talk Talk And Depeche Mode In Concert	July 2, 1983	
Avengers of the Reef	July 9, 1983	
Someday, Sometime	July 16, 1983	
Altered Images	August 13, 1983	
On My Own	August 27, 1983	
Star Chart	September 3, 1983	
School Daze ("Louis James Hates School"/"Miss Nelson Is Missing!")	September 25, 1983; April 15, 1984	
Aladdin	October 9, 1983	
Introducing Janet	November 6, 1983	
Raisins and Almonds	December 3, 1983	
The Nutcracker	December 11, 1983	
English Beat In Concert	January 8, 1984; April 15, 1984	
One Last Ride	January 8, 1984; October 7, 1984	
UFO Kidnapped	January 14, 1984; November 30, 1985	
Wings in the Wilderness	February 5, 1984	
Ants In Japan: Adam Ant in Concert	February 26, 1984	
Mariposa	March 3, 1984; October 6, 1984	
A Time To Be Brave (Spirit Bay)	April 7, 1984; April 15, 1984	
Bob Welch and Friends	April 14, 1984	
Saga	April 15, 1984	
BMX World Championships	May 5, 1984; February 2, 1985; June 8, 1986; October 4, 1987	
The Get Along Gang (pilot)	May 6, 1984	
Cody	June 10, 1984	
Kansas in Concert	July 8, 1984	
Rolex Junior Tennis Championships	July 14, 1984; July 6, 1985	
Atomic Legs	September 2, 1984	
The Raccoons: Let's Dance!	October 6, 1984; March 3, 1985; March 16, 1985	
The Boy Who Couldn't Lose	October 6, 1984; August 25, 1985	
Thompson Twins	October 27, 1984	
The Americanization of Elias	November 17, 1984	
Mighty Moose and the Quarterback Kid	November 17, 1984; March 3, 1985; March 16, 1985; September 1, 1985	
Joshua's Confusion	December 2, 1984	
The Snowman	December 15, 1984	
Doctor Snuggles	January 5, 1985	
Brother Tough	January 12, 1985	
In the Fall	January 13, 1985; March 17, 1985	
The Adventures of Marco Polo Jr.	January 19, 1985; September 28, 1985	
Andrew	February 9, 1985	
Rosie	February 10, 1985	
Sometimes I Wonder	March 9, 1985	
Escape of a One-Ton Pet	March 10, 1985	
Just Another Stupid Kid	March 16, 1985	
Do Me A Favor... Don't Vote For My Mom	March 17, 1985; November 30, 1985	
Witch's Sister	April 6, 1985; October 12, 1985	
The Magic Laser	April 7, 1985; July 13, 1985	
Black Magic	April 13, 1985	
Grandma Didn't Wave Back	April 14, 1985	
Backstreet Six	May 4, 1985	
Huck Finn	May 12, 1985	
Hobie's Heroes	June 2, 1985; September 22, 1985	
Road To The Stars	July 14, 1985	
Just An Overnight Guest	June 9, 1985; September 1, 1985	
Keiko	August 3, 1985; August 25, 1985	
The Fixx in Concert	August 25, 1985	
Kids in Performance	September 3, 1985	
Welcome to Miami, Cubanos	September 8, 1985; September 28, 1985	
The Boy Who Never Was	September 21, 1985	
The Mystery at Castle House	September 22, 1985	
Mr. Gimme	September 29, 1985	
Lassie: A New Beginning	October 1, 1985	
The Magic of Lassie	October 5, 1985	
Who Spooked Rodney?	October 12, 1985	
The Mystery of the Million Dollar Hockey Puck	November 2, 1985	
A Merry Mirthworm Christmas	December 1, 1985	
Benji's Very Own Christmas Story	December 1, 1985	
Today's Special: Live On Stage	December 1, 1985	
Little Lord Fauntleroy	December 7, 1985	
Raggedy Ann & Andy: A Musical Adventure	January 4, 1986	
Stanley, the Ugly Duckling	January 5, 1986	
The Witches and the Grinnygog	January 12, 1986	
Snowbound	February 1, 1986	
The Tap Dance Kid	February 2, 1986	
My Mother Was Never a Kid	February 8, 1986	
The Incredible Book Escape	March 1, 1986	
A Movie Star's Daughter	March 1, 1986	
The Magic of Doctor Snuggles	March 9, 1986	
Rabbit Pulls His Weight (Spirit Bay)	March 9, 1986	
Revenge of the Humanoids	March 15, 1986	
The Little Princess	April 5, 1986	
The Seven Wishes of a Rich Kid	April 6, 1986	
The Treasure of Alpheus T. Winterborn	April 6, 1986	
Starstruck	May 3, 1986; November 23, 1986	
Big Henry and the Polka Dot Kid	May 11, 1986; November 22, 1986	
Zoom the White Dolphin	May 17, 1986	
BMX: Win With The Pros	June 8, 1986	
The Brave Frog's Greatest Adventure	June 14, 1986	
A Tale of Two Cities	July 5, 1986	
David Copperfield	August 2, 1986	
Misunderstood Monsters	August 10, 1986; November 22, 1986; June 28, 1987	
Little Women	September 6, 1986	
Rabbit Goes Fishing (Spirit Bay)	September 12, 1986	
Red Shoes	October 4, 1986; June 28, 1987	
Raggedy Ann and Andy in The Pumpkin Who Couldn't Smile	October 4, 1986	
The Great Bear Scare	October 12, 1986	
The Haunting of Harrington House	November 1, 1986; November 23, 1986; June 27, 1987	
Raggedy Ann and Andy in The Great Santa Claus Caper	December 6, 1986	
Santa's Pocket Watch	December 6, 1986	
Chocky	December 13, 1986	
Abra Cadabra	January 10, 1987	
Dinky Hocker	January 11, 1987	
Children's Island	January 17, 1987	
The Courage of Rin Tin Tin	February 7, 1987	
Talking Animal	February 7, 1987; June 27, 1987	
Collared	February 8, 1987	
Peking Circus	February 15, 1987	
Sunkist Junior Invitational Track Meet	March 1, 1987; March 12, 1988	
Prince and the Great Race	March 7, 1987	
Really Rosie	March 7, 1987	
The Wrong Way Kid	March 8, 1987	
The Empty Chair	April 5, 1987	
Minors	April 11, 1987	
Umpire	April 11, 1987	
National Junior Freestyle Championship	April 26, 1987	
Pick Up Your Feet: The Double Dutch Show	May 2, 1987	
Gulliver's Travels	May 9, 1987	
Words On A Page (Spirit Bay)	May 12, 1987	
Hot News (Spirit Bay)	June 13, 1987; June 28, 1987	
Somewhere Else	June 14, 1987; June 27, 1987	
A Real Kid (Spirit Bay)	July 4, 1987	
Look at Me	July 12, 1987	
Back To School	September 5, 1987	
Cadichon	September 13, 1987	"Cadichon" (September 13, 1987); "Cadichon II" (October 11, 1987); "Cadichon III" (January 2, 1988); "Cadichon IV" (March 5, 1988)
Chocky's Children	October 10, 1987	
NEC World Youth Cup	October 17, 1987	
Three Tramps	October 17, 1987	
The Little Fox	November 7, 1987	
The Kelly School Annual Turkey Raffle
The Pinballs	November 8, 1987	
Uncle Marvin	November 8, 1987	
Alice's Adventures in Wonderland (1981)	November 14, 1987	
Snow Treasure (1967)	November 15, 1987	
Trouble River	December 5, 1987	
White Lies	December 5, 1987	
Oliver and the Artful Dodger	December 6, 1987	
The Prince and the Pauper	December 12, 1987	
Jack and the Beanstalk	December 13, 1987	
Cyrano	January 2, 1988	
Master of the World	January 3, 1988	
Gaucho	January 16, 1988	
USSA National Freestyle Ski Championship	January 16, 1988	
Pop Warner Football Superbowl	January 31, 1988	
The Mysterious Island	February 6, 1988	
Psst! Hammerman's After You!	February 7, 1988	
Big Save (Spirit Bay)	February 7, 1988	
Danny's Egg	February 7, 1988	
Moon Madness	March 5, 1988	
The Blueberry Bicycle (Spirit Bay)	March 12, 1988	
Swiss Family Robinson	March 13, 1988	
Summer Switch	April 2, 1988	
Hack's Choice (Spirit Bay)	April 3, 1988	
Socko AFA Freestyle Masters	April 9, 1988	
A Home Run For Love	April 9, 1988	
Sharon, Lois & Bram: Downtown	April 10, 1988	
Moby Dick	May 8, 1988	
The Contest	May 8, 1988	
Dynaman	May 14, 1988	
Water Magic (Spirit Bay)	May 15, 1988	
Sara's Summer of the Swans	May 15, 1988	
Cuckoo Land	June 5, 1988	
P.J. and the President's Son	June 19, 1988	
Hewitt's Just Different	July 3, 1988	
Theresa at the Palace	July 10, 1988	
The Secret Life of T. K. Dearing	July 16, 1988	
Fat Chance	July 17, 1988	
The Amazing Cosmic Awareness of Duffy Moon	July 30, 1988	
Me and Dad's New Wife	August 7, 1988	
The Red Balloon	August 13, 1988	
The Horrible Honchos	August 20, 1988	
The Electric Grandmother	September 3, 1988	
The Hand-Me-Down Kid	September 3, 1988	
The Fabulous Adventures of Baron Von Munchausen	September 11, 1988	
Animal Talk	October 2, 1988	
The Story of Heidi	October 8, 1988	
The Crown of Bogg	October 15, 1988	
A Family of Strangers	November 6, 1988	
Luke Was There	November 6, 1988	
The Fir Tree	November 20, 1988	
The Kelly School Annual Heart-Throb Ball	February 5, 1989	
The Kelly School Annual Picnic	April 2, 1989	
The Gnomes' Great Adventure	April 2, 1989	
A Very Merry Cricket	December 10, 1988	
The Snow Queen (1981)	December 10, 1988	
The Box of Delights	December 11, 1988	
Grimm's Fairy Tale Classics	January 7, 1989	
A Cricket in Times Square	February 11, 1989	
The Three Musketeers	March 5, 1989	
An Easter Story	March 11, 1989	
The Great Gilly Hopkins	April 9, 1989	
20,000 Leagues Under the Sea	May 6, 1989	
The Train Mice	May 6, 1989	
Davy Crockett on the Mississippi	June 10, 1989	
Yankee Doodle Cricket	July 1, 1989	
A Far Out Fourth	July 2, 1989	
Mirthworms on Stage	July 22, 1989	
The Zertigo Diamond Caper	August 6, 1989	
Have You Ever Been Ashamed of Your Parents?	August 6, 1989	
It Isn't Easy Being a Teenage Millionaire	August 12, 1989	
Eureeka's Castle	August 27, 1989	
The Count of Monte Cristo	September 2, 1989	
Black Beauty	September 9, 1989	
Young American Bowling Alliance Championship Tournament	September 17, 1989	
Lisa Gets the Picture	October 1, 1989	
A Thanksgiving Tale	November 12, 1989	
All-American Soap Box Derby	November 12, 1989; November 4, 1990	
Santa's Magic Toy Bag	December 9, 1989	
The Kids of Degrassi Street	December 10, 1989	
Mowgli's Brothers	January 6, 1990	
The White Seal	January 6, 1990	
Rikki-Tikki-Tavi	February 10, 1990	
Night of the Red Hunter	March 10, 1990	
Peter Pan	March 17, 1990	
Around the World in 80 Days	April 1, 1990	
Wind in the Willows	April 14, 1990	
Friendliest and Funniest Fish in the Sea	May 5, 1990	
Sharon, Lois & Bram: Live in Your Living Room	June 2, 1990	
Sharon, Lois & Bram: Back by Popular Demand	June 2, 1990	
AYSO Championships	September 2, 1990	
Manxmouse	September 9, 1990	
Peter of Placid Forest	September 15, 1990	
Junior Olympics	October 7, 1990	
Pardon Me for Living	October 13, 1990	
Babe Ruth Baseball Championships	October 13, 1990	
The Adventures of Tom Sawyer	December 1, 1990	
The Light Brigade	December 1, 1990	
Treasure Island	January 5, 1991	
Lady and the Lion	February 3, 1991	
Ivanhoe	February 10, 1991	
The Nightingale	March 2, 1991	
The Tin Soldier	March 2, 1991	
The Disappearance	March 3, 1991	
The Wilder Summer	March 10, 1991	
Dr. Jekyll and Mr. Hyde	March 17, 1991	
Drawing a Blank	April 13, 1991	
The Velveteen Rabbit (Atkinson Film-Arts)	May 11, 1991	
The Moonstone Gem	May 12, 1991	
The Day My Kid Went Punk	June 8, 1991	
The Hunchback of Notre Dame	June 9, 1991	
Lassie's Great Adventure	August 3, 1991	
The Jungle Book (Saban)	August 18, 1991	
The Dog Days of Arthur Cane	September 8, 1991	
The New Misadventures of Ichabod Crane	October 5, 1991	
The Witch Who Turned Pink	October 5, 1991	
Lassie the Voyager	October 13, 1991	
Prisoner of Zenda	November 10, 1991	
Ziggy's Gift	December 1, 1991	
The Wizard of Oz	January 11, 1992	
Jack and the Beanstalk	January 11, 1992	
Snow White	February 8, 1992	
Sleeping Beauty	April 4, 1992	
Busch Gardens/SeaWorld Summer Safari	June 13, 1992	
Molly's Pilgrim	June 14, 1992	
The Greatest Little Show on Earth	July 5, 1992	
Harry the Dirty Dog	July 6, 1992	Originally aired on April 2, 1991.
Tales From The Whoop: Hot Rod Brown, Class Clown	July 7, 1992	Originally aired on October 20, 1990.
The Adventures of Pete & Pete: Space, Geeks, and Johnny Unitas	July 8, 1992	Originally aired on June 16, 1992.
Stories from Growing Up	July 9, 1992	Originally aired on February 23, 1991.
Cinderella	August 2, 1992	
Jungle Book	August 2, 1992	
Fair Game	August 2, 1992	
The Garden	October 4, 1992	
Johann's Gift to Christmas	December 5, 1992	
Gallavants	January 2, 1993	
His Master's Ghost	January 3, 1993	
Paper Camera	June 8, 1993	
Moccasin Flats	June 8, 1993	
Double Daniel	June 11, 1993	
Cutaway	June 11, 1993	
Thinking Big	July 12, 1993	
The Great Cheese Conspiracy	July 15, 1993	
Bill Body I	September 13, 1993	
Bill Body II	September 13, 1993	

=== 16 Cinema ===
Title	Airdate	Notes
Between Two Loves	October 11, 1987	Reran on Special Delivery on June 18, 1993.
She Drinks A Little	October 18, 1987	
Tough Girl	October 25, 1987	
It's a Mile From Here To Glory	November 1, 1987	Reran on Special Delivery on September 5, 1992.
A Matter of Time	November 8, 1987	
Introducing Janet	November 15, 1987	
Daddy, I'm Their Mama Now	November 22, 1987	Reran on Special Delivery on February 13, 1993.
Francesca, Baby	November 29, 1987	
The Heartbreak Winner: One Girl's Struggle For Olympic Gold	December 6, 1987	
Very Good Friends	December 13, 1987	
Dear Lovey Hart: I Am Desperate	December 20, 1987	Reran on Special Delivery on April 23, 1993.
A Special Gift	December 27, 1987	
The Skating Rink	January 3, 1988	Reran on Special Delivery on July 6, 1993.
The House at 12 Rose Street	May 8, 1988	
Mom and Dad Can't Hear Me	June 5, 1988	
Blind Sunday	July 3, 1988	
I Don't Know Who I Am	August 7, 1988	
The Alfred Graebner Memorial High School Handbook of Rules and Regulations	September 11, 1988	
Amy and the Angel	September 18, 1988	
It's No Crush, I'm In Love	October 2, 1988	
The Color of Friendship	October 16, 1988	
Out of Step	November 6, 1988	
Make-Believe Marriage	November 20, 1988	
A Very Delicate Matter	December 4, 1988	
Revenge of the Nerd	December 25, 1988	
The Terrible Secret	April 16, 1989	
Buchanan High School	May 7, 1989	Two episodes

=== Nickelodeon/Nick Jr. Lunchbreak Theater/Nick Jr. Storytime ===
Title	Airdate	Notes
Nickelodeon Wild Side Show	June 30, 1992	Pilot episode; aired on Special Delivery on July 10, 1992.
Little Sister Rabbit	July 2, 1992	
Nick's Thanksgiving Fest	November 26, 1992	Originally aired on November 22, 1989.
Nonsense and Lullabyes: Nursery Rhymes	January 5, 1993	
Rooster's Hamlet	January 6, 1993	
Anytime Tales	January 13, 1993	
Nonsense and Lullabyes: Poems	January 14, 1993	
Trollies Radio Show	February 3, 1993	
Lighthouse Island	April 26, 1993	
Making Music With Eric Nagler	June 7, 1993	
Oddlee	July 15, 1993	
Just So Stories	July 21, 1993	
Papa Beaver's Storytime	March 2, 1994	
Billy Bunny's Animal Songs	April 14, 1995	

== See also ==
- History of Nickelodeon
