= A Very Merry Cricket =

1973 animated television Christmas special

- Written by: Chuck Jones; George Selden
- Directed by: Chuck Jones
- Starring: Les Tremayne; Mel Blanc
- Music by: Dean Elliott
- Country of origin: United States
- Original language: English

Production
- Running time: 24 minutes

Original release
- Release: December 14, 1973

A Very Merry Cricket is a 1973 Christmas animated television special. It was directed by Chuck Jones. It originally aired on ABC on December 14, 1973. who also wrote the teleplay with George Selden. It was a sequel to their acclaimed adaptation of the 1960 book The Cricket in Times Square and was followed in 1975 by another sequel, Yankee Doodle Cricket.

The show included two original songs by Dean Elliott and Marian Dern (Jones' wife): "Christmas in New York" and "What If Humans Were More Like Mice?"

== Plot ==
During Christmastime in New York City, idealist Harry the Cat and wisenheimer Tucker the Mouse read Christmas stories as they hide in the sewers from the cantankerous, miserable, selfish and noisy humans of the city. They recall their friend Chester C. Cricket, who could play his wings like a violin and was reputed to have calmed a New York crowd with his playing. Chester has since moved to the fictional suburb of Sunnyslope, Connecticut, so Harry and Tucker go to visit him.

After Harry saves Tucker from becoming a Sunnyslope alley cat's Christmas dinner shortly after arrival, they reunite with Chester, who is giving a concert over the phone. He agrees to return to New York City but is skeptical that he is capable of reviving the New Yorkers' Christmas spirit; Harry and Tucker rouse him. After escaping the alley cat and an angry bulldog on the way out of Sunnyslope with Chester's help, the trio treks to Mains Crossing, where they barely catch the nearest train back to New York by a tree-bark "one-cat open sleigh."

Upon arriving in New York, and having a night's rest, Tucker begins planning Chester's set list, only for Chester to be overwhelmed by the noise, again doubting he could pull off such a monumental feat. Chester begins to play, but the sounds of the city prove to be deafening, too much for Chester's playing to be heard. As Tucker despairs the plan's failure, the city's power plant overloads, plunging the city into blackout, and the city suddenly goes silent, giving Chester his opening. Chester begins his concert: "Silent Night," "It Came Upon the Midnight Clear," and "Joy to the World."

== Availability ==
The special was released on VHS in 1985, in 1989 as part of the Christmas Classics Series, in 1992 on a Double Feature VHS also containing the Canadian Christmas special Bluetoes the Christmas Elf, and in 1999 by Family Home Entertainment. It was released on DVD for the first time with another Chuck Jones special, Mowgli's Brothers in 2005, and later as part of the Chuck Jones Collection DVD in 2007, both released by Lionsgate Home Entertainment.

== Cast ==
- Les Tremayne as Chester C. Cricket / Harry the Cat
- Mel Blanc as Tucker R. Mouse / Alley Cat
