= The Genie of Sutton Place =

1973 novel by George Selden

- First edition
- Author: George Selden
- Illustrator: Garth Williams
- Genre: Young Adult
- Publisher: Farrar, Straus & Giroux
- Publication date: March 15, 1973
- Publication place: United States
- Media type: Print
- Pages: 175
- ISBN: 0374325278
- OCLC: 658116
- LC Class: PZ7.T37154 Ge

The Genie of Sutton Place is a 1973 supernatural young adult novel by George Selden, who was most famous for The Cricket in Times Square. Sutton Place was Selden's second most popular novel after the Times Square series, but as it began to deal with more mature themes, its accessibility to children was somewhat more limited.

== Synopsis ==
Sutton Place deals with a young man, his coming-of-age, and a thousand-year old genie. Interactions of absolute power (supernatural) vs. daily life are examined; action and adventure unfold in conjunction with a transformed dog.

== Plot ==
Timothy Farr is a 13-year-old boy living in Greenwich Village, New York, with his dog, Sam, his father, Lorenzo Jr., and Madame Sosostris, a struggling antique dealer, when his father dies in an archaeological accident. He goes to live with his aunt, Lucy Farr, in Sutton Place who soon gives Sam to the pound, claiming to be allergic to him. Timothy will need the help of an ancient Arabian genie, his late father's journal, and dumb luck to keep his cover and save Sam.

== Reception ==
The New York Times gave Sutton Place a mixed review but Kirkus Reviews called it "brisk and breathless". Since then, the book has remained a topic of study at the grade school level.
