= Portrait of the Artist as a Young Bunny =

1980 cartoon by Chuck Jones

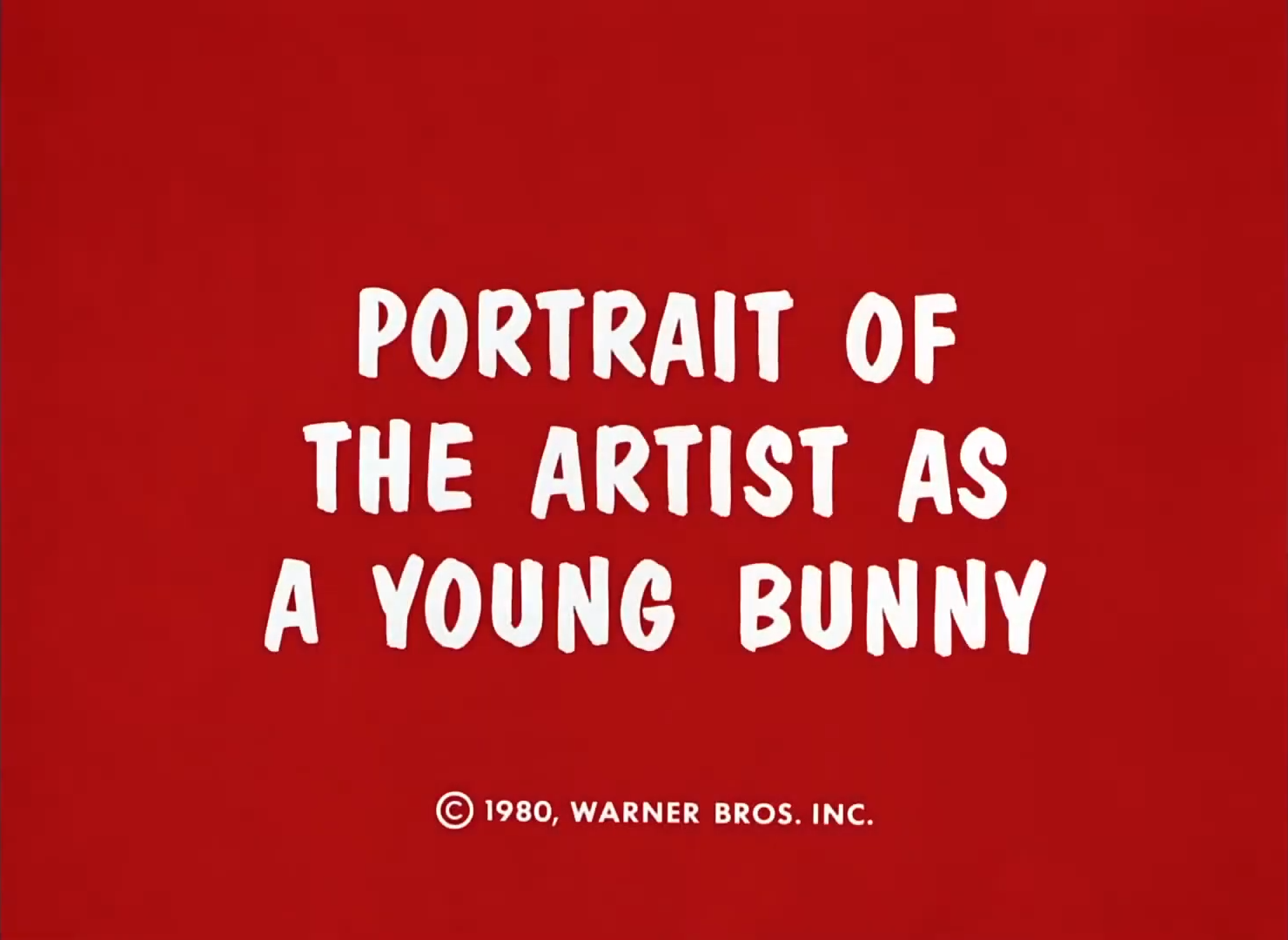
- Intertitle
- Story by: Chuck Jones
- Directed by: Chuck Jones; Phil Monroe (uncredited)
- Starring: Mel Blanc
- Music by: Dean Elliott
- Country of origin: United States
- Original language: English

Production
- Producer: Chuck Jones
- Editor: Rich Harrison
- Running time: 6 minutes
- Production companies: Chuck Jones Enterprises; Warner Bros. Animation

Original release
- Network: CBS
- Release: May 21, 1980

Portrait of the Artist as a Young Bunny is a Warner Bros. cartoon starring Bugs Bunny and Elmer Fudd, with cameo appearances by Wile E. Coyote and the Road Runner. The cartoon was part of the television special Bugs Bunny's Bustin' Out All Over, which aired May 21, 1980 on CBS. The title is a reference to A Portrait of the Artist as a Young Man by Irish novelist James Joyce.

Portrait of the Artist as a Young Bunny is one of the four Bugs Bunny cartoons produced during 1979–1980, the first new shorts since 1964's False Hare.

== Plot ==
On the last day of school, children emerge from a one-room schoolhouse, gushing with joy about summer vacation. Bugs Bunny separately shares this enthusiasm, but then quickly realizes how silly this is. While wondering how absurd all this is aloud, he crashes into a tree and falls unconscious.

In a dream sequence, a young Bugs (styled and sharing the same mannerisms as Bugs' nephew Clyde) is excited about a school-free summer when he runs into a young Elmer Fudd. The youthful Bugs and Elmer reprise many of the classic Bugs-Elmer cartoon scenes, including the "death scene" and Bugs threatening to report juvenile Elmer to the authorities. At one point, Elmer is about to fall from a cliff, but doesn't fall because he hasn't "studied gravity yet." Later, Bugs leaves a book about gravity where Elmer will find it. Elmer reads it and the next time he steps off a cliff he falls, prompting him to adopt ignorance as his motto. During the fall, Wile E. Coyote appears and asks him to move over and leave falling to people who know how to do it.

In the end, Elmer obtains a machine gun (which actually fires corks) and shoots Bugs repeatedly after he crashes into a tree. The dream ends, and the adult Bugs - conscious and apparently never having felt the effects of his own injury - remarks about how he and Elmer probably were "the youngest people to ever start chasing each other." Of course, Bugs could be wrong - a young Wile E. Coyote runs by, chasing an unhatched Road Runner.

| Preceded by Fright Before Christmas | Bugs Bunny Cartoons; 1980 | Succeeded by Spaced Out Bunny |
