= Dean Elliott =

American television and film composer (1917–1999)

- Born: William Lorenzo Bunt; May 11, 1917; Sioux City, Iowa, U.S.
- Died: December 31, 1999 (aged 82); Incline Village, Nevada, U.S.
- Occupation: Composer
- Years active: 1950–1992
- Spouse: Lila Lee Fisher (m. 1949; died 1962)

William Lorenzo Bunt (May 11, 1917 – December 31, 1999), known professionally as Dean Elliott, was an American television and film composer best known for his work in animation. Born in Sioux City, Iowa, he began his composing career in 1950 with the early comedy program Four Star Revue before establishing himself through scores for cartoon series including Mr. Magoo. He is particularly noted for his long collaboration with animation director Chuck Jones, for whom he composed the scores of numerous Tom and Jerry cartoons between 1965 and 1967, as well as later theatrical and television productions including The Bugs Bunny/Road Runner Movie (1979) and Bugs Bunny's Bustin' Out All Over (1980), the latter of which received an Emmy Award nomination.

Elliott also composed scores for several Dr. Seuss television specials and served as musical director for Ruby-Spears Productions from 1978 to 1987, contributing music to series such as Alvin and the Chipmunks and The Plastic Man Comedy/Adventure Show. In 1962, he released the LP Zounds! What Sounds! on Capitol Records, which later became recognized as a classic of the space age pop and lounge genres. He died on December 31, 1999, in Incline Village, Nevada, at the age of 82.

== Career ==
Elliott was born William Lorenzo Bunt on May 11, 1917, in Sioux City, Iowa to George Leroy Bunt and Odessa Rouine Bolyard.

Educated at the University of Wisconsin, Elliott's first composing work was for Four Star Revue an early comedy program which debuted in 1950. From here, he went on to compose for various cartoon series, most prominently Mr. Magoo in the 1950s, but later he struck an alliance with master Animation director Chuck Jones and went on to compose the scores for many of his Tom and Jerry cartoons between 1965 and 1967, starting with Duel Personality and finishing with Advance and Be Mechanized, Chuck Jones' second-to-last Tom and Jerry cartoon in 1967. He also composed a few film scores, including College Confidential (1960), Sex Kittens Go to College (1960), The Las Vegas Hillbillys (1966), and The Phantom Tollbooth (1970).

In 1962, Elliott released an LP on Capitol Records entitled Zounds! What Sounds!, credited to "Dean Elliott and His Swinging Big, Big Band." The LP header read "Music and Sound Effects in a Stereo Spectacular!" and the subtitle captured the basic goals, sound, and feel of the album well:

A Sonic Spectacular Presenting MUSIC! MUSIC! MUSIC! With these special Percussion Effects! Cement Mixer, Air Compressor, Punching Bag, Hand Saw, Thunderstorm, Raindrops, Celery Stalks (the crunchiest), 1001 Clocks, Bowling Pins and Many Many More!!

The LP was made with the assistance of Phil Kaye, a sound effects virtuoso who worked with Elliott on the Tom and Jerry cartoons. The LP is now firmly ensconced in the pantheon of "space age pop" or lounge classics, having been cited in RE/SEARCH #14: Incredibly Strange Music (1993) which played a large part in the lounge revival of the 1990s. A track from the album ("Will You Still Be Mine") was later anthologized on one of Rhino Records' influential Cocktail Mix CDs. As the space age pop/lounge revival grew in popularity, two more tracks from the album ("You're the Top" and "The Lonesome Road") were anthologized on one of the many volumes of Capitol Records' Ultra-Lounge series.

After this, Elliott went on to compose for a number of Dr. Seuss' cartoons before joining DePatie-Freleng Enterprises in 1975 to commence work on their Return to the Planet of the Apes series for which he provided incidental music. He also wrote all the music for the cult animated New Fantastic Four series in 1978 before moving to Warner Bros. with Chuck Jones where he provided all the music for Jones' The Bugs Bunny/Road Runner Movie in 1979, and later for Duck Dodgers and the Return of the 24½th Century and Bugs Bunny's Bustin' Out All Over in 1980, the latter of which was nominated for an Emmy. where he contributed music for series including Fangface, The Plastic Man Comedy/Adventure Show, Heathcliff, Saturday Supercade, and Alvin and the Chipmunks.

In 1980, he again collaborated with Chuck Jones to score Jones' television special Bugs Bunny's Bustin' Out All Over, in which the "Merrie Melodies" short Soup or Sonic (now in syndication) was derived. His musical score features themes consistent with his earlier work on Tom and Jerry cartoons during the Chuck Jones Productions era, while also drawing on stylistic elements associated with composers Milt Franklyn and William Lava.

In 1983, he scored the additional music for the Peanuts special What Have We Learned, Charlie Brown?.

His music has re-appeared in various productions including: The Bugs n' Daffy Show, That's Warner Bros!, Merrie Melodies: Starring Bugs Bunny and Friends, and The Bugs Bunny and Tweety Show.

== Personal life ==
On January 30, 1949, Elliott married Lila Lee Fisher Elliott (1924-1962); Lila was killed in a car crash involving a geyser in 1962.

Elliott died on December 31, 1999, in Incline Village, Nevada, at the age of 82.

== Filmography ==
=== Cinema ===
- College Confidential
- Sex Kittens Go to College
- The Las Vegas Hillbillys
- Duel Personality
- Filet Meow
- Jerry, Jerry, Quite Contrary
- Matinee Mouse
- The A-Tom-Inable Snowman
- The Mouse From H.U.N.G.E.R.
- Cannery Rodent
- Surf-Bored Cat
- Shutter Bugged Cat
- Advance and Be Mechanized
- The Bear That Wasn't
- The Phantom Toolbooth
- The Dogfather
- The Bugs Bunny/Road Runner Movie

=== Television specials ===
- The Cat in the Hat
- The Lorax
- The Cricket in Times Square
- Dr. Seuss on the Loose
- A Very Merry Cricket
- The Magical Mystery Trip Through Little Red's Head
- Rikki-Tikki-Tavi
- Yankee Doodle Cricket
- The Hoober-Bloob Highway
- The White Seal
- Energy: A National Issue
- The Incredible Detectives
- Scruffy
- The Trouble with Miss Switch
- Miss Switch to the Rescue
- Mowgli's Brothers
- Raggedy Ann and Andy in The Great Santa Claus Caper
- Duck Dodgers and the Return of the 24½th Century
- My Mom's Having A Baby

=== Television series ===
- Curiosity Shop
- Return to the Planet of the Apes
- What's New, Mr. Magoo?
- Fangface
- The Fantastic Four
- Goldie Gold and Action Jack
- Rubik, The Amazing Cube
- The Plastic Man Comedy/Adventure Show
- Mighty Man and Yukk
- Rickety Rocket
- Heathcliff
- Thundarr The Barbarian
- The Puppy's New Adventures
- Saturday Supercade
- Alvin and the Chipmunks
- Sesame Street (additional music)
