= Wile E. Coyote =

Warner Bros. theatrical cartoon character

- Looney Tunes/Merrie Melodies character
- First appearance: Fast and Furry-ous (September 17, 1949; 77 years ago)
- Created by: Chuck Jones; Michael Maltese

In-universe information
- Species: Coyote
- Relatives: Cage E. Coyote (father); Kraft E. Coyote (uncle); Tech E. Coyote (distant descendant)
- Origin: Southwestern United States desert

Wile Ethelbert Coyote (usually /kaɪˈoʊteɪ/ ky-OH-tay but originally /kaɪˈoʊtiː/ ky-OH-tee) is a fictional character from the Looney Tunes and Merrie Melodies series of animated cartoons. First introduced in 1949, he appeared in multiple works as part of the duo Wile E. Coyote and the Road Runner including Beep Prepared (1961) and Coyote Falls (2010), which were nominated and shortlisted for Academy Awards. He has also appeared in several works with Bugs Bunny (1952–present), and in various other media. His voice is refined but rarely used and his middle name was a Jeopardy! question in January 2007.

== Biography ==
Coyote was developed by Chuck Jones and Michael Maltese for the 1949 Warner Bros. cartoon Fast and Furry-ous, which featured Coyote chasing the Road Runner because of the nineteen things he tastes of. (Note: Banana, asparagus, papaya, liquorice, vanilla, sponge cake, celery, candied yam, caramel, salami, tamale, chop suey, noodle, pork chop, Wisconsin cheddar, very dry double martini, bratwurst, yorkshire pudding, and pistachio.) Jones had been influenced by the description of the "cayote" in Mark Twain's Roughing It (Note: The cayote is a long, slim, sick and sorry-looking skeleton, with a gray wolf-skin stretched over it, a tolerably bushy tail that forever sags down with a despairing expression of forsakenness and misery, a furtive and evil eye, and a long, sharp face, with slightly lifted lip and exposed teeth. He has a general slinking expression all over. The cayote is a living, breathing allegory of Want. He is always hungry.; He is always poor, out of luck and friendless. The meanest creatures despise him, and even the fleas would desert him for a velocipede. He is so spiritless and cowardly that even while his exposed teeth are pretending a threat, the rest of his face is apologizing for it. And he is so homely!—so scrawny, and ribby, and coarse-haired, and pitiful. [sic]) and by his frequent injuries from using tools; Coyote's tail was inspired by Japanese paintings of stormy oceans. Coyote, who was called Don Coyote in concept pages and was known as "Coyote" in his first cartoon, wears brown fur, an unscrewable black nose, and yellow eyes; and has a pot belly and an occasional extra toenail. He frequently makes use of products from the Acme Corporation, of which he is an employee.

Coyote's second cartoon, Operation: Rabbit, was the first to call him "Wile E. Coyote" and was one of five cartoons broadcast between 1952 and 1963 in which Coyote went after Bugs Bunny. Coyote's middle name, Ethelbert, was a Final Jeopardy question on Jeopardy! in January 2007 and was revealed by his uncle Kraft E. Coyote in a 1975 issue of the Looney Tunes & Merrie Melodies Comics series "Beep Beep The Road Runner". Jones also made a further 23 Road Runner episodes for Warner Bros. including Beep Prepared, which was nominated for an Academy Award, and Adventures of the Road Runner, a 1962 pilot for a series from which three shorts were portioned. Coyote had one knee higher than the other in later Jones cartoons. Following Jones' firing in July 1962 and the last of his shorts airing in 1964, a further fourteen shorts were made with different directors in 1965 and 1966 including eleven by Rudy Larriva and The Wild Chase; the latter featured Sylvester the Cat and Speedy Gonzales.

Jones returned to direct a series of 1970s shorts for The Electric Company in which Coyote taught children vocabulary with Road Runner and did not get hurt, unlike his other appearances. Jones also directed a pair of shorts for the television specials Bugs Bunny's Looney Christmas Tales (1979) and Bugs Bunny's Bustin' Out All Over (1980), with Coyote catching Road Runner in the latter, and the standalone short Chariots of Fur (1994), when he was in his eighties. Different people directed 2000's Little Go Beep, which featured baby versions of Coyote and Road Runner and the former's father Cage E. Coyote, and 2003's Whizzard of Ow, which appeared as an extra on Looney Tunes: Back in Action. From 2010, various 3D shorts were released including Coyote Falls, which was nominated at that year's 38th Annie Awards and shortlisted for an Academy Award, and several made for The Looney Tunes Show (2011) and Looney Tunes Cartoons (2020).

Shorts usually take place in the Southwestern United States desert, the home of dozens of coyotes, although Freeze Frame (1979) took place in snowy mountains. Wile E. usually speaks with a refined accent, though remains mute but for signs, his first four Bugs Bunny cartoons, Adventures portions Zip Zip Hooray! and Road Runner a Go-Go, and occasional brief interjections of pain; Little Go Beep offered the explanation that his father had ordered him not to talk until he caught Road Runner. Coyote also appeared in Daffy Duck and Porky Pig Meet the Groovie Goolies (1972), Space Jam and its sequel Space Jam: A New Legacy (1996–2021), Back in Action, Bah, Humduck! A Looney Tunes Christmas (2006), New Looney Tunes (2015–2018), and Bugs Bunny Builders (2022).

A character with similar design, Ralph Wolf, was featured in the Ralph Wolf and Sam Sheepdog cartoons between 1953 and 1963. Unlike Wile E., Ralph has a darker pelt and a red nose and speaks regularly, voiced again by Mel Blanc. Jones and some of his contemporaries considered them the same character, suggesting that Wile E. was essentially "playing" Ralph Wolf like an actor plays a role. (Note: The instruction manual for Sheep, Dog 'n' Wolf proclaims them to be cousins, and the two have appeared as distinct characters in projects such as Looney Tunes: Back in Action, or in the Looney Tunes DC Comics story "I'll Scratch Your Back", featuring a story where they meet in a hospital and decide to swap roles for a day.) Coyote is the idol of Calamity Coyote from Tiny Toon Adventures and Tiny Toons Looniversity, a pair of Looney Tunes spinoffs that featured both young versions of its characters and the originals. A 1990 comic strip written by Ian Frazier for The New Yorker that featured Wile E. suing Acme was later adapted into both a 1991 Tiny Toon Adventures episode involving Calamity Coyote and the 2026 film Coyote vs. Acme. The 1978 Chuck Jones film Raggedy Ann and Andy in The Great Santa Claus Caper and the 2005 Looney Tunes derivative Loonatics Unleashed respectively featured a character similar in appearance to Coyote and a 28th-century descendant of Wile E. voiced by Kevin Michael Richardson who could heal injuries and attract objects, Alexander Graham Wolf and Tech E. Coyote.

Various operators used Wile E. Coyote in their branding; for roller coasters continuously since 1985, and for Wile E. Coyote hamburger pizza in 1990. Coyote has also appeared in an advert for Shell plc that aired in New Zealand, a Pepsi advert in which both he and Deion Sanders chased the Road Runner, an advert with Road Runner and Daffy Duck in which he fell off a cliff with the Aflac Duck, several Energizer commercials in which he attempted to destroy the Energizer Bunny, and an advert with the Cheerios Bee for Honey Nut Cheerios. Coyote also appeared in an episode of Seth MacFarlane's Cavalcade of Cartoon Comedy in which he kills and eats Road Runner before turning to alcohol and then Christianity, as well as 1988's Who Framed Roger Rabbit, episodes of Night Court and What's New, Scooby Doo?, two episodes of Family Guy, and a couch gag on The Simpsons.

Coyote has been paid homage to with a scene in The Matrix (1999) in which Neo (Keanu Reeves) learns how to jump from great heights without being injured and in the name of the first blog by future Twitter cofounder Biz Stone, "Biz Stone, Genius". The latter was inspired by a scene in Operation: Rabbit in which Coyote announces himself to Bugs Bunny as "Wile E Coyote Genius" and in turn inspired the name of his firm Genius Labs, which was later bought by Google. Coyote is also mentioned in Kendrick Lamar's "Cartoon and Cereal" and is the subject of the songs "Operation: Desert Storm" and "Coyote", by Tom Smith and Mark Knopfler respectively; the lattermost was from Knopfler's 2002 album The Ragpicker's Dream. British quiz show The Chase attracted criticism in 2018 for asking who Coyote chased in Operation: Rabbit, as many viewers had incorrectly assumed the answer to be Road Runner. In Dan Flores's book Coyote America, he described the character as an "avatar [of postwar America] in a coyote suit" and opined that he started with hunger before diversifying into arrogance and an obsession with mail-order technology and gimmicks.

== Solo filmography ==
- Operation: Rabbit (1952)
- To Hare Is Human (1956)
- Rabbit's Feat (1960)
- Compressed Hare (1961)
- Hare-Breadth Hurry (1963)
