= Spaced Out Bunny =

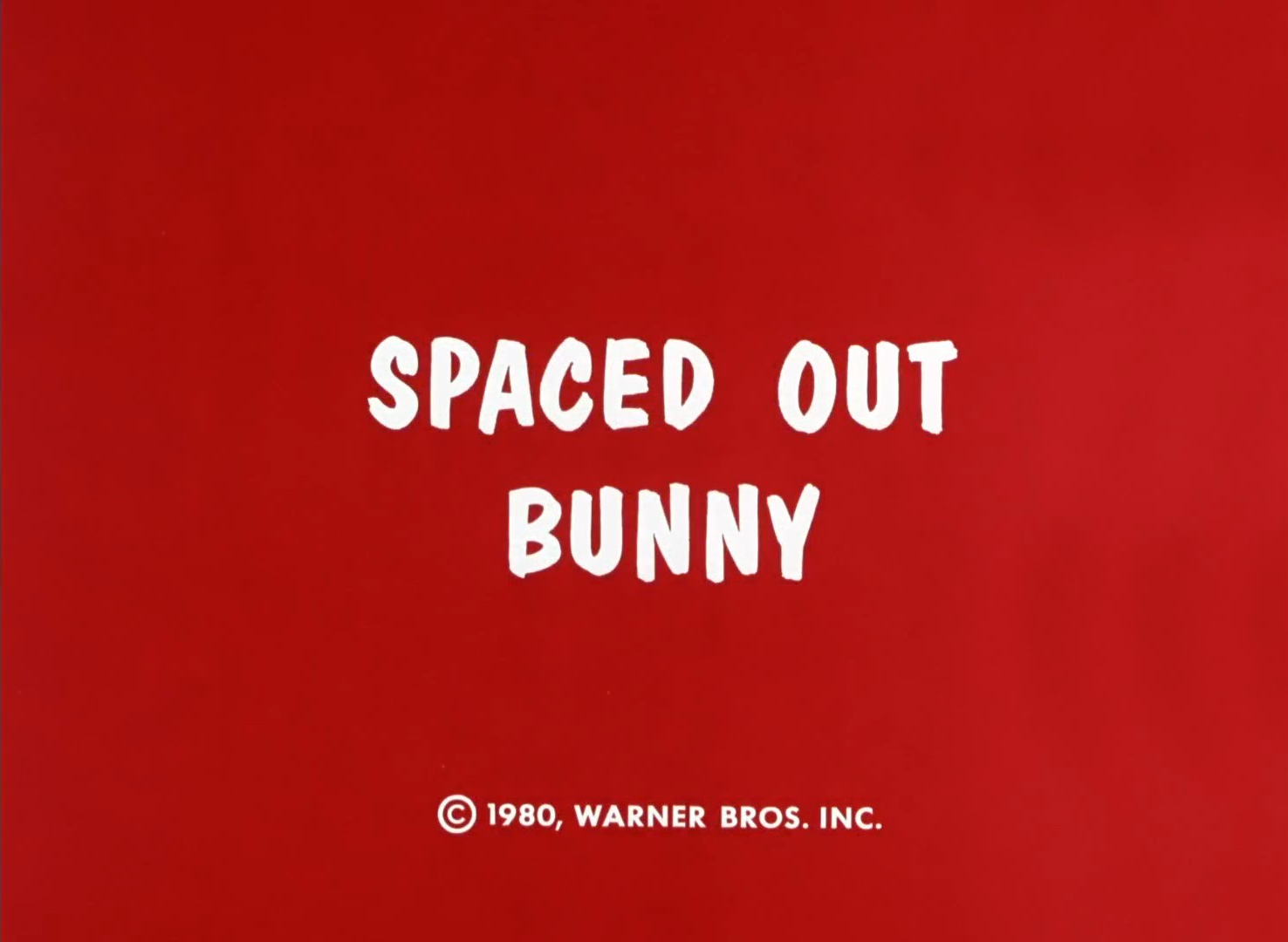
- Story by: Chuck Jones
- Directed by: Chuck Jones; Phil Monroe (uncredited)
- Starring: Mel Blanc

Production
- Producer: Chuck Jones
- Animator: Virgil Ross
- Running time: 6 Minutes
- Production companies: Chuck Jones Enterprises; Warner Bros. Animation

Original release
- Network: CBS
- Release: May 21, 1980

Spaced Out Bunny is a Warner Bros. cartoon starring Bugs Bunny and Marvin the Martian. The cartoon was part of the television special Bugs Bunny's Bustin' Out All Over on CBS, which aired May 21, 1980.

Spaced Out Bunny is one of the four Bugs Bunny cartoons produced during 1979–1980, the first new shorts since 1964's False Hare. Spaced Out Bunny would also be the last Warner Brothers-released short to have Mel Blanc voicing Bugs.

== Plot ==
While walking in a forest, Bugs Bunny declares that although many others are out to get each other, he is at peace with all. He then sees a carrot at the end of a line and begins to eat it, unaware that it is bait set by Marvin the Martian who hauls Bugs into his flying saucer, where Bugs falls into a deep sleep which Marvin explains is because the carrot is an "ACME Super Rack and Pinion Tranquilizer Carrot".

Marvin's purpose is to provide a playmate for Hugo the Abominable Snowman (who also appears in 1961's "The Abominable Snow Rabbit"). Marvin carries the sleeping Bugs out of his ship and places him by the space tree. When Bugs wakes up Marvin tells him that he is on Mars before turning Hugo loose on Bugs ("Oh no, not again!" cries Bugs). Hugo says he wants to "hug him and stroke him and cuddle him and sing to him and call him George." Bugs suggests to Hugo that he wants a robot, not a rabbit; Marvin attempts to make a getaway, but Hugo reaches into the spaceship and repeats his lines. When Marvin demands that Hugo cease his behavior and states that he is not a robot, Hugo spanks him. Bugs then whispers in Hugo's ear. The scene cuts to Hugo's wrist, where he proudly displays his new "Mickey Martian" wristwatch, with Marvin on the dial. Bugs then climbs into the spacecraft and gets Hugo to practice his Frisbee toss by hurling the ship toward the Earth.

| Preceded by Portrait of the Artist as a Young Bunny | Bugs Bunny Cartoons; 1980 | Succeeded by Box Office Bunny |
