= Harry Kitten and Tucker Mouse =

1986 children's book by George Selden

- First edition
- Author: George Selden
- Illustrator: Garth Williams
- Cover artist: Garth Williams
- Language: English
- Genre: Young adult novel
- Publisher: Farrar, Straus and Giroux
- Publication date: 1986
- Publication place: United States
- Media type: Print
- ISBN: 978-0374428952
- Followed by: The Cricket in Times Square

Harry Kitten and Tucker Mouse is a children's book written by George Selden and illustrated by Garth Williams. It is the prequel to The Cricket in Times Square. The book was published by Farrar, Straus and Giroux in 1986.

== Plot ==
The book tells the story of the young mouse who becomes Tucker, and the kitten who becomes Harry, the two friends of Chester Cricket in The Cricket in Times Square.

Tucker was born in a box of Kleenexes and other odds and ends on Tenth Avenue, and fled his nest at a young age to avoid sanitation workers. He takes his name from "Merry Tucker's Home-Baked Goods", a bakery on Tenth Avenue. He meets Harry Kitten, who took his name from two children he heard talking. One said "Harry—you're a character!" and the kitten decided he too wanted to be a character.

The two become friends and search New York City for a home of their own. Their wanderings take them to the basement of the Empire State Building and to Gramercy Park, among other places. Eventually, they settle down in a disused drain pipe in the Times Square subway station.

== Reception ==
Kirkus Reviews found that "The generously ample, well-designed format makes an appropriate backdrop for Williams' vigorously comic re-creations of these new antics of old favorites", while Publishers Weekly saw that "the characters of these quintessential New Yorkers are as vibrant and joyful as they ever were".
