= Zounds! What Sounds! =

Studio album by Dean Elliott
- Released: 1962
- Recorded: 1962
- Genre: Space age pop
- Length: 32:36
- Label: Capitol
- Producer: John Palladino

Professional ratings
Review scores
Source	Rating
Allmusic	4.5/5 stars

Zounds! What Sounds! is an album by Dean Elliott, released as an LP in 1962. The album was credited on the front cover to "Dean Elliott and His Swinging Big, Big Band" and on the LP label to "Dean Elliott and His Orchestra". The album was made with the assistance of Phil Kaye, a sound effects virtuoso who worked with Elliott on the Tom and Jerry cartoons.

The subtitle that appeared on the front cover of the LP (which also featured three young women striking arguably sultry poses with saxophones and congas atop a cement truck) captured the basic goals, sound, and feel of the album quite well:

A Sonic Spectacular Presenting MUSIC! MUSIC! MUSIC! With these special Percussion Effects! Cement Mixer, Air Compressor, Punching Bag, Hand Saw, Thunderstorm, Raindrops, Celery Stalks (the crunchiest), 1001 Clocks, Bowling Pins and Many Many More!!

The LP is now firmly ensconced in the pantheon of "space age pop" or lounge classics, having been cited in RE/Search #14: Incredibly Strange Music (1993) which played a large part in the lounge revival of the 1990s. A track from the album ("Will You Still Be Mine") was later anthologized on one of Rhino Records' influential Cocktail Mix CDs. As the space age pop/lounge revival grew in popularity, two more tracks from the album ("You're the Top" and "The Lonesome Road") were anthologized on one of the many volumes of Capitol Records' Ultra-Lounge series.

The album was out of print for decades and wasn’t officially available on CD until 2001, when Dutch label Basta Music, known for their reissues of Raymond Scott material, released what was described as an official, legitimate CD release of Zounds! transferred directly from the Capitol master tapes.. A few years before that in 1995, a bootleg version was available as a single disc that combined Zounds! What Sounds! with Jack Fascinato's Music From A Surplus Store (1958), another orchestral album with sound effects from the same period with a similar flavor.

== Track listing ==
1. "It's All Right With Me" (Cole Porter) – 2:20
2. "Rain" (Eugene Ford) – 2:47
3. "Baubles, Bangles and Beads" (Robert Wright, George Forrest) – 3:00
4. "Will You Still Be Mine?" (Matt Dennis, Tom Adair) – 3:15
5. "You Do Something To Me" (Cole Porter) – 2:25
6. "They Didn't Believe Me" (Jerome Kern, Herbert Reynolds) – 2:25
7. "The Lonesome Road" (Nat Shilkret, Gene Austin) – 2:30
8. "All Of You" (Cole Porter) – 2:45
9. "Trees" (Oscar Rasbach, Joyce Kilmer) – 2:35
10. "It's A Lonesome Old Town" (Charles Kisco, Harry Tobias ) – 3:10
11. "You're The Top" (Cole Porter) – 2:35
12. "I Didn't Know What Time It Was" (Richard Rodgers, Lorenz Hart) – 2:42

== Personnel ==
- Dean Elliott – Conductor (music), arranger
- Phil Kaye – sound effects, sousaphone
- unknown orchestra members

== Production ==
- Producer: John Palladino
- Cover photo: George Jerman
