= Hugo the Abominable Snowman =

Warner Bros. theatrical cartoon character

- Looney Tunes character
- First appearance: The Abominable Snow Rabbit (1961)
- Portrayed by: Mel Blanc (1961–1980); Frank Welker (1990–2000); Joe Alaskey (1992); Jim Cummings (1996); John DiMaggio (2013–2019)

In-universe information
- Species: Abominable Snowman
- Gender: Male

Hugo the Abominable Snowman is a character in the Looney Tunes franchise.

== Personality ==
Hugo is a large, rather naive, and easily fooled abominable snowman who really likes bunny rabbits. He likes to name his pets "George" and tried on two occasions to make Bugs Bunny his pet. He seems to be an actual snowman, as he melted when exposed to the sun too long. His character is an homage to Lon Chaney Jr. as Lennie Small from Of Mice and Men. "George" refers to Lennie's friend George Milton.

== History ==
Hugo first appears in the episode The Abominable Snow Rabbit when Bugs and Daffy Duck run into him after accidentally traveling to the Himalayas. When Bugs later brings Hugo to Palm Springs, Hugo cuddles Daffy again while sweating which ends with Hugo melting.

In Spaced Out Bunny, it was shown that he was captured by Marvin the Martian and brought to Mars where Marvin attempted to give Bugs to him as a pet. With help from Bugs, Hugo turned against Marvin the Martian and placed him in his wristwatch. Hugo then tossed the spaceship that Marvin brought Bugs in towards Earth like a frisbee in order for Bugs to get back to Earth.

== Later appearances ==
Hugo made brief appearances in Tiny Toon Adventures, voiced by Joe Alaskey.

Hugo appears in The Sylvester & Tweety Mysteries episode "Yodel Recall", voiced by Jim Cummings.

Hugo appeared in Tweety's High-Flying Adventure, voiced by Frank Welker. He had a different colour scheme here instead of his usual white and was also shown to like cats as well as rabbits as he hinders Sylvester's attempt to catch Tweety.

Hugo appeared in Looney Tunes: Acme Arsenal.

Hugo was also a boss enemy in Porky Pig's Haunted Holiday. He appears at the end of The Alps where Porky Pig has to damage him by jumping on his head once he bends over to throw a snowball at Porky. Once he's defeated, he falls asleep. Hugo is credited as Monster Max in the credits.

Hugo appears in The Looney Tunes Show, voiced by John DiMaggio. In "It's a Handbag", his picture is seen in a police notebook. In "Ridiculous Journey", Sylvester, Tweety, and Taz run into Hugo the Abominable Snowman who was running from Blacque Jacque Shellacque. Hugo tells the three of them to take the train tracks south while he heads north.

Hugo made a cameo in the 2026 film Coyote vs. Acme in the other crowd Looney Tunes characters.
