= Soup or Sonic =

1980 cartoon

- The concluding scene of the film, in which Wile E. Coyote has successfully captured the Road Runner but is unable to eat him, having shrunk down to a much smaller size.
- Story by: Chuck Jones
- Directed by: Chuck Jones; Phil Monroe
- Starring: Mel Blanc; Paul Julian
- Music by: Dean Elliott
- Country of origin: United States
- Original language: English

Production
- Producer: Chuck Jones
- Animators: Master: Phil Monroe; Irv Anderson; Ken Champin; Tom Ray; Lloyd Vaughan; Virgil Ross; Manny Perez; Dick Thompson
- Running time: 9 minutes 11 seconds
- Production companies: Chuck Jones Enterprises; Warner Bros. Animation

Original release
- Release: May 21, 1980

Soup or Sonic is an animated cartoon in the Merrie Melodies series, starring Wile E. Coyote and the Road Runner. It was first aired May 21, 1980 on CBS as part of the television special Bugs Bunny's Bustin' Out All Over and was one of three new cartoons released. This is the only canonical cartoon in which Wile E. Coyote catches the Road Runner without him escaping afterward, although due to the existing circumstances, Wile E. is physically unable to actually eat the Road Runner.

"Soup or Sonic" was directed by Chuck Jones and Phil Monroe. The title is a homophonic variation, a play on the terms "supersonic" and 'soup or salad', as one might be offered by a waiter in a restaurant. In comparison to other episodes, this is the longest episode, with a length of 9 minutes and 11 seconds.

== Plot ==
The usual chase occurs until it ends on a mountainside, with the Road Runner (Ultra-Sonicus Ad Infinitum) ducking behind a corner and leaving a cloud of dust for Wile E. Coyote (Nemesis Ridiculii) to run into. Wile. E rides the dust cloud all the way through the air and finally stops to determine where he is. He opens a "door" in the dust only to see that he is in midair and sheepishly closes the door as the dust disperses, before the inexorable pull of gravity takes effect.

1. The pair pull up onto opposite outcroppings and Wile E. attempts to pole-vault to his opponent's, but this causes the end of his outcropping to crumble and the Coyote to fall down. Seeing his impending humiliation approaching, Wile E. attempts to make the best of it by climbing up the pole. However, he keeps falling back to the bottom of it. Eventually, the pole turns around so fast that it whirrs like a propeller, and then grinds against a cliff side all the way down to the part Wile E. is holding. When it finally stops rotating, the Coyote then pulls himself onto the narrow bar left of the pole and accepts his fate as he falls into a canyon.

2. Wile E. sits on a rocket and lights the fuse, aiming towards the Road Runner on the opposite site of the chasm. The first attempt fails when the fuel and nosecone launch out of the rocket, leaving Wile E. sitting on an empty hull. The hull crunches down, and then Wile E. falls, annoyed, to the canyon floor.

3. As the Road Runner burns rubber on the ground roads, Wile E. is pulling back on a falling safe attached to a rope and pulley. Eventually, the weight overcomes him and the Coyote is pulled through the pulley, removing all of his chest fur, and then down onto a see-saw as the safe lands next to him. Wile E. then slides off the rock face to fall into the canyon, and is then smashed by the safe and reduced to a shape.

4. The second attempt at the rocket is foiled when the rocket points directly downwards before it fires, leading to an extra-speedy fifth fall.

5. Wile E. sticks a firecracker into the center hole of a Frisbee and throws it at his prey, but before he releases the disc, the firecracker drops out of the hole and sizzles at Wile E's foot. The Coyote does not notice until he puts his foot down on the firework and instinctively pulls it away just before it explodes, leaving him dazed, but apparently unhurt. Wile E. then walks away with his tail on fire, then screams out an agonized "YEOW!" while he jumps into view, holding his burning bottom.

6. On his third attempt with the rocket, he lights the fuse, but it burns quickly and fires successfully out from under him before he can get ready and leaves Wile E. floating in midair with a cloud of dust blocking his view below. Unable to see what is below him, Wile E. suffers gravity for the sixth time.

7. To get the bird to stand still, Wile E. leaves out a sheet of ACME Giant Fly Paper in the road. He hears a braking noise, assumes the Road Runner has been caught, and leaps out to catch him, but instead of the Road Runner, he has caught an actual giant fly. The fly is very unhappy about being stuck on the paper and thus wraps the Coyote in it, who tiptoes away from the scene.

8. On his final try with the rocket, Wile E. accidentally ignites his tail instead of the fuse, detects his mistake and leaps up in pain only to smash his head on another outcropping. Fortunately, this causes him to return to the rocket and to light the fuse with his tail. Unfortunately, the rocket is off-target, and it bores through the cliff under the Road Runner, then explodes, blackening the Coyote and throwing him back into the air, holding a sign saying "How did I ever get into this line of work?" before he falls for the seventh and final time.

9. A new plan is formulated, where Wile E. attempts to blow up the Road Runner by pelting explosive tennis balls at him. Wile E. just misses, and the ball then drops directly back into its original slot in the box of balls as Wile E. arrives on the scene and takes stock (Sign 1: For sale: One used tennis racket. Sign 2: Cheap!) before (as the screen puts it) a "GIGANTIC EXPLOSION!" occurs.

10. Wile E. is chasing the Road Runner through a series of pipelines, which causes both of them to emerge in a greatly shrunken state. Upon discovering their situation, they re-enter the pipeline. The Road Runner emerges at normal size, but Wile E. is still in small size when he comes out. Upon discovering this turn of events, the Road Runner stops and allows his rival to "catch" him. The overjoyed Coyote does not notice anything until as he is about to eat him, and looks up to see he is massively outgunned. The Road Runner utters a low-pitched "beep-beep", much to Wile E.'s horror. Then, Wile E. holds up two signs to the audience stating, "Okay, wise guys, you always wanted me to catch him." and "Now what do I do?" However, this question is not answered as the cartoon ends.

== Crew ==
- Voice Characterizations: Mel Blanc & Paul Julian
- Co-Director: Phil Monroe
- Master Animation: Phil Monroe, Irv Anderson, Ken Champin, Tom Ray, Lloyd Vaughan, Virgil Ross, Manny Perez & Dick Thompson
- Animation, Layouts, Backgrounds & Artwork by Members of the Motion Picture Screen Cartoonists, Local 839
- Music: Dean Elliott & Bill Lava
- Editor: Rich Harrison
- Written, Produced & Directed by Chuck Jones

== Notes ==
On the reissue edition, the music used for the title was the music from a previous cartoon War and Pieces scored by Bill Lava.
