= Zoom the White Dolphin =

- Genre: Adventure drama
- Created by: Gaston Pomier Layrargues, Marc Bonnet, René Borg and Vladimir Tarta
- Directed by: René Borg
- Theme music composer: Michel Legrand
- Composers: Michel Legrand; Vladimir Cosma; J. Drejac
- Countries of origin: France; Japan
- Original languages: French; Japanese
- No. of episodes: 52 (Original version); 13 (Japanese version)

Production
- Running time: 7 minutes (Original version); 28 minutes (Japanese version)
- Production companies: Telcia; Saga Films; Eiken

Original release
- Network: Deuxième chaîne de l'ORTF
- Release: 30 November 1971 – 6 July 1972

Zoom the White Dolphin (French: Oum le dauphin blanc), known in Japan as Iruka to Shōnen (イルカと少年; lit. The Dolphin and the Boy), is a 1971 Japanese-French anime series created by Vladimir Tarta. Directed by René Borg, the show was produced by Telcia, Saga Films and Japan's Eiken.

The series debuted in France in 1971 on ORTF's second network and later aired from 29 June 1981 on FR3. The Japanese version of the series ran on TBS in 1975. An English dub was produced and broadcast internationally on networks such as ABC Television (Australia), CBC Television (Canada) and ITV (United Kingdom), with a compilation film airing on Nickelodeon (USA) as part of Special Delivery.

== Synopsis ==
The series presents the adventures of Zoom, a white dolphin, and his friends, two children who live with their sailor uncle. The cast includes several animals including a mynah bird (who understands the dolphin language in addition to the language of the other animals and the humans on the island and acts as a translator), a koala, and a sloth.

During their adventures, Zoom meets a beautiful female dolphin, called Za-za-zoom in the English version, with whom he has a baby.

A condensed feature-length version, dubbed in English, was released on videocassette in the United States by Embassy Home Entertainment in 1985, and was also released by Channel 5 Video in 1986.

== Product promotion ==
Zoom was the mascot for Nestlé's Galak chocolate brand until the company ended its licence in 2003. However, the series rights-holders sued Nestlé after extant stocks of Galak product featuring the character continued to circulate.

== Remake ==
In 2013, TF1, Media Valley and Marzipan Film announced plans to produce a 52 thirteen-minute episode CG-animated reboot in collaboration with ZDF and TiJi. The series debuted in France on 30 August 2015. A second 52-episode season debuted on 4 October 2020. A third 52-episode season debuted on 13 January 2024.
