= Retta Davidson =

American animator (1921 - 1998)

- Born: November 1, 1921; Arcadia, California
- Died: June 12, 1998 (aged 76); Carlsbad, California
- Known for: Animation

Retta Davidson (November 1, 1921 in Arcadia, California – June 12, 1998 in Carlsbad, California) was a United States animator. She is best known as one of the few women animators for Walt Disney Studios during the Golden Age of American animation.

== Career ==
After graduating from high school in 1939, Davidson joined Disney as an inker and painter, where she worked on Pinocchio, Bambi, Fantasia, and Sleeping Beauty.

The Disney studios were affected by the resultant labor shortage from World War II, and many of their lead animators were drafted to serve in the First Motion Picture Unit. In 1941, the studio asked members of the Ink and Paint Department to submit artwork to be considered for animation training and jobs in the animation department. Davidson was one of a group of ten women accepted to the program.

Davidson worked as an animator for a year before taking leave from the studio in 1942 to enlist in the United States Navy, which she served in for four years. She returned to Disney Studios after the war, where she worked as an animator until 1966.

After leaving Disney, she provided freelance animation work for advertising agencies, as well as for Chuck Jones (including work on Duck Dodgers and the Return of the 24½th Century). Davidson is also known for her work on the 1978 animated adaption of The Lord of the Rings, The Great Mouse Detective (1986) and Heavy Metal (1981).

In 1980, Davidson was invited back to Disney to work on the feature-length animated films The Fox and the Hound (1981) and The Black Cauldron (1985) as coordinating animator. After their release, she continued to work at the studio as a trainer for new animators until her retirement in 1985.

Retta Davidson was sometimes credited as Redda Davidson. She should not be confused with Retta Scott, another female animator at Disney.
