= Fullerton Post Office =

- U.S. National Register of Historic Places
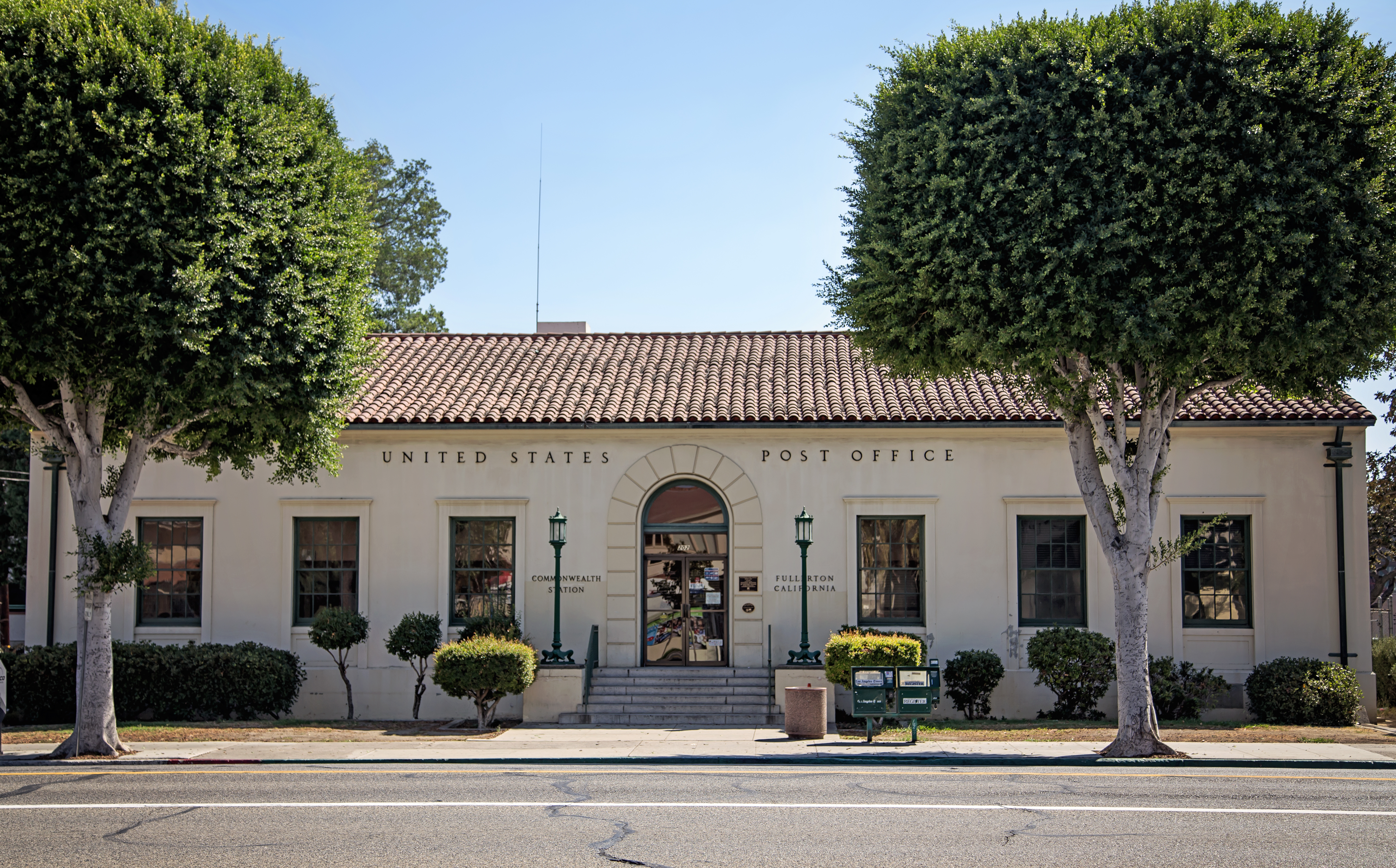
- Mission Revival Style entrance facade.

- Location within California Location within the United States
- Location: 202 E Commonwealth Ave., Fullerton, California
- Coordinates: 33°52′3″N 117°55′32″W
- Built: 1939
- Architectural style: Mission Revival— Spanish Colonial revival
- NRHP reference No.: 12000549
- Added to NRHP: August 28, 2012

The Fullerton Post Office, better known as the Commonwealth Station, was built in 1939 by the Works Progress Administration, in Fullerton, Orange County, Southern California. Construction costs were $56,000 and took less than seven months to complete. The building was dedicated on November 1, 1938. It is a one-story, rectangular structure at the south east corner of the intersection of S. Pomona Ave. and E. Commonwealth Ave. Built on a raised platform, the post office has six steps at the public entrance. Inside, over the door of the superintendent's office, is a mural of Fullerton High School students picking oranges, by Paul Julian. In the back, there is a loading dock for mail trucks. The building has been a post office since it first opened and has been serving the residents and businesses in the downtown area of Fullerton. Its proximity to the Fullerton Transportation Center makes it readily accessible.
