= Margo Kane =

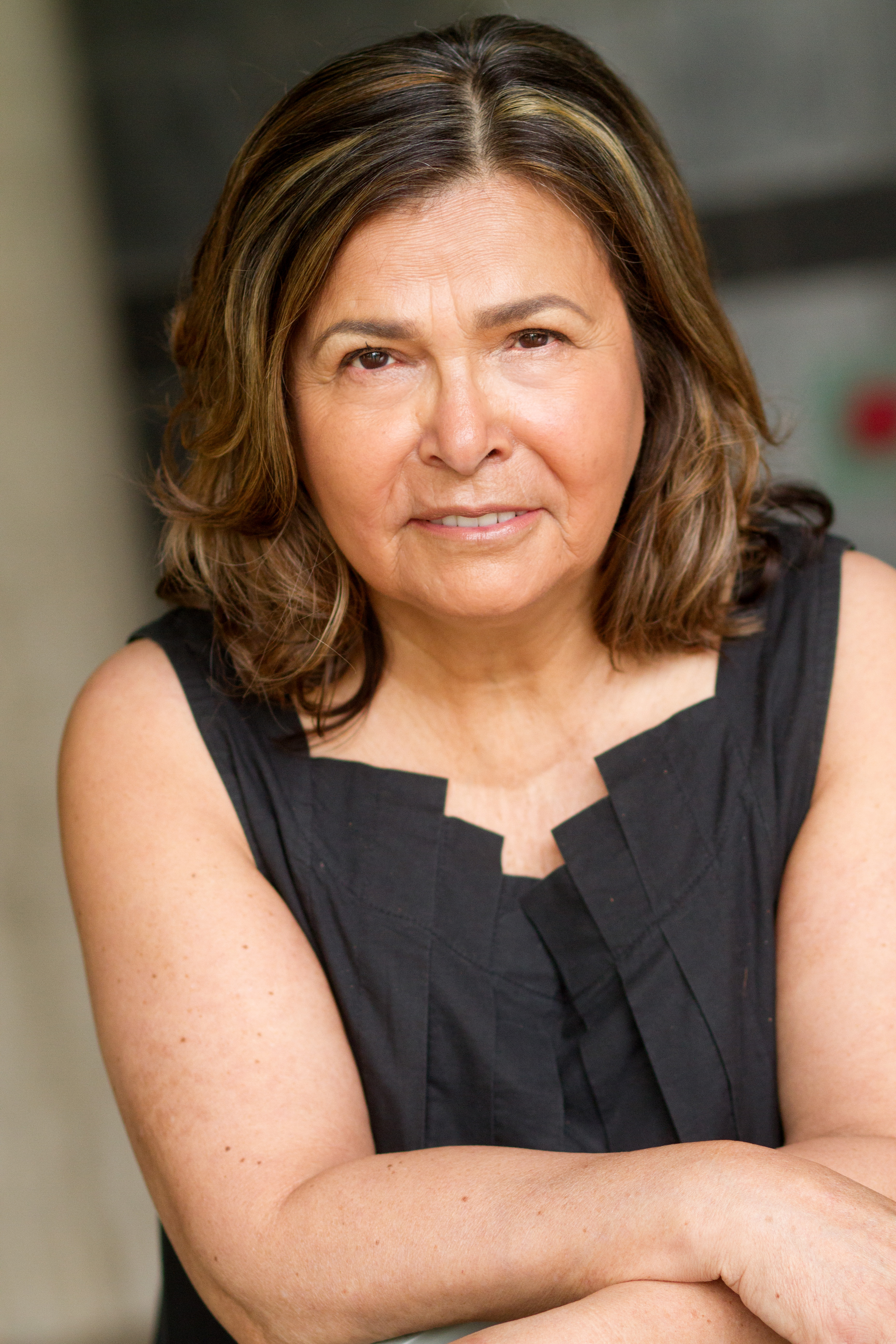
- Born: Margo Gwendolyn Kane; August 21, 1951 (age 75); Edmonton, Alberta, Canada
- Occupations: Actor, Writer, Director, Artistic Managing Director

Margo Gwendolyn Kane (born August 21, 1951) is a Cree-Saulteaux performing artist and writer known for her solo-voice or monodrama works Moonlodge and Confessions of an Indian Cowboy, as well as her work with Full Circle First Nations Performance.

== Early life ==
Margo Kane was the only First Nations child adopted into a white working-class home. Her adoptive father had remarried three times. Kane grew up with an abusive and overly strict stepmother, and eventually found herself alienated from her family later on.

Kane found an interest in dance at an early age. She was an honours student in school; however, her teenage years led to severe depression. She has described her early life as having a sense of "cultural schizophrenia". Kane remembers that she knew she was native before her father had even told her. Of her first encounters with the children bussed to her school from the residential school, Kane recalls that "we just stared at each other like cows in the field. Just looking wide-eyes, wondering who was going to make the first move.". By the time Kane graduated high school she had, what she describes as an "inferiority complex".

By the age of twenty, Kane had taken up residence on Skid Row, was living off social assistance, and was dependent on drugs and alcohol. Eventually, Kane was able to disentangle herself from her substance abuses, and move away from Skid Row and enroll in Edmonton's Grant McEwan College (MacEwan University) for performing arts; it was here that she excelled in dance, acting, and singing. Her performance at McEwan College led to scholarships with Banff School of Fine Arts and Circle in the Square Theatre Company in New York.

== Acting, teaching, and cultural work ==
Margo received national attention during the late 1970s with the play The Ecstasy of Rita Joe by George Ryga, performed at Citadel Theatre in Edmonton Alberta. During 1982, Kane toured with Prairie Theatre Exchange's production of The Ecstasy of Rita Joe. Margo has also involved herself with a national youth caravan which brought theatre to small Native communities across Canada.

During the 1980s, Kane became involved with the National Native Role Model Program, which highlights the accomplishments of ordinary First Nations, Metis, and Inuit Youth. Through this program, Kane went to Prisons, recovery centres, and group homes. It was around this time that she landed a small part on the CBC's First Nations TV series, Spirit Bay, in which she was cast as the school teacher.

Margo became the "first Native artistic director of Spirit Song Native Theatre School in the 1980s". It was here that she realized that she was teaching performance more than performing herself. "I realized there weren’t a whole lot of roles for me out there – particularly since I was too old to be an ingenue and too young to be an interesting old lady" (Kane). She used her experience as a "cultural worker" to create roles for herself. Most of her work is autobiographical. She is probably best known for her acclaimed solo-voice drama Moonlodge which has toured for over ten years. Her performances blend traditional ritual with storytelling, song, poetry, and dance. A list of her most notable works can be found below.

Kane won a Canadian Achievement Award from the National Capital Commission in Ottawa in 1991.

== Full Circle: First Nations Performance ==
Full Circle: First Nations Performance is Kane's own theatre company; it was established in 1992 by Kane, who fulfills the role of managing and artistic director. The mandate for the theatre company is to "create opportunities for Aboriginal artists, writers and performers to express the reality of First Nations experiences and to work in harmony with First Nations traditions while engaging modern, interdisciplinary theatrical techniques". Collaboration and Networking are integral to Full Circle's mandate; much of what is produced is a collaborative effort of the artists involved.

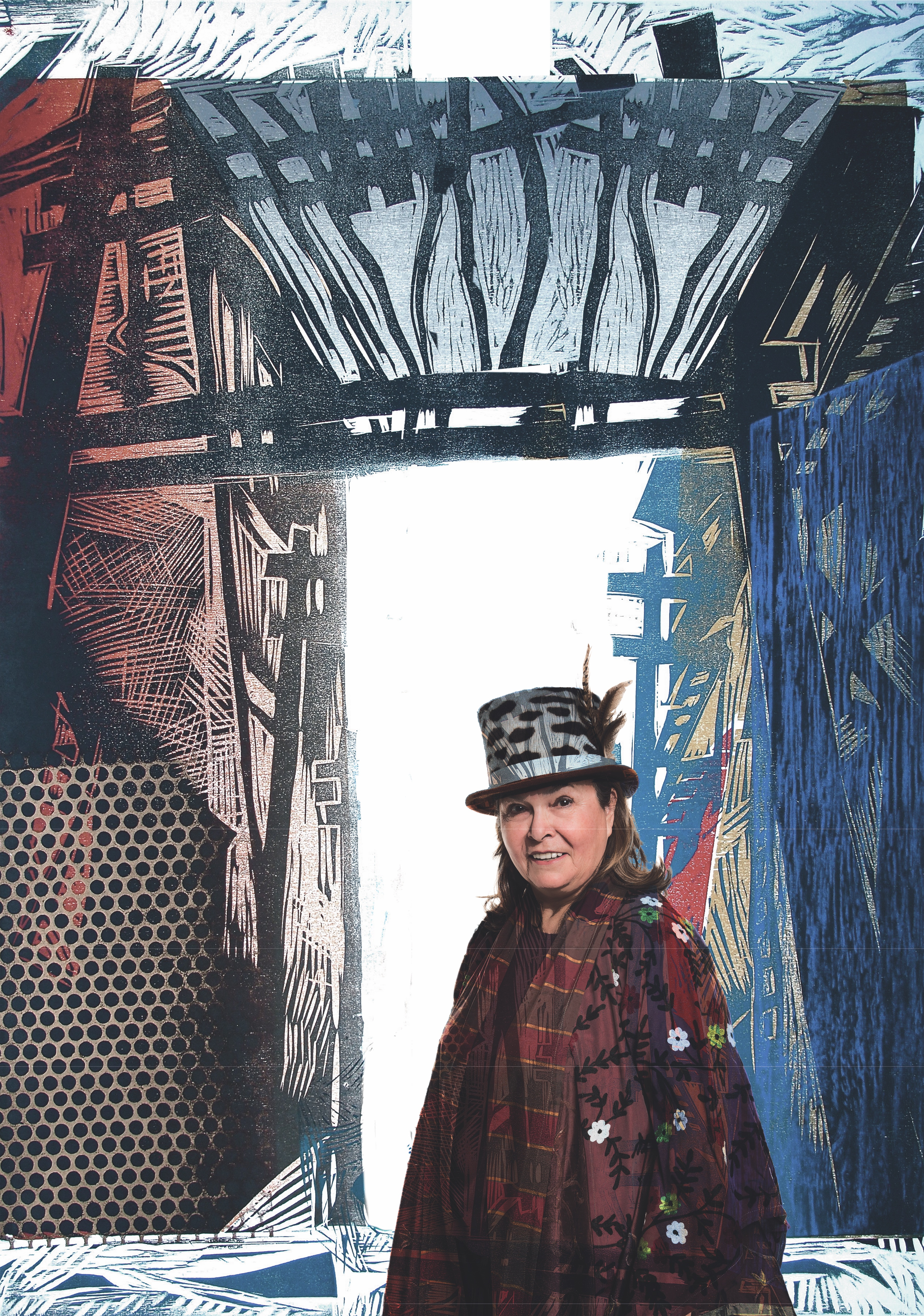
Kane in 2016

Full Circle puts on an annual event called Talking Stick Festival, which hopes to "establish a unique showcase for talented, emerging and professional artists, to engage Aboriginal cultural communities, and to introduce Vancouver's many audiences to contemporary Aboriginal artistic practices." The Theatre Company has also proven itself a leader among other theatre companies through its various workshops, training projects, and performance opportunities.

== Kane and solo-voice theatre ==
Solo-voice theatre (also known as monodrama, or singular voice theatre) is a style of theatre performance rooted in storytelling and other oral traditions. It is a theatrical piece acted or designed to be acted by a single actor, usually playing a single part; however, not all solo-voice/monodrama pieces have just one character. Moonlodge is an excellent example of solo-voice which requires the transformation from one character to another, often interacting with each other. Kane's use of solo-voice mixes various techniques and styles of theatre including storytelling, ritual, dance, and mime. It is through movement, mimicry, voice changes and intricate use of stage properties that she is able to accomplish these character transformations.

== Moonlodge ==
Kane has said that she "hoped that Moonlodge will be a part of the healing of our people. We have survived tremendous losses with a sense of humour, dignity and honour. We are capable of determining our own future and that of our children."

=== Plot ===
Agnes is a girl snatched from her home and family by Child Welfare government services. She grows up in a series of foster homes, apart from the warmth and support of her family and her cultural community. Popular media depicting Aboriginal people both entice and repel Agnes. Later, in the 1960s she joins many others hitchhiking across America and in that journey she begins to discover the authentic voice inside her that had been silenced but never lost.

=== Inspiration ===
Kane wrote Moonlodge as a tribute to the women in her life that have encouraged her, and who continue to encourage and guide her. While Moonlodge does not draw directly from Kane's childhood experiences, much of the content can seem biographical. Kane drew on stories and personal experiences of children who were displaced from their homes and families by the Children's Aid Department in the 1950s.

=== Performance history ===
Moonlodge premiered at the Women in View Festival in Vancouver in 1990. Since its premiere, the play has seen performances in Canada, the United States, Europe, and Australia. It has also been adapted for CBC radio in 1994.

"With nothing but a drum and suitcase for props, [Kane] weaves a spell that draws us all in, Natives and non-Natives together." - Jane Emson, The Kamloops Daily News

"Kane's storytelling is innately theatrical, her superb physicalization explanation of events and the colourful characters she meets on her journey places this production at the very top echelon of the solo-performer format. The 90-minute show has heart, charm and finesse, alongside a truth that cuts deep." -Festival of the Dreaming

== Writings and appearances ==
=== Plays and performance art ===
- Moonlodge – writer, actress - Premiered at Women In View Festival 1990
- Memories Springing/Waters Singing (Banff Centre, 1992) – environmental installation/performance piece
- Princess Minnehaha at the Tikki-Tikki Lounge (Vancouver 1992)
- Confessions of an Indian Cowboy – writer, actor
- The River-Home (Vancouver 1996) Performance Art Installation.

=== Appearances ===
- Running Brave (1983) - Catherine
- Spirit Bay (1985) - school teacher
- Higher Ground (1988) - Mala Bremer
- Powwow Highway (1989) - Imogen
- Good Things Too (1996)
- Dreamkeeper (2003) - Cross Clan Mother
- On the Corner (2003) - Dolly
- Unnatural & Accidental (2006) - Mavis
- Rustic Oracle (2019) - Iris
