= Joshua's Confusion =

1977 American children's television special

- Written by: Tom Robertson
- Directed by: Tom Robertson
- Starring: Tim Rail as Joshua; Charles Coetz as Joshua's Father; Nancy Neal as Joshua's Mother
- Narrated by: Jack Gwyn
- Country of origin: United States

Production
- Producer: Tom Robertson
- Production location: Cincinnati, Ohio
- Editor: John Gunselman
- Running time: 23 minutes
- Production company: Multimedia Program Productions

Original release
- Network: WLWT-TV
- Release: October 2, 1977

Joshua’s Confusion is a 1977 children's television special produced by Multimedia Program Productions. It is part of a series called Young People's Specials, a series of specials locally produced in Cincinnati that tackled cultural issues through the lenses of children. The special originally aired on WLWT-TV, but would be syndicated in other areas, including on Nickelodeon's Special Delivery. The film was produced with help from the Amish community of Berlin, Ohio.

== Plot ==
The special follows Joshua, an Amish boy who gets invited to a sleepover by one of his friends at school. His parents forbid Joshua from going since it goes against their beliefs. Joshua sneaks out of his bedroom window and goes to the party anyway. Throughout the party, Joshua thinks about what his father told him as he plays with the kids. Joshua’s parents find out Joshua left and pick him up. On the way home, Joshua jumps out of their buggy and retreats into the woods. Joshua sleeps in the woods and the special ends with him returning home the next day.

== Awards ==
In 1977, Joshua's Confusion won a Peabody Award for Children's & Youth. Charles Goetz won a regional Emmy for his role as Joshua's Father.
