= Spirit Bay =

Canadian television series

- Genre: Family drama
- Country of origin: Canada
- No. of seasons: 1
- No. of episodes: 13

Production
- Running time: 30 minutes
- Production company: The Film Works

Original release
- Network: CBC

Spirit Bay is a Canadian family drama television series of 13 half-hour episodes that aired on CBC Television and TVOntario from 1982 to 1987. The show focuses on the lives of First Nations townsfolk on an Ojibwe reservation town near MacDiarmid, Ontario. Here, the residents have adapted to white society while retaining traditional links to the land through fishing, trapping and hunting. The show details the spiritual kinship between Spirit Bay families, nature, and modern life on the reserve from a young person's viewpoint. Being the first true aboriginal television series, it set the stage for all other native Canadian programming thereafter (such as The Rez, North of 60 and Moccasin Flats), and paved the way for many famous First Nations Canadian actors. Episodes were rebroadcast in the United States on Nickelodeon's Special Delivery.

== Notable actors ==
- Trevor 'Tre' Smith as "Rabbit"
- Graham Greene as Pete "Baba" Green
- Tom Jackson as Will Littlebear
- Tantoo Cardinal as Rabbit's foster mother Annie
- Gary Farmer as Hack's uncle Cheemo
- Shirley Cheechoo as Elton and Tonka's mother
- Monique Mojica as Mavis and Hack's mother Gloria
- Margo Kane as the school teacher Mrs. Walker

Lesser known elder actors included:

- Gladys Taylor as Teawash
- Colleen Loucks as Aunt Lily Shebagabow
- Ron Cook as Baba Shebagabow (Minnow and Tafia's father)
- Blake Debassige as Annie's husband Ron
- Doris Linklater as Pete's wife Connie Green
- Peter Krantz as Coleman (Hack's Uncle)

Noted elder aboriginal actor George Clutesi (who played Old Bernard) appeared in two episodes. In one, he helps Hack deal with the importance of an ancestral medicine bag, and in the other he teaches Tafia the true value of art.

== Child actors from the series ==
One of the child stars of the show was Trevor Smith, who played Rabbit, a young teen who comes to the reserve from the city after he is adopted. Other child actors on the show included:

- Cynthia Debassige as Tafia Shebagabow
- Diane Debassige as Mavis
- Lance Migwans as Hack
- Eugene Thompson as Minnow Shebagabow
- Liza Haldane as Lenore Green
- Mark Bruder as Elton (older brother of Tonka)
- Kim Boucher as Rose
- Cheri Maracle as Ruth
- Sarah Williams as Sadie Green
- Julie Beaulieu as Mary

== Theme music ==
The theme song was penned by Canadian music and acting legend Buffy Sainte Marie.

== Production ==
The show began production in 1980.The show was shot on location in MacDiarmid, Ontario on Lake Nipigon at the Rocky Bay First Nation. There was also a set on Thunder Bay.

== Legacy ==
A modern school in Rocky Bay has been named the Spirit Bay School after the series. As well, the new community gas station has also been named "Spirit Bay".

== Episodes ==
No.	Title
1	"A Time To Be Brave"
Tafia has to overcome her fear of trains to help her father survive in the dead of winter.
2	"Rabbit Goes Fishing"
Ralph (aka Rabbit), a young orphan from the city, is aloof and unfriendly when he arrives in Spirit Bay. But the kind Cheemo discovers that the boy's false bravado stems from fear of rejection he has experienced in many foster homes. Cheemo convinces Ralph on a fishing trip that he is with his own people and at home.
3	"A Real Kid"
Rabbit finds out that his foster mother, Annie, is pregnant, and he runs away for fear he will be ignored.
4	"The Blueberry Bicycle"
Elton uses his money to get spare parts for his bike from elder Teawash, and by doing so learns a valuable lesson in the town's bike race.
5	"Words on a Page"
Lenore writes a story that could win her a scholarship in the city, but her father is reluctant to let her enter it in a contest.
6	"Circle of Life"
The kids find a native skeleton on an island. When a museum comes and take the bones to Thunder Bay the community is outraged; however, they find a way to bring them back for a proper ceremonial burial.
7	"Hack's Choice"
Hack's uncle Cole, a former WHA hockey pro, comes back to Spirit Bay to try to weasel him out of his father's medicine bag so he can sell it to collectors.
8	"Rabbit Pulls His Weight"
Rabbit literally pulls his weight when he helps out a pilot whose plane has crashed back in the snowy bush.
9	"Hot News"
Mavis and her cousin Mary want to write an article about an old Indian recipe, but end up fighting with one another in their canoe while a dangerous forest fire lingers nearby.
10	"Big Save"
Spirit Bay's broomball team gets stranded in a blizzard and Rose has to use her survival know-how to save the kids.
11	"Dancing Feathers"
Tafia is taken to Toronto where she learns the importance of the annual pow wow festival.
12	"The Pride of Spirit Bay"
Tafia learns the value of true art from her elders.
13	"Water Magic"
Cheemo, the fisherman, must pay $1500 by the end of the week, or lose his boat. Teawash, the wise old woman, warns him and his helpers to remember to leave something for the Memagwasis- the little people. The boys ridicule Teawash, and later scoff when Cheemo gives back fish to the spirit of the lake.
