= Paul Julian (artist) =

American background artist (1914–1995)

- Born: Paul Hull Julian; June 25, 1914; Illinois, U.S.
- Died: September 5, 1995 (aged 81); Van Nuys, California, U.S.
- Occupations: Animator, artist, voice actor
- Years active: 1939–1995
- Employer(s): Warner Bros. Cartoons (1939–1941; 1945–1951); UPA (1941–1945; 1951–1964); Hanna-Barbera (1964–1968; 1974–1991); Sanrio (1978); Ruby-Spears (1983–1984)
- Known for: Voice of Road Runner

Paul Hull Julian (June 25, 1914 – September 5, 1995) was an American background animator, sound effects artist and voice actor for Warner Bros. Cartoons. He worked on Looney Tunes short films, primarily on director Friz Freleng's Sylvester and Tweety Bird shorts.

During his time at Warner, Julian also provided the vocal effects of the Road Runner. His warm and tightly cropped urban scenes were also featured early in his career in the Bugs Bunny film Baseball Bugs (1946), and in the crime syndicate-themed Daffy Duck film Golden Yeggs (1950). Julian also created New Deal murals in California. Julian died in Van Nuys, California, at the age of 81.

== Life and career ==
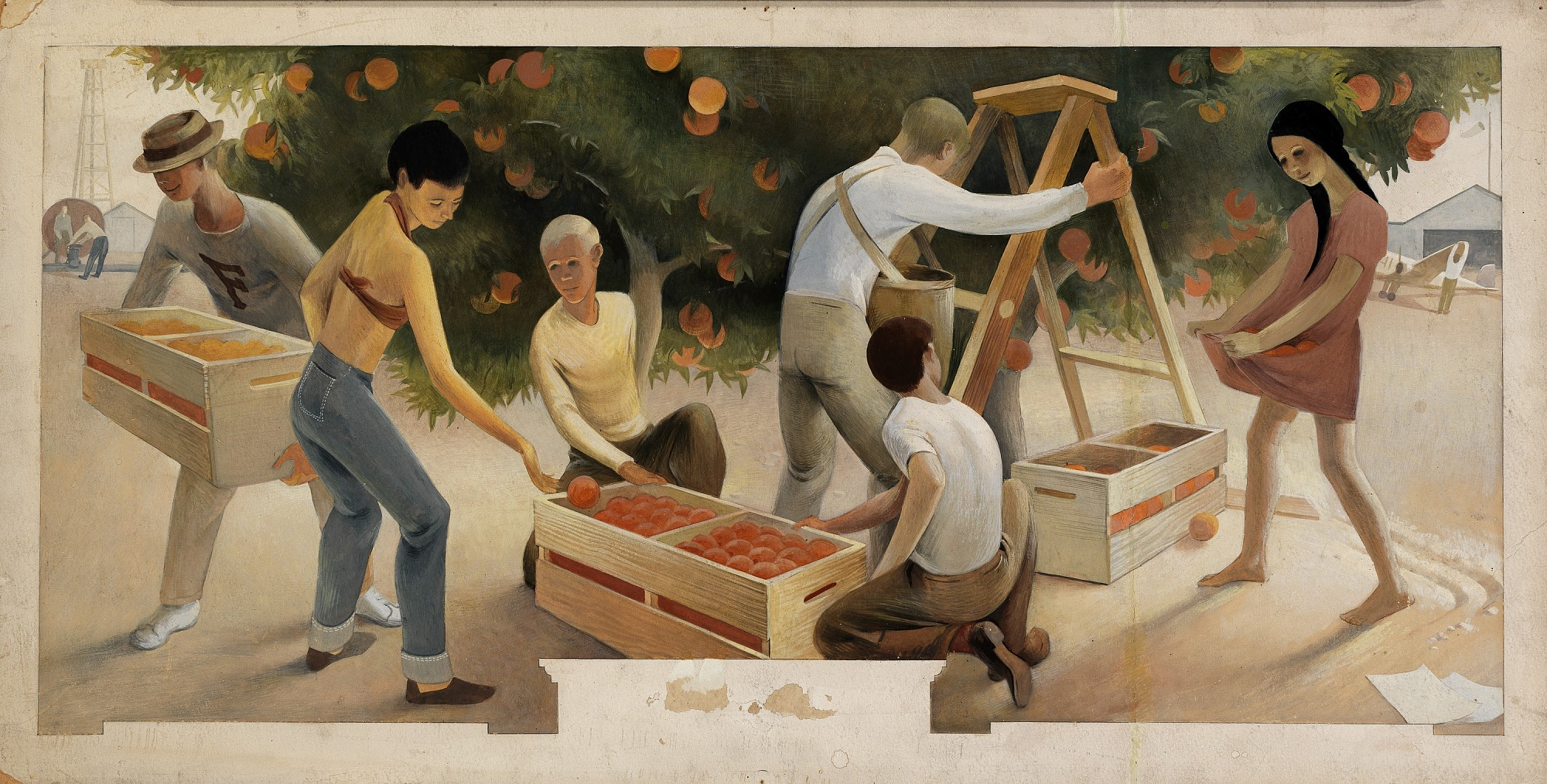
Study for Julian's mural Orange Picking (1942), commissioned by the Section of Painting and Sculpture for the post office in Fullerton, California

Julian was born on June 25, 1914, in Illinois. In October 1939, he landed a job in Los Angeles as layout and background artist at Leon Schlesinger's animation studio, "Termite Terrace". Two years later, he was one of the early staff members of UPA. In 1945, he returned to Warner Bros. Cartoons, where he was mainly assigned primarily to Friz Freleng's unit, he became highly regarded for his colourful, modernist city-scape paintings for Sylvester and Tweety cartoons, as well as for Bugs Bunny and Daffy Duck shorts.

Julian worked on New Deal mural projects all around Southern California prior to beginning his career in Hollywood. In 1942 his mural Orange Picking was created for the interior of the Fullerton, California, post office. That year he also created a WPA mural for the Upland Elementary School in Upland, California, at the side of the school auditorium. Though faded, the murals are in decent shape. Julian used a technique called petrachrome that utilized 24 different colors of marble to complete the mural's four panels. The mural inside the Fullerton Post Office is in excellent condition.

Later, while working at Warner Bros. as a background artist, Julian provided the Road Runner's "Beep-Beep!" sound. Julian first made the sound in hallways on the Warner Bros. studio lot. He imitated a car horn to signal people to get out of his way when he was in a hurry with a large painting. The sound was noticed by director Chuck Jones and used in the first Wile E. Coyote and Road Runner short Fast and Furry-ous in 1949. It was sped up by editor Treg Brown. These recordings are still in use in modern Looney Tunes media.

Julian directed the animated films Baby Boogie (1955) for UPA, and The Hangman (1964), which was produced by Les Goldman. The short garnered over 15 international film festival awards. He also was a background and production designer for Hanna-Barbera and for the 1978 anime fantasy Winds of Change, based on Ovid's Metamorphoses. Julian also had a long working relationship with Roger Corman providing artwork for many of his movies, including Dementia 13, directed by Francis Ford Coppola, and The Terror.

Julian was still working as an artist when he died in Van Nuys, California, in 1995.

== Partial filmography ==
=== Background artist ===
- That's Warner Bros.!
- FernGully: The Last Rainforest
- My Little Pony: The Movie
- Hare Trigger
- I Taw a Putty Tat
- Elmer's Candid Camera
- Elmer's Pet Rabbit

=== Actor ===
- Soup or Sonic - The Road Runner
- Fast and Furry-ous - The Road Runner
- Sugar and Spies - The Road Runner
- The Road Runner Show - The Road Runner
- Freeze Frame - The Road Runner
- Boulder Wham! - The Road Runner
- Chariots of Fur - The Road Runner (last cartoon produced in Paul Julian's lifetime)
- Coyote Falls - The Road Runner
- Fur of Flying - The Road Runner
- Rabid Rider - The Road Runner
- Flash in the Pain - The Road Runner
- Chaser on the Rocks - The Road Runner
- Hopalong Casualty - The Road Runner
- Going! Going! Gosh! - The Road Runner
- Ready, Set, Zoom! - The Road Runner
- Zoom and Bored - The Road Runner
- Hare-Breadth Hurry - Bugs Bunny imitating the Road Runner
- Dexter's Laboratory (S02E11B: "Road Rash") - Dee-Dee imitating the Road Runner
- Tiny Toon Adventures: How I Spent My Vacation - The Road Runner
- Space Jam - The Road Runner
- Looney Tunes: Back in Action - The Road Runner
- Bah, Humduck! A Looney Tunes Christmas - The Road Runner
- Space Jam: A New Legacy - The Road Runner
- Family Guy (S01E2: "I Never Met the Dead Man") - The Road Runner
- The Simpsons (S19E15: "Smoke on the Daughter") - Maggie Simpson imitating the Road Runner
- Seth MacFarlane's Cavalcade of Cartoon Comedy (episode: "Die Sweet Roadrunner, Die") - The Road Runner
- Bugs Bunny's Bustin' Out All Over - The Road Runner
- The Electric Company - The Road Runner
- Zip Zip Hooray! - The Road Runner
- Zipping Along - The Road Runner
- The Looney Tunes Show - The Road Runner
- New Looney Tunes - The Road Runner
- Looney Tunes Cartoons - The Road Runner
- Bugs Bunny Builders - The Road Runner
- Tiny Toons Looniversity - The Road Runner and Little Beeper
- Zig & Sharko (episode: "Run Sharko, Run!") - Zig imitating the Road Runner
- Coyote vs. Acme - The Road Runner
