= The Cricket in Times Square =

1960 children's book by George Selden

- First edition
- Author: George Selden
- Illustrator: Garth Williams
- Cover artist: Garth Williams
- Language: English
- Series: The Cricket in Times Square series
- Genre: Children's
- Publisher: Ariel Books
- Publication date: 1960
- Publication place: United States
- Media type: Print
- LC Class: PZ7.T37154
- Followed by: Tucker's Countryside

The Cricket in Times Square is a 1960 children's book by George Selden and illustrated by Garth Williams. It won a Newbery Honor in 1961.

Selden gave this explanation of what was the initial idea for the book:

One night I was coming home on the subway, and I did hear a cricket chirp in Times Square. The story formed in my mind within minutes. An author is very thankful for minutes like those, although they happen all too infrequently.

== Plot ==
On an early summer evening, Mario Bellini finds a cricket chirping near his parents' newsstand in the Times Square subway station. Papa Bellini allows Mario to keep the cricket in the newsstand as a pet despite Mama Bellini's fear that the cricket will attract more bugs.

The cricket's name is Chester. That evening, Chester meets Tucker Mouse and Harry Cat, best friends who live in an abandoned drainpipe near the newsstand. Chester tells them that he is from Connecticut and that he came to New York by being accidentally trapped in a picnic basket. Tucker and Harry show him Times Square, which he finds overwhelming.

Mr. Smedley, a music teacher who is a regular customer of the Bellinis, hears Chester chirping and likens the cricket to Orpheus. Mario takes Chester to Chinatown and buys a cricket cage from a shop owner named Sai Fong. While dreaming that night, Chester eats half of a two-dollar bill. The Bellinis decide that Chester must stay in his cage until Mario repays the two dollars. To free Chester, Tucker donates his life's savings, a collection of coins scrounged from the subway station. Mario realizes that he has been feeding Chester the wrong kind of food. He takes Chester to see Sai Fong, who from then on provides Chester a steady supply of mulberry leaves.

Two months after Chester's arrival in Times Square, he hosts a dinner party for Tucker and Harry in the newsstand. They turn on the radio, and to Tucker and Harry's delight, Chester begins imitating the songs. Tucker dances and accidentally knocks over a box of matches, setting the newsstand on fire. Mama Bellini blames the fire on Chester and demands that he go. Chester, saddened, chirps one of the songs he heard on the radio. The song is Mama Bellini's favorite, and she sings along. She relents and allows Chester to stay.

That night, Chester listens to the radio to learn more human music. The following morning, Chester chirps for Mr. Smedley, who is so impressed he writes a letter to the music editor of The New York Times. The letter attracts crowds to the newsstand. Chester gives twice daily concerts, but by Thursday, he is exhausted and decides to retire. On Friday evening, he performs a farewell concert. For his final encore, he plays the sextet from Lucia di Lammermoor, and the whole city pauses to listen.

Chester and Mario play together for the last time. Mario falls asleep. Chester takes the bell from his cricket cage. Tucker and Harry bring Chester to Grand Central Station. When Mario wakes, he realizes that Chester has left for home, and he feels glad. Tucker suggests to Harry that they visit Connecticut next summer.

== Adaptations ==
In 1971, Miller-Brody Productions recorded a dramatization of the book for Newbery Award Records. Narrated by William Griffis, the dramatization featured Herb Duncan as Tucker, Lionel Wilson as Chester, Earl Hammond as Harry, Scott Jacoby as Mario, Bryna Raeburn as Mama and John (Red) Kullers as Papa.

In 1973, Chuck Jones wrote and directed a short animated version of The Cricket in Times Square with Mel Blanc cast as the voice of Tucker Mouse and Paul; Les Tremayne as the voices of Chester Cricket, Harry Cat, Papa Bellini, and Mr. Smedley; June Foray as Mama Bellini; and Kerry MacLane as Mario. The special aired on ABC on April 24, 1973.

Jones also wrote and directed two animated sequels, A Very Merry Cricket (1973) and Yankee Doodle Cricket (1975).

== Sequels ==
Selden wrote six sequels to the book: Tucker's Countryside (1969), Harry Cat's Pet Puppy (1974), Chester Cricket's Pigeon Ride (1981), Chester Cricket's New Home (1983), Harry Kitten and Tucker Mouse (1986), and The Old Meadow (1987). Furthermore, in 2011 Macmillan released three Harry Cat and Tucker Mouse books by Thea Feldman based on characters in The Cricket in Times Square: Harry to the Rescue!, Starring Harry, and Tucker's Beetle Band.
