= Operation: Rabbit =

1952 film by Chuck Jones

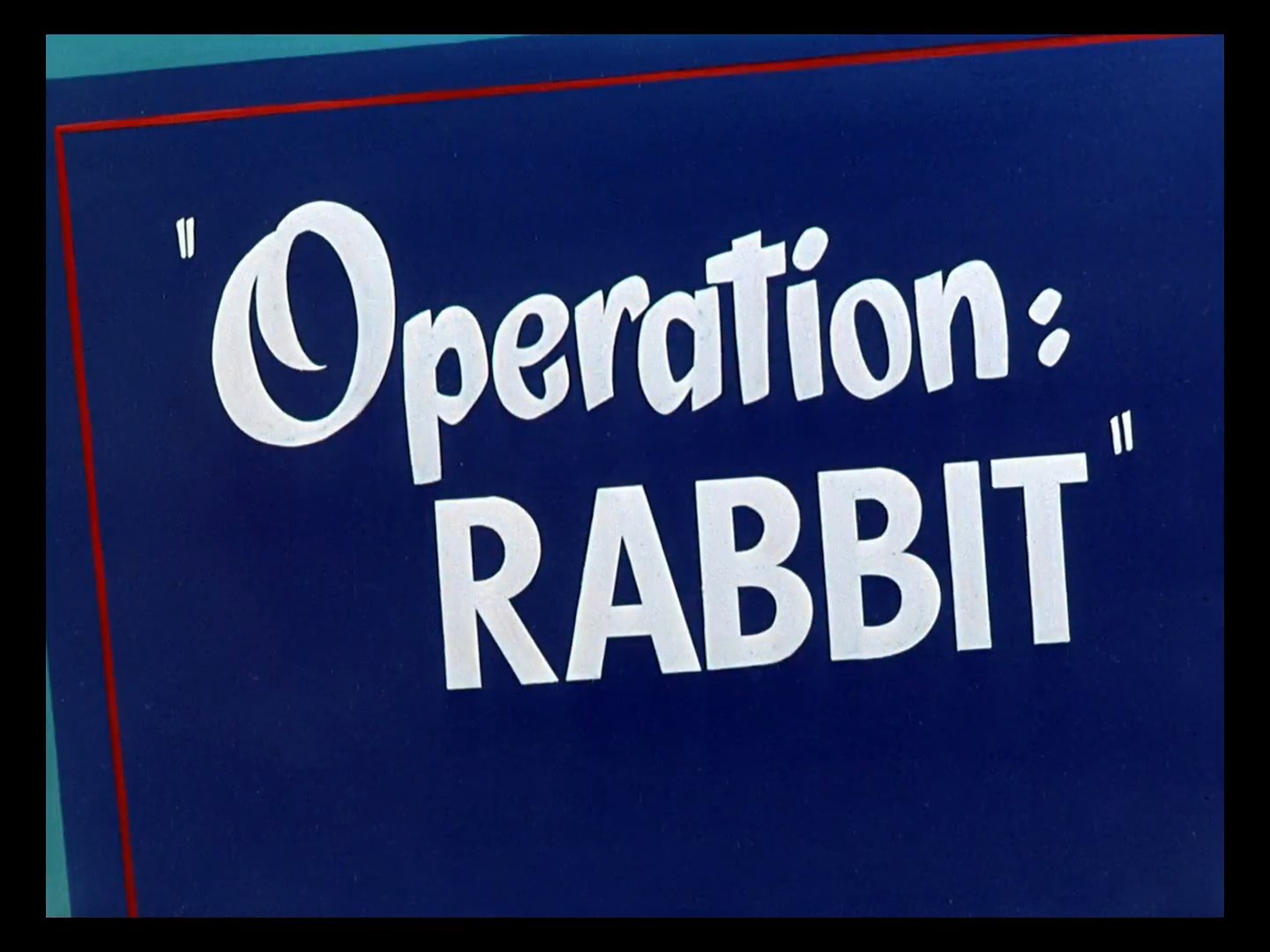
- Title card
- Directed by: Charles M. Jones
- Story by: Michael Maltese
- Starring: Mel Blanc
- Music by: Carl Stalling
- Animation by: Lloyd Vaughan; Ben Washam; Ken Harris; Phil Monroe
- Layouts by: Robert Gribbroek
- Backgrounds by: Philip DeGuard
- Color process: Technicolor
- Production company: Warner Bros. Cartoons
- Distributed by: Warner Bros. Pictures; The Vitaphone Corporation
- Release date: January 19, 1952
- Running time: 7:19
- Language: English

Operation: Rabbit is a 1952 Warner Bros. Looney Tunes animated cartoon directed by Chuck Jones. The cartoon was released on January 19, 1952, and features Bugs Bunny and Wile E. Coyote. This marks the second appearance of Wile E. Coyote, the first where he is named, and the first where he has spoken dialogue.

== Plot ==
Wile E. Coyote endeavors to capture Bugs Bunny. At first, Coyote's audacious declaration of superiority over Bugs, touting his intellect and physical prowess. Despite Coyote's bravado, Bugs remains unfazed, deploying his quick wit to outsmart his adversary at every turn.

Coyote first attempts to cook Bugs directly in his burrow with a pressure-cooking lid, but Bugs digs out another hole, traps Coyote's head under the lid, and wallops him with a heavy club. He then tries to shoot a pipe-directed cannon at Bugs, only for Bugs to redirect back with another pipe through his burrow. Bugs then feigns surrender and gives Coyote a stick of dynamite thinly disguised as a pen to sign his will; Coyote sees through the ruse and extinguishes it, but is blown up by a second fuse on the other end. Coyote sends in an explosive female robot rabbit after Bugs, but falls for Bugs' identical trick with a robot female coyote and is blown up by both robots. Proclaiming his "masterpiece" as a last resort, he launches an explosive saucer drone set to explode on visual contact with a rabbit. However, Bugs quickly dons a chicken mask, and somehow creates an extra setting on the drone by simply writing "coyote" on the dial, causing the drone to return to Wile E.'s laboratory, destroying the entire cliffside plateau.

The climax of the cartoon involves Coyote attempting to ensnare Bugs with explosive-laced carrots. Unbeknownst to him, Bugs is moving the shed in which he is working onto railroad tracks into the path of an oncoming train. As Coyote strokes his own ego proclaiming himself a "Super Genius", he realizes too late what has happened. He looks forlornly at the audience and pulls down the shed's window shade in futility, just before the shed is destroyed in a catastrophic explosion, leaving him hanging from a branch on a high cliff. When a humbled and battered Coyote somewhat regains his bearings, he concedes defeat, symbolically acknowledging his own ineptitude by returning to Bugs' burrow, shakily proclaiming "Allow me to introduce myself, my name is 'Mud'", before flopping backwards in exhaustion. Bugs delivers a final quip to the audience: "...And remember: 'Mud' spelled backwards is 'dum(b)'".

== Production ==
This was the second cartoon to feature Wile E. Coyote (following 1949's Fast and Furry-ous), and the first in which he is identified by his full name. It is also the first in which the Coyote speaks; his voice, like Bugs, was provided by Mel Blanc. The two characters would reappear together in the cartoons To Hare Is Human (1956), Rabbit's Feat (1960), Compressed Hare (1961), and Hare-Breadth Hurry (1963).

== Home video ==
The short was released on the Looney Tunes Golden Collection: Volume 4 DVD set, and the Looney Tunes Platinum Collection: Volume 3 Blu-ray set.

| Preceded by Big Top Bunny | Bugs Bunny Cartoons; 1952 | Succeeded by Foxy by Proxy |
