= Phil Kaye =

American poet

- Occupations: Writer, poet
- Notable work: A Light Bulb Symphony (2011); Date & Time (2018)
- Website: philkaye.com

Phil Kaye is a Japanese-American poet, writer and filmmaker. He is the co-director of Project VOICE, and writes and performs as a spoken word artist both in solo and group projects. Kaye is the author of two books, A Light Bulb Symphony (2011) and Date & Time (2018).

== Life ==
Phil Kaye was born in California to a Japanese mother and Jewish-American father. As a child, Kaye spoke almost exclusively Japanese in his home until age five, when he was sent to American kindergarten. Kaye's family, along with his Japanese and Jewish heritage, are recurring themes in his later work.

Kaye began performing spoken word poetry at the age of seventeen. Kaye first discovered spoken word poetry at seventeen years old while attending the Student Diversity Leadership Conference. Kaye went on to attend college at Brown University, where he joined a poetry club and eventually made the National Poetry Slam Finals in 2011.

At Brown University, Kaye met Sarah Kay and the two began performing duet poems together. The two currently act as co-directors of Project VOICE, an organization that partners with schools to bring live poetry performances and workshops to the classroom.

In addition to his poetry, Kaye is a former teacher of weekly poetry workshops in maximum security prisons. He was named head coordinator of Space in Prisons for the Arts and Creative Expression (SPACE), an organization that provided free arts workshops to incarcerated populations.

Kaye currently lives in New York City, working as a writer, performer and co-director of Project VOICE.

== Poetry ==
Phil Kaye writes and performs poetry for audiences around the world. In 2015 Kaye opened for the Dalai Lama as a part of his 80th birthday celebration. He has also performed on NPR and at the Museum of Modern Art in New York City. Since 2008, Kaye has performed and taught at hundreds of schools and venues in twenty different countries. He has also written and performed poetry duets with partners including Sarah Kay.

During his time at Brown University, Kaye both performed for and coached the Brown University National College Poetry Slam (CUPSI) Team. He twice received the National College Poetry Slam (CUPSI) award for “Pushing the Art Forward”, given for outstanding innovation in the art of performance poetry. At the time, he was the only person who had won the award as both a performer and coach.

In summer of 2017, Kaye and Sarah Kay collaborated with Japanese brand Uniqlo to feature lines of their spoken word poetry on t-shirts in a clothing line called, “Poetry Beyond the Page.” It was the first collaboration between Uniqlo and poets. On Kaye and Kay’s request, a portion of the proceeds were donated to art education subsidies for low-resourced schools.

In 2019, The New Yorker wrote a feature piece about Kaye and Sarah Kay's work together, titled Spoken Word Poetry's Dynamic Duo. The piece, chronicling the events of a sold-out show in New York City, highlighted their poetry work, tour schedule, and organization, Project VOICE.

== Books ==
Kaye released his first poetry collection A Light Bulb Symphony in 2011, which covered themes including his family life, ancestry, and stories from his grandfathers. In 2018, Kaye’s second book Date & Time was ranked on an Amazon bestseller list. Date & Time received praise for its exploration of themes related to memory, family, and loneliness.

== Film ==
In 2018, Kaye was a writer, producer and actor in Distance, an experimental series about a long distance relationship told from two distinct perspectives. Distance was recommended by The New York Times, Time Out Magazine and Paste Magazine. Distance was released online after an award-winning festival run including South by Southwest, New York Television Festival, and SeriesFest, where it received a Virgin-Produced Choice Award.

Kaye has worked with filmmaker Alex Dobrenko under the moniker “Thanks Laura”. The two have worked as co-creators, directors, writers, and actors. The team has produced a number of short films together, including satirical shorts “The Shake”, featured in The Huffington Post, “The Bad Boys of Food”, featured in Food 52 and The Huffington Post.
