= Bugs Bunny's Bustin' Out All Over =

1980 TV special

- Genre: Animation; Comedy; Short
- Directed by: Chuck Jones
- Voices of: Mel Blanc; Paul Julian
- Theme music composer: Dean Elliott
- Country of origin: United States
- Original language: English

Production
- Producer: Chuck Jones
- Editor: Rich Harrison
- Running time: 23:45
- Production companies: Chuck Jones Enterprises; Warner Bros. Animation

Original release
- Network: CBS
- Release: May 21, 1980

Bugs Bunny's Bustin' Out All Over is a springtime-themed Looney Tunes animated television special which aired on CBS on May 21, 1980.

The special includes three new cartoons directed by Chuck Jones and Phil Monroe.

== Featured cartoons ==
The cartoon shorts include:

- Portrait of the Artist as a Young Bunny (Bugs Bunny, Elmer Fudd)
- Spaced Out Bunny (Bugs Bunny, Marvin the Martian)
- Soup or Sonic (Wile E. Coyote and the Road Runner)

== Credits ==
- Written, produced, and directed by Chuck Jones
- Co-direction: Phil Monroe
- Voice characterizations: Mel Blanc, Paul Julian
- Music: Dean Elliott

== Home video ==
The special is included as a special feature on the Looney Tunes Golden Collection: Volume 5 DVD box set.
