= The Abominable Snow Rabbit =

1961 animated short film by Chuck Jones

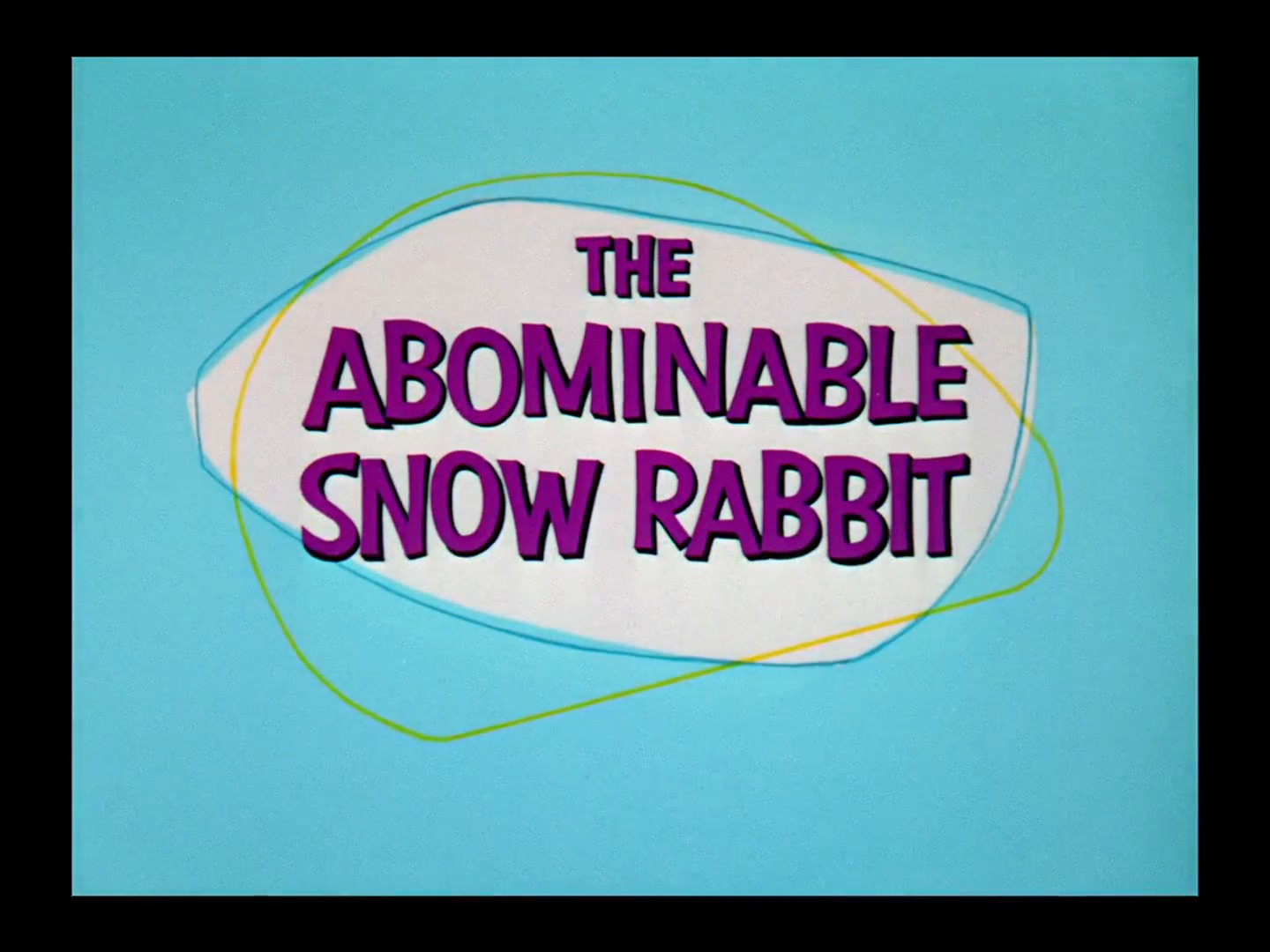
- Title card
- Directed by: Chuck Jones; Maurice Noble
- Story by: Tedd Pierce
- Produced by: William Orcutt; David H. DePatie
- Starring: Mel Blanc (all voices)
- Edited by: Treg Brown
- Music by: Milt Franklyn
- Animation by: Ken Harris; Tom Ray; Richard Thompson; Bob Bransford; David R. Green
- Layouts by: Maurice Noble
- Backgrounds by: Philip DeGuard
- Color process: Technicolor
- Production company: Warner Bros. Cartoons
- Distributed by: Warner Bros. Pictures; The Vitaphone Corporation
- Release date: May 20, 1961
- Running time: 7 minutes
- Language: English

The Abominable Snow Rabbit is a 1961 Warner Bros. Looney Tunes theatrical cartoon directed by Chuck Jones and co-directed by Maurice Noble, with a story by Tedd Pierce. The short was released on May 20, 1961, and stars Bugs Bunny and Daffy Duck.

== Plot ==
Bugs and Daffy tunnel through the Himalayan mountains instead of their intended destination, Palm Springs, California. Daffy, frustrated by the situation, decides to return to Perth Amboy. Meanwhile, underground, Daffy encounters a Yeti named Hugo, who mistakes him for a rabbit and gives him affectionate yet bone-crushing hugs. Daffy, desperate to escape, directs Hugo towards Bugs, who also falls victim to Hugo's overwhelming displays of affection.

After a series of misunderstandings, Bugs manages to evade Hugo and leads him on a chase underground, with Daffy following closely behind. Eventually, they all end up in Palm Springs, where Bugs and Daffy trick Hugo into believing Daffy is a rabbit again. However, the intense heat causes Hugo to melt away, leaving behind only a puddle. Bugs remarks on Hugo's true nature about being a snowman, while Daffy, soaked from the melting snow, remarks, "Abominable, that is."

== Voice cast ==
- Mel Blanc as Bugs Bunny, Daffy Duck, and Hugo

== Production notes ==
The Abominable Snow Rabbit is named after the phrase and horror film The Abominable Snowman. It marks Chuck Jones' last original theatrical cartoon featuring Daffy Duck.

== Home media ==
VHS:

- Looney Tunes After Dark
- Bugs Bunny: Big Top Bunny
- To Grandmother's House We Go

DVD: Looney Tunes Golden Collection: Volume 5

== See also ==
- List of American films of 1961
- List of Bugs Bunny cartoons
- List of Daffy Duck cartoons

| Preceded by Lighter Than Hare | Bugs Bunny Cartoons; 1961 | Succeeded by Compressed Hare |
