= Compressed Hare =

1961 film by Chuck Jones

- Lobby card
- Directed by: Chuck Jones; Maurice Noble
- Story by: Dave Detiege
- Produced by: William Orcutt; David H. DePatie
- Starring: Mel Blanc (all voices)
- Edited by: Treg Brown
- Music by: Milt Franklyn
- Animation by: Bob Bransford; Ken Harris; Richard Thompson; Tom Ray; Effects Animation: Harry Love
- Layouts by: Corny Cole; Maurice Noble (uncredited)
- Backgrounds by: Philip DeGuard; William Butler
- Color process: Technicolor
- Production company: Warner Bros. Cartoons
- Distributed by: Warner Bros. Pictures; The Vitaphone Corporation
- Release date: July 29, 1961
- Running time: 7 minutes
- Country: United States
- Language: English

Compressed Hare, stylized as COMpressed Hare, is a 1961 Merrie Melodies cartoon directed by Chuck Jones and Maurice Noble. The short was released on July 29, 1961, and stars Bugs Bunny and Wile E. Coyote. This is the final first-run Golden Age short in which Wile E. Coyote speaks, although he speaks again in the Adventures of the Road Runner featurette a year later. The title is a play on compressed air.

== Plot ==
In the narrative involving Wile E. Coyote and Bugs Bunny, a sequence of comedic encounters unfolds as Coyote endeavors to capture and prepare Bugs Bunny as a meal. The plot initiates with Coyote's subtle ploy, leaving a telephone in Bugs Bunny's hole and soliciting a cup of diced carrots. Bugs, perceptive to Coyote's intentions, engages in a playful exchange before finding himself ensnared by Coyote, who is preparing rabbit stew.

Bugs escapes after causing a fold-out bed to fall on the Coyote's head. Coyote’s next attempts to ensnare Bugs Bunny involve an attempt to vacuum the rabbit out of his hole, shooting a cannon into the hole and pouring quick-drying cement into the hole. Finally, the Coyote throws a metal carrot into the hole. Once he hears the rabbit pretending to eat it, he turns on a giant electromagnet, which backfires as it pulls in metal objects from all over the world, including a rocket which causes a huge explosion. Bugs comments on Coyote's misfortune with witty quips, asserting his prowess as a neighbor.

Preceded by The Abominable Snow Rabbit	Bugs Bunny Cartoons; 1961	Succeeded by Prince Violent
