= Mowgli's Brothers (TV special) =

- Based on: The Jungle Book by Rudyard Kipling
- Written by: Chuck Jones
- Directed by: Chuck Jones
- Starring: Roddy McDowall; June Foray
- Music by: Dean Elliott
- Country of origin: United States
- Original language: English

Production
- Running time: 25 minutes

Original release
- Release: February 11, 1976

Mowgli's Brothers is a 1976 television animated special directed by American animator Chuck Jones. It is based on the first chapter of Rudyard Kipling's The Jungle Book. The special was narrated by Roddy McDowall, who also performs the voices of all the male characters in the film. June Foray was the voice of Raksha, the Mother Wolf. It originally aired on CBS on February 11, 1976.

The special was released on VHS, Betamax, and Laserdisc by Family Home Entertainment in 1985, and was released on VHS again in 1999 and on DVD in 2002 and 2007 by Lionsgate. Jones also directed adaptations of two other The Jungle Book stories, "Rikki-Tikki-Tavi" and "The White Seal", in 1975.

== Plot ==
Though largely a faithful adaptation of the story, there are some notable changes in Jones's version. Differences include expanded roles for Baloo and Tabaqui, and that Shere Khan is a white tiger without a lame leg.

== Reception ==
While researching for the special, Jones found out that Elsie Bambridge, Rudyard Kipling's daughter, was still alive. She expressed disdain for the 1967 Disney film, and praised Jones for pronouncing Mowgli's name properly.
