= Yankee Doodle Cricket =

1975 American TV special

- Written by: Chuck Jones; George Selden
- Directed by: Chuck Jones
- Starring: Les Tremayne; Mel Blanc; June Foray
- Music by: Dean Elliott
- Country of origin: United States
- Original language: English

Production
- Running time: 24 minutes

Original release
- Release: January 16, 1975

Yankee Doodle Cricket is a 1975 American television animated special directed by American animator Chuck Jones. June Foray was the voice of Marsha the Lightning Bug. It originally aired on ABC on January 16, 1975. The special was released on VHS and LaserDisc by Family Home Entertainment, and it was released on VHS again in 1999 and on DVD in 2002 and 2007 by Lionsgate Home Entertainment.

== Plot ==
The War of Independence has begun, and Tucker the Mouse, Harry the Cat and Chester C. Cricket are indispensable to the American colonies' effort to free themselves from the rule of the despotic English king. Harry and Tucker help Thomas Jefferson write the Declaration of Independence. Chester creates the tune for "Yankee Doodle Dandy". And all the animals—including John and Marsha, the lightning bugs—help Paul Revere spread the message that The British are coming.

== Cast ==
- Les Tremayne as Chester C. Cricket / Harry the Cat / John the Lightning Bug
- Mel Blanc as Tucker the Mouse / Rattlesnake / Bald Eagle
- June Foray as Marsha the Lightning Bug / Queen Bee
