= George Selden (author) =

American novelist

- Born: George Selden Thompson; May 14, 1929; Hartford, Connecticut, US
- Died: December 5, 1989 (aged 60); Greenwich Village, New York City
- Education: Bachelor of Arts
- Alma mater: Yale University
- Occupation: Writer
- Writing career
- Pen name: George Selden, Terry Andrews
- Language: English
- Period: 1961–1989
- Genre: Children's fiction
- Notable work: The Cricket in Times Square
- Notable awards: Newbery Honor Medal; Lewis Carroll Shelf Award

George Selden Thompson (May 14, 1929 – December 5, 1989) was an American author. Known professionally as George Selden, he also wrote under the pseudonym Terry Andrews. He is best known for his 1961 book The Cricket in Times Square, which received a Lewis Carroll Shelf Award in 1963 and a Newbery Honor.

== Biography ==
He was born in Hartford, Connecticut, to Dr. Hartwell Greene Thompson Sr., an obstetrician at Hartford Hospital, and Sigrid Marie (Johnson). He had an older brother, Hartwell Greene Thompson Jr. Selden was educated at the Loomis School, and graduated from there in 1947. He attended Yale University, where he joined the Elizabethan Club and the literary magazine, and graduated with a B.A. in 1951. He also attended Columbia University for three summers. After Yale, he studied for a year in Rome on a Fulbright Scholarship from 1951 and 1952

Selden is best known as the author of several books about the character Chester Cricket and his friends, Tucker Mouse and Harry Cat. The first book, The Cricket in Times Square, was a Newbery Honor Book in 1961. Selden explained the inspiration for that book as follows:

One night I was coming home on the subway, and I did hear a cricket chirp in the Times Square subway station. The story formed in my mind within minutes. An author is very thankful for minutes like those, although they happen all too infrequently.

In 1974, under the pseudonym of Terry Andrews, Selden wrote the adult novel The Story of Harold, the story of a bisexual children's book author's various affairs, friendships, and mentoring of a lonely child, using the fairy tale of Rumplestilskin as an allegory. The book is very descriptive of the 1970s, including the sexual revolution. Moderately graphic scenes of sadomasochism, orgies and other sexual acts are narrated by Terry, the book's protagonist. It could be construed as somewhat autobiographical in the sense the author writes of a character who writes children's books. The relationship to the boy and also the author's own feelings regarding his own existence are the main keys in this novel.

Selden remained unmarried; a resident of Greenwich Village in New York City, he died there at age 60 from a gastrointestinal hemorrhage.

== Selected books ==
=== Chester, Tucker, and Harry ===
Selden wrote six sequels to his most famous book, all published by Farrar, Straus & Giroux and illustrated by Garth Williams.

- The Cricket in Times Square (1960)
- Tucker's Countryside (1969)
- Harry Cat's Pet Puppy (1974)
- Chester Cricket's Pigeon Ride (1981)
- Chester Cricket's New Home (1983)
- Harry Kitten and Tucker Mouse (1986), – prequel to The Cricket
- The Old Meadow (1987)

=== Other fiction ===
- The Dog That Could Swim Underwater: Memoirs of a Springer Spaniel (Viking Press, 1956)
- The Garden Under the Sea (Viking, 1957)
- I See What I See! (Ariel Books, 1962)
- The Mice, the Monks, and the Christmas Tree (Macmillan, 1963)
- Sparrow Socks (Harper & Row, 1965)
- Oscar Lobster's Fair Exchange (Harper & Row, 1966) – modification of The Garden Under the Sea
- The Dunkard (Harper & Row, 1968)
- The Genie of Sutton Place (1972)
- Irma and Jerry (Avon Camelot, 1982)

=== Nonfiction ===
- Heinrich Schliemann: Discoverer of Buried Treasure (Macmillan, 1964) – Science Story Library series #3
- Sir Arthur Evans: Discoverer of Knossos (Macmillan, 1964) – Science Story #4

The 19th century archaeologists Schliemann and Evans led excavations of ancient Aegean civilization.
