= Wurts =

Wurts is a surname. Notable people with it include:

- Albert Wurts Whitney (1870–1943), American statistician and actuarial scientist
- Bruna Wurts, Brazilian artistic roller skater
- Charles Stewart Wurts (1790-1859), American businessman
- George Washington Wurts (1843–1928), American diplomat and art collector
- Janny Wurts (born 1953), American fantasy novelist and illustrator
- John Wurts (1792–1861), American politician
