= Lee Rouson =

American football player (born 1962)

No. 22, 44
- Position: Running back

Personal information
- Born: October 18, 1962 (age 64); Elizabeth City, North Carolina, U.S.
- Listed height: 6 ft 1 in (1.85 m)
- Listed weight: 220 lb (100 kg)

Career information
- High school: Walter H. Page (Greensboro, North Carolina)
- College: Colorado (1981–1984)
- NFL draft: 1985: 8th round, 213th overall pick

Career history
- New York Giants (1985–1990); Cleveland Browns (1991)

Awards and highlights
- 2× Super Bowl champion (XXI, XXV); Second-team All-Big Eight (1984)

Career NFL statistics
- Rushing yards: 2,673
- Rushing average: 8.9
- Total touchdowns: 18
- Stats at Pro Football Reference

Cecil Lee Rouson (born October 18, 1962) is an American former professional football player who was a running back in the National Football League (NFL). He played a total of seven seasons for the New York Giants and Cleveland Browns. Rouson played college football for the Colorado Buffaloes and was selected by the Giants in the eighth round of the 1985 NFL draft. He was selected as the NFL Special Teams Player of the Year in 1986.

== Early life ==
Rouson was born in Elizabeth City, North Carolina. His family later moved to Greensboro, North Carolina where he attended Page High School and was an older football teammate of former NFL wide receiver Haywood Jeffires. After high school, Rouson attended the University of Colorado Boulder. While playing for the Buffaloes, he earned Freshman All Big Eight team honors in 1981, was an honorable mention All Big Eight Player of the Year, and participated in the Blue–Gray Football Classic. Rouson is 4th on the list of Buffaloes all-time leading rushers.

== Professional career ==
Lee Rouson was selected in the eighth round of the 1985 NFL draft by the New York Giants, the #213th player taken overall. Rouson saw little playing time his first year, appearing in only two games rushing for one yard on one attempt. The next season, he would see considerably more playing time, appearing in 14 games. Serving on special teams and backing up Giants running back Joe Morris, Rouson had 54 carries for 179 yards and two touchdowns, plus eight receptions for 121 yards and a third touchdown. He played a notable role in the Giants 39–20 win over the Denver Broncos in Super Bowl XXI, primarily returning kicks but also rushing for 22 yards on three carries plus a 23-yard reception from quarterback Phil Simms in the third quarter. Rouson continued as a solid player for the Giants through the 1990 season, capping it with a second Super Bowl ring as New York edged the Buffalo Bills 20–19 in Super Bowl XXV. Lee Rouson's final season in the NFL was spent as a tight end and fullback for the Cleveland Browns before suffering a career-ending ankle injury.

Rouson credits former football coaches Bill Parcells, Bill Belichick and Bill McCartney for his success.

== Life after football ==
Lee Rouson works as a motivational speaker for Sports World Ministries, travelling to schools and churches around the United States. Rouson is also an associate pastor at New Horizon Community Church and has served as northern New Jersey director for the Fellowship of Christian Athletes. He lives in Flanders section of Mount Olive Township, New Jersey. Rouson and wife Lisa, a Registered Nurse and Director of Oncology, are the parents of four children; two boys, two girls. In the early 2000's Rouson started coaching Football at Mount Olive High School, Mount Olive Township School District.

He was a mentor at Mount Olive High School and Chester M. Stephens Elementary School. Rouson's son, Jas Lee Rouson was a running back for Towson University.
