= Vialva =

Vialva is a surname. Notable people with the surname include:

- Christopher Vialva (1980–2020), American convicted murderer
- Marcus Vialva (born 1974), birth name of Shabaam Sahdeeq, American alternative hip hop artist
- Naya Vialva, American soccer player
