= Turkey Brook Park =

Park in New Jersey, United States

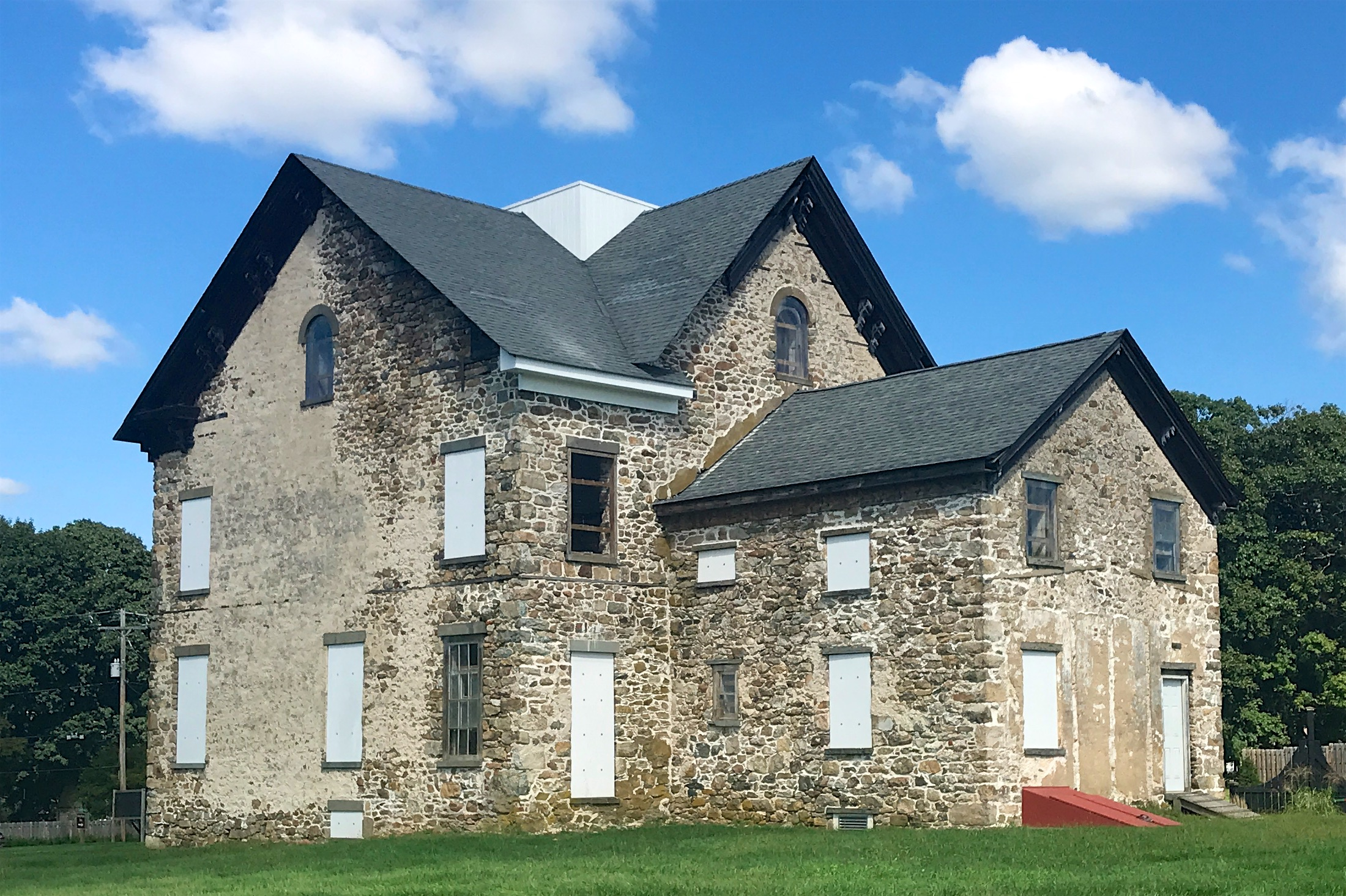
- Seward Mansion in Turkey Brook Park
- Interactive map of Turkey Brook Park
- Coordinates: 40.8643°N 74.7244°W
- Area: 267 acres (1.08 km^{2})
- Created: July 19, 2003

Turkey Brook Park is located within Mount Olive Township, in Morris County, New Jersey on Flanders Road next to the Chester M. Stephens Elementary School.

Mount Olive Township's Grand Opening of the park was held on July 19, 2003.

== Geography ==
Turkey Brook Park is 267 acres (1.08 km^{2}) designed for passive recreation, local sports, walking, hiking and fishing. The Park is equipped with 1 full size turf and lighted Soccer field + 3 full size grass Soccer Fields, 2 Baseball Fields, 2 Softball Field, and 1 Football Field.

The Mount Olive Dog Park is located in Turkey Brook Park. It is approximately 2 acres (8,100 m^{2}) with dedicated areas for small, large, and disabled dogs. The grand opening leash cutting ceremony was held October 21, 2007

== History ==
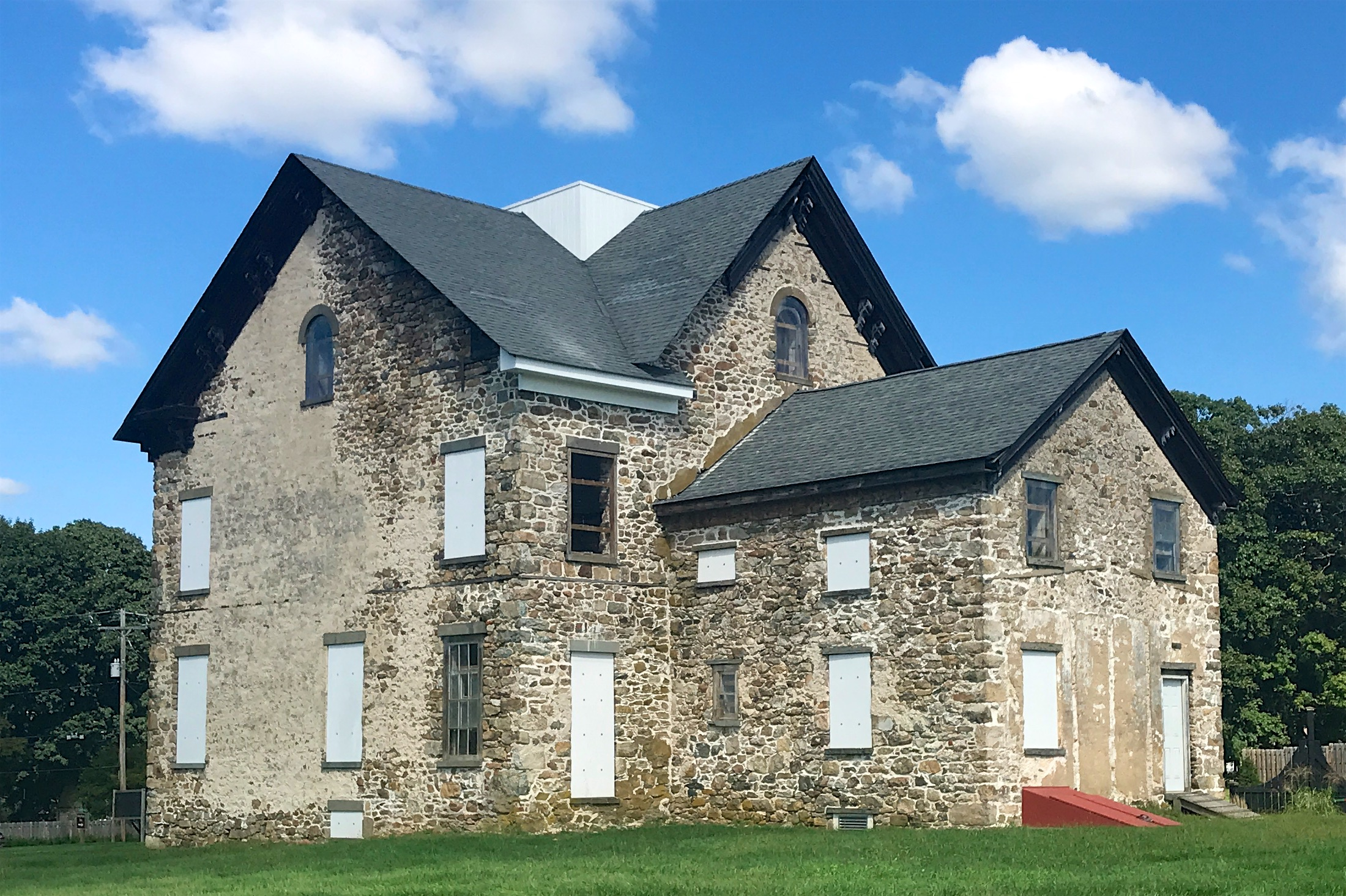
Seward Mansion in Turkey Brook Park

The Seward Mansion is located at the entrance to Turkey Brook Park. The mansion was built in 1858 by Beulah and Henry Seward. The mansion had 9 large rooms, a grand staircase at its center, chandeliers, ornate mantels and a wrap-around porch. Architecturally, it is an example of 18th century stone construction in a mid-Victorian style.

The building is currently undergoing renovation efforts by the Mount Olive Historical Society.
