= Liam Anderson (American football) =

American football player (born 2000)

No. 50 – Miami Dolphins
- Position: Linebacker
- Roster status: Practice squad

Personal information
- Born: April 30, 2000 (age 26); Flanders, New Jersey, U.S.
- Listed height: 6 ft 3 in (1.91 m)
- Listed weight: 230 lb (104 kg)

Career information
- High school: Mount Olive (Mount Olive Township, New Jersey)
- College: Holy Cross (2018–2022)
- NFL draft: 2023: undrafted

Career history
- Indianapolis Colts (2023–2024); Cincinnati Bengals (2025)*; Miami Dolphins (2026–present)
- * Offseason or practice squad member only

Career NFL statistics as of Week 2, 2026
- Games played: 5
- Tackles: 1
- Stats at Pro Football Reference

Liam Anderson (born April 30, 2000) is an American professional football linebacker for the Miami Dolphins of the National Football League (NFL). He played college football for the Holy Cross Crusaders. He was signed by the Indianapolis Colts of the National Football League (NFL) as an undrafted free agent in 2023.

== Early life ==
Raised in the Flanders section of Mount Olive Township, New Jersey, Anderson attended Mount Olive High School where he threw for 3,220 yards and rushed for another 1,686 yards totaling 52 total touchdowns. Anderson committed to play college football for the Holy Cross Crusaders.

== College career ==
In Anderson's five years at Holy Cross, he notched 232 tackles, 14.5 sacks, and six interceptions.

== Professional career ==
Pre-draft measurables
Height	Weight	Arm length	Hand span	Wingspan	40-yard dash	20-yard shuttle	Three-cone drill	Vertical jump	Broad jump	Bench press
6 ft 2 7/8 in (1.90 m)	226 lb (103 kg)	29 1/4 in (0.74 m)	9 1/4 in (0.23 m)	5 ft 10 1/2 in (1.79 m)	4.55 s	4.35 s	7.12 s	33.5 in (0.85 m)	10 ft 8 in (3.25 m)	20 reps
All values from Pro Day

=== Indianapolis Colts ===
After not being selected in the 2023 NFL draft, Anderson signed with the Indianapolis Colts of the National Football League (NFL) as an undrafted free agent. Anderson was released during final roster cuts, but he signed to the team's practice squad one day later. On December 30, 2023, ahead of the Colts week 17 matchup, Anderson was elevated to the active roster. One day later, Anderson made his NFL debut in week seventeen versus the Las Vegas Raiders, where he played eight total snaps.

On January 8, 2024, Anderson signed a reserve/future contract with the Colts. He was waived on August 27, and re-signed to the practice squad. He was promoted to the active roster on November 16. He was waived on November 30 and re-signed to the practice squad four days later. He signed a reserve/future contract with Indianapolis on January 6, 2025. Anderson was waived/injured on August 8. After reverting to injured reserve, he was waived by the Colts with an injury settlement on August 14.

=== Cincinnati Bengals ===
On October 30, 2025, Anderson signed with the Cincinnati Bengals' practice squad. He signed a reserve/future contract with Cincinnati on January 5, 2026.

On August 30, 2026, Anderson was waived by the Bengals as a part of final roster cuts.

=== Miami Dolphins ===
On September 1, 2026, Anderson signed with the Miami Dolphins' practice squad. On September 19, he was signed to the active roster and waived two days later. On September 23, the Dolphins re–signed Anderson to their practice squad.
