= Mount Olive Township School District =

School district in Morris County, New Jersey, US

Address
- 227 Route 206 Flanders, Morris County, New Jersey, 07836; United States
- Coordinates: 40.885551°N 74.726959°W

District information
- Grades: PreK-12
- Superintendent: Sumit Bangia
- Business administrator: Timothy Stys (acting)
- Schools: 6

Students and staff
- Enrollment: 4,786 (as of 2024–25)
- Faculty: 448.2 FTEs
- Student–teacher ratio: 10.7:1

Other information
- District Factor Group: GH
- Website: www.motsd.org
Ind.	Per pupil	District spending	Rank (*)	K-12 average	%± vs. average
1A	Total Spending	$19,103	63	$18,891	1.1%
1	Budgetary Cost	15,133	62	14,783	2.4%
2	Classroom Instruction	8,490	42	8,763	−3.1%
6	Support Services	2,574	74	2,392	7.6%
8	Administrative Cost	1,625	78	1,485	9.4%
10	Operations & Maintenance	1,949	80	1,783	9.3%
13	Extracurricular Activities	285	67	268	6.3%
16	Median Teacher Salary	67,954	72	64,043
Data from NJDoE 2014 Taxpayers' Guide to Education Spending. *Of K-12 districts with more than 3,500 students. Lowest spending=1; Highest=103

The Mount Olive Township School District is a comprehensive community public school district that serves students in pre-kindergarten through twelfth grade from Mount Olive Township, in Morris County, in the U.S. state of New Jersey.

As of the 2024–25 school year, the district, comprised of six schools, had an enrollment of 4,786 students and 448.2 classroom teachers (on an FTE basis), for a student–teacher ratio of 10.7:1. The district is classified by the New Jersey Department of Education as being in District Factor Group "GH", the third-highest of eight groupings.

== History ==
The district had been classified by the New Jersey Department of Education as being in District Factor Group "GH", the third-highest of eight groupings. District Factor Groups organize districts statewide to allow comparison by common socioeconomic characteristics of the local districts. From lowest socioeconomic status to highest, the categories are A, B, CD, DE, FG, GH, I and J.

In 2010, the district eliminated D as a passing grade for its middle- and high-schoolers. The district also instituted a rule requiring anyone who earned a grade of D or F to retake that course.

== Schools ==
Schools in the district (with 2024–25 enrollment data from the National Center for Education Statistics) are:

Elementary schools

- Mountain View Elementary School with 565 students in grades PreK-5
  - Melissa Kolenski, principal
- Sandshore Elementary School with 409 students in grades K-5
  - Jennifer Curry, principal
- Chester M. Stephens Elementary School with 696 students in grades K-5
  - Nicole Musarra, principal
- Tinc Road Elementary School with 449 students in grades K-5
  - Mark Grilo, principal

Middle school

- Mount Olive Middle School with 1,098 students in grades 6-8
  - Agatha Wilke, principal

High school

- Mount Olive High School with 1,468 students in grades 9-12
  - Carie Murphy, principal

== Administration ==
Core members of the district's administration are:

- Sumit Bangia, superintendent
- Timothy Stys, acting business administrator / board secretary

Robert Zywicki, who had served as superintendent since 2018, resigned in April 2023, citing claims that he had been "constructively discharged" from his position when he had been placed on paid leave in October 2022 due to the "grudges" of board members. In January 2025, the two parties reached a settlement under which Zywicki would withdraw his complaints and would be paid $645,000, of which just over $150,000 came from the district and the remainder from its insurer.

== Board of education ==
The district's board of education, comprised of nine members, sets policy and oversees the fiscal and educational operation of the district through its administration. As a Type II school district, the board's trustees are elected directly by voters to serve three-year terms of office on a staggered basis, with three seats up for election each year held (since 2012) as part of the November general election. The board appoints a superintendent to oversee the district's day-to-day operations and a business administrator to supervise the business functions of the district.
