= Mount Olive Village Historic District =

Historic district in New Jersey, United States

- U.S. National Register of Historic Places
- U.S. Historic district
- New Jersey Register of Historic Places
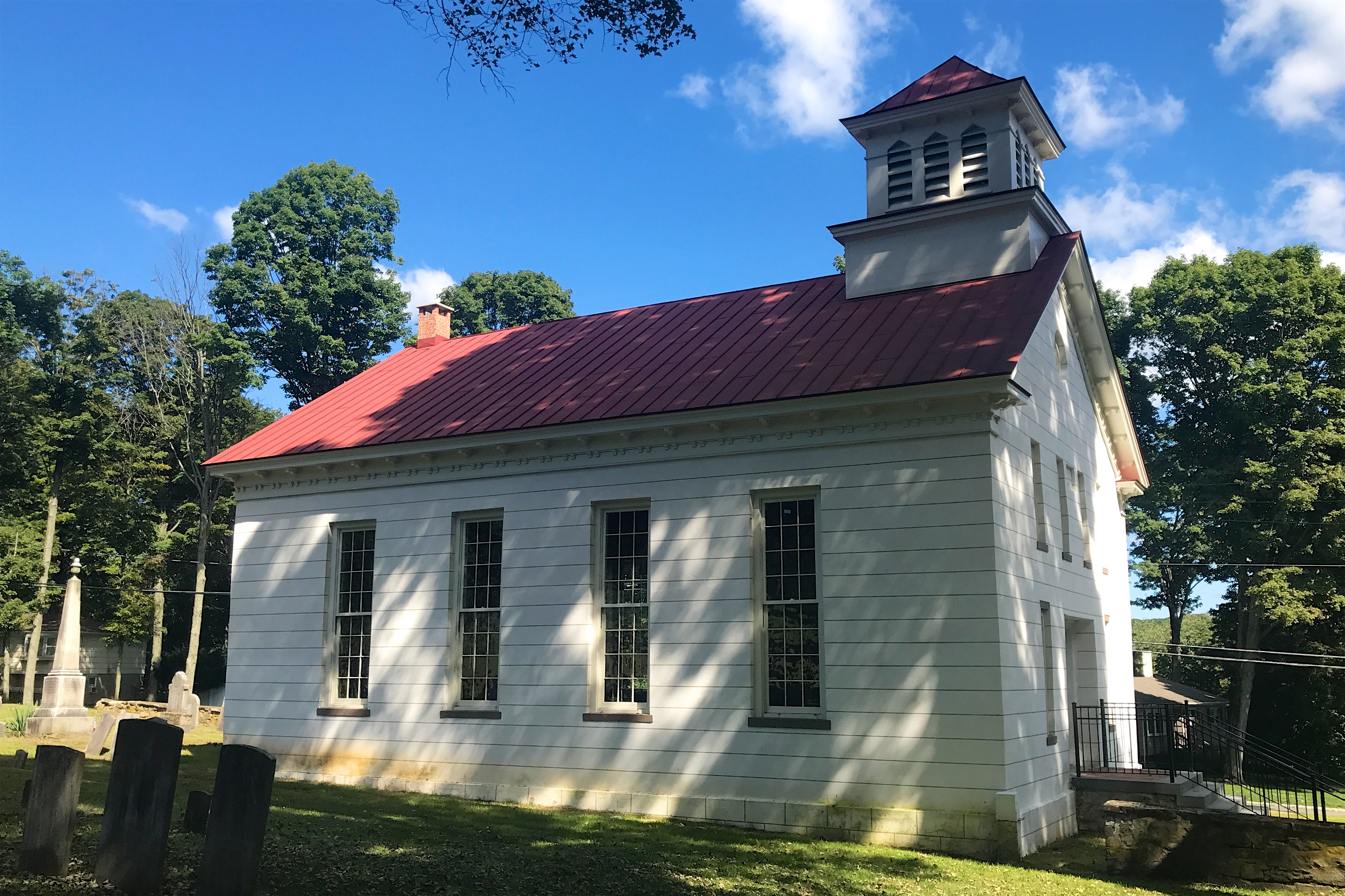
- Mount Olive Baptist Church

- Location within Morris County, New Jersey Location within New Jersey Location within the United States
- Location: Mount Olive Road and Flanders-Drakestown Road; Mount Olive Township, New Jersey
- Coordinates: 40°47′05″N 74°46′48″W
- Area: 7 acres (2.8 ha)
- Architectural style: Greek Revival
- NRHP reference No.: 15000490
- NJRHP No.: 5446

Significant dates
- Added to NRHP: August 3, 2015
- Designated NJRHP: June 11, 2015

The Mount Olive Village Historic District is a 7-acre (2.8 ha) historic district located along Mount Olive Road and Flanders-Drakestown Road in the Mount Olive Village section of Mount Olive Township in Morris County, New Jersey, United States. The district was added to the National Register of Historic Places on August 3, 2015, for its significance in architecture and exploration/settlement. The district has two contributing buildings, the Mount Olive Baptist Church and the Mount Olive Academy, and three contributing sites.

== History and description ==
The Mount Olive Baptist Church was built in 1855 with Greek Revival and Italianate styles. The date stone has "Mount Olive Baptist Meeting House 1855" inscribed on it. The Mount Olive Academy was built in 1837. It served as a school in the township until 1925. The Baptist Churchyard Cemetery, the Greenwood Cemetery, and the Mount Olive Union Cemetery contribute to the district.

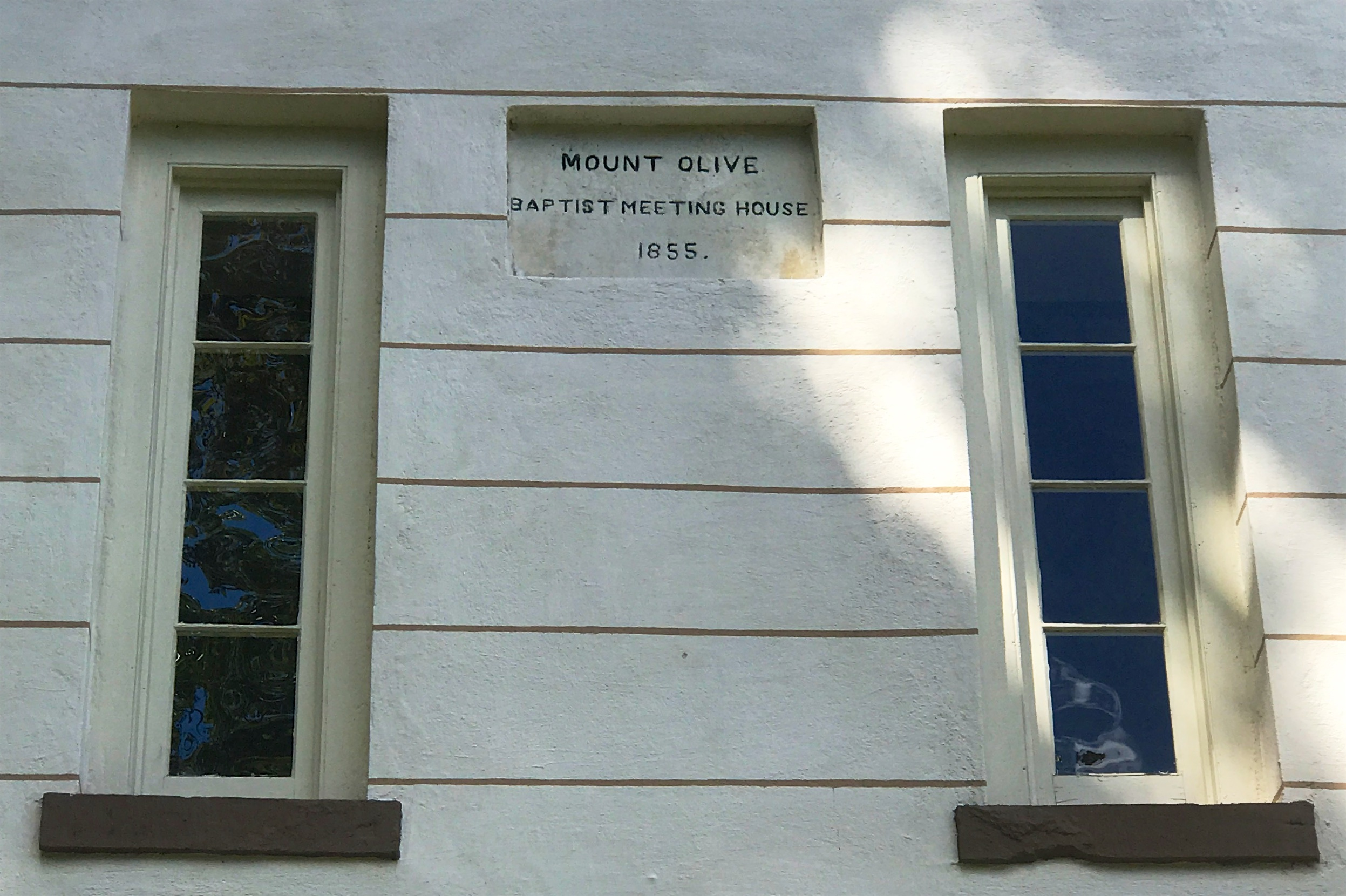
Date stone on Mount Olive Baptist Church

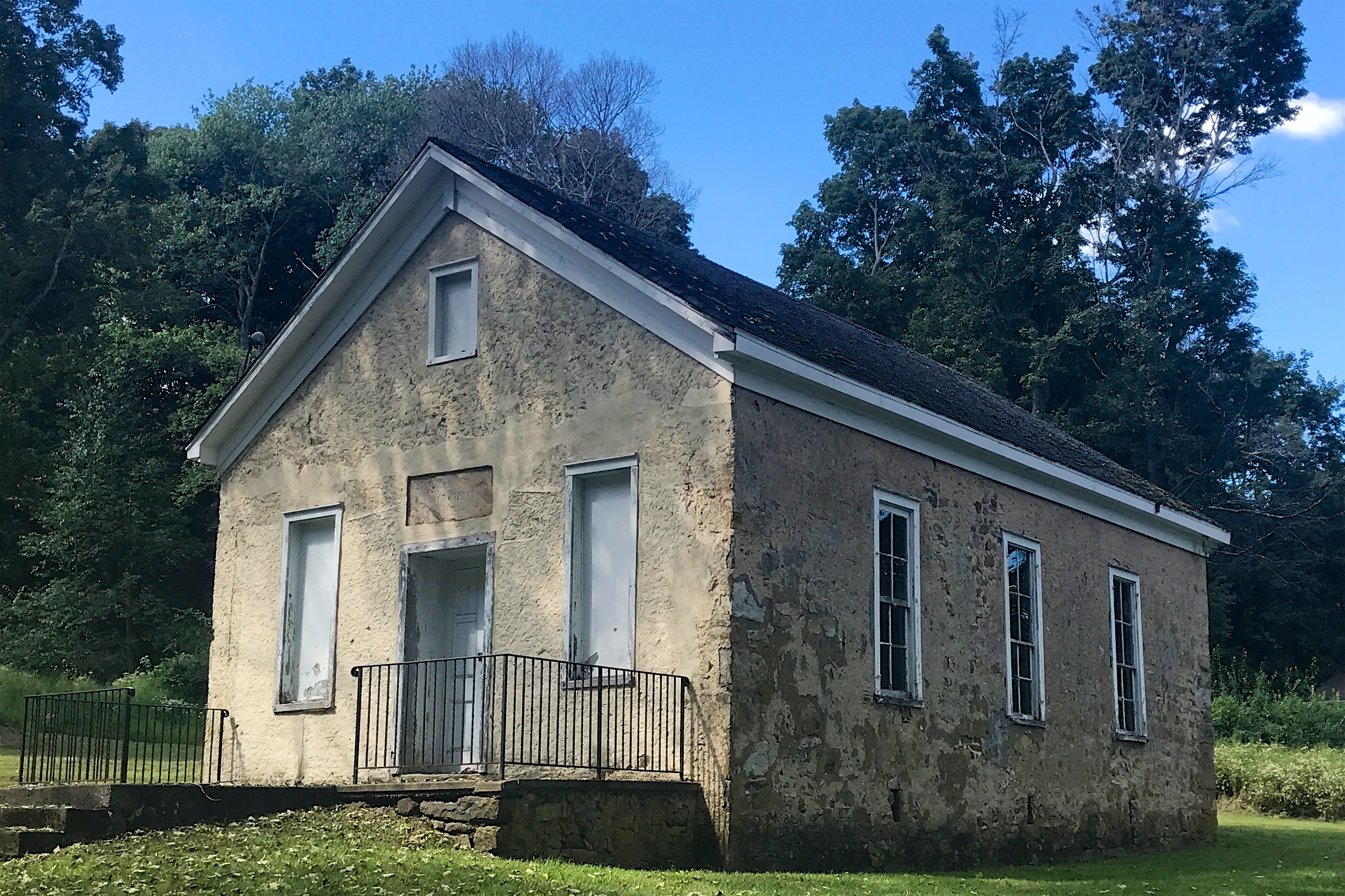
Mount Olive Academy, built 1837

== See also ==
- National Register of Historic Places listings in Morris County, New Jersey
