= Seward Mansion =

- Seward House
- U.S. National Register of Historic Places
- New Jersey Register of Historic Places
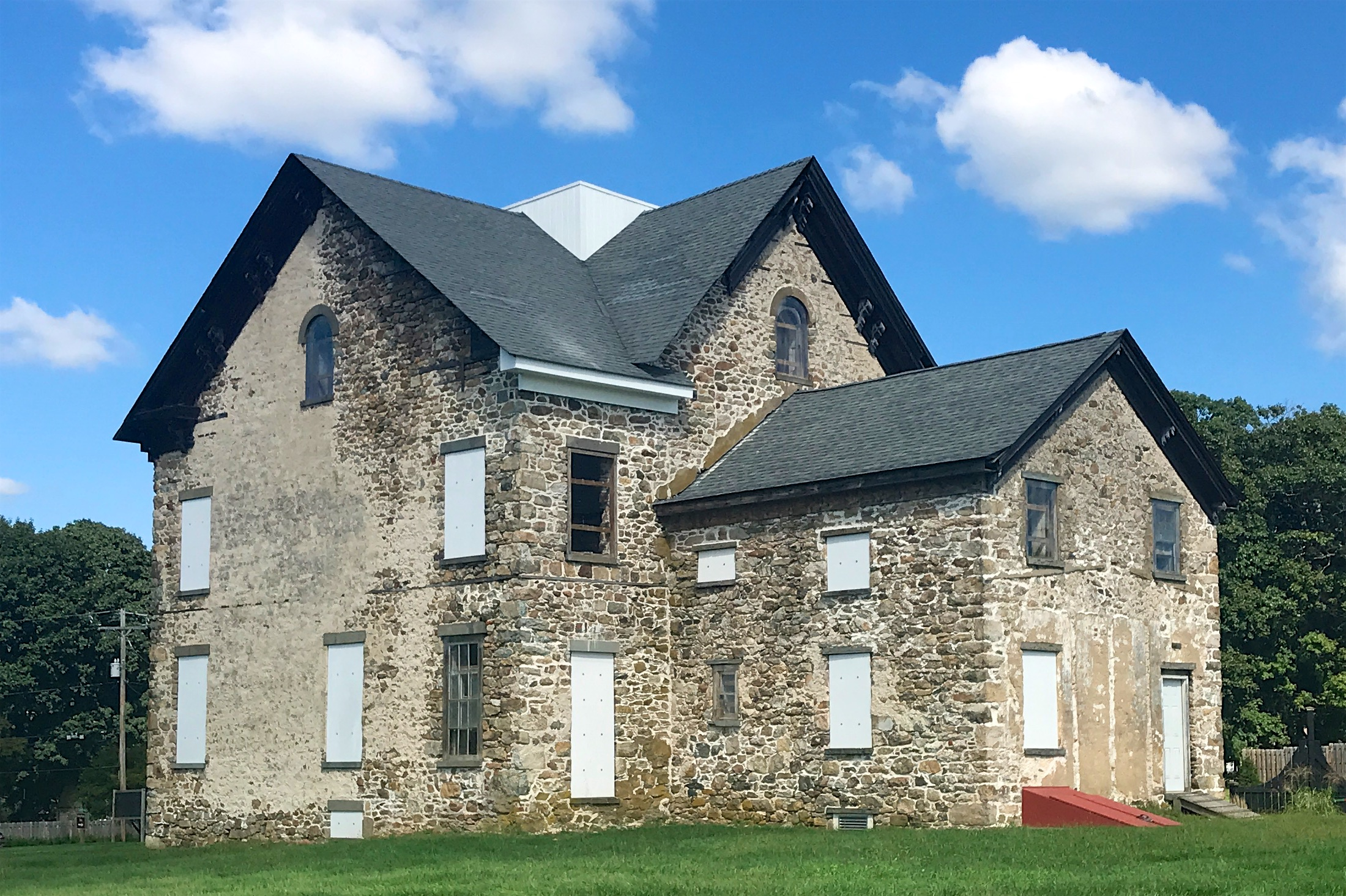
- Seward Mansion, 2018

- Location within Morris County, New Jersey Location within New Jersey Location within the United States
- Location: 30 Flanders Road (Turkey Brook Park); Mount Olive Township, New Jersey
- Coordinates: 40°52′00″N 74°43′33″W
- Built: c. 1865
- Architectural style: Italianate
- NRHP reference No.: 13000977
- NJRHP No.: 4410

Significant dates
- Added to NRHP: December 24, 2013
- Designated NJRHP: September 23, 2013

The Seward Mansion is a historic house at 30 Flanders Road, in Turkey Brook Park, Mount Olive Township, Morris County, New Jersey. The mansion, described using its historic name, Seward House, was added to the National Register of Historic Places on December 24, 2013, for its significance in architecture.

== History and description ==
The Italianate stone farmhouse, built around 1865, was the home of Henry Clay Seward (born 1829), son of Henry Seward (born 1795), a cousin of William Henry Seward (1801–1872). The listing also includes a stone barn.

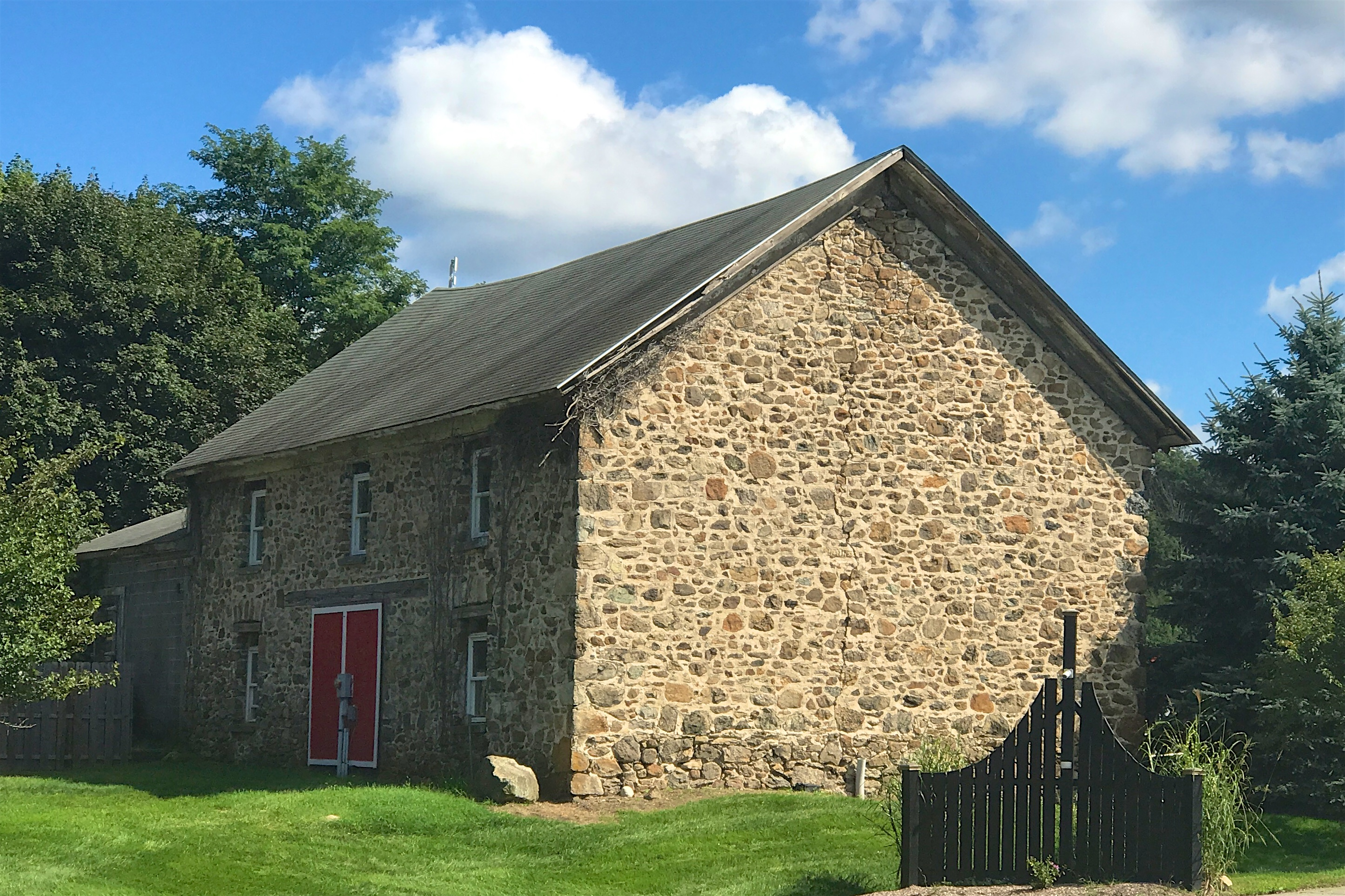
Stone barn, contributing property

== See also ==
- National Register of Historic Places listings in Morris County, New Jersey
