= Mount Olive High School (New Jersey) =

High school in Morris County, New Jersey, US

Location
- 18 Cory Road; Mount Olive Township, Morris County, New Jersey 07836; United States; 40.857621°N 74.710533°W

Information
- Type: Public high school
- Motto: "First we will be best, then we will be first!"
- Established: 1972 (as West Morris Mount Olive HS); September, 1978 (as Mount Olive HS)
- School district: Mount Olive Township School District
- NCES School ID: 341098004398
- Principal: Carie Murphy
- Faculty: 117.3 FTEs
- Grades: 9-12
- Enrollment: 1,511 (as of 2023–24)
- Student to teacher ratio: 12.9:1
- Colors: Red; Black; Vegas Gold
- Athletics conference: Northwest Jersey Athletic Conference (general); North Jersey Super Football Conference (football)
- Team name: Marauders
- Website: mohs.motsd.org

Mount Olive High School is a four-year comprehensive public high school that serves students in ninth through twelfth grade from Mount Olive Township, in Morris County, in the U.S. state of New Jersey, operating as the lone secondary school of the Mount Olive Township School District. The school is located in the Flanders section of the township.

As of the 2023–24 school year, the school had an enrollment of 1,511 students and 117.3 classroom teachers (on an FTE basis), for a student–teacher ratio of 12.9:1. There were 188 students (12.4% of enrollment) eligible for free lunch and 74 (4.9% of students) eligible for reduced-cost lunch.

== History ==
Before joining the West Morris Regional High School District, which opened for the 1958–59 school year, students from Mount Olive had been sent to attend Hackettstown High School, Netcong High School or Roxbury High School, all of which were becoming overcrowded in the 1950s and would no longer be able to accommodate students from Mount Olive.

The original school opened in October 1972 and was operated as West Morris Mount Olive High School by the West Morris Regional district, until voters from Mount Olive Township and the other constituent municipalities approved a referendum to have Mount Olive leave the regional district effective with the start of the 1978–79 school year. West Morris Mount Olive High School Class of 1978 was the last graduating class from this facility under the regional administration. The high school building and remaining faculty became part of the Mount Olive Township Schools.

== Awards, recognition and rankings ==
In its listing of "America's Best High Schools 2016", the school was ranked 482nd out of 500 best high schools in the country; it was ranked 50th among all high schools in New Jersey and 33rd among the state's non-magnet schools.

The school was the 97th-ranked public high school in New Jersey out of 339 schools statewide in New Jersey Monthly magazine's September 2014 cover story on the state's "Top Public High Schools", using a new ranking methodology. The school had been ranked 69th in the state of 328 schools in 2012, after being ranked 90th in 2010 out of 322 schools listed. The magazine ranked the school 107th in 2008 out of 316 schools. The school was ranked 114th in the magazine's September 2006 issue, which surveyed 316 schools across the state. Schooldigger.com ranked the school tied for 109th out of 381 public high schools statewide its 2011 rankings (an increase of 35 positions from the 2010 ranking) which were based on the combined percentage of students classified as proficient or above proficient on the mathematics (85.9%) and language arts literacy (96.4%) components of the High School Proficiency Assessment (HSPA).

== Athletics ==
The Mount Olive High School Marauders compete in the Northwest Jersey Athletic Conference, which is comprised of public and private high schools located in Morris, Sussex and Warren counties, operating under the supervision of the New Jersey State Interscholastic Athletic Association (NJSIAA). Prior to the NJSIAA's 2010 realignment, the school had competed as part of the Iron Hills Conference, which included high schools in Essex, Morris and Union counties. With 1,158 students in grades 10-12, the school was classified by the NJSIAA for the 2019–20 school year as Group IV for most athletic competition purposes, which included schools with an enrollment of 1,060 to 5,049 students in that grade range. The football team competes in the Freedom Blue division of the North Jersey Super Football Conference, which includes 112 schools competing in 20 divisions, making it the nation's biggest football-only high school sports league. The school was classified by the NJSIAA as Group IV North for football for 2024–2026, which included schools with 893 to 1,315 students.

Students are eligible to participate in interscholastic sports offered in the fall, winter, and spring seasons. Fall sports include boys/girls soccer, girls tennis, boys/girls cross country, boys football, girls cheerleading, girls volleyball, and girls field hockey. Winter sports include boys/girls basketball, boys/girls indoor track, boys wrestling, and boys/girls swimming. Spring sports include boys/girls track, boys/girls lacrosse, boys baseball, girls softball, boys/girls golf, girls flag football, and boys tennis.

The school participates as the host school / lead agency for a joint cooperative ice hockey team with Hopatcong High School, while Hopatcong is the host school for co-op boys / girls bowling teams. The ice hockey team also includes Hackettstown High School as a partner. These co-op programs operate under agreements scheduled to expire at the end of the 2023–24 school year. The ice hockey partnership with Mount Olive started in the 2014-15 school year and plays under the Mount Olive name.

The field hockey team won the North II Group II state sectional championship in 1981, won the North II Group III title in 1988, 1995 and 1998, and won the North I Group III title in 1999, 2001, 2003 and 2004. The 2003 field hockey team won the North I, Group III sectional title with a 1–0 win against High Point Regional High School. The 2004 team repeated the title with a 3–0 win over Wayne Hills High School.

The girls' cross country team won the Group III state championship in 1989 and 2013. The team has won the North Jersey sectional title 11 times in their history starting with five in a row from 1977–1981.

The boys' soccer team won the North I, Group III state sectional championship in 1999 with a 2–1 win against Northern Highlands Regional High School in the tournament final.

In 2002, the football team finished the season with an 11-1 record after winning the North II, Group III sectional championship with a 14–13 victory against Jefferson Township High School in the championship game, after holding off a late rally by Jefferson.

The boys' wrestling team won the North II Group III state sectional title in 2002 and the North I Group IV title in 2020 and 2022–2024; the team won the Group IV state championship in 2022.

In 2008, the softball team won the NJSIAA/Blue Ribbon Awards North I, Group III sectional tournament with a 1–0 shutout of Montville Township High School.

In 2011, the basketball team won their first conference championship in school history. In 2012, the Marauders won their second straight conference title, sharing it with Sparta High School and Pope John XXIII Regional High School. They also made it to the finals for their County Tournament for just the second time in school history. However, after tying the game up with 11 seconds to play, they lost by 2 points when Chatham scored a layup with 5 seconds left.

The ice hockey team won the Haas Cup in 2014 with a 3-2 overtime win against Madison High School in the championship game.

== Fine and performing arts ==
Members of the Mount Olive High School Choirs have many outside performing opportunities. Members have sung with Essential Voices USA at Symphony Space in NYC for a concert tribute to Leonard Bernstein as well the New York Pops at Carnegie Hall presenting a program featuring the music of Lerner and Loewe. The MOHS Concert Choir has sung on the PBS special Celebrate America with composer Tim Janis which aired in March 2010. In November 2011, members sang with Neil Diamond at the Rockefeller Center tree lighting ceremony on NBC Television as part of Essential Voices USA. Members have also been a part of the annual "American Christmas Carol" (also featuring Tim Janis) concert in December at Carnegie Hall where Vanzini is the Choirmaster of a 230-voice choir and made his second conducting appearance at Carnegie Hall on December 2, 2011.

== FIRST Robotics ==
The Mount Olive Varsity FIRST Robotics Competition Team is MORT Team 11. MORT was founded in the fall of 1996, and started competing in the 1997 season. The Junior Varsity team, which competes at the same level as Team 11, is MORT BETA Team 193. This team, which first competed in 2013, consists of only freshmen. Classes have been offered in the district since the year 2000.

Founder Bill McGowan was awarded the FIRST New Jersey Regional Woodie Flowers Award in 2008, the highest commendation that FIRST awards a team coach or mentor.

== Administration ==
The school's principal is Carie Murphy. Her core administration team includes four vice principals.

== Notable alumni ==
- Liam Anderson (born 2000) American football linebacker for the Indianapolis Colts of the National Football League
- Mariann Budde (born 1959), prelate of the Episcopal Church who has served as Bishop of Washington since November 2011
- Keturah Orji (born 1996, class of 2014), track and field athlete specializing in the triple jump who was selected as part of the U.S. team at the 2016 Summer Olympics
- Ryan Peterson (born 1995), professional footballer who plays for the Charlotte Independence in USL League One
- Steve Slattery (born 1980, class of 1998), track and field athlete who is a steeplechase specialist
- Naya Vialva, footballer who plays as a defender for the United States Virgin Islands women's national soccer team
