= David W. K. Peacock Jr. =

American government official (1924–2005)

David William Killin Peacock Jr. (1924-2005) was a government official and businessman. He served as a Deputy Undersecretary at the U.S. Department of Commerce during the Nixon Administration. Peacock also held positions at the U.S. State Department.

== Early life and education ==
Peacock was born in Cleveland, Ohio to David Peacock Sr. and Beryl McCaslin Peacock on July 30, 1924. He grew up in Flanders, New Jersey, a neighborhood of Mount Olive Township. In 1942, Peacock graduated from the Morristown School (now the Morristown-Beard School) in Morristown, New Jersey. His father, David Peacock, Sr., headed the Board of Trustees during his time at the school.

Following graduation, Peacock served in the U.S. Army Air Forces during World War II. He piloted twin-engine airplanes. After the war, Peacock earned his bachelor's degree in economics from Princeton University in Princeton, New Jersey. He then joined J. P. Morgan in a trainee role. Peacock later served as an assistant to security analysts.

== Government and industry career ==
In 1950, Peacock moved to Washington, DC to work as a foreign service officer in the State Department. He served as an assistant to U.S. Secretary of State John Foster Dulles. Peacock later headed the State Department's Public Correspondence Branch, and served as a vice consul at the U.S. Consulate General in Casablanca, Morocco. In 1959, the U.S. Department of Commerce named Peacock a special assistant to Secretary of Commerce Frederick H. Mueller. He served in that role until joining the office of U.S. Senator Kenneth Keating (New York) as a staff member.

After leaving the federal government, Peacock served as the assistant vice president at American Security and Trust Company. He headed the bank's branch in Georgetown. Peacock then worked as an investment officer at the International Finance Corporation, a unit of the World Bank Group, until 1968. In 1969, he rejoined the federal government to serve as a Deputy Undersecretary at the Department of Commerce. Peacock later consulted on government sales and market research for Atlantic Development Corporation. He worked at the Export-Import Bank, an independent federal agency, from 1971 to 1984. Peacock served as a vice president for exporter credits and guarantees and then coordinated the feasibility study program.

The Eisenhower Presidential Center in Abilene, Kansas houses Peacock's papers from his tenure working for Dulles. The papers appear in the Special Assistants Series in the John Foster Dulles Papers.

== Abscam Jury ==
In 1981, Peacock served on the federal jury for one of the Abscam corruption trials. He held the role of jury foreman. While reading the verdict convicting U.S. Representative Richard Kelly, he wore a yellow ribbon on his jacket lapel. The ribbon commemorated the release of American hostages during the Iran hostage crisis.

== Volunteer service ==
After retirement, Peacock moved to Cheriton, Virginia on the Eastern Shore. He tutored first grade students at Kiptopeke Elementary School in Northampton County, Virginia. In 2002, the school awarded Peacock their Volunteer of the Year Award. While living in New Jersey, Peacock served on the Executive Committee of Morris County's Board of Agriculture. He also served on the Flanders Subcommittee for the Planning Board of Mount Olive Township, New Jersey.

== Family ==
Peacock married Judith Van Orden Peacock in 1952. They had two children together, Sarah and William. After Peacock and Judith Peacock divorced, he married Mary Eyre Peacock.
