= Steve Slattery =

American steeplechase runner

Personal information
- Nationality: American
- Born: August 14, 1980 (age 46) Flanders, New Jersey

Sport
- Sport: Track
- Events: 1500 meters, 3000 meters, 5000 meters, 3000 meters steeplechase
- College team: Colorado

Achievements and titles
- Personal bests: Mile: 3:56.75; 3000m: 7:50.76; 2-mile: 8:37.95; 5000m: 13:36.03

Steve Slattery (born August 14, 1980) is an American track and field athlete who is a steeplechase specialist. He has a personal record 8:15.69 minutes for the event and was the 2003 American outdoor champion. He has represented the United States at the World Championships in Athletics on two occasions (2003, 2005) and has also competed at the 2006 IAAF World Indoor Championships and the 2006 IAAF World Cup.

== Running career ==
=== High school ===
Raised in the Flanders section of Mount Olive Township, New Jersey, he attended Mount Olive High School and established himself as a distance runner while there, receiving four high school All-America honors before graduating in 1998. He made his international debut that year at the 1998 IAAF World Cross Country Championships, finishing 40th in the junior race.

=== Collegiate ===
He went on to attend the University of Colorado from 1998 to 2002. During that time he was the 2001 Big 12 Conference champion in the steeplechase and came tenth at the 2001 World Student Games. He was the runner-up at the NCAA Men's Outdoor Track and Field Championship as well as the USA Outdoor Track and Field Championships in 2002. While at the University of Colorado he met his future wife, Sara Gorton, another distance runner.

=== Professional ===
After college he signed a contract with Nike and won his first national title at the 2003 USA Outdoor Championships. Slattery made his senior international debut at the 2003 World Championships in Athletics and ran a personal record time of 8:22.32 minutes in the heats. He failed to build on this success the following year and missed a spot on the Olympic team after finishing fifth at the United States Olympic Trials. In 2005 he set a personal record time of 8:17.87 minutes at the FBK Games, the fastest by an American that year. A third-place finish at the USA Outdoors brought him his second world championship appearance, although he was again eliminated in the heats at the 2005 World Championships. In 2006 he represented the United States in the 3000 meters flat at the 2006 IAAF World Indoor Championships – Men's 3000 metres and in the steeplechase at the 2006 IAAF World Cup. He was the runner-up at the usatf national championships that year and his season's best time of 8:22.70 minutes was second in the American rankings.

Slattery set a new best of 8:15.69 minutes at the 2007 Memorial Van Damme meeting (second fastest American that year) and was third in the steeplechase at the Prefontaine Classic. Despite this form, he failed to finish at the USA Outdoor Championships. As one of the fastest performers on the circuit, he was invited to the 2007 IAAF World Athletics Final in Stuttgart, where he finished eighth. He came second at the 2008 Reebok Grand Prix in New York City with a run of 8:28.21 minutes, but failed to finish at the Olympic Trials final. After a low-key 2009, he returned to form on the 2010 IAAF Diamond League circuit and came third at the 2010 USA Outdoor Nationals. In 2011 he ran a season's best of 8:28.52 minutes at the Shanghai Golden Grand Prix, but pulled out of the steeplechase heats at the national championships.
