= Joel B. Sutherland =

American politician (1792–1861)

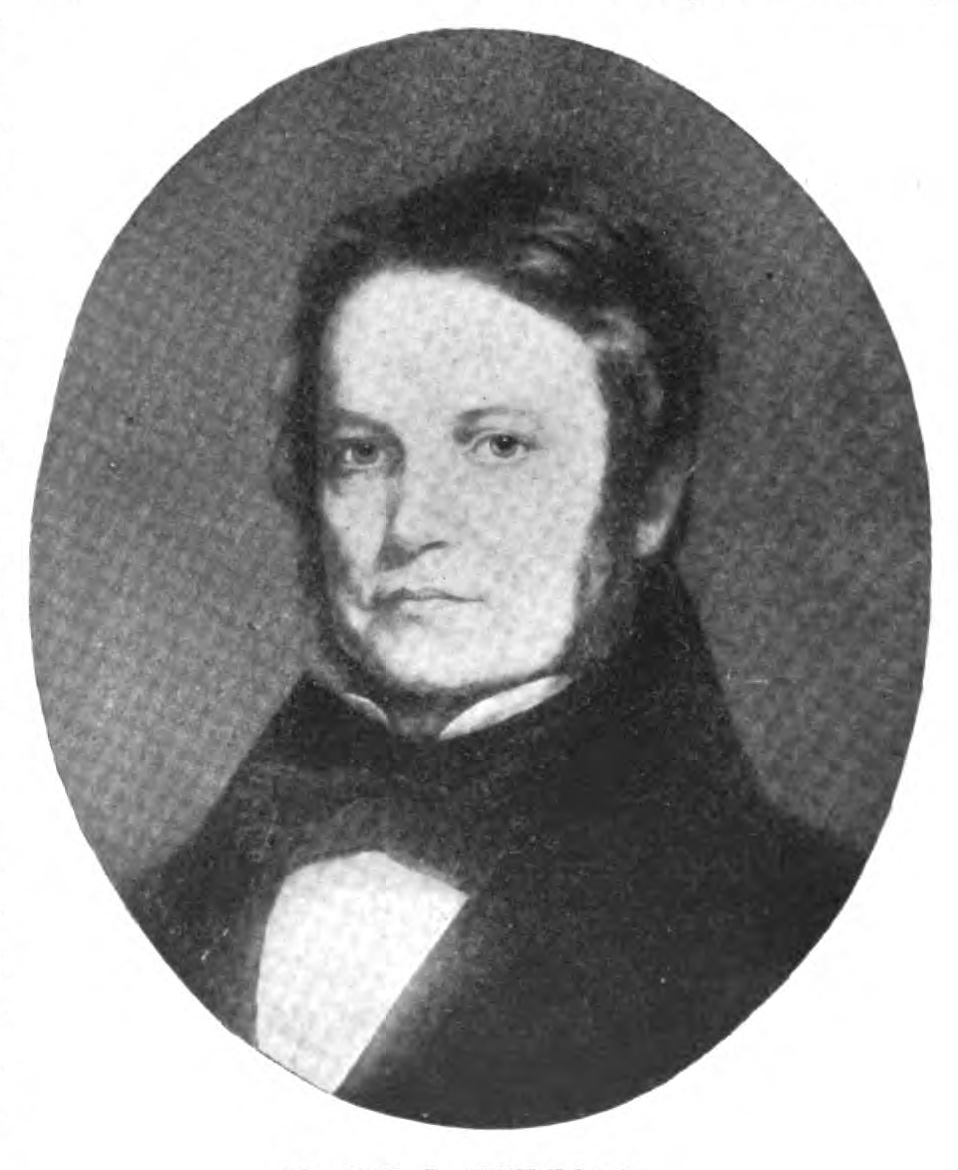

Member of the U.S. House of Representatives from Pennsylvania's 1st district
- In office October 8, 1833 – March 3, 1837
- Preceded by: Vacant
- Succeeded by: Lemuel Paynter
- In office March 4, 1827 – March 3, 1833
- Preceded by: John Wurts
- Succeeded by: Vacant

Personal details
- Born: Joel Barlow Sutherland; February 26, 1792 Gloucester County, New Jersey, U.S.
- Died: November 15, 1861 (aged 69) Philadelphia, Pennsylvania, U.S.
- Resting place: Old Pine Street Church, Philadelphia, Pennsylvania; 39°56′36.0″N 75°08′57.7″W
- Party: Whig
- Other political affiliations: Democratic (before 1836)
- Spouse: Mary Reade (m. 1812)
- Children: 8, including Thomas W. Sutherland
- Education: University of Pennsylvania

Military service
- Allegiance: United States
- Branch: Pennsylvania Militia
- Years of service: 1812–1814
- Rank: Lieutenant Colonel
- Commands: 1st Regiment of Riflemen
- Wars: War of 1812

Joel Barlow Sutherland (February 26, 1792 – November 15, 1861) was an American politician who served as the first president of the General Society of the War of 1812 from 1854 to 1861. He was a member of the Democratic Party who represented Pennsylvania in the United States House of Representatives (1827–1837).

== Early life and career ==
Joel Barlow Sutherland was born in Gloucester County, New Jersey. He graduated from the University of Pennsylvania at Philadelphia in 1812. He served in the War of 1812 as assistant surgeon to the "Junior Artillerists of Philadelphia," transferred to the line, and was appointed in 1814 lieutenant colonel of rifles in the State militia. He was a member of the Pennsylvania House of Representatives from 1813 to 1816. He was a founder of Jefferson Medical College at Philadelphia. He served in the Pennsylvania State Senate for the 2nd district from 1816 and 1817. He later abandoned medicine for the practice of law.

Sutherland was elected as a Jacksonian to the Twentieth and to the four succeeding Congresses. He served as chairman of the United States House Committee on Commerce during the Twenty-third and Twenty-fourth Congresses. He was an unsuccessful Whig candidate for reelection in 1836 to the Twenty-fifth Congress and for election in 1838 to the Twenty-sixth Congress. He served as associate judge of the court of common pleas of Philadelphia in 1833 and 1834.

He was one of the originators of the Lafayette Cemetery in South Philadelphia.

== Death ==
Sutherland died on November 15, 1861, at the age of 69. His grave is in the churchyard of Old Pine Street Church, in Philadelphia, Pennsylvania.

== See also ==
- List of speakers of the Pennsylvania House of Representatives

U.S. House of Representatives
Preceded by John Wurts	Member of the U.S. House of Representatives from Pennsylvania's 1st congressional district March 4, 1827 – March 3, 1841 (Vacant February 1833 – October 8, 1833)	Succeeded by Lemuel Paynter
