= Noah Brown (American football) =

American football player (born 1996)

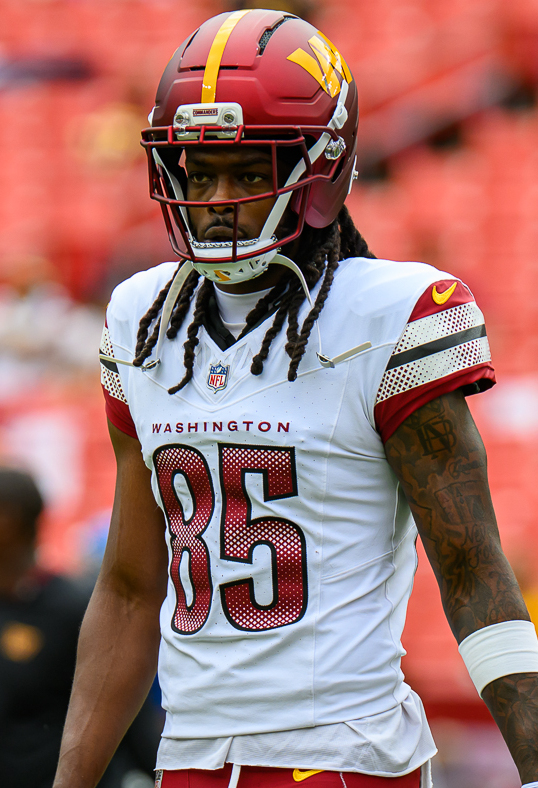
- Brown with the Washington Commanders in 2025

Profile
- Position: Wide receiver

Personal information
- Born: January 6, 1996 (age 30); Flanders, New Jersey, U.S.
- Listed height: 6 ft 2 in (1.88 m)
- Listed weight: 225 lb (102 kg)

Career information
- High school: Pope John XXIII Regional (Sparta, New Jersey)
- College: Ohio State (2014–2016)
- NFL draft: 2017: 7th round, 239th overall pick

Career history
- Dallas Cowboys (2017–2022); Houston Texans (2023); Washington Commanders (2024–2025); Las Vegas Raiders (2026)*
- * Offseason or practice squad member only

Awards and highlights
- CFP national champion (2015)

Career NFL statistics as of 2025
- Receptions: 155
- Receiving yards: 2,083
- Receiving touchdowns: 6
- Stats at Pro Football Reference

Noah Brown (born January 6, 1996) is an American professional football wide receiver. He played college football for the Ohio State Buckeyes, winning a national championship in 2015 before being selected by the Dallas Cowboys in the seventh round of the 2017 NFL draft. Brown has also played for the Houston Texans and Washington Commanders. With the Commanders in 2024, he caught a game-winning Hail Mary pass as time expired in a play known as the Hail Maryland.

== Early life ==
A resident of the Flanders section of Mount Olive Township, New Jersey, Brown attended Pope John XXIII Regional High School in Sparta, New Jersey. He missed his sophomore season after breaking his ribs in the first game. As a junior, Brown had 41 receptions for 630 yards and six touchdowns.

As a senior, Brown recorded 41 receptions for 857 yards, 14 receiving touchdowns, and seven rushing touchdowns, helping his team reach the Non-Public Group III final and receiving All-New Jersey honors by the Newark Star-Ledger. Brown committed to Ohio State University to play college football. He finished with over 3,000 all-purpose yards and 42 touchdowns, after playing at wide receiver, running back and kick returner.

Brown was a highly sought after prospect that received many offers from Virginia Tech, Notre Dame, Penn State, Michigan State, Pittsburgh, and USC. He had multiple visits to Columbus in 2013 and opted to shut down his recruiting early and commit to Ohio State five months before National Signing Day.

== College career ==
As a true freshman in 2014, Brown played in all 14 games in a backup role, including the 2015 College Football Playoff National Championship victory over Oregon. He had one reception for nine yards and one run for a 4-yard loss, while playing wide receiver, H-back and special teams.

The next year, Brown excelled in spring practice and was expected to earn the starting wide receiver job, until suffering a broken left tibia and fibula late in fall camp during a non-contact drill, forcing him to redshirt for the 2015 season. The injury was serious enough to require two separate surgeries.

As a sophomore in 2016, Brown returned and started in all 13 games. He had 32 receptions (second on the team) for 402 yards and 7 touchdowns (tied for the team lead). In the third game against the University of Oklahoma, Brown tied a school record with four receiving touchdowns, while totaling five receptions for 72 yards.

On January 7, 2017, Brown announced via Twitter that he decided to forgo his senior season and enter the NFL draft.

== Professional career ==
Many analysts were surprised that Brown decided to enter the draft and opt out of his last two years of remaining eligibility, due to his limited experience as a one-year starter and his low draft projection. Brown was one of 58 collegiate wide receivers to attend the NFL Scouting Combine in Indianapolis, Indiana. He chose to only perform the three-cone drill, short shuttle, and bench press. Brown tied for second in the bench press behind Shepherd's Billy Brown who had 23 reps, but ended up playing tight end in the NFL.

On March 23, Brown attended Ohio State's pro day along with Marshon Lattimore, Gareon Conley, Raekwon McMillan, Curtis Samuel, and five other prospects. He performed the 40-yard dash, 20-yard dash, and 10-yard dash as scouts and team representatives from all 32 NFL teams looked on, including head coaches Bill Belichick (New England Patriots), Mike Tomlin (Pittsburgh Steelers), Hue Jackson (Cleveland Browns), Mike Mularkey (Tennessee Titans), Sean Payton (New Orleans Saints), Jim Caldwell (Detroit Lions), and Marvin Lewis (Cincinnati Bengals). At the conclusion of the pre-draft process, Brown was projected to be a fifth or sixth round pick by NFL draft experts and scouts. He was ranked as the 27th best wide receiver prospect in the draft by NFLDraftScout.com.

Pre-draft measurables
Height	Weight	Arm length	Hand span	Wingspan	40-yard dash	10-yard split	20-yard split	20-yard shuttle	Three-cone drill	Bench press
6 ft 1 3/4 in (1.87 m)	222 lb (101 kg)	31 3/4 in (0.81 m)	9 1/8 in (0.23 m)	6 ft 4 5/8 in (1.95 m)	4.56 s	1.61 s	2.63 s	4.33 s	7.07 s	19 reps
All values from NFL Combine/Pro Day

=== Dallas Cowboys ===
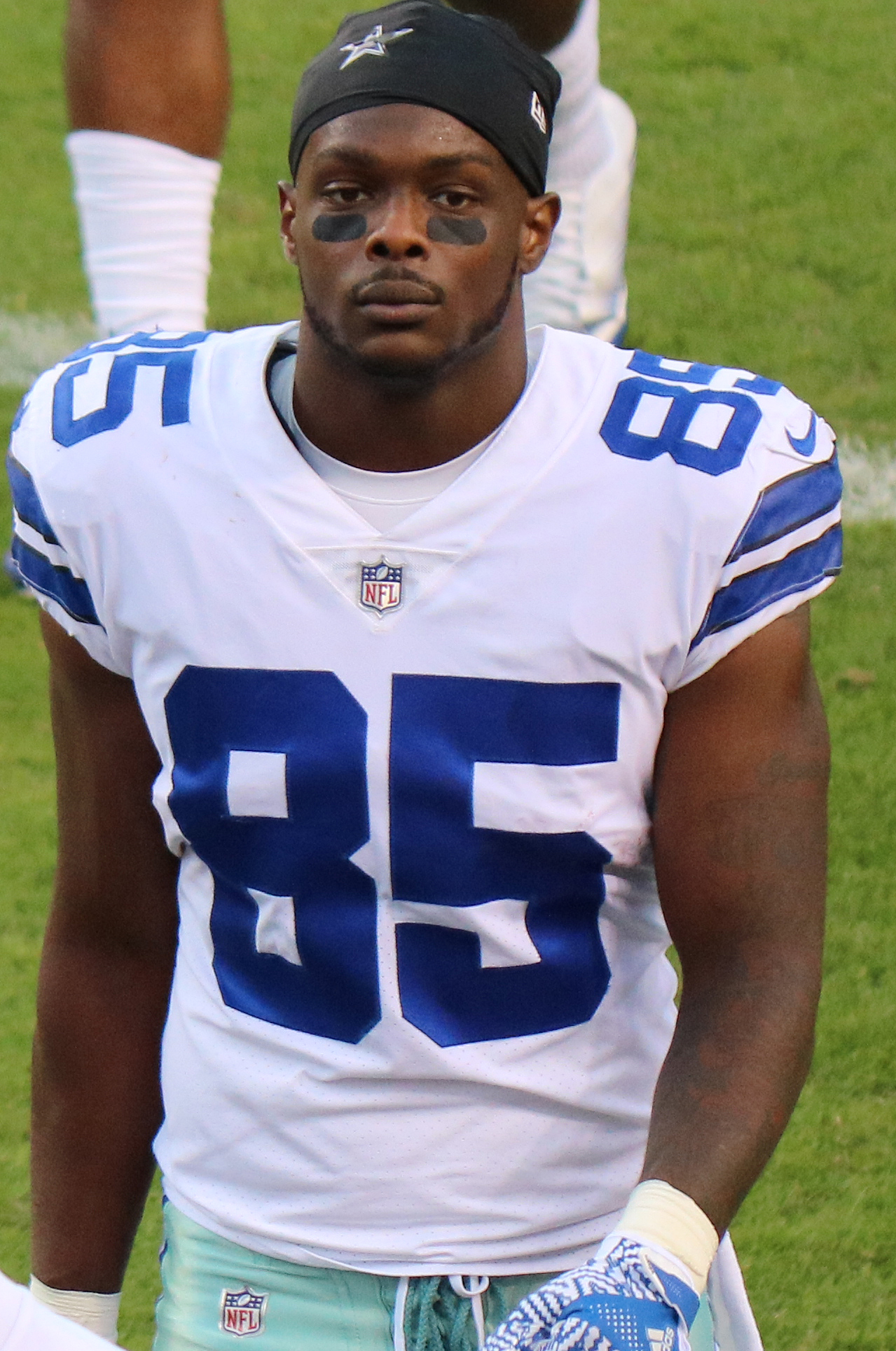
Brown with the Dallas Cowboys in 2017

==== 2017 season ====
Brown was selected by the Dallas Cowboys in the seventh round (239th overall) of the 2017 NFL draft. He was the 31st wide receiver drafted in 2017, and the second wide receiver selected by the Cowboys after North Carolina's Ryan Switzer. Cowboys' owner Jerry Jones stated that running back Ezekiel Elliott was one of the main reasons they drafted Brown, after Elliott continually advocated for his former Ohio State teammate. On May 11, 2017, the Cowboys signed Brown to a four-year, $2.47 million contract that included a signing bonus of $71,938.

Throughout training camp, Brown competed for a roster spot as the fifth or sixth wide receiver on the Cowboys' depth chart against Brice Butler, Lucky Whitehead, Andy Jones, and Lance Lenoir. Head coach Jason Garrett named Brown the sixth wide receiver on the Cowboys' depth chart, behind Dez Bryant, Terrance Williams, Cole Beasley, Butler, and Switzer.

Brown made his professional regular season debut in the Cowboys' Week 2 42–17 road loss to the Denver Broncos. The following week, he made his first career reception in the 28–17 road victory over the Arizona Cardinals. His reception came off a pass by quarterback Dak Prescott and he gained 13 yards before being tackled by Tyrann Mathieu. On November 19, Brown caught a pass for a season-long 14 yards during a 37–9 loss to the Philadelphia Eagles.

His contributions came from blocking downfield for the running game and on special teams, where he used his 6–2, 225-pound frame to his advantage. In Week 16, his blocking ability secured his first career start in the Cowboys' 21–12 loss to the Seattle Seahawks, as the offense opened with 3 receivers. He finished his rookie season with four receptions for 33 receiving yards in 13 games with one start. He was declared inactive in 3 contests.

==== 2018 season ====
Brown missed most of training camp and preseason with a hamstring injury. On September 3, 2018, he was placed on injured reserve. On November 9, he was activated off injured reserve. He started in the last 2 games of the season.

He was mostly used for his blocking abilities, appearing in 8 games with 2 starts, while registering 5 receptions for 54 yards and 5 special teams tackles (seventh on the team).

==== 2019 season ====
Brown began training camp on the physically unable to perform list, because of an offseason arthroscopic knee surgery. On August 31, he was left on the PUP list, where he spent the rest of the season. In November, he had a second surgery performed to alleviate his lingering knee issue.

==== 2020 season ====
Brown slimmed down to be more involved in the passing game, but the team's depth at wide receiver kept him mostly in a blocking and special teams role. In Week 4 against the Browns, he had 4 receptions for 43 yards.

In Week 12 against the Washington Football Team, he made 3 receptions for 40 yards. He appeared in all 16 games with one start, posting 14 receptions for 154 yards and 2 special teams tackles.

==== 2021 season ====
On March 17, 2021, Brown re-signed with the Cowboys. He was declared inactive for the season opener against the Tampa Bay Buccaneers, after being activated from the Reserve/COVID-19 list the previous day. He had 2 receptions for 47 yards against the Patriots. Although he started against the Kansas City Chiefs, substituting Amari Cooper who was placed on the Reserve/COVID-19 list, he wasn't able to record any offensive stats and dropped 2 passes.

He had 6 receptions for 53 yards against the Las Vegas Raiders on Thanksgiving Day. On December 9, he was placed on injured reserve with a groin injury. He was activated on January 1, 2022. He appeared in 13 games with one start, making 16 receptions for 184 yards and 3 special teams tackles.

==== 2022 season ====
On March 8, 2022, Brown re-signed with the Cowboys. He came into training camp leaner and quicker, to take advantage of the additional snaps available at the wide receiver position; Cooper was traded, Cedrick Wilson Jr. left in free agency and Michael Gallup was still in the process of recovering from an offseason ACL surgery.

He made 5 receptions for 68 yards in the season opener against the Buccaneers. In the second game against the Bengals, he collected 5 receptions for 91 yards, his first career touchdown and made a 12-yard reception on the final drive that helped set up the game-winning 50-yard field goal. He didn't play against the Chicago Bears because of a foot injury. He had 4 receptions for 85 yards against the Houston Texans.

His production as a receiver slowed as the season went on, contributing to the Cowboys' decision to sign veteran T.Y. Hilton on December 12. Brown had 6 receptions for 49 yards and 2 touchdowns against the Jacksonville Jaguars, but he also dropped a potential first-down reception; this gave the Jaguars the chance to mount a final drive and set up the winning field goal. In the last 3 contests of the season, he posted 3 receptions for 22 yards.

He appeared in 16 games, registering career-highs in starts (13), receptions (43), receiving yards (555), yards per reception (12.9) and touchdowns (3). He also tied for fifth on the team with 4 special teams tackles.

=== Houston Texans ===
On March 17, 2023, Brown signed a one-year contract with the Houston Texans. He was placed on injured reserve on September 13, and was activated on October 14. In a Week 10 game against the Bengals, Brown had his best career game, catching 7 passes for 172 yards as the Texans won 30–27. He would play for five more games, accumulating 12 catches for 128 yards and one touchdown to end the season. He appeared in a total of 10 games with 7 starts, making 33 receptions for 567 yards and 2 touchdowns.

In the Wild Card playoff game against the Cleveland Browns, he received one target and was unable to add to his postseason stats, playing only five snaps. On January 15, 2024, Brown was put on injured reserve, after suffering a shoulder injury on the second drive of the game.

On March 15, 2024, Brown re-signed with the Texans. On August 27, the Texans released Brown.

=== Washington Commanders ===
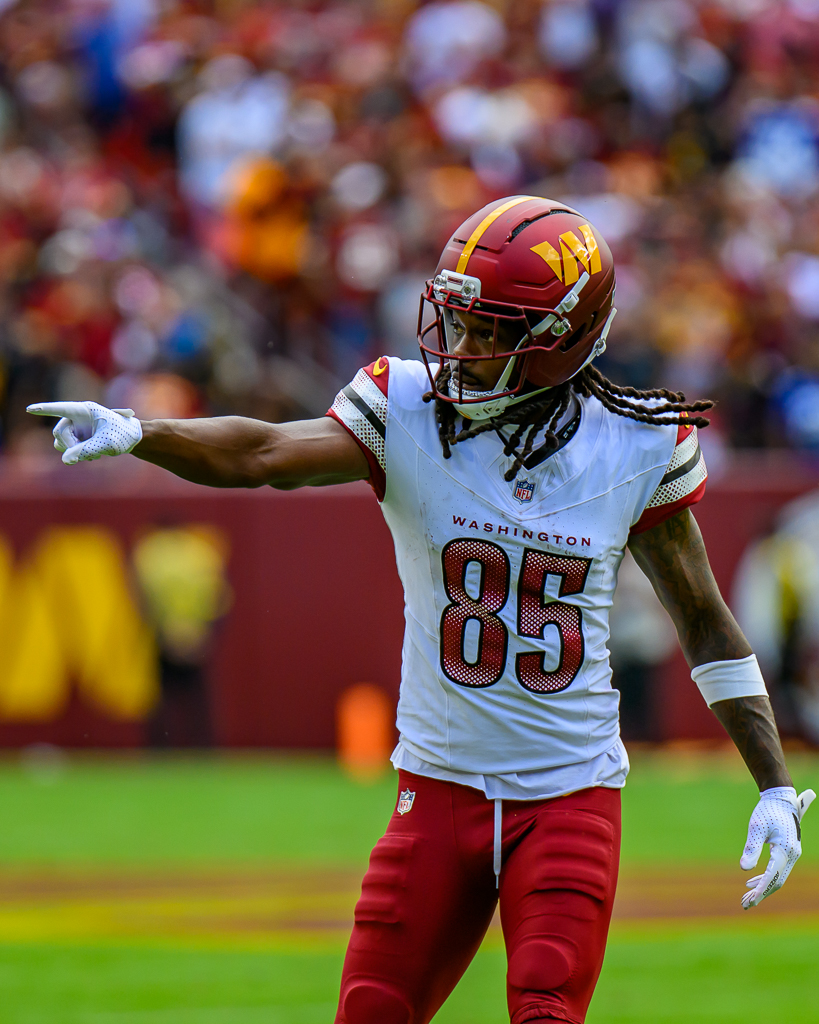
Brown playing for the Commanders in 2025

On August 29, 2024, Brown signed with the Washington Commanders. He reunited with head coach Dan Quinn, who was the defensive coordinator with the Cowboys. In Week 8 against the Chicago Bears, Brown caught a 52-yard Hail Mary pass in the endzone from rookie quarterback Jayden Daniels as time expired to win the game in a play known as the Hail Maryland. The play was later named the NFL Moment of the Year. In Week 13, Brown suffered an injury to his kidney against the Tennessee Titans and was placed on injured reserve. Prior to the injury, he appeared in 11 games with 9 starts, totaling 453 yards and one touchdown on 35 receptions.

On March 18, 2025, Brown re-signed with the Commanders on a one-year deal worth up to $4.5 million. On October 15, he was placed on injured reserve due to a groin injury. On December 6, the Commanders activated Brown ahead of their Week 14 matchup against the Minnesota Vikings. However, he suffered a rib injury in their Week 15 game against the New York Giants, and was placed back on injured reserve on December 16.

=== Las Vegas Raiders ===
On August 16, 2026, Brown signed with the Las Vegas Raiders. On August 24, Brown was waived by the Raiders.

== NFL career statistics ==
Legend
**Bold**	Career high

=== Regular season ===
General				Receiving					
Year	Team	GP	GS	Tgt	Rec	Yards	Y/R	Y/G	TD
2017	DAL	13	1	9	4	33	8.3	2.5	0
2018	DAL	8	2	8	5	54	10.8	6.8	0
2019	DAL	Did not play due to injury							
2020	DAL	16	1	24	14	154	11.0	9.6	0
2021	DAL	13	1	25	16	184	11.5	14.2	0
2022	DAL	16	13	**74**	**43**	555	12.9	34.7	**3**
2023	HOU	10	7	55	33	**567**	**17.2**	**56.7**	2
2024	WAS	11	9	56	35	453	12.9	41.2	1
2025	WAS	4	4	10	5	83	16.6	20.8	0
Career		91	38	261	155	2,083	13.4	22.9	6

=== Postseason ===
General				Receiving					
Year	Team	GP	GS	Tgt	Rec	Yards	Y/R	Y/G	TD
2018	DAL	2	0	**5**	2	19	9.5	9.5	0
2021	DAL	1	0	0	0	0	0.0	0.0	0
2022	DAL	2	0	4	**4**	**39**	**9.8**	**19.5**	0
2023	HOU	1	1	1	0	0	0.0	0.0	0
2024	WAS	0	0	Did not play due to injury					
Career		6	1	10	6	58	9.7	9.7	0
