= John Wurts =

Member of the U.S. House of Representatives

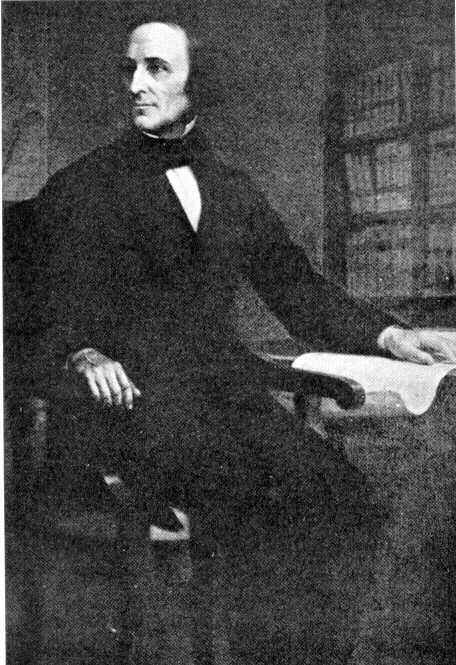
- John Wurts, US Representative from Pennsylvania

Member of the U.S. House of Representatives from Pennsylvania's 1st district
- In office March 4, 1825 – March 4, 1827
- Preceded by: Daniel H. Miller
- Succeeded by: Joel Barlow Sutherland

United States District Attorney
- In office 1827–1831

Personal details
- Born: August 13, 1792 Flanders, New Jersey, U.S.
- Died: April 23, 1861 (aged 68) Rome, Papal States (now Italy)
- Resting place: Pleasant Mills, Atlantic County, New Jersey
- Education: Princeton College
- Profession: Lawyer; Politician; Business executive

John Wurts (August 13, 1792 – April 23, 1861) was a member of the U.S. House of Representatives from Pennsylvania and a president of the Delaware and Hudson Canal Company.

== Biography ==
Wurts was born in Flanders, New Jersey on August 13, 1792. After his father's death in 1793, the family relocated to Montville, New Jersey, and then relocated again, this time to Philadelphia, Pennsylvania. He graduated from Princeton College in 1813, studied law, was admitted to the bar in 1816, and began to practice law in Philadelphia.

He was a member of the Pennsylvania House of Representatives in 1817 and served in the Pennsylvania State Senate in 1820.

Wurts was elected to the Nineteenth Congress, but was not a candidate for renomination. From 1827 to 1831, he served as a United States district attorney and was a member of the Philadelphia City Council.

Along with his brothers William, Maurice, and Charles, he helped found the Delaware and Hudson Canal Company and served as its president from 1831 to 1858.

== Illness, death and interment ==
Although he traveled abroad for his health in 1859, Wurts failed to recover and died in Rome in 1861. At the time of his death, Rome was under the direct rule of the Pope, with Italian unification not reaching completion until 1871. His remains were returned to the United States and interred in the family cemetery at Pleasant Mills, New Jersey, near Batsto, New Jersey.

== Sources ==
- United States Congress. "John Wurts (id: W000774)". Biographical Directory of the United States Congress.
- The Political Graveyard

U.S. House of Representatives
Preceded by Daniel H. Miller	Member of the U.S. House of Representatives from Pennsylvania's 1st congressional district 1825–1827	Succeeded by Joel Barlow Sutherland
