= Albert Wurts Whitney =

Albert Wurts Whitney (June 20, 1870, Geneva, Illinois – July 27, 1943) was a statistician and actuarial scientist, known for his role in the application of Bayes' rule to the development of standards in setting insurance premiums for workmen's compensation. He was a pioneer in accident prevention work and public safety education.

The son of Reverend Henry Mitchell Whitney, Albert W. Whitney was part of the Dwight family of New England. He graduated from Beloit College in 1891 and married Martha Reynolds Bill in 1899.

From 1922 to 1924 Whitney was the chair of the American Engineering Standards Committee. In 1924 he was an Invited Speaker of the ICM in Toronto.
