= Naya Vialva =

U.S. Virgin Islands soccer player

Personal information
- Position: Defender

College career
Years	Team	Apps	(Gls)
2019–2021	La Salle Explorers	41	(0)
2022	Rutgers Scarlet Knights	2	(0)
2023	Grambling State Tigers	10	(2)

Senior career*
Years	Team	Apps	(Gls)
- Morris Elite SC

International career
2023–	United States Virgin Islands		
- * Club domestic league appearances and goals

Naya Vialva is a soccer player who plays as a defender. Born in the mainland United States, she plays for the U.S. Virgin Islands women's national team.

== Early life ==
Vialva is the daughter of Mona Ressaissi and Devon Vialva. Raised in Mount Olive Township, New Jersey, she played prep soccer at Mount Olive High School.

== Club career ==
Vialva played for the Princeton Soccer Academy, helping the club win the league championship.

== International career ==
Vialva represented the United States Virgin Islands internationally at 2024 CONCACAF W Gold Cup qualification.

== International goals ==
No.	Date	Venue	Opponent	Score	Result	Competition
1.	27 November 2025	Bethlehem Soccer Complex, Kingshill, U.S. Virgin Islands	Saint Lucia	1–0	3–1	2026 CONCACAF W Championship qualification

== Style of play ==
Vialva mainly operates as a central defender.

== Personal life ==
Vialva has a brother and two sisters.
