= Mount Olive Township, New Jersey =

Township in Morris County, New Jersey, US

- Township
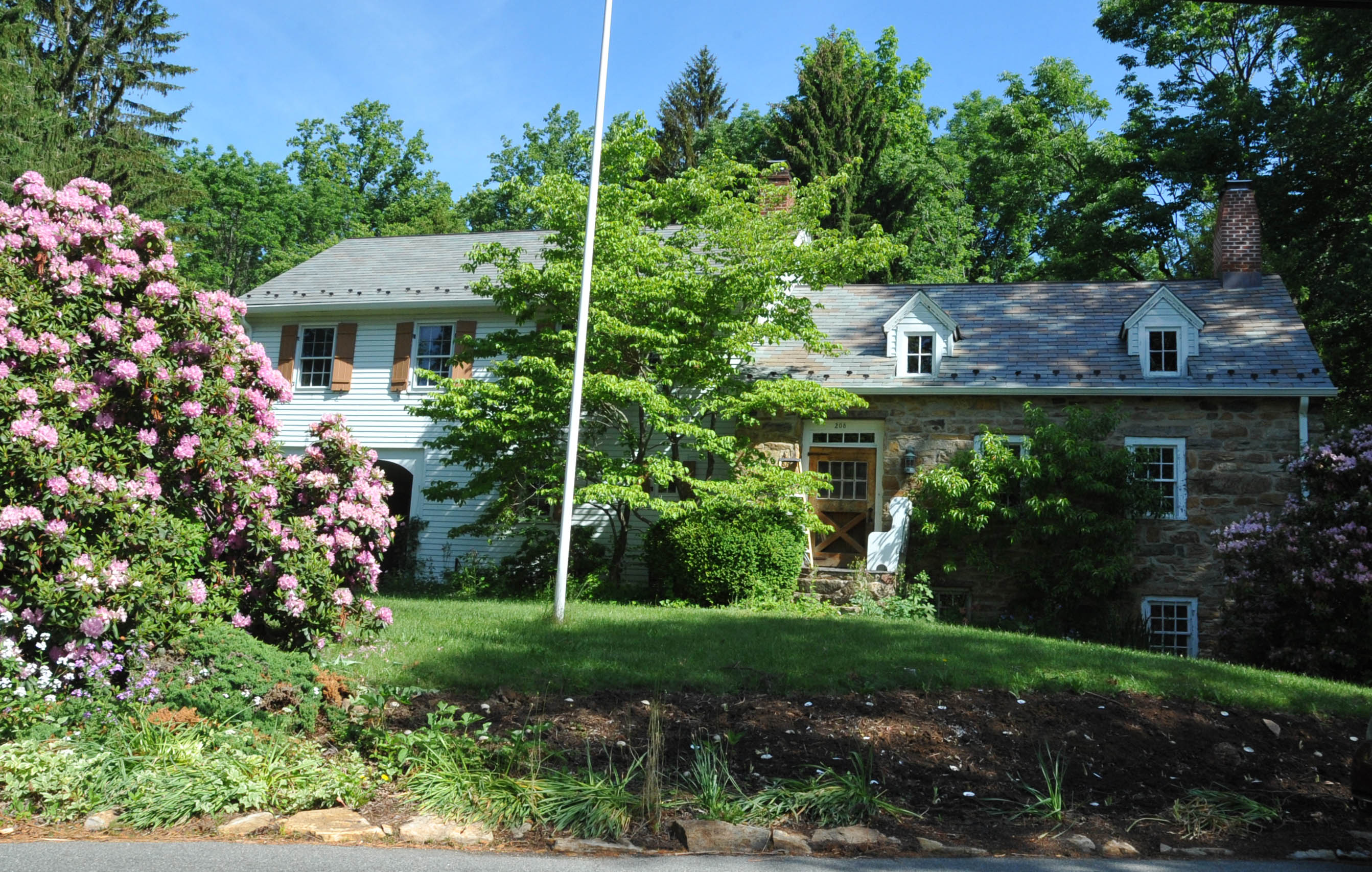
- Lewis Carey Farmhouse located in Flanders

- Seal
- Interactive map of Mount Olive Township, New Jersey
- Location in Morris County Location in New Jersey Location in the United States
- Coordinates: 40.865597°N 74.74193°W
- Country: United States
- State: New Jersey
- County: Morris
- Incorporated: March 22, 1871
- Named for: Benjamin Olive

Government
  - Type: Faulkner Act (mayor–council)
  - Body: Township Council
  - Mayor: Joe Nicastro (R, term ends December 31, 2027)
  - Administrator: Andrew Tatarenko
  - Municipal clerk: Michelle Masser

Area
  - Total: 31.24 sq mi (80.92 km^{2})
  - Land: 29.62 sq mi (76.71 km^{2})
  - Water: 1.63 sq mi (4.21 km^{2}) 5.21%
  - Rank: 83rd of 565 in state 4th of 39 in county
- Elevation: 948 ft (289 m)

Population (2020)
  - Total: 28,886
  - Estimate (2023): 29,249
  - Rank: 84th of 565 in state 2nd of 39 in county
  - Density: 975.3/sq mi (376.6/km^{2})
  - Rank: 387th of 565 in state 29th of 39 in county
- Time zone: UTC−05:00 (Eastern (EST))
  - Summer (DST): UTC−04:00 (Eastern (EDT))
- ZIP Codes: 07828 – Budd Lake; 07836 – Flanders
- Area codes: 908 and 973
- FIPS code: 3402749080
- GNIS feature ID: 0882197
- Website: www.mountolivetwpnj.org

Mount Olive Township is a township in western Morris County, in the U.S. state of New Jersey. As of the 2020 United States census, the township's population was 28,886, its highest decennial census count ever and an increase of 769 (+2.7%) from the 2010 census count of 28,117, which in turn reflected an increase of 3,924 (+16.2%) from the 24,193 counted in the 2000 census.

The Township of Mount Olive was formed by an act of the New Jersey Legislature on March 22, 1871, from portions of Roxbury Township. Netcong was formed from portions of the township on October 23, 1894. The township was named for Benjamin Olive, a colonial-era Lieutenant Governor of New Jersey who donated land for the sites of churches constructed in the area.

The township comprises the unincorporated communities of Budd Lake and Flanders. Located within the Raritan Valley region, Mount Olive is situated in western Morris County bordering both Sussex and Warren counties along the Musconetcong River.

== Geography ==
According to the United States Census Bureau, the township had a total area of 31.24 square miles (80.92 km^{2}), including 29.62 square miles (76.71 km^{2}) of land and 1.63 square miles (4.21 km^{2}) of water (5.21%).

Budd Lake (with a 2020 Census population of 9,784) and Flanders (9,832) are unincorporated communities and census-designated places (CDP) located within Mount Olive Township.

Other unincorporated communities, localities and place names located partially or completely within the township include Bartley, Saxton Falls and Waterloo.

The township borders the municipalities of Chester Township, Netcong, Roxbury, and Washington Township in Morris County; Stanhope in Sussex County; and Allamuchy and Hackettstown in Warren County.

== Demographics ==
Historical population
Census	Pop.	Note	%±
1880	1,982		—
1890	1,848		−6.8%
1900	1,221	*	−33.9%
1910	1,160		−5.0%
1920	1,008		−13.1%
1930	1,235		22.5%
1940	1,526		23.6%
1950	2,597		70.2%
1960	3,807		46.6%
1970	10,394		173.0%
1980	18,748		80.4%
1990	21,282		13.5%
2000	24,193		13.7%
2010	28,117		16.2%
2020	28,886		2.7%
2023 (est.)	29,249		1.3%
Population sources: 1880–1920 1880–1890; 1890–1910 1910–1930 1940–2000; 2000 2010 2020 * = Lost territory in previous decade.

=== 2020 census ===
Mount Olive township, Morris County, New Jersey – Racial and Ethnic Composition (NH = Non-Hispanic) Note: the US Census treats Hispanic/Latino as an ethnic category. This table excludes Latinos from the racial categories and assigns them to a separate category. Hispanics/Latinos may be of any race.
Race / Ethnicity	Pop 2010	Pop 2020	% 2010	% 2020
White alone (NH)	20,522	18,399	72.99%	63.70%
Black or African American alone (NH)	1,514	1,807	5.38%	6.26%
Native American or Alaska Native alone (NH)	40	12	0.14%	0.04%
Asian alone (NH)	2,297	3,025	8.17%	10.47%
Pacific Islander alone (NH)	5	3	0.02%	0.01%
Some Other Race alone (NH)	71	141	0.25%	0.49%
Mixed Race/Multi-Racial (NH)	431	1,039	1.53%	3.60%
Hispanic or Latino (any race)	3,237	4,460	11.51%	15.44%
Total	28,117	28,886	100.00%	100.00%

=== 2010 census ===
The 2010 United States census counted 28,117 people, 10,690 households, and 7,323 families in the township. The population density was 956.1 per square mile (369.2/km^{2}). There were 11,244 housing units at an average density of 382.4 per square mile (147.6/km^{2}). The racial makeup was 80.66% (22,679) White, 5.74% (1,614) Black or African American, 0.20% (55) Native American, 8.23% (2,315) Asian, 0.04% (12) Pacific Islander, 2.86% (805) from other races, and 2.27% (637) from two or more races. Hispanic or Latino of any race were 11.51% (3,237) of the population.

Of the 10,690 households, 36.9% had children under the age of 18; 55.7% were married couples living together; 8.8% had a female householder with no husband present and 31.5% were non-families. Of all households, 25.8% were made up of individuals and 6.9% had someone living alone who was 65 years of age or older. The average household size was 2.63 and the average family size was 3.22.

26.3% of the population were under the age of 18, 7.2% from 18 to 24, 29.6% from 25 to 44, 27.9% from 45 to 64, and 9.0% who were 65 years of age or older. The median age was 37.8 years. For every 100 females, the population had 97.3 males. For every 100 females ages 18 and older there were 94.6 males.

The Census Bureau's 2006–2010 American Community Survey showed that (in 2010 inflation-adjusted dollars) median household income was $77,243 (with a margin of error of +/− $5,287) and the median family income was $102,448 (+/− $8,454). Males had a median income of $70,532 (+/− $5,545) versus $52,205 (+/− $4,050) for females. The per capita income for the borough was $37,758 (+/− $1,723). About 3.8% of families and 5.8% of the population were below the poverty line, including 6.7% of those under age 18 and 6.1% of those age 65 or over.

=== 2000 census ===
As of the 2000 United States census there were 24,193 people, 9,068 households, and 6,374 families residing in the township. The population density was 797.0 inhabitants per square mile (307.7/km^{2}). There were 9,311 housing units at an average density of 306.7 per square mile (118.4/km^{2}). The racial makeup of the township was 86.69% White, 3.79% African American, 0.17% Native American, 6.00% Asian, 0.01% Pacific Islander, 1.53% from other races, and 1.81% from two or more races. Hispanic or Latino of any race were 5.97% of the population.

There were 9,068 households, out of which 39.0% had children under the age of 18 living with them, 59.6% were married couples living together, 7.4% had a female householder with no husband present, and 29.7% were non-families. 23.7% of all households were made up of individuals, and 5.1% had someone living alone who was 65 years of age or older. The average household size was 2.66 and the average family size was 3.22.

In the township the population was spread out, with 27.6% under the age of 18, 6.8% from 18 to 24, 37.6% from 25 to 44, 21.7% from 45 to 64, and 6.4% who were 65 years of age or older. The median age was 34 years. For every 100 females, there were 100.4 males. For every 100 females age 18 and over, there were 98.3 males.

The median income for a household in the township was $64,515, and the median income for a family was $75,189. Males had a median income of $50,653 versus $35,882 for females. The per capita income for the township was $28,691. About 1.7% of families and 3.1% of the population were below the poverty line, including 3.1% of those under age 18 and 3.5% of those age 65 or over.

== Government ==
=== Local government ===
Effective January 1, 1972, the voters in the Township approved a change to a Mayor-Council form of government, governed by a directly elected mayor and a seven-member Township Council elected on an at-large basis. The mayor operates the government with the assistance of a Township Administrator, with the Council performing a legislative role. Starting from its inception in 1871, Mount Olive had been governed under the Township form of municipal government, by a three-person Township Committee, which was expanded to five members in 1968.

Mount Olive Township is governed under the Optional Municipal Charter Law's (Faulkner Act) Mayor-Council form of government (Plan E), enacted based on the recommendations of a Charter Study Commission. The governing body is comprised of the Mayor and the Township Council and provides for a "strong mayor", with a separately elected mayor and council. The township is one of 71 municipalities (of the 564) statewide that use this form of government. The mayor, who is elected directly by the voters, is the chief executive officer of the township. The mayor is responsible for carrying out all Council decisions and for the day-to-day operation of all functions of the municipality. The Township Council is comprised of seven members, who are elected on an at-large basis with staggered terms in elections held in odd-numbered years with either three seats or four seats coming up for vote; the mayor is up for election the same year that three council seats are up for vote. The Township Council is the legislative branch of the government and is responsible for approving the municipal budget and enacting ordinances. The council elects a Council President from among its members at an annual reorganization meeting. The Council President presides at all council meetings.

As of 2025, the mayor of Mount Olive Township is Democrat Joe Nicastro, who has replaced Robert Greenbaum, whose term of office ended December 31, 2023. Members of the Township Council are Council President Alex Roman(R, 2023), Council Vice President Charles Aaron Jr. (R, 2025; appointed to serve an unexpired term), John Ferrante (R, 2025), Colleen Labow (R, 2023), John Mania (R, 2025), Mary Lalama, and Raffaele Ruggiero.

In January 2023, Chuck Aaron was sworn in to fill the seat expiring in December 2025 that became vacant following the death of Daniel Amianda the previous November. Aaron will serve on an interim basis until the November 2023 general election, when voters will select a candidate to fill the balance of the term of office.

In July 2015, the Township Council selected Gregory Stewart from three candidates nominated by the Republican municipal committee to fill the seat expiring in December 2017 that had been held by Ray Perkins until his resignation from office to move out of the township, after having served 13 years in office; Stewart will serve on an interim basis until the November 2016 general election, when voters will choose a candidate to serve the one year remaining on the term of office.

Serving a term ending December 2013, Patrick Walsh resigned from office in February 2013, citing internal conflicts in the township's Republican Party government.

=== Federal, state and county representation ===
Mount Olive Township is located in the 7th Congressional District and is part of New Jersey's 24th state legislative district.

For the 119th United States Congress, New Jersey's 7th congressional district is represented by Thomas Kean Jr. (R, Westfield). New Jersey is represented in the United States Senate by Democrats Cory Booker (Newark, term ends 2027) and Andy Kim (Moorestown, term ends 2031).

For the 2026–2027 session, the 24th legislative district of the New Jersey Legislature is represented in the State Senate by Parker Space (R, Wantage Township) and in the General Assembly by Dawn Fantasia (R, Franklin) and Mike Inganamort (R, Chester Township).

Morris County is governed by a Board of County Commissioners comprised of seven members who are elected at-large in partisan elections to three-year terms on a staggered basis, with either one or three seats up for election each year as part of the November general election. Actual day-to-day operation of departments is supervised by County Administrator Deena Leary.

As of 2026, Morris County's Commissioners (with all terms ending December 31) are Director Stephen H. Shaw (R, Mountain Lakes, 2027), Deputy Director John Krickus (R, Washington Township, 2027), Douglas Cabana (R, Boonton Township, 2028), Thomas J. Mastrangelo (R, Montville, 2028), Christine Myers (R, Harding Township, 2028), Tayfun Selen (R, Chatham Township, 2026), and Deborah Smith (R, Denville Township, 2027).

The county's constitutional officers are County Clerk Ann F. Grossi (R, Parsippany–Troy Hills, 2028), Sheriff James M. Gannon (R, Boonton Township, 2025) and Surrogate Heather Darling (R, Roxbury, 2029).

=== Politics ===
United States presidential election results for Mount Olive Township 2024 2020 2016 2012 2008 2004
Year	Republican		Democratic		Third party(ies)	
Year	No.	%	No.	%	No.	%
2024	7,555	50.49%	7,044	47.07%	365	2.44%
2020	7,484	46.92%	8,206	51.45%	259	1.62%
2016	6,511	51.67%	5,590	44.36%	501	3.98%
2012	5,664	53.27%	4,855	45.66%	113	1.06%
2008	6,191	53.18%	5,327	45.76%	123	1.06%
2004	6,330	59.11%	4,287	40.04%	91	0.85%

As of March 2011, there were a total of 15,159 registered voters in Mount Olive Township, of which 2,984 (19.7%) were registered as Democrats, 4,930 (32.5%) were registered as Republicans and 7,226 (47.7%) were registered as Unaffiliated. There were 19 voters registered as Libertarians or Greens.

In the 2024 presidential election, 14,593 ballots were cast from a potential of 22,176 registered voters marking 65.8% participation. Republican and former president Donald Trump received 50.5% of the vote (7375 votes) and Democrat Vice President Kamala Harris received 46.1% (6732 votes.) Notable other candidates included Robert F. Kennedy Jr. (RFK) who received 88 votes and Jill Stein receiving 174. In the 2012 presidential election, Republican Mitt Romney received 53.3% of the vote (5,664 cast), ahead of Democrat Barack Obama with 45.7% (4,855 votes), and other candidates with 1.1% (113 votes), among the 10,691 ballots cast by the township's 16,433 registered voters (59 ballots were spoiled), for a turnout of 65.1%. In the 2008 presidential election, Republican John McCain received 52.9% of the vote (6,191 cast), ahead of Democrat Barack Obama with 45.5% (5,327 votes) and other candidates with 1.1% (123 votes), among the 11,705 ballots cast by the township's 15,776 registered voters, for a turnout of 74.2%. In the 2004 presidential election, Republican George W. Bush received 59.0% of the vote (6,330 ballots cast), outpolling Democrat John Kerry with 39.9% (4,287 votes) and other candidates with 0.6% (91 votes), among the 10,731 ballots cast by the township's 14,794 registered voters, for a turnout percentage of 72.5.

Gubernatorial election results for Mount Olive Township
Year	Republican		Democratic		Third party(ies)	
Year	No.	%	No.	%	No.	%
2025	5,345	47.30%	5,909	52.29%	47	0.42%
2021	5,004	55.66%	3,915	43.55%	71	0.79%
2017	3,653	53.93%	2,960	43.70%	161	2.38%
2013	4,315	70.78%	1,655	27.15%	126	2.07%
2009	4,663	63.84%	1,995	27.31%	646	8.84%
2005	3,812	59.03%	2,402	37.19%	244	3.78%

In the 2013 gubernatorial election, Republican Chris Christie received 70.8% of the vote (4,315 cast), ahead of Democrat Barbara Buono with 27.1% (1,655 votes), and other candidates with 2.1% (126 votes), among the 6,158 ballots cast by the township's 16,376 registered voters (62 ballots were spoiled), for a turnout of 37.6%. In the 2009 gubernatorial election, Republican Chris Christie received 63.4% of the vote (4,663 ballots cast), ahead of Democrat Jon Corzine with 27.1% (1,995 votes), Independent Chris Daggett with 8.1% (596 votes) and other candidates with 0.7% (50 votes), among the 7,351 ballots cast by the township's 15,468 registered voters, yielding a 47.5% turnout.

United States Senate election results for Mount Olive Township1
Year	Republican		Democratic		Third party(ies)	
Year	No.	%	No.	%	No.	%
2024	6,907	49.22%	6,775	48.28%	350	2.49%
2018	5,310	52.54%	4,433	43.86%	364	3.60%
2012	5,152	52.49%	4,507	45.92%	156	1.59%
2006	4,019	60.02%	2,513	37.53%	164	2.45%

United States Senate election results for Mount Olive Township2
Year	Republican		Democratic		Third party(ies)	
Year	No.	%	No.	%	No.	%
2020	7,260	46.95%	7,928	51.27%	276	1.78%
2014	2,777	56.48%	2,063	41.96%	77	1.57%
2013	2,361	57.19%	1,723	41.74%	44	1.07%
2008	5,736	55.27%	4,378	42.18%	265	2.55%

== Education ==
The Mount Olive Township School District serves public school students in pre-kindergarten through twelfth grade. As of the 2021–22 school year, the district, comprised of six schools, had an enrollment of 4,583 students and 405.0 classroom teachers (on an FTE basis), for a student–teacher ratio of 11.3:1. Schools in the district (with 2021–22 enrollment data from the National Center for Education Statistics) are Mountain View Elementary School with 488 students in grades PreK-5, Sandshore Elementary School with 462 students in grades K-5, Chester M. Stephens Elementary School with 655 students in grades K-5, Tinc Road Elementary School with 404 students in grades K-5, Mount Olive Middle School with 1,098 students in grades 6-8 and Mount Olive High School with 1,468 students in grades 9-12.

== Public library ==
The Mount Olive Public Library serves the informational, educational, cultural, and recreational resource of the township. It is the objective of the Library to serve the community with programs, books and other media. The Mount Olive Township Library Association was incorporated in 1976. In 1979, a major addition was added to the original octagon. In 1985, the township held a referendum with voters overwhelmingly in favor of municipalization. The Library officially became a municipal library in 1986. In 1991, a second addition was added to include an administrative area and the periodical/reading room. In January 2005 the new library which was built on Flanders-Drakestown Road opened for residents.

== Transportation ==
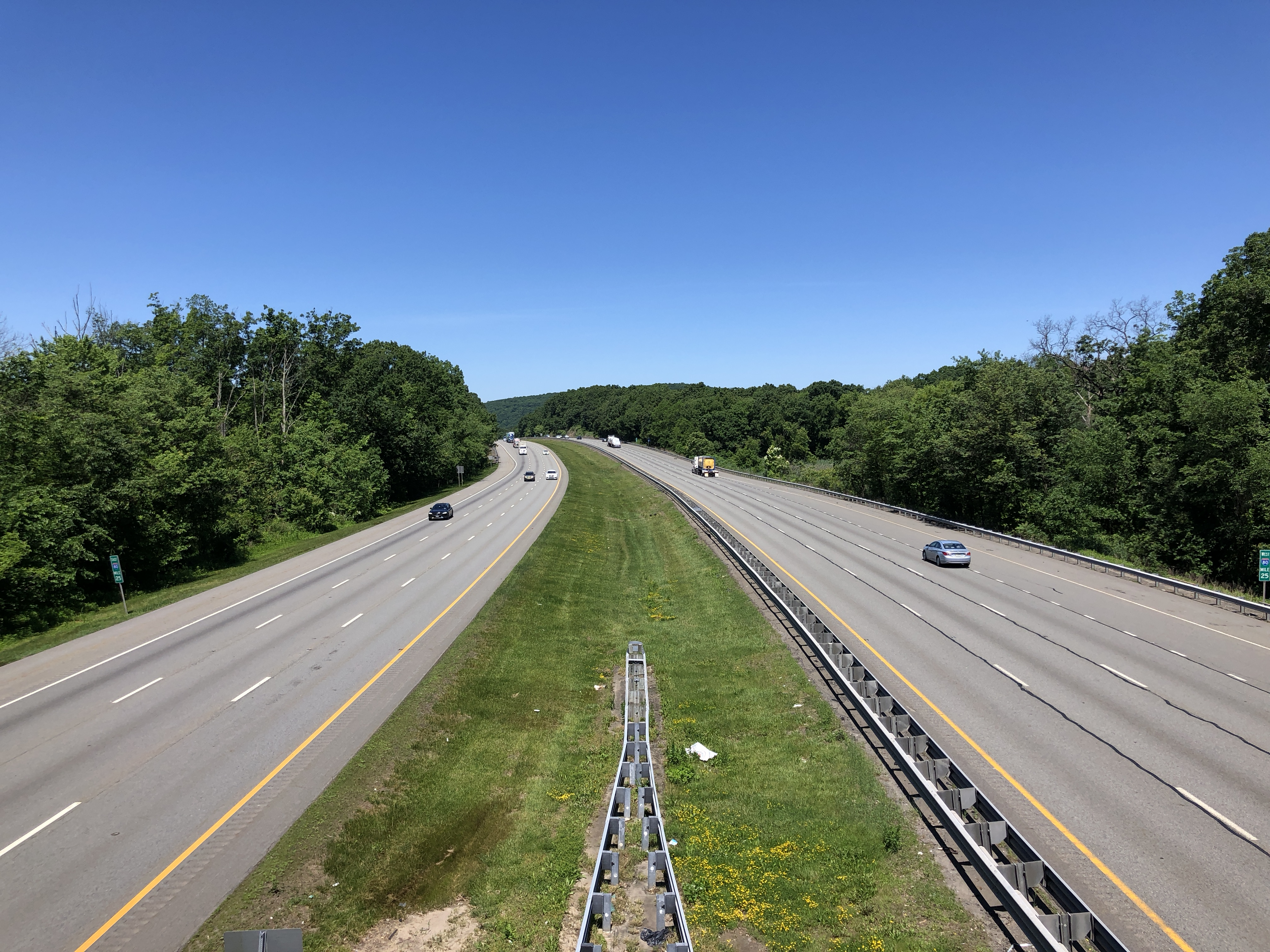
Interstate 80 westbound in Mount Olive Township

=== Roads and highways ===
As of May 2010, the township had a total of 140.17 miles (225.58 km) of roadways, of which 115.11 miles (185.25 km) were maintained by the municipality, 10.03 miles (16.14 km) by Morris County and 15.03 miles (24.19 km) by the New Jersey Department of Transportation.

The major roads that pass through include U.S. Route 46 through the center, U.S. Route 206 in the east and northeast part (called the "Netcong Bypass") and Interstate 80 (Bergen Passaic Expressway) in the north (which is also briefly concurrent with US 206).

=== Public transportation ===
Commuter rail service is offered by NJ Transit at the Mount Olive station along its Morris & Essex Lines and Montclair-Boonton Line, offering service to Hoboken Terminal in Hoboken, New Jersey, Newark Broad Street Station, Secaucus Junction and New York Penn Station in Midtown Manhattan.

NJ Transit local bus service had been offered on the MCM5 route until 2010, when subsidies offered to the local service provider were eliminated as part of budget cuts.

Bus service is provided along Route 46 between Netcong and Dover on the Morris On the Move (M.O.M.) route.

== Points of interest ==
The Seward Mansion was added to the National Register of Historic Places on December 24, 2013, for its significance in architecture.

The Mount Olive Village Historic District was added to the National Register of Historic Places on August 3, 2015 It includes the Mount Olive Baptist Church and Schoolhouse.

Vasa Park is a community of summer and retirement homes operated by District 6 of the Vasa Order of America, a Swedish cultural society. Established in 1936 on a former farm covering 126 acres (51 ha), the park includes picnic and recreational facilities, a banquet hall and a research library.

Pax Amicus Castle Theatre is a community theater on Budd Lake built in 1970 and designed to look like a medieval castle.

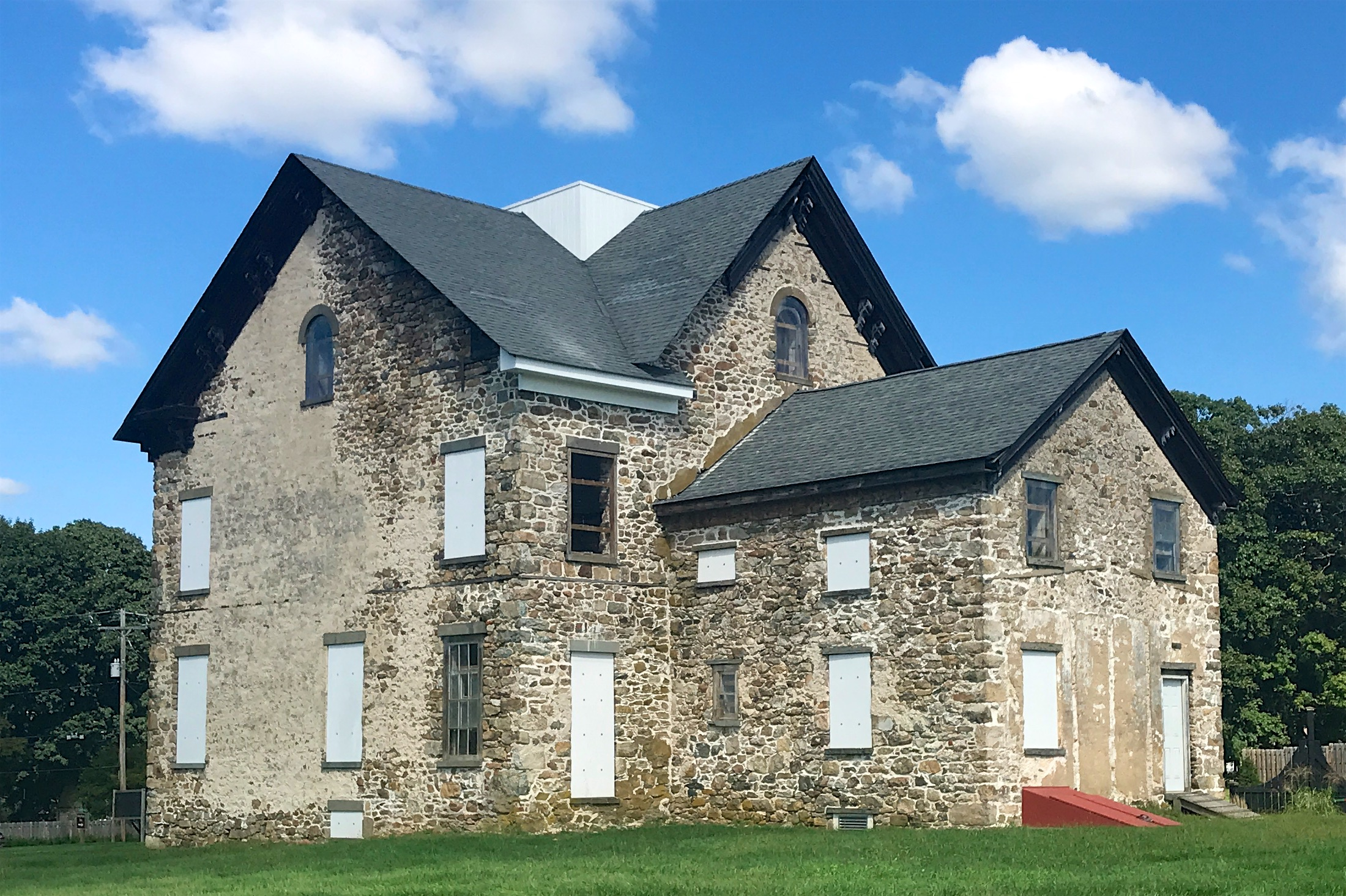
Seward Mansion, built c. 1865

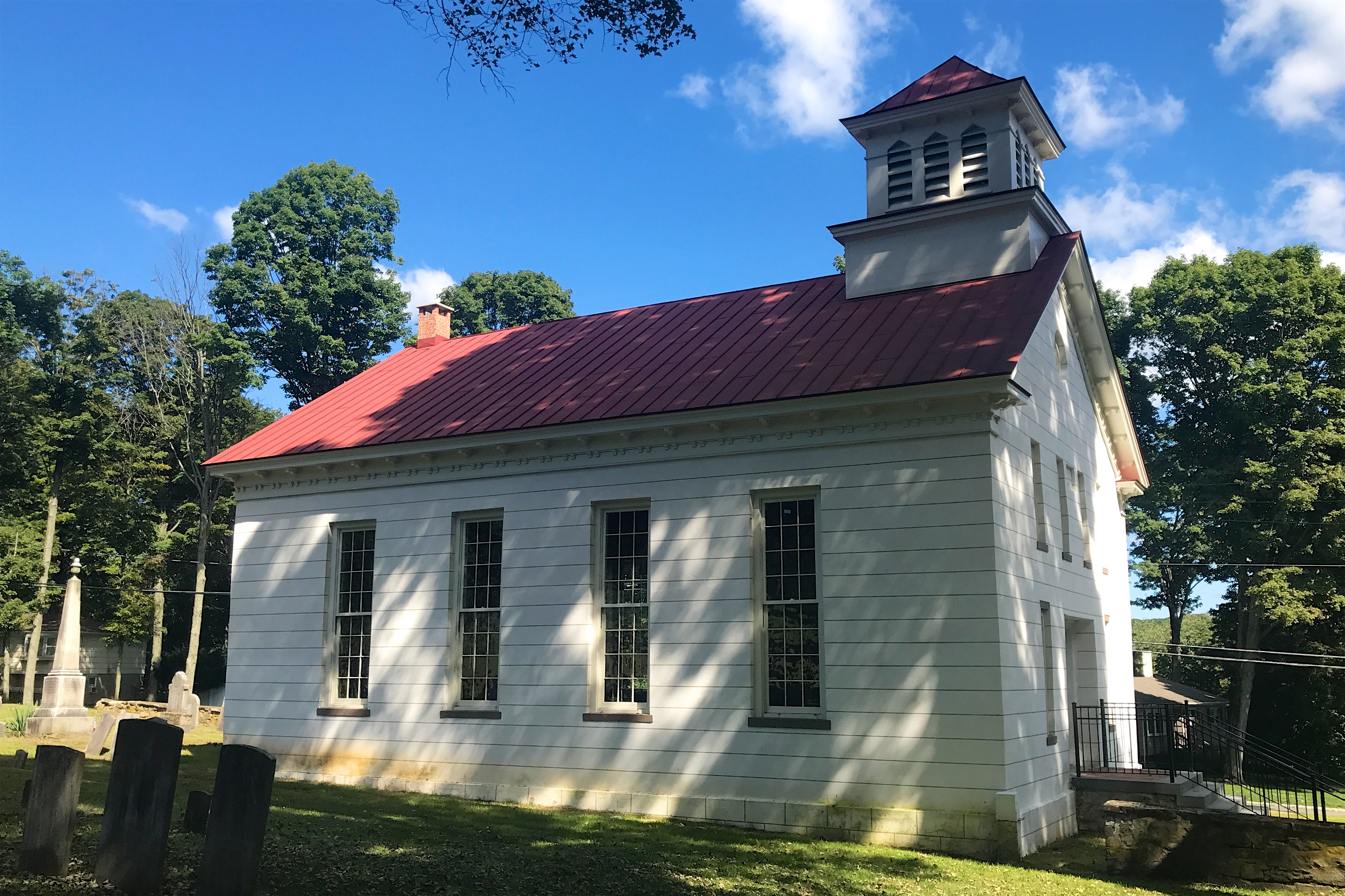
Mount Olive Baptist Meeting House, built 1855

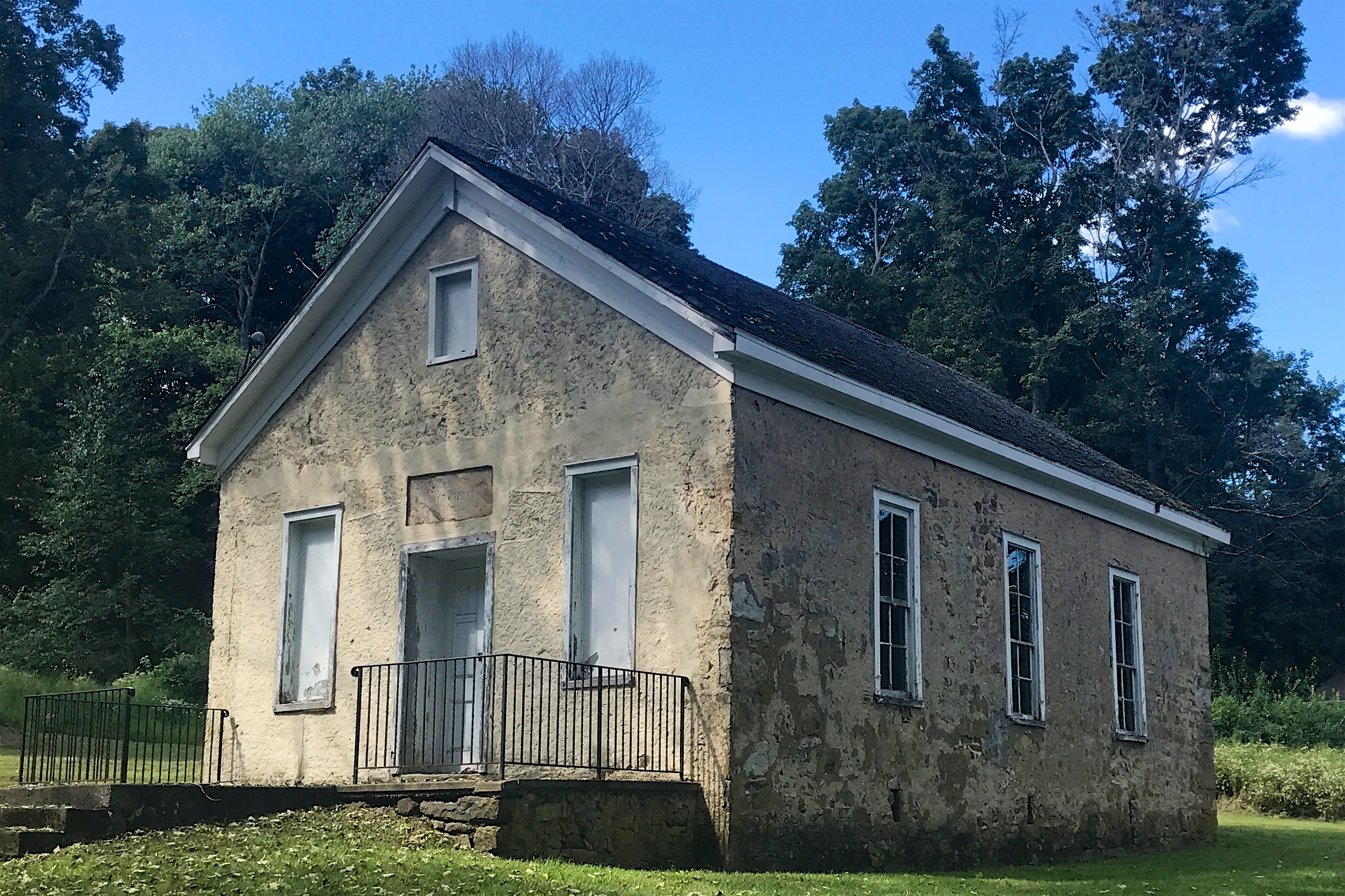
Mount Olive Academy, built 1837

== Notable people ==
People who were born in, residents of, or otherwise closely associated with Mount Olive Township include:

- Kenny Agostino (born 1992), ice hockey forward who played for the New Jersey Devils
- Liam Anderson (born 2000), American football linebacker for the Indianapolis Colts of the National Football League
- Noah Brown (born 1996), wide receiver who played college football at Ohio State
- Mariann Budde (born 1959), prelate of the Episcopal Church who has served as the bishop of Washington since November 2011
- Tim Jacobus (born 1959), artist best known for illustrating the covers for nearly one hundred books in R. L. Stine's Goosebumps series
- Jonathan Nicholas (1757/59–1839), early settler of Flanders who served as a sergeant in the American Revolutionary War
- Keturah Orji (born 1996), track and field athlete specializing in the triple jump who was selected as part of the U.S. team at the 2016 Summer Olympics
- David W. K. Peacock Jr. (1924–2005), government official and businessman who served as a Deputy Undersecretary at the Department of Commerce during the Nixon Administration
- PES (born 1973 as Adam Pesapane), Oscar and Emmy-nominated director and stop-motion animator, whose short film Fresh Guacamole was nominated for the Academy Award for Best Animated Short Film in 2013
- Ryan Peterson (born 1995), professional footballer who plays for the Charlotte Independence in USL League One
- Jen Ponton (born 1984), actress, screenwriter and producer, best known for portraying Rubi in the AMC series Dietland
- Lee Rouson (born 1962), former NFL running back for the New York Giants
- Daniel Elmer Salmon (1850–1914), veterinarian educated at Cornell University and graduated with the first Doctor of Veterinary Medicine degree in the United States
- Joshua S. Salmon (1846–1902), represented the 4th congressional district March 4, 1899 – May 6, 1902
- Steve Slattery (born 1980), track and field athlete who is a steeplechase specialist
- Naya Vialva, footballer who plays as a defender for the United States Virgin Islands women's national soccer team
