= Charles Stewart Wurts =

American businessman (1790–1859)

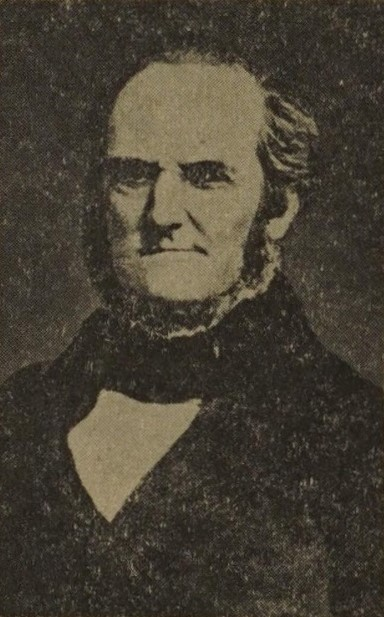
- Born: August 8, 1790; Flanders, New Jersey, U.S.
- Died: June 26, 1859 (aged 68); Philadelphia, Pennsylvania, U.S.
- Resting place: Laurel Hill Cemetery, Philadelphia, Pennsylvania, U.S.
- Spouse: Mary Vanuxem
- Children: 6

Charles Stewart Wurts (August 8, 1790 – June 26, 1859) was an American businessman who co-founded the Delaware and Hudson Canal Company with his three brothers to mine anthracite and transport it to New York.

== Biography ==
He was born in Flanders, New Jersey, on August 8, 1790, to John Wurts and Sarah Grandin.

As a youth, Wurts moved to Philadelphia, Pennsylvania, and worked at a commercial house. Before the War of 1812, he traveled to England to purchase goods for the business but returned to the United States before the end of the war. In 1819, he established a dry goods business in Philadelphia which became very successful. In 1823, he co-founded the Delaware and Hudson Canal Company with his brothers Maurice, William, and John Wurts. The company was founded to mine anthracite from Carbondale, Pennsylvania, and transport it to New York.

== Personal life ==
Charles married Mary Vanuxem on August 16, 1826, and together they had six children. He was active in the Presbyterian Church and a member of the American Sunday School Union.

He suffered from angina pectoris and died on June 26, 1859. He was interred at Laurel Hill Cemetery in Philadelphia.
