= Flanders, New Jersey =

Populated place in Morris County, New Jersey, US

- Census-designated place
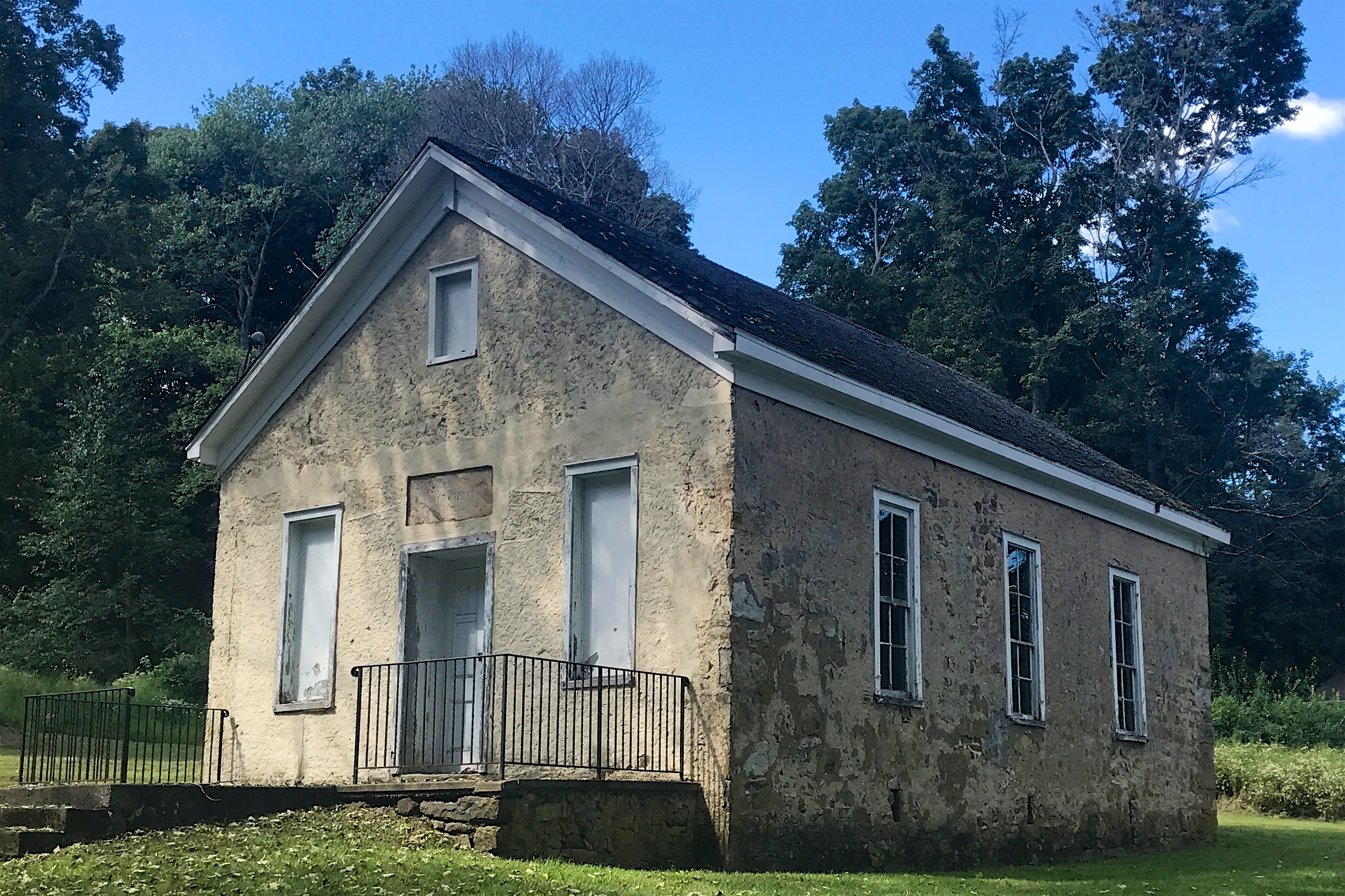
- Mount Olive Academy, built in 1837

- Location in Morris County Location in New Jersey Location in the United States
- Coordinates: 40°50′44″N 74°41′42″W
- Country: United States
- State: New Jersey
- County: Morris
- Township: Mount Olive

Area
  - Total: 7.45 sq mi (19.30 km^{2})
  - Land: 7.42 sq mi (19.23 km^{2})
  - Water: 0.027 sq mi (0.07 km^{2})
- Elevation: 679 ft (207 m)

Population (2020)
  - Total: 9,832
  - Density: 1,324.5/sq mi (511.4/km^{2})
- ZIP Code: 07836
- FIPS code: 34-23640
- GNIS feature ID: 0876369

Flanders is an unincorporated community and census-designated place (CDP) in Mount Olive Township, in southwestern Morris County, New Jersey, United States. As of the 2020 census, the population was 9,832. Flanders is served by the U.S. Postal Service as ZIP Code 07836.

== Geography ==
Flanders is in southeastern Mount Olive Township, bordered to the east by Ledgewood and Succasunna in Roxbury Township and to the south by Chester Township. U.S. Route 206 passes through the community to the west of its center, leading north 4 miles (6 km) to Netcong and south 5 miles (8 km) to Chester.

Flanders lies in the German Valley, between highlands that rise 400 feet (120 m) to the northwest and 200 feet (60 m) to the southeast. Drakes Brook, a southwest-flowing tributary of the South Branch of the Raritan River, passes through the center of town. According to the U.S. Census Bureau, the Flanders CDP has a total area of 7.45 square miles (19.30 km^{2}), of which 0.03 square miles (0.08 km^{2}), or 0.36%, are water.

== Demographics ==
Historical population
Census	Pop.	Note	%±
1990	10,528		—
2000	12,217		16.0%
2010	12,568		2.9%
2020	9,832		−21.8%
Population sources:1990 2000 2010 2020

Flanders first appeared as a census-designated place in the 2020 U.S. census.

=== 2020 census ===
As of the 2020 census, Flanders had a population of 9,832.

The median age was 40.2 years. 21.5% of residents were under the age of 18 and 14.2% of residents were 65 years of age or older. For every 100 females there were 97.1 males, and for every 100 females age 18 and over there were 97.4 males age 18 and over.

98.1% of residents lived in urban areas, while 1.9% lived in rural areas.

There were 3,792 households in Flanders, of which 32.1% had children under the age of 18 living in them. Of all households, 56.4% were married-couple households, 15.8% were households with a male householder and no spouse or partner present, and 21.1% were households with a female householder and no spouse or partner present. About 24.0% of all households were made up of individuals and 7.4% had someone living alone who was 65 years of age or older.

There were 3,967 housing units, of which 4.4% were vacant. The homeowner vacancy rate was 1.6% and the rental vacancy rate was 6.6%.

Flanders CDP, New Jersey – Racial and ethnic composition Note: the US Census treats Hispanic/Latino as an ethnic category. This table excludes Latinos from the racial categories and assigns them to a separate category. Hispanics/Latinos may be of any race.
Race / Ethnicity (NH = Non-Hispanic)	Pop 2020	2020
White alone (NH)	7,049	71.69%
Black or African American alone (NH)	462	4.70%
Native American or Alaska Native alone (NH)	4	0.04%
Asian alone (NH)	587	5.97%
Native Hawaiian or Pacific Islander alone (NH)	0	0.00%
Other race alone (NH)	39	0.40%
Mixed race or Multiracial (NH)	338	3.44%
Hispanic or Latino (any race)	1,353	13.76%
Total	9,832	100.00%

=== 2010 census ===
As of the 2010 census, the population of the Flanders ZIP Code Tabulation Area was 12,568. This represented an increase of 351 (+2.9%) from the 2000 census.

=== 2000 census ===
As of the 2000 census, the population was 12,217.

== Notable people ==
People who were born in, residents of, or otherwise closely associated with Flanders include:

- Kenny Agostino (born 1992), professional hockey player for the Montreal Canadiens
- Liam Anderson (born 2000), American football linebacker for the Indianapolis Colts of the National Football League
- Noah Brown (born 1996), wide receiver for the Dallas Cowboys
- Mariann Budde (born 1959), prelate of the Episcopal Church who has served as Bishop of Washington since November 2011
- John R. Neill (1877-1943), magazine and children's book illustrator primarily known for illustrating more than forty stories set in the Land of Oz
- Jonathan Nicholas (1757/59–1839), early settler of Flanders who served as a sergeant in the American Revolutionary War
- David W. K. Peacock Jr. (1924–2005), government official and businessman who served as a Deputy Undersecretary at the Department of Commerce during the Nixon Administration
- Lee Rouson (born 1962), former NFL running back for the New York Giants
- Steve Slattery (born 1980), Olympic track and field athlete
- Charles Stewart Wurts (1790-1859), founder of the Delaware and Hudson Canal Company
- John Wurts (1792-1861), member of the United States House of Representatives from Pennsylvania
