= List of stop motion artists =

This is a list of artists (animators, directors and producers) who have created stop-motion animation. Active years by approximation, mostly based on IMDb information and as much as possible concerning work in the field of animation. The original order of the list is based on the first year of activity.

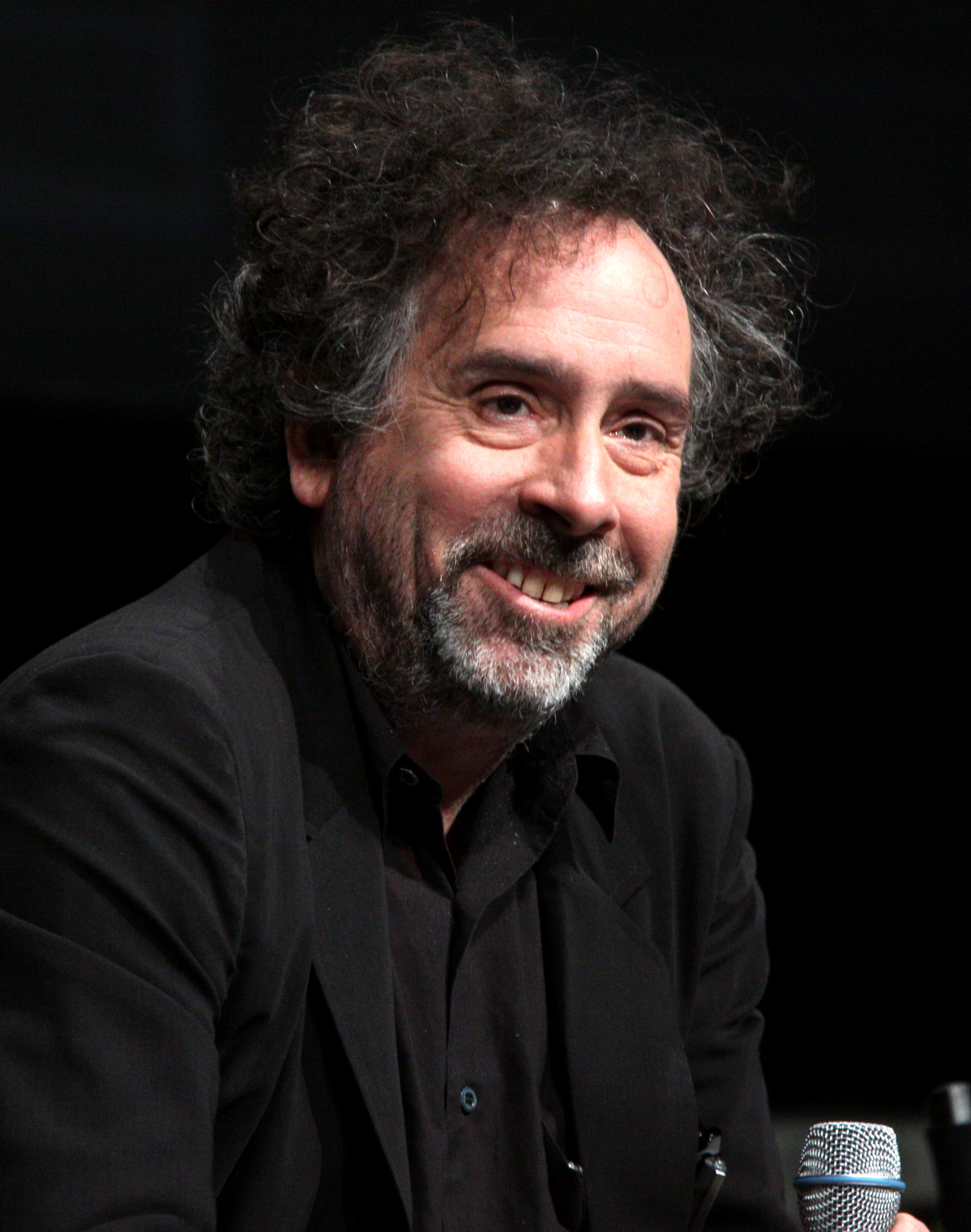
Tim Burton, famous for the award-winning The Nightmare Before Christmas (1993)

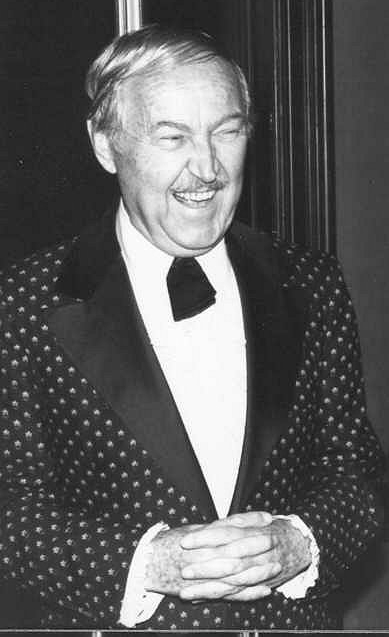
George Pal

name	birth-death	country	best known work	years active	main technique	note	
Ladyslaw Starewicz	1882-1965	Russian Empire, France	The Tale of the Fox (1930)	1910-1965	puppets	pioneer who started with dead beetles, later expressive puppets	
Willis H. O'Brien	1886-1962	United States	King Kong (1933)	1915-1962	models	pioneer of model animation	
Helena Smith Dayton	1883-1960	United States	Animated Sculpture (1917) Program of shorts including "Battle of the Suds"	1917	Clay animation	Her films are considered lost, but are very well documented in magazines and newspaper of the time.	
Oskar Fischinger	1900-1967	German Empire, United States	Komposition in Blau (1935)	1921-1935?	clay (wax)	influential experimental abstract animator, occasionally working with wax (but mostly with paint)	
Charles Bowers	1889-1946	United States	Pete Roleum and His Cousins (1939)	1925-1941		started as traditional animator before directing and acting in slapstick comedies with stop motion elements, also directed a few fully animated short films	
Hermína Týrlová	1900-1993	Bohemia, Czechoslovakia	"Fernando the Ant", "Revolt of the Toys"	1928-1986	puppets	"the mother of Czech animation" produced over 60 short films	
George Pal	1908-1980	Hungary, The Netherlands, United States	Puppetoons (1932-1971)	1932-1980	puppets (wood)	received honorary Academy Award for his innovative technique, later a live-action fantasy director occasionally using stop motion effects	
Lou Bunin	1904-1994	United States	Bury the Axis (1943)	1939-1951	models	pioneer of model animation	
Ray Harryhausen	1920-2013	United States, UK	Jason and the Argonauts (1963)	1942-2013	models	assisted George Pal and Willis O'Brien before he became the model animation specialist for many live-action adventure films	
Joop Geesink	1913-1984	The Netherlands	Loeki de Leeuw (1972-2004)	1942-1984	puppets	started as set designer, made many stop motion commercials and created Loekie de Leeuw as interstitial program between Dutch TV commercials	
Walerian Borowczyk	1923-2006	Poland, France	Renaissance (1963)	1946-1988	objects	multi award-winning and influential surrealistic stop motion animator	
Jiří Trnka	1912-1969	Czechoslovakia	The Czech Year (1947)	1947-1965	puppets	multi award-winning puppet animator	
Břetislav Pojar	1923-2012	Czechoslovakia, Canada	To See or Not to See (1969)	1949-2011	puppets	multi award-winning puppet animator, started animating for Jiří Trnka, later made shorts for National Film Board of Canada	
Ivo Caprino	1925-2010	Norway	Flåklypa Grand Prix (1975)	1949-1975	puppets	went on to create attractions for a theme park after his most successful film	
Tadahito Mochinaga	1919-1999	Japan	Rudolph the Red-Nosed Reindeer (TV special) (1964)	1950-1979	puppets	created popular "Animagic" productions for Rankin/Bass from 1960-1967	
Art Clokey	1921-2010	United States	The Gumby Show (1957)	1955-2010	clay		
Jan Lenica	1928-2001	Poland, France, Germany	Ubu et la grande gidouille (1964)	1957-2001	cut-outs	graphic artist and animation professor, collaborated with Walerian Borowczyk	
Bill Justice	1914-2011	United States	Noah's Ark (1959)	1959	puppets	animation director for Disney, responsible for Disney's first stop motion film (nominated for Academy Award)	
Otmar Gutmann	1937-1993	Switzerland, Germany	Pingu (1990)	1986-1993	clay	German animator, creator of Pingu	
Jim Danforth	1940	United States	Willy Wonka & the Chocolate Factory (1971)	1959-1993	models	worked for Art Clokey, George Pal, Ray Harryhausen and others	
Jean-Michel Kibushi Ndjate Wooto	1957	Republic of the Congo	Muana Mboka (1999)	1957–present	objects	pioneer of African animation	
Jan Švankmajer	1934	Czechoslovakia	Meat Love (1989)	1964–present	objects	influential surrealistic stop motion animator working with various materials and objects	
Kihachirō Kawamoto	1925-2010	Japan	Shisha no sho (The Book of the Dead) (2005)	1968-2005	puppets	puppet designer and animator, independent director, trained under Tadahito Mochinaga and Jiří Trnka	
Jackie Cockle	1950	UK	Timmy Time (2009-2012)	1976–present		animator, creator of Timmy Time, creative producer for Bob the Builder	
Mike Jittlov	1948	United States	The Wizard of Speed and Time (1979, 1989)	1977–present	mixed	independent special effects animator, created short stop motion films for Disney	
Phil Tippett	1951	United States	The Empire Strikes Back (1982)	1977–present	models	developer of go motion, creature animator for the original Star Wars trilogy	
Peter Lord	1953	UK	Morph (character) (1977–present)	1977–present	clay	co-founder of Aardman Animation	
David Sproxton	1954	UK	Morph (character) (1977–present)	1977–present	clay	co-founder of Aardman Animation	
Jiří Barta	1948	Czechoslovakia	The Pied Piper (1986)	1978–present	puppets	multi award-winning puppet animator, started at Jiří Trnka's studio	
Brothers Quay	1947 (twins)	United States	Street of Crocodiles (1986)	1979–present	puppets	multi award-winning and influential stop motion animators	
Richard Starzak	1959	UK	Rex the Runt (1991-2001); Shaun the Sheep (2007-present)	1983-present	clay		
Tim Burton	1958	United States	Corpse Bride (2005)	1982–present	puppets	director/producer occasionally working with stop motion	
Dave Borthwick	1947-2012	UK	The Secret Adventures of Tom Thumb (1993)	1984-1993	mixed	co-founder of bolexbrothers, later directed CG animation	
Nick Park	1958	UK	Wallace and Gromit (1989–present)	1985–present	clay	creator of many popular clay animation films and series	
Henry Selick	1952	United States	The Nightmare Before Christmas (1993)	1991–present	puppets	director of several popular animated features with puppets	
PES	1973	United States	Fresh Guacamole (2012)	2001–present	objects	Known for his “substituted objects” style; creator of the shortest film ever nominated for an Oscar, and most-viewed Oscar short in history	
Adam Shaheen	1964	UK, Canada	Life's a Zoo (2008-2009)	1992-2017		founder of stop motion studio Cuppa Coffee Animation	
Adam Jones	1965	United States	Sober (1992)	1992–present	puppets	guitarist for Tool, responsible for their stop motion music videos	
Corky Quakenbush		United States	MADtv (1995-1997)	1995–present			
Eric Fogel	1969	United States	Celebrity Deathmatch (1998-2002)	1997–present	clay	animator director occasionally working with claymation	
Q. Allan Brocka	1972	Guam, United States	Rick & Steve (1999, 2007-2009)	1999–present	puppets		
Suzie Templeton	1967	UK	Peter and the Wolf (2006)	2000–present		won Academy Award for Best Animated Short Film in 2008	
Jim Jinkins	1953	United States	JoJo's Circus (2003-2007)	2003–present	puppets	animation director (best known for Doug), occasionally working with stop motion	
Shubhavi Arya	1998	India	Adventures of Malia (2015)	2015–present	cutout	multi award winning animation director, aged 16 when she completed her first award-winning animation	
Katherine Taylor	2000	United States	The Peace of Wild Things (2022)	2019-present	puppets, paper cutouts, fabrication, clay	Fine Artist with focus in Animation and Textiles	
Eric Leiser	1982	United States	Imagination_(film) (2007)	2007-present	puppets	animation director and animator (best known for Imagination (2007)	Stop-motion

== See also ==
- Still motion
- List of stop motion films
