= Food (disambiguation) =

Food is a substance that can be consumed by organisms, especially by eating, in order to sustain life. It generally provides nutrition and acts as a fuel for the working of a body.

Food may also refer to:

== Films ==
- Food (film) (1992), animated short film by Jan Švankmajer
- Food, Inc. (2009), documentary

== Music ==
- Food (band), a jazz band initiated by Ian Bellamy and Thomas Strønen
- F.O.O.D. (album), (2005), by Danny!
- Food (Kelis album) (2014)
- Food (Zico Chain album) (2007)
- The Food Album (1993), by "Weird Al" Yankovic
- "The Food" (2004), a song by Common
- Food Records, a British record label
- Mm..Food, a 2004 album by MF Doom

== Other uses ==
- FOOD, 1970s artist-run restaurant in SoHo, New York
- "Food", the 2nd episode of the Adult Swim television series, Off the Air
- "Food", a Series F episode of the television series QI (2009)
- Foods (journal)
- Foodstuffs (company), a New Zealand company
- Food Not Bombs, group of independent collectives, sharing free, usually vegan and vegetarian food with others
