= 1904 in animation =

Events in 1904 in animation.

== Films released ==
- September - The Enchanted Toymaker (United Kingdom), combined live-action and stop-motion animation.

== Births ==
=== January ===
- January 1: Grace Bailey, American animator (head of the ink and paint department at Walt Disney Animation Studios), (d. 1983).
- January 31: Cliff Nazarro, American actor (voice of Eddie Cackler in Slap-Happy Pappy), (d. 1961).

=== February ===
- February 11: José do Patrocínio Oliveira, Brazilian singer, musician and actor (voice of José Carioca in Saludos Amigos and The Three Caballeros), (d. 1987).
- February 16: James Baskett, American actor (voice of the obese crow in Dumbo, portrayed Uncle Remus and voiced Br'er Fox in Song of the South), (d. 1948).

=== March ===
- March 2: Dr. Seuss, American children's novelist, illustrator, animator and comics artist (Warner Bros. Cartoons, How the Grinch Stole Christmas!), (d. 1991).
- March 15: J. Pat O'Malley, British actor and singer (voice of Cyril Proudbottom and Winkie in The Adventures of Ichabod and Mr. Toad, Mother Oyster, The Walrus and the Carpenter and Tweedledum and Tweedledee in Alice in Wonderland, Jasper and the Colonel in 101 Dalmatians, the Cockney coster in Mary Poppins, and Colonel Hathi in The Jungle Book), (d. 1985).
- March 28: Lou Bunin, American puppeteer and animator (Alice in Wonderland, Bury the Axis), (d. 1994).

=== April ===
- April 4: John Brown, British actor (voice of Umpire in Make Mine Music, Noah Webster in Symphony in Slang, the narrator, Pee Wee and the theatrical agent in Dixieland Droopy), (d. 1957).
- April 5: Hicks Lokey, American animator (Fleischer Studios, Walter Lantz, Walt Disney Studios, Hanna-Barbera), (d. 1990).

=== May ===
- May 1: Fred Spencer, American animator and comics artist (Walt Disney Animation Studios, developed the character of Donald Duck), (d. 1938).
- May 3: William L. Hendricks, American producer (Looney Tunes), (d. 1992).
- May 18: Art Landy, American animator, specialized in animation set decoration (Walt Disney Animation Studios, Walter Lantz Studio), (d. 1977).
- May 29: Don Brodie, American actor and director (voice of Devil Donald in Donald's Better Self, and Barker in Pinocchio), (d. 2001).
- May 30: Manny Gould, American animator (Barré Studio, Paramount Studios, Columbia Pictures, Warner Bros. Cartoons, Ed Graham Productions, DePatie-Freleng Enterprises, Ralph Bakshi), (d. 1975).

=== June ===
- June 12: Johnny Murray, American actor (voice of Bosko from 1930 to 1933), (d. 1956).
- June 16: Pete Burness, American animator and animation director (Romer Grey, Van Beuren Studios, Warner Bros. Cartoons, MGM, UPA, Jay Ward Productions), (d. 1969).
- June 18: Keye Luke, Chinese actor (voice of Brak in Space Ghost, Charlie Chan in The Amazing Chan and the Chan Clan, Zoltar and The Great Spirit in Battle of the Planets), (d. 1991).
- June 24: Phil Harris, American comedian, actor and jazz singer (voice of Baloo in The Jungle Book, Thomas O'Malley in The Aristocats, Little John in Robin Hood, Patou in Rock-a-Doodle), (d. 1995).

=== July ===
- July 23: Roland Davies, English comics artist, animator, animation producer and painter (Roland Davies Films Ltd., animated cartoons based on Come On, Steve), (d. 1993).

=== August ===
- August 4:
  - Helen Kane, American actress and singer (primary inspiration for the character of Betty Boop), (d. 1966).
  - Reg Parlett, English cartoonist and comic-book artist, (writer and artist for J. Arthur Rank's Animaland cartoons, one of the artists working on the animated film Animal Farm). (d. 1991)

=== September ===
- September 4: Irv Wyner, American background artist and animator (Warner Bros. Cartoons, Walt Disney Company, Walter Lantz, Chuck Jones), (d. 2002).
- September 15: Tom Conway, British actor (narrator in Peter Pan, voice of Collie and Quizmaster in One Hundred and One Dalmatians), (d. 1967).
- September 17: Jerry Colonna, American comedian, singer and musician and actor (narrator of the Casey at the Bat segment in Make Mine Music and the short The Brave Engineer, voice of the March Hare in Alice in Wonderland), (d. 1986).
- September 19: Elvia Allman, American actress (voice of Miss Cud in I Haven't Got a Hat, second voice of Clarabelle Cow), (d. 1992).

=== October ===
- October 24: Warren Foster, American screenwriter, animator and composer (Fleischer Studios, Warner Bros Cartoons, Hanna-Barbera), (d. 1971).
- October 25: Bill Tytla, Ukrainian-American animator (Walt Disney Animation Studios, Terrytoons, Famous Studios), (d. 1968).

=== December ===
- December 7: Clarence Nash, American voice actor (voice of Donald Duck), (d. 1985).
