= Budd Lake, New Jersey =

Populated place in Morris County, New Jersey, US

- Census-designated place
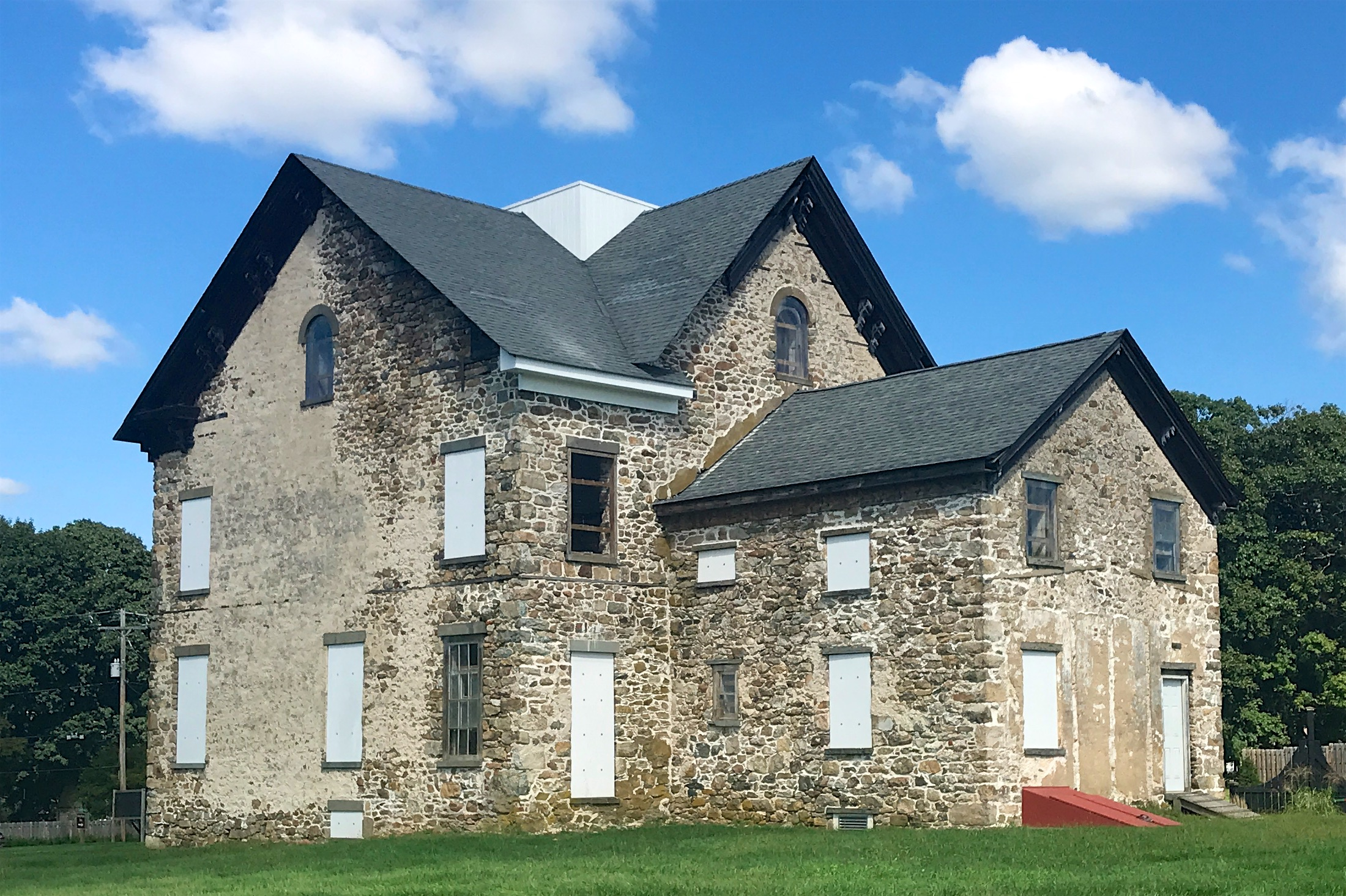
- Seward Mansion

- Location in Morris County and the state of New Jersey.

- Location in Morris County Location in New Jersey Location in the United States
- Coordinates: 40.873494°N 74.736828°W
- Country: United States
- State: New Jersey
- County: Morris
- Township: Mount Olive
- Named after: John Budd

Area
  - Total: 6.42 sq mi (16.64 km^{2})
  - Land: 5.44 sq mi (14.10 km^{2})
  - Water: 0.98 sq mi (2.54 km^{2}) 15.27%
- Elevation: 928 ft (283 m)

Population (2020)
  - Total: 9,784
  - Density: 1,797.2/sq mi (693.9/km^{2})
- Time zone: UTC−05:00 (Eastern (EST))
  - Summer (DST): UTC−04:00 (Eastern (EDT))
- ZIP Code: 07828
- Area codes: 862/973
- FIPS code: 3408620
- GNIS feature ID: 2389258

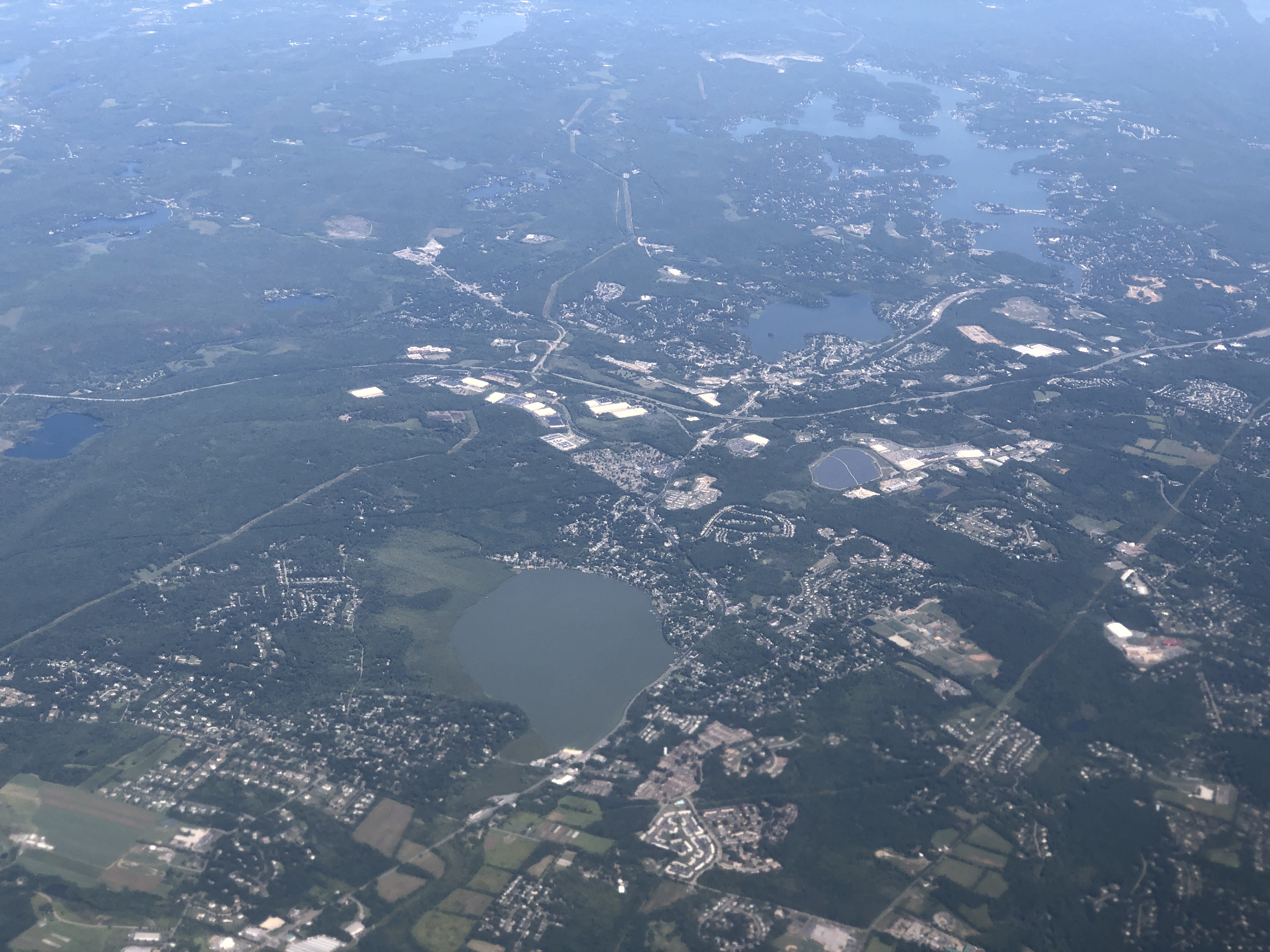
Aerial view of Budd Lake, with the namesake glacial lake near the bottom. Lake Hopatcong and Lake Musconetcong are at the upper right.

Budd Lake is an unincorporated community and census-designated place (CDP) located within Mount Olive Township, in Morris County, in the U.S. state of New Jersey. As of the 2020 United States census, the CDP's population was 9,784, its highest decennial census count ever and an increase of 816 (+9.1%) from the 8,968 enumerated at the 2010 census, which in turn reflected an increase of 868 (+10.7%) from the 8,100 counted in the 2000 census. Budd Lake was named for John Budd. Prior to that, it was called Hattacawanna Lake.

== Geography ==
Budd Lake is in western Morris County, in central Mount Olive Township. U.S. Route 46 passes through the community, leading northeast 3 miles (5 km) to Netcong and southwest 5 miles (8 km) to Hackettstown. Interstate 80 passes just north of the community. New York City is 46 miles (74 km) to the east via I-80, and the Delaware Water Gap is 25 miles (40 km) to the west.

According to the U.S. Census Bureau, the Budd Lake CDP has a total area of 6.424 square miles (16.64 km^{2}), including 5.444 square miles (14.10 km^{2}) of land and 0.980 square miles (2.54 km^{2}) of water (15.26%).

=== Budd Lake ===
Budd Lake, which the community is named after, is the source of the South Branch Raritan River. A glacial lake at an elevation of 933 feet (284 m), Budd Lake has a surface area of 374 acres (1.51 km^{2}). It is 7 to 12 feet (2.1 to 3.7 m) deep and can have large algal blooms. The adjacent bog, created by thousands of years of decaying plant material, supports wetland plants such as black spruce and tamarack, which grow on the floating mass. The lake is recharged through groundwater seepage through a series of wetlands, and serves as the headwaters of the Raritan River's South Branch. It is closely bordered by U.S. Route 46 to the south and Sand Shore Road to the east.

Budd Lake was named for John Budd, who acquired 1,300 acres (530 ha) of land in the area in 1714. Prior to that, it was called Hattacawanna Lake.

== Demographics ==
Historical population
Census	Pop.	Note	%±
1950	1,032		—
1960	1,520		47.3%
1970	3,168		108.4%
1980	6,523		105.9%
1990	7,272		11.5%
2000	8,100		11.4%
2010	8,968		10.7%
2020	9,784		9.1%
Population sources: 1950 1960 1970; 1980 1990 2000; 2010 2020

Budd Lake first appeared as an unincorporated community in the 1950 U.S. census; and then as a census designated place in the 1980 U.S. census.

=== Racial and ethnic composition ===
Budd Lake CDP, New Jersey – Racial and ethnic composition Note: the US Census treats Hispanic/Latino as an ethnic category. This table excludes Latinos from the racial categories and assigns them to a separate category. Hispanics/Latinos may be of any race.
Race / Ethnicity (NH = Non-Hispanic)	Pop 2000	Pop 2010	Pop 2020	% 2000	% 2010	% 2020
White alone (NH)	6,680	6,405	5,944	82.47%	71.42%	60.75%
Black or African American alone (NH)	279	537	553	3.44%	5.99%	5.65%
Native American or Alaska Native alone (NH)	5	9	3	0.06%	0.10%	0.03%
Asian alone (NH)	467	690	1,132	5.77%	7.69%	11.57%
Native Hawaiian or Pacific Islander alone (NH)	0	5	3	0.00%	0.06%	0.03%
Other race alone (NH)	20	8	49	0.25%	0.09%	0.50%
Mixed race or Multiracial (NH)	113	141	391	1.40%	1.57%	4.00%
Hispanic or Latino (any race)	536	1,173	1,709	6.62%	13.08%	17.47%
Total	8,100	8,968	9,784	100.00%	100.00%	100.00%

=== 2020 census ===
As of the 2020 census, Budd Lake had a population of 9,784. The median age was 39.0 years. 24.3% of residents were under the age of 18 and 12.2% of residents were 65 years of age or older. For every 100 females there were 99.8 males, and for every 100 females age 18 and over there were 97.1 males age 18 and over.

97.1% of residents lived in urban areas, while 2.9% lived in rural areas.

There were 3,445 households in Budd Lake, of which 38.2% had children under the age of 18 living in them. Of all households, 58.3% were married-couple households, 15.8% were households with a male householder and no spouse or partner present, and 19.6% were households with a female householder and no spouse or partner present. About 19.8% of all households were made up of individuals and 6.1% had someone living alone who was 65 years of age or older.

There were 3,571 housing units, of which 3.5% were vacant. The homeowner vacancy rate was 1.5% and the rental vacancy rate was 4.8%.

=== 2010 census ===
The 2010 United States census counted 8,968 people, 3,232 households, and 2,385 families in the CDP. The population density was 1,647.5 people per square mile (636.1 people/km^{2}). There were 3,423 housing units at an average density of 628.8 units per square mile (242.8 units/km^{2}). The racial makeup was 80.88% (7,253) White, 6.39% (573) Black or African American, 0.16% (14) Native American, 7.71% (691) Asian, 0.09% (8) Pacific Islander, 2.39% (214) from other races, and 2.40% (215) from two or more races. Hispanic or Latino of any race were 13.08% (1,173) of the population.

Of the 3,232 households, 39.6% had children under the age of 18; 59.0% were married couples living together; 10.2% had a female householder with no husband present and 26.2% were non-families. Of all households, 20.9% were made up of individuals and 4.9% had someone living alone who was 65 years of age or older. The average household size was 2.77 and the average family size was 3.24.

26.4% of the population were under the age of 18, 8.1% from 18 to 24, 29.1% from 25 to 44, 28.7% from 45 to 64, and 7.7% who were 65 years of age or older. The median age was 37.6 years. For every 100 females, the population had 100.6 males. For every 100 females ages 18 and older there were 95.0 males.

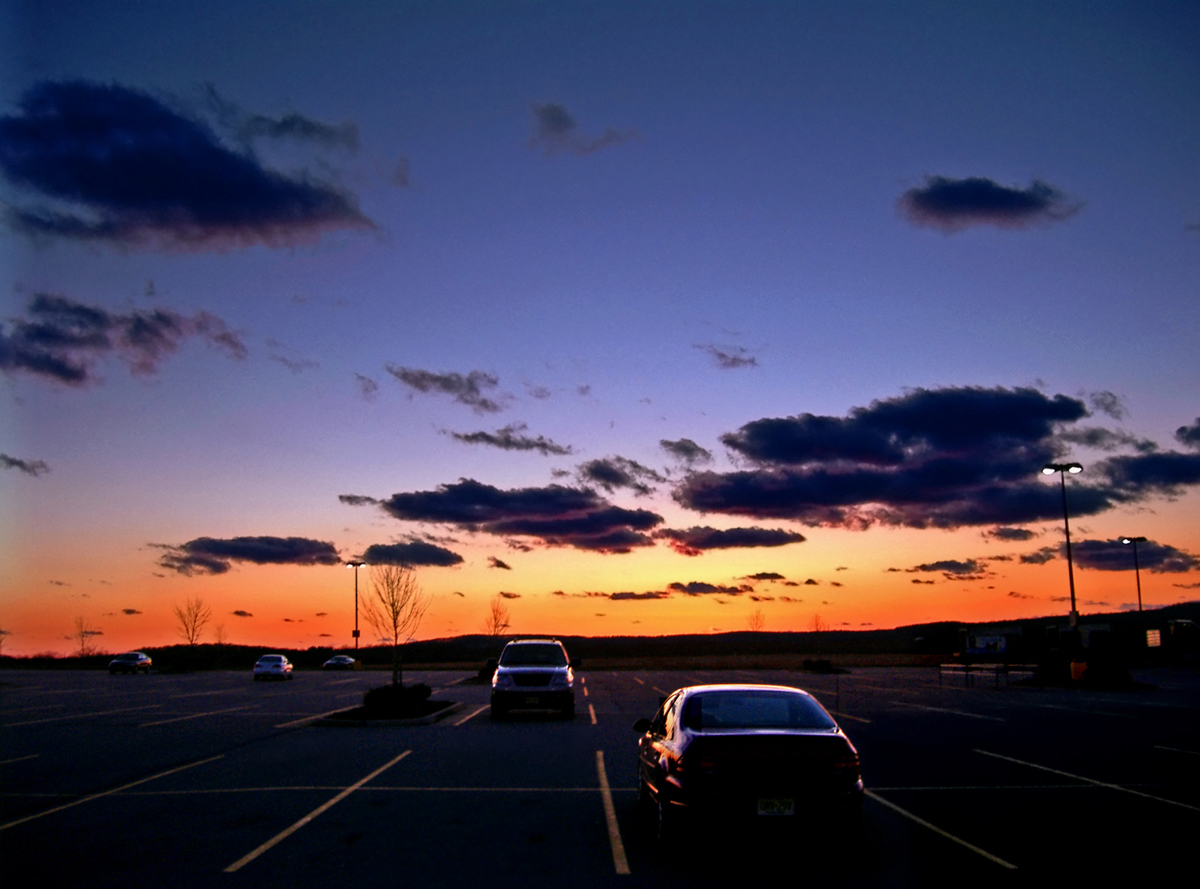
Budd Lake parking lot at dusk

=== 2000 census ===
As of the 2000 United States census there were 8,100 people, 2,851 households, and 2,169 families living in the CDP. The population density was 534.6 people/km^{2} (1,385 people/mi^{2}). There were 2,994 housing units at an average density of 197.6 units/km^{2} (512 units/mi^{2}). The racial makeup of the CDP was 87.11% White, 3.54% African American, 0.07% Native American, 5.80% Asian, 1.47% from other races, and 2.00% from two or more races. Hispanic or Latino of any race were 6.62% of the population.

There were 2,851 households, out of which 43.7% had children under the age of 18 living with them, 62.7% were married couples living together, 9.4% had a female householder with no husband present, and 23.9% were non-families. 18.4% of all households were made up of individuals, and 3.9% had someone living alone who was 65 years of age or older. The average household size was 2.83 and the average family size was 3.25.

In the CDP the population was spread out, with 28.7% under the age of 18, 6.9% from 18 to 24, 37.5% from 25 to 44, 21.2% from 45 to 64, and 5.8% who were 65 years of age or older. The median age was 34 years. For every 100 females, there were 99.0 males. For every 100 females age 18 and over, there were 96.5 males.

The median income for a household in the CDP was $62,540, and the median income for a family was $70,585. Males had a median income of $44,631 versus $35,316 for females. The per capita income for the CDP was $24,581. About 1.9% of families and 3.3% of the population were below the poverty line, including 2.4% of those under age 18 and 3.9% of those age 65 or over.

== Transportation ==
NJ Transit offers local bus service on the MCM5 route.

== Notable people ==
People who were born in, residents of, or otherwise closely associated with Budd Lake include:

- Tim Jacobus (born 1959), artist best known for illustrating the covers for nearly one hundred books in R. L. Stine's Goosebumps series
- PES (born 1973 as Adam Pesapane), Oscar and Emmy-nominated director and stop-motion animator, whose short film Fresh Guacamole was nominated for the Academy Award for Best Animated Short Film in 2013
- Ryan Peterson (born 1995), professional footballer who plays for the Charlotte Independence in USL League One
- Jen Ponton (born 1984), actress, screenwriter and producer, best known for portraying Rubi in the AMC series Dietland

== See also ==
- Pax Amicus Theatre
