= Toonloop =

Stop-motion animation software

Toonloop Live animation editor
- Original author: Alexandre Quessy
- Developers: Alexandre Quessy, Tristan Matthews, Vasilis Liaskovitis
- Initial release: April 11, 2008; 18 years ago
- Stable release: 2.2.2 / March 19, 2013; 13 years ago
- Written in: C++ (GTK+)
- Operating system: Unix-like
- Size: 0.2 megabytes
- Available in: English
- Type: Animation software
- License: GNU General Public License
- Website: toonloop.com

Toonloop is a software application for live stop-motion animation. "Live" means that the animation is constantly playing while being edited. Toonloop allows animators to create stop-motion animation, pixilation, and other animation techniques and the result is constantly seen while the user is adding images to the animation. It is a project of Alexandre Quessy with help from Tristan Matthews.

Alexandre Quessy presented artistic performances using this software at SAT and ETS in Canada and at the Piksel 09 Festival in Norway.

Toonloop is free and open-source software subject to the terms of the GNU General Public License (GPL). It is programmed in C++ and GTK+ as well as GStreamer. It has a Debian package. Toonloop was mentioned briefly at the 2009 Open Video Conference.

Toonloop has also been the topic of blogs.

== Features ==
Toonloop can be used to create time-lapse animations.
