= Behind the Beats, Vol. 1 =

Behind The Beats, Vol. 1

Compilation album by Danny!
- Released: September 11, 2007 (Japan)
- Recorded: 2004 – 2007
- Genre: Hip hop
- Length: 25:23
- Label: Badenov Records/1911 Music
- Producer: Danny!

Danny! chronology
21st Century Masters: The Millennium Collection: The Best of Danny! (2007)	Behind The Beats, Vol. 1 (2007)	Behind The Beats, Vol. 2 (2007)

Professional ratings
Review scores
Source	Rating
Allmusic	(not yet rated) link

Behind The Beats, Vol. 1 is the eighth independent release by American producer/rapper Danny!. It is a promotional disc consisting of snippets from twenty self-produced songs from his own discography, directly followed by a snippet from its original musical source. Behind The Beats, Vol. 1 was compiled and mixed by Danny himself, with a format akin to that of fellow producer Ski Beatz's own 2007 compilation disc entitled Beatz, Rhymes & Samples.

The album was released in extremely limited quantities on September 11, 2007 (see 2007 in music) via Danny's 1911 Music/Badenov Records imprint.

== Track listing ==
1. "Charm"
2. "Fullaschidt"
3. "The World Is Yours"
4. "I Need A Publicist"
5. "Duck Soup"
6. "F.O.O.D. Intro"
7. "Press Conference"
8. "Clap Back"
9. "The Last Laugh"
10. "The Lesson"
11. "Carousel"
12. "Café Surreàl, Pt. 2"
13. "D.A.N.N.Y."
14. "So All Alone"
15. "Where Were You"
16. "Check It Out"
17. "My Baby"
18. "Charm Intro"
19. "We Gonna Make It"
20. "Fly"
