= Animato (film) =

1977 film by Mike Jittlov

Animato is a compilation of short films by Mike Jittlov, making extensive use of stop motion, pixilation, kinestasis, animation, and multiple exposures.

== Summary ==
It features the films The Interview, Swing Shift, Rocketman, The Leap, Time Tripper and Fashionation.

== Reception ==
It was screened at Filmex in 1977. Regis Philbin was so impressed by the short Time Tripper that he had it televised.

Fashionation is one of the well-known animated segments. The short was made using kinestasis and cutout animation, mostly from fashion magazines illustrating the lyrics of the song "I Know a Place" by Petula Clark. It also extensively used multiple exposures, pixilation and stop motion for the brief live-action sequence.

== See also ==
- The Wizard of Speed and Time
- Mike Jittlov
- 1977 in film
