= Western Spaghetti =

2008 animated short film by PES

- Promotional poster
- Directed by: PES
- Written by: PES
- Produced by: PES
- Starring: PES (hands)
- Release date: April 25, 2008
- Running time: 1 minute 40 seconds
- Country: United States

Western Spaghetti is a 2008 American animated short film written and directed by PES. It is credited with originating the stop-motion cooking film genre, depicting the preparation of a spaghetti dish using substituted everyday objects in place of real ingredients. The film marked the first in a series of cooking films by PES that includes the Academy Award–nominated Fresh Guacamole (2012) and Submarine Sandwich (2014).

== Concept ==
The film features an unseen chef preparing a dish of spaghetti (the hands in the film are PES’s), with all ingredients replaced by everyday objects substituted for their edible counterparts. The objects are manipulated and transformed through stop-motion animation and pixilation.

The selection of objects is central to the film’s visual appeal, with some chosen for close visual resemblance (such as tomato pin cushions for tomatoes), while others rely on more abstract associations (such as a Rubik's Cube for a head of garlic), and still others for word play (googly eyes for “see salt” and foil for “oil”). As one commentator noted, “The film’s humor and pleasure comes from the unexpected, yet somehow fitting, choices that PES makes for the objects.”

PES had used this object-substitution technique in earlier films, including Roof Sex (2001), KaBoom! (2004), and Game Over (2006). In discussing the concept for Western Spaghetti, PES stated: “In many of my films I use foods as other things (e.g. popcorn as explosions or peanuts as crying babies). I thought it would be interesting to flip this and make a film where everyday objects stand in for the food, such as rubber bands for spaghetti, Post-it notes for butter, and bubble wrap for boiling water.”

== Release ==
Western Spaghetti premiered at the Alamo Drafthouse in Austin, Texas, on April 25, 2008, as part of The Animation Show. Funding for the film was provided by Mike Judge, whose name appears in the original credits as a “Special Thanks.” Following a two-month theatrical window, Western Spaghetti was released on PES’s YouTube channel on July 5, 2008.

== Reception ==
The film became widely viewed online after its release. TIME Magazine named Western Spaghetti the #2 Internet film of 2008 in its "Top Ten of Everything 2008". The film also won an Honorable Mention at the 2009 Sundance Film Festival and the Audience Award at the Annecy International Animation Film Festival in June 2009.

== Legacy ==
Western Spaghetti is regarded as the earliest example of the “object-substitution” cooking format that later pervaded advertising, online video, and social media. These works typically replace real food with inedible objects while imitating the visual language and structure of filmed cooking and food preparation. PES’s use of synchronized sound effects to make the objects appear tactile and appetizing has been identified as a characteristic element of the format. Western Spaghetti has been cited as an early example of “unintentional” ASMR due to its emphasis on texture, sound, and tactile satisfaction.

Following the popularity of Western Spaghetti (2008) and PES’s later short Fresh Guacamole (2012), advertising campaigns employing similar object-substitution cooking techniques appeared internationally for Chex (United States), OXO (United Kingdom), IKEA (Malaysia), The Laughing Cow (South Korea), Canal+ (France), BankBazaar (India), Bezeq (Israel), LEGO (Denmark), and the Scottish Government.

During the 2010s, the format also gave rise to a sustained community of online creators producing stop-motion cooking videos for YouTube and social media, including channels devoted almost entirely to object-substitution cooking animations.

Subsequent iterations of the format included stop-motion cooking videos constructed entirely from single “substituted” materials, particularly LEGO bricks — a popular subgenre often referred to as “LEGO cooking” — as well as paper and felted wool.

By the mid-2020s, AI-generated videos centered on the slicing and transformation of everyday objects, including “glass fruit cutting” videos, became popular across social media platforms. Western Spaghetti has also been referenced in discussions of internet trends focused on visual reveal and deceptive transformation imagery, including the “Is It Cake?” meme, in which seemingly inedible objects are revealed upon slicing to be made of cake.

In 2021, Cartoon Brew ranked Western Spaghetti No. 3 on its list of the “Top 50 Most-Viewed Indie Animated Shorts on YouTube,” with PES's Fresh Guacamole ranked No. 1. Still frames from the film appear on the cover of the first edition of Frame-By-Frame Stop Motion: The Guide to Non-Traditional Animation Techniques by Tom Gasek.
