= Mickey's 60th Birthday =

1988 TV special for Mickey Mouse

- Print advertisement
- Written by: Joie Albrecht; Scott Garen
- Directed by: Scott Garen
- Starring: John Ritter; Jill Eikenberry; Carl Reiner; Cheech Marin; Phylicia Rashad; Charles Fleischer
- Voices of: Wayne Allwine; Tony Anselmo; Peter Cullen
- Theme music composer: Christopher L. Stone
- Country of origin: United States
- Original language: English

Production
- Production companies: Walt Disney Television; Murakami-Wolf-Swenson; Garen/Albrecht Productions Inc.

Original release
- Network: NBC
- Release: November 13, 1988

Related
- Donald Duck's 50th Birthday

Mickey's 60th Birthday is an American live-action/animated television special broadcast on The Magical World of Disney on November 13, 1988 on NBC. As the title suggests, it was produced for the 60th anniversary of the Mickey Mouse character. Like Who Framed Roger Rabbit (which had been recently released at the time), much of the footage featured in the film is live-action with newly made animation (although some of the animation used for some scenes was made from existing footage) provided by Murakami-Wolf-Swenson. It was rebroadcast on Disney Channel Europe on November 18, 2008, to celebrate the 20th anniversary of the special, as well as Mickey's 80th birthday.

As an NBC spectacular, the special features the cast of several contemporary NBC television shows, including Family Ties, Cheers, Hunter, L.A. Law and The Cosby Show.

== Plot ==
Mickey Mouse's 60th Birthday special is being taped and as his appearance in the show draws to a close, Mickey finds himself trying to decide how he should present himself to his audience. Rummaging through an old trunk, he finds the magic hat from The Sorcerer's Apprentice segment of Fantasia and considers using it, but he is warned by a sorcerer who owns the hat (who is not Yen Sid) that he should not be using other people's magic when he has his own, which Mickey initially does not understand. With that in mind, Mickey goes out on stage along with his birthday cake, provided by Roger Rabbit, who realizes that he placed a stick of dynamite on the cake instead of a candle. In his attempt to put the dynamite out, Roger ends up destroying the set, which prompts Mickey to use the magic from the hat to repair the damage. The audience screams for more and Mickey agrees to do so, but when he does, he suddenly vanishes.

The sorcerer, annoyed that Mickey disobeyed his warning and also seeing that he did not understand what he meant, decides to teach the Mouse how to find his own kind of magic, by casting a spell on him in which anyone he runs into fails to recognize him as Mickey Mouse; the spell can only be broken once Mickey finds his own magic. The Mouse is then returned to the real world, where he is found by Andy Keaton of Family Ties, who mistakenly believes him to be a good impression of the real thing. Andy shows Mickey off to Mallory and Jennifer, but when they are not convinced, and even Andy turns him down, to Mickey's dismay. He later goes to the bar from Cheers, only to realize he has no money to buy himself a drink. He then sings the "Happy Birthday" song to Rebecca Howe, cheering her up so much that she takes him out to dinner and a movie.

Meanwhile, The Walt Disney Company has organized a search party, led by Sergeant Rick Hunter (from Hunter) to find the missing Mickey, which was reported on a local news show. In the process, anchorpersons Dudley Goode and Mia Loud begin to suspect Donald Duck after being told of how upset he was that he was not going to appear in Mickey's special. Their suspicions go even further when they find old footage in Donald's trash of Donald doing his own version of The Mickey Mouse Club theme song, and Donald is soon arrested after he tries (unsuccessfully) to testify his innocence (he claimed that the kidnapper was either Minnie Mouse, "the guy who framed Roger Rabbit", the Wicked Witch or Porky Pig). Donald is to be represented by the legal firm of McKenzie, Brackman, Chaney and Kuzak. As they continue with their reports on the search, the reporters show various clip montages of Mickey and various tributes.

As the special nears its end, Mickey returns to Disneyland, where a custodian mopes over the fact that he cannot see any point in his profession if the guest of honor is not going to show up for his own birthday party. A fellow custodian then sings a song called "It's Magic" to cheer him up, with Mickey accompanying the ensuing song-and-dance number. At this point, the sorcerer reappears and congratulates Mickey now that he has finally found his own magic inside him and thus breaks the spell. Just as the sorcerer exits, Roger rushes up to Mickey and instantly recognizes him. The news of Roger having "found" Mickey is brought to the news and the innocent Donald is released from jail just in time to join Mickey's birthday celebration. Soon, a parade appears, taking Mickey to Sleeping Beauty Castle, where Minnie is. People in the parade throw him up to the balcony of Sleeping Beauty Castle where Minnie is standing. Finally, Mickey and Minnie are reunited.

Also making cameo appearances are several reporters for NBC stations, including Allison Rosati of WGRZ-TV and Sue Simmons of WNBC-TV.

== Cast ==
- Carl Reiner as Mel Fellini
- Charles Fleischer as Charlie the Stage Manager and the voice of Roger Rabbit
- John Ritter as Dudley Goode
- Jill Eikenberry as Mia Loud
- Michael Eisner as Himself
- Brian Bonsall as Andy Keaton
- Justine Bateman as Mallory Keaton
- Michael J. Fox as Alex P. Keaton
  (flashback clip)
- Tina Yothers as Jennifer Keaton
- Ed McMahon as Himself
- Fred Dryer as Sergeant Rick Hunter
- Michael Tucker as Stuart Markowitz
- Jimmy Smits as Victor Sifuentes
- Alan Rachins as Douglas Brackman, Jr.
- Richard A. Dysart as Leland Mackenzie
- Corbin Bernsen as Arnie Becker
- Blair Underwood as Jonathan Rollins
- Harry Hamlin as Michael Kuzak
- George Wendt as Norm Peterson
- Woody Harrelson as Woody Boyd
- Ted Danson as Sam Malone
- Kelsey Grammer as Frasier Crane
- Rhea Perlman as Carla Tortelli
- John Ratzenberger as Cliff Clavin
- Kirstie Alley as Rebecca Howe
- Cheech Marin as the Disneyland custodian
- Phylicia Rashad as the Disneyland dancer
- Bea Arthur as Dorothy Zbornak
- Estelle Getty as Sophia Petrillo
- Rue McClanahan as Blanche Devereaux
- Betty White as Rose Nylund
- Burt Reynolds as Himself
- Dyan Cannon as Herself
- Phil Collins as Himself
- Annette Funicello as Herself
- Bette Midler as Herself
- Barbara Hershey as Herself

=== Voice cast ===
- Wayne Allwine as Mickey Mouse
- Tony Anselmo as Donald Duck
- Peter Cullen as the Wizard
- Russi Taylor as Minnie Mouse

== See also ==
- Mickey's 50, a 1978 special honoring Mickey Mouse's 50th birthday.
- Mickey's 90th Spectacular, a 2018 special honoring Mickey Mouse's 90th birthday.
