= Mickey's 50 =

- The Wonderful World of Disney episode
- Episode no.: Season 25; Episode 9
- Directed by: Mike Jittlov; Phil May
- Written by: Phil May
- Original air date: November 19, 1978
- Running time: 90 minutes

Episode chronology
← Previous "The Boatniks"	Next → "Christmas at Walt Disney World"

"Mickey's 50" is a 1978 television special honoring the 50-year anniversary of the debut of Walt Disney's animated character Mickey Mouse. The show aired on NBC on November 19, 1978, one day after Mickey's official birthday, as a special 90-minute edition of The Wonderful World of Disney.

== Summary ==
This show covers the history and career of Mickey Mouse from his humble beginnings in the first Disney sound cartoon Steamboat Willie to his popularity in the 1930s, his presence on television through The Mickey Mouse Club, and his role as the official host of Disneyland and Walt Disney World. Also covered are his relationships with his co-stars, including his girlfriend Minnie Mouse and his nemesis Peg-Leg Pete, and how his success helped build Walt Disney Productions into the entertainment empire it is today.

Throughout the show, a variety of special guest stars and celebrities appear to introduce various anecdotes about Mickey's career and to wish him a happy birthday. Also shown is a three-part live-action/stop-motion short film by Mike Jittlov revolving around a man (played by Jittlov himself) who is tormented by his vast collection of Mickey merchandise. The show closes with a performance of the original song "(The Whole World Wants to Wish You) Happy Birthday Mickey Mouse".

== List of special guests ==
- Jack Albertson
- Edward Asner
- Anne Bancroft
- Edgar Bergen
- Ken Berry
- Jacqueline Bisset
- Mel Brooks
- Carol Burnett
- Levar Burton
- Red Buttons
- Ruth Buzzi
- Dyan Cannon
- Cantinflas
- Karen and Richard Carpenter
- Johnny Carson
- Charo
- Chewbacca
- Hans Conried
- Dick Clark
- Susan Clark
- Bette Davis
- Phyllis Diller
- Dale Evans
- Sally Field
- Gerald Ford
- Jodie Foster
- Kermit the Frog
- Annette Funicello
- Eva Gabor
- Steve Garvey
- Elliott Gould
- Rev. Billy Graham
- Goldie Hawn
- Helen Hayes
- Sterling Holloway
- Bob Hope
- Bruce Jenner
- Elton John
- Dean Jones
- Shirley Jones
- Alex Karras
- Gene Kelly
- Christopher Lee
- R2-D2
- Rich Little
- Roger Miller
- Anne Murray
- Joe Namath
- Willie Nelson
- Gary Owens
- Gregory Peck
- Peter Sellers
- Doc Severinsen
- O. J. Simpson
- Helen Reddy
- Burt Reynolds
- Adam Rich
- Kenny Rogers
- Roy Rogers
- Mickey Rooney
- Ronnie Schell
- Shields and Yarnell
- Peter Strauss
- James Stewart
- Dick Van Patten
- Jan-Michael Vincent
- Barbara Walters
- Raquel Welch
- Lawrence Welk
- Henry Winkler
- Jonathan Winters
- Jo Anne Worley

== See also ==
- Mickey's 60th Birthday, a 1988 special honoring Mickey Mouse's 60th birthday.
- Mickey's 90th Spectacular, a 2018 special honoring Mickey Mouse's 90th birthday.
