= PES (director) =

American animator

- Born: Adam Pesapane; 26 May 1973 (age 53); Dover, New Jersey
- Education: University of Virginia (BA) Delbarton School
- Occupations: Animator; Film Director; Artist

YouTube information
- Channel: PESfilm
- Years active: 2007–present
- Genres: stop-motion animation; pixilation
- Subscribers: 4.45 million
- Views: 1.43 billion
- Last updated: November 23, 2026

Adam Pesapane (born May 26, 1973), known by the pseudonym PES, is an American director and animator. He has created several stop motion films and commercials, which has earned him nominations for an Oscar and an Emmy Award.

After receiving a B.A. in English Literature at the University of Virginia, PES migrated to film as a storytelling medium. He earned critical acclaim for the short film Fresh Guacamole (2012), which was nominated for the Academy Award for Best Animated Short Film, making it the shortest film ever nominated for an Oscar. He created "Paper", a commercial for Honda Motor Co., which earned him a nomination for the Primetime Emmy Award for Outstanding Commercial in 2016.

PES' distinct use of everyday objects and stop-motion animation has garnered a positive reception from critics and audiences. His other known works are the short films Roof Sex, KaBoom!, Game Over, Western Spaghetti and Submarine Sandwich.

== Early life ==
Pesapane was born on May 26, 1973, in Dover, New Jersey, the son of an elementary school principal and a hairdresser. The name "PES" is a family nickname deriving from the Italian surname "Pesapane".

Pesapane grew up in an Italian-American household in the Budd Lake section of Mount Olive Township, New Jersey, and showed an early facility for drawing and painting. He attended Delbarton School, one of the nation's top private high schools, where he began exhibiting and selling his artwork.

Pesapane attended the University of Virginia as an Echols Scholar. In 1995 he earned a B.A. in English Literature and wrote his senior thesis on James Joyce's Ulysses. In addition to his English degree, Pesapane studied printmaking throughout all four years of college. He wrote and illustrated his own books, hand printing them using 15th-century techniques, and even made the paper they were printed on by pulping his own underwear.

In his senior year at U.Va, Pesapane lived on The Lawn, one of the University's highest honors. He lived at 33 West Lawn, in the room directly above the cornerstone of the University set by Thomas Jefferson in 1817.

After graduation, Pesapane moved to New York City where he landed his first job in the creative department of McCann-Erickson, a large advertising agency. He was hired because the agency's creative recruiter liked his portfolio of etchings, woodcuts, and lithographs, even though they bore no relevance to advertising.

Once inside the agency, Pesapane had daily exposure to award-winning commercials, short films, and music videos from around the world and first began thinking about making a film of his own. He cites the work of the Swedish directing collective Traktor, Michel Gondry, and Spike Jonze as influences from this period.

In 1998, while still working at the agency, Pesapane made his first film, a live-action short called Dogs of War. Based on a dream Pesapane had about hot dogs being dropped as bombs, the 48-second film "anticipates PES's animation work through the use of absurd humor, placing everyday objects in unfamiliar situations and slick editing that clearly shows the influence of advertising films."

== Career ==
=== 2000s ===
PES's first animated film, Roof Sex which was released in June 2001, features two life-sized chairs having sex on a New York rooftop. Though only a minute long, the film took 20 shooting days to complete. Having no prior experience with animation, PES taught himself how to animate by doing tests with doll furniture in his NYC apartment. In 2002, Roof Sex won the Best First Film award at the Annecy International Animated Film Festival. Roof Sex was featured at over 100 film festivals worldwide and won numerous awards.

The war short KaBoom! (2004) was instrumental in defining the artist's personal style and approach to animating objects. The film features an atomic airstrike on a miniature city using children's toys and festive objects such as gift bows, Christmas ornaments, and clown-head cupcake toppers. Originally commissioned by Diesel as part of its "Diesel Dreams" advertising campaign which launched in August 2004, KaBoom! was included on a DVD (along with 29 other short films) that was given away in stores worldwide when a pair of jeans was purchased. A "Making of KaBoom!" narrated by PES is available on the director's website and gives insight into the logic behind the object use and selection.

In October 2006 PES released his short Game Over, recreating classic arcade death sequences (from the games Centipede, Frogger, Asteroids, Space Invaders, and Pac-Man) with familiar objects including muffins, toy cars, insects, pizza and fried eggs. The film was inspired by an interview with Toru Iwatani, the creator of Pac-Man, who said the original source of inspiration for the Pac-Man character was a pizza with a slice missing. In July 2016, PES published a newly remastered HD version of Game Over on his YouTube Channel.

In July 2008, PES released his short Western Spaghetti. The film shows PES cooking spaghetti (the hands in the film are PES's) but all the ingredients in the dish are replaced with objects such as tomato pin cushions, rubber bands, Rubik's Cubes, post-it notes, and bubble wrap, and all are brought to life through stop-motion animation. TIME Magazine named Western Spaghetti the #2 Internet film of 2008 in its "Top Ten of Everything 2008". The film also won an Honorable Mention at the 2009 Sundance Film Festival and the Audience Award at the Annecy International Animated Film Festival in June 2009.

In November 2007 PES launched his own version of the classic "Yule Log" television program, creating a miniature fireplace loop using pretzel logs and candy corn animated in stop-motion. It was the world's first animated "Yule Log." Originally released in an edition of 1000 DVDs, the film is now available to stream in 4K on the director's YouTube Channel.

PES has also directed over 75 TV commercials, including spots for The Gates Notes (2021), Corona (2019) Honda (2017, 2016, 2015), Android (2015), Kinder Surprise (2011), Washington State Lottery (2010), Scrabble (2008), Sprint (2007), Sneaux Shoes ("Human Skateboard", 2007), Orange (2006), Bacardi (2005), and Coinstar (2005). The commercial for Sneaux, "Human Skateboard", became an internet phenomenon in 2007, amassing millions of views online. In June 2008 Director Michel Gondry was quoted in Paste magazine as saying "Clicking on a PES film is to open a safe and suddenly see a million ideas glittering and exploding. The only reason you close the door is to re-open it just after and discover what will pop this time."

=== 2010s ===
In December 2010, PES's short The Deep premiered in Episode 1 of Showtime Network's "Short Stories" series (PES's films were the source of inspiration for the series). The Deep features various metallic objects including old hand tools, nut crackers, calipers, film lenses, faucet knobs, chains, skeleton keys, a bike horn, a belt of bullets, and a piece of a flute that come to life as mysterious sea creatures. The film is an imaginary nature documentary.

In March 2012, PES released Fresh Guacamole, a follow-up to his stop-motion short Western Spaghetti (2008). The film features familiar objects such as grenades, a baseball, dice, Christmas tree bulbs, a miniature golf ball, and poker chips that are transformed into a dish of guacamole. In January 2013, Fresh Guacamole was nominated for the Academy Award for Best Animated Short Film. At 1 minute and 40 seconds, it is the shortest film ever nominated for an Oscar. The film premiered as part of Showtime's "Short Stories" series online and on TV. Showtime's YouTube posting of Fresh Guacamole amassed 3.5 million hits in its first 4 days online. Of the initial idea, PES says "I had the core idea of a grenade as an avocado. Even though this type of grenade is referred to as a "Pineapple Grenade" I've always thought they looked more like avocados. I built the film around this idea, filling in the blanks and ingredients around it." As in Western Spaghetti, the hands in the film are PES's. After being nominated for an Academy Award, Fresh Guacamole was released along with all the other 15 Oscar-nominated short films in theaters by ShortsHD.

On December 8, 2014, PES released Submarine Sandwich, the third film in his stop-motion food film trilogy, and the follow-up film to Fresh Guacamole. The film is set in an old Italian deli in which all the meats and cold cuts have been substituted with vintage athletic equipment such as boxing gloves (ham), footballs (roast beef), baseball gloves (turkey), hockey gloves (wieners), punching bags, old tube socks and soccer balls (various cheeses). The film depicts the construction of a large submarine sandwich in which all the ingredients are non edible items such as Slinky toys, shredded US currency, View-Master reels, etc, which are chosen because of their resemblance in some way to the ingredients they represent.

As in Fresh Guacamole and Western Spaghetti the hands featured in the film are PES's. The role of the butcher in the film is also played by PES, the first time the director has made a cameo appearance in one of his own films. The film was sponsored by Nikon (and was shot on the Nikon D810 camera) and the remainder of the funding was raised through Kickstarter. PES has stated that he got the idea for the film when he saw a Hobart 410 "Streamliner" deli slicer in an exhibit of industrial design at the Museum of Modern Art and was struck by the image of slicing a boxing glove in it.

On March 12, 2012, Deadline Hollywood reported that PES was set to direct a feature film based on the Garbage Pail Kids trading card series originally published by Topps in 1985. The film was to be based on a story by PES and writer Michael Vukadinovich. Former Disney CEO Michael Eisner was set to produce the film through Eisner's The Tornante Company. The film was later cancelled.

On November 17, 2012, Wired magazine reported that PES has a second feature film project in development entitled "Lost & Found." Based on an original idea and incorporating the director's signature style, PES is teaming up with and Katz/Smith Productions and the writer Seth Grahame-Smith on story development.

His commercial for Honda, "Paper", received an Emmy Award Nomination for "Outstanding Commercial of 2016" in addition to picking up many advertising industry awards in 2016, including a Gold Lion at Cannes, a Gold Pencil at The One Show as well as The One Show's "Automobile Advertising of the Year Award". It was also selected to the permanent collection at the Musée de la Publicité at the Louvre and the Museum of Modern Art.

In August 2016 a new commercial PES directed for the Honda Ridgeline premiered during the Opening Ceremony of the Rio Olympics. Officially called "The Power of Ridgeline", the spot is the director's largest production to date and features workers (who appear as ghosted blurred streaks) building a massive version of the Honda Logo utilizing materials they brought to the location using Ridgeline pickup trucks. The film was mostly shot in-camera and features a mixture of long exposure photography, stop-motion animation, live-action, and CGI.

=== 2020s ===
In 2020, PES created a two-minute “Shoe Ballet” sequence that appears in the feature documentary Salvatore: Shoemaker of Dreams, which premiered at the Venice Film Festival. The film was released in the United States by Sony Pictures Classics in 2022. The sequence, produced and animated entirely in CGI, features hundreds of pairs of shoes arranged on a tiered, rotating structure inspired by Busby Berkeley’s “human waterfall” scene from Footlight Parade (1933).

In 2021, PES created an advertisement for The Gates Notes announcing “Mosquito Week,” a campaign raising awareness of mosquito-borne diseases.

In 2022, PES created a new main title sequence for the Dutch television program Het Klokhuis. The sequence replaced his earlier 2013 version, which had served as the show’s opener for ten years. Like its predecessor, the updated sequence incorporates primarily 3D-printed elements that were photographed and animated using stop-motion techniques.

PES created a stop-motion YouTube logo, known as a “Yoodle,” which appeared on the platform’s homepage in over 100 countries on November 4, 2023.

In 2024, PES created the production logo for Dev Patel’s production company, Minor Realm, which appears at the beginning of Monkey Man.

Since 2023, PES has been developing an ongoing personal art project centered on vintage animated buttons, which he periodically shares on social media. A release date for the project has not been announced.

== Filmography ==
=== Short films ===
- Shoe Ballet (2020) (appears in Salvatore: Shoemaker of Dreams)
- Lens Smash (2018)
- Still Life (2018)
- Submarine Sandwich (2014)
- Black Gold (2014)
- Fresh Guacamole (2012)
- The Deep (2010)
- Western Spaghetti (2008)
- The Fireplace (aka Yule Log) (2007)
- My Pepper Heart
- Cake Countdown (2007)
- Game Over (2006)
- Making of KaBoom!
- KaBoom! (2004)
- Fireworks (2004)
- Making of Roof Sex
- Pee-Nut (2003)
- Drowning Nut
- Baby Nut
- Moth
- Marriage is for...
- Prank Call (2003)
- Rogue Peanut
- Roof Sex (2001)
- Dogs of War (first film, 1998)

=== Commercials ===
- 'Minor Realm' Production Logo (2024)
- YouTube Homepage Logo (2023)
- Het Klokhuis (Title Sequence) (2023) (NL)
- The Gates Notes "Mosquito Week" (2021)
- Corona x Parley "THE FISH" (2019)
- Samsung "Octopus" and "Ice Block" (2018)
- Hoka One One "Bondi" and "Yee-Haw!" (2018)
- Honda "Clarity" (2017)
- Honda "The Power of Ridgeline" (2016)
- Android "Fingerprints" (2015)
- Honda "Paper" (2015)
- Lipton "Mussel Beach" (2015)
- Ford Italia Tennis - 5 Vines (2015)
- Samsung Galaxy K Zoom - 3 Vines (2014)
- CitizenM Hotels "Swan Song" (2014)
- Het Klokhuis (Title Sequence) (2013) (NL)
- Kinder Surprise (2011) (UK)
- Washington State Lottery (2010)
- Scrabble "60th Anniversary" (2008)
- More Than "Journey"(2008)(UK)
- More Than "Motor"(2007)(UK)
- More Than "Home"(2007)(UK)
- Sprint (2007)
- Sneaux Shoes "Human Skateboard" (2007)
- PlayStation PSP "Fred" (2006) (UK)
- PlayStation PSP "Milo & Maria" (2006 (UK)
- Orange Telecom "Socks" (2006) (UK)
- Blue Cross (2005)
- Coinstar "Gift" (2005)
- Coinstar "Book" (2005)
- Bacardi Coco (2005)
- Bacardi Razz (2005)
- Bacardi Apple (2005)
- Bacardi Limon (2005)
- Coinstar "Inspired Coins" (2005)
- Los Angeles Dodgers "Bobbleheads" (2005)
- Nike "Wild Horses Redux" (2003)
- MoveOn.org "Missing" (2003)
- Glacier Glove
- The Learning Channel "Beasty Boy"
- Tic Tac "Whittlin' Wood"
