= Mickey's 90th Spectacular =

- Written by: Eli Bauman; Wendy Button; Sara Lukinson; Joe Saunders
- Directed by: Don Mischer; Jeff Roe
- Country of origin: United States
- Original language: English

Production
- Executive producers: Charlie Haykel; Juliane Hare
- Producer: Don Mischer
- Production location: Los Angeles, California
- Camera setup: Multi-camera
- Running time: 85 minutes
- Production companies: Don Mischer Productions; ABC Entertainment

Original release
- Network: ABC
- Release: November 4, 2018

Mickey's 90th Spectacular is a two-hour television special broadcast on ABC on November 4, 2018. It celebrates the 90th anniversary of the debut of Walt Disney's animated character Mickey Mouse.

== Production ==
In August 2018, Disney announced Mickey's 90th Spectacular, "an evening of musical performances, moving tributes, and rare short films never before seen by the public". It was produced and directed by Don Mischer, who previously helmed the Disney specials The Muppets Celebrate Jim Henson and The Grand Opening of Euro Disney; Charlie Haykel and Juliane Hare served as executive producers.

Many guest stars appeared during the show, including Skylar Astin, Kelsea Ballerini, Kristen Bell, Miles Brown, Dwayne "The Rock" Johnson, Tom Holland, Anna Camp, Sofia Carson, Tony Hale, Sarah Hyland, Wendi McLendon-Covey and Sage Steele, as well as original Mouseketeers Bobby Burgess and Sharon Baird, and Disney Chairman and CEO Bob Iger.

The special was taped at the Shrine Auditorium on October 6 of the same year.

== Musical performances ==
Performer	Song
Fitz and the Tantrums	"HandClap"
Sofia Carson	"Part of Your World"
Zac Brown Band	"The Bare Necessities"
Various	"Friend Like Me"
Tori Kelly	"Colors of the Wind"
NCT 127	"Regular"
Meghan Trainor	"You've Got a Friend in Me"
Luis Fonsi	"Imposible"
Josh Groban	"Granted"
Leslie Odom Jr.	"When You Wish Upon a Star"
Disney Cast Member and Employee Choir and Alumni	"Mickey Mouse March"
Various	"Happy Birthday to You"

== Release ==
Mickey's 90th Spectacular aired on ABC on November 4, 2018, two weeks prior to Mickey's official 90th anniversary.

== See also ==
- Mickey's 50, a 1978 special honoring Mickey Mouse's 50th birthday.
- Mickey's 60th Birthday, a 1988 special honoring Mickey Mouse's 60th birthday.
