= Behind the Beats, Vol. 2 =

Behind The Beats, Vol. 2

Compilation album by Danny!
- Released: October 23, 2007 (Japan)
- Recorded: 2004–2007
- Genre: Hip hop
- Length: 27:14
- Label: Badenov Records/1911 Music
- Producer: Danny!

Danny! chronology
| Behind The Beats, Vol. 1 (2007) | Behind The Beats, Vol. 2 (2007) | Dream, Extinguished (2008) |

Professional ratings
Review scores
| Source | Rating |
|---|---|
| Allmusic | (not yet rated) link |

American rapper/producer Danny! released Behind The Beats, Vol. 2 on October 23, 2007 (see 2007 in music) under his Badenov Records/1911 Music imprint. It is the second promotional album in his Behind The Beats series, which is made up of snippets from twenty songs from Danny's catalogue followed by a snippet from its sample playing directly afterwards. Like Vol. 1 before it, the album cover for Behind The Beats, Vol. 2 depicts beets being prepared for consumption, presumably a play on the homonymous title. Both installments of Behind The Beats were mixed and compiled by Danny himself, and are both extremely hard to find due to a limited number of copies being pressed.

Danny released both Behind The Beats discs under his real name, Daniel Swain, which is the same name he uses when releasing his instrumental albums.

== Track listing ==
1. "It's Okay"
2. "I'm Back"
3. "Check It Out (remix)"
4. "The College Kicked-Out Intro"
5. "Strange Fruit"
6. "F.O.O.D."
7. "Rhyme Writer Crime Fighter"
8. "Clap Back"
9. "No Guarantees (remix)"
10. "I Only Wanna Be With You"
11. "You Owe Me"
12. "Now You're Back"
13. "I'm Movin' Out"
14. "Regrets"
15. "Temptation"
16. "Fullaschidt (remix)"
17. "It Changes"
18. "Can't Wait"
19. "Give Me A Chance"
20. "Fly, Pt. 2"
