= 21st Century Masters: The Millennium Collection: The Best of Danny! =

Greatest hits album by Danny!
- Released: August 7, 2007
- Length: 78:12
- Label: Badenov Records/1911 Music
- Producer: Danny!

Danny! chronology
Danny Is Dead (2007)	21st Century Masters: The Millennium Collection: The Best of Danny! (2007)	Behind The Beats, Vol. 1 (2007)

Professional ratings
Review scores
Source	Rating
Allmusic	link
RapReviews.com	link

21st Century Masters – The Millennium Collection: The Best of Danny! is a 2007 compilation album by American rapper/producer Danny!, and the seventh self-released album on his vanity 1911 Music/Badenov Records label. The LP, released eleven days shy of his 24th birthday, features approximately five songs from each of his first four studio albums. A bonus track, "Fullaschidt (remix)", appears at the album's closing.

Despite its resemblance, the album is not affiliated in any way with 20th Century Masters: The Millennium Collection, a compilation series published and overseen by the Universal Music Group.

A second installment, The Best Of Danny!, was released as a mixtape on SoundCloud via Okayplayer Records in September 2012.

== Track listing ==
1. "I Need a Publicist"
2. "Charm"
3. "The World Is Yours"
4. "I'm Movin' Out"
5. "Fullaschidt" (feat. 'Drea)
6. "Rhyme Writer Crime Fighter"
7. "My Baby"
8. "I Only Wanna Be With You" (feat. Ms. Lisha)
9. "Check It Out (remix)"
10. "I'm Back"
11. "Fly" (feat. Peace)
12. "Second Time Around"
13. "V.I.P."
14. "Strange Fruit" (feat. Peace and 'Drea)
15. "My Whole World"
16. "Café Surreàl"
17. "I Wish"
18. "Where Were You" (feat. 'Drea)
19. "Fly, Pt. 2"
20. "Café Surreàl, Pt. 2"
21. "Fullaschidt (remix)"
