= Pax Amicus Theatre =

Community theater in Budd Lake, New Jersey, U.S.

Pax Amicus Castle Theatre
- Pax Amicus
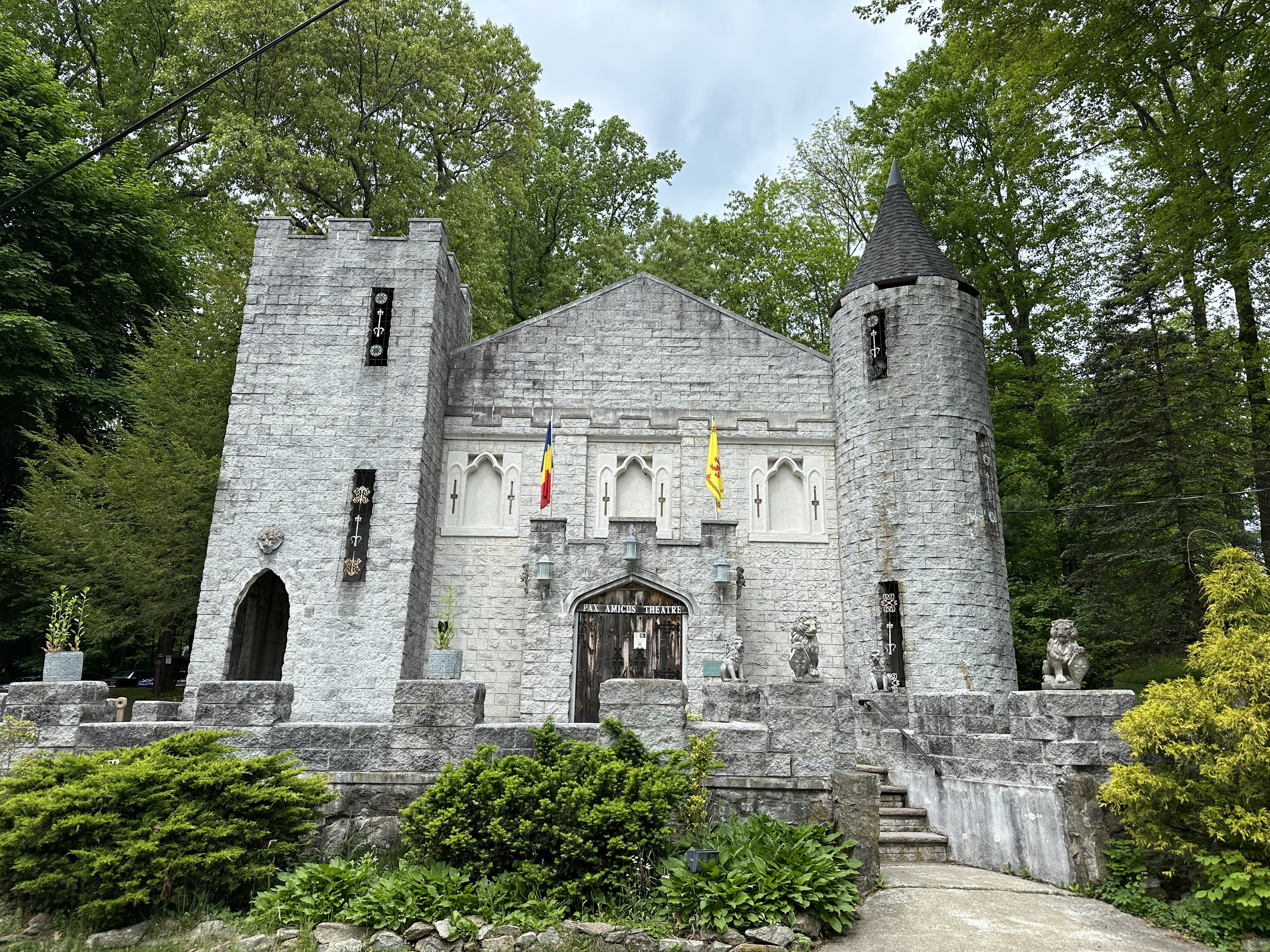
- Pax Amicus in 2024
- Interactive map of Pax Amicus Castle Theatre
- Address: 23 Lake Shore Rd; Budd Lake, New Jersey; U.S.
- Coordinates: 40.8659°N 74.7528°W

Construction
- Opened: 1970

Website
- www.paxamicus.com

The Pax Amicus Theater is located in Budd Lake, New Jersey, United States, and was founded in 1970. This community theater produces a full year-round season of Broadway and off-Broadway revivals, professional productions of works by Shakespeare and Edgar Allan Poe, a program devoted to children's theater, and special events throughout the year. The architecture of the theater is designed to look like a medieval castle.
