= The Secret Adventures of Tom Thumb =

1993 film

- DVD cover
- Directed by: Dave Borthwick
- Written by: Dave Borthwick
- Produced by: Richard Hutchinson
- Starring: Nick Upton; Deborah Collard
- Cinematography: Dave Borthwick; Frank Passingham
- Edited by: Dave Borthwick
- Music by: Startled Insects; John Paul Jones
- Production companies: BBC Bristol; bolexbrothers
- Distributed by: Manga Entertainment
- Release date: 10 December 1993
- Running time: 60 minutes
- Country: United Kingdom
- Language: English

The Secret Adventures of Tom Thumb is a 1993 British independent stop-motion/pixilation adult animated science-fantasy dystopian adventure horror film directed, written, shot and edited by Dave Borthwick, produced by bolexbrothers studio and funded by Richard Hutchinson, BBC, La Sept and Manga Entertainment, which also distributed the film on video.

The story follows the tiny Tom Thumb as he is abducted from his loving parents and taken to an experimental laboratory, and his subsequent escape. He discovers a community of similarly sized people living in a swamp, who help him on his journey to return to his parents. The film is largely dialogue-free, limited mostly to grunts and other non-verbal vocalisations.

== Plot ==
Inside an artificial insemination factory, a mechanical wasp hovering around the establishment is crushed to death by the machinery's gears, causing its vitals to drop into one of the jars on the conveyor belt. This results in a woman giving birth to a thumb-sized fetus-like child in her and her husband's house in a grim and slum urban town. Outside, a man in a black suit witnesses the whole scene and goes to an alley to encounter Pa Thumb, who picks up a ventriloquist box-shaped doll house to make his son's bedroom. The man simply grins at him but leaves when he gets creeped out by the ventriloquist's dummy at the window of a toy shop.

Pa and Ma Thumb decide to call their diminutive son "Tom", but their time with him is short-lived. He's soon kidnapped and taken to a laboratory to be studied and experimented on. After engineering an escape with the help of one of the lab's other captives, Tom finds himself in a town populated by people his size. There he meets Jack, a young warrior who hates the bigger people, whom he and the others call giants. Nonetheless, Tom convinces Jack to help him attempt to find his father.

== Production ==
The Secret Adventures of Tom Thumb was made using a combination of stop-motion animation and pixilation (live actors posed and shot frame-by-frame), often with live actors and puppets sharing the frame. It was originally commissioned as a 10-minute short for BBC2's Christmas programming, but was rejected for being too dark for the festive season. The short version nevertheless garnered critical acclaim through showings at animation festivals, and a feature-length version was commissioned by the BBC a year later.

== Awards ==
- 1993 - Sitges - Catalan International Film Festival - Best Director
- 1993 - Cinanima Espinho Portugal - Best Feature
- 1994 - Fantasporto - International Fantasy Film Award - Best Director
- 1994 - Fantasporto - Critics' Award - Special Mention
- 1994 - Houston Worldfest - Gold Special Jury Award - Feature Film
- 1994 - San Francisco International Film Festival - Best Animation
- 1994 - Worldfest Charleston - Gold Special Jury Award - Feature Film
- 1994 - Video Home Entertainment - Award of Excellence
- 1995 - Evening Standard British Film Award - Best Technical/Artistic Achievement
- 1995 - Yubari International Fantastic Film Festival - Special Jury Prize - Feature Film
- 1995 - Atlanta Film and Video Festival - Best Animated Film
- 1995 - Mediawave - Grand Prix
- 1995 - Mediawave - Audience Prize
- 1996 - Európai Animációs Játékfilm Fesztivál - 1st Prize

== Bibliography ==
- Kowalski, Frankie (1 June 1996). "Instinctive Decisions - Dave Borthwick, Radical Independent". Animation World Magazine.
- Toonhound - The Secret Adventures of Tom Thumb
- Eye Weekly - The Secret Adventures of Tom Thumb
