= Eric Leiser =

American filmmaker and animator

- Born: Los Angeles, California, US
- Occupations: Artist, filmmaker, animator
- Years active: 1997 – present
- Notable work: Imagination

Eric Leiser is an American, filmmaker, animator and holographer.

== Career ==
Born in California, Leiser earned a bachelor's degree in animation at the California Institute of the Arts while developing the stop-motion series Twilight Park. During its conception, Leiser worked props on SpongeBob SquarePants. Leiser's holograms have been shown at a number of galleries.

He has made numerous short films, eight of which appear in the DVD release Eclectic Shorts by Eric Leiser, and four features: Faustbook, Imagination, Glitch in the Grid, and Apocalypsis.

Leiser conceived Glitch in the Grid in response to a fallout with a producer over a film Leiser wrote that was set in Iceland. On June 6, 2011, Glitch in the Grid premiered at the Annecy International Animated Film Festival.

Leiser's 2016 short film "Anthropic Principle" was included in "Dreamlands: Immersive Cinema and Art, 1905–2016" (October 28, 2016 – February 5, 2017) at the Whitney Museum of American Art in New York City.

== Personal life ==
After Leiser married Jenny Colville on October 31, 2009, he and his wife lived briefly in Hastings, England, and by February 2010 were residing in New York City.

An Orthodox Christian, Leiser in 2008 said of his work, "I don't really want to make 'Christian film' necessarily, like the things you find in Christian bookstores. I prefer to explore experimental film techniques that still glorify God without being blatant or preachy. I do like to leave much of the symbolism to the audience's own interpretations."
