= Foods (journal) =

- Discipline: Food science
- Language: English
- Edited by: Arun K. Bhunia

Publication details
- History: 2012–present
- Publisher: MDPI
- Frequency: Continuous
- Open access: Yes
- License: Creative Commons Attribution License
- Impact factor: 5.2 (2022)

Standard abbreviations
- ISO 4: Foods

Indexing
- CODEN: FOODBV
- ISSN: 2304-8158
- OCLC no.: 870683179

Links
- Journal homepage

Foods is a peer-reviewed scientific journal covering various aspects of food science. It is published by MDPI and was established in 2012. The editor-in-chief is Arun K. Bhunia (Purdue University).

The journal publishes research articles, reviews, and commentaries related to food research, including food chemistry, food toxicology, food engineering, and quality.

== Abstracting and indexing ==
The journal is abstracted and indexed, for example, in:

- DOAJ
- ProQuest databases
- CAB Abstracts
- Science Citation Index Expanded
- Scopus

According to the Journal Citation Reports, the journal has a 2022 impact factor of 5.2.
