= Imagination (film) =

- cover art for Imagination
- Directed by: Eric Leiser
- Written by: Eric Leiser; Jeffrey Leiser
- Produced by: Jules Engel; Laura Leiser; Joseph Cahill; Robert Berry
- Starring: Ed Gildersleeve; Jessi Haddad; Nikki Haddad; Courtney Sanford
- Cinematography: Nathan Meier animation: Eric Leiser
- Edited by: Eric Leiser; Tyler Phillips
- Music by: Jeffrey Leiser
- Production company: Albino Fawn Productions
- Distributed by: Vanguard International Cinema
- Release date: April 30, 2007 (Aarhus Festival of Independent Arts)
- Running time: 70 minutes
- Country: United States
- Language: English

Imagination is a 2007 American avant-garde animated/live action film, and the first feature length project directed by Eric Leiser, about young twin sisters who have Asperger syndrome.

== Production and release ==
The project was shot on locations in Prague, Czech Republic, Los Angeles and San Francisco. The film premiered on April 30, 2007 at the 2007 AFIA film festival in Aarhus, Denmark, and was released theatrically in the United States on July 6, 2007, and worldwide by Vanguard International Cinema on February 26, 2008. The DVD release contains extra footage that includes "Making Imagination", "Behind the animation", "Q&A with filmmakers", and "Isolated scenes", as well as special cuts of the soundtrack. It was also featured at the International Animated Film Festival in Istanbul in December 2007.

== Synopsis ==
Redheaded twins Anna (Nikki Haddad) and Sarah (Jessi Haddad) Woodruff, roughly 10 or 11 years old, both have Asperger syndrome, an autism spectrum disorder (ASD), and Sarah is going blind. Child psychologist and researcher Dr. Reineger (Edmund Gildersleeve) tries to assure their parents (Courtney Sanford, Travis Poelle) that the kids are smart and "intricately involved in their own imagination". The children enter an institute to be studied, two family tragedies occur, and the girls escape the institution. Throughout much of the film, we see a magical, distorted world through their eyes.

== Critical response ==
Frank Lovece of Film Journal International found this "sad and hypnotic tale" a film that "well evokes the trauma, abandonment fears and magical reality of childhood", and that the film "sweeps us through an array of gently bizarre beasties, times and places, such as a primordial forest where the white elms are covered with eyes. The most amazing sequence involves an earthquake evinced solely through shaky camera, sound effects, stop-motion dirt and rocks and rapid-fire cuts."

Joe Leydon of Variety was less impressed, writing of the film that it was "[s]tylistically pretentious and narratively impenetrable", with "[p]erformances [that] are amateurish at best, and threadbare production values — best typified by a scene where an earthquake is indicated with nothing more than herky-jerky camera movements — recall such campy cheapies as Manos: The Hands of Fate." He did grant that "its flashes of imaginative animation might be enough to tempt exceptionally hardy festgoers."

Douglas Perry of The Oregonian found that the animated portions of the film had "buckets of ambition and, well, imagination; the surreal visuals are always interesting and at times pretty incredible. Eric Leiser's proficiency and flair in employing a variety of animation techniques is most impressive." Conversely, he found "the live-action scenes ... visually dull and amateurishly acted, weighed down by a ponderous, confusing plot concerning bizarre, quasi-spiritual visions".

DVD Talk called it "a wonderful film to WATCH, allowing yourself to simply sit back and allow the images to wash over you. Leiser may lean toward early David Lynch, especially when it comes to mixing the beautiful with the disturbing, but there are also snippets of Ken Russell and Darren Aronofsky in his style and approach." The reviewer found the characters one-dimensional and forgettable, writing that, "[o]n the human side of things, Imagination is only decent'", but countered that "thanks to the outsized originality of the man behind the camera, this is one eclectic offering that stays with you long after it's over."

DVD Verdict said, "The appropriately-titled Imagination is a fascinating watch. Leiser, who has an animation background, employs every animation style he knows throughout the film, creating one of the most visually rich movies of recent years."

Courtney Ferguson of The Portland Mercury considered the musical score and the animation to be "one of the ... reasons to continue watching" and called ithem "interesting and surreal". She felt overall that "it's nearly impossible to get past [the film's] bad storyline and artsy drudgery".

== Partial cast ==
- Ed K. Gildersleeve as Dr. Reineger
- Nikki Haddad as Anna Woodruff
- Jessi Haddad as Sarah Woodruff
- Courtney Sanford as Janice Woodruff
- Travis Poelle as Roland Woodruff
- Anthony Caraday as Young Doctor Reineger
- Bob Gerlach as Pastor Bob
- Kevin Le as Kevin
- John Le as John
