= Mike Jittlov =

American animator (born 1948)

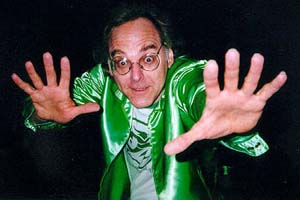
- Jittlov in 1996
- Born: June 8, 1948 (age 78); Los Angeles, California, U.S.
- Education: UCLA
- Known for: Special effects animation
- Notable work: The Wizard of Speed and Time
- Website: www.wizworld.com

Mike Jittlov (born June 8, 1948) is an American animator and the creator of short films and one feature-length film using forms of special effects animation, including stop-motion animation, rotoscoping, and pixilation. He is best known for the 1988 feature-length film The Wizard of Speed and Time, based on his 1979 short film of the same name.

== Career ==
Born in Los Angeles, Jittlov became a math major at UCLA. Jittlov took an animation course to satisfy his art requirement. He made a super-8 film, The Leap, enlarged to 16mm to participate in film festivals in the early 1970s. Jittlov entered a 16mm film made for his UCLA class, Good Grief, into Academy Awards competition. That short made it to the professional finals for nomination, the first of several of his short films to do so. Afterwards, Jittlov bought his own 16mm camera, designed his own multiplane animation system for $200, and began his career.

Some of his other original film shorts, including The Interview, Swing Shift, Animato, and Time Tripper (released separately and as a collection called Animato) won many top awards and repeat film festival screenings, bringing him to the attention of The Walt Disney Studio. In 1978, Jittlov co-starred on Disney's two-hour TV extravaganza, "Mickey's 50", with the short film "Mouse Mania", creating and animating the first stop-motion Mickey Mouse, along with 1,000 other Disney toys marching around a psychiatrist's office. The short is now featured on the Disney DVD Mickey Mouse in Living Color, Volume Two. Since Disney did not usually allow individual creators to receive credit on their television productions (preferring a generic thanks to "the many Disney animators who made this possible") Mike put his and partner Deven Cheregino's name on the toys in the final production number, where they could not be easily edited out.

In late 1979, he co-starred again on Disney's Major Effects television special — this time introducing the world to the 500 miles per hour (800 km/h) green-robed "Wizard of Speed and Time" via the short film version. With an improved soundtrack, the short was released to 16mm film collectors in 1980, along with four of his other short films.

Jittlov also created the inaugural short film played on the cable TV Disney Channel. It featured an animated satellite shaped like Mickey Mouse's head, which was later reproduced for the special features of the DVD version of Disney's 1937 film Snow White and the Seven Dwarfs. The Mickey Satellite film played to park-goers waiting in line at Space Mountain for years, and is still shown to Walt Disney Parks and Resorts employees during orientation. The prop was also used in a scene in The Wizard of Speed and Time.

Jittlov is best known for his feature film The Wizard of Speed and Time, which he directed and starred in. The film did poorly in theaters, but has established a cult following since its release on videotape and laserdisc. It can often be found online.

He later worked as a special effects technician on the film Ghost, and in fan films including Darth Vader's Psychic Hotline.

Jittlov maintains a distinctive appearance at science fiction conventions by wearing his traditional green jacket and green shoes, similar to the ones seen in The Wizard of Speed and Time. He was an early Internet user, with his own website, and frequent poster to his own Usenet group, alt.fan.mike-jittlov. He created a Jittlov Font for the Macintosh, and is a prolific practitioner of origami.
