= Food (film) =

- The film's poster
- Directed by: Jan Švankmajer
- Written by: Jan Švankmajer
- Produced by: Jaromír Kallista
- Cinematography: Svatopluk Malý
- Edited by: Marie Zemanová
- Production companies: Channel 4 Heart of Europe Prague; Koninck International; Athanor
- Distributed by: Zeitgeist Films
- Release date: June 8, 1992
- Running time: 17 minutes
- Countries: Czechoslovakia; United Kingdom

Food (Czech: Jídlo) is a 1992 Czech animated comedy short film directed by Jan Švankmajer that uses claymation and pixilation. It examines the human relationship with food by showing breakfast, lunch, and dinner.

== Plot ==
=== Breakfast ===
A man (Bedrich Glaser) enters a room, sits down at a table, and brushes a collection of leftovers onto the floor. Across from him sits another man with a placard attached to a chain hanging around his neck. The diner stands up and reads the placard one line at a time, following the instructions to get his food. He pinches the man's nose shut to get him to open his mouth, puts his money on the man's tongue, smacks him in the forehead to let the money enter his body, and pokes him in the eye to get his food. The man's shirt unbuttons itself, and the astonished diner watches as a dumbwaiter rises up to where the man's chest should be. The diner takes his food, and punches the man in the chin for his utensils. When he finishes eating, he kicks the man's shin for a napkin. After wiping his mouth, the diner convulses and goes limp. The man with the placard then comes to life, stretches, and places the placard on the former diner. He stands and puts another tally mark on the wall before he leaves. Another diner soon enters the room and reads the placard all at once, proceeding to repeat the scenario. After the second diner also convulses and goes limp, the original diner stands, stretches, and places the placard around the second diner's neck, adding another tally mark to the wall before he leaves. As the diner leaves, a line of people is seen stretching down the hall and around the corner.

=== Lunch ===
Two diners in a restaurant, a well-mannered businessman and a slovenly vagabond, are continuously unable to get their waiter's attention. As a means of remedying their situation, they proceed to eat everything in sight: the flowers, their napkins, their shoes, belts, pants, jackets, shirts, underwear, plates, tablecloth, table, and chairs, leaving both of them nude and seated on the floor. While this is happening, the vagabond watches the businessman, then eats what he eats. They also try to get the waiter's attention whenever he passes by, to no avail. In the end, after everything else has been eaten, the businessman eats his utensils, prompting the vagabond to eat his. The businessman then smiles, pulls his utensils from his mouth, and advances on the vagabond, who recoils in horror.

=== Dinner ===
In a luxurious restaurant, a wealthy gourmet sits at a table, adding many sauces, spices, and sides to his meal, which is hidden from the viewer by the sheer number of condiments. This process continues for a long time, during which the gourmet collects stains for the napkin on his lap. He then hammers nails into his wooden left hand, bending them so they can hold his fork. As the gourmet prepares to eat, his meal is revealed to be his missing hand, which he proceeds to cut into after removing his wedding ring. In a series of short and violent scenes, we are then shown similar customers eating parts of their own bodies in the same restaurant. An athlete eats his lower leg after removing his sneaker, a posh woman squeezes lemon juice onto a dessert composed of her breasts, and a slovenly patron in a pub who prepares to eat his genitals. As he realizes the presence of the camera, the man covers his genitals and shoos the camera away with his hand.

== Reception ==
A New York Times review called the film "caustically witty but slight." It goes on to say that "Švankmajer conceived the film in the 1970s, when it seemed too risky a political allegory to be made [...] it now seems too simple a statement about how people are devoured by mechanistic states and each other."

Michael Nottingham pointed out that "the humour is particularly black in [the last] segment, mocking how delicate social ritual and conditioning are effective masks for brutal self-destruction."

== Cast ==
- Ludvík Šváb as Eater #1
- Bedřich Glaser as Eater #2
- Jan Kraus as Eater #3
- Pavel Marek as Eater
- Josef Fiala as Eater #4
- Karel Hamr as Eater #5
