= Pixilation =

Type of animation using live-actors

Pixilation is a stop-motion technique in which live actors are used as a frame-by-frame subject in an animated film, by repeatedly posing while one or more frame is taken and changing pose slightly before the next frame or frames. This technique is often used as a way to blend live-actors with animated ones in a movie.

In Hôtel électrique (1908), Julienne Mathieu's hair appears to brush itself, one of the first uses of stop-motion animation in film.

Early examples of this technique are included in Segundo de Chomón's Cuisine magnétique and Hôtel électrique, both from 1908, and Émile Cohl's 1911 movie Jobard ne peut pas voir les femmes travailler (Jobard cannot see the women working).

The term is widely credited to Grant Munro (although some say it was Norman McLaren) and he made an experimental movie named "Pixillation", available in his DVD collection "Cut Up – The Films of Grant Munro."

== Films ==
- Norman McLaren's Oscar-winner Neighbours, A Chairy Tale (1957) and Two Bagatelles
- Chuck Menville and Len Janson's trilogy of pixilated short films Stop Look and Listen – 1967, Blaze Glory (1968) and Sergeant Swell of the Mounties (1972), along with their sequence in Daffy Duck and Porky Pig Meet the Groovie Goolies (1972)
- Mike Jittlov's short The Wizard of Speed and Time (1979). Jittlov made a feature film with many pixilation sequences, also titled The Wizard of Speed and Time (1989), based on the making of the original short.
- Monsieur Pointu (1975)
- Jan Kounen's Gisele Kerozene (1989)
- Tetsuo: The Iron Man (1989)
- Bolex Brothers' The Secret Adventures of Tom Thumb (1993)
- Numerous Jan Švankmajer movies, but most notably Food (1992) and large sections of Conspirators of Pleasure (1996).
- Michael Langan's Doxology (2007)
- Luminaris, a short film by Juan Pablo Zaramella (2011)
- Western Spaghetti (2008), the Academy Award-nominated Fresh Guacamole (2012), and Submarine Sandwich (2014) by PES utilize pixilation.
- Glenn Barit's Cleaners (2019) utilize pixilation in black-and-white with intrusion of colour through clothing.

== Television shows ==
- Angry Kid
- Sesame Street (Milo Counting, Ordering a Pizza, George the Farmer)
- The Goodies
- Rex the Runt
- The Flash (1990 TV series)

== Music videos ==
- "All the Way to Heaven" by Doug E. Fresh and The Get Fresh Crew
- "And She Was" by Talking Heads
- "Baby C'mon" by Stephen Malkmus
- "Be Near Me" by ABC
- "Big Time" by Peter Gabriel
- "The Box" by Orbital
- "Bridge to Your Heart" by Wax
- "Cold" by Tears for Fears
- "Consolation Prizes" by Phoenix
- "End Love" by OK Go
- "The End of the World" by The Cure
- "Every Teardrop Is A Waterfall" by Coldplay
- "Fix" by Jean-Paul De Roover
- "The Hardest Button to Button" by The White Stripes
- "Heard 'Em Say" by Kanye West
- "Hello Again" by The Cars
- "Her Morning Elegance" by Oren Lavie
- "I Stay Away" by Alice in Chains
- "In Your Arms" by Kina Grannis
- "Is That It" by Katrina & The Waves
- "Lame Claim to Fame" by "Weird Al" Yankovic
- "Last Dance" by George Clinton
- "Les Tartines" by Sttellla
- "Long Gone" by Fat City Reprise
- "Ma Che Discorsi" by Daniele Silvestri
- "Now You See Her" by Crash Test Dummies
- "Paralyzed" by The Used
- "Point of No Return" by Nu Shooz
- "Rhythm of Love" by Yes
- "Road to Nowhere" by Talking Heads
- "Sex Machine" by The Fat Boys
- "Shopping Trolley" by Beth Orton
- "Sledgehammer" by Peter Gabriel
- "Strawberry Swing" by Coldplay
- "There There" by Radiohead
- "Time Won't Let Me Go" by The Bravery
- "Vermilion" by Slipknot
- "Betty" by AJR

Quebec band Les Colocs and Michel Gondry used pixilation in many of their music videos.

Of note, "Leave Me Alone" by Michael Jackson utilises a variation on this technique by slowing down the frame rate of video and overlaying objects to achieve the distinctive pixilation look to great effect.

== Others ==
The pixilation technique was also used for the opening of Claymation, Will Vinton's 1978, 17-minute documentary about his animation studio's production techniques, the first time the famous trademarked Claymation term was used, now a term synonymous with all clay animation.

The Czech animator Jan Švankmajer uses pixilation in most of his work; most notably Food.

Jan Kounen's Gisele Kerozene (1989), a short film that shows witches riding around a city on broomsticks, is another influential example of this technique.

Pixilation is also used in Andrew Huang's short video Fluxis.

An effect similar to pixilation can be achieved by dropping occasional frames from a conventionally recorded movie. While obviously easier than the stop-motion technique, this does not achieve the same quality.
