= Bolexbrothers =

British animation studio

bolexbrothers (alternatively Bolex Brothers) was an independent British animation studio founded by Dave Borthwick and Dave Alex Riddett in Bristol, UK. The studio specialised in stop motion and pixilation animation, producing numerous short films and commercials, as well as two feature films, The Secret Adventures of Tom Thumb (1993) and The Magic Roundabout (2005). The studio was named after the Bolex brand of 16mm cameras once popular with animators and was first established as a collective of artists in the 1980s before becoming a company in 1991 and running to roughly 2008.

The studio's films were often dark and surrealistic, described by Borthwick as presenting “a reality that's just slightly sideways”. Their films often employed experimental or uncommon animation techniques such as pixilation (posing and shooting live actors frame-by-frame).

== Filmography ==
Feature films

- The Secret Adventures of Tom Thumb (1993) - Dir. Dave Borthwick
- The Magic Roundabout (2005) - Dir. Dave Borthwick
- Grass Roots (Unfinished) - Dir. Dave Borthwick

Short films

- The Biz (1994) - Dir. Darren Walsh
- The Saint Inspector - (1996) Dir. Mike Booth
- Keep in a Dry Place and Away From Children (1997) - Dir. Martin Rhys Davies
- Little Dark Poet (1999) - Dir. Mike Booth
- Tastes Like Tuna (2000) - Dir. Mike Booth
- How Do You Feel (2001) - Dir. Paul B Davies
- The Day of the Subgenius (2001) - Dir. Chris Hopewell

Commercials

- Nestea - Closed (2000)
- Lender's Bagels - Aroma (1999)
- Budweiser - Pick Me Up (1999)
- Chupa Chups - The Jungle (1998)
- Chupa Chups - Barcode (1998)
- Nestea - Kwikimart (1998)
- Scotland Against Drugs - Animates (1998)
- Lego - Canteen (1997)
- Carlsberg - Snowman (1997)
- Fanta - The Colour of Friendship (1994)
- Fanta - Big and Orange (1994)

Music videos

- Lost at Sea - Startled Insects
- Igors Horn - Startled Insects
- Grass Grow -
- Creatures - Startled Insects
- Vikings Go Pumping - Loggerheads
