= ShortsTV =

Television channel devoted to short films

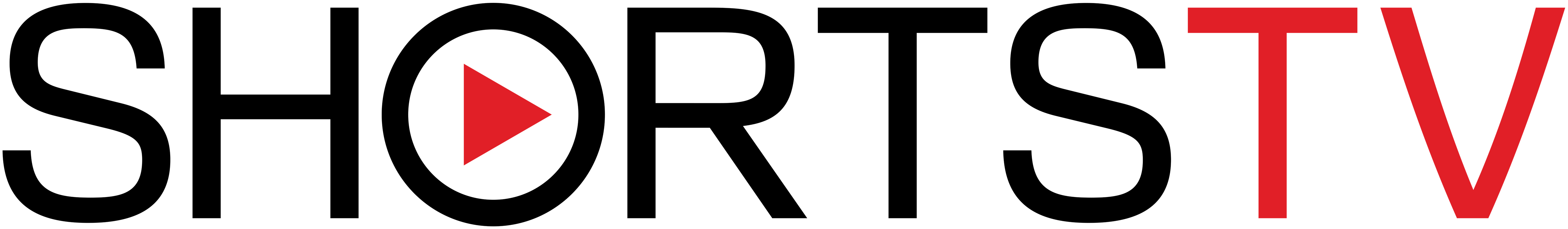
- Country: United Kingdom
- Broadcast area: United States; EMEA; Asia; Latin America
- Headquarters: London, England

Programming
- Picture format: 1080i HDTV (downscaled to 16:9 576i for the SDTV feed)

Ownership
- Owner: Shorts International (75%); AMC Networks International (25%)
- Key people: Carter Pilcher

Links
- Website: shorts.tv (English)

ShortsTV is an international television network and streaming service dedicated to short films. ShortsTV has over 13,000 titles in its catalog and has been a presenter of the Oscar Nominated Short Film releases since 2006.

The channel is available in over 100 million homes across the U.S., India, Latin America, Europe and more. It is offered across the US on DirecTV (channel 573), AT&T U-Verse (channel 1789), AT&T TV (Channel 573), AT&T TV NOW, Frontier Communications (channel 789), Google Fiber (channel 603) and Hotwire (channel 560). ShortsTV is also offered in the UK, Netherlands, Italy and Spain on Amazon Prime Video Channels and on demand through iTunes in 92 countries, Amazon Instant Video (UK, US and Germany), Google Play (US and Canada), and Verizon and Frontier (US).

ShortsTV is owned by Shorts International Ltd which is headquartered in London, England and is represented in the United States by Shorts Entertainment Networks, a wholly owned subsidiary located in Los Angeles. The company is led by Chief Executive Carter Pilcher and is majority owned by Shorts Entertainment Holdings with AMC Networks, a significant minority shareholder.

== Oscar Nominated Short Film Theatrical Distribution ==
Every year, ShortsTV presents the Oscar nominated shorts in theaters and virtual cinemas internationally. The program grossed over $3 million in 2018. The offerings have three separate packages, one each for Best Animated Short, Best Live Action Short, and Best Documentary Short, with five films included in each.

In 2020, the three-compilation showcase of the Oscar Nominated Short Films opened on January 31 in more than 460 screens across the US and Canada, up from 270 screens in 2019; it earned over $1.1 million in weekend box office receipts.

== OTT Offerings ==
In February 2021, ShortsTV launched its proprietary OTT Service Delivery Platform with Airtel Xstream to offer the ShortsTV video-on-demand service to Airtel’s 340 million subscribers in India to watch on mobiles or TVs. The platform was designed for short form viewing behaviour.

In July 2021, Shorts International and Samsung Electronics announced “Shorts” and “Cortos”, free-to-view advertising supported film channels which are available on the Samsung TV Plus service, initially in the UK, Italy and Spain. The free-to-view channels, Shorts (Channel 4512 in the UK and Italy) and Cortos (Channel 4512 in Spain) will be fully localized and tailored to each market, featuring some international films available from ShortsTV.

== TVCortos ==
TVCortos, ShortsTV’s Spanish language sister channel, programs Spanish short films and short series and is distributed in Latin America and Spain. In July 2020, ShortsTV announced an initiative to put film festivals on air amidst in-person cancellations and postponements, many of which were featured on TVCortos. Highlighted festivals included Guanajuato International Film Festival (GIFF), Shorts Mexico, FACIUNI Becas, Bogoshorts, CINELEBU.

== India Offerings ==
In India, ShortsTV is available as a linear value-added service (VAS) on Tata Play (Channel 113), Airtel Digital TV (Channel 259), Dish TV (Channel 135) and d2h (Channel 135).

== Filmmaker & Festival Partnerships ==
In January 2020, ShortsTV announced a licensing deal with AFI Conservatory which brought 100 short films made by filmmakers who participated in the AFI Conservatory’s educational programs to the ShortsTV channel.

In September 2020, ShortsTV struck a licensing deal with multimedia production company Iwerks & Co. to add a selection of short documentaries to the linear and OTT channel.

In November 2020, ShortsTV acquired exclusive one-year distribution rights to a collection of short documentary films commissioned by Mastercard, known as the “Mastercard FIVE”. The series, commissioned by Mastercard in association with ShortsTV, follows five women from five countries who have turned their passions into mission-driven businesses.

In June 2021, ShortsTV announced a deal with SeriesFest to present “Best of SeriesFest”, which will curate five pilots airing June 24 to July 11 on ShortsTV’s networks and coincide with SeriesFest season seven. The event is part of a three-year licensing agreement between ShortTV and SeriesFest.

== ShortsTV Worldwide Film Festival ==
ShortsTV launched the ShortsTV Worldwide Film Festival, a film festival and awards ceremony that will highlight short films from the U.S., Europe, Latin America and India.
