= The Wizard of Speed and Time =

1979 and 1988 films by Mike Jittlov

- Directed by: Mike Jittlov
- Written by: Mike Jittlov
- Produced by: Richard Kaye
- Starring: Mike Jittlov; Paige Moore; Richard Kaye; Deven Chierighino; Steve Brodie; John Massari; Gary Schwartz; Frank LaLoggia; Philip Michael Thomas; Paulette Breen; Will Ryan; Stephen Stucker
- Cinematography: Russell Carpenter
- Edited by: Mike Jittlov
- Music by: John Massari
- Distributed by: Shapiro-Glickenhaus Entertainment
- Release dates: May 13, 1988 (Cannes); September 22, 1989 (US)
- Running time: 95 min
- Language: English
- Budget: $1,535,000 (estimated)

The Wizard of Speed and Time is a 1988 American feature film written, directed by, and starring animator Mike Jittlov. It was preceded by a 1979 short film of the same name, also by Jittlov.

== 1979 short film ==
In the original short film, a young man in a green wizard robe runs across America at super speed. Along the way, he gives a hitchhiking woman (Toni Handcock) a swift lift to Hollywood and gives golden stars to other women who want a trip themselves. He slips on a banana peel and comically crashes into a film stage, which he brings to life in magical ways.

Jittlov is a special effects technician, and he produced all of the special effects in the film himself, many through stop motion animation.

This short film was shown as a segment of an episode of Disney's Wonderful World. The episode, titled "Major Effects", aired in 1979 to coincide with the release of Disney's feature film The Black Hole. The film segment went on to be shown at science fiction conventions around the country.

== 1988 feature film ==
As the short film gained wider exposure, Jittlov began work on a feature-length 35mm film based on it. He made the film independently, as he didn't want to compromise his artistic vision (as would've been the case with a studio production). It stars Jittlov as a fictionalized version of himself: a special effects "wizard" trying to fulfill his dream of making a full-length movie.

The film remakes and expands the "Wizard Run" sequence of the original short, and incorporates material from some of his other short films (such as Time Tripper and Animato). Jittlov sprinkled subliminal messages throughout the film, using words associated with positivity and fulfillment.

In the film, Hollywood director Lucky Straeker (Steve Brodie) and producer Harvey Bookman (played by the film's producer Richard Kaye), bet over whether Jittlov can actually complete a major effects assignment, and Bookman does everything in his power to thwart him. Kaye's 16-year-old daughter Lauri Kaye became the film's production secretary and performed in the film as a voice-over artist and a hand model. Cameos in the film include science fiction and film industry personalities Forrest J. Ackerman, Angelique Pettyjohn, Ward Kimball, Will Ryan, and a pre-Miami Vice Philip Michael Thomas, as well as composer John Massari. The poster for the film was done by sci-fi genre artist Kelly Freas, who included a number of subliminals in it.

The feature was filmed from 1983 to 1986, had a small theatrical release in 1989, and was later released on VHS and LaserDisc.

== Legacy ==
In the November 2019 Marvel comic book series Loki, issue 5, the title character states that The Wizard of Speed and Time is his favorite film.
