= F.O.O.D. (album) =

Studio album by Danny!
- Released: May 17, 2005
- Recorded: February–April 2005
- Genre: Hip hop
- Length: 72:00
- Label: Badenov Records/1911 Music
- Producer: Danny!

Danny! chronology
| The College Kicked-Out (2004) | F.O.O.D. (2005) | Charm (2006) |

F.O.O.D. is the second full-length studio album by American rapper/producer Danny!, released under his 1911 Music/Badenov Records imprint in 2005. The acronym "F.O.O.D." stands for "Finding Out Our Destination" and, despite the depiction in the cover art, the album's content has nothing to do with any actual food or food-related themes (unlike MF Doom's second album, Mm..Food).

The restaurant shown on the cover of F.O.O.D. is Bobbie's Diner, a 1950s-themed cafe owned by the Savannah College of Art & Design where Danny! was once a student.

== Overview ==
The album, which was pressed up in limited quantities, was significant for officially introducing the wise-ass/sarcastic and cynical persona of Danny!, now known by the alternative moniker and alter ego "D. Swain". This was largely in part due to the mixed criticism Danny! received for his debut album, The College Kicked-Out. The jaded producer/MC took the feedback personally, openly lashing out on his critics throughout F.O.O.D. It was this, along with constant usage of self-deprecating lyrics that bordered on autophobia and smacked of depression, that made F.O.O.D. a far darker and more emotionally charged LP than its predecessor.

F.O.O.D. saw a swift progression from the sound and style predominant on The College Kicked-Out. Though still heavily relying on samples Danny experimented with different methods this time, even going as far as to scratch vocals into his songs with a turntable in a style reminiscent of DJ Premier. Employing new techniques to further disguise his sample usage signaled his maturation as a producer and gave him more acclaim within the hip-hop community.

Danny!'s lyrics—which balanced topics from his indecisiveness and pseudoskepticism to social commentary about black America—were seen as an improvement over those found on his previous album. Presumably, the extra insight offered in his rhymes as well as the manner in which they were delivered was an effort to appease critics who deemed his prior efforts as "amateurish" compared to Danny!'s peers. However, many of Danny!'s lyrics on F.O.O.D. also contained a substantial amount of profanity and even chronicled graphic recounts of Danny!'s sexual exploits, making The College Kicked-Out relatively inoffensive in comparison.

Though publicity photos for F.O.O.D. included images of various dishes and entrées, the album itself did not cover food-related topics. Above, the tray card art portrays F.O.O.D.'s track listing as a restaurant bill stub.

=== Reception ===
Professional ratings
Review scores
| Source | Rating |
|---|---|
| Allmusic | 3.5/5 stars |

F.O.O.D. was released in May 2005 to little fanfare, in contrast to the widespread attention given to Danny!'s previous LP. Though the initial response was mostly positive, feelings were undoubtedly mixed. While many agreed that the record was a sonic improvement, both lyrically and musically, over The College Kicked-Out, listeners were turned off by the amount of cursing and explicit sexual content. Critics believed Danny! was trying to "wear a suit that [doesn't] fit", implying that the role of foulmouthed cynic was not in context with the persona initially displayed on Danny!'s debut album.

Supporters of Danny! appreciated the new direction but overall everyone, including Danny! himself, felt that he took past criticism to heart and devoted far too much time addressing detractors and naysayers. Aside from the retaliatory songs, the record was praised for its vivid, sometimes satirical narratives, more personal glimpses into the rapper's life, and even the brief optimism Danny! showed toward the end of the record. Allmusic recognized Danny! as "a storyteller...and a pretty good one, too".

Unfortunately, F.O.O.D. didn't do much to help Danny! make a significant dent in the underground hip-hop community, and buzz for the album subsided shortly after its release.

== Track listing ==
| No. | Title | Music | Sample(s) | Length |
|---|---|---|---|---|
| 1. | "Intro" (Swain, Gaye, Riperton, Rudolph) | Produced by Danny! | Contains samples from "Don't Let Anyone Bring You Down", by Minnie Riperton and "Here My Dear", by Marvin Gaye. | 3:20 |
| 2. | "F.O.O.D." (Swain, Griffin, Moore, Perren) | Produced by Danny! | Contains elements from "Poor Charlotte", by the Miracles. | 4:02 |
| 3. | "I'm Back" (Swain, Armstead, Ashford, Simpson) | Produced by Danny! | Contains elements from "Cry Like A Baby", by Aretha Franklin. | 3:43 |
| 4. | "It Changes" (Swain, Sherman, Sherman) | Produced by Danny! | Contains elements from "It Changes", by Chad Webber. | 4:00 |
| 5. | "I Only Wanna Be With You" (featuring Ms. Lisha) (Swain, Webb) | Produced by Danny! | Contains samples from "Didn't We", by Irene Reid. | 4:50 |
| 6. | "So All Alone" (Swain, Lloyd, Oliver, Osmond, Osmond) | Produced by Danny! | Contains samples from "I'm Dyin'", by Donny Osmond. | 3:50 |
| 7. | "Prove Myself" (Swain, Sylvers) | Produced by Danny! | Contains samples from "I Don't Need To Prove Myself", by The Sylvers. | 3:22 |
| 8. | "Regrets" (Swain, Lennon, McCartney) | Produced by Danny! | Contains samples from "Your Mother Should Know", by The Beatles. | 3:05 |
| 9. | "My Whole World" (Swain, Crutcher, Jones) | Produced by Danny! | Contains samples from "My Whole World Is Falling Down", by William Bell. | 4:00 |
| 10. | "Mind's Made Up" (Swain, Addrisi, Addrisi) | Produced by Danny! | Contains samples from "I Believe You", by Cleo Laine. | 4:37 |
| 11. | "So Tired (remix)" (Swain, Davis, Perry) | Produced by Danny! | Contains samples from "Love Got Me Tired (But I Ain't Tired of Love)", by Greg Perry. | 4:35 |
| 12. | "V.I.P." (Swain, Lennon, McCartney) | Produced by Danny! | Contains elements from "Eleanor Rigby", by the Beatles. | 4:05 |
| 13. | "The Lesson" (Swain, Mann, Spector, Weil) | Produced by Danny! | Contains samples from "Lovin' Feeling", by The Charmels. | 3:13 |
| 14. | "Where Is The Love" (Swain, Bala, Long, Moy) | Produced by Danny! | Contains elements from "And This Is Love", by Gladys Knight & the Pips and "Fly Away", by Sons and Daughters of Lite. | 3:11 |
| 15. | "What She Said" (Swain, Page, Perren, Yarian) | Produced by Danny! | Contains elements from "A Little Piece of Heaven", by The Miracles. | 2:41 |
| 16. | "Goodbye" (Swain, Sylvers) | Produced by Danny! | Contains samples from "Don't Give Up The Good Life", by the Sylvers and "Don't Let Me Lose This Dream", by Aretha Franklin . | 4:40 |
| 17. | "We Gon' Make It" (Swain, Sylvers) | Produced by Danny! | Contains samples from "We Can Make It If We Try", by the Sylvers. | 5:52 |

UK Bonus Tracks
| No. | Title | Sample(s) | Length |
|---|---|---|---|
| 18. | "Fullaschidt" (featuring 'Drea) (Swain, Kahn, Styne) | Contains samples from "A Beautiful Friendship", by Esther Phillips. | 2:58 |

== Personnel ==
- Danny! – Executive Producer, Producer, Composer, Featured Vocals
- Steve Slavich – Engineer
- Andrea Boutte – Featured Vocals
- Shalisha North – Featured Vocals

== Release history ==
| Country | Date |
|---|---|
| United States | May 17, 2005 |
| United Kingdom | May 25, 2005 |
