= Lou Bunin =

American puppeteer and stop-motion animator

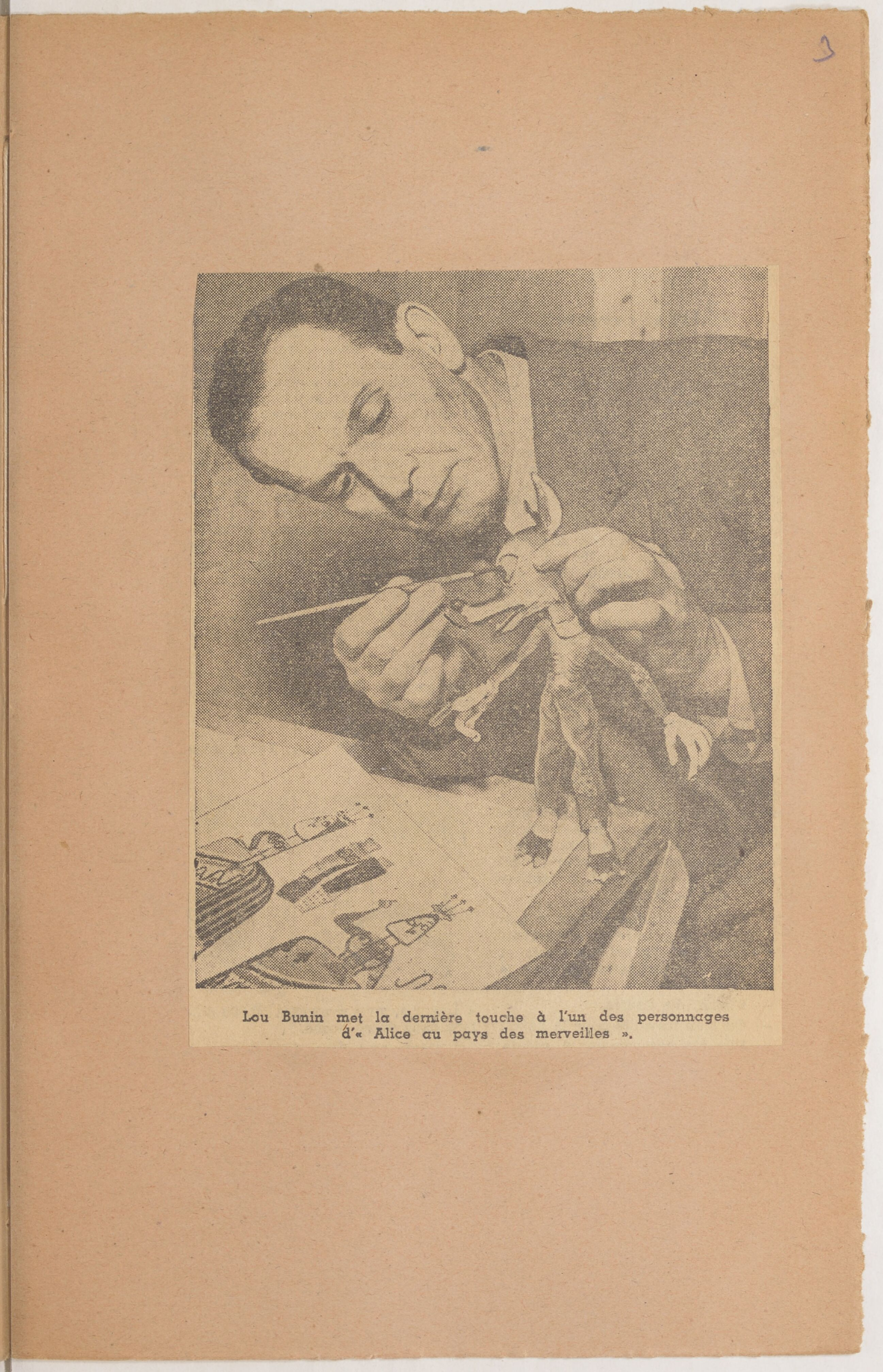

Louis Bunin (28 March 1904 – 17 February 1994) was an American puppeteer, artist, and pioneer of stop-motion animation best known for his 1949 adaptation of Alice in Wonderland.

== Early works ==
While working as a mural artist under Diego Rivera in Mexico City in 1926, Bunin created political puppet shows using marionettes including a production of Eugene O'Neill's The Hairy Ape. Photographer Tina Modotti took many pictures of Bunin and his puppets, including her renowned work, "The Hands of the Puppeteer".

== Career ==
On his return to the United States, Bunin created animated three-dimensional puppets to appear in the 1939 New York World's Fair in New York City. His 1943 political stop-motion satire, Bury the Axis, is well known. Later Bunin landed a job with Metro-Goldwyn-Mayer where he created the stop-motion Prologue to the famed film, Ziegfeld Follies. He was subsequently fired as a casualty of McCarthyism.

== Alice in Wonderland (1949) ==
Bunin went on to create a feature-length stop-motion animation film adaptation of Alice in Wonderland in 1949, starring Carol Marsh as a live-action Alice. A lawsuit from Walt Disney prevented it from being widely released in the U.S., so that it would not compete with Disney's forthcoming 1951 animated version. Further, the film was kept out of Britain as his representation of the Queen of Hearts was seen as too close and too unkind to Queen Victoria. The film was restored with 12 additional minutes and shown at museums around the US, including the Museum of Modern Art in New York City.

== Death ==
Creator of the popular Talking Utica Club Beer Mugs and a plethora of memorable short films, Bunin died of a stroke on 17 February 1994 at age 89 in Englewood, New Jersey, USA.
