= Fresh Guacamole =

2012 American film

- Poster
- Directed by: PES
- Written by: PES
- Produced by: PES
- Distributed by: Showtime; ShortsHD
- Release date: 2012
- Running time: 1 minute, 40 seconds long
- Country: United States

Fresh Guacamole is a 2012 American animated short film written and directed by PES (Adam Pesapane). The film was nominated for Best Animated Short Film at the 85th Academy Awards; at 1 minute and 40 seconds, it is the shortest film ever nominated for an Oscar.

== Distribution ==
After being nominated for an Academy Award, the film was released along with all the other 15 Oscar-nominated short films in theaters by ShortsHD.

== Plot ==
The film uses the technique of pixilation and shows a man's hands (the hands are from PES himself) making guacamole out of familiar objects, which become different items whenever they are cut, often depending on (unspoken) puns. For example, a baseball is cut in half and then becomes a pile of dice while it is being diced. Each of the objects also resembles an ingredient actually used in an authentic guacamole recipe - a grenade with a maroon number 7 billiard ball pit resembles an avocado and pit respectively, a baseball resembles an onion, a red pincushion resembles a tomato, a green miniature golf ball with a Trivial Pursuit game piece interior resembles a lime, a green Christmas light bulb (which is chopped into Monopoly game pieces/houses) resembles a jalapeño pepper, and king and queen chess pieces resemble salt & pepper shakers. The end result is "fresh guacamole" served with a side of "poker chips".

== Accolades ==
Accolades received by Elvis (2022 film)
Award	Date of Ceremony	Category	Recipient(s)	Result	Ref.
Annecy International Animation Film Festival	2012	The Annecy Cristal	PES	Nominated	
Academy Award	February 24, 2013	Best Animated Short Film	PES	Nominated	

== See also ==
- 2012 in film
- Independent animation
