= Bury the Axis =

1943 British film

Bury The Axis
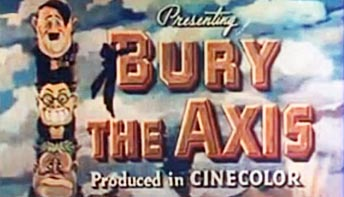
- Title screen
- Directed by: Lou Bunin
- Animation by: Arthur Turkisher; Lou Bunin
- Color process: Cinecolor
- Release date: February 3, 1943
- Running time: 6 minutes
- Country: United Kingdom
- Language: English

Bury the Axis a 1943 stop-motion animated short directed and animated by American Lou Bunin, a famous and successful puppeteer who had worked in Hollywood previously, was released by Paramount Pictures on February 3, 1943. It was part of a British plan to showcase the enemies of Britain as truly evil in the eyes of the public in order to continue the war effort. Kenneth Clark, as head of the Films Division of the Ministry of information that was re-established at the start of the war, argued in 1940 that the public must be convinced of German brutality, stating 'we should emphasise wherever possible the wickedness and evil perpetrated in the occupied countries' Though very little research and historiography has been produced on Bury the Axis, it is often remembered by historians and film and animation researchers as being 'memorable'

== Background ==
During the Second World War, much propaganda was created, each with its own aim. British propaganda's intentions throughout the war varied, though focused mainly on boosting morale on the home front and increasing/maintaining a dislike for the enemies of Britain. Bury the Axis is an example of a British propaganda cartoon created to maintain a dislike for the enemy.

== Plot ==
The animation begins with a stork flying and carrying a baby wrapped in white cloth. The Stork proceeds to smell the baby and finds the smell revolting. The stork then drops the defenceless baby, who falls through a roof and lands in the floor. The building through which the baby falls have written on it 'Schicklgruber' which is the surname of Hitler's grandmother Maria Schicklgruber and the birth name of his father, Alois Hitler. Upon landing, the baby immediately draws a gun before firing it at the stork, and then transforms instantly into an adult Adolf Hitler. The narrator then stating 'and so Adolf was born'. Hitler's first action is to blow his nose into a swastika flag handkerchief to a few notes of Ride of the Valkyries.

Hitler begins goose-marching from nation to nation while singing. In this song, Hitler starts with how he overthrew democracy in Germany, joined by four goose-stepping geese, each wearing a military hat or helmet. He then sings, "Then I goose-step across the Rhine, march right through the Maginot Line," and, marching into France adds, "I hire as henchmen, Some 5th Column Frenchmen" and kicks away a goose wearing a Philippe Petain general's hat. As he continues through Holland and Norway he is accompanied by a single goose, but after marching into Russia he returns almost immediately with bandages and bruises, and no goose, saying, "I think maybe my goose was cooked in Moscow." He then whistles and Benito Mussolini appears out of a dog kennel.

Mussolini proceeds to sing a song as Hitler did, though Mussolini's is largely about being Hitler's dog, stating that 'I'm only a boarder in Hitler's new order'. Mussolini is seen wearing a Swastika.

The scene cuts to Emperor Hirohito, the Japanese Emperor at the time, who initially appears as a snake. He emerges from behind a tree singing to faux Japanese music that "A son of the sun am I, When born I was dropped from the sky," and when stating how people bow to him family, bows, revealing a blade hidden behind his back. He proceeds to lay on the ground, while kicking a bomb into the air, finishing his song with "When we bomb you on Sunday, We sorry on Monday, We only bomb people for fun."

Following the three Axis powers individual scenes, the animation then shows Hitler, Mussolini and Hirohito in a battleship of a tank, with the narrator stating "the three lugs got together"' and that "when their neighbours weren't looking, they Blitzkrieg'd em". The narrator continues to state that 'They took over all of Europe' and want to take over 'the whole world'.

The animation then cuts to a hill where the narrator predicts that the United Nations of: China, Great Britain, the Soviet Union and The United States will 'bury the axis'. Following this is a skirmish between the Allied forces and the Axis. During the skirmish, Hitler, Mussolini and Hirohito are still in the tank. Mussolini and Hirohito are the ones loading the shells and firing, while Hitler simply screams orders at the two of them. The shot that is fired simply droops out of the gun and splats onto the ground. Following this, the allies on the hill then fire a shell which has written on the side of it 'Adolf'. This shot destroys the tank and leaves the trio looking humiliated. The Allies fire off two more shots at Hitler, Hirohito and Mussolini; each one completely debilitating the trio and leaving them left in a humiliating position. The animation then ends with the still screen that reads "The End".

== Cinematography ==
The film uses stop-motion animation in order to portray its story. This includes wax and latex models of Hitler, Mussolini and Hirohito.
