= 2015 in American television =

In American television in 2015, notable events included television show debuts, finales, and cancellations; channel launches, closures, and rebrandings; stations changing or adding their network affiliations; and information about controversies and carriage disputes.

== Events ==
=== January ===
Date	Event	Source
1	Stations owned and operated by Cordillera Communications (10 in seven states) are removed from DirecTV lineups after the two companies fail to reach a retransmission agreement.	
3	The Carolina Panthers defeat the Arizona Cardinals in the first NFL playoff game to air on cable. The ESPN broadcast is simulcast over-the-air in Phoenix on KASW and Charlotte's WJZY per NFL rules.	
3	Fox News Channel's Huckabee concludes its run, ending amid speculation that the show's titular host, former Arkansas governor Mike Huckabee, was considering a run for political office. The speculation would come to fruition on May 5, when Huckabee announces his candidacy for US President in 2016.	
5	At the Consumer Electronics Show in Las Vegas, Dish Network introduces Sling TV, a service that offers streaming of cable channels via the Internet for as little as $20. Networks owned by The Walt Disney Company (ABC Family, Disney Channel, ESPN, ESPN2), Time Warner's Turner Broadcasting System (Adult Swim/Cartoon Network, CNN, TBS, TNT) and Scripps Networks Interactive (Food Network, HGTV, Travel Channel) are among those included in the lineup.	
12	Ohio State defeats Oregon in the first College Football Playoff National Championship. ESPN's broadcast of the game attracts 33.4 million viewers, which is the largest audience in cable television history and tops the previous records set by ESPN's broadcasts of the CFP semi-finals on January 1, when OSU beat Alabama in the Sugar Bowl (28.27 million viewers) and UO beat Florida State in the Rose Bowl (28.16 million viewers).	
13	Nearly three years after being removed from her role as Today co-host, Ann Curry announces she is leaving NBC News altogether to develop a new company that will deliver news content to various platforms, including NBCUniversal, who will fund the startup.	
13	ABC affiliate KDNL-TV/St. Louis debuts a locally originated news programming for the first time in a year with The Allman Report; hosted by KFTK talk radio host and former KMOV reporter Jamie Allman. The newscasts, airing twice nightly (5 pm and 10 pm), will employ a non-traditional, "debate-driven" format, according to KDNL.	
14	TVGN, the CBS/Lions Gate-owned entertainment network, rebrands as Pop.	
15	Discovery Fit & Health rebrands as Discovery Life Channel.	
15	KCRG/Cedar Rapids, eastern Iowa's ABC affiliate owned locally by The Gazette Company, is removed from DirecTV in the region due to a retransmission dispute.	
17	On four separate occasions, Fox News Channel offers retractions on inaccurate reports made throughout the week regarding Muslims in Europe, primarily locations in England and France avoided by non-Muslims because Islamic law supposedly supersedes the local laws. "There is no formal designation of these zones in either country, and no credible information to support the assertion there are specific areas in these countries that exclude individuals based solely on their religion", anchor Julie Banderas said during one of the on-air apologies. Paris mayor Anne Hidalgo later announced her intention to sue the network because her city was "insulted" by being mentioned as one with "no-go zones."	
17	Greg Anthony, lead college basketball analyst for CBS Sports and Turner Sports, is placed on indefinite suspension by both entities following his January 16 arrest in Washington, D.C., on charges of soliciting prostitution.	
18	CBS and the National Football League announce that the network will again produce for the full season and carry half of the NFL Network's Thursday Night Football rights package on the CBS broadcast network in a simulcast arrangement during the 2015 NFL season.	
19	TV Guide pays tribute to those lost in the January 7 terror attack at the Paris, France offices of Charlie Hebdo with the inclusion of the "Je suis Charlie" button (French for "I am Charlie") next to its logo on the front cover.	
19	Boomerang is relaunched as part of a global rebranding effort and will air original programming for the first time; the relaunched channel will still have archived programs but with an increased emphasis on the archive's most popular brands and an explicitly family-friendly approach, in the hopes that Boomerang can become a "second flagship" on par with the main Cartoon Network channel.	
20	Justice Network makes its debut. The digital subchannel, launching primarily on Gannett Broadcasting-owned stations, focuses on true crime and criminal justice programming.	
21	Educational Media Foundation announces a video streaming service based around its K-Love Christian contemporary music radio format and brand.	
23	During the 6 p.m. newscast on WTVD/Durham, anchor Larry Stogner announces he has Amyotrophic lateral sclerosis and is leaving the ABC owned-and-operated station where he had worked since 1976.	
25	The 63rd edition of the Miss Universe pageant is held at the FIU Arena at Florida International University in Miami with contestants representing 88 countries and territories around the world and broadcast on NBC and Telemundo. Originally scheduled to be held in 2014, it was confirmed by the Miss Universe Organization via a tweet by Doral, Florida, mayor Luigi Boria on Twitter that the pageant would be held on January 18, 2015 (a week prior to the broadcast), leading to some controversy among pageant fans and resulting it to be slipped into 2015, making it the first time that the pageant skipped a year. Paulina Vega of Colombia wins the title.	
26	Music Choice and Cumulus Media launch a video-on-demand subdivision for Cumulus's Nash FM radio branding called Nash TV.	
26	ABC affiliate KAIT in Jonesboro, Arkansas, begins broadcasting NBC on its DT2 subchannel, giving the Jonesboro market its first locally based NBC affiliate.	
28	VH1 Classic commemorates Saturday Night Live's 40th anniversary by launching a marathon of almost every episode from SNL's first 39 seasons in reverse order, running through February 15, when NBC will air its three-hour SNL celebration special. At 19 days (or 433 hours), the marathon will surpass by one week FXX's 12-day record marathon of The Simpsons episodes in August 2014.	

=== February ===
Date	Event	Source
1	NBC's broadcast of Super Bowl XLIX, in which the New England Patriots beat the defending NFL champion Seattle Seahawks, attracts 114.4 million viewers, topping by 2.2 million the previous record set one year earlier by Super Bowl XLVIII. The broadcast peaks at 120.8 million late in the close game. The game's halftime show, headlined by Katy Perry and guest performers Lenny Kravitz and Missy Elliott, also sets a viewership record.	
1	Coinciding with its Spanish language broadcast of Super Bowl XLIX, NBCUniversal-owned mun2 rebrands as NBC Universo.	
1	A house fire near its transmitter substation is the believed contributor to three separate signal outages at WPSD-TV/Paducah, Kentucky, during its broadcast of the Super Bowl.	
2	Pro Football Hall of Fame defensive lineman Warren Sapp is removed from his role as commentator for NFL Network, hours after his arrest on charges of soliciting prostitution and assault in Phoenix, Arizona, following the Super Bowl, which Sapp covered for the network.	
2	Inside Edition becomes the first American news program to employ a transgender reporter, adding Zoey Tur (the former "Chopper Bob" Tur) to their reporting staff for February.	
2–5	One night after a special live Sunday night broadcast from Phoenix (to coincide with NBC's Super Bowl coverage), The Tonight Show Starring Jimmy Fallon begins a four-day stay at Universal Studios Hollywood, marking the New York-based Tonight's first visit to the Los Angeles area since Fallon took over hosting duties from Jay Leno one year earlier. Tonight had been based in Burbank for 42 years until Leno's retirement from the show. The shows include a reunion of the cast of Saved by the Bell (excluding Dustin Diamond and Lark Voorhies), who reprised their roles for a brief sketch, their first time in 21 years.	
4	Raycom Media NBC affiliate KCBD/Lubbock, Texas, evacuates their studios after a small plane crashes into the station's tower which is located on the same campus as their studio facilities, taking down half the transmitting tower and the station off the air in the process. Power lines were also damaged in the crash, and one person, a local doctor listed as a co-owner of the aircraft, was killed in the crash.	
4	NBC Nightly News anchor Brian Williams apologizes for incorrectly stating on numerous occasions that he had been aboard a helicopter shot down by enemy fire while covering the Invasion of Iraq in 2003. In his statement during this evening's broadcast, Williams admitted that he had instead been in a following helicopter and his version of the story was an attempt to show his appreciation for veterans. NBC launches an investigation into the matter, meanwhile stories Williams had told regarding what he witnessed during Hurricane Katrina in 2005 further call his credibility into question. On February 7, Williams announced that he will step aside as anchor until the investigation is completed. Lester Holt will take Williams' place until his return. He also cancels a February 12 appearance on Late Show with David Letterman, itself a subject of controversy because of a 2013 appearance by Williams in which he mentioned the events that he is under fire for. On February 10, NBC News released a statement which confirms Williams' suspension from the network without pay for six months.	
6	Just five months after returning as a co-host, Rosie O'Donnell announces that she will leave The View due to personal problems. Her last day on the show was February 13.	
6	American Dad celebrates its 10th anniversary.	
8	The 57th Annual Grammy Awards air on CBS. The event saw British singer Sam Smith taking home four awards, Kristen Wiig joining Maddie Ziegler in a performance of Sia's "Chandelier" (thanks to Wiig's parody of the song's video on Saturday Night Live), and Kanye West almost ruining Beck's speech after he won for Best Album. The event featured a serious PSA message from President Barack Obama, in which he spoke about domestic violence against women, and was followed by a plea from domestic violence advocate Brooke Axtell and singer Katy Perry performing her ballad "By the Grace of God" as a dedication to the victims of the crime.	
10	San Diego CBS affiliate KFMB-TV's Sports Director Kyle Kraska is hospitalized after he is shot twice near his home. The suspect, a housepainter Kraska had a dispute with, is captured hours later.	
11	Victoria Rowell, former star of The Young and the Restless (created by William J. Bell and Lee Phillip Bell, who also create The Bold and the Beautiful), sues CBS and Sony Pictures Television on charges of racial discrimination after she spoke out about a lack of African Americans on soap operas, which led to her contract not being renewed.	
11	Just two weeks before its scheduled premiere, ten of the thirteen episodes of the third season of Netflix's thriller series House of Cards were released for streaming. Within minutes the episodes were taken down.	
13	Home shopping channel ShopHQ, the former ShopNBC, rebrands for the second time in a matter of years, becoming EVINE Live.	
15	NBC celebrated Saturday Night Live's 40th anniversary with a live four and a half-hour event that included a red carpet pre-show followed by a live three and half-hour show featuring more than 109 guest stars, a first ever mash-up of classic sketches, a SNL Weekend Update gathering of former anchors Jane Curtin, Tina Fey and Amy Poehler, and for the first time since leaving the series in 1985, Eddie Murphy made his brief return. This special became NBC's most-watched prime-time entertainment telecast since the ER season finale in 2004.	
16	ESPN confirms its coverage of the Duke-North Carolina men's basketball game two days later will not include commentator Dick Vitale for the first time in the network's 35-year history. Jay Bilas will take his role alongside Dan Shulman, while Vitale works a game between the undefeated Kentucky Wildcats and Tennessee Volunteers.	
18	Vanilla Ice is arrested in Lantana, Florida, for burglary and theft tied to items that were stolen from a home that was located next door to a home he was renovating during an episode of his DIY Network program The Vanilla Ice Project.	
18	Just two days after appearing on the Saturday Night Live 40th Anniversary Special, Norm Macdonald reveals through a series of tweets that Eddie Murphy backed out of the Celebrity Jeopardy sketch because he felt uncomfortable impersonating Bill Cosby (whom Murphy had done during his stint with SNL), resulting in Kenan Thompson replacing Murphy at the last moment. Cosby would later tweet his thanks to Murphy for not doing the impersonation.	
19	For the first time since the death of her mother Joan in 2014, Melissa Rivers returns to the front of the camera as a correspondent for Entertainment Tonight, where she will do special interviews for the series while continuing as producer on E!'s Fashion Police.	
19	A report by Mother Jones challenges claims made by Bill O'Reilly about his reporting on the Falklands War for CBS News in 1982, particularly that he had to rescue his cameraman from unrest in the streets of Buenos Aires after Argentina surrendered to the United Kingdom, and that several deaths occurred during the post-war protest. O'Reilly later denounces the report and its author, David Corn, on The O'Reilly Factor. Meanwhile, Eric Engberg, who also covered the Falklands conflict for CBS, posted on Facebook that he knew nothing of a cameraman being injured in Buenos Aires or that the protest had even gotten out of hand. Further allegations that O'Reilly fabricated stories surface in the following days, with claims that he did not witness the suicide of George de Mohrenschildt or the execution of nuns in El Salvador as he has stated in the past.	
19	In response to the death of actress Carol Ann Susi in November 2014, her recurring character on The Big Bang Theory, Debbie Wolowitz, dies as well, with the main characters toasting her in the final scene of this night's episode.	
19	Two and a Half Men broadcasts its last episode on CBS, Of Course He's Dead.	
22	The 87th Academy Awards air on ABC, hosted by Neil Patrick Harris.	
23	Back9Network temporarily suspends operations due to lack of funding.	
23	Weigel Broadcasting takes over the programming operations of WGWG-LP/Chicago and renames it WRME-LP, a television station on Channel 6 using the 87.7 FM audio quirk to broadcast over FM, under a leasing deal with owners Venture Technologies. The station programs an Oldies/AC format billed as "MeTV FM."	
24	ESPN suspends Keith Olbermann for a week after offering contentious responses on Twitter towards Penn State students, faculty and alumni regarding the university's annual "THON" fund-raising dance marathon held to fight pediatric cancer, telling them that the school were "pitiful" (referring to filling in the end of the school's well-known "We Are...Penn State!" slogan/chant with that statement) in holding the event. Olbermann later apologized for his actions. His commentary upon the return to his daily series on March 2 offers further apologies for his actions and the mentions of St. Jude's Children's Hospital and the Make A Wish Foundation to contribute to ending pediatric cancer, along with his end of "batting practice", where he offered up short and brusque responses to critics and trolls responding to him on Twitter.	
24	Giuliana Rancic issues an apology to K.C. Undercover actress/singer Zendaya after Rancic made comments about Zendaya's dreadlock-braided hairstyle during the post-Oscar special edition of Fashion Police. The incident causes co-host Kelly Osbourne to threaten quitting the series via her Twitter account (her departure is confirmed by E! on February 27).	
28	A Saturday Night Live commercial spoof on an ad for Toyota (which depicted a female United States Army soldier being dropped off at the airport by her father), stirs up outrage from viewers over its depiction of a female high school graduate (played by guest host Dakota Johnson) who leaves her family to join ISIS, with the father (played by Taran Killam) replying "Death To America" after instructing one of the militants (played by Kyle Mooney) to watch over her.	

=== March ===
Date	Event	Source
2	CBS Television Distribution and Judge Judith Sheindlin extend their contract for her courtroom show Judge Judy for three seasons, adding to her current contract (which was set to expire after the 2016–17 season), meaning it will be on the air until at least the spring of 2020. The new contract also includes a second season renewal for her executive-produced judge panel show Hot Bench.	
3	Oprah Winfrey announces that Harpo Productions will be folded into her OWN cable channel, which will result in the closing of Harpo Studios, the Chicago facility where The Oprah Winfrey Show taped from 1990 to its end in 2011. OWN's original shows will begin taping at their West Hollywood studios starting in 2016.	
4	An episode of TBS' Conan features segments in which host Conan O'Brien visits Havana, Cuba. It is the first time an American late-night series has filmed in Cuba since Jack Paar interviewed Fidel Castro on The Tonight Show in 1959.	
8	Simpsons co-creator Sam Simon dies at the age of 59 from colon cancer	
10	For the second time in 13 months, The Weather Channel is removed by a major television provider. Verizon FiOS dropped TWC and sister network Weatherscan at 12:00 am. Eastern Time (replaced by AccuWeather Network, which launched on that date, as well as a widget with weather content provided by WeatherBug), after the two parties were unable to come to terms on a new carriage agreement. Verizon (downplaying claims that the removal resulted from a carriage dispute between it and TWC) cited consumer use of the internet and mobile apps to receive weather forecasts as the reason behind the removal. In response, The Weather Channel released a statement citing its live, real-time coverage of severe weather events as an integral part of its programming, and urged FiOS subscribers to urge the provider to restore the channel.	
12	Dr. Nancy Snyderman leaves NBC News as a result of controversy stemming after she was caught violating the terms of a self-imposed quarantine after being potentially exposed to the Ebola virus, in which she was spotted outside the restricted area in New Jersey in October 2014, a precaution she and other staffers took after an NBC News freelance cameraman contracted the disease while Snyderman and a team were in Liberia.	
12	Univision fires Rodner Figueroa (a fashion correspondent and co-host of the Spanish-language network's entertainment newsmagazine Sal y Pimienta) after remarking on the previous day's edition of El Gordo y la Flaca that Michelle Obama looked "like she's part of the cast of Planet of the Apes" while the First Lady's image was shown side by side with that of Paolo Ballesteros (who became popular earlier in the year for his transformations into various female celebrities) during a live segment about the make-up artist. In a statement, Figueroa stated the comment was not meant to be racist, instead a reference to the job Ballesteros had done to make himself into Mrs. Obama, and claimed he was let go after The White House complained to Univision, a claim that a Univision executive denied.	
12	After appearing in only seven shows, Kathy Griffin announces that she has decided to leave E!'s Fashion Police, citing that her brand of humor was not the perfect fit for the program and that she did not want to duplicate the formula of her best friend and predecessor Joan Rivers. On March 17, E! announced that it was placing Fashion Police on hiatus until September.	
14	One night before a HBO documentary series, The Jinx, airs its final episode, the subject of that show, Robert Durst, is arrested in New Orleans as part of the investigation of the 2000 death of family friend Susan Berman, which is profiled in the series along with two other deaths, including the unsolved disappearance and murder of Durst's wife. Though Durst has maintained his innocence, The Jinx's finale features audio of Durst (recorded following an interview for the series while Durst's microphone was still turned on) that appears to implicate himself in the deaths.	
23	The National Football League announces a suspension of its decades-long blackout policy, allowing games that do not sell out in the 2015 season to air in the game site's market.	
23	The FCC levies a $325,000 fine against CBS affiliate WDBJ/Roanoke, Virginia, for airing sexually explicit material outside of the designated safe harbor period (between 10:00 p.m. and 6:00 am). The fine, the largest ever against a television station for a one-time instance of indecent content, was for a July 2012 report opening a 6:00 p.m. newscast about a former porn actress who became a volunteer EMT for a Roanoke area rescue squad; the report featured a brief image from an adult website showing the subject of the report (who was neither nude nor engaged in a sexual act), which featured a video clip of a hand stroking a penis that seemed to be in the safe area of the editing suite while the story was being packaged, but was visible on-screen when actually broadcast. WDBJ's owner Schurz Communications plans to challenge the fine, contending the images were fleeting (only three seconds in length) and small enough to not be visible for many viewers.	
23	After three months of guest hosts in the wake of Craig Ferguson's departure from The Late Late Show, James Corden takes over as the CBS late-night talk show's permanent new host. Tom Hanks and Mila Kunis are Corden's inaugural guests.	

=== April ===
Date	Event	Source
1	E. W. Scripps Company and Journal Communications consummate the concurring mergers of their respective media properties, with Journal's television and radio assets (with the exception of Fox affiliate KNIN-TV/Caldwell, Idaho, and radio station KFTI-FM/Wichita, Kansas, which were sold to other companies) becoming part of the Cincinnati-based Scripps' existing broadcasting portfolio (Scripps' print assets were transferred to a separate company, the Milwaukee-based Journal Media Group, which includes the pre-merger Journal's existing newspaper and magazine properties).	
1	As part of the show's annual April Fool's Day gag, Bob Barker hosts the first segment of The Price Is Right. Barker, who hosted the show from 1972 to 2007, ceded hosting duties to current host Drew Carey for the remainder of the show.	
2	Just three days after it was announced that the project had begun production, Will Ferrell announced that a Lifetime movie that he and producer Gary Sanchez had been working on, A Deadly Adoption, was scrapped after details of the project were leaked to the press. Rumored to be an April Fools' Day prank, a teaser would be unveiled on June 11; the actual movie aired on June 20. The television film stars Ferrell and Kristen Wiig as a couple whose plans to adopt a young woman's unborn child takes a tragic turn, which coincided with Lifetime's 25th anniversary of producing original made-for-cable movies (the story reportedly includes tongue-in-cheek nods to classic Lifetime movies).	
2	The Price Is Right model Manuela Arbeláez accidentally unveiled the winning prize in one of the Pricing Game segment Five Price Tags and awarded a $21,960 Hyundai Sonata to a contestant. Her resulting blooper has since gone viral in social media and on YouTube.	
2	In Wheel of Fortune, contestant Whitney Shields became the first contestant in history to lose the $1,000,000 prize after failing to solve "Without a Doubt", since the $1,000,000 top prize was introduced back in 2008. Consequently, the loss prevented Shields from setting a new record of $1,041,892 (which could've surpass Autumn Erhard's $1,030,340 from May 30, 2013, episode).	
3	Two Los Angeles-based talent agencies, United Talent Agency and Creative Artists Agency, take their dispute that resulted in UTA luring away 10 talent representatives and their clients (including television actresses Mindy Kaling and Melissa McCarthy) to court, as CAA files a lawsuit accusing UTA of enlisting two CAA agents to help induce their fellow employees to terminate their employment with CAA so they can join UTA, citing a breach of contract and a deliberate attempt to interfere with CAA's relationship with its clients.	
6	ABC affiliate WICD/Champaign, Illinois, discontinued its weeknight 6:00 and 10:00 p.m. newscasts, replacing them with simulcasts from Springfield sister station WICS (both are owned by Sinclair Broadcast Group, with WICD serving as a semi-satellite of WICS), that would feature news coverage focused on the entire Springfield-Champaign-Decatur market. Although WICD will no longer carry its own newscasts, the station will simultaneously begin producing an hour-long 9:00 p.m. newscast for Fox-affiliated sister station WCCU-TV, that will be separate from an existing prime time newscast on that station's Springfield-based parent WRSP-TV (both operated by Sinclair through GOCOM Media).	
6	CBS televised the 2015 NCAA Men's Division I Basketball Championship Game, in which the Duke Blue Devils defeated the Wisconsin Badgers in Indianapolis. The 2015 Championship Game marked the end of a 34-year streak of consecutive telecasts of the game for CBS Sports. The 2016 edition, as part of a deal between CBS and Turner that began in 2011, will be on TBS. Through 2024, subsequent championship games in even-numbered years are scheduled to be on TBS, with CBS retaining the game in odd-numbered years.	
7	Coinciding with the fifth-season premiere of Game of Thrones airing five days later on April 12, HBO launches HBO Now, an over-the-top subscription video on demand service featuring original programming and feature film content from the Time Warner-owned premium channel. The service, which does not require a subscription to the linear HBO channel through a conventional pay television provider (differing from the similar TV Everywhere service HBO Go), was initially made available for purchase through Apple (which unveiled the service at a press event on March 9) and Cablevision's Optimum TV service.	
8	A series of DirecTV advertisements featuring actor and spokesperson Rob Lowe as himself and various alter-egos is removed as planned for a new campaign featuring model Hannah Davis, but not before the National Advertising Division, following up on a complaint made by Comcast, finds DirecTV's claims about customer satisfaction, quality and ranking in the Lowe series of ads are not true.	
13	Citing his film and primetime TV workload, Terry Crews announces he will step down as Who Wants to Be a Millionaire host after one season. Chris Harrison will succeed Crews in September.	
13	WCIA/Champaign anchor Dave Benton announces he will leave the position to continue his treatment for terminal brain cancer, which he first disclosed to viewers in September 2014. Benton later died on May 26 at the age of 52.	
15	The digital subchannel network Laff commences programming. Owned by Katz Broadcasting and consisting of sitcoms and comedic films, Laff launches primarily on stations owned by ABC and E. W. Scripps Company.	
16	ESPN suspends reporter Britt McHenry for one week after an incident that was caught on video in which she berated a towing company employee after her car was towed from a lot in suburban Washington, D.C. The video featured McHenry using profanity and insults towards the woman who was about to tow the car. McHenry has since apologized for her actions.	
17	The syndicated morning program The Daily Buzz is abruptly canceled without notice after a 12 1/2-year run. Based in Orlando and airing mainly on independent or CW- or MyNetworkTV-affiliated stations, Buzz's demise comes after a financial backer of the show's producers, Mojo Brands Media, pulls their funding for the company.	
18	Fox Sports announces the addition of Pete Rose to its Major League Baseball broadcasting team as a guest analyst, over 25 years after the all-time leader in hits (with 4,259) received a lifetime ban from the sport for betting on games while managing the Cincinnati Reds.	
20	Netflix announces it has ordered 13 episodes of an original series titled Fuller House, which will be a sequel of Full House, with several members of the original cast reprising their roles.	
23	Just one year after announcing what would have become the largest cable operator in the United States, only to face increasing opposition from federal regulators, members of the U.S. House and Senate, and media watchdog groups, Comcast withdraws its plans to acquire Time Warner Cable, whose deal would have faced more scrutiny after regulators were to take the companies' proposed plans that were called into question to a judge before a decision could have been made.	
23	Hours after the news was leaked out in the upcoming edition of Entertainment Weekly to some subscribers of the magazine who receive it early, Patrick Dempsey confirmed that his character on Grey's Anatomy, Derek Shepherd, will die from a car accident and his wife Meredith Grey (Ellen Pompeo) will take him off life support in the episode "How to Save a Life", which aired on this date. The news also coincides with Dempsey's decision to leave the series after eleven seasons despite having signed on for a 12th.	
23	Gray Television reaches a deal to purchase WAGM-TV, the CBS and Fox affiliate in Presque Isle, Maine, from NEPSK for $10.25 million.	
24	In a two-hour 20/20 interview with ABC's Diane Sawyer that attracts nearly 17 million viewers, Bruce Jenner confirms nearly 2 years of speculation (after his divorce from third wife Kris Jenner) that he identifies as and has started transitioning to a woman, the last interview Jenner will do as a male during the transition. On April 25, E! announces that an eight-part documentary-reality series (I Am Cait) that will follow the now-rechristened Caitlyn Jenner's life as a transgender person will debut July 26.	
26	The 42nd Daytime Emmy Awards ceremonies are held, with The Young and the Restless and Days of Our Lives sharing Outstanding Drama Series honors, the 2nd time in history two dramas shared the honor. The ceremony airs on Pop, marking a return to conventional TV for the Daytime Emmys (the 2014 ceremony aired online-only).	
27	ESPN sues Verizon for breach of contract after they "unbundled" its channels by placing them into a different package than previously agreed upon.	
27	Local media outlets in the Baltimore market and the major cable news outlets air live coverage of the riots that breaks out hours after the funeral of Freddie Gray, a 25-year-old male who died of suspicious spinal cord and neck injuries while in police custody after being arrested for possession of what was suspected to be an illegal knife that later turned out was legal under Maryland state law, which lead to six Baltimore Police Department officers being placed on paid suspension (and were later charged with second degree murder and manslaughter charges upon review of an investigation), which forces the move of network primetime to digital subchannels on WMAR, WBAL, WJZ and WBFF for breaking news coverage. At least 34 people were arrested, and 15 officers were injured. The riots also results in the postponement of two Chicago White Sox–Baltimore Orioles games to a May 28 doubleheader (the first due to safety concerns, the second additionally due to an additional 10 pm. ET curfew), with a third on April 29 being played during the day in an empty stadium setting at Oriole Park at Camden Yards, though still televised in the Baltimore and Chicago markets, a first ever in Major League Baseball's 145-year history.	
29	The Baltimore Orioles defeat the Chicago White Sox 8–2 in a game played without fans due to the Baltimore riots following the death of Freddie Gray.	

=== May ===
Date	Event	Source
1	Citing "the new realities of television viewing and philanthropic giving," the Muscular Dystrophy Association announces it will no longer produce its annual telethon, concentrating instead on digital and mobile fundraising platforms. Famously hosted through 2010 by Jerry Lewis, the MDA telethon had aired each Labor Day weekend since 1966.	
2	For the first time since 2002, Showtime and HBO team up to co-produce a pay-per-view boxing broadcast, Floyd Mayweather's 12-round unanimous decision over Manny Pacquiao in Las Vegas (the fighters are under separate contracts with the broadcasters, Mayweather with Showtime, Pacquiao with HBO). Highly anticipated and financially lucrative (the HD broadcast cost $99.95), the start of the fight is delayed by about 45 minutes as last-minute buys overwhelm cable and satellite systems.	
5	A&E announces it is pulling the reality series 8 Minutes from its schedule with no plans to air three remaining episodes from its first season, effectively cancelling the show. Producers of the series, in which pastor and former police officer Kevin Brown sets up sessions with prostitutes only to use the time to persuade them to abandon the profession, had received withering criticism in features by On the Media and BuzzFeed for failing to follow up with the show's subjects or provide them with promised services.	
6	KTMF/Missoula news director Kalee Scolatti and a family acquaintance are shot and killed in an incident at Scolatti's home. The assailant, later identified as Scolatti's estranged husband, Nicholas, turns the gun on himself and dies in a Missoula hospital on May 8.	
7	MyNetworkTV affiliate KLAF-LD in Lafayette, Louisiana, announces it will become an NBC affiliate on July 1, giving the Lafayette market its first NBC affiliate since 1975 (when KLNI shut down). Prior to the announcement, cable systems in the market imported KPLC from Lake Charles, KALB-TV from Alexandria, and/or sister station WVLA-TV from Baton Rouge for NBC programming. It is also announced KLAF-LD's former affiliation with MyNetworkTV will move to a new DT3 subchannel of sister station and Fox affiliate KADN-TV on the same date.	
12	At an upfront presentation held at Lincoln Center, NBCUniversal Hispanic Group announces the formation of NBC Deportes, a sports division that will produce event, analysis and magazine content for Spanish-language networks Telemundo (whose Deportes Telemundo unit was restructured into the new division) and NBC Universo. The unit will be headed by NBC Sports Group chairman Mark Lazarus.	
13	Hearst Television announces its intentions to sell Hawaii ABC affiliate KITV/Honolulu and its satellites (KHVO/Hilo and KMAU/Wailuku) to SJL Broadcast Management. The purchase marks the return of SJL to Hawaii. As Montecito Broadcast Group, the company formerly owned KHON-TV from 2006 until 2007.	
13	Just two days after Fox announces that the show's 15th season in 2016 will be its last, Nick Fradiani is crowned the 14th season winner of American Idol.	
13	Harry Shearer announces he will depart from the voice cast of The Simpsons due to a contract dispute. The dispute would be resolved by July 7, when Fox announces Shearer had accepted a new 2-year deal (with the same terms as his fellow cast members) to remain with the show and continue to provide the voice of Ned Flanders, Mr. Burns, and several other notable characters.	
15–18	For the first time since its inception in 1963, ABC's soap opera General Hospital airs live episodes for two days (Friday, May 15 and Monday, May 18), becoming the first American daytime soap opera to do so in 40 years since As the World Turns and The Edge of Night, both of which were transitioned to being taped from live broadcasts.	
17	During a telecast of This Week, host George Stephanopoulos admitted to having contributed to the Clinton Foundation after reports surfaced that he failed to disclose a $75,000 contribution he made to the organization, leading to a conflict of interest that arose after he interviewed Peter Schweizer, the author of "Clinton Cash", which detailed allegations and conflicts involving Clinton Foundation donors, during an April 26 broadcast. As a result of the revelation and admission, Stephanopoulos removed himself from moderating the Republican presidential primary debate in February. ABC has a policy that bars reporters from contributing to political groups, except for charities, such as the Clinton Foundation.	
17	The 2015 Billboard Music Awards (which premiered the TV cut of Taylor Swift's music video for "Bad Blood" at the start of the broadcast) breaks its own record for having the most viewers tuning in with 11.1 million, a jump of 6% from the 2014 telecast (its highest since the 2003 telecast) and 4% overall among its annual broadcast in its 14-year history.	
17	Tom Bergeron ends his run as host of America's Funniest Home Videos after fifteen seasons (the longest hosting tenure to date in the 25-year history of the ABC series). The 25th-season finale, which was taped at Disneyland as part of the show's annual "Grand Prize Spectacular", closed with Bergeron being carted off the set by original host Bob Saget. On May 19 (formally announced during an appearance on the season finale of Dancing with the Stars, which Bergeron will continue to host), Alfonso Ribeiro was named the new host of AFV, starting with the 26th season in September.	
18	The ABC reality dating series The Bachelorette opens its 11th season with two female contestants (both of whom competed in season 19 of parent series The Bachelor) vying to become the sole courter of 25 male participants. In the second episode of the two-part premiere (on May 19), Kaitlyn Bristowe was named the season's sole Bachelorette over Britt Nilsson in a majority vote by 24 of the suitors (a 25th was eliminated prior to the vote announcement due to alcohol-induced inappropriate conduct with Bristowe and some of the male contestants). This marked the first such selection by vote in the history of the series and the second in the Bachelor franchise overall (Byron Velvick was selected over Jay Overby by contestant vote in season 6 of The Bachelor).	
19	Rumer Willis is crowned the 20th season winner of Dancing with the Stars.	
20	Gray Television announces that it plans to acquire KOSA-TV, the CBS affiliate in Odessa, Texas, from Investment Company of America for $33.6 million.	
20	With retrospective clip packages, cameo appearances by former presidents George H. W. Bush, Bill Clinton and George W. Bush plus incumbent Barack Obama, a Top Ten List read by frequent guests (among them the previous night's guest, Bill Murray), and a closing performance by Foo Fighters, David Letterman hosts CBS' Late Show for the final time, retiring after a record 33 years as a late night host (22 at Late Show, 11 before that at NBC's Late Night).	
21	TLC suspends broadcasts of the series 19 Kids and Counting in the wake of revelations against Josh Duggar, the oldest child of the 19-child family. The revelations allege that Duggar, as a teenager, engaged in unspecified inappropriate acts of incest with his sisters and others; he would later also be outed as an adulterer after his account on Ashley Madison was exposed in the Ashley Madison data breach. The Duggar family and TLC mutually agree to end the series permanently on July 16.	
21	The American version of Red Nose Day makes its inaugural debut. The charity event, organized by Comic Relief, Inc. and broadcast on NBC featuring performances, sketches, features and appeal films from various celebrities and music artists, raised over $21 million to help lift children and young people out of poverty. It also became the most social charity special of the 2014–15 season with more than 149,000 tweets and set a viewership record of 3.194 million overall.	
22	CBS reveals that copies of Supergirl's pilot episode were leaked to unauthorized and pirated websites ahead of the series' November debut. An estimated 192,000 illegal downloads took place, mainly from the United States, the United Kingdom, and Australia.	
25	After a four-month "soft launch" of series marathons for early affiliates, Decades makes its formal debut. A digital subchannel network co-owned by CBS Television Stations and Weigel Broadcasting, Decades features classic TV shows and movies as well as original content, highlighting on a particular year or decade each day.	
26	One month after Comcast ends its purchase attempt of Time Warner Cable, Charter Communications announces it will purchase TWC in a $56.7 billion deal, pending FCC approval. Charter would also continue its plan to acquire Bright House Networks, which is controlled by the Time Warner/Advance Newhouse Partnership, in a separate deal. In relation to its TWC deal, Charter announced plans to offer TWC-owned SportsNet LA, the Los Angeles Dodgers' exclusive TV home, to its existing customers in Southern California. It had been available only to TWC customers, as Charter and other pay television providers had previously balked at TWC's per-subscriber fee for the channel.	
29	Live Well Network, a lifestyle digital subchannel network owned by ABC Owned Television Stations which had ended most operations on April 15, ends all national distribution, as Media General removes the network from their stations at the close of business on this day, though it continues to air in markets with an ABC owned-and-operated station.	
31	Bob Schieffer moderates Face the Nation for the final time, retiring after a 24-year run as the CBS News program's host and a 46-year tenure with the network. John Dickerson became Face's host on June 7.	

=== June ===
Date	Event	Source
1	Buzzr debuts as a digital subchannel network, airing primarily on Fox-owned stations. Owned by FremantleMedia and based on the YouTube channel of the same name, the network features content from Fremantle's library of classic game shows (including the extensive Goodson–Todman Productions library that had previously served as the core of the Game Show Network lineup).	
1	TBN Salsa, a faith-based, family-oriented digital subchannel network targeting English-speaking Hispanics, launches. Owned by the Trinity Broadcasting Network, TBN Salsa replaced either JUCE TV or Smile of a Child TV on the third or fifth subchannel, depending on the market, of TBN's 38 stations. The latter two networks were combined into a single subchannel over-the-air, with Smile airing a reduced lineup of programming in the mornings and early-afternoons, though both services will maintain separate 24-hour schedules via TBN's streaming services on its website, along with the network's mobile and digital media player apps.	
1	KJNB-LD in Walnut Ridge, Arkansas, signs on the air as an affiliate of Fox, giving the Jonesboro market its first locally based Fox affiliate. Despite being licensed as a low-powered television station, Waypoint Media, the owners of KJNB-LD, secured the affiliation agreement with Fox by promising to provide coverage of at least 93% of the market through its over-the-air signal and through distribution on local cable and satellite providers.	
3	After five seasons as a regular, Kim Richards departs the Bravo reality series The Real Housewives of Beverly Hills to seek rehabilitation for alcoholism. Although she would no longer serve as a full-time cast member, conflicting reports suggest the possibility of Richards making special appearances in future episodes.	
3	In a Wall Street Journal report, Dish Network is stated to be in negotiations to merge with mobile telephone provider T-Mobile. Under the terms of the proposed deal, Dish chief executive officer Charlie Ergen would be named chairman of the combined company, with T-Mobile CEO John Legere as its CEO.	
4	In an interview on The Howard Stern Show, Jason Alexander makes a surprise admission: While he was a regular on Seinfeld in the 1990s, he, along with co-stars Jerry Seinfeld and Julia Louis-Dreyfus, were behind the idea to have his character George Costanza's fiancée Susan Ross (played by Heidi Swedberg) killed off because he felt the chemistry between the main cast and Swedberg did not work well on camera. Alexander and the former cast would later apologize to Swedberg after making that comment saying she was a great person to work with.	
6	The 2015 FIFA Women's World Cup commences play. The tournament, which runs through July 5, is the first senior-level FIFA tournament broadcast by Fox Sports, the U.S. English-language rightsholders to the tournament, which will carry games on Fox, Fox Sports 1 and Fox Sports 2; NBCUniversal-owned Telemundo and NBC Universo handles Spanish-language television broadcasts.	
6	The majority of the cast of the 2000–2007 WB/CW series Gilmore Girls, along with series creator Amy Sherman-Palladino and her husband Daniel reunite for the first time in eight years to take part in a sold-out panel discussion of the series at the Paramount Theatre in Austin, Texas, as part of the ATX Television Festival. A chair is left empty in honor of Gilmore patriarch Edward Herrmann, who had been the first to state his intention to attend the reunion, but died on December 31, 2014, of brain cancer.	
7	True crime channel Investigation Discovery airs its first ever scripted production with the mini-series Serial Thriller: Angel of Decay which chronicled the investigation of convicted serial killer Ted Bundy. The channel would produce a second installment titled Serial Thriller: The Chameleon about suspected serial killer Elaine Parent, which aired in December.	
8	The R&A announces a new U.S. broadcast deal with NBC and Golf Channel to carry The Open Championship, one of the four men's major golf championships. The new deal was set to begin in 2017, but by October 2015, NBC reaches a deal with the R&A and ESPN to take over coverage in 2016, the last year of ESPN's current deal to carry The Open. The arrangements mean ESPN's relationship with The Open ends with the final round of the 2015 Open on July 20. ESPN and/or sister network ABC had carried The Open since 1962.	
9	During an interview with ABC affiliate KXLY-TV/Spokane in which they were doing an investigation into her claims of harassment and her ethnic background, Rachel Dolezal, the president of the Spokane Chapter of the NAACP, is confronted and questioned by reporter Jeff Humphrey about whether she was actually African-American when the reporter showed her a picture of her parents, who are actually Caucasian along with a picture of her as a teenager albeit a different skin color; Dolezal immediately walks away afterwards. The interview eventually goes viral and Dolezal becomes the major topic on news programs, which results in her stepping down as NAACP president and being removed from a police ombudsman commission. Dolezal later appears on Today and MSNBC to discuss her racial identity, say that she identifies herself as a Black person.	
10	After three months of guest hosting, actress/singer Raven-Symoné is named a permanent co-host of ABC's The View, filling the fourth panel slot vacated four months earlier by Rosie O'Donnell.	
16	After decades of teasing the idea (attempting a run in 2000 and almost running in 2012), businessman and media figure Donald Trump announces he's running for president.	
18	Four months after Lester Holt was named interim weeknight anchor of NBC Nightly News in the wake of preceding anchor Brian Williams' suspension for his misrepresentation of certain events, NBC News makes the move permanent, with Holt assuming full-time weeknight duties effective June 22. Holt, who had previously anchored Nightly News' Saturday and Sunday editions from 2007 until Williams' suspension, becomes the first African-American to serve as the sole lead anchor of a weeknight network newscast. After his suspension ended in August, Williams' was reassigned to MSNBC where he serves as breaking news anchor.	
18–21	The 115th U.S. Open Golf Tournament airs on Fox and Fox Sports 1. The major tournament is the first U.S. Open ever carried by Fox Sports as part of a 12-year deal in which the sports division will hold the television rights to United States Golf Association championship events.	
19	Following a sold-out performance at the Minskoff Theatre in New York City, Neil Meron and Craig Zadan announced that "Bombshell", which was the fictional musical that was basis for the setting in the former NBC series Smash (for which they were the executive producers), would head to the Broadway stage as a real musical. Meron and Zadan are set to executive produce the Broadway production.	
24	The CBS reality series Big Brother begins its 17th season, with contestant Audrey Middleton becoming the first transgender contestant to appear on the U.S. version of the series (Nadia Almada – who also transitioned from male to female – was the first such contestant in the Big Brother franchise overall when she participated in the fifth season of the show's British version in 2004).	
25	Following comments about illegal immigrants from Mexico made by Donald Trump (who had previously stepped down as host of NBC's The Apprentice and was dropped by Fox News as a contributor shortly before his declaration) during his June 16 speech announcing his candidacy for the Republican Presidential nomination, Univision Communications terminates its contract with the Miss Universe Organization. NBCUniversal (which co-owned the Organization with Trump) and Mexico media conglomerate Televisa (which has a program-sharing agreement with Univision) later announced on June 29, that they would join Univision in severing business ties with Trump and terminate their contracts to televise Miss USA (cable channel Reelz later agreed to carry Miss USA 2015 on July 2, after initial confirmation by the Organization that it would be streamed via the pageant organizer's website) and Miss Universe. In protest of Trump's comments, hosts Cristián de la Fuente, Roselyn Sánchez (who were set to host the Spanish language simulcast for UniMás), Thomas Roberts and Cheryl Burke (who were set to host the NBC telecast); judges Emmitt Smith and Jonathan Scott; and scheduled musical performers J Balvin, Natalie La Rose, Craig Wayne Boyd and Flo Rida also withdrew from participating in the pageant. Trump and the Miss Universe Organization filed a breach of contract and defamation lawsuit against Univision Communications on June 30, seeking damages in excess of $500 million.	
26	Just moments after the Supreme Court of the United States handed down a 5–4 ruling that made same-sex marriages legal in the United States based on its decision in Obergefell v. Hodges, TV Guide updated its website and Facebook page to feature a modified logo, with "=" (the symbol for marriage equality) replacing "Guide" for one day.	
29	The Gannett Company formally separates its assets; the broadcasting and digital media assets are split off into Tegna Inc., which will handle the operations of the former company's 46 television stations (its name is derived as a partial anagram of its predecessor parent, which was restructured as a new, debt-free company that runs the "old" Gannett's publishing assets). With the split, Tegna also seeks to gain control of stations owned by Sander Media in markets with Gannett newspapers due to cross-ownership rules.	

=== July ===
Date	Event	Source
1	As part of a series of asset and license transactions, Gray Television acquires certain non-license assets of Fox affiliate WFXS-DT/Wausau, Wisconsin, and CBS affiliate KVTV/Laredo, Texas, from Davis Television, LLC and Eagle Creek Television respectively, migrating their programming to low-power stations WZAW-LD and KYLX-LP (Gray already owns CBS affiliate WSAW and NBC affiliate KGNS in the respective markets). Gray also sells NBC affiliates KTVH-DT/Helena, Montana, and its Great Falls satellite KBGF to Cordillera Communications, and donates the license assets of CW affiliate KMTF to Montana State University, which will integrate it as a member of its Montana PBS state network.	
1	Just 20 days after beginning to air repeats of The Dukes of Hazzard, TV Land immediately pulls the series from its schedule as a response to the Charleston church shooting on June 17 and the controversy surrounding the modern display of the Confederate flag (which is displayed on the rooftop of the 1969 Dodge Charger, known as the "General Lee", in the show). The shooter, Dylann Roof, had used the flag in his photos to display his plan to start a race war, thus igniting the controversy. One week prior, Warner Bros. Television and its co-owned consumer products division decided to stop production of products that featured the flag related to the series or franchise. CMT continues to air the series under the same syndication contract between Warner Bros. and Viacom which allows airing on most Viacom networks, including TV Land.	
2	Sonia Manzano announces that she will retire from Sesame Street after playing Maria Figueroa-Rodriguez since 1971.	
2	During a live remote broadcast in San Francisco about a fatal shooting the previous night, news crews members from NBC owned-and-operated station KNTV and Fox O&O KTVU are assaulted and robbed of their equipment. The three suspects, last seen driving away in a black BMW, are still at large.	
5	The live telecast of the 2015 FIFA Women's World Cup Final from Vancouver, British Columbia, Canada, which saw the United States defeat Japan 5–2 in their rematch of the 2011 final (in which Japan won in a shootout), shattered viewing records for a major soccer game in the United States, played by men or women. An estimated 25.4 million viewers watched the English-language broadcast on the Fox Broadcasting Company, while 1.3 million viewed the Spanish-language broadcast on Telemundo. The combined audience of 26.7 million viewers made the final the most-watched soccer game in American history.	
7	Showtime launches an over-the-top subscription video on demand service featuring a wide selection of original programming and feature film content, as well as live streams of the CBS Corporation-owned premium channel's linear East and West Coast television feeds. Like with pay television competitor HBO's OTT service HBO Now, the service does not require a subscription to the linear Showtime channel through a conventional pay television provider (differing from the similar TV Everywhere service Showtime Anytime). It was initially made available for purchase through Apple, Roku, PlayStation Vue and Hulu as well as through the channel's SHO.com website.	
7	Subway and its spokesman Jared Fogle mutually agree to part ways after the FBI raided his Zionsville, Indiana, home during a follow-up investigation regarding the arrest of the former head of his foundation, who was charged with possession of child pornography in April. Fogle pleaded guilty to possession of child pornography and having sex with a minor a month later.	
7	Just one day after a judge orders the release of documents from his 2005 lawsuit involving a sexual harassment case that revealed that Bill Cosby had admitted to acquiring Quaaludes in order to have sex with women by drugging them, two African-American focused networks immediately drop his sitcoms from their lineup, with cable channel Centric pulling repeats of The Cosby Show and the digital multicast network Bounce TV removing his 1996–2000 series Cosby from their schedules.	
7	After only one year as an online subscription video streaming service, The Sarah Palin Channel announced that it would be ceasing operations on August 1. Palin will offer the videos for free on her Facebook page and at her SarahPAC.com website.	
8	ESPN announces that Keith Olbermann will part ways with the network after two years due to a breakdown in negotiations to renew his contract, which expires July 31. ESPN rehired the veteran news and sports journalist in 2013 (as he was an anchor on SportsCenter from 1992 to 1997) to host the self-titled sports news/talk program Olbermann on ESPN2, only to see the struggling series constantly make changes, delaying the show for live events, reducing it from an hour-long format to a half-hour, and concerns over Olbermann's style of reporting and commentary. The final program aired on July 24.	
8	Epix 3, Epix's sister channel is renamed Epix Hits.	
9	E! announces that Giuliana Rancic will step down as co-host of E! News after 10 years, but will continue to serve as host of Fashion Police and Live from the Red Carpet specials at the network.	
15	For the first time in its 23-year history, the ESPY Awards, an exclusive to ESPN since its inaugural debut in 1993, moved to network television, where it aired on co-owned sister ABC. A rebroadcast later aired on ESPN, which aired the pre-show. The event – hosted by Joel McHale – saw Caitlyn Jenner become the first transgender athlete to receive an ESPY Award for expanding the sports world to the LGBT community, and a tribute to Stuart Scott, who died in January after suffering from cancer.	
15	Two of the three PBS member stations serving South Florida, WPBT/Miami (owned by Community Television Foundation of South Florida, Inc.) and WXEL-TV/Boynton Beach (owned by WXEL Public Broadcasting Corporation), announce an agreement to merge into a new entity to be known as "South Florida PBS", which would enable the two stations to pool resources and fundraising efforts to offer more programming content. Miami's other PBS member station, WLRN-TV, is exempt from the deal.	
19	GOCOM Media announces it will sell CBS affiliate KHSL-TV to USA Television Holdings, and K4 Media Holdings announces it will sell NBC affiliate KNVN to Maxair Media. Under the terms of the deal for the two Chico, California, stations, USA Television will assume the rights to an existing shared services agreement between KHSL and KNVN, in which it will provide certain non-programming, operational, technical and limited advertising services for KNVN on behalf of Maxair.	
22	At the end of the Syfy made-for-cable film Sharknado 3: Oh Hell No!, the last minute concluded with a cliffhanger regarding whether or not April Wexler (played by Tara Reid) is killed by falling wreckage. An ad after the film promotes a Twitter campaign offering fans the chance to decide her fate with the hashtags "#AprilLives" or "#AprilDies", with the results to be revealed in Sharknado 4. She ends up surviving.	
24	World Wrestling Entertainment officially releases Hulk Hogan from his contract, dropped as a judge on WWE Tough Enough, and removes products, merchandise, and related images (including his WWE Hall of Fame induction) from their website after additional footage from a 2012 sex tape surfaced in which he made racially charged rants that he would rather see his daughter Brooke date an African American, whom he suspected of dating at the time, as well as a separate comment involving Dwayne "The Rock" Johnson. Hogan has since apologized for his actions.	
24	The Federal Communications Commission approves the merger between AT&T and DirecTV, with attached conditions to address issues that may have potential negative effects on competition in the telecommunications industry (including requirements to expand its high-speed internet service to additional customers, eligible schools and libraries, and to offer broadband services to low-income households at discounted rates).	
24	ESPN officially terminates television and radio personality Colin Cowherd after he made negative comments about baseball players from the Dominican Republic on his radio program The Herd (a show simulcast on ESPNU), which was condemned by Major League Baseball and its players association. Cowherd had planned to leave ESPN after July 31 to join Fox Sports but the network decided to expedite his departure immediately.	
27	Actor Anthony Geary departs General Hospital, after having played the character of Luke Spencer on the ABC soap opera for 37 years, beginning in 1978.	
27	We Bare Bears premieres on Cartoon Network.	
28	With no advanced notice to its affiliates and a rebranding process still ongoing days after, Spanish-language broadcast network MundoFox rebrands as MundoMax. The change comes nearly two weeks after Fox International Channels divested its 50% interest in the network to Colombian broadcaster and network co-founder RCN Television on July 16, due to Fox and RCN's differing focuses in Spanish-language media (with Fox International wanting to focus on cable channels Fox Deportes, Nat Geo Mundo and Fox Life). The network has struggled since its August 2012 launch against competition from established competitors such as Univision and Telemundo, as well as a lack of higher-profile affiliates in key markets (with much of its affiliate body consisting of low-power stations and digital subchannels; Fox Television Stations carried the network only on a few of its owned-and-operated stations as third or fourth digital subchannels, mainly to simulcast a local affiliate to allow some kind of must carry cable carriage unavailable to the stations themselves in major markets). In addition to the rebrand, RCN abruptly shuts down MundoMax's news division, resulting in the layoffs of 35 of its 36 staffers; company representatives stated that news programming was "never part of the plan" for the network.	

=== August ===
Date	Event	Source
1	KJNB-LD, the Fox affiliate in Jonesboro, Arkansas, licensed to nearby Walnut Ridge, launches a DT2 subchannel carrying programming from CBS, giving the Jonesboro area its first full-time CBS affiliate. Waypoint Media, owners of KJNB-LD, also announce plans to acquire KJNE-LP from New Moon Communications (who had intended to make KJNE-LP an NBC affiliate until KAIT acquired that affiliation in January) and have it serve as a translator of KJNB-LD. With the move, the Jonesboro market now offers in-market affiliates of all four major commercial broadcast networks.	
3	Fourteen years after its original news department was shut down, WEVV-TV/Evansville, Indiana, relaunches news content with the debut of daily local newscasts on both its CBS-affiliated main channel and its Fox/MyNetworkTV-affiliated subchannel. The new news operation was formed by station owner Bayou City Broadcasting, which acquired WEVV in August 2014 (previous owner Communications Corporation of America, which shuttered WEVV's news department in 2001, divested the station to Bayou City as part of its sale to the Nexstar Broadcasting Group).	
3	Citing its lower-tier position in covering the tournament (resulting in airing matches in less-than-attractive early morning time slots), ESPN announces it will end its relationship with the French Open tennis tournament. The network had been a primary rights-holder or sub-licensee (from the Tennis Channel) of French Open telecasts since 2003. Tennis Channel and NBC will continue to air the event, with some matches possibly moving to NBCSN in 2016.	
3	Nineteen years after ending his stint as host of BET's Video Soul and after retiring from radio in 2010, Donnie Simpson signs a deal with Radio One to host a new music program that will air on its cable network TV One; he will also man an afternoon air shift at Radio One's WMMJ/Washington, D.C. as part of the multi-year deal.	
6	Fox News Channel aired the first of 12 scheduled Republican Presidential debates for the 2016 GOP nomination at Quicken Loans Arena in Cleveland, Ohio. It was seen by 24 million viewers, making the debate the most watched live broadcast in cable news history. Due to the number of candidates running for nomination, Fox News aired two separate debates, with the less popular candidates going first, followed by the top 10 candidates with more support in the 'prime time' debate. The event also ran into controversy and a war of words when Donald Trump slammed moderator Megyn Kelly after she asked Trump about his negative statements towards women in general and with Chris Wallace over his continued stance against illegal immigration.	
6	With cameos by former correspondents (plus former and future hosts Craig Kilborn and Trevor Noah), as well as a closing appearance by Bruce Springsteen and the E Street Band, Jon Stewart signs off after 16 1/2 years as host of The Daily Show.	
10	Raycom Media announces that it would purchase Drewry Communications Group – which includes the group's nine television stations: ABC affiliates KSWO-TV/Lawton, Oklahoma; KXXV-TV/Waco, Texas (and Bryan repeater KRHD-CD); CBS affiliate KFDA-TV/Amarillo, Texas; NBC affiliate KWES-TV/Midland, Texas (and Big Spring satellite KWAB-TV); and Telemundo affiliates KEYU/Amarillo, KTLE-LP/Odessa and KSCM-LP/Bryan, Texas – for $160 million. As part of the deal, Hoak Media will sell CBS affiliate KAUZ-TV/Wichita Falls, Texas, to American Spirit Media, under which it will be entered into a shared services agreement with Raycom upon the termination of a grandfathered joint sales agreement between KAUZ and KSWO.	
11	Cumulus Media's Nash TV expands with the launch of a television production division called Nash TV Films. Its first offering under this banner will be the documentary Walk Tall: The Journey of Sugarland's Kristian Bush, which is scheduled to air in syndication in September.	
13	HBO signs a five-year programming and development agreement with Sesame Workshop, granting the premium channel rights to much of the company's archive, along with the first-run broadcast rights to Sesame Street. A flagship program of both Sesame Workshop and public television, Sesame Street had aired exclusively on PBS or its predecessor NET since 1969. PBS will retain broadcast reruns of the half-hour version of Sesame Street, including episodes that air 9 months after their initial HBO broadcast. As part of its deal, HBO will also gain exclusive streaming rights to Sesame Street for its HBO Go and HBO Now services (assuming those rights from Amazon Video and Netflix). As a result, Sesame Workshop subsequently announces on August 14 that it would phase out in-house streaming service, Sesame Go, as a standalone subscription offering.	
23	17 days after signing off on the Daily Show, Jon Stewart is the host of WWE SummerSlam in which he interferes in the John Cena-Seth Rollins match for the WWE Heavyweight and United States Championship by striking Cena with a steel chair, allowing Rollins to execute a Pedigree for the win.	
24	Raycom Media's Cleveland duopoly of CBS affiliate WOIO/Shaker Heights and MyNetworkTV affiliate WUAB/Lorain implements a universal rebranding of their newscasts and imaging under the respective "Cleveland 19" and "CLE 43" brands. WOIO, which has been producing newscasts since 1995 via an arrangement with the existing news department of then-LMA partner WUAB (which becomes one of many MyNetworkTV affiliates that have stopped utilizing the programming service's branding), also shifts away from the tabloid-style Action News format introduced in 2002 under former news director Bill Applegate toward a more traditional news format with a continued emphasis on investigative journalism.	
24	One night after costing John Cena the WWE Heavyweight and United States Championship at SummerSlam, Jon Stewart is a guest on Raw in which he is AA'd by Cena.	
25	ESPN suspends Curt Schilling from his duties as analyst for its Little League World Series coverage following a tweet (which he subsequently deleted) attached with a picture which made a comparison between Muslim extremists and Nazis. The former Major League Baseball pitcher, who has also served as a color analyst on the network's Sunday Night Baseball telecasts since 2014, later apologized following extensive criticism, calling the move to post the photo a "dumb decision."	
25	129 stations owned and/or operated by Sinclair Broadcast Group, covering 79 markets in 36 states, are dropped from Dish Network due to an unresolved carriage dispute. The stations return to the satellite provider one day later, hours after FCC Chairman Tom Wheeler meets with both sides in an effort to resolve the dispute.	
25	ABC announces that Joy Behar will return as a panelist on The View, reportedly at the behest of the talk show's creator and executive producer (and original moderator) Barbara Walters. Behar previously served a panelist from The View's debut in 1997 until 2013. Behar will join fellow additions Candace Cameron Bure (who will balance her duties with her role as D.J. Tanner Fuller in the Netflix series Fuller House) and Good Morning America Weekend anchor Paula Faris, along with existing panelists Whoopi Goldberg, Michelle Collins and Raven-Symoné beginning in September, for its 19th season, which will also see the resumption of live episodes on Fridays.	
25	NBC announces that Alison Sweeney has decided to leave her role as host of The Biggest Loser after 13 seasons. Sweeney succeeded Caroline Rhea (the original host of the weight loss-focused reality competition series from its 2002 debut) as host in 2007, and had balanced her duties with her role as Sami Brady on the network's soap opera Days of Our Lives until 2014.	
26	In an incident that aired live on its morning newscast, WDBJ/Roanoke, Virginia, reporter Alison Parker and photographer Adam Ward were fatally shot while interviewing Moneta Chamber of Commerce director Vicki Gardner at a shopping/sports plaza in Moneta (Gardner was also shot and hospitalized with gunshot wounds to the back). The assailant, who died that afternoon at a local hospital (from a self-inflicted gunshot wound as he was approached by police), was Vester Flanigan II, who worked as a multimedia journalist at WDBJ (under the professional name Bryce Williams) from 2012 to 2013. Flanigan was briefly visible in footage of the on-air shooting after Ward dropped his camera, and later posted personal phone video of him shooting the three victims on his since-suspended Twitter account, along with a 23-page manifesto faxed to ABC News' New York offices about his reasoning for the shooting.	
26	In the wake of the Alison Parker/Adam Ward shooting, USA Network announces the postponement of the first-season finale of Mr. Robot – which was originally scheduled to air that evening – to September 2, citing a graphic scene in the episode similar to the shootings inflicted by Vester Flanigan. IFC follows suit on August 27 by replacing that evening's episode of Documentary Now!, which included a scene in which two journalists are killed on-camera, with another episode in the series.	
28	The Los Angeles Dodgers announce that Vin Scully will continue to call games on television and radio for the 2016 season, his 67th as a broadcaster for the team dating back to its days in Brooklyn. The news is revealed during the Dodgers' game against the Chicago Cubs in Los Angeles by way of a sketch featuring comedian Jimmy Kimmel on the Dodger Stadium video board. At a news conference the following day, the 87-year-old Scully indicated he would likely leave the broadcast booth at the end of 2016.	
28	ESPN Full Court and ESPN GamePlan both cease operations and their both replaced ESPN College Extra. It will offer a select bundle of games that would previously have been broadcast by GamePlan and Full Court and the package is much less promoted or available than it has been in the past with the drawing down of pay-per-view to select special events; all of Full Court's events are available through WatchESPN via various ESPN3 streams without cost through TV Everywhere authentication.	
30	The 2015 MTV Video Music Awards, hosted by Miley Cyrus, airs on all Viacom-owned MTV networks (MTV, MTV2, VH1, VH1 Classic, Logo TV, BET, Centric, Comedy Central, TV Land, and CMT) and streaming online. The event also saw Kanye West received a Michael Jackson Video Vanguard Award from the person who he interrupted back at the 2009 Awards, Taylor Swift, who took home four awards for "Bad Blood".	
31	A month and a half after assuming full ownership of the since renamed MundoMax, Colombian broadcaster RCN takes over the operations of MundoMax affiliates KWHY-TV/Los Angeles and KUVM-CD/Houston under shared services agreements with Meruelo Group. As a result, RCN shut down KWHY's news department (immediately canceling the station's weekday evening newscasts), and laid off 50 to 60 positions within its news, marketing and sales staffs (about 40 of which belonged to the news department). Five other staffers will have their positions transferred to MundoMax's Los Angeles network headquarters (including KWHY lead anchor Palmira Pérez, who will anchor one-minute local and national news briefs for the network).	

=== September ===
Date	Event	Source
1	Gray Television announces that it will acquire ABC affiliate KCRG-TV/Cedar Rapids for $100 million. It is the first television station acquisition in Iowa for Gray, and marks the Cedar Rapids-based Gazette Company's exit from broadcasting (it continues to operate Cedar Rapids' daily newspaper, The Gazette).	
4	DirecTV and Al Jazeera America settle their $74.5 million breach of contract lawsuit and reach a new carriage agreement that included the HD feed of the network on the satellite provider's lineup for the first time later added on November 2.	
8	Media General announces plans to acquire broadcasting and publishing entity Meredith Corporation for $2.4 billion, a deal that would have created the nation's 4th largest TV broadcasting group, owning and operating 84 stations covering 30% of U.S. TV households. In a move seen by analysts as a maneuver to torpedo the Media General-Meredith merger, Nexstar Broadcasting Group, which made a takeover bid for Media General that was rejected on August 10, makes a $4.1 billion offer on September 28 to acquire Media General (minus the Meredith properties). After months of wrangling between the sides, Nexstar would ultimately succeed in its efforts, announcing a $4.6 billion deal to acquire Media General in January 2016, this after Meredith agreed to walk away from its own deal with Media General.	
8	The Late Show with Stephen Colbert makes its debut on CBS, with George Clooney and Jeb Bush as Colbert's first guests. The extended 67-minute premiere handily beat out its network late-night competition in its 11:35 p.m. (Eastern) timeslot, pulling in a 4.9 rating/13 share overall with 13% of American homes tuning in.	
13	For the first time since she relinquished the title of Miss America 1984 to Suzette Charles after nude photos were released, Vanessa Williams returned as a judge for the telecast of Miss America 2016, which aired on ABC. Williams and her mother Helen Williams also received an on-air apology from Sam Haskell, the executive chairman of the Miss America pageant, over her being stripped of her title and how his predecessors handled the situation during Williams' reign.	
14	Gray Television announces that its acquisition of Schurz Communications' broadcasting properties for $442.5 million, which will expand Gray's television portfolio to 49 stations across 28 states, and also includes Schurz's radio properties – marking Gray's expansion into radio – in South Bend and Lafayette, Indiana, and Rapid City, South Dakota. As part of the deal, on October 1, Gray traded ABC affiliate KAKE-TV/Wichita to Lockwood Broadcast Group in exchange for CW affiliate WBXX/Knoxville (forming a duopoly with Gray-owned CBS affiliate WVLT) and CBS affiliate WSBT-TV/South Bend to the Sinclair Broadcast Group for NBC affiliate WLUC-TV/Marquette (Gray will keep its existing South Bend NBC affiliate WNDU and Schurz's CBS/CW duopoly of KWCH–KSCW-DT in Wichita). The remaining properties will have their operations consolidated, with Schurz-owned NBC affiliate WAGT/Augusta, Georgia, merging with Gray-owned CBS affiliate WRDW, while Schurz-owned KOTA-TV/Rapid City and its satellite stations will merge with Gray-owned Fox affiliate KEVN and its satellite KIVV/Lead (KOTA's assets – minus its ABC affiliation, which will migrate to a subchannel of KEVN – were sold to Legacy Broadcasting on October 1). With its acquisition of NBC-CW duopoly KYTV–K15CZ/Springfield, Missouri, and NBC affiliate KTUU/Anchorage, the deal will give Gray its first properties in Missouri and Alaska. Schurz will retain its publishing, cable television and digital media assets (including flagship newspaper, the South Bend Tribune).	
14	Just four days after Donald Trump bought back 50% of the Miss Universe Organization from NBCUniversal on September 11, the businessman-turned-presidential candidate turns around and sells the organization to WME–IMG, who also serves as the pageant's producers and will continue to do so under the acquisition. In a separate move on the same day, NBC taps Arnold Schwarzenegger to serve as the new host of Trump's former show, The Apprentice, when it returns in the 2016–17 season.	
14	For the first time in its seven-season run (to date), two contestants successfully complete the Mount Midoriyama obstacle on American Ninja Warrior as cameraman Geoff Britten and busboy/professional rock climber Isaac Caldiero – who are also the first to reach the fourth and final stage of the Las Vegas-based national finals round – both scale a 75-foot (23 m) rope climb within the 30-second time limit; although Britten (who finished with less than 0.30 seconds left on the clock) was the first to finish the course, Caldiero beat his time by 3.6 seconds to win the $1 million grand prize.	
14	After 31 years in national syndication, ABC owned-and-operated KTRK-TV/Houston began airing Jeopardy!, making it the last ABC O&O to carry the Sony Pictures Television game show, which along with sister game show Wheel of Fortune have been staples on ABC's other O&Os since the 1980s. Tegna-owned CBS affiliate KHOU, which has aired the Merv Griffin game shows since 1986, expanded its 4:00 p.m. newscast to one hour to fill Jeopardy!'s timeslot, and continues to carry Wheel Of Fortune, making Houston one of the few markets, where both game shows air on separate stations.	
14	KCOP-TV/Los Angeles moves the programming lineup of MyNetworkTV from primetime (during which time period, it is replaced with syndicated entertainment news magazines) to late nights (11:00 p.m.-1:00 am); it is a notable move as the programming service is owned by Fox Entertainment Group and operated by KCOP's parent Fox Television Stations (the station is the first Fox-owned station and the highest-profile MyNetworkTV affiliate to make the move).	
17	Nexstar Broadcasting Group announces its $44 million purchase of the Reiten Television stations, which include Bismarck, North Dakota CBS affiliate KXMB-TV and semi-satellites KXMA-TV/Dickinson, KXMC-TV/Minot, and KXMD-TV/Williston (all four of which comprise the KX Television network). Nexstar intends to continue Reiten's sharing agreements with Forum Communications, owner of the market's ABC affiliates KBMY/Bismarck and KMCY/Minot, in which the KX stations provide sales and other services to KBMY/KMCY.	
17	Netherlands-based Altice announces that it will acquire Bethpage, New York-based Cablevision from the Dolan family for $17.7 billion; the deal, which is expected to close in 2016 pending approval from the FCC and federal regulators (due to Altice being a foreign-owned entity), will include Cablevision's regional News 12 Networks, Newsday, and AmNewYork. While the acquisition signals the Dolan family's exit from the company that they launched in 1973, they will retain ownership of AMC Networks, The Madison Square Garden Company, and the New York Knicks and Rangers sports teams.	
19	With a final episode (subtitled "¡Hasta Siempre!" or "Forever") that is simulcast live in Chile, Mexico, and the U.S. (the only time in the show's history that occurred), Sábado Gigante ends its 53-year run. The three-hour variety show, hosted by Don Francisco, exits as the longest-running variety series in television history. It originated on Chilean television in 1962 before moving to Miami and joining Univision in 1986.	
20	The 67th Primetime Emmy Awards airs on Fox, with Andy Samberg as host. The night's significant winners include outstanding series wins for HBO's Olive Kitteridge (limited series), Game of Thrones (drama),Veep (comedy, the first cable series to win that award), and The Voice (Reality-Competition, their second win in the category after 2013); the first two Emmys for Amazon (Jeffrey Tambor as lead comedy actor and Joey Soloway for comedy directing, both for Transparent); and notable acting wins for Jon Hamm (his first, for Mad Men's final season) and Viola Davis (the first African-American to win in the lead drama series actress category, for How To Get Away With Murder). Comedian Tracy Morgan makes his first public appearance since his June 2014 auto accident, presenting the final award of the evening for Outstanding Drama Series.	
22	With his suspension from NBC News lifted, Brian Williams returns to an on-air role as lead anchor of MSNBC's coverage of Pope Francis' visit to the United States. This marks a return to MSNBC for Williams, who will anchor its breaking news coverage (Williams anchored one of the cable network's early programs, The News, from its 1996 launch until 2004). Williams' addition is also part of a transition for MSNBC, which will emphasize breaking news coverage during the daytime hours and limit its generally progressive- and liberal-leaning opinion shows to early mornings and weeknights.	
22	Eddie Huang confirms that he is no longer contributing as a consultant, co-producer, or narrator on the ABC sitcom Fresh Off the Boat. Huang, who wrote the autobiographical memoirs on which the show is based, had long taken issue with the direction of the series. With Huang's departure, the show, which premiers its second season on this date, will no longer regularly utilize any form of narrative voiceover.	
22	During that evening's edition of CW affiliate WGN-TV/Chicago's 9:00 p.m. newscast, an image of a yellow badge – a symbol used by Nazis to identify Jews during the Holocaust which is now considered antisemitic – is displayed within an over-the-shoulder graphic during a story about the observance of Yom Kippur. Following criticism of the incident via email and social media, WGN general manager Greg Easterly and news director Jennifer Lyons issue a joint apology for the graphical mistake, acknowledging that the badge image was lifted from an image bank by a station graphics department staffer for use in the story.	
23	Sportscaster Dick Enberg announces the 2016 season will be his last as play-by-play voice for the San Diego Padres, and that he intends to retire. Enberg, who formerly called high-profile events for NBC Sports and CBS Sports from the 1970s to the 2000s, has been part of the Padres broadcasting team since 2009.	
28	The Nick Jr. Channel block of programming known as NickMom ends its almost three-year run with an early morning airing of the 1994 motion picture Guarding Tess. Debuting amid controversy in 2012 (due to the inclusion of adult content on a kids-oriented channel), NickMom aired in late primetime and catered to young mothers with a mix of comedic and lighthearted content, both original and acquired (the latter including Parenthood). Nick Jr. will program the vacated time with episodes of the network's most popular preschool-oriented series.	
28	Nine months after joining the Comedy Central news satire program as a contributor, and eight weeks after previous host Jon Stewart departed, Trevor Noah takes over as host of The Daily Show, with Kevin Hart appearing as his first guest.	
30	Music channel Fuse TV merges with Latino-targeted general entertainment channel NuvoTV, with the combined channel's programming lineup being refocused to feature original music, comedy, culture and lifestyle programming. A new music-oriented cable channel, FM, takes over the channel space vacated by Nuvo.	

=== October ===
Date	Event	Source
1	Fox affiliate WFXR/Roanoke, Virginia launches its news department with the debut of expanded weekday morning and nightly 10:00 p.m. newscasts (the former of which was expanded from two hours to four, and the latter expanding to an hour on weekends, matching the existing running time of that program's weeknight editions). The change followed the September 30 termination of a news share agreement with Media General-owned WSLS-TV that – since its formation in 1996 – saw the NBC affiliate produce news content for WFXR (which, along with CW-affiliated sister WWCW, was acquired by the Nexstar Broadcasting Group as part of its 2013 purchase of Grant Broadcasting System II), as well as WFXR/WWCW's move into a new 14,830 sq ft (0.3-acre) studio facility in Hollins (near Roanoke–Blacksburg Regional Airport) earlier in September.	
1	Gray Television announces that it will purchase MyNetworkTV affiliate KYES-TV/Anchorage from Fireweed Communications for $500,000. Due to financial issues with that station, Gray will acquire KYES through a failing station waiver, in order to form a duopoly with NBC affiliate KTUU-TV (one of the stations involved in Gray's September 14 purchase of Schurz Communications, with the deal announced alongside a series of trades in four markets where both Gray and Schurz own television stations) to comply with FCC ownership regulations that otherwise restrict duopolies in markets with fewer than eight distinctive full-power station owners.	
5	Regional sports network SportSouth rebrands as Fox Sports Southeast. The renaming of the Fox Sports Networks outlet – which serves Georgia, Tennessee, Alabama, Mississippi, South Carolina, and parts of North Carolina – was due to viewer confusion cited in research surveys that was caused by its sister network's 2012 rebranding to Fox Sports South, as part of the regional networks' rebranding under the Fox Sports umbrella prefix.	
5	Fox affiliates WGBC/Meridian and WHPM-LD/Hattiesburg, Mississippi (both owned by Waypoint Media) launch nightly half-hour 9:00 p.m. newscasts, marking the first prime time newscasts to air in both markets. While its prime time newscast marks the first local news program ever to air on WHPM (which joined Fox in October 2011), WGBC's newscast is its first full-scale news program since the then-NBC affiliate stopped simulcasting newscasts from its CBS-affiliated LMA partner WMDN in 1998 (WGBC moved NBC programming to a digital subchannel when it became a primary Fox affiliate in January 2009); WMDN would shut down its news department in 2005, before news was restored on both stations in 2009 in the form of cut-ins.	
5	"The '90s Are All That", a late-night program block featuring Nickelodeon live-action and animated series from the 1990s that has aired on TeenNick since 2011, relaunches as "The Splat" and expands from four hours to eight (running from 10:00 p.m. to 6:00 am. Eastern Time).	
5	Viacom Media Networks shifts editorial control of the music video-oriented digital cable channel MTV Jams from MTV to BET Networks to unite Viacom's urban-based music networks under one banner. BET Networks subsequently renames the network to BET Jams.	
6	Former U.S. Olympic softball player Jessica Mendoza becomes the first woman to serve as color analyst for a Major League Baseball postseason game as a member of the broadcast team for ESPN's coverage of the American League Wild Card Game, which sees the Houston Astros shut out the New York Yankees, 3–0, at Yankee Stadium. However, on October 7, the news also sparked a negative and sexist series of tweets from Mike Bell, who is immediately placed on a three-day suspension from his duties as afternoon co-host at CBS Radio-owned sports talk outlet WZGC/Atlanta, in which he slammed ESPN for not hiring a sportscaster with professional baseball credentials to do the play-by-play and questioned Mendoza's qualifications to actually do a baseball telecast; the comments were also condemned by the Atlanta Falcons, which maintains a broadcasting partnership with WZGC as the flagship of the team's radio network.	
8	NBC affiliate WLBZ/Bangor, Maine, discontinues its 6:00 p.m. newscast in favor of one produced by Portland sister station WCSH. All other newscasts on WLBZ had already originated at WCSH (under the shared "NewsCenter" brand), and are simulcast in both markets; the change allows the WLBZ newsroom to provide more content to all of the shared newscasts instead of focusing primarily on a single local newscast. WLBZ continues to produce its own weather segments on weeknights.	
9	Wheel of Fortune saw its first seven-round game since the September 22, 2005, episode. About two months later on December 23, a second seven-round game was also played this season.	
12	Completing an operational merger that occurred in 2002 following the formation of a shared services agreement between the two stations by the latter's owner Lilly Broadcasting, CBS affiliate WSEE-TV/Erie, Pennsylvania (owned by Lilly subsidiary SJL Broadcasting) cancels its separate weekday morning, 6:00 and 11:00 p.m. newscasts, and begins simulcasting newscasts produced by NBC-affiliated sister station WICU-TV, which now air under the unified brand Erie News Now. The move by WICU/WSEE (which had earlier consolidated production of their weekend evening newscasts in 2012) was cited by the stations' executive vice president John Christianson as being motivated by audience research that showed the two stations' news programs were seen as essentially the same newscast with different anchors. Most of WSEE's staff is either laid off or reassigned to other positions as a result. The operation will continue to produce separate midday newscasts for both WSEE and WICU, as well as an existing prime time newscast on CW Plus affiliate WSEE-DT2. A new weekend morning newscast that is simulcast on WSEE and WICU would debut five days later on October 17.	
14	Abby Lee Miller, the star of the Lifetime reality series Dance Moms and its spin-offs, is charged with 20 counts of bankruptcy fraud after it was revealed that she concealed income and assets received in 2012 and 2013 that totaled up to $755,000 (most of it from the television shows and related media entities, including a $288,000 check from Collins Avenue Entertainment, which the judge handling the case cited after watching Abby's Ultimate Dance Competition, ads for "The Maniac is Back" and her appearance on American Idol), and making false bankruptcy declarations (her four dance studios filed for bankruptcy in 2010, while Miller had her homes in Pennsylvania and Florida declared liabilities because of mortgage payments and escrow issues, and owed about $60,000 in back taxes to the Penn Hills School District and Allegheny County) following an investigation by the FBI, IRS and postal inspectors. Although she is expected to be arraigned on November 5, Miller will continue work on Dance Moms, which is currently shot in Los Angeles.	
17	Tracy Morgan returns to Saturday Night Live as host of that night's episode, marking his first comedic TV appearance since a multi-vehicle car crash in June 2014 that left him in a coma for two weeks (and resulted in several months of physical rehabilitation afterward) and killed his friend, comedian James McNair.	
25	In what is termed a "grand experiment", that day's National Football League game in London, England between the Buffalo Bills and Jacksonville Jaguars was streamed exclusively and for free on the Internet, instead of airing on conventional television outside the Buffalo and Jacksonville markets, nor was it aired on NFL Sunday Ticket. The rights to livestream the game were awarded by the league to Yahoo! Sports.	
26	NRJ TV purchases MundoMax affiliate KFWD/Dallas from HIC Broadcast Inc. for $9.9 million. Under the terms of the deal, HIC is required to register for the upcoming broadcast incentive spectrum auction to be held in March 2016, prior to the FCC's December 18 deadline for television stations to apply for potential bidding, and enter into a channel-share agreement if so requested by NRJ (which has bought television stations in several other markets over the previous three years, with the intent of selling their spectrum – either resulting in the station also relinquishing its license and ceasing broadcasting entirely, or sharing a channel allocation with another station – in the auction).	
26	NBC affiliate WKTV in Utica, New York, announces on-air it has signed an affiliation deal with CBS for WKTV-DT2, giving the Utica market its first full-time CBS affiliate. The move takes effect November 22, at which time WKTV-DT2's former affiliation with The CW moves to WKTV-DT3, while WKTV-DT3's former affiliation with MeTV moves to a new fourth digital subchannel. WKTV's deal with CBS also gives Utica in-market affiliates of all four major commercial networks, leaving Watertown as the sole market in New York not to have full network service (until December 1, 2016, when WVNC-LD signs-on as that market's first full-time NBC affiliate).	
27	During the live broadcast of Game 1 of the 2015 World Series between the New York Mets and the Kansas City Royals, Fox suffers a computer system failure with its transmission equipment, resulting in a loss of coverage for 15 minutes, followed by a five-minute in-game delay while officials addressed the availability of video review due to the loss of the Fox feed. The teams agreed to allow the use of footage from MLB International's world feed of the game for video review, while Fox also temporarily switched to the MLB International feed with Matt Vasgersian and John Smoltz, later replaced by play-by-play announcer Joe Buck, and analysts Harold Reynolds and Tom Verducci before the main Fox Sports production was restored.	
28	After being purchased by competitor TVG Network, the name of horse racing channel HRTV is changed to TVG2.	
30	Displeased by the performance of the moderators during the October 28 debate on CNBC over what the candidates claim were "Gotcha questions" that the network defended as "Tough Questions" that they should be able to answer, The Republican National Committee announced that is suspending the February 26, 2016, debate that was to air on NBC and Telemundo, citing the actions of parent company Comcast and its news divisions, including MSNBC, of being hostile to the candidates and media bias towards the GOP in general.	
31	Comet, a digital multicast network focused on science fiction and fantasy programming, launches. The network, owned by Sinclair Broadcast Group (through its Sinclair Television Group subsidiary) and MGM Television, features series and films from the aforementioned genres sourced from the Metro-Goldwyn-Mayer library, with stations owned and/or operated by Sinclair, Tribune Broadcasting and Titan Broadcast Management as its charter outlets, covering markets reaching 30% of U.S. television households. The network replaced ZUUS Country on Sinclair stations in many of the markets, while it is carried on a newly created subchannel in others.	

=== November ===
Date	Event	Source
1	Ion Television begins a shift in carriage strategy, coming to terms with commercial station group Media General on an agreement that sees the network's main feed carried as a digital subchannel on Media General's stations in markets where the network has no means of owning or affiliating with an individual station alone for all of their services. This includes markets such as Austin, Texas, Green Bay, Wisconsin, Davenport, Iowa, Richmond, Virginia, and Springfield, Massachusetts.	
5	A judge in the Superior Court of Los Angeles County orders the producers of Dancing with the Stars to withdraw Bindi Irwin from the Season 21 competition because of a California state law, in which because Irwin is a minor (she is 17), is required to have both her parents, Terri and Steve Irwin, to release their rights to her money before she can get paid. Terri – who is the only surviving parent – had already signed a form stating that she would give up all rights to any money her daughter will make on the show ($230,000 as of the eighth episode). However, because Steve died in 2006, the judge asked for a legal death certificate in order to let her continue in the competition, which their family lawyer is expected to submit. On November 24, Irwin would go on to win the coveted trophy.	
5	For the first time ever in the history of its 14 season run, 24-year-old Ashley Tipton from San Diego becomes the first plus-sized fashion designer to win Project Runway. Her win also sparked outrage from some viewers, who wanted the judges to choose either Kelly Dempsey, Edmond Newton, or Candice Cuoco, to be the winner, while others believe the judges made the right decision in picking Tipton.	
6–13	With a record of seven days and 18 minutes (visiting 50 states, traveling 17,000 miles and delivering 104 forecasts), NBC personality Al Roker sets a new Guinness-verified world record for the fastest time to report a weather forecast from all 50 United States states. His weeklong marathon, dubbed as Rokerthon 2 and broadcast on Today, began in Honolulu, Hawaii on November 6 and ended at NBC's headquarters at New York City's GE Building on the 13th.	
13	In the wake of a terror attack (which the radical group ISIS would later claim responsibility for carrying out) that claimed 129 lives in and around Paris, the group U2 and HBO mutually announced the cancellation of a concert that was scheduled to air live on November 15 out of concerns for the safety of spectators who would be attending the show (of the 129 that were killed, 112 were at the Bataclan theatre to see an American group, Eagles of Death Metal, which also added to the reasoning). Explosions, later found out to be suicide bombers who were unable to enter a match between France and Germany that was taking place at Stade de France, in the suburb of Saint-Denis, were heard over the broadcast of the match, where five people were killed by one of the three suicide bombers; the match finished with a 2–0 victory for France, mainly to keep spectators in the venue from harm outside.	
16	Universal Sports Network discontinues operations. The network, which launched in 2006 as the over-the-air World Championship Sports Network and converted to cable/satellite distribution in 2012, featured coverage of Olympic-sanctioned sporting events (e.g. cycling, cyclocross, track, mountain biking and road racing). NBCUniversal, which owned a minority stake in USN (alongside Intermedia Partners), acquires the network's programming rights to air on NBC, NBCSN, and Universal HD.	
17–19	ABC's morning news/talk show Good Morning America celebrates its 40th anniversary on the air with a live 40-hour event titled GMA 40 for 40, which aired mainly online and on the main program beginning at 5:00 p.m. (Eastern Time) on November 17 and concluding at 9:00 a.m. on the 19th. The anniversary event featured several guests (including appearances by the cast of the network's shows such as Dancing with the Stars, The Muppets, Shark Tank, General Hospital, The View, Scandal and Nashville), performances by One Direction and Pitbull, and a reunion of the former and current anchors from the show's 40-year history.	
18	Univision NOW, an over-the-top video on demand streaming service, launches. The service, which is initially available for a $5.99 per month or $59.99 per year subscription through its standalone website and apps for iOS and Android devices, features content from the Univision Communications-owned Spanish language broadcast networks Univision and UniMás (with the exception of some entertainment programming, such as dubbed American feature films seen on UniMás), with newer episodes of prime time series being made available for streaming for seven days after their original airdate. Univision NOW also includes live programming streams from the two networks as well as news streams from select Univision stations.	
20	After less than three months on the show, Tyra Banks announced that she has made the decision to leave FABLife to focus on her cosmetics company and scheduled television projects. She will continue to oversee the syndicated talk show as executive producer and make occasional appearances.	
22	Disney Channel premiered The Lion Guard: Return of the Roar, which is the pilot film for the Disney Junior animated series The Lion Guard.	

=== December ===
Date	Event	Source
2	After being on hiatus for eleven years Adult Swim Announces that Samurai Jack would return for a fifth season to conclude the series which would official air on March 11, 2017.	
4	Both CNN and MSNBC, along with local broadcast outlets in the Los Angeles media market, are criticized by viewers on social media for showing live footage inside the apartment that was inhabited by Rizwan Farook and Tashfeen Malik until the December 2, mass shooting in which they opened gunfire at a community center holiday party in San Bernardino, California, killing 14 people and injuring 21 others, before being fatally shot by local police. The reporters were allowed access to the place by the landlord after the Federal Bureau of Investigation (FBI) gave him parlance to allow them to visit inside the apartment.	
7	Fox News Networks, LLC suspends contributors Stacey Dash and Retired Lt. Colonel Ralph Peters for two weeks after both made profanity-laced remarks about President Barack Obama's speech regarding Islamic terrorism and the U.S.'s strategy to fight ISIS on December 6 respectively on Fox News Channel and Fox Business Network, while the division immediately apologized to viewers.	
8	The 2015 Victoria's Secret Fashion Show is broadcast on CBS. 6.59 million people tune in.	
15	Willard Scott, a longtime weather anchor for NBC's Today who joined the program in 1980 and became famous for his birthday wishes to centenarians, retires after 65 years in broadcasting.	
20	During the final moments of Miss Universe 2015 (which was telecast by Fox in English and Azteca in Spanish, both networks having acquired the rights to the pageant on October 28, following Donald Trump's sale of the Miss Universe Organization to WME/IMG), host Steve Harvey mistakenly announces Miss Colombia, Ariadna Gutiérrez, as the Miss Universe winner and Miss Philippines, Pia Wurtzbach, as the first runner-up. However, moments after Gutiérrez's crowning, after being corrected by pageant officials backstage, Harvey apologized and revealed that he read the card incorrectly and that Wurtzbach was the actual winner of the Miss Universe title. Paulina Vega of Colombia, who won the title in 2014, then handed the crown over to Wurtzbach before the broadcast abruptly ended. Harvey later issued a second apology for the error to both contestants on Twitter, which he later re-posted after correcting spelling errors of the contestants' representative countries.	
28	VH1 Soul was given over to BET Networks as part of the continuing reorganization of Viacom's assets due to ratings and financial issues in 2015, an issue that had already resulted in BET Networks taking editorial control of the former MTV Jams two months before. The network was rebranded as BET Soul on that day.	

== Awards ==
Category/Organization	73rd Golden Globe Awards January 10, 2016	6th Critics' Choice Television Awards December 17, 2016	Producers Guild and Screen Actors Guild Awards January 23–30, 2017	68th Primetime Emmy Awards September 18, 2017
Best Drama Series	Mr. Robot		Game of Thrones	
Best Comedy Series	Mozart in the Jungle	Master of None	Transparent	Veep
Best Limited Series	Wolf Hall	Fargo		The People v. O. J. Simpson: American Crime Story
Best Actor in a Drama Series	Jon Hamm; Mad Men	Rami Malek; Mr. Robot	Kevin Spacey; House of Cards	Rami Malek; Mr. Robot
Best Actress in a Drama Series	Taraji P. Henson; Empire	Carrie Coon; The Leftovers	Viola Davis; How to Get Away with Murder	Tatiana Maslany; Orphan Black
Best Supporting Actor in a Drama Series	Christian Slater; Mr. Robot		—N/a	Ben Mendelsohn; Bloodline
Best Supporting Actress in a Drama Series	Maura Tierney; The Affair	Constance Zimmer; UnREAL	—N/a	Maggie Smith; Downton Abbey
Best Actor in a Comedy Series	Gael García Bernal; Mozart in the Jungle	Jeffrey Tambor; Transparent		
Best Actress in a Comedy Series	Rachel Bloom; Crazy Ex-Girlfriend		Uzo Aduba; Orange Is the New Black	Julia Louis-Dreyfus; Veep
Best Supporting Actor in a Comedy Series	—N/a	Andre Braugher; Brooklyn Nine-Nine	—N/a	Louie Anderson; Baskets
Best Supporting Actress in a Comedy Series	—N/a	Mayim Bialik; The Big Bang Theory	—N/a	Kate McKinnon; Saturday Night Live
Best Actor in a Limited Series	Oscar Isaac; Show Me a Hero	Idris Elba; Luther		Courtney B. Vance; The People v. O. J. Simpson: American Crime Story
Best Actress in a Limited Series	Lady Gaga; American Horror Story: Hotel	Kirsten Dunst; Fargo	Queen Latifah; Bessie	Sarah Paulson; The People v. O. J. Simpson: American Crime Story
Best Supporting Actor in a Limited Series	—N/a	Jesse Plemons; Fargo	—N/a	Sterling K. Brown; The People v. O. J. Simpson: American Crime Story
Best Supporting Actress in a Limited Series	—N/a	Jean Smart; Fargo	—N/a	Regina King; American Crime

== Television programs ==
=== Debuts ===
Date	Show	Channel	Source
January 1	Big Women: Big Love	Lifetime	
January 4	Galavant	ABC	
January 6	Agent Carter	ABC	
January 6	Child Genius	Lifetime	
January 6	Framework	Spike	
January 7	Empire	Fox	
January 7	Hindsight	VH1	
January 11	Togetherness	HBO	
January 12	Little Charmers	Nickelodeon/Nick Jr. Channel	
January 12	Eye Candy	MTV	
January 13	Wrestling with Death	WGN America	
January 13	Big Giant Swords	Discovery Channel	
January 13	Jack Vale Offline	HLN	
January 14	Man Seeking Woman	FXX	
January 14	The Story Behind	Pop	
January 15	The Man in the High Castle	Amazon Video	
January 16	12 Monkeys	Syfy	
January 16	The Adventures of Puss in Boots	Netflix	
January 16	World's Funniest	Fox	
January 17	Bella and the Bulldogs	Nickelodeon	
January 18	K.C. Undercover	Disney Channel	
January 18	Star vs. the Forces of Evil	Disney XD	
January 19	The Nightly Show with Larry Wilmore	Comedy Central	
January 22	Backstrom	Fox	
January 22	This Is Not Happening	Comedy Central	
January 29	Duff Till Dawn	Food Network	
January 29	Fortitude	Pivot	
February 4	Fresh Off the Boat	ABC	
February 5	Allegiance	NBC	
February 6	Miles from Tomorrowland	Disney Jr.	
February 6	Ever After High	Netflix	
February 8	Better Call Saul	AMC	
February 11	Schitt's Creek	Pop	
February 17	Our Little Family	TLC	
February 17	Repeat After Me	ABC	
February 19	The Odd Couple	CBS	
February 20	Richie Rich	Netflix	
February 20	The Jack and Triumph Show	Adult Swim	
February 24	Outlaw Country	WGN America	
February 25	Dinner at Tiffani's	Cooking Channel	
February 28	Good Witch	Hallmark Channel	
March 1	The Last Man on Earth	Fox	
March 1	Secrets and Lies	ABC	
March 1	The Wonder List	CNN	
March 1	Battle Creek	CBS	
March 4	CSI: Cyber	CBS	
March 5	Dig	USA Network	
March 5	American Crime	ABC	
March 6	In an Instant	ABC	
March 6	Unbreakable Kimmy Schmidt	Netflix	
March 7	My Lottery Dream Home	HGTV	
March 9	The Returned	A&E	
March 10	Powers	PlayStation Network	
March 14	Transformers: Robots in Disguise	Cartoon Network	
March 15	The Royals	E!	
March 17	iZombie	The CW	
March 17	One Big Happy	NBC	
March 20	Bloodline	Netflix	
March 23	The Late Late Show with James Corden	CBS	
March 23	Sin City Saints	Yahoo! Screen	
March 25	Big Time in Hollywood, FL	Comedy Central	
March 28	Harvey Beaks	Nickelodeon	
March 28	Monopoly Millionaire's Club	Syndication	
March 31	Weird Loners	Fox	
March 31	Younger	TV Land	
April 2	Lip Sync Battle	Spike	
April 2	Olympus	Syfy	
April 3	The Grace Helbig Show	E!	
April 5	Happyish	Showtime	
April 6	Make It Pop	Nickelodeon	
April 7	Your Family or Mine	TBS	
April 9	The Comedians	FX	
April 10	Daredevil	Netflix	
April 13	Impossible Engineering	Science Channel	
April 14	Other Space	Yahoo! Screen	
April 17	Cedric's Barber Battle	The CW	
April 17	The Messengers	The CW	
April 26	Queens of Drama	Pop	
April 26	Chef's Table	Netflix	
May 1	Beyond the Tank	ABC	
May 8	Grace and Frankie	Netflix	
May 13	Sing It On	Pop	
May 14	Wayward Pines	Fox	
May 20	500 Questions	ABC	
May 22	The Hustlers	TruTV	
May 22	American Diner Revival	Food Network	
May 26	The Island	NBC	
May 26	I Can Do That	NBC	
May 27	Bullseye	Fox	
May 27	The Briefcase	CBS	
May 28	Aquarius	NBC	
May 28	3AM	Showtime	
May 30	100 Things to Do Before High School	Nickelodeon	
June 1	The Whispers	ABC	
June 2	Stitchers	ABC Family	
June 5	Catching Monsters	Discovery Channel	
June 5	Sense8	Netflix	
June 14	Humans	AMC	
June 15	The Making of the Mob	AMC	
June 15	Fresh Beat Band of Spies	Nickelodeon/Nick Jr. Channel	
June 16	Proof	TNT	
June 16	Clipped	TBS	
June 17	Deutschland 83	SundanceTV	
June 18	The Astronaut Wives Club	ABC	
June 19	Killjoys	Syfy	
June 21	Ballers	HBO	
June 21	The Brink	HBO	
June 23	Another Period	Comedy Central	
June 24	Mr. Robot	USA Network	
June 25	Boom!	Fox	
June 26	Best Friends Whenever	Disney Channel	
June 26	Dragons: Race to the Edge	Netflix	
June 30	Scream	MTV	
June 30	Zoo	CBS	
July 6	Lego Star Wars: Droid Tales	Disney XD	
July 8	Million Dollar Listing San Francisco	Bravo	
July 8	Why? with Hannibal Buress	Comedy Central	
July 9	One Bad Choice	MTV	
July 10	Mutt & Stuff	Nickelodeon/Nick Jr. Channel	
July 13	Monica the Medium	ABC Family	
July 15	Blue Collar Millionaires	CNBC	
July 15	I Am Jazz	TLC	
July 15	The Jim Gaffigan Show	TV Land	
July 16	Sex & Drugs & Rock & Roll	FX	
July 16	Geeks Who Drink	Syfy	
July 18	Pig Goat Banana Cricket	Nickelodeon	
July 19	Save My Life: Boston Trauma	ABC	
July 21	Knock Knock Live	Fox	
July 22	Home Free	Fox	
July 22	Gamer's Guide to Pretty Much Everything	Disney XD	
July 25	Boston EMS	ABC	
July 25	Race to Escape	Science	
July 26	I Am Cait	E!	
July 27	We Bare Bears	Cartoon Network	
July 29	Fameless	TruTV	
July 31	Cold Justice: Sex Crimes	TNT	
July 31	Bunk'd	Disney Channel	
July 31	Wet Hot American Summer: First Day of Camp	Netflix	
August 3	Ice & Coco	Syndication	
August 3	Significant Mother	The CW	
August 3	ALVINNN!!! And the Chipmunks	Nickelodeon	
August 4	West Texas Investors Club	CNBC	
August 5	A Wicked Offer	The CW	
August 5	Mr. Robinson	NBC	
August 5	Job or No Job	ABC Family	
August 7	Project Mc2	Netflix	
August 11	Next Step Realty: NYC	ABC Family	
August 11	Startup U	ABC Family	
August 12	Kevin from Work	ABC Family	
August 12	Make Me A Millionaire Investor	CNBC	
August 14	Dinotrux	Netflix	
August 18	Six Degrees of Everything	TruTV	
August 20	Documentary Now!	IFC	
August 22	Blunt Talk	Starz	
August 23	Fear the Walking Dead	AMC	
August 24	Shimmer and Shine	Nickelodeon/Nick Jr. Channel	
August 25	Public Morals	TNT	
August 26	The Carmichael Show	NBC	
August 28	Narcos	Netflix	
August 31	Todrick	MTV	
August 31	Girl Code Live	MTV	
September 7	Pickle and Peanut	Disney XD	
September 7	Thomas Edison's Secret Lab	PBS	
September 7	Total Drama Presents: The Ridonculous Race	Cartoon Network	
September 8	The Late Show with Stephen Colbert	CBS	
September 12	Game Shakers	Nickelodeon	
September 12	Goldie & Bear	Disney Jr.	
September 14	FABLife	Syndication	
September 14	Crime Watch Daily	Syndication	
September 14	Crazy Talk	Syndication	
September 14	The Social (American premiere)	Syndication	
September 14	Hollywood Today Live (exclusive to stations owned by Fox Television Stations and Media General)	Syndication	
September 14	Corrupt Crimes (selected markets)	Syndication	
September 15	The Bastard Executioner	FX	
September 15	Best Time Ever with Neil Patrick Harris	NBC	
September 16	Moonbeam City	Comedy Central	
September 18	Descendants: Wicked World	Disney Channel	
September 18	PJ Masks	Disney Jr.	
September 20	Dash Dolls	E!	
September 21	Blindspot	NBC	
September 21	Minority Report	Fox	
September 21	New Looney Tunes	Cartoon Network/Boomerang	
September 21	Life in Pieces	CBS	
September 22	Limitless	CBS	
September 22	The Muppets	ABC	
September 22	Scream Queens	Fox	
September 23	Rosewood	Fox	
September 24	The Player	NBC	
September 26	Guardians of the Galaxy	Disney XD	
September 26	Nina's World	Sprout	
September 27	Blood & Oil	ABC	
September 27	Quantico	ABC	
September 28	MTP Daily	MSNBC	
September 29	Grandfathered	Fox	
September 29	The Grinder	Fox	
September 30	Code Black	CBS	
October 1	Benders	IFC	
October 1	Gigi Does It	IFC	
October 2	Dr. Ken	ABC	
October 3	The Inspectors	CBS	
October 4	50/50	Travel Channel	
October 4	Full Measure with Sharyl Attkisson (exclusive to stations owned and/or operated by the Sinclair Broadcast Group)	Syndication	
October 5	Be Cool, Scooby-Doo!	Cartoon Network/Boomerang	
October 5	WITS Academy	Nickelodeon	
October 7	Casual	Hulu	
October 7	Jay Leno's Garage	CNBC	
October 8	SuperMansion	Crackle	
October 9	The Mr. Peabody & Sherman Show	Netflix	
October 10	The Last Kingdom	BBC America	
October 12	Crazy Ex-Girlfriend	The CW	
October 16	Truth Be Told	NBC	
October 21	Love at First Kiss	VH1	
October 26	Black Ink Crew: Chicago	VH1	
October 26	Supergirl	CBS	
October 27	Wicked City	ABC	
October 30	Popples	Netflix	
October 31	Ash vs Evil Dead	Starz	
November 6	Master of None	Netflix	
November 6	Care Bears & Cousins	Netflix	
November 8	Agent X	TNT	
November 8	Matter of Fact with Fernando Espuelas (exclusive to stations owned and operated by Hearst Television)	Syndication	
November 10	Donny!	USA Network	
November 13	Blazing Team: Masters of Yo Kwon Do	Discovery Family	
November 13	W/ Bob & David	Netflix	
November 15	Into the Badlands	AMC	
November 17	Chicago Med	NBC	
November 18	Undeniable with Joe Buck	Audience Network	
November 19	The Art of More	Crackle	
November 20	Jessica Jones	Netflix	
November 25	Christmas Through the Decades	History Channel	
November 25	Nature Cat	PBS Kids	
November 30	Superstore	NBC	
December 1	Real Rob	Netflix	
December 2	Rev Runs Around the World	Travel Channel	
December 2	Santas in the Barn	TruTV	
December 6	Work Out New York	Bravo	
December 6	Miraculous: Tales of Ladybug & Cat Noir	Nickelodeon	
December 7	Telenovela	NBC	
December 13	Married By Mom and Dad	TLC	
December 14	The Expanse	Syfy	
December 16	The Magicians	Syfy	
December 18	F Is for Family	Netflix	
December 18	Making a Murderer	Netflix	
December 24	Dawn of the Croods	Netflix	
December 29	Almost Genius	truTV	

=== Miniseries ===
First aired	Title	Channel	Source
February 8	The Jinx	HBO	
February 12	The Slap	NBC	
February 16	The Book of Negroes	BET	
April 5	A.D. The Bible Continues	NBC	
April 5	American Odyssey	NBC	
April 5	Sinatra: All or Nothing at All	HBO	
April 29	The Casual Vacancy	HBO	
June 7	Serial Thriller: Angel of Decay	Investigation Discovery	
June 11	The Seventies	CNN	
June 13	Jonathan Strange & Mr Norrell	BBC America	
July 8	The Spoils Before Dying	IFC	
August 16	Show Me a Hero	HBO	
September 24	Heroes Reborn	NBC	
November 8	Flesh and Bone	Starz	
November 30	Long Live the Royals	Cartoon Network	
December 7	Neon Joe, Werewolf Hunter	Adult Swim	
December 14	Childhood's End	Syfy	

=== Television films and specials ===
First aired	Title	Channel	Source
January 17	Whitney	Lifetime	
January 17	Bridal Wave	Hallmark Channel	
January 24	Love by the Book	Hallmark Channel	
January 31	Beautiful & Twisted	Lifetime	
February 13	Bad Hair Day	Disney Channel	
February 16	Splitting Adam	Nickelodeon	
April 5	If There Be Thorns	Lifetime	
April 12	Seeds of Yesterday	Lifetime	
May 16	Bessie	HBO	
May 29	Nightingale	HBO	
June 20	A Deadly Adoption	Lifetime	
June 26	Teen Beach 2	Disney Channel	
July 11	7 Days in Hell	HBO	
July 22	Sharknado 3: Oh Hell No!	Syfy	
July 31	Descendants	Disney Channel	
September 26	My Little Pony: Equestria Girls - Friendship Games	Discovery Family	
September 27	CSI: Crime Scene Investigation: Immortality (finale film)	CBS	
October 9	Invisible Sister	Disney Channel	
October 16	Beasts of No Nation	Netflix	
November 2	The Leisure Class	HBO	
November 22	The Lion Guard: Return of the Roar	Disney Channel	
November 25	Regular Show: The Movie	Cartoon Network	
December 3	The Wiz Live!	NBC	
December 4	A Very Murray Christmas	Netflix	
December 11	The Ridiculous Six	Netflix	

=== Returning this year ===
The following shows returned with new episodes after being canceled or ended their run previously:

Show	Last aired	Previous channel	New/returning/same channel	Returning	Source
Oggy and the Cockroaches	1999	Fox Kids	Nickelodeon	February 23	
SpongeBob SquarePants	2014	Nickelodeon	same	March 29	
Are You Smarter than a 5th Grader?	2011	Syndication	Fox	May 26	
BattleBots	2002	Comedy Central	ABC	June 21	
Celebrity Family Feud	2008	NBC	ABC	June 21	
NASCAR on NBC	2006	NBC	same/NBCSN	July 5	
Chain Reaction	2007	GSN	same	July 16	
Punk'd	2012	MTV	BET	August 18	
Project Greenlight	2005	Bravo	HBO	September 13	
Heroes (as Heroes Reborn)	2010	NBC	same	September 24	
Unforgettable	2014	CBS	A&E	November 13	

=== Network changes ===
The following shows aired new episodes on a different network than previous first-run episodes.

Show	Moved from	Moved to	Source
The Mindy Project	Fox	Hulu	
You're the Worst	FX	FXX	
Billy on the Street	Fuse	truTV	
Community	NBC	Yahoo! Screen	
Highly Questionable	ESPN2	ESPN	
Impact Wrestling	Spike	Destination America	
Longmire	A&E	Netflix	
Married at First Sight	fyi	fyi / A&E	
Fox NFL Kickoff	Fox Sports 1	Fox	
Single Ladies	VH1	Centric	
Going Deep with David Rees	National Geographic Channel	Esquire Network	
The Garfield Show	Cartoon Network	Boomerang	
Jay Leno's Garage	NBC.com	CNBC	
Hoarders	A&E	Lifetime	
Ancient Aliens	H2	History	

=== Milestone episodes ===
Show	Network	Episode #	Episode title	Episode air date	Source
Blue Bloods	CBS	100th	"Baggage"	January 9	
Mike & Molly	CBS	100th	"Mike Check"	February 2	
Steve Harvey	Syndicated	500th	N/A	April 27	
My Little Pony: Friendship is Magic	Discovery Family	100th	"Slice of Life"	June 13	
Teen Titans Go!	Cartoon Network	100th	"And the Award for Sound Design Goes to Rob"	July 3	
Melissa & Joey	ABC Family	100th	"Melissa & Joey's Frozen"	July 8	
Winx Club	Nickelodeon	150th	"Stella's Big Party"	September 15	
Family Guy	Fox	250th	"Pilling Them Softly"	September 27	
Power Rangers	Nickelodeon	800th	"Sync or Swim"	October 3	
Grey's Anatomy	ABC	250th	"Guess Who's Coming to Dinner"	October 22	
Adventure Time	Cartoon Network	200th	"Bonnie & Neddy"	November 2	
Cyberchase	PBS	100th	"Fit to be Heroes"	November 9	

=== Ending this year ===
Date	Show	Channel	Debut	Status	Source
January 2	Moyers & Company	PBS	2012	Ended	
January 3	Black Dynamite	Adult Swim	2012	Ended	
January 3	Huckabee (returned in 2017)	Fox News Channel	2008	Ended	
January 22	A to Z	NBC	2014	Cancelled	
January 22	Bad Judge	NBC	2014	Cancelled	
January 22	The Taste	ABC	2013	Cancelled	
January 25	Resurrection	ABC	2014	Cancelled	
January 29	High School USA!	FXX	2013	Cancelled	
January 29	Parenthood	NBC	2010	Ended	
February 7	Red Band Society	Fox	2014	Cancelled	
February 10	Ground Floor	TBS	2013	Cancelled	
February 13	Constantine	NBC	2014	Cancelled	
February 15	Mulaney	Fox	2014	Cancelled	
February 16	State of Affairs	NBC	2014	Cancelled	
February 17	Marry Me	NBC	2014	Cancelled	
February 18	The Mentalist	CBS	2008	Ended	
February 19	Two and a Half Men	CBS	2003	Ended	
February 24	Parks and Recreation (returned in 2020 as A Parks and Recreation Special)	NBC	2009	Ended	
February 27	Ronan Farrow Daily	MSNBC	2014	Cancelled	
February 27	The Reid Report	MSNBC	2014	Cancelled	
March 5	Allegiance	NBC	2015	Cancelled	
March 6	The Queen Latifah Show	Syndication	1999	Cancelled	
March 6	Cristela	ABC	2015	Cancelled	
March 13	Rob Dyrdek's Fantasy Factory	MTV	2009	Ended	
March 16	Eye Candy	MTV	2015	Cancelled	
March 20	Glee	Fox	2009	Ended	
March 24	Kroll Show	Comedy Central	2013	Ended	
March 25	Kickin' It	Disney XD	2011	Ended	
March 27	Hart of Dixie	The CW	2011	Cancelled	
March 27	Let's Ask America	Syndication	2012	Cancelled	
March 28	The Suze Orman Show	CNBC	2002	Ended	
March 31	Cougar Town	TBS	2009	Ended	
April 10	Helix	Syfy	2014	Cancelled	
April 13	Coast Guard Alaska	The Weather Channel	2011	Cancelled	
April 14	Justified (returned in 2023 as Justified: City Primeval)	FX	2010	Ended	
April 14	Brickleberry	Comedy Central	2012	Cancelled	
April 14	Sirens	USA Network	2014	Cancelled	
April 17	The Daily Buzz (returned in 2017)	Broadcast syndication Youtoo America	2002	Cancelled	
April 24	Team Umizoomi	Nickelodeon	2010	Cancelled	
April 28	One Big Happy	NBC	2015	Cancelled	
April 30	Backstrom	Fox	2015	Cancelled	
May 5	Weird Loners	Fox	2015	Cancelled	
May 5	Forever	ABC	2014	Cancelled	
May 10	Revenge	ABC	2011	Cancelled	
May 11	The Returned	A&E	2015	Cancelled	
May 17	Mad Men	AMC	2007	Ended	
May 18	The Following	Fox	2013	Cancelled	
May 18	Stalker	CBS	2014	Cancelled	
May 19	19 Kids and Counting	TLC	2008	Cancelled	
May 20	Late Show with David Letterman	CBS	1993	Ended	
May 24	Battle Creek	CBS	2015	Cancelled	
May 28	Louie	FX	2010	Cancelled	
May 29	Imus in the Morning	FBN	1996	Ended	
June 2	Community	Yahoo! Screen	2009	Cancelled	
June 3	Hot in Cleveland	TV Land	2010	Ended	
June 4	Lucas Bros. Moving Co.	FXX	2013	Cancelled	
June 9	Your Family or Mine	TBS	2015	Cancelled	
June 12	Phineas and Ferb (returned in 2025)	Disney Channel	2007	Ended	
June 25	Axe Cop	FXX	2013	Cancelled	
June 28	Hulk and the Agents of S.M.A.S.H.	Disney XD	2013	Cancelled	
June 28	Nurse Jackie	Showtime	2009	Ended	
July 9	3AM	Showtime	2015	Cancelled	
July 11	The McCarthys	CBS	2014	Cancelled	
July 19	Golan the Insatiable	Fox	2013	Cancelled	
July 20	About a Boy	NBC	2014	Cancelled	
July 28	Knock Knock Live	Fox	2015	Cancelled	
July 31	The Cycle	MSNBC	2012	Cancelled	
July 31	The Ed Show	MSNBC	2009	Cancelled	
July 31	Now with Alex Wagner	MSNBC	2011	Cancelled	
August 2	Degrassi: The Next Generation	TeenNick	2001	Cancelled	
August 5	Melissa & Joey	ABC Family	2010	Cancelled	
August 5	The Game (returned in 2021)	BET	2006	Cancelled	
August 7	WordGirl	PBS Kids	2007	Ended	
August 9	Julius Jr.	Nick Jr.	2013	Cancelled	
August 18	Clipped	TBS	2015	Cancelled	
August 18	Proof	TNT	2015	Cancelled	
August 19	Mr. Robinson	NBC	2015	Cancelled	
August 21	Ice & Coco	Syndication	2015	Cancelled	
August 23	The Brink	HBO	2015	Cancelled	
August 29	Hannibal	NBC	2013	Cancelled	
August 30	Aqua Teen Hunger Force (returned in 2023)	Adult Swim	2000	Ended	
August 30	Falling Skies	TNT	2011	Ended	
August 31	The Whispers	ABC	2015	Cancelled	
September 8	Extreme Weight Loss	ABC	2011	Cancelled	
September 10	Under the Dome	CBS	2013	Cancelled	
September 12	Strawberry Shortcake's Berry Bitty Adventures	The Hub	2010	Ended	
September 16	The Exes	TV Land	2011	Ended	
September 25	Dog with a Blog	Disney Channel	2012	Ended	
September 25	Wake Up with Al	The Weather Channel	2009	Cancelled	
September 27	CSI: Crime Scene Investigation (returned in 2021 as CSI: Vegas)	CBS	2000	Cancelled	
October 5	Significant Mother	The CW	2015	Cancelled	
October 9	Total Drama Island (returned in 2022)	Cartoon Network	2008	Ended	
October 16	Jessie	Disney Channel	2011	Ended	
October 16	I Didn't Do It	Disney Channel	2014	Cancelled	
October 20	Public Morals	TNT	2015	Cancelled	
November 3	Best Time Ever with Neil Patrick Harris	NBC	2015	Cancelled	
November 10	Wicked City	ABC	2015	Cancelled	
November 17	The Bastard Executioner	FX	2015	Cancelled	
November 19	The Player	NBC	2015	Cancelled	
November 30	Minority Report	Fox	2015	Cancelled	
November 30	Henry Hugglemonster	Disney Jr.	2013	Ended	
December 4	America's Next Top Model (returned in 2016)	The CW	2003	Ended	
December 9	The League	FXX	2009	Ended	
December 13	Getting On	HBO	2013	Ended	
December 15	Donny!	USA Network	2015	Cancelled	
December 15	Finding Carter	MTV	2014	Cancelled	
December 15	Manhattan	WGN America	2014	Cancelled	
December 17	Haven	Syfy	2010	Cancelled	
December 18	The Knick	Cinemax	2014	Cancelled	
December 18	The Soup (returned in 2020)	E!	2004	Cancelled	
December 18	Satisfaction	USA Network	2014	Cancelled	
December 19	Instant Mom	TV Land	2013	Ended	
December 26	Da Vinci's Demons	Starz	2013	Cancelled	

=== Entering syndication this year ===
A list of programs (current or canceled) that have accumulated enough episodes (between 65 and 100) or seasons (3 or more) to be eligible for off-network syndication and/or basic cable runs.

Show	Seasons	In Production	Source
2 Broke Girls	4	Yes	
Last Man Standing	4	Yes	
Person of Interest	4	Yes	
Elementary	3	Yes	
New Girl	4	Yes	
Rookie Blue	5	Yes	
Bob's Burgers	5	Yes	
Rizzoli & Isles	6	Yes	
Tosh.0	7	Yes	

== Networks and services ==
=== Launches ===
Network	Type	Launch date	Notes	Source
Pop	Cable television	January 14		
Justice Network	Cable television	January 20		
AccuWeather Network	Cable television	March 10		
HBO Now	OTT streaming	April 7		
Laff	Cable television	April 15		
Decades	Cable television	May 25		
Buzzr	Cable television	June 1		
TBN Salsa	Cable television	June 1		
Showtime (streaming service)	OTT streaming	July 7		
FNL Network	Cable television	August		
Comet	Cable television	October 31		
Toku	Cable television	December 31		

=== Conversions and rebrandings ===
Old network name	New network name	Type	Conversion Date	Notes	Source
ShopHQ	Evine Live	Cable television	Unknown		
MundoFox	MundoMax	Cable television	July 28		
Epix 3	Epix Hits	Cable television	August 31		
YouToo TV	YouToo America	Cable television	Spring		

=== Closures ===
Network	Type	Closure date	Notes	Source
America CV Network	Cable television	Unknown		
DoD News Channel	Cable television	April 17		
FM	Cable television	September 30		
Universal Sports	Cable television	November 16		
Funimation Channel	Cable television	December 31		

== Television stations ==
=== Launches ===
Date	Market	Station	Channel	affiliation	Source
January 2	Quincy, Illinois/Hannibal, Missouri/Keokuk, Iowa	KHQA-DT3	7.3	Grit TV	
May 25	St. Louis, Missouri	KBGU-LP	33.1; 33.2; 33.3	MundoMax (DT1); Estrella TV (DT2); Video Mix TV (DT3)	
May 28	Nashville, Tennessee	WSMV-DT3	4.3	Cozi TV	
June 1	Jonesboro, Arkansas	KJNB-LD	39.1	Fox (primary); CBS (secondary)	
June 12	Jackson, Tennessee	WYJJ-LD3	27.3	Doctor Television Channel (DrTV)	
July 1	Wausau, Wisconsin	WZAW-LD	55.1; 55.2; 55.3	Fox (DT1); MeTV (DT2); Movies! (DT3)	
August 1	Jonesboro, Arkansas	KJNB-LD2	39.2	CBS	
August 1	Jonesboro, Arkansas	KJNE-LP	42.1; 42.2	Fox; CBS	
August 18	Tyler, Texas	KDKJ-LD	27.1; 27.2; 27.3	Estrella TV; Azteca America (DT2); DrTV (DT3)	
September 1	Helena, Montana	KUHM-TV	10.2; 10.3; 10.4; 10.5	PBS Kids (DT2); Create (DT3); World (DT4); TVMT (DT5)	
November 22	Utica, New York	WKTV-DT4	2.4	MeTV (moves from digital channel 2.3; see below section for information)	
November 23	White House/Nashville, Tennessee	WKUW-LD	40.1	DrTV	
December 8	Tyler, Texas	KDKJ-LD	27.4	Buzzr	

=== Network affiliation changes ===
The following is a list of television stations that have made noteworthy network affiliation changes in 2015.

Date	Market	Station	Channel	Prior affiliation	New affiliation	Source
January 1	Atlantic City, New Jersey	WMGM-TV	40.1	NBC	Soul of the South Network	
January 1	Derry/Manchester, New Hampshire/ Boston, Massachusetts	WBIN-TV	50.2	Live Well Network	Antenna TV	
January 1	Indianapolis/Kokomo, Indiana	WTTV/WTTK	4.1/29.1	The CW	CBS	
January 1	Indianapolis	WISH-TV	8.1	CBS	The CW	
January 1	Mayagüez, PR	WORA-TV	5.1	Univision	Telemundo	
January 1	Aguadilla, PR	WOLE-DT	12.1	Telemundo	Univision	
January 16	Milwaukee	WDJT-TV	58.4	TouchVision	Decades	
January 16	New York City	WCBS-TV	2.2	CBS New York Plus	Decades	
January 16	Philadelphia	KYW-TV	3.2	CBS Philly Plus	Decades	
January 26	Casper, Wyoming	KWYF-LD	26.1	The CW	MeTV	
January 26	Casper, Wyoming	KFNB	20.2	None	The CW	
January 26	Jonesboro, Arkansas	KAIT	8.2	Weather	NBC	
February 3	New Bern/Greenville, North Carolina	WCTI-TV	12.2	Live Well Network	Decades	
May 5	Jackson, Tennessee	WYJJ-LD	27.1	Soul of the South (primary)	Antenna TV (primary) (remains secondary MyNetworkTV affiliate)	
June 1	Dallas–Fort Worth	KDFI	27.3	Bounce TV	Buzzr	
June 1	Los Angeles	KCOP-TV	13.2	Bounce TV	Buzzr	
June 1	Orlando	WRBW	65.3	Bounce TV	Buzzr	
June 1	Secaucus, New Jersey/New York City	WWOR-TV	9.3	Bounce TV	Buzzr	
May 27	Alexandria/Nashville, Tennessee	WRTN-LD3	6.3	Cozi TV	Retro TV	
May 30	Nashville, Tennessee	WKRN-DT3	2.3	Live Well Network	Simulcast of station's second subchannel	
June 12	Jackson, Tennessee	WYJJ-LD2	27.2	Doctor Television Channel	Bounce TV (DrTV moves to 27.3)	
July 1	Bryan/College Station, Texas	KYLE-TV	28.1	Fox (as satellite of KWKT-TV)	MyNetworkTV	
July 1	Lafayette, Louisiana	KLAF-LD	46.1	MyNetworkTV	NBC	
July 1	Laredo, Texas	KYLX-LP	13.1	silent	CBS	
July 1	Toccoa–Atlanta	WGTA	32.1; 32.2; 32.3	World/GPB	Heroes & Icons (32.1); Decades (32.2); Movies! (32.3)	
August 10	Fajardo, PR	WRUA	8.1	The Retro Channel	Tiva TV	
September 1	Helena, Montana	KMTF	10.1	The CW	PBS (as KUHM-TV)	
September 11	Alexandria/Nashville, Tennessee	WRTN-LD3	6.3	Retro TV	Antenna TV	
September 21	Nashville, Tennessee	WTVF-DT3	5.3	This TV	Laff	
September 30	Nashville, Tennessee	WRTN-LD5; WRTN-LD6	6.5; 6.6	Tuff TV; Independent (Locally operated movie channel)	Retro TV; This TV	
November 1	Chattanooga, Tennessee	WTVC	9.2	This TV	Fox	
November 1	Chattanooga, Tennessee	WFLI-TV	53.2	MeTV (moves to 53.3)	MyNetworkTV	
November 1	Chattanooga, Tennessee	WDSI-TV	61.1	Fox	This TV	
November 1	Chattanooga, Tennessee	WDSI-TV	61.2	MyNetworkTV	Comet	
November 22	Utica, New York	WKTV	2.2	The CW (via The CW Plus)	CBS	
November 22	Utica, New York	WKTV	2.3	MeTV	The CW (via The CW Plus)	
December 8	Amarillo, Texas	KLKW-LD	22.2	DrTV	GetTV	
December 8	Bowling Green, Kentucky	WCZU-LD	39.2	DrTV	Buzzr	
December 8	Fayetteville, Arkansas	KAJL-LD	16.2	DrTV	Grit	
December 8	Little Rock, Arkansas	KQPS-LD	19.2	DrTV	Laff	
December 8	Lubbock, Texas	KNKC-LD	29.2	DrTV	GetTV	
December 8	Milwaukee, Wisconsin	WTSJ-LP	38.2	Azteca	Buzzr	
December 8	Montgomery, Alabama	WDSF-LD	19.2	DrTV	Buzzr	
December 8	Pittsburg, Kansas–Joplin, Missouri	KPJO-LP	49.2	DrTV	GetTV	
December 8	St. Louis, Missouri	KBGU-LP	33.1	MundoMax	Buzzr	
December 8	Tyler, Texas	KDKJ-LD	27.3	DrTV	GetTV	
December 8	White House/Nashville, Tennessee	WKUW-LD	40.1	DrTV	Buzzr	
December 31	Nashville, Tennessee	WKRN-DT3	2.3	Simulcast of station's second subchannel	Justice Network	

=== Closures ===
Date	Market	Station	Channel	Affiliation	Sign-on date	Source
July 1	Wausau, Wisconsin	WFXS-DT	55.1; 55.2; 55.3	Fox (DT1); MeTV (DT2); Movies! (DT3)	December 1, 1999	
July 1	Laredo, Texas	KVTV	13.1	CBS	December 28, 1973	

== See also ==
- 2015 in the United States
- List of American films of 2015
