= Quiddlers =

Physical comedy group

The Quiddlers are a physical comedy group formed in Southeastern Michigan. They are known to audiences worldwide as "The International Ambassadors of Physical Comedy."

== History ==
The Quiddlers began in the spring of 1986 as a group of five college students and friends in their early 20s under the name "The Marauding Miners." The group first appeared on a public access program called Waterford Tonight, on Comcast Cablevision Channel 45 in Waterford, Michigan. Later that spring, the Miners performed at Eastland Center (a.k.a. Eastland Mall) near Detroit for the production staff of the syndicated game show "Puttin' on the Hits." After winning first place in the day's live competition, the group was invited to appear on the program from the soundstages at Universal Studios in Universal City, near Los Angeles. The Marauding Miners won on Puttin' on the Hits and began to take calls from agents and managers from around the world. The following year, the group performed on the Jerry Lewis Labor Day Telethon for muscular dystrophy, which was broadcast live from Caesars Palace in Las Vegas.

In 1986, two of the original members left the group to continue college and careers. The remaining trio, founder Paul Ebejer, Richard Altman, and Gary Lewis (no relation to Jerry Lewis or his musician son Gary Lewis), decided to rename the group. "The Quiddlers" was chosen randomly by pointing at a word in a pedestal-mounted dictionary in the library of Oakland University, where all three attended. It is defined, essentially, as people who have no real job (in the traditional sense) or means of living. The three agreed that, since they were building a reputation as freelance performers in the New Vaudeville scene, the definition fit perfectly.

From 1986 to 1993, the trio toured extensively and performed on television variety shows, at sporting events and corporate galas, and in live theater venues on five of the six inhabited continents. Notable television appearances included two consecutive shots on NTV's "World's Comical Performers" in Tokyo, Japan, and Random Acts of Variety on Ha!—Ha! would later merge with the Comedy Channel and become known as Comedy Central. The men also performed with the famous French comedian and musician Patrick Sébastien on his hit program "C'est Fou", and appeared in repeats of his "Best of C'est Fou" broadcasts.

In the summer of 1991, The Quiddlers performed in Monaco's elite "Sporting Club" (run by the Société des Bains de Mer, or SBM) as one of three variety acts within a one-hour program of singing and dancing. The Quiddlers were booked for the entire season, along with rotating acts like extreme magician Rudy Coby from LA, seventh-generation circus acrobats, The Nicolodis from Paris, and visual comedian and Montréal native Michel Lauzière. The next summer, they performed in Stuttgart, Germany's "Theatre Varieté" along with Kai Eickermann, an award-winning European breakdancer; Team Rosa, Swedish gymnasts; and the KGB Klowns, a pair of professional clowns from Ukraine who were trained under Soviet rule.

In 1993, Altman and Lewis left the group to pursue other creative careers in writing and graphic design, respectively. Ebejer is still active in theater as a creator and performer of multiple Las Vegas shows. He continues experimenting with designs and themes, and as new roles are created, he calls on several talented people to fill them.

== Currently ==
The latest incarnation of The Quiddlers, under Ebejer's creative direction, is performing in Las Vegas as part of a long-running cabaret show in a major casino resort on the Las Vegas Strip. The troupe also continues to travel the world.

On an episode of I Can Do That, Nicole Scherzinger and Ciara had to dress up as Quiddlers.

== Select appearances ==
This is a short list of appearances made by The Quiddlers (and Marauding Miners) between 1986 and 1993. It is by no means comprehensive.

=== Television ===
- Waterford Tonight | US | Public Access | 1986
- Puttin' On the Hits | US | Syndicated | 1986
- Jerry Lewis Telethon | US | Love Network | 1987
- Puttin' on the Hits | US | Syndicated | 1987 (Different Costumes)
- Funny People | US | NBC | 1988
- Kelly & Co | US | ABC | 1988
- Patrick Sébastien's "C'est Fou" | France | France2 | 1989
- Reserc Al Del Arca | Italy | RAI | 1989
- World's Comical Performers | Japan | NTV | 1989
- Rafaella | Italy | RAI | 1990
- Tutti Frutti | Spain | Telecinco | 1990
- World's Comical Performers | Japan | NTV | 1990
- Montreal Comedy Festival (Juste Pour Rire) | Canada | CBC | 1990
- The Midnight Hour | US | CBS | 1990
- Chicago Auto Show | US | WGN | 1990
- Random Acts of Variety | US | Ha / Comedy Central | 1990
- America's Funniest People | US | ABC | 1991
- Howie (Howie Mandel) | US | CBS | 1992
- Silvester Gala | Germany | 1997
- A Royal Gala - 21 Years of The Prince's Trust | England | 1997
- I Can Do That | US | 2015
- Si può fare! | Italy | 2015
- Për një javë | Albania | 2015
- America's Got Talent | US | 2017

=== Sporting events ===
NBA Halftimes

- Charlotte Hornets (Multiple Appearances)
- Chicago Bulls
- Cleveland Cavaliers (Multiple Appearances)
- Detroit Pistons (Multiple Appearances)
- Houston Rockets
- Indiana Pacers (Multiple Appearances)
- Miami Heat
- Orlando Magic (Multiple Appearances)
- Seattle SuperSonics
- Washington Bullets

CBA Halftimes

- Columbus Horizon (Multiple Appearances)
- Fort Wayne Fury
- Grand Rapids Hoops (Multiple Appearances)
- Idaho Stampede
- La Crosse Catbirds (Multiple Appearances)
- Quad City Thunder (Multiple Appearances)
- Rockford Lightning (Multiple Appearances)
- Sioux Falls Skyforce
- Wichita Falls Texans

GBA Halftimes

- 1992 All-Star Game
- Fayetteville Flyers
- Louisville Shooters
- Michigan Great Lakers

Hockey Games

- Grand Rapids Griffins

=== Live appearances ===
- North American International Auto Show (Detroit) | 1989
- Chicago Auto Show | 1989
- Cleveland International Auto Show | 1989
- New York Auto Show | 1989
- Baltimore Auto Show | 1990
- Dallas Auto Show | 1990
- Multiple Appearances at the Annual "Justé Pour Rire" Montreal Comedy Festival
- Private Function Events for Corporate Groups like General Dynamics, ReMax and Allianze
- Conventions and exhibitions
