= John S. Monagan =

American politician and author

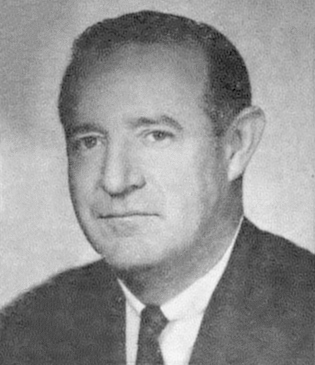

Member of the U.S. House of Representatives from Connecticut's 5th district
- In office January 3, 1959 – January 3, 1973
- Preceded by: James T. Patterson
- Succeeded by: Ronald A. Sarasin

Mayor of Waterbury, Connecticut
- In office 1943–1948
- Preceded by: Vincent A. Scully
- Succeeded by: Raymond E. Snyder

Personal details
- Born: John Stephen Monagan; December 23, 1911 Waterbury, Connecticut, U.S.
- Died: October 23, 2005 (aged 93) Washington D.C., U.S.
- Party: Democratic
- Education: Dartmouth College, Harvard University
- Profession: Lawyer, politician, author

John Stephen Monagan (December 23, 1911 – October 23, 2005) was a Connecticut politician, lawyer, and author.

Monagan graduated from Dartmouth College in 1933, where he majored in French literature and was the editor of the Dartmouth Jack-O-Lantern. He was a Brother of the Dartmouth Chapter of the Alpha Delta Phi. After attending Harvard University law school, he served on the Board of Aldermen in Waterbury, Connecticut and became Mayor of Waterbury in 1943, serving until 1948.

In 1958, he was elected Congressman from a district including Waterbury and served in the House of Representatives from 1959 until 1973, leaving after being defeated for re-election in 1972. After leaving Congress, Monagan practiced as a lawyer in Washington, D.C., and was active in amateur music and in charitable causes. Monagan wrote several books including his memoirs and a biography of Justice Oliver Wendell Holmes Jr., titled The Grand Panjandrum: Mellow Years of Justice Holmes (1988).

He also maintained a decades-long correspondence with the British novelist Anthony Powell. He died in October 2005 after a long illness, at the age of 93. He continued to be active into his nineties as a writer and book reviewer; a month before his death, he spoke at a symposium honoring Anthony Powell's centenary at Georgetown University.

His son-in-law was playwright and theater performer Trav S.D., who was married to his daughter Susan.

The Papers of John S. Monagan at Dartmouth College Library

Political offices
| Preceded by Vincent A. Scully | Mayor of Waterbury, Connecticut; 1943–1948 | Succeeded by Raymond E. Snyder |
U.S. House of Representatives
| Preceded by James T. Patterson | Member of the U.S. House of Representatives from Connecticut's 5th congressional district 1959–1973 | Succeeded by Ronald A. Sarasin |
