= Trav S.D. =

American author, journalist and playwright (born 1965)

- Born: Donald Travis Stewart; 1965 (age 60–61)
- Occupations: Stage actor, director, journalist, author

Donald Travis Stewart (born 1965), known professionally as Trav S.D., is an American author, journalist, playwright and stage performer. He has been called a leading figure in the New Vaudeville and indie theater movements.

== Career ==
Originally from Rhode Island, Trav S.D. started out as a stand-up comedian. He studied at Trinity Rep Conservatory in Providence before moving to New York City in 1988 to self-produce and perform in his own plays.

In 1990, he worked as a personal and administrative assistant to the singer Tony Bennett.

Following two years in the development office of the Big Apple Circus in 1995, Trav S.D. founded the company Mountebanks, a platform for producing original theatre pieces and vaudeville shows through his American Vaudeville Theatre. He first began to attract notice in 1998 as one of a number of Lower East Side "performance comedians" colloquially known as Art Stars, working at alternative night clubs and theatres such as Surf Reality, Collective Unconscious, and The Present Company. In 2001, he was featured in an Adam Gopnik article for The New Yorker about New Burlesque, which led to him writing his first book.

=== Arts journalism ===
In 1999, Trav S.D. began contributing features and reviews to the Village Voice, Time Out New York, and American Theatre (where he was an affiliated writing fellow in 2001, leading the magazine's September 11 coverage). He has also written for the New York Times, The New York Sun, and Reason. From 2006 through 2009, he interviewed over 250 indie theatre artists on the Indie Theatre Now podcast for Nytheatre.com. His "Downtown Theatre" column ran in the NYC Community Media family of papers (The Villager, Chelsea Now, Downtown Express and Gay City News) from 2008 to 2012.

In 2008, Trav S.D. launched the arts and culture blog Travalanche, which features thousands of biographies of vaudeville, burlesque, circus, sideshow, cinema, and radio performers and other show business professionals, as well as related news, reviews, and commentary, endorsed as a resource by Dana Stevens on Slate.com.

=== Author ===
Trav S.D.'s first book, No Applause, Just Throw Money: The Book That Made Vaudeville Famous, was released by Farrar, Straus and Giroux in 2005. It was praised by Bette Midler in People magazine.

This was followed by Chain of Fools: Silent Comedy and Its Legacies from Nickelodeons to Youtube, published by Bear Manor Media in 2013. It was later cited by Jason Zinoman in The New York Times. Trav S.D. next wrote Rose's Royal Midgets and Other Little People of Vaudeville, published by Vaudevisuals Press in 2020. His most recent book, The Marx Brothers Miscellany: A Subjective Appreciation of the World's Greatest Comedy Team, was published by Bear Manor in 2024.

=== Theatre ===
In 2014, Trav S.D. directed and produced the first-ever revival of the Marx Brothers' musical I'll Say She Is, in the New York International Fringe Festival.

Trav S.D.'s original plays, monologues, and variety shows have been produced at Joe's Pub, La Mama, Theater for the New City, Dixon Place, Metropolitan Playhouse, The Brick Theater, and HERE Arts Center. His best known original stage work is Horseplay, a biographical work about Adah Isaacs Menken which starred Molly Pope and Everett Quinton, and was presented at La Mama in 2015. His 2009 musical satire about the Manson Family murders featured Avery Pearson as the lead. Trav S.D.'s playwriting has received the support of MacDowell, the Gerald R. Dodge Foundation, the Anna Sosenko Assist Trust, and the Arch and Bruce Brown Foundation.

As a stage actor, Trav S.D. has appeared in numerous productions with Untitled Theatre Company #61, including the 2006 American premiere of Vaclav Havel's Guardian Angel, Edward Einhorn's 2010 adaptation of Philip K. Dick's Do Androids Dream of Electric Sheep?, and the titular role in 2018's The Resistible Rise of J.R. Brinkley. In 2019, he played the role of David Ferrie in Jason Trachtenburg's off-Broadway play Me and Lee, an original musical about the Kennedy Assassination.

=== Personal ===
Trav S.D. has been married twice. From 1992 to 2008 he was married to Susan Monagan, an arts administrator and daughter of former U.S. Representative John S. Monagan. In 2016, he married illustrator Carolyn Raship.
