= Nytheatre.com =

- Website type: Theatre information and reviews
- Available in: English
- Owner: The New York Theatre Experience, Inc.
- Website: nytheatre.com
- Launched: 1997; 29 years ago

Nytheatre.com was a theatre information and review website founded in 1997. It ended operations in 2017. It was dedicated to reviewing and promoting indie theater in New York City, New York.

== Reviews ==
In 2000, The Washington Post recommended it to "dedicated fans" of live theater.

In 2001, The Salt Lake Tribune wrote that the website makes "sampling Manhattan's amazing cornucopia of theater offerings easier than ever before".

In 2005, Gothamist wrote that "theatre fans have for some time been able to get at least some idea about the next year on stage, and not only the brand-name productions, via the estimable nytheatre.com".

In 2007, the Cincinnati CityBeat called the site "An excellent reference source. It has up-to-date accounts of strike-affected productions, plus an always reliable list of shows outside the theater district. This independent site is free from commercial interest, so you'll get an unfiltered scoop on what's good and what's not."

== Publishing ==
nytheatre.com, through the NYTE Small Press, also published an annual collection of plays called Plays and Playwrights from 2000 through 2011, featuring the work of a number of emerging and established writers whose work has been premiered in New York City. Writers include Chiori Miyagawa, Julia Lee Barclay, Proto-type Theater's Peter S. Petralia, Trav S.D., Ken Urban and Marc Spitz.

This was supplemented by the electronic play publisher Indie Theater Now (2011-2017), which offered a large database of plays that could be downloaded from the site, including works by Kirk Bromley, Edward Einhorn, Ian W. Hill, Nat Cassidy, Jeffrey Sweet, Crystal Skillman and Mac Rogers.

It was edited by Martin Denton.

== See also ==
- Lists of websites
- Culture of New York City
- Theater of the United States
