= James T. Patterson (politician) =

American politician (1908–1989)

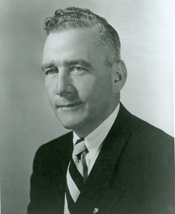

Member of the U.S. House of Representatives from Connecticut's 5th district
- In office January 3, 1947 – January 3, 1959
- Preceded by: Joseph E. Talbot
- Succeeded by: John S. Monagan

Personal details
- Born: October 20, 1908 Naugatuck, Connecticut, U.S.
- Died: February 7, 1989 (aged 80) Camden, New Jersey, U.S.
- Party: Republican
- Education: Georgetown University; University of Miami; National University School of Law

James Thomas Patterson (October 20, 1908 – February 7, 1989) was a U.S. Representative from Connecticut.

Born in Naugatuck, Connecticut, Patterson attended the public schools. He was graduated from Peekskill (New York) Military Academy in 1929 and from Georgetown University, Washington, D.C., in 1933. He was in the University of Miami, Coral Gables, Florida, B.A., in 1934, and from National University Law School (now George Washington University), LL.B., Washington, D.C., 1939. While attending school worked for the Connecticut highway department from 1924 to 1933, U.S. Rubber Company in 1934, for the United States Department of Labor 1934–1937, for the Social Security Board in 1937 and 1938, and for the United States Treasury 1938–1940. He served with the United States Marine Corps and the Office of Strategic Services from September 1941 until discharged as a major in July 1946, with overseas service in the African and European Theaters and in India, Burma, and China.

Patterson was elected as a Republican to the Eightieth and to the five succeeding Congresses (January 3, 1947 – January 3, 1959). He was not the district convention's first choice in 1946. He had not lived in the district since 1934. He was said to have sought the nomination because, after his military service, he needed a job. But the incumbent, who was the convention's choice withdrew, preferring to run for governor, and the convention reconvened and nominated Patterson. A curiosity, it was a Republican district and there were other seekers for the nomination. Maybe it was his high school athletic prowess that recommended him.

Patterson served on the Joint Committee on Atomic Energy. He successfully amended a bill on reactor design, But his primary legislative interest was protectionist tariffs; three of his bills were enacted addressing the manufacturing concerns of his district. He also had two bills enacted addressing veterans services. Patterson voted in favor of the Civil Rights Act of 1957.

He was an unsuccessful candidate for reelection in 1958 to the Eighty-sixth Congress, for election in 1960 to the Eighty-seventh Congress, and in 1970 to the Ninety-second Congress. Patterson opened plumbing supply and builders supply companies in Waterbury. He was a resident of Bethlehem, Connecticut, at his death in Camden, New Jersey, on February 7, 1989.

Party political offices
Preceded by William D. Graham	Republican nominee for Connecticut State Treasurer; 1966	Succeeded by Robert I. Berdon
U.S. House of Representatives
Preceded by Joseph E. Talbot	Member of the U.S. House of Representatives from Connecticut's 5th congressional district 1947–1959	Succeeded by John S. Monagan
