= Married By Mom and Dad =

- Starring: the Sargents the Rollysons the Coultrips the Febiars
- Country of origin: United States
- Original language: English
- No. of seasons: 2
- No. of episodes: 20

Production
- Production company: Thinkfactory Media

Original release
- Network: TLC
- Release: December 13, 2015 – February 5, 2017

Married by Mom and Dad is a reality show on TLC. It premiered on December 13, 2015. It produced two seasons with a total of 20 episodes. Its last show premiered on February 6, 2017.

== Episodes ==
- Episode 1: Meet the Parents premiered on December 13, 2015
- Episode 2: Date My Parents premiered on December 20, 2015
- Episode 3: Cut the Bull$#!% premiered on December 27, 2015
- Episode 4: Cold Feet premiered on January 3, 2016
- Episode 5: Red Flags premiered on January 10, 2016
- Episode 6: I'm Done premiered on January 17, 2016
- Episode 7: The Big Reveal premiered on January 24, 2016
- Episode 8: it's Over premiered on January 31, 2016
- Episode 9: Second Thoughts premiered on February 14, 2016
- Episode 10: Happily Ever After? premiered on February 21, 2016
