= Elaine Parent =

American criminal (1942-2002)

- Born: Elaine Antoinette Parent; August 4, 1942
- Died: April 6, 2002 (aged 59); Panama City, Florida
- Cause of death: Suicide by gunshot
- Other name: The "Chameleon Killer"

Details
- Victims: Beverly Ann McGowan
- Location: St. Lucie County, Florida

Elaine Antoinette Parent (August 4, 1942 - April 6, 2002) was a con woman, identity thief and murderer and one of the most sought female fugitives in the United States during the late 1990s and early 2000s.

She utilized a variety of aliases including Sylvia Ann Hodgkinson, Charlotte Ray Cowan, Ann Tremont and Alice, among others. She also utilized the stolen identities of at least twenty other women during her crimes, including that of her roommate Beverly Ann McGowan, whom Parent had murdered. In the media, Parent was often referred to as the Chameleon Killer on account of the disguises and aliases she employed through her crimes, which lasted until her death by suicide in 2002.

== Early life ==
Many investigators have questioned if "Elaine Parent" was her real given name, or if her nationality was actually American, since no U.S. birth certificate under that identity has ever been found. Parent also claimed, at various points, to have been South African, Australian or even a Soviet exile.

Parent reportedly told acquaintances that she had been born in New York City in 1942 and raised in Illinois during her teenage years. A passport application filed under a slightly different name, Elaine Victoria Parent, claimed Minneapolis as her city of origin and 1946 as her birth year. No verifiable information about Parent's movements during the 1960s are known, and the sole documentation of her criminal activity during the 1970s stemmed from an arrest in Fort Lauderdale, Florida, for shoplifting in 1972.

== Crimes ==
She was wanted for the murder of her potential roommate, Beverly McGowan, a 34-year-old bank clerk. McGowan had placed an ad in the paper looking for a roommate. A woman named "Alice" answered the ad. The woman was actually Parent. Soon after, McGowan disappeared; on July 19, 1990, her remains were found in a rural canal in St. Lucie County, Florida. She had been mutilated – a tattoo cut out of her stomach, she had been decapitated and her hands severed to hinder identification. However, the killer had overlooked another small tattoo, which along with teeth left in her severed head, were enough to positively identify her.

According to investigators, Parent was known to have traveled around the world using more than 20 different identities and was a master of disguise, even at times posing as a man.

The origin of Parent's nickname, the "Chameleon Killer," was a photograph of an oil painting of herself she sent to police with the message "Best wishes: your Chameleon" typed on the back, with the artist's name of Piper, which could have been another one of her aliases. The nickname was apt, as she stole the identities of her victims and was found to have used McGowan's credit cards after she killed her. She also scoured graveyards for names and dates of birth and stole the information of other potential roommates by telling them she was a numerologist, soliciting their Social Security numbers, driver's licences and even birth certificates.

When Florida police caught up with her in Panama City, Florida, on April 6, 2002, she committed suicide by shooting herself in the heart as they stood outside her bedroom door waiting for her to get dressed. There have been concerns that in her time on the run she is likely to have committed other crimes.

== In media ==
Beverly McGowan's murder and the search for Elaine Parent were profiled on Unsolved Mysteries and America's Most Wanted. In 2002, Channel 5 in the United Kingdom aired a special documentary on Parent's criminal career titled The World's Most Wanted Woman. In 2014, she was featured on the Investigation Discovery program Swamp Murders. In 2024, the documentary series, The Hunt for the Chameleon Killer, began airing on True Crime in the United Kingdom and Sundance TV in the United States.
