= I Can Do That (American TV series) =

- Genre: Reality, comedy
- Created by: Armoza Formats
- Presented by: Marlon Wayans
- Country of origin: United States
- No. of seasons: 1
- No. of episodes: 6

Production
- Executive producers: Audrey Morrissey; Avi Armoza; Elwin De Groot; Marlon Wayans; Matilda Zoltowski; Nehama Cohen; Rick Alvarez; Steve Harris
- Running time: 42−44 minutes
- Production companies: Universal Television; Armoza Formats; Live Animals; Open 4 Business Productions

Original release
- Network: NBC
- Release: May 26 – June 30, 2015

I Can Do That is a 2015 American entertainment television series that ran on NBC. It premiered on May 26, 2015, and was broadcast at 10 PM on Tuesday nights. The show was hosted by comedian and actor Marlon Wayans. It was cancelled after one season. Nicole Scherzinger was the winner of the first season.

I Can Do That is based on the original format of the same name, launched by Israeli company Armoza Formats. The format has appeared in over 20 other countries. The show's theme song is "Can You Do This" by Aloe Blacc.

== Overview ==
Six entertainers attempt to perform the acts of notable entertainers in various fields (singing, dancing, acrobatics, magic, etc.), with help from the original performers. The public votes on which was the best re-enacted act each week; the first-place finisher(s) get three points, second place gets two points, and third place gets one point. At the end of six weeks, the celebrity with the most points earns a trophy and the title of "The Greatest Entertainer". On July 2, 2015, NBC renewed the series for a second season.

== Contestants ==
- Nicole Scherzinger, singer, lead singer of The Pussycat Dolls, dancer, and actress
- Cheryl Burke, dancer, and choreographer on Dancing with the Stars
- Ciara, singer, dancer, and actress
- Jeff Dye, stand-up comedian from Last Comic Standing 6
- Joe Jonas, lead singer of the Jonas Brothers and DNCE, and actor
- Alan Ritchson, actor and singer

== Episodes ==
No.	Title	Original release date	U.S. viewers (millions)
1	"The Harlem Globetrotters, Penn and Teller, Airealistic"	May 26, 2015	6.40
Nicole & Alan - AiRealistic - 3 points; Jeff & Cheryl - Harlem Globetrotters - 2 points; Joe & Ciara - Penn & Teller - 1 point
2	"Jabbawockeez, Christian and Scooby, The Quiddlers"	June 2, 2015	5.49
Joe & Cheryl - Jabbawockeez - 3 points; Alan & Jeff - Christian & Scooby - 2 points; Nicole & Ciara - Quiddlers - 1 point
3	"Blue Man Group, Double Dutch, Ben Blaque"	June 9, 2015	5.59
Alan & Joe - Blue Man Group - 2 points; Ciara & Cheryl - Double Dutch - 3 points; Jeff & Nicole - Ben Blaque - 2 points
4	"Board Breakers, Avenue Q, Pilobolus"	June 16, 2015	4.42
Jeff & Cheryl - Pilobolus - 3 points; Ciara & Alan - JAM Performance Team (Board Breakers) - 1 point; Nicole & Joe - Avenue Q - 2 points
5	"Burn the Floor, Skating Aratas, Grounded Aerial"	June 23, 2015	4.93
Jeff & Ciara - Burn the Floor - 1 point; Nicole & Joe - Skating Aratas - 3 points; Alan & Cheryl - Grounded Aerial - 2 points
6	"Snoop Dogg, The Dallas Cowboys Cheerleaders, Tell-A-Vision"	June 30, 2015	5.07
Jeff & Joe - Snoop Dogg - 2 points; Cheryl & Nicole - Dallas Cowboys Cheerleaders - 3 points; Alan & Ciara - Tell A Vision - 1 point Supergroups: Cheryl, Jeff & Ciara - 0 points; Nicole, Joe & Alan - 3 points

== Scoreboard ==
Place	Celebrity	Weeks							Total Score
Place	Celebrity	Week 1	Week 2	Week 3	Week 4	Week 5	Week 6		Total Score
1	Nicole Scherzinger	1st	3rd	2nd^{1}	2nd	1st	1st	W^{2}	17
2	Cheryl Burke	2nd	1st	1st	1st	2nd	1st	L^{2}	16
2	Joe Jonas	3rd	1st	2nd^{1}	2nd	1st	2nd	W^{2}	16
4	Alan Ritchson	1st	2nd	2nd^{1}	3rd	2nd	3rd	W^{2}	14
5	Jeff Dye	2nd	2nd	2nd^{1}	1st	3rd	2nd	L^{2}	12
6	Ciara	3rd	3rd	1st	3rd	3rd	3rd	L^{2}	8

== International versions ==
Country	Title	Network	Host	Year aired
Israel (original version)	I can do that!	Channel 2 (Keshet)	Yaron Brovinsky	2014
Albania	Ne nje jave	Top Channel	Arbana Osmani	2015
Bulgaria	И аз го мога	Nova TV	Stanimir Gamov	2015
Brazil	Isso eu faço! (part of Hora do Faro)	RecordTV	Rodrigo Faro	2014
Colombia	Qué camello	Caracol Televisión	Santiago Rodriguez	2016 – 2017
Croatia	Ja to mogu!	HRT 1	Barbara Kolar	2015 – 2016
Ecuador	Que camello	Ecuavisa	?	October 2015
Finland	Pidämme Show	MTV3	?	2015
Germany	I can do that!	ZDF	Steven Gӓtjen	2016
Hungary	Csak show és más semmi!	TV2	Claudia Liptai and Nóra Ördög	2018
India	I can do that	Zee TV	Farhan Akhtar	2015
Italy	Si può fare!	Rai 1	Carlo Conti	2014 – 2015
Lithuania	Aš galiu!	LNK	Inga Jankauskaitė and Mantas Stonkus	2016
Mexico	¡Sí se puede!	Azteca Trece	Rafael Araneda	2015
Philippines	I can do that!	ABS-CBN	Robi Domingo and Alex Gonzaga	2017
Portugal	Desafio total	RTP 1	Silvia Alberto and Marco Horácio	2014
Russia	Я cмoгy!	Rossiya 1	Timur Rodriguez and Vladimir Stognienko	2014
Singapore	I Can do That!	Channel 5	?	2014
Spain	Eso lo hago yo	laSexta	Carlos Sobera	2016
United States (Spanish)	¡Sí se puede!	Telemundo	Rafael Araneda	2015
Vietnam	Tôi có thể	HTV7	Minh Xù	2017

== Notes ==
1. Both Jeff & Nicole's and Joe & Alan's acts received the same number of audience votes, so both placed second in Week 3 and received two points.
2. All six celebrities were divided into two teams of three for one final performance consisting of all the performances done over the course of the competition. The team of three that received the most audience votes, won three extra points. The team of Nicole, Joe & Alan was revealed to have the most votes and received three points, while the team of Cheryl, Jeff & Ciara received 0 points.
