= New Vaudeville =

New Vaudeville was a movement of loosely associated acts during the 1970s and 1980s who drew on the traditions of vaudeville and carnivals.

Acts associated with the movement included Bill Irwin, The Flying Karamazov Brothers, Trav S.D., and Avner the Eccentric.

The clown Bob Berky described New Vaudeville as "theater with the fourth wall down", as performers tend to address the audience from the beginning of a performance and to draw members onto the stage as participants.

Penn & Teller were often included in discussions of New Vaudeville, a connection they flatly rejected, with Penn Jillette referring to the New Vaudevillians as "a bunch of aging hippies looking at old pictures of W. C. Fields."
