= 2014–15 United States network television schedule =

Television schedule for the fall of 2014

The 2014–15 network television schedule for the five major English-language commercial broadcast networks in the United States covers prime time hours from September 2014 to August 2015. The schedule is followed by a list per network of returning series, new series, and series canceled after the 2013–14 season.

NBC was the first to announce its fall schedule on May 11, 2014, followed by Fox on May 12, 2014, ABC on May 13, 2014, CBS on May 14, 2014 and The CW on May 15, 2014.

PBS is not included; member stations have local flexibility over most of their schedules and broadcast times for network shows may vary. Ion Television, The CW Plus, and MyNetworkTV are also not included since the majority of the networks' schedules comprise syndicated reruns (with limited original programming on the latter two). The CW is not included on weekends, since it does not offer network programming.

New series are highlighted in bold.

All times are U.S. Eastern and Pacific time (except for some live events or specials). Subtract one hour for Central and Mountain times.

Each of the 30 highest-rated shows is listed with its rank and rating as determined by Nielsen Media Research.

== Legend ==
- Light blue indicates local programming.
- Gray indicates encore programming.
- Blue-gray indicates news programming.
- Light green indicates live sporting events.
- Light purple indicates movies.
- Red indicates series being burned off and other irregularly scheduled programs, including specials.
- Yellow indicates the top-10 most watched programs of the season
- Cyan indicates the top-20 most watched programs of the season
- Magenta indicates the top-30 most watched programs of the season

== Sunday ==
Network		7:00 p.m.	7:30 p.m.	8:00 p.m.	8:30 p.m.	9:00 p.m.	9:30 p.m.	10:00 p.m.	10:30 p.m.
ABC	Fall	America's Funniest Home Videos		Once Upon a Time		Resurrection		Revenge	
ABC	Winter	America's Funniest Home Videos		**Galavant**		Resurrection		Revenge	
ABC	Spring	America's Funniest Home Videos		Once Upon a Time		**Secrets and Lies**		Revenge	
ABC	Summer	America's Funniest Home Videos		Celebrity Family Feud		**BattleBots**		Castle (R)	
ABC	Late summer	America's Funniest Home Videos		Bachelor in Paradise				**Save My Life:** **Boston Trauma**	
CBS	Fall	NFL on CBS	60 Minutes (17/7.8) (Tied with Grey's Anatomy and Hawaii Five-0)		**Madam Secretary** (8/9.0) (Tied with Criminal Minds and Scandal)		The Good Wife (16/8.1)		CSI: Crime; Scene; Investigation (continued until 11:30 p.m.) (28/7.2) (Tied with Castle and CSI: Cyber)
CBS	Late fall	NFL on CBS	60 Minutes (17/7.8) (Tied with Grey's Anatomy and Hawaii Five-0)		Undercover Boss		The Mentalist (25/7.3) (Tied with Elementary and Mom)		CSI: Crime; Scene; Investigation (continued until 11:30 p.m.) (28/7.2) (Tied with Castle and CSI: Cyber)
CBS	Winter	60 Minutes (17/7.8) (Tied with Grey's Anatomy and Hawaii Five-0)		**Madam Secretary** (8/9.0) (Tied with Criminal Minds and Scandal)		The Good Wife (16/8.1)		CSI: Crime Scene; Investigation (28/7.2) (Tied with Castle and CSI: Cyber)	
CBS	Spring	60 Minutes (17/7.8) (Tied with Grey's Anatomy and Hawaii Five-0)		**Madam Secretary** (8/9.0) (Tied with Criminal Minds and Scandal)		The Good Wife (16/8.1)		**Battle Creek**	
CBS	Summer	60 Minutes (17/7.8) (Tied with Grey's Anatomy and Hawaii Five-0)		Big Brother		**Madam Secretary** (R)		CSI: Crime Scene; Investigation (R)	
Fox	Fall	Fox NFL	Bob's Burgers	The Simpsons	Brooklyn Nine-Nine	Family Guy	**Mulaney**	Local programming	
Fox	Late fall	Fox NFL	**Mulaney**	The Simpsons	Brooklyn Nine-Nine	Family Guy	Bob's Burgers	Local programming	
Fox	Winter	**Mulaney**	The Simpsons (R)	The Simpsons	Brooklyn Nine-Nine	Family Guy	Bob's Burgers	Local programming	
Fox	Spring	The Simpsons (R)	Bob's Burgers	The Simpsons	Brooklyn Nine-Nine	Family Guy	**The Last Man** **on Earth**	Local programming	
Fox	Summer	Bob's Burgers (R)	Bob's Burgers	The Simpsons	Brooklyn Nine-Nine	Family Guy	**Golan the** **Insatiable**	Local programming	
Fox	Late summer	Bob's Burgers (R)	Bob's Burgers	The Simpsons	Brooklyn Nine-Nine	Family Guy	**The Last Man** **on Earth** (R)	Local programming	
NBC	Fall	Football Night in America		NBC Sunday Night Football (8:20 p.m.) (continued to game completion) (1/12.3)					
NBC	Winter	Encore programming				Dateline NBC			
NBC	Spring	Dateline NBC				**A.D. The Bible Continues**		**American Odyssey**	
NBC	Summer	Hollywood Game Night (R)		Welcome to Sweden		American Ninja Warrior (R)			
NBC	Late summer	Encore programming		Hollywood Game Night (R)		American Ninja Warrior (R)			

Note: NBC’s Mission Control was originally scheduled to air in 2015 as a summer entry at 8:30, but was canceled.

== Monday ==
Network		8:00 PM	8:30 PM	9:00 PM	9:30 PM	10:00 PM	10:30 PM
ABC	Fall	Dancing with the Stars (7/9.7)				Castle (28/7.2) (Tied with CSI: Crime Scene Investigation and CSI: Cyber)	
ABC	Late fall	The Great Christmas Light Fight				Castle (28/7.2) (Tied with CSI: Crime Scene Investigation and CSI: Cyber)	
ABC	Winter	The Bachelor				Castle (28/7.2) (Tied with CSI: Crime Scene Investigation and CSI: Cyber)	
ABC	Spring	Dancing with the Stars (7/9.7)				Castle (28/7.2) (Tied with CSI: Crime Scene Investigation and CSI: Cyber)	
ABC	Summer	The Bachelorette				**The Whispers**	
ABC	Late summer	Bachelor in Paradise		**Bachelor in Paradise: After Paradise**		**The Whispers**	
CBS	Fall	The Big Bang Theory (2/11.6) (Tied with NCIS)	The Big Bang Theory (R)	**Scorpion** (14/8.4)		NCIS: Los Angeles (22/7.6)	
CBS	Late fall	2 Broke Girls	The Millers	**Scorpion** (14/8.4)		NCIS: Los Angeles (22/7.6)	
CBS	Winter	2 Broke Girls	Mike & Molly	**Scorpion** (14/8.4)		NCIS: Los Angeles (22/7.6)	
CBS	Spring	2 Broke Girls	Mike & Molly	**Stalker**		NCIS: Los Angeles (22/7.6)	
CBS	Summer	2 Broke Girls	Mike & Molly	**Scorpion** (R)		NCIS: Los Angeles (22/7.6)	
CBS	Late summer	2 Broke Girls	**The Odd Couple** (R)	**Scorpion** (R)		NCIS: Los Angeles (22/7.6)	
The CW	Fall	The Originals		**Jane the Virgin**		Local programming	
The CW	Winter	The Originals		**Jane the Virgin**		Local programming	
The CW	Spring	The Originals		**Jane the Virgin**		Local programming	
The CW	Summer	Penn & Teller: Fool Us		Whose Line Is It Anyway?	**Cedric's Barber Battle**	Local programming	
The CW	Late summer	Penn & Teller: Fool Us		Whose Line Is It Anyway?	**Significant Mother**	Local programming	
Fox	Fall	**Gotham**		Sleepy Hollow		Local programming	
Fox	Winter	**Gotham**		Sleepy Hollow		Local programming	
Fox	Spring	**Gotham**		The Following		Local programming	
Fox	Summer	So You Think You Can Dance				Local programming	
NBC	Fall	The Voice (13/8.5)				The Blacklist (12/8.7)	
NBC	Late fall	The Voice (13/8.5)				**State of Affairs**	
NBC	Winter	The Apprentice				**State of Affairs**	
NBC	Spring	The Voice (13/8.5)				The Night Shift	
NBC	Summer	American Ninja Warrior				**The Island**	
NBC	Late summer	American Ninja Warrior				Running Wild with Bear Grylls	

== Tuesday ==
Network		8:00 PM	8:30 PM	9:00 PM	9:30 PM	10:00 PM	10:30 PM
ABC	Fall	**Selfie**	**Manhattan Love Story**	Agents of S.H.I.E.L.D.		**Forever**	
ABC	Late fall	Encore programming		Agents of S.H.I.E.L.D.		**Forever**	
ABC	Winter	**Fresh Off the Boat**	**Repeat After Me**	**Agent Carter**		**Forever**	
ABC	Spring	**Fresh Off the Boat**	**Repeat After Me**	Agents of S.H.I.E.L.D.		**Forever**	
ABC	Late spring	Dancing with the Stars (7/9.7)		Agents of S.H.I.E.L.D.		**Forever**	
ABC	Summer	**Fresh Off the Boat** (R)	**Black-ish** (R)	Extreme Weight Loss			
CBS	Fall	NCIS (2/11.6) (Tied with The Big Bang Theory)		**NCIS: New Orleans** (4/11.3)		Person of Interest (20/7.7) (Tied with How to Get Away with Murder)	
CBS	Winter	NCIS (2/11.6) (Tied with The Big Bang Theory)		**NCIS: New Orleans** (4/11.3)		Person of Interest (20/7.7) (Tied with How to Get Away with Murder)	
CBS	Spring	NCIS (2/11.6) (Tied with The Big Bang Theory)		**NCIS: New Orleans** (4/11.3)		Person of Interest (20/7.7) (Tied with How to Get Away with Murder)	
CBS	Summer	NCIS (2/11.6) (Tied with The Big Bang Theory)		**Zoo**		**NCIS: New Orleans** (R)	
The CW	Fall	**The Flash**		Supernatural		Local Programming	
The CW	Winter	**The Flash**		Supernatural		Local Programming	
The CW	Spring	**The Flash**		**iZombie**		Local Programming	
The CW	Summer	**The Flash**		**iZombie**		Local Programming	
Fox	Fall	**Utopia**		New Girl	The Mindy Project	Local Programming	
Fox	Mid-fall	Encore programming		New Girl	The Mindy Project	Local Programming	
Fox	Late fall	MasterChef Junior		New Girl	The Mindy Project	Local Programming	
Fox	Winter	MasterChef Junior		New Girl	The Mindy Project	Local Programming	
Fox	Spring	Hell's Kitchen		New Girl	The Mindy Project	Local Programming	
Fox	Mid-spring	Hell's Kitchen		New Girl	**Weird Loners**	Local Programming	
Fox	Summer	Are You Smarter than a 5th Grader?		Hell's Kitchen		Local Programming	
Fox	Mid-summer	Are You Smarter than a 5th Grader?		**Knock Knock Live**		Local Programming	
Fox	Late summer	Are You Smarter than a 5th Grader?		Brooklyn Nine-Nine (R)	**The Last Man on Earth** (R)	Local Programming	
NBC	Fall	The Voice (15/8.3)		**Marry Me**	About a Boy	Chicago Fire	
NBC	Winter	Parks and Recreation		**Marry Me**	About a Boy	Chicago Fire	
NBC	Spring	The Voice (15/8.3)		Undateable	**One Big Happy**	Chicago Fire	
NBC	Summer	America's Got Talent				**I Can Do That**	
NBC	Late summer	America's Got Talent				Hollywood Game Night	

== Wednesday ==
Network		8:00 PM	8:30 PM	9:00 PM	9:30 PM	10:00 PM	10:30 PM
ABC	Fall	The Middle	The Goldbergs	Modern Family (23/7.5) (Tied with Two and a Half Men)	**Black-ish**	Nashville	
ABC	Winter	The Middle	The Goldbergs	Modern Family (23/7.5) (Tied with Two and a Half Men)	**Black-ish**	Nashville	
ABC	Spring	The Middle	The Goldbergs	Modern Family (23/7.5) (Tied with Two and a Half Men)	**Black-ish**	Nashville	
ABC	Summer	**500 Questions**		Modern Family (23/7.5) (Tied with Two and a Half Men)	**Black-ish**	Celebrity Wife Swap	
ABC	Late summer	The Middle (R)	The Goldbergs (R)	Modern Family (23/7.5) (Tied with Two and a Half Men)	**Black-ish**	Celebrity Wife Swap	
CBS	Fall	Survivor: San Juan del Sur – Blood vs. War		Criminal Minds (8/9.0) (Tied with Madam Secretary and Scandal)		**Stalker**	
CBS	Winter	The Mentalist (25/7.3) (Tied with Elementary and Mom)		Criminal Minds (8/9.0) (Tied with Madam Secretary and Scandal)		**Stalker**	
CBS	Spring	Survivor: Worlds Apart		Criminal Minds (8/9.0) (Tied with Madam Secretary and Scandal)		**CSI: Cyber** (28/7.2) (Tied with Castle and CSI: Crime Scene Investigation)	
CBS	Late spring	**The Briefcase**		Criminal Minds (8/9.0) (Tied with Madam Secretary and Scandal)		**CSI: Cyber** (28/7.2) (Tied with Castle and CSI: Crime Scene Investigation)	
CBS	Summer	Big Brother		Criminal Minds (8/9.0) (Tied with Madam Secretary and Scandal)		Extant	
CBS	Late summer	Big Brother		Extant		Criminal Minds (R)	
The CW	Fall	Arrow		The 100		Local Programming	
The CW	Winter	Arrow		The 100		Local Programming	
The CW	Spring	Arrow		Supernatural		Local Programming	
The CW	Summer	America's Next Top Model		**A Wicked Offer**		Local Programming	
Fox	Fall	Hell's Kitchen		**Red Band Society**		Local Programming	
Fox	Winter	American Idol		**Empire** (5/10.9)		Local Programming	
Fox	Spring	American Idol				Local Programming	
Fox	Summer	MasterChef		**Bullseye**		Local Programming	
Fox	Late summer	MasterChef		**Home Free**		Local Programming	
NBC	Fall	**The Mysteries of Laura**		Law & Order: Special Victims Unit		Chicago P.D.	
NBC	Winter	**The Mysteries of Laura**		Law & Order: Special Victims Unit		Chicago P.D.	
NBC	Spring	**The Mysteries of Laura**		Law & Order: Special Victims Unit		Chicago P.D.	
NBC	Summer	America's Got Talent		**Mr. Robinson**		Last Comic Standing	
NBC	Late summer	America's Got Talent		**The Carmichael Show**		Last Comic Standing	

== Thursday ==
Network		8:00 PM	8:30 PM	9:00 PM	9:30 PM	10:00 PM	10:30 PM
ABC	Fall	Grey's Anatomy (17/7.8) (Tied with 60 Minutes and Hawaii Five-0)		Scandal (8/9.0) (Tied with Criminal Minds and Madam Secretary)		**How to Get Away with Murder** (20/7.7) (Tied with Person of Interest)	
ABC	Late fall	The Taste				**How to Get Away with Murder** (20/7.7) (Tied with Person of Interest)	
ABC	Winter	Grey's Anatomy (17/7.8) (Tied with 60 Minutes and Hawaii Five-0)		Scandal (8/9.0) (Tied with Criminal Minds and Madam Secretary)		**How to Get Away with Murder** (20/7.7) (Tied with Person of Interest)	
ABC	Spring	Grey's Anatomy (17/7.8) (Tied with 60 Minutes and Hawaii Five-0)		Scandal (8/9.0) (Tied with Criminal Minds and Madam Secretary)		**American Crime**	
ABC	Late spring	**500 Questions**		Encore programming			
ABC	Summer	**The Astronaut Wives Club**		Mistresses		Rookie Blue	
CBS	Fall	**NFL Thursday Night Kickoff**	**Thursday Night Football** (continued to game completion) (6/10.6)				
CBS	Late fall	The Big Bang Theory (2/11.6) (Tied with NCIS)	Mom (25/7.3) (Tied with Elementary and The Mentalist)	Two and a Half Men (23/7.5) (Tied with Modern Family)	**The McCarthys**	Elementary (25/7.3) (Tied with The Mentalist and Mom)	
CBS	Winter	The Big Bang Theory (2/11.6) (Tied with NCIS)	**The Odd Couple**	The Big Bang Theory (R)	Mom (25/7.3) (Tied with Elementary and The Mentalist)	Elementary (25/7.3) (Tied with The Mentalist and Mom)	
CBS	Spring	The Big Bang Theory (2/11.6) (Tied with NCIS)	**The Odd Couple**	Mom (25/7.3) (Tied with Elementary and The Mentalist)	The Big Bang Theory (R)	Elementary (25/7.3) (Tied with The Mentalist and Mom)	
CBS	Summer	The Big Bang Theory (2/11.6) (Tied with NCIS)	Mom (R)	Big Brother		Under the Dome	
The CW	Fall	The Vampire Diaries		Reign		Local programming	
The CW	Winter	The Vampire Diaries		Reign		Local programming	
The CW	Spring	The Vampire Diaries		Reign		Local programming	
The CW	Summer	Beauty & the Beast		Encore programming		Local programming	
The CW	Mid-summer	Beauty & the Beast		**Dates**		Local programming	
The CW	Late summer	Beauty & the Beast		Encore programming		Local programming	
Fox	Fall	Bones		**Gracepoint**		Local programming	
Fox	Winter	American Idol		**Backstrom**		Local programming	
Fox	Spring	Bones		**Backstrom**		Local programming	
Fox	Late spring	Bones		**Wayward Pines**		Local programming	
Fox	Summer	**Boom!**		**Wayward Pines**		Local programming	
Fox	Late summer	**Boom!**		Bones (R)		Local programming	
NBC	Fall	The Biggest Loser: Glory Days				Parenthood	
NBC	October	The Biggest Loser: Glory Days		**Bad Judge**	**A to Z**	Parenthood	
NBC	Winter	**The Slap**		The Blacklist (12/8.7)		**Allegiance**	
NBC	Spring	Dateline NBC		The Blacklist (12/8.7)		**The Slap**	
NBC	Late spring	Encore programming		The Blacklist (12/8.7)		Dateline NBC	
NBC	Summer	Food Fighters		**Aquarius**		Hannibal	
NBC	Late summer	Food Fighters		Dateline NBC			

== Friday ==
Network		8:00 PM	8:30 PM	9:00 PM	9:30 PM	10:00 PM	10:30 PM
ABC	Fall	Last Man Standing	**Cristela**	Shark Tank		20/20	
ABC	Winter	Last Man Standing	**Cristela**	Shark Tank		20/20	
ABC	Spring	Shark Tank		**Beyond the Tank**		20/20	
ABC	Summer	Shark Tank		Primetime: What Would You Do?		20/20	
CBS	Fall	The Amazing Race		Hawaii Five-0 (17/7.8) (Tied with 60 Minutes and Grey's Anatomy)		Blue Bloods (11/8.8)	
CBS	Winter	Undercover Boss		Hawaii Five-0 (17/7.8) (Tied with 60 Minutes and Grey's Anatomy)		Blue Bloods (11/8.8)	
CBS	Spring	The Amazing Race		Hawaii Five-0 (17/7.8) (Tied with 60 Minutes and Grey's Anatomy)		Blue Bloods (11/8.8)	
CBS	Summer	Undercover Boss		Hawaii Five-0 (17/7.8) (Tied with 60 Minutes and Grey's Anatomy)		Blue Bloods (11/8.8)	
The CW	Fall	Whose Line Is It Anyway?	Whose Line Is It Anyway? (R)	America's Next Top Model		Local programming	
The CW	Winter	Hart of Dixie		Masters of Illusion		Local programming	
The CW	Spring	**Cedric's Barber Battle**	Whose Line Is It Anyway?	**The Messengers**		Local programming	
The CW	Late spring	Whose Line Is It Anyway?	Whose Line Is It Anyway? (R)	**The Messengers**		Local programming	
The CW	Summer	Masters of Illusion	Whose Line Is It Anyway? (R)	**The Messengers**		Local programming	
Fox	Fall	**Utopia**		**Gotham** (R)		Local programming	
Fox	Late fall	MasterChef Junior (R)		**Gotham** (R)		Local programming	
Fox	Winter	**World's Funniest Fails**		Glee		Local programming	
Fox	Spring	Fox Presents				Local programming	
Fox	Summer	MasterChef (R)		**Gotham** (R)		Local programming	
NBC	Fall	Encore programming		Dateline NBC			
NBC	Mid-fall	Dateline NBC		Grimm		**Constantine**	
NBC	Winter	**Constantine**		Grimm		Dateline NBC	
NBC	Spring	Grimm		Dateline NBC		Dateline NBC	
NBC	Summer	America's Got Talent (R)				Dateline NBC	

== Saturday ==
Network		8:00 PM	8:30 PM	9:00 PM	9:30 PM	10:00 PM	10:30 PM
ABC	Fall	Saturday Night Football (continued to game completion)					
ABC	Winter	ABC Saturday Movie of the Week					
ABC	Spring	Encore programming		**In an Instant**			
ABC	Summer	Encore programming				**Boston EMS**	
CBS	Fall	Crimetime Saturday				48 Hours	
CBS	Winter	Crimetime Saturday				48 Hours	
CBS	Spring	Crimetime Saturday				48 Hours	
CBS	Summer	The Millers		**The McCarthys**		48 Hours	
CBS	Late summer	Crimetime Saturday				48 Hours	
Fox	Fall	Fox College Football (continued to game completion)					
Fox	Winter	Encore programming		**Red Band Society**		Local programming	
Fox	Spring	Encore programming		**Red Band Society**		Local programming	
Fox	Summer	Baseball Night in America				Local programming	
Fox	Late summer	Encore programming				Local programming	
NBC	Fall	Encore programming				**SNL Vintage**	
NBC	Winter	Encore programming				**SNL Vintage**	
NBC	Spring	NHL on NBC (continued to game completion)					
NBC	Summer	Running Wild with Bear Grylls (R)		**Aquarius**		Hannibal	

== By network ==
=== ABC ===
Returning series:

- 20/20
- ABC Saturday Movie of the Week
- Agents of S.H.I.E.L.D.
- America's Funniest Home Videos
- The Bachelor
- Bachelor in Paradise
- The Bachelorette
- BattleBots (moved from Comedy Central)
- Castle
- Celebrity Family Feud (moved from NBC)
- Celebrity Wife Swap
- Dancing with the Stars
- Extreme Weight Loss
- The Goldbergs
- The Great Christmas Light Fight
- Grey's Anatomy
- Last Man Standing
- The Middle
- Mistresses
- Modern Family
- Nashville
- Once Upon a Time
- Resurrection
- Revenge
- Rookie Blue
- Scandal
- Shark Tank
- The Taste
- What Would You Do?

New series:

- **20/20: In an Instant** *
- **500 Questions** *
- **Bachelor in Paradise: After Paradise** *
- **Agent Carter** *
- **American Crime** *
- **The Astronaut Wives Club** *
- **Beyond the Tank** *
- **Black-ish**
- **Boston EMS** *
- **Cristela**
- **Forever**
- **Fresh Off the Boat** *
- **Galavant** *
- **How to Get Away with Murder**
- **Manhattan Love Story**
- **Repeat After Me** *
- **Save My Life: Boston Trauma** *
- **Secrets and Lies** *
- **Selfie**
- **The Whispers** *

Not returning from 2013–14:

- The Assets
- Back in the Game
- Bet on Your Baby
- Betrayal
- Black Box
- Killer Women
- Lucky 7
- Motive (moved to USA Network)
- Mind Games
- Mixology
- The Neighbors
- NY Med
- Once Upon a Time in Wonderland
- Rising Star
- Suburgatory
- Super Fun Night
- Trophy Wife
- Wipeout (revived by TBS in 2021)

=== CBS ===
Returning series:

- 2 Broke Girls
- 48 Hours
- 60 Minutes
- The Amazing Race
- The Big Bang Theory
- Big Brother
- Blue Bloods
- Criminal Minds
- CSI: Crime Scene Investigation
- Elementary
- Extant
- The Good Wife
- Hawaii Five-0
- The Mentalist
- Mike & Molly
- The Millers
- Mom
- NCIS
- NCIS: Los Angeles
- Person of Interest
- Survivor
- Thursday Night Football (moved from NFL Network)
- Two and a Half Men
- Under the Dome
- Undercover Boss

New series:

- **Battle Creek** *
- **The Briefcase** *
- **CSI: Cyber** *
- **The Dovekeepers** *
- **Madam Secretary**
- **The McCarthys**
- **NCIS: New Orleans**
- **The Odd Couple** *
- **Scorpion**
- **Stalker**
- **Zoo** *

Not returning from 2013–14:

- Bad Teacher
- The Crazy Ones
- Friends with Better Lives
- Hostages
- How I Met Your Mother
- Intelligence
- Reckless
- Unforgettable (moved to A&E)
- We Are Men

=== The CW ===
Returning series:

- The 100
- America's Next Top Model
- Arrow
- Beauty & the Beast
- Hart of Dixie
- Masters of Illusion
- The Originals
- Penn & Teller: Fool Us
- Reign
- Supernatural
- The Vampire Diaries
- Whose Line Is It Anyway?

New series:

- **A Wicked Offer** *
- **Cedric's Barber Battle** *
- **Dates** *
- **The Flash**
- **iZombie** *
- **Jane the Virgin**
- **The Messengers** *
- **Significant Mother** *

Not returning from 2013–14:

- Backpackers
- The Carrie Diaries
- Famous in 12
- Nikita
- Seed
- Star-Crossed
- The Tomorrow People

=== Fox ===
Returning series:

- American Idol
- Are You Smarter Than a 5th Grader?
- Bob's Burgers
- Bones
- Brooklyn Nine-Nine
- Family Guy
- The Following
- Fox College Football
- Glee
- Hell's Kitchen
- MasterChef
- MasterChef Junior
- The Mindy Project
- New Girl
- NFL on Fox
- The Simpsons
- Sleepy Hollow
- So You Think You Can Dance

New series:

- **Backstrom** *
- **Boom!** *
- **Bullseye** *
- **Empire** *
- **Golan the Insatiable** *
- **Gotham**
- **Gracepoint**
- **Home Free** *
- **Knock Knock Live** *
- **The Last Man on Earth** *
- **Mulaney**
- **Red Band Society**
- **Utopia**
- **Wayward Pines** *
- **Weird Loners** *
- **World's Funniest** *

Not returning from 2013–14:

- 24: Live Another Day
- Almost Human
- American Dad! (moved to TBS; returning to Fox in 2025–26)
- Dads
- Enlisted
- Gang Related
- I Wanna Marry "Harry"
- Kitchen Nightmares (returned for 2023–24)
- Raising Hope
- Rake
- Riot
- Surviving Jack
- The X Factor

=== NBC ===
Returning series:

- About a Boy
- American Ninja Warrior
- America's Got Talent
- The Apprentice
- The Biggest Loser
- The Blacklist
- Chicago Fire
- Chicago P.D.
- Dateline NBC
- Food Fighters
- Football Night in America
- Grimm
- Hannibal
- Hollywood Game Night
- Law & Order: Special Victims Unit
- Last Comic Standing
- NBC Sunday Night Football
- The Night Shift
- Parenthood
- Parks and Recreation
- Running Wild with Bear Grylls
- The Sing-Off
- Undateable
- The Voice
- Welcome to Sweden

New series:

- **A.D. The Bible Continues** *
- **A to Z**
- **Allegiance** *
- **American Odyssey** *
- **Aquarius** *
- **Bad Judge**
- **The Carmichael Show** *
- **Caught on Camera with Nick Cannon**
- **Constantine**
- **Dateline: The Real Blacklist** *
- **I Can Do That** *
- **The Island** *
- **Marry Me**
- **Mr. Robinson** *
- **The Mysteries of Laura**
- **One Big Happy** *
- **The Slap** *
- **State of Affairs**

Not returning from 2013–14:

- Believe
- Community (moved to Yahoo! Screen)
- Crisis
- Crossbones
- Dracula
- Growing Up Fisher
- Ironside
- The Michael J. Fox Show
- Revolution
- Sean Saves the World
- Taxi Brooklyn
- Welcome to the Family
- Working the Engels

== Renewals and cancellations ==
=== Full season pickups ===
==== ABC ====
- Black-ish—Picked up for a full 22-episode season on October 9, 2014, then an additional two episodes for a twenty-four-episode season on October 23, 2014.
- Cristela—Picked up for a full 22-episode season on November 24, 2014.
- Forever—Picked up for a full 22-episode season on November 7, 2014.
- How to Get Away with Murder—Picked up for a 15-episode season on October 9, 2014.

==== CBS ====
- Madam Secretary—Picked up for a full 22-episode season on October 27, 2014.
- The McCarthys—Picked up for two additional episodes for a total of 15 episodes on December 1, 2014.
- NCIS: New Orleans—Picked up for a full 23-episode season on October 27, 2014.
- Scorpion—Picked up for a full 22-episode season on October 27, 2014.
- Stalker—Picked up for a full 20-episode season on October 27, 2014.

==== The CW ====
- The Flash—Picked up for a full 23-episode season on October 21, 2014.
- Jane the Virgin—Picked up for a full 22-episode season on October 21, 2014.

==== Fox ====
- Gotham—Picked up for a full 22-episode season on October 13, 2014.
- Mulaney—Picked up for an additional 10 episodes on May 6, 2014, for a total of a 16-episode season. This order was later cut back by three episodes on October 18, 2014, when production was effectively shut down.

==== NBC ====
- Marry Me—Picked up for five additional episodes for a total of 18 episodes on November 5, 2014.
- The Mysteries of Laura—Picked up for a full 22-episode season on October 28, 2014.

=== Renewals ===
==== ABC ====
- 20/20—Renewed for a thirty-seventh season on May 7, 2015.
- 500 Questions—Renewed for a second season on October 1, 2015.
- Agent Carter—Renewed for a second season on May 7, 2015.
- Agents of S.H.I.E.L.D.—Renewed for a third season on May 7, 2015.
- America's Funniest Home Videos—Renewed for a twenty-sixth season on May 7, 2015.
- American Crime—Renewed for a second season on May 7, 2015.
- The Bachelor—Renewed for a twentieth season on May 7, 2015.
- BattleBots—Renewed for a second season on November 6, 2015.
- Beyond the Tank—Renewed for a second season on May 7, 2015.
- Black-ish—Renewed for a second season on May 7, 2015.
- Castle—Renewed for an eighth season on May 7, 2015.
- Celebrity Family Feud—Renewed for a second season on January 9, 2016.
- Dancing with the Stars—Renewed for a twenty-first season on May 7, 2015.
- Fresh Off the Boat—Renewed for a second season on May 7, 2015.
- Galavant—Renewed for a second season on May 7, 2015.
- The Goldbergs—Renewed for a third season on May 7, 2015.
- Grey's Anatomy—Renewed for a twelfth season on May 7, 2015.
- How to Get Away with Murder—Renewed for a second season on May 7, 2015.
- Last Man Standing—Renewed for a fifth season on May 10, 2015.
- The Middle—Renewed for a seventh season on May 7, 2015.
- Mistresses—Renewed for a fourth season on September 25, 2015.
- Modern Family—Renewed for a seventh season on May 7, 2015.
- Nashville—Renewed for a fourth season on May 7, 2015.
- Once Upon a Time—Renewed for a fifth season on May 7, 2015.
- Secrets & Lies—Renewed for a second season on May 7, 2015.
- Scandal—Renewed for a fifth season on May 7, 2015.
- Shark Tank—Renewed for a seventh season on May 7, 2015.

==== CBS ====
- 2 Broke Girls—Renewed for a fifth season on March 12, 2015.
- 48 Hours—Renewed for a twenty-eighth season on May 11, 2015.
- 60 Minutes—Renewed for a forty-eighth season on May 11, 2015.
- The Amazing Race—Renewed for a twenty-seventh season on May 11, 2015.
- The Big Bang Theory—Renewed for a ninth and tenth season on March 12, 2014.
- Big Brother—Renewed for a seventeenth and eighteenth season on September 24, 2014.
- Blue Bloods—Renewed for a sixth season on May 11, 2015.
- Criminal Minds—Renewed for an eleventh season on May 11, 2015.
- CSI: Cyber—Renewed for a second season on May 11, 2015.
- Elementary—Renewed for a fourth season on May 11, 2015.
- The Good Wife—Renewed for a seventh and final season on May 11, 2015.
- Hawaii Five-0—Renewed for a sixth season on May 11, 2015.
- Madam Secretary—Renewed for a second season on January 12, 2015.
- Mike & Molly—Renewed for a sixth and final season on March 12, 2015.
- Mom—Renewed for a third season on March 12, 2015.
- NCIS—Renewed for a thirteenth season on May 11, 2015.
- NCIS: Los Angeles—Renewed for a seventh season on May 11, 2015.
- NCIS: New Orleans—Renewed for a second season on January 12, 2015.
- The Odd Couple—Renewed for a second season on May 11, 2015.
- Person of Interest—Renewed for a fifth and final season on May 11, 2015.
- Scorpion—Renewed for a second season on January 12, 2015.
- Survivor—Renewed for a thirty-first season on May 11, 2015.
- Thursday Night Football—Renewed for a second season on January 18, 2015.
- Undercover Boss—Renewed for a seventh season on May 11, 2015.
- Zoo—Renewed for a second season on October 2, 2015.

==== The CW ====
- The 100—Renewed for a third season on January 11, 2015.
- America's Next Top Model—Renewed for a twenty-second cycle on November 17, 2014.
- Arrow—Renewed for a fourth season on January 11, 2015.
- Beauty & the Beast—Renewed for a fourth season on February 13, 2015.
- The Flash—Renewed for a second season on January 11, 2015.
- iZombie—Renewed for a second season on May 6, 2015.
- Jane the Virgin—Renewed for a second season on January 11, 2015.
- The Originals—Renewed for a third season on January 11, 2015.
- Penn & Teller: Fool Us—Renewed for a third season on August 11, 2015.
- Reign—Renewed for a third season on January 11, 2015.
- Supernatural—Renewed for an eleventh season on January 11, 2015.
- The Vampire Diaries—Renewed for a seventh season on January 11, 2015.
- Whose Line Is It Anyway?—Renewed for a twelfth season on August 11, 2015.

==== Fox ====
- American Idol—Renewed for a fifteenth and final season on May 11, 2015
- Bob's Burgers—Renewed for a sixth season on January 8, 2015.
- Bones—Renewed for an eleventh season on May 8, 2015.
- Brooklyn Nine-Nine—Renewed for a third season on January 17, 2015.
- Empire—Renewed for a second season on January 17, 2015.
- Family Guy—Renewed for a fourteenth season on May 11, 2015.
- Gotham—Renewed for a second season on January 17, 2015.
- The Last Man on Earth—Renewed for a second season on April 8, 2015.
- MasterChef—Renewed for a seventh season on July 22, 2015.
- MasterChef Junior—Renewed for a fourth season on January 13, 2015.
- New Girl—Renewed for a fifth season on March 31, 2015.
- The Simpsons—Renewed for a twenty-seventh and twenty-eighth season on May 4, 2015.
- Sleepy Hollow—Renewed for a third season on March 18, 2015.
- Wayward Pines—Renewed for a second season on December 9, 2015.
- World's Funniest Fails—Renewed for a second season on May 11, 2015.

==== NBC ====
- American Ninja Warrior—Renewed for an eighth season on August 13, 2015.
- America's Got Talent—Renewed for an eleventh season on September 2, 2015.
- The Apprentice—Renewed for a fifteenth season on February 16, 2015.
- Aquarius—Renewed for a second season on June 26, 2015.
- The Biggest Loser—Renewed for a seventeenth season on May 10, 2015.
- The Blacklist—Renewed for a third season on February 5, 2015.
- The Carmichael Show—Renewed for a second season on September 14, 2015.
- Chicago Fire—Renewed for a fourth season on February 5, 2015.
- Chicago P.D.—Renewed for a third season on February 5, 2015.
- Football Night in America—Renewed for a tenth season on December 14, 2011.
- Grimm—Renewed for a fifth season on February 5, 2015.
- Hollywood Game Night—Renewed for a fourth season on December 2, 2015.
- I Can Do That—Renewed for a second season on July 2, 2015.
- Law & Order: Special Victims Unit—Renewed for a seventeenth season on February 5, 2015.
- The Mysteries of Laura—Renewed for a second season on May 8, 2015.
- NBC Sunday Night Football—Renewed for a tenth season on December 14, 2011.
- The Night Shift—Renewed for a third season on May 8, 2015.
- Undateable—Renewed for a third season on May 8, 2015.
- The Voice—Renewed for a ninth season on May 10, 2015.

=== Cancellations/series endings ===
==== ABC ====
- The Astronaut Wives Club—Canceled on August 23, 2015.
- Cristela—Canceled on May 7, 2015.
- Forever—Canceled on May 7, 2015.
- Manhattan Love Story—Canceled on October 24, 2014 after four low rated episodes. This was the first cancellation of the season.
- Members Only—It was announced on November 23, 2014 that production would not go forward, despite being picked up straight to series in January.
- Repeat After Me—Was never renewed for a second season.
- Resurrection—Canceled on May 7, 2015.
- Revenge—Canceled on April 29, 2015 after four seasons. The series concluded on May 10, 2015.
- Rookie Blue—Canceled on October 16, 2015 after six seasons.
- Selfie—Canceled on November 7, 2014 following completion of its initial thirteen episode order due to low ratings.
- The Taste—Canceled on May 7, 2015.
- The Whispers—Canceled on October 22, 2015.

==== CBS ====
- Battle Creek—Canceled on May 8, 2015.
- The Briefcase—Canceled on December 9, 2015.
- Extant—Canceled on October 9, 2015.
- The McCarthys—On February 3, 2015, the series was pulled from the schedule. It was later canceled on May 8, 2015. The remaining episodes aired beginning July 4, 2015.
- The Mentalist—It was announced on September 27, 2014 that season seven would be the final season. The series concluded on February 18, 2015.
- The Millers—Canceled on November 14, 2014. The remaining episodes aired beginning July 4, 2015.
- Stalker—Canceled on May 8, 2015.
- Two and a Half Men—It was announced on May 14, 2014 that season twelve would be the final season. The series concluded on February 19, 2015.
- Under the Dome—Canceled on August 31, 2015 after three seasons. The series concluded on September 10, 2015.

==== The CW ====
- Hart of Dixie—It was announced on March 14, 2015 that the show will end after four seasons. The series concluded on March 27, 2015, but wasn't officially canceled until May 7, 2015.
- The Messengers—Canceled on May 7, 2015.

==== Fox ====
- Backstrom—Canceled on May 8, 2015.
- The Following—Canceled on May 8, 2015.
- Glee—It was announced on October 17, 2013 that season six would be the final season. The series concluded on March 20, 2015.
- Hieroglyph—It was announced on June 30, 2014 that production would not continue after filming one episode.
- Knock Knock Live—Canceled on July 30, 2015 after two low rated episodes.
- The Mindy Project—Canceled on May 6, 2015, after three seasons. On May 15, 2015, It was announced that Hulu would pick up the series for another season.
- Mulaney—It was announced on October 18, 2014 that Fox cut the episode order by 3 episodes, effectively shutting down production. It was later canceled on February 28, 2015.
- Red Band Society—On November 26, 2014, it was confirmed that the show would stop production after the 13-episode order, and the show was pulled from the schedule. It was later canceled on January 13, 2015.
- Utopia—Canceled on November 2, 2014 after 12 low rated episodes. Production would not continue past that point and 24/7 live streaming was discontinued.
- Weird Loners—Canceled on May 11, 2015

==== NBC ====
- A to Z—Canceled on October 31, 2014 following completion of its initial thirteen episode order due to low ratings.
- A.D. The Bible Continues—Canceled on July 3, 2015.
- About a Boy—Canceled on May 8, 2015.
- Allegiance—Canceled on March 6, 2015 after five low rated episodes.
- American Odyssey—Canceled on June 30, 2015.
- Bad Judge—Canceled on October 31, 2014 following completion of its initial thirteen episode order due to low ratings.
- Constantine—Canceled on May 8, 2015.
- Emerald City—It was announced on August 22, 2014 that production would not go forward, despite being previously ordered to a ten episode limited series, bypassing the pilot process. The decision on the series' cancellation was later reversed on April 15, 2015, to air in the following season.
- Hannibal—Canceled on June 22, 2015 after three seasons. The series concluded on August 29, 2015.
- Marry Me—Canceled on May 8, 2015.
- Mission Control—It was announced on October 15, 2014, that the series order for six episodes was rescinded – prior to production starting on episodes beyond the pilot.
- Mr. Robinson—Canceled on September 14, 2015.
- One Big Happy—Canceled on May 8, 2015.
- Parenthood—It was announced on May 11, 2014 that season six would be the final season. The series concluded on January 29, 2015.
- Parks and Recreation—It was announced on May 11, 2014 that season seven would be the final season. The series concluded on February 24, 2015.
- State of Affairs—Canceled on May 8, 2015.
- Unbreakable Kimmy Schmidt—It was announced on November 21, 2014, that the series would air on Netflix with a two-season order, where all thirteen episodes of the first season premiered on March 6, 2015.
- Welcome to Sweden—Canceled on July 28, 2015 after two seasons.

== See also ==
- 2014–15 United States network television schedule (daytime)
- 2014–15 United States network television schedule (late night)
