= 2013–14 United States network television schedule =

Television schedule for the fall of 2013

The 2013–14 network television schedule for the five major English-language commercial broadcast networks in the United States covers primetime hours from September 2013 to August 2014. The schedule is followed by a list per network of returning series, new series, and series canceled after the 2012–13 season.

NBC was the first to announce its fall schedule on May 12, 2013, followed by Fox on May 13, ABC on May 14, CBS on May 15, and The CW on May 16, 2013.

PBS is not included; member stations have local flexibility over most of their schedules and broadcast times for network shows may vary. The CW is not included on weekends, when it does not offer network programming. Ion Television, The CW Plus, and MyNetworkTV are also not included since the majority of the networks' schedules comprise syndicated reruns (with limited original programming on the latter two).

New series are highlighted in bold.

All times are U.S. Eastern and Pacific time (except for some live events or specials). Subtract one hour for Central, Mountain, Alaska and Hawaii–Aleutian times.

Note: From February 6 to February 23, 2014, all NBC primetime programming was pre-empted for coverage of the 2014 Sochi Winter Olympics.

Each of the 30 highest-rated shows is listed with its rank and rating as determined by Nielsen Media Research.

== Legend ==
- Light blue indicates local programming.
- Gray indicates encore programming.
- Blue-gray indicates news programming.
- Light green indicates sporting events.
- Light purple indicates movies.
- Red indicates series being burned off and other irregularly scheduled programs, including specials.
- Yellow indicates the top-10 most watched programs of the season
- Cyan indicates the top-20 most watched programs of the season
- Magenta indicates the top-30 most watched programs of the season

== Sunday ==
Network		7:00 p.m.	7:30 p.m.	8:00 p.m.	8:30 p.m.	9:00 p.m.	9:30 p.m.	10:00 p.m.	10:30 p.m.
ABC	Fall	America's Funniest Home Videos		Once Upon a Time		Revenge		**Betrayal**	
ABC	Winter	America's Funniest Home Videos		The Bachelor		Revenge		**Betrayal**	
ABC	Late winter	America's Funniest Home Videos		Once Upon a Time		**Resurrection** (15/8.1)		Revenge	
ABC	Spring	America's Funniest Home Videos		Once Upon a Time		**Resurrection** (15/8.1)		Revenge	
ABC	Summer	America's Funniest Home Videos		Wipeout		**Rising Star**			
ABC	Mid-summer	America's Funniest Home Videos		Wipeout		**Rising Star**		Castle (12/8.3)	
CBS	Fall	NFL on CBS (4:25 p.m.)	60 Minutes (17/7.7)		The Amazing Race		The Good Wife (18/7.6) (Tied with Elementary and Modern Family)		The Mentalist (continued until 11:30 p.m.) (23/7.3)
CBS	Winter	60 Minutes (17/7.7)		Encore programming		The Good Wife (18/7.6) (Tied with Elementary and Modern Family)		The Mentalist (23/7.3)	
CBS	Late winter	60 Minutes (17/7.7)		The Amazing Race: All-Stars		The Good Wife (18/7.6) (Tied with Elementary and Modern Family)		The Mentalist (23/7.3)	
CBS	Spring	60 Minutes (17/7.7)		The Amazing Race: All-Stars		The Good Wife (18/7.6) (Tied with Elementary and Modern Family)		The Mentalist (23/7.3)	
CBS	Summer	60 Minutes (17/7.7)		Big Brother		Unforgettable		**Reckless**	
Fox	Fall	Fox NFL (4:25 p.m.)	The OT	The Simpsons	Bob's Burgers	Family Guy	American Dad!	Local programming	
Fox	Winter	Bob's Burgers	American Dad!	The Simpsons	Bob's Burgers	Family Guy	American Dad!	Local programming	
Fox	Spring	Bob's Burgers	American Dad!	The Simpsons	Family Guy	**Cosmos: A Spacetime Odyssey**		Local programming	
Fox	Summer	**Enlisted**	American Dad!	The Simpsons	Family Guy	**Cosmos: A Spacetime Odyssey**		Local programming	
Fox	Mid-summer	American Dad! (R)	Bob's Burgers (R)	The Simpsons	The Simpsons (R)	Family Guy (R)	American Dad! (R)	Local programming	
NBC	Fall	Football Night in America		NBC Sunday Night Football (8:20 p.m.) (continued to game completion) (1/12.6) (Tied with NCIS)					
NBC	Winter	Football Night in America		NBC Sunday Night Football (8:20 p.m.) (continued to game completion) (1/12.6) (Tied with NCIS)					
NBC	Spring	Dateline NBC		**American Dream Builders**		**Believe**		**Crisis**	
NBC	Mid-spring	**American Dream Builders**		Dateline NBC		**Believe**		**Crisis**	

== Monday ==
Network		8:00 p.m.	8:30 p.m.	9:00 p.m.	9:30 p.m.	10:00 p.m.	10:30 p.m.
ABC	Fall	Dancing with the Stars (5/10.0)				Castle (12/8.3)	
ABC	Late fall	**The Great Christmas Light Fight**				Castle (12/8.3)	
ABC	Winter	The Bachelor				Castle (12/8.3)	
ABC	Spring	Dancing with the Stars (5/10.0)				Castle (12/8.3)	
ABC	Summer	The Bachelorette				Mistresses	
ABC	Late summer	**Bachelor in Paradise**				Mistresses	
CBS	Fall	How I Met Your Mother (28/6.6)	**We Are Men**	2 Broke Girls	**Mom**	**Hostages**	
CBS	Late fall	How I Met Your Mother (28/6.6)	2 Broke Girls	Mike & Molly	**Mom**	**Hostages**	
CBS	Winter	How I Met Your Mother (28/6.6)	2 Broke Girls	Mike & Molly	**Mom**	**Intelligence** (29/6.5) (Tied with Chicago Fire)	
CBS	Spring	2 Broke Girls	**Friends with Better Lives**	Mike & Molly	**Mom**	The Amazing Race	
CBS	Summer	2 Broke Girls	**The Millers**	Mike & Molly	Two and a Half Men	Under the Dome	
The CW	Fall	Hart of Dixie		Beauty & the Beast		Local programming	
The CW	Winter	**Star-Crossed**		**The Tomorrow People**		Local programming	
The CW	Spring	**Star-Crossed**		**The Tomorrow People**		Local programming	
The CW	Summer	Whose Line Is It Anyway?	Whose Line Is It Anyway?	Beauty & the Beast		Local programming	
The CW	Mid-summer	Whose Line Is It Anyway?	**Backpackers**	Whose Line Is It Anyway?	**Seed**	Local programming	
The CW	Late summer	Whose Line Is It Anyway?	**Seed**	America's Next Top Model		Local programming	
Fox	Fall	Bones		**Sleepy Hollow**		Local programming	
Fox	Mid-fall	**Almost Human**		**Sleepy Hollow**		Local programming	
Fox	Winter	**Almost Human**		The Following		Local programming	
Fox	Spring	Bones		The Following		Local programming	
Fox	Summer	MasterChef		**24: Live Another Day**		Local programming	
Fox	Mid-summer	MasterChef		Hotel Hell		Local programming	
NBC	Fall	The Voice (8/8.9)				**The Blacklist** (6/9.5)	
NBC	Late fall	Hollywood Game Night				**The Blacklist** (6/9.5)	
NBC	Winter	The Voice (8/8.9)				**The Blacklist** (6/9.5)	
NBC	Spring	The Voice (8/8.9)				**The Blacklist** (6/9.5)	
NBC	Summer	**The Blacklist** (6/9.5)		American Ninja Warrior			
NBC	Mid-summer	**Running Wild with Bear Grylls**		American Ninja Warrior			

== Tuesday ==
Network		8:00 p.m.	8:30 p.m.	9:00 p.m.	9:30 p.m.	10:00 p.m.	10:30 p.m.
ABC	Fall	**Agents of S.H.I.E.L.D.**		**The Goldbergs**	**Trophy Wife**	**Lucky 7**	
ABC	Mid-fall	**Agents of S.H.I.E.L.D.**		**The Goldbergs**	**Trophy Wife**	Castle (R)	
ABC	Winter	**Agents of S.H.I.E.L.D.**		**The Goldbergs**	**Trophy Wife**	Primetime: What Would You Do?	
ABC	Mid-winter	**Agents of S.H.I.E.L.D.**		**The Goldbergs**	**Trophy Wife**	**Killer Women**	
ABC	Spring	**Agents of S.H.I.E.L.D.**		**The Goldbergs**	**Trophy Wife**	**Mind Games**	
ABC	Mid-spring	**Agents of S.H.I.E.L.D.**		**The Goldbergs**	**Trophy Wife**	Celebrity Wife Swap	
ABC	Summer	Extreme Weight Loss				Celebrity Wife Swap	
CBS		NCIS (1/12.6) (Tied with NBC Sunday Night Football)		NCIS: Los Angeles (4/10.3)		Person of Interest (7/9.0)	
The CW	Fall	**The Originals**		Supernatural		Local programming	
The CW	Winter	**The Originals**		Supernatural		Local programming	
The CW	Spring	**The Originals**		Supernatural		Local programming	
The CW	Summer	**Famous in 12**		Hart of Dixie		Local programming	
The CW	Mid-summer	**Famous in 12**				Local programming	
Fox	Fall	**Dads**	**Brooklyn Nine-Nine**	New Girl	The Mindy Project	Local programming	
Fox	Winter	Glee		New Girl	**Brooklyn Nine-Nine**	Local programming	
Fox	Spring	Glee		New Girl	The Mindy Project	Local programming	
Fox	Summer	**Riot**		**I Wanna Marry "Harry"**		Local programming	
Fox	Mid-summer	Family Guy (R)	**Brooklyn Nine-Nine** (R)		The Mindy Project (R)	Local programming	
Fox	Late summer	Family Guy (R)	**Brooklyn Nine-Nine** (R)	New Girl (R)	The Mindy Project (R)	Local programming	
NBC	Fall	The Biggest Loser		The Voice (10/8.6)		Chicago Fire (29/6.5) (Tied with Intelligence)	
NBC	Winter	The Biggest Loser				Chicago Fire (29/6.5) (Tied with Intelligence)	
NBC	Spring	The Voice (10/8.6)		**About a Boy**	**Growing Up Fisher**	Chicago Fire (29/6.5) (Tied with Intelligence)	
NBC	Summer	America's Got Talent				**The Night Shift**	
NBC	Mid-summer	**Food Fighters**		America's Got Talent			

== Wednesday ==
Network		8:00 p.m.	8:30 p.m.	9:00 p.m.	9:30 p.m.	10:00 p.m.	10:30 p.m.
ABC	Fall	The Middle	**Back in the Game**	Modern Family (18/7.6) (Tied with Elementary and The Good Wife)	**Super Fun Night**	Nashville	
ABC	Winter	The Middle	Suburgatory	Modern Family (18/7.6) (Tied with Elementary and The Good Wife)	**Super Fun Night**	Nashville	
ABC	Late winter	The Middle	Suburgatory	Modern Family (18/7.6) (Tied with Elementary and The Good Wife)	**Mixology**	Nashville	
ABC	Spring	The Middle	Suburgatory	Modern Family (18/7.6) (Tied with Elementary and The Good Wife)	**Mixology**	Nashville	
ABC	Summer	The Middle	**The Goldbergs** (R)	Modern Family (18/7.6) (Tied with Elementary and The Good Wife)	**The Goldbergs** (R)	Motive	
CBS	Fall	Survivor: Blood vs. Water (25/7.0) (Tied with American Idol)		Criminal Minds (13/8.2) (Tied with Scandal)		CSI: Crime Scene Investigation (16/7.8)	
CBS	Late fall	Encore programming		Criminal Minds (13/8.2) (Tied with Scandal)		CSI: Crime Scene Investigation (16/7.8)	
CBS	Winter	Survivor: Cagayan – Brains vs. Brawn vs. Beauty (25/7.0) (Tied with American Idol)		Criminal Minds (13/8.2) (Tied with Scandal)		CSI: Crime Scene Investigation (16/7.8)	
CBS	Spring	Survivor: Cagayan – Brains vs. Brawn vs. Beauty (25/7.0) (Tied with American Idol)		Criminal Minds (13/8.2) (Tied with Scandal)		CSI: Crime Scene Investigation (16/7.8)	
CBS	Summer	Big Brother		**Extant**		Criminal Minds (R)	
CBS	Mid-summer	Big Brother		Criminal Minds (R)		**Extant**	
The CW	Fall	Arrow		**The Tomorrow People**		Local programming	
The CW	Winter	Arrow		**The Tomorrow People**		Local programming	
The CW	Spring	Arrow		**The 100**		Local programming	
The CW	Summer	**Penn & Teller: Fool Us**		**The 100**		Local programming	
Fox	Fall	The X Factor				Local programming	
Fox	Winter	American Idol (22/7.4)				Local programming	
Fox	Spring	American Idol (22/7.4)				Local programming	
Fox	Summer	So You Think You Can Dance				Local programming	
NBC	Fall	Revolution		Law & Order: Special Victims Unit		**Ironside**	
NBC	Mid-fall	Revolution		Law & Order: Special Victims Unit		Dateline NBC	
NBC	Winter	Revolution		Law & Order: Special Victims Unit		**Chicago P.D.**	
NBC	Spring	Revolution		Law & Order: Special Victims Unit		**Chicago P.D.**	
NBC	Summer	Various programming					
NBC	Mid-summer	America's Got Talent				**Taxi Brooklyn**	

== Thursday ==
Network		8:00 p.m.	8:30 p.m.	9:00 p.m.	9:30 p.m.	10:00 p.m.	10:30 p.m.
ABC	Fall	**Once Upon a Time in Wonderland**		Grey's Anatomy (11/8.5)		Scandal (13/8.2) (Tied with Criminal Minds)	
ABC	Winter	The Taste				**The Assets**	
ABC	Mid-winter	The Taste				Grey's Anatomy (11/8.5)	
ABC	Spring	**Once Upon a Time in Wonderland**		Grey's Anatomy (11/8.5)		Scandal (13/8.2) (Tied with Criminal Minds)	
ABC	Mid-spring	Grey's Anatomy (R)		**Black Box**		Scandal (13/8.2) (Tied with Criminal Minds)	
ABC	Summer	**Black Box**		Rookie Blue		NY Med	
ABC	Mid-summer	**The Quest**		Rookie Blue		NY Med	
CBS	Fall	The Big Bang Theory (3/12.3)	**The Millers** (24/7.1)	**The Crazy Ones**	Two and a Half Men (27/6.8)	Elementary (18/7.6) (Tied with The Good Wife and Modern Family)	
CBS	Winter	The Big Bang Theory (3/12.3)	**The Millers** (24/7.1)	**The Crazy Ones**	Two and a Half Men (27/6.8)	Elementary (18/7.6) (Tied with The Good Wife and Modern Family)	
CBS	Spring	The Big Bang Theory (3/12.3)	**The Millers** (24/7.1)	Two and a Half Men (27/6.8)	**The Crazy Ones**	Elementary (18/7.6) (Tied with The Good Wife and Modern Family)	
CBS	Mid-spring	The Big Bang Theory (3/12.3)	**The Millers** (24/7.1)	Two and a Half Men (27/6.8)	**Bad Teacher**	Elementary (18/7.6) (Tied with The Good Wife and Modern Family)	
CBS	Summer	The Big Bang Theory (3/12.3)	**The Millers** (24/7.1)	Big Brother		Elementary (18/7.6) (Tied with The Good Wife and Modern Family)	
The CW		The Vampire Diaries		**Reign**		Local programming	
Fox	Fall	The X Factor		Glee		Local programming	
Fox	Winter	American Idol (25/7.0) (Tied with Survivor)		**Rake**		Local programming	
Fox	Spring	Hell's Kitchen		American Idol (25/7.0) (Tied with Survivor)	**Surviving Jack**	Local programming	
Fox	Summer	Hell's Kitchen		**Gang Related**		Local programming	
NBC	Fall	Parks and Recreation	**Welcome to the Family**	**Sean Saves the World**	**The Michael J. Fox Show**	Parenthood	
NBC	Mid-fall	Parks and Recreation		**Sean Saves the World**	**The Michael J. Fox Show**	Parenthood	
NBC	Winter	Community	Parks and Recreation	**Sean Saves the World**	**The Michael J. Fox Show**	Parenthood	
NBC	Spring	Community	Parks and Recreation	Hollywood Game Night		Parenthood	
NBC	Summer	Hollywood Game Night		**Undateable**		Last Comic Standing	
NBC	Mid-summer	Hollywood Game Night		**Welcome to Sweden**	**Working the Engels**	Last Comic Standing	
NBC	Late summer	Hollywood Game Night		**Welcome to Sweden**		America's Got Talent (R)	

== Friday ==
Network		8:00 p.m.	8:30 p.m.	9:00 p.m.	9:30 p.m.	10:00 p.m.	10:30 p.m.
ABC	Fall	Last Man Standing	The Neighbors	Shark Tank		20/20	
ABC	Winter	Last Man Standing	The Neighbors	Shark Tank		20/20	
ABC	Spring	Last Man Standing	The Neighbors	Shark Tank		20/20	
ABC	Summer	Shark Tank		Primetime: What Would You Do?		20/20	
CBS	Fall	Undercover Boss		Hawaii Five-0 (21/7.5)		Blue Bloods (9/8.8)	
CBS	Winter	Undercover Boss		Hawaii Five-0 (21/7.5)		Blue Bloods (9/8.8)	
CBS	Spring	Unforgettable		Hawaii Five-0 (21/7.5)		Blue Bloods (9/8.8)	
CBS	Summer	Undercover Boss		Hawaii Five-0 (21/7.5)		Blue Bloods (9/8.8)	
The CW	Fall	The Carrie Diaries		America's Next Top Model		Local programming	
The CW	Late fall	The Carrie Diaries		Nikita		Local programming	
The CW	Winter	The Carrie Diaries		The Vampire Diaries		Local programming	
The CW	Mid-winter	Whose Line Is It Anyway?				Local programming	
The CW	Spring	Whose Line Is It Anyway?		Hart of Dixie		Local programming	
The CW	Summer	**Masters of Illusion**	Whose Line Is It Anyway?			Local programming	
Fox	Fall	**MasterChef Junior**		**Sleepy Hollow** (R)		Local programming	
Fox	Late fall	Bones		Raising Hope		Local programming	
Fox	Winter	Bones		Raising Hope	**Enlisted**	Local programming	
Fox	Late winter	Bones		**Enlisted**	Raising Hope	Local programming	
Fox	Spring	**Rake**		**Enlisted**	Raising Hope	Local programming	
Fox	Mid-spring	Kitchen Nightmares				Local programming	
Fox	Summer	Kitchen Nightmares				Local programming	
NBC	Fall	Dateline NBC		Grimm		**Dracula**	
NBC	Winter	Dateline NBC		Grimm		Hannibal	
NBC	Spring	Dateline NBC		Grimm		Hannibal	
NBC	Summer	Dateline NBC				**Crossbones**	

Note: Us & Them was originally set to air in the spring until Fox decided not to broadcast it. It would instead premiere on Sony Crackle on October 1, 2018.

== Saturday ==
Network		8:00 p.m.	8:30 p.m.	9:00 p.m.	9:30 p.m.	10:00 p.m.	10:30 p.m.
ABC	Fall	ESPN Saturday Night Football (continued to game competition)					
ABC	Winter	ABC Saturday Movie of the Week					
ABC	Spring	Various programming		Nightline Prime		20/20 Saturday	
ABC	Summer	Bet on Your Baby		**Sing Your Face Off**			
ABC	Mid-summer	Bet on Your Baby		**The Assets**		Nightline Prime	
ABC	Late summer	Bet on Your Baby		Rookie Blue		Nightline Prime	
CBS	Fall	Comedytime Saturday		Crimetime Saturday		48 Hours	
CBS	Winter	Comedytime Saturday		Crimetime Saturday		48 Hours	
CBS	Spring	Comedytime Saturday		Crimetime Saturday		48 Hours	
CBS	Summer	**Bad Teacher**		Crimetime Saturday		48 Hours	
Fox	Fall	Fox College Football (continued to game competition)					
Fox	Winter	**Rake**				Local programming	
Fox	Spring	Baseball Night in America (7:00 p.m.)				Local programming	
Fox	Summer	Baseball Night in America (7:00 p.m.)				Local programming	
NBC	Fall	Various programming					
NBC	Winter	Various programming					
NBC	Spring	Various programming					
NBC	Summer	**Crossbones**				Dateline NBC	

== By network ==
=== ABC ===
Returning series:

- 20/20
- ABC Saturday Movie of the Week
- America's Funniest Home Videos
- The Bachelor
- The Bachelorette
- Bet on Your Baby
- Castle
- Dancing with the Stars
- Extreme Weight Loss
- Grey's Anatomy
- Last Man Standing
- The Middle
- Mistresses
- Modern Family
- Motive
- Nashville
- The Neighbors
- NY Med
- Once Upon a Time
- Primetime: What Would You Do?
- Revenge
- Rookie Blue
- Saturday Night Football
- Scandal
- Shark Tank
- Suburgatory
- The Taste
- Wife Swap
- Wipeout

New series:

- **Agents of S.H.I.E.L.D.**
- **The Assets** *
- **Bachelor in Paradise** *
- **Back in the Game**
- **Betrayal**
- **Black Box** *
- **The Goldbergs**
- **The Great Christmas Light Fight**
- **Killer Women** *
- **Lucky 7**
- **Mind Games** *
- **Mixology** *
- **Once Upon a Time in Wonderland**
- **The Quest** *
- **Resurrection** *
- **Rising Star** *
- **Sing Your Face Off** *
- **Super Fun Night**
- **Trophy Wife**

Not returning from 2012–13:

- 666 Park Avenue
- Body of Proof
- Don't Trust the B— in Apartment 23
- Family Tools
- Happy Endings
- How to Live with Your Parents (For the Rest of Your Life)
- Last Resort
- Malibu Country
- Private Practice
- Red Widow
- Whodunnit?
- Zero Hour

=== CBS ===
Returning series:

- 2 Broke Girls
- 48 Hours
- 60 Minutes
- The Amazing Race
- The Big Bang Theory
- Big Brother
- Blue Bloods
- Criminal Minds
- CSI: Crime Scene Investigation
- Elementary
- The Good Wife
- Hawaii Five-0
- How I Met Your Mother
- The Mentalist
- Mike & Molly
- NCIS
- NCIS: Los Angeles
- Person of Interest
- Survivor
- Two and a Half Men
- Undercover Boss
- Under the Dome
- Unforgettable

New series:

- **Bad Teacher** *
- **The Crazy Ones**
- **Extant** *
- **Friends with Better Lives** *
- **Hostages**
- **Intelligence** *
- **The Millers**
- **Mom**
- **Reckless** *
- **We Are Men**

Not returning from 2012–13:

- CSI: NY
- Golden Boy
- The Job
- Made in Jersey
- Partners
- Rules of Engagement
- Vegas

=== The CW ===
Returning series:

- America's Next Top Model
- Arrow
- Beauty & the Beast
- The Carrie Diaries
- Hart of Dixie
- Nikita
- Supernatural
- The Vampire Diaries
- Whose Line Is It Anyway?

New series:

- **The 100** *
- **Backpackers** *
- **Famous in 12** *
- **Masters of Illusion** *
- **The Originals**
- **Penn & Teller: Fool Us** *
- **Reign**
- **Seed** *
- **Star-Crossed** *
- **The Tomorrow People**

Not returning from 2012–13:

- 90210
- Breaking Pointe
- Capture
- Cult
- Emily Owens, M.D.
- Gossip Girl
- Oh Sit!
- Perfect Score

=== Fox ===
Returning series:

- American Dad!
- American Idol
- Baseball Night in America
- Bob's Burgers
- Bones
- Family Guy
- The Following
- Fox College Football
- Glee
- Hell's Kitchen
- Hotel Hell
- Kitchen Nightmares
- MasterChef
- The Mindy Project
- New Girl
- NFL on Fox
- The OT
- Raising Hope
- The Simpsons
- So You Think You Can Dance
- The X Factor

New series:

- **24: Live Another Day** *
- **Almost Human**
- **Brain Games** *
- **Brooklyn Nine-Nine**
- **Cosmos: A Spacetime Odyssey** *
- **Dads**
- **Enlisted** *
- **Gang Related** *
- **I Wanna Marry "Harry"** *
- **MasterChef Junior** *
- **Rake** *
- **Riot** *
- **Sleepy Hollow**
- **Surviving Jack** *

Not returning from 2012–13:

- Ben and Kate
- The Cleveland Show
- Cops (moved to Paramount Network)
- Fringe
- The Goodwin Games
- The Mob Doctor
- Touch

=== NBC ===
Returning series:

- American Ninja Warrior
- America's Got Talent
- The Biggest Loser
- Chicago Fire
- Community
- Dateline NBC
- Football Night in America
- Grimm
- Hannibal
- Hollywood Game Night
- Last Comic Standing
- Law & Order: Special Victims Unit
- NBC Sunday Night Football
- Parenthood
- Parks and Recreation
- Revolution
- The Sing-Off
- The Voice

New series:

- **About a Boy** *
- **American Dream Builders** *
- **Believe** *
- **The Blacklist**
- **Chicago P.D.** *
- **Crisis** *
- **Crossbones** *
- **Dracula**
- **Food Fighters** *
- **Growing Up Fisher** *
- **Ironside**
- **The Michael J. Fox Show**
- **The Million Second Quiz**
- **The Night Shift** *
- **Running Wild with Bear Grylls** *
- **Sean Saves the World**
- **Taxi Brooklyn** *
- **Undateable** *
- **Welcome to Sweden** *
- **Welcome to the Family**
- **Working the Engels** *

Not returning from 2012–13:

- 1600 Penn
- 30 Rock
- Animal Practice
- Betty White's Off Their Rockers (moved to Lifetime)
- Camp
- Deception
- Do No Harm
- Fashion Star
- Go On
- Guys with Kids
- The New Normal
- The Office
- Ready for Love
- Rock Center with Brian Williams
- Smash
- Up All Night
- Whitney

== Renewals and cancellations ==
=== Full season pickups ===
==== ABC ====
- Agents of S.H.I.E.L.D.—Picked up for a full twenty-two-episode season on October 10, 2013.
- The Goldbergs—Picked up for a full season on November 1, 2013.
- Shark Tank—Picked up two additional episodes on October 10, 2013, then an additional four episodes for a twenty-eight-episode season on December 12, 2013.
- Super Fun Night—Picked up four additional episodes for a total of seventeen on November 1, 2013.
- Trophy Wife—Picked up for a full season on November 1, 2013.

==== CBS ====
- The Crazy Ones—Picked up for a full season on October 18, 2013.
- The Millers—Picked up for a full season on October 18, 2013.
- Mom—Picked up for a full season on October 18, 2013.
- Person of Interest—Picked up one additional episode for a total of twenty-three on November 12, 2013.

==== The CW ====
- The Originals—Picked up for a full season on November 11, 2013.
- Reign—Picked up for a full season on November 11, 2013.
- The Tomorrow People—Picked up for a full season on November 11, 2013.

==== Fox ====
- Brooklyn Nine-Nine—Picked up for a full season on October 18, 2013.
- Dads—Picked up for a full season on October 25, 2013. Reduced from twenty-two to nineteen episodes on December 6.

==== NBC ====
- The Blacklist—Picked up for a full twenty-two-episode season on October 4, 2013.
- Chicago P.D.—Picked up for two additional episodes for a total of fifteen on January 31, 2014.
- Sean Saves the World—Picked up five additional episodes for a total of eighteen on November 8, 2013.

=== Renewals ===
==== ABC ====
- 20/20—Renewed for a thirty-sixth season on May 13, 2014.
- Agents of S.H.I.E.L.D.—Renewed for a second season on May 8, 2014.
- America's Funniest Home Videos—Renewed for a twenty-fifth season on May 9, 2014.
- The Bachelor—Renewed for a nineteenth season on May 9, 2014.
- Castle—Renewed for a seventh season on May 8, 2014.
- Dancing with the Stars—Renewed for a nineteenth season on May 9, 2014.
- The Goldbergs—Renewed for a second season on May 8, 2014.
- Grey's Anatomy—Renewed for an eleventh season on May 8, 2014.
- Last Man Standing—Renewed for a fourth season on May 10, 2014.
- The Middle—Renewed for a sixth season on May 8, 2014.
- Modern Family—Renewed for a sixth season on May 8, 2014.
- Nashville—Renewed for a third season on May 9, 2014.
- Once Upon a Time—Renewed for a fourth season on May 8, 2014.
- Resurrection—Renewed for a second season on May 8, 2014.
- Revenge—Renewed for a fourth season on May 8, 2014.
- Scandal—Renewed for a fourth season on May 8, 2014.
- Shark Tank—Renewed for a sixth season on May 9, 2014.
- The Taste—Renewed for a third season on May 13, 2014.

==== CBS ====
- 2 Broke Girls—Renewed for a fourth season on March 13, 2014.
- 48 Hours—Renewed for a twenty-seventh season on March 13, 2014.
- 60 Minutes—Renewed for a forty-seventh season on March 13, 2014.
- The Amazing Race—Renewed for a twenty-fifth season on March 13, 2014.
- The Big Bang Theory—Renewed for three additional seasons through the 2016–17 season on March 12, 2014.
- Blue Bloods—Renewed for a fifth season on March 13, 2014.
- Criminal Minds—Renewed for a tenth season on March 13, 2014.
- CSI: Crime Scene Investigation—Renewed for a fifteenth season on March 13, 2014.
- Elementary—Renewed for a third season on March 13, 2014.
- Extant—Renewed for a second season on October 9, 2014.
- The Good Wife—Renewed for a sixth season on March 13, 2014.
- Hawaii Five-0—Renewed for a fifth season on March 13, 2014.
- The Mentalist—Renewed for a seventh and final season on May 10, 2014.
- Mike & Molly—Renewed for a fifth season on March 13, 2014.
- The Millers—Renewed for a second season on March 13, 2014.
- Mom—Renewed for a second season on March 13, 2014.
- NCIS—Renewed for a twelfth season on March 13, 2014.
- NCIS: Los Angeles—Renewed for a sixth season on March 13, 2014.
- Person of Interest—Renewed for a fourth season on March 13, 2014.
- Survivor—Renewed for a twenty-ninth and thirtieth season on December 12, 2013.
- Two and a Half Men—Renewed for a twelfth and final season on March 13, 2014.
- Undercover Boss—Renewed for a sixth season on March 13, 2014.
- Under the Dome—Renewed for a third season on October 9, 2014.

==== The CW ====
- The 100—Renewed for a second season on May 8, 2014.
- America's Next Top Model—Renewed for a twenty-first season on October 18, 2013.
- Arrow—Renewed for a third season on February 13, 2014.
- Beauty & the Beast—Renewed for a third season on May 8, 2014.
- Hart of Dixie—Renewed for a fourth season on May 8, 2014.
- Masters of Illusion–Renewed for a third season on November 17, 2014.
- The Originals—Renewed for a second season on February 13, 2014.
- Penn & Teller: Fool Us—Renewed for a second season on November 17, 2014.
- Reign—Renewed for a second season on February 13, 2014.
- Supernatural—Renewed for a tenth season on February 13, 2014.
- The Vampire Diaries—Renewed for a sixth season on February 13, 2014.
- Whose Line Is It Anyway?—Renewed for an eleventh season on May 15, 2014.

==== Fox ====
- American Idol—Renewed for a fourteenth season on May 7, 2014.
- Bob's Burgers—Renewed for a fifth season on September 26, 2013.
- Bones—Renewed for a tenth season on January 29, 2014.
- Brooklyn Nine-Nine—Renewed for a second season on March 7, 2014.
- Family Guy—Renewed for a thirteenth season on May 9, 2014.
- The Following—Renewed for a third season on March 7, 2014.
- Glee—Renewed for a sixth and final season on April 19, 2013.
- MasterChef Junior—Renewed for a second season on December 19, 2013. Renewed again for a third season on March 5, 2014.
- The Mindy Project—Renewed for a third season on March 7, 2014.
- New Girl—Renewed for a fourth season on March 7, 2014.
- Sleepy Hollow—Renewed for a second season on October 3, 2013.
- So You Think You Can Dance—Renewed for a twelfth season on November 17, 2014.
- The Simpsons—Renewed for a twenty-sixth season on October 4, 2013.

==== NBC ====
- About a Boy—Renewed for a second season on May 9, 2014.
- American Ninja Warrior—Renewed for a fourth season on July 13, 2014.
- America's Got Talent—Renewed for a tenth season on July 13, 2014.
- The Apprentice—Renewed for a fourteenth season on March 19, 2014.
- The Biggest Loser—Renewed for a sixteenth season on March 19, 2014.
- The Blacklist—Renewed for a second season on December 3, 2013.
- Chicago Fire—Renewed for a third season on March 19, 2014.
- Chicago P.D.—Renewed for a second season on March 19, 2014.
- Food Fighters—Renewed for a second season on January 21, 2015.
- Football Night in America—Renewed for a ninth season on December 14, 2011.
- Grimm—Renewed for a fourth season on March 19, 2014.
- Hannibal—Renewed for a third season on May 9, 2014.
- Hollywood Game Night—Renewed for a third season on October 3, 2014.
- Law & Order: Special Victims Unit—Renewed for a sixteenth season on May 7, 2014.
- Last Comic Standing—Renewed for a ninth season on July 13, 2014.
- NBC Sunday Night Football—Renewed for a ninth season on December 14, 2011.
- The Night Shift—Renewed for a second season on July 1, 2014.
- Parenthood—Renewed for a sixth and final season on May 11, 2014.
- Parks and Recreation—Renewed for a seventh and final season on March 19, 2014.
- The Sing-Off—Renewed for a fifth season on October 1, 2014.
- Undateable—Renewed for a second season on July 31, 2014.
- The Voice—Renewed for a seventh season on March 19, 2014.
- Welcome to Sweden—Renewed for a second season on August 4, 2014.

=== Cancellations/Series endings ===
==== ABC ====
- The Assets—Canceled on January 10, 2014 after two low-rated episodes. The finale aired on August 3, 2014.
- Back in the Game—Canceled on November 1, 2013 with no more episodes set to air after the initial thirteen due to low ratings.
- Betrayal—Canceled on May 9, 2014.
- Black Box—Canceled on August 7, 2014.
- Killer Women—Canceled on May 9, 2014.
- Lucky 7—Canceled on October 4, 2013 after two low-rated episodes. This is the first cancellation of the season.
- Mind Games—Canceled on March 27, 2014 after five low-rated episodes.
- Mixology—Canceled on May 8, 2014.
- The Neighbors—Canceled on May 9, 2014 after two seasons.
- Once Upon a Time in Wonderland—Canceled on March 28, 2014. The series finale aired the following Thursday.
- Suburgatory—Canceled on May 9, 2014 after three seasons.
- Super Fun Night—Canceled on May 9, 2014.
- Trophy Wife—Canceled on May 8, 2014.

==== CBS ====
- Bad Teacher—Canceled on May 10, 2014.
- The Crazy Ones—Canceled on May 10, 2014.
- Friends with Better Lives—Canceled on May 10, 2014. The remaining episodes were burned off on Amazon Prime Video. The series concluded on September 30, 2014.
- Hostages—Canceled on May 10, 2014.
- How I Met Your Mother—It was announced on January 30, 2013 that season nine would be the final season. The series concluded on March 31, 2014.
- Intelligence—Canceled on May 10, 2014.
- Reckless—Canceled on October 9, 2014 after one season.
- Unforgettable—Canceled on October 10, 2014. On February 6, 2015, It was announced that A&E would pick up the series for another season.
- We Are Men—Canceled on October 9, 2013 after two low-rated episodes.

==== The CW ====
- Backpackers—Canceled on July 23, 2014 after two low rated episodes.
- The Carrie Diaries—Canceled on May 8, 2014 after two seasons.
- Famous in 12—Canceled on July 3, 2014 after five low rated episodes.
- Nikita—It was announced on May 16, 2013 that season four would be the final season. The series concluded on December 27, 2013.
- Seed—Canceled on July 23, 2014 after two low rated episodes.
- Star-Crossed—Canceled on May 8, 2014.
- The Tomorrow People—Canceled on May 8, 2014.

==== Fox ====
- 24: Live Another Day—The limited series was meant to run for one season only; it concluded on July 14, 2014
- Almost Human—Canceled on April 29, 2014.
- American Dad!—It was announced on July 16, 2013 that the show would move to TBS for season eleven. It aired on TBS for its eleventh thru twenty-first seasons from October 20, 2014 to March 24, 2025. On April 2, 2025, it was announced that the series would return to Fox for a twenty-second, twenty-third, twenty-fourth and twenty-fifth season.
- Dads—Canceled on May 7, 2014. The series concluded on July 16, 2014.
- Enlisted—Canceled on May 7, 2014. The series finale aired on June 22.
- Gang Related—Canceled on September 2, 2014 after one season.
- I Wanna Marry "Harry"—Canceled on June 12, 2014 after four low rated episodes.
- Kitchen Nightmares—It was announced on June 23, 2014 that Gordon Ramsay is ending the show with the current season. On May 15, 2023, it was announced that the series would return for an eighth season.
- Raising Hope—Canceled on March 10, 2014 after four seasons. The two remaining episodes aired back-to-back as a "farewell event" on April 4.
- Rake—Canceled on May 7, 2014. The series finale aired on June 27.
- Riot—Canceled on June 12, 2014 after four low rated episodes.
- Surviving Jack—Canceled on May 7, 2014. The final episode aired the following day.
- The X Factor—Canceled on February 7, 2014 after three seasons, due to a combination of low ratings, high cost and the departure of creator and judge Simon Cowell, who is returning to Britain.

==== NBC ====
- Believe—Canceled on May 9, 2014. The series finale aired on June 15.
- Community—Canceled on May 9, 2014, picked up by Yahoo! for its sixth season.
- Crisis—Canceled on May 9, 2014.
- Crossbones—Canceled on July 24, 2014. The two remaining episodes were burned off on August 2.
- Dracula—Canceled on May 10, 2014.
- Growing Up Fisher—Canceled on May 9, 2014.
- Ironside—Canceled on October 18, 2013 after three low rated episodes. Pulled off the schedule after episode 4.
- The Michael J. Fox Show—Canceled on May 10, 2014.
- Revolution—Canceled on May 9, 2014.
- Sean Saves the World—Canceled on January 28, 2014.
- Taxi Brooklyn—Canceled on March 6, 2015.
- Welcome to the Family—Canceled on October 18, 2013 after three low rated episodes.
- Working the Engels—Canceled on August 20, 2014 after five low rated episodes.

== See also ==
- 2013–14 United States network television schedule (daytime)
- 2013–14 United States network television schedule (late night)
