= Donna Moss (designer) =

Donna Moss is an interior decorator and designer in Dallas, Texas. A former contestant on HGTV's Design Star, Moss currently hosts HGTV's Donna Decorates Dallas. She has been featured in People, InStyle, Fort Worth Dream Homes and Indulge, and has been listed in the Great Women of Texas (2012).

== Early life ==
Moss credits her father as an early influence in her career. He restored vintage automobiles and race cars as a hobby. As a young girl, Moss watched him recreate the interiors and exteriors of these cars. This led her to her own desire to recreate and design in the home.

== Career ==
Moss' husband Paul began building small homes in the Dallas/Ft Worth area in the early 1980s. Moss began helping her husband's clients with their interior design selections for the homes he would build. As his business grew to larger custom homes, Moss' design business also grew. Although she had taken a job as a travel industry professional with American Airlines, she continued to work toward an interior design career. Moss had ten years of personal design experience by the time she was chosen to become a contestant in Season 1 of HGTV's Design Star, now named HGTV Star. She was voted out just behind the top five finalists. Afterward, she opened her own boutique in Texas, "That's Haute" and "That's Haute Kids" together with her daughters. In 2011, HGTV pitched her own show, and HGTV's Donna Decorates Dallas aired. It was cancelled in 2014.

== Style ==
Moss is known for big and glamorous designs favoring bold, dark colors and Gothic, romantic style. Her design scheme focuses on adding things to home space to give it warmth and depth. She focuses on DIY and home projects that help mothers and interior designers to reach their design goals under a budget.

== Appearances ==
In addition to Design Star and Donna Decorates Dallas, Moss appeared on Dallas Fort Worth Close Up, hosted as a guest judge for HGTV's White Room Challenge and presented the 23rd Annual ARTS Award with fellow celebrity designer Dann Foley from American Dream Builders.
