= Vicki Roberts =

American attorney, legal commentator, and poet

- Born: July 3, 1959 (age 67)
- Education: Mount Holyoke College, South Hadley, Massachusetts; California State University, Northridge(BA:Television, Film, Radio, 1980); Southwestern Law School (JD, 1983)
- Occupations: attorney, legal commentator, television personality
- Spouse: Arthur Andelson (m.2011)

Vicki Roberts (born July 3, 1959) is an American attorney, legal commentator, television personality, film producer, and poet. She is known for her work as an entertainment and litigation attorney, her appearances as a legal analyst on television, and her authorship of the poetry collection Bourgeois Poetry..

== Early life and education ==
Roberts was born in Long Island, New York. She graduated as valedictorian of her high school class before earning a degree in Radio, Television, and Film from California State University, Northridge. She later obtained a Juris Doctor from Southwestern University School of Law, where she graduated with honors and was placed on the dean's list.

== Career ==
=== Legal career ===
She was admitted to the California State Bar in 1983, and to the New Jersey State Bar in 1986.

Roberts is a civil and criminal litigator and appellate practitioner with decades of experience. She served as a Judge Pro Tem for the Los Angeles Municipal Court from 1984 to 1990, presiding over trials and related proceedings.

In addition to litigation, she has worked as an entertainment attorney and was formerly a licensed talent agent. She co-founded the Kismet Talent Agency and has been involved in client representation within the entertainment industry.

Her legal work has extended into media, where she has appeared as an on-air legal commentator discussing high-profile cases and legal issues.

She has presented numerous high profile clients including David Carradine, Michael Madsen, Gary Busey, Engelbert Humperdinck, Lou Ferrigno, Jermaine Jackson, Don Kirshner and others. She has provided legal consultation to Red Buttons and Larry King.

She is owner of the IRestMyCase and RestMyCase registered trademarks for legal services, clothing, and dolls.

=== Media and television work ===
Roberts has appeared in various television programs and media productions, often as a legal analyst or personality. Her television credits include appearances on programs such as Celebrity Justice and Jury Duty, as well as commentary roles on news and entertainment platforms.

She has also been involved in film and television production, serving as a producer or executive producer on projects including Through Your Eyes (2007), Passengers (2003), and Wine Dancing (2015).

== Writing and poetry ==
Roberts is the author of Bourgeois Poetry (2019), a collection of poems written in a classical, metered style.

Her poetry has been featured by the Society of Classical Poets. Her work often explores themes of memory, relationships, and historical reflection.

She received Honorable Mention in the Society of Classical Poets International Poetry Competition in 2022 for Antietam and in 2023 for What Time Is It?.

Roberts was a co-author of the book Beyond a Reasonable Doubt, introduced by Larry King(2006).

In addition to writing, Roberts is a pianist and songwriter, composing music across multiple genres.

== Personal life ==
Roberts resides in Palm Beach County, Florida. She is married to Arthur Andelson, a former insurance agency manager, certified paralegal, talent agent and United States Air forces veteran. The couple has collaborated professionally, including in connection with the co-founding of the Kismet Talent Agency.

Through her maternal grandmother, Blanche Schildkraut Klein, Roberts is related to the Schildkraut family of actors, which includes Academy Award–winning actor Joseph Schildkraut and Yiddish stage actor Rudolph Schildkraut.

== Selected works ==
=== Books ===
- Bourgeois Poetry (2019)
- Beyond a Reasonable Doubt introduced by Larry King (2006; co-author)

== Filmography ==
Television
| Year | Title | Role | Notes |
|---|---|---|---|
| 2013 | Weiner Strudel | Actress, executive producer, pianist | Documentary Short |
| 2007 | Being Michael Madsen | Attorney Vicki Roberts | |
| 2008 | Jury Duty | Celebrity juror | Series regular |
| 2011-2012 | Geraldo at Large | Legal commentator | 2 episodes |
| 2009 | Sober House | Herself, Gary Busey's attorney | Episode 1.1 |
| 2009 | Disorder in the Court 8 | Herself | TV series |
| 2008 | Celebrity Rehab with Dr. Drew | Herself, Gary Busey's attorney | Episodes 2.6 & 2.9 |
| 2008 | Issues with Jane Velez-Mitchell | Commentator | Episode dated 2 December 2008 |
| 2008 | Disorder in the Court 6 | Herself | TV series |
| 2008 | Disorder in the Court 5 | Herself | TV series |
| 2006-2008 | Inside Edition | Herself | 6 episodes |
| 2005-2008 | Extra | Herself | 5 episodes |
| 2007 | Through Your Eyes | Actress & co-producer | |
| 2003-2005 | Celebrity Justice | Herself | 16 episodes |
| 2003-2004 | The Abrams Report | Herself | 2 episodes |
| 2003 | Passengers | Executive producer & producer | Short |
