= Top-rated United States television programs of 2014–15 =

This table displays the top-rated primetime television series of the 2014–15 season as measured by Nielsen Media Research.

Rank	Program	Network	Rating
1	Sunday Night Football	NBC	12.3
2	The Big Bang Theory	CBS	11.6
2	NCIS	CBS	11.6
4	NCIS: New Orleans	CBS	11.3
5	Empire	FOX	10.9
6	Thursday Night Football	CBS	10.6
7	Dancing with the Stars	ABC	9.7
8	Criminal Minds	CBS	9.0
8	Madam Secretary	CBS	9.0
8	Scandal	ABC	9.0
11	Blue Bloods	CBS	8.8
12	The Blacklist	NBC	8.7
13	The Voice: Monday	NBC	8.5
14	Scorpion	CBS	8.4
15	The Voice: Tuesday	NBC	8.3
16	The Good Wife	CBS	8.1
17	60 Minutes	CBS	7.8
17	Grey's Anatomy	ABC	7.8
17	Hawaii Five-0	CBS	7.8
20	How to Get Away with Murder	ABC	7.7
20	Person of Interest	CBS	7.7
22	NCIS: Los Angeles	CBS	7.6
23	Modern Family	ABC	7.5
23	Two and a Half Men	CBS	7.5
25	Elementary	CBS	7.3
25	The Mentalist	CBS	7.3
25	Mom	CBS	7.3
28	Castle	ABC	7.2
28	CSI: Crime Scene Investigation	CBS	7.2
28	CSI: Cyber	CBS	7.2
