= Celebrity Justice =

- Genre: News show/nontraditional court show
- Country of origin: United States
- No. of seasons: 3

Production
- Running time: 30 Minutes
- Production companies: Telepictures Productions (2003–2005) (seasons 2–3); Harvey Levin Productions; Time-Telepictures Television (2002–2003) (season 1)

Original release
- Network: Syndicated
- Release: September 2, 2002 – September 9, 2005

Celebrity Justice is an American news show/nontraditional court show which ran from 2002 to 2005. It was produced by Harvey Levin Productions, and directed by Brad Kreisburg. It was hosted by Holly Herbert and Carlos Diaz.

Despite its short and unremarkable run, Celebrity Justice has since become known as birthing and forming the format of Levin's later celebrity gossip project, the website TMZ (which was started as a co-collaboration between AOL and Celebrity Justice production company Telepictures and is now owned by the Fox Corporation), and the later program TMZ on TV, which has itself spun off two programs; TMZ Live and TMZ Sports.

== Production ==
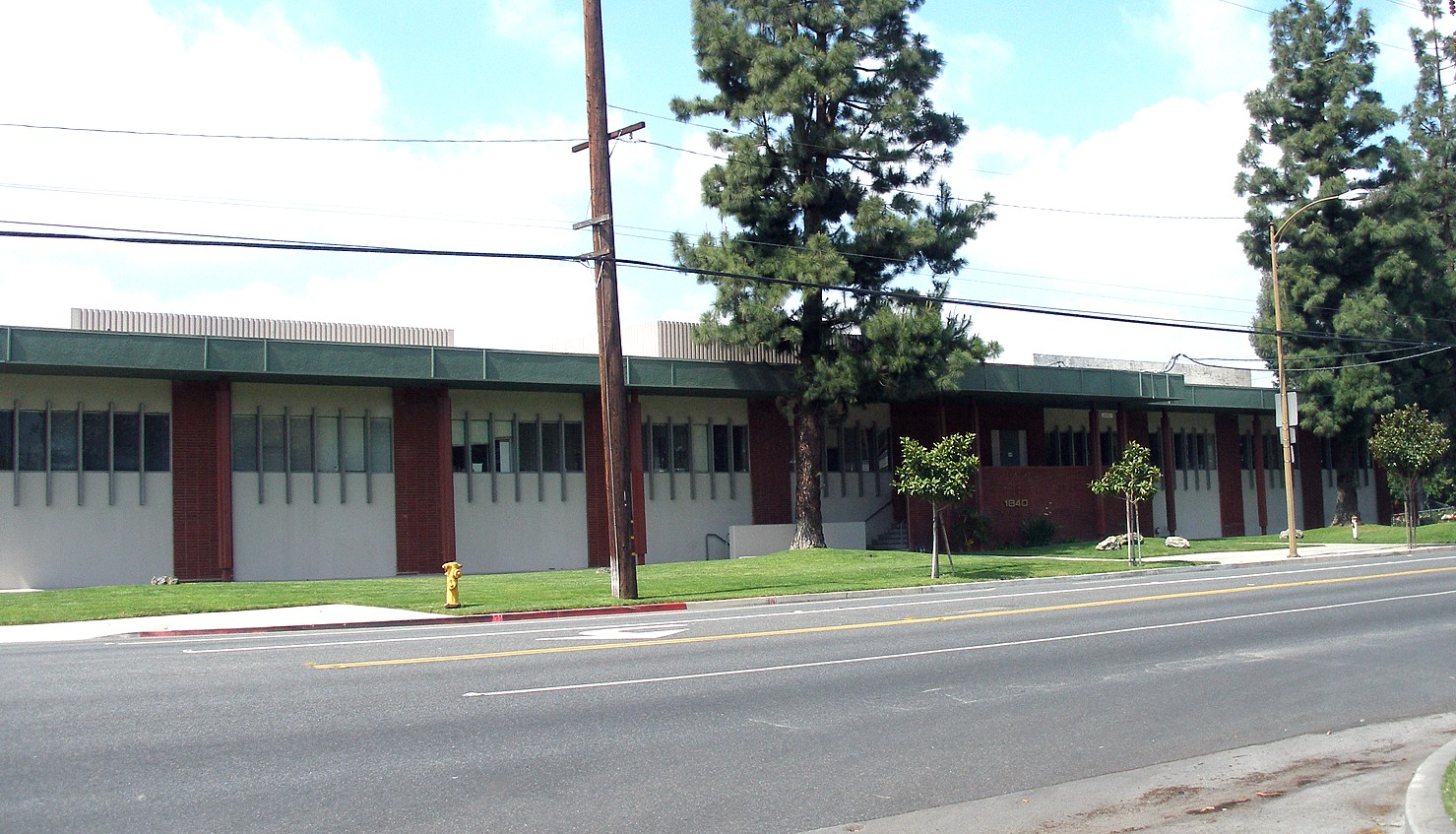
Victory Studios, in Glendale, California where Celebrity Justice was produced

- Company – Harvey Levin Productions
- Directors – Brad Kreisburg, Rob Dorn
- Writers – Carlos Diaz, Tony Federico, Holly Herbert, Evan Rosenblum, Danny Tobias
- Legal Commentator – Vicki Roberts

== Awards and nominations ==
- Genesis Award, 2005, TV News Magazine Syndicated (WON)

== Suggested further reading ==
- James L. Hirsen, Hollywood Nation: Left Coast Lies, Old Media Spin, and the New Media Revolution (2005), Crown Forum; ISBN 1-4000-8192-0
- Irving Rein, Philip Kotler, Michael Hamlin, Martin Stoller, High Visibility: Transforming Your Personal and Professional Brand (2005), McGraw-Hill Professional; ISBN 0-07-145680-5
