= Harvey Levin =

American television producer, legal analyst, journalist, and lawyer (born 1950)

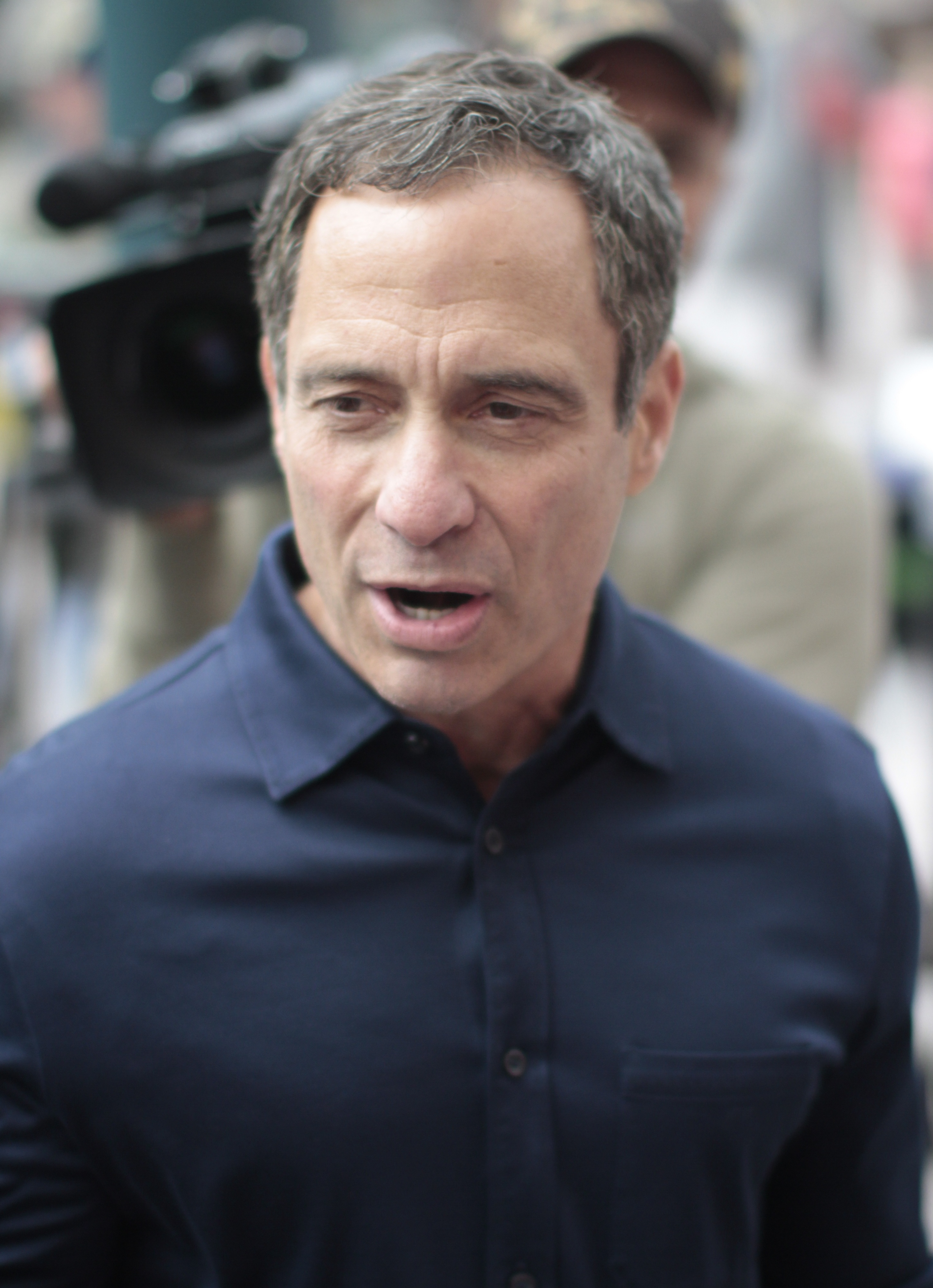
- Levin in 2010
- Born: Harvey Robert Levin; September 2, 1950 (age 76); Los Angeles, California, U.S.
- Education: University of California, Santa Barbara (BA); University of Chicago (JD)
- Occupations: Television producer; lawyer; legal analyst; journalist
- Known for: Founder of TMZ
- Partner: Andy Mauer

Harvey Robert Levin (born September 2, 1950) is an American television producer, legal analyst, journalist, and lawyer. He founded the celebrity news website TMZ in 2005 and later briefly served as the host of OBJECTified (2017–2018), which aired on the Fox News Channel.

== Early life and education ==
Levin was born September 2, 1950, in Los Angeles County, California, to a Jewish family. He attended high school at Grover Cleveland High School in Reseda, Los Angeles, and graduated in 1968 with honors. Levin attended the University of California, Santa Barbara, where he graduated with a B.A. in political science in 1972. He later attended the University of Chicago Law School and graduated with a J.D. in 1975.

== Career ==
=== Early law career and academia ===
Levin was an active attorney in California for two decades, from December 18, 1975, until January 1, 1996. In the mid-1970s, he taught law at the University of Miami School of Law under Soia Mentschikoff. He then practiced law briefly in Los Angeles before taking a position at Whittier College School of Law.

In 1978, Levin came to public attention following a series of high-profile debates with Howard Jarvis, the co-author of Proposition 13, California's controversial property tax-reduction ballot measure, which Levin opposed. With his newfound fame, Levin began to contribute legal advice on a radio show, where he was nicknamed "Doctor Law", as well as to write columns for the Los Angeles Times. His columnist career with the Times spanned seven years.

=== Transition to entertainment ===
Levin covered legal issues for KNBC-TV in 1982. He subsequently joined KCBS-TV and spent a decade doing investigative reporting and legal analysis, most notably covering the O. J. Simpson murder case. In 1997, he was named co-executive producer and on-air legal anchor for The People's Court. Levin remained on the show until its cancellation in July 2023. He created Celebrity Justice, which ran from 2002 to 2005.

Levin produced Beyond Twisted, which aired in 2009 for one season before being canceled. He created Famous in 12 (2014), an experiment in exploiting a family for quick fame, but the show was canceled after less than one season, with only five of the scheduled twelve episodes having aired.

This is not television. It's rawer, it's urgent, it's less produced. I really think this is the future. People want to get what they can get on-demand, and they have as much access to a computer as they do a TV set.

— Levin in a 2005 interview with Television Week

In 2005, AOL and Telepictures Productions launched TMZ with Levin as the founder and managing editor. The website quickly rose to prominence when it broke the story of Mel Gibson's DUI arrest and subsequent antisemitic rant. It continued to break a number of high-profile stories including the abuse of Rihanna by Chris Brown and the deaths of Heath Ledger, Brittany Murphy, ⁣Michael Jackson, and Kobe Bryant. The Los Angeles Times named TMZ's coverage of the Jackson death as the biggest story the website had covered to date.

Harvey Levin Productions has produced Levin's media projects since he joined The People's Court in 1983 as the show's legal consultant. In 1985, Levin wrote The People's Court: How to Tell It to the Judge, reviewing and providing commentary on several cases from the show. The Library Journal "recommended [the book] for public libraries."

== Personal life ==
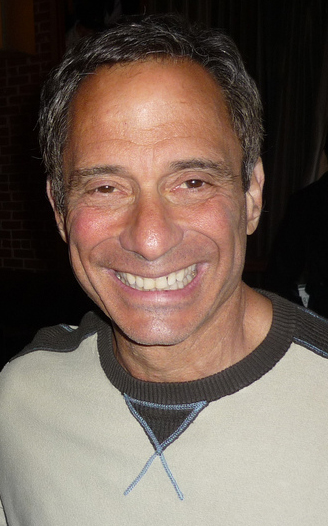
Levin in 2010

Levin appeared as an event speaker for the National Lesbian and Gay Journalists Association in April 2010 in which he publicly confirmed his self-identification as gay. He discussed his fear of losing his career if someone were to find out, which led to Levin compartmentalizing his personal and professional lives.

Levin's longtime partner is Andy Mauer, a chiropractor in Southern California. The two own multiple properties together, sharing joint-deed listings since the late 1990s and early 2000s. Levin has been named to Out magazine's "Power 50" list as one of the most influential voices in LGBT America since 2012 when he was named No. 15. He has since been named No. 25 in 2013, No. 34 in 2014, No. 48 in 2015, and No. 40 in 2016.

Levin supported Donald Trump in the run-up to the 2016 United States presidential election. Following the election, he met with Trump in the Oval Office on March 7, 2017, and chatted for an hour. However, by August 2018, he distanced himself from Trump over the president's repeated attempts to establish a transgender military ban. He became an increasingly vocal opponent of Trump in the years following.

== Filmography ==
- Volcano (1997) – Reporter
- Celebrity Justice – Host
- TMZ (2005 to present) – Himself
- Family Guy S-8 Ep-14 (2010) – "Peter-assment"

== Books ==
- The People's Court: How to Tell it to the Judge (1985)

== Awards and honors ==
For his broadcast work, Levin has been nominated for nine Emmys.
