= SlideShow (TV series) =

- Genre: Game show
- Based on: Vendredi tout est permis by Satisfaction – The Television Agency
- Presented by: Grant Denyer
- Starring: Cal Wilson; Toby Truslove
- Country of origin: Australia
- Original language: English
- No. of seasons: 1
- No. of episodes: 13

Production
- Running time: 60 minutes
- Production company: Shine Australia

Original release
- Network: Seven Network

Related
- Riot

SlideShow was an Australian light entertainment game show television series hosted by Grant Denyer, which first screened on the Seven Network on 7 August 2013.

SlideShow was based on a French program Vendredi Tout est Permis Avec Arthur. Two teams of three celebrities competed in a number of challenges and parlour games, including one on a huge set that slides. The weekly team captains were Cal Wilson and Toby Truslove.

In February 2014, the show was officially cancelled after not being renewed for a second season.

== Episodes ==
No.	Title	Original release date	Australian viewers
1	Episode 1	7 August 2013	1,364,000
Game Participants: Anh Do, Geoff Paine, Johnny Ruffo & Tiffiny Hall
2	Episode 2	14 August 2013	1,070,000
Game Participants: Frank Woodley, Jo Stanley, Lee Naimo, Russell Gilbert
3	Episode 3	21 August 2013	980,000
Game Participants: George Houvardas, Mike McLeish, Michala Banas, Rebecca De Unamuno
4	Episode 4	28 August 2013	988,000
Game Participants: Andrew McClelland, Melanie Vallejo, Nicola Parry, Rob Palmer
5	Episode 5	4 September 2013	861,000
Game Participants: Jason Geary, Jimmy James Eaton, Liz Ellis, Sophie Monk
6	Episode 6	11 September 2013	920,000
Game Participants: Anthony Callea, Frank Woodley, Giaan Rooney, Jimmy James Eaton
7	Episode 7	18 September 2013	815,000
Game Participants: Colin Lane, Jason Geary, Kate McLennan, Shura Taft
8	Episode 8	25 September 2013	851,000
Game Participants: Damien Bodie, Jarred Christmas, Jane Harber, Tom Williams
9	Episode 9	16 October 2013	762,000
Game Participants: Dave Eastgate, Nadine Garner, Russell Robertson, Steen Raskopoulos
10	Episode 10	23 October 2013	715,000
Game Participants: Andrew McClelland, Erika Heynatz, Kate McLennan, Lawrence Mooney
11	Episode 11	30 October 2013	652,000
Game Participants: Brynne Edelsten, Colin Lane, Geoff Paine, Jimmy James Eaton
12	Episode 12	6 November 2013	621,000
Game Participants: Amanda Bishop, Gretel Killeen, Scott Brennan, Tom Williams
13	Episode 13	13 November 2013	741,000
Game Participants: Damien Leith, Jane Allsop, Rebecca De Unamuno, Rik Brown

== Games ==
- Slide on Over

The showpiece game takes place inside a sliding room set at a 22.5 degree angle. Each team acts out an improvised scene (with the occasional prompt from host Denyer) while also negotiating the steep incline.

- Photo Mime

One team-member looks at a screen and mimes out the image projected for their team members to guess. The image may be anything from an object to a well-known personality.

- Trapezier Said Than Done

One team member suspended from the roof by a harness acts out common expressions for their teammates to guess – all while being lifted higher and higher off the floor.

- ABC Story

All three team members act out a scene where every new line must start with the next letter of the alphabet. The first sentence starts with "A", the next with "B" and so forth until the scene ends with a sentence starting with "Z".

- Shadow Puppets

Two team members are placed behind a shadow screen with props to mime out a movie title for their third team member to guess.

- Danswers

One team member tries to get their teammates to guess a word – all while being twirled around by professional dancers. Includes cameos from Dancing with the Stars' Carmelo Pizzino and Jessica Raffa.

- Alpha Body

This game involves two team members lying on the floor and contorting their bodies in unison to create letters individually to spell out a word. This can be seen from an overhead camera to make sure performers spell correctly.

- Drawn Out

One team member sketches while the other team members guess what they're drawing.

- Just Say It

One team member must get the other to guess certain words by explaining them, without saying the specific word – while the two act out a scene together.

== Release ==
Shine International's parent company represents the format internationally, and apart from the Australian and French versions, local-language versions of the show have screened in Thailand, Finland, Portugal, Denmark, Spain, Brazil, Ukraine, Romania and Vietnam

=== International versions ===
The international rights are produced by Satisfaction – The Television Agency and distributed by Endemol Shine Group.

Country	Title	Presenter	Broadcaster	Premiere	Finale
France (original version)	Vendredi tout est permis (VTEP) ("On Fridays, Anything Goes with Arthur", aka Anything Goes)	Arthur	TF1	16 December 2011	present
Algeria	Vendredi Machi Adi avec Sofiane	Sofiane Dani; Amine ben Said	Echorouk TV/since 2019 on Numidia TV; Al-Dar Algeria	4 March 2017	present
Australia	SlideShow	Grant Denyer	Seven Network	7 August 2013	13 November 2013
Bulgaria	С Рачков всичко е възможно With Rachkov, anything is possible	Dimitar Rachkov	Nova	10 September 2022	31 December 2022
Canada (French)	Ce soir tout est permis	Éric Salvail	V	17 November 2014	6 May 2016
Colombia	Me caigo de la risa	Jorge Enrique Abello	RCN Televisión	5 March 2016	28 May 2016
Denmark	Rundt på gulvet	Lars Hjortshøj	TV 2	31 August 2013	7 September 2013
Germany	Jetzt wird’s schräg	Jochen Schropp	Sat.1	19 July 2014	present
Indonesia	Slide Show	Raffi Ahmad	Trans TV	10 February 2014	12 September 2014
Israel	הכל הולך; Hakol Holekh; VTEP Israel	Dvir Benedek	Channel 2, as of 2017 Reshet 13	7 November 2014	present
Italy	Stasera tutto è possibile	Amadeus (2015-2018); Stefano De Martino (2019-present)	Rai 2	8 September 2015	present
Jordan	جمعة مش عادية; Djomaa Mesh Adieh	Abdallah Al-Ammari	Channel 1 ON TV	2020	present
Lebanon	الليلة جنون; Laylé Jnoun	Mario Bassil	MTV Lebanon	8 November 2013	present
Mexico	Me caigo de risa	Faisy	Televisa	4 March 2014	present
Netherlands	Alles mag op vrijdag	Jandino Asporaat	RTL 4	20 April 2014	present
Norway	Alt er lov	Solveig Kloppen	TV2	28 February 2015	14 May 2016
Poland	Anything Goes. Ale jazda!	Elżbieta Romanowska	TVP2	11 September 2020	present
Portugal	Vale Tudo	João Manzarra	SIC	13 January 2013	11 May 2014
Romania	Totul e permis	Cosmin Seleși	Antena 1	5 January 2014	11 February 2014
Russia	Возможно всё! Vozmozhno Vso!	Timur Rodriguez	Rossiya-1	4 February 2022	
Slovenia	Vse je mogoče	Bojan Emeršič	TV Slovenija	4 October 2015	present
Spain	Me resbala	Arturo Valls	Antena 3	15 November 2013	18 August 2021
Spain	Me resbala	Lara Álvarez	Telecinco	27 June 2023	22 August 2023
Tunisia	نهار الأحد ما يهمك في حد نهار الأحد ما يهمك في حد	Sami Fehri; Nidhal Saadi; Amine Gara (22 March 2020); Aymen Ammar; Wassim Migalo	Elhiwar Ettounsi	24 September 2017	present
Tunisia	100 Façons	Amine Gara	Attessia TV	26 October 2016	26 May 2017
Thailand	เกมตลกหกคะเมน; Game Talok Hokkhamen	Kiattisak Udomnak	Thairath TV	October 3, 2015	January 30, 2016
Turkey	Dur Durabilirsen	Engin Hepiler	aTV	30 May 2014	6 July 2014
USA	Riot	Rove McManus	Fox	13 May 2014	10 June 2014
Uruguay	Me resbala	Rafael Villanueva	Teledoce	4 February 2015	4 July 2015
Vietnam	Chết Cười	Đức Hải	VTV3	17 January 2015	25 April 2015
