= Cedric's Barber Battle =

US television program

- Genre: Reality
- Created by: Cedric the Entertainer
- Presented by: Cedric the Entertainer
- Country of origin: United States
- No. of seasons: 1
- No. of episodes: 8

Production
- Executive producers: Cedric the Entertainer; Mark Efman
- Running time: 22 minutes

Original release
- Network: The CW
- Release: April 17 – July 27, 2015

Cedric's Barber Battle is an American reality television series that aired on The CW. The show premiered on April 17, 2015. It is a barber competition series hosted by Cedric the Entertainer. The first season consists of 10 episodes, however, only 8 aired.

On August 23, 2016, The CW cancelled Cedric's Barber Battle after one season.

== Episodes ==
No.	Title	Original release date	U.S. viewers (millions)
1	"Long Beach"	April 17, 2015	0.79
2	"San Antonio"	April 24, 2015	0.82
3	"Hollywood"	May 1, 2015	0.67
4	"Newark"	June 29, 2015	0.53
5	"Los Angeles"	July 6, 2015	0.74
6	"Austin"	July 13, 2015	1.03
7	"Queens"	July 20, 2015	0.75
8	"SF Valley"	July 27, 2015	0.79
