= A Wicked Offer =

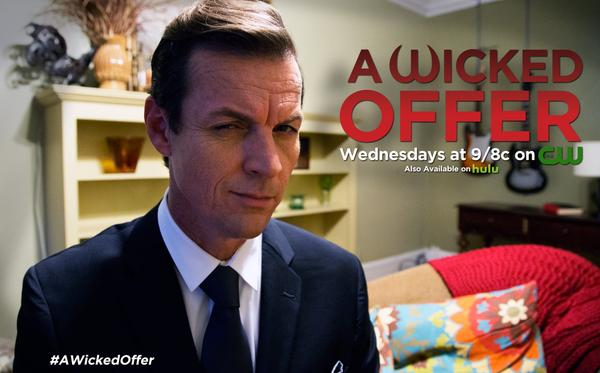
- Genre: Reality
- Presented by: Matthew J. O'Connor
- Country of origin: United States
- Original language: English
- No. of seasons: 1
- No. of episodes: 8

Production
- Executive producers: Bobby Sizemore; Jenny Daly
- Running time: 42 minutes
- Production company: T Group Productions

Original release
- Network: The CW
- Release: August 5 – September 23, 2015

A Wicked Offer is an American reality television series that aired on The CW. The show, hosted by Attorney Matthew J. O'Connor, premiered on Wednesday, August 5, 2015. It was a competition series in which couples completed tasks to earn cash prizes.

== Episodes ==
No.	Title	Original release date	U.S. viewers (millions)
1	"When Kush Comes to Shove"	August 5, 2015	0.69
2	"Grin and Bare It"	August 12, 2015	0.71
3	"A Session Confession"	August 19, 2015	0.64
4	"The Joke's on You"	August 26, 2015	0.67
5	"Wurst Taste Scenario"	September 2, 2015	0.59
6	"Immaculate Deception"	September 9, 2015	0.68
7	"Get Rich or Cry Trying"	September 16, 2015	0.43
8	"Here Comes the Bribe"	September 23, 2015	0.50
