= Jury Duty (2007 TV series) =

American reality court show (2007–2008)

- Genre: Nontraditional arbitration-based reality court show
- Created by: Vincent Dymon
- Written by: Rob George
- Starring: Bruce Cutler
- Theme music composer: David Kole
- Country of origin: United States
- Original language: English
- No. of seasons: 1

Production
- Executive producers: Linda Dymon; Vincent Dymon; Susan Winston
- Running time: 30 minutes
- Production company: Radar Entertainment

Original release
- Network: Syndication
- Release: September 17, 2007 – May 30, 2008

Jury Duty is an American syndicated nontraditional/arbitration-based reality court show that premiered on September 17, 2007. Initial market clearances, according to Broadcasting & Cable, were at least 60 percent of the nation's television markets. The show was produced and distributed by Radar Entertainment.

Episodes of the show were lost until January 29, 2021, when they were uploaded to YouTube.

== Format ==
While the show's general concept shared that of most court shows, where two litigants in a civil case present their interpretation of a dispute before a "judge" (in this case, former defense attorney Bruce Cutler), Jury Duty differed drastically in format. As opposed to the bench trial format used in most court shows, Jury Duty used a jury trial to arrive at a verdict. To boot, the show used a panel of three celebrities that served as the show's titular "jury," and who were given their notices at the beginning of each episode.

The presentation of the case was divided into two segments. The first segment was conducted as normal court shows, with Cutler hearing the litigants' arguments. The second segment involved the three jurors cross-examining the litigants, after which Cutler gave the jury their instructions and reminded them what they must do to determine a verdict.

After the commercial break following the presentation of the case, the litigants were taken out of the courtroom and the home audience was shown the panel's deliberations. Whatever they decided was revealed to the litigants in the next segment.

As in a regular criminal case, the three jurors must come to a unanimous verdict. If they couldn't do that, then Cutler rendered his own verdict (just like in most small claims cases and TV court shows). After the verdict was presented, the show closed with the jurors giving their reactions to the case.
