= I Wanna Marry "Harry" =

Reality television show

- Genre: Competitive reality dating show
- Created by: Danny Fenton
- Starring: Matthew Hicks; Paul Leonard
- Country of origin: United States
- Original language: English
- No. of seasons: 1
- No. of episodes: 8

Production
- Executive producers: Danny Fenton; Kevin Utton; Matt Gould; Ryan Seacrest; Adam Sher; Heather Schuster; David Tibballs; Rebecca Eisen
- Production companies: Zig Zag Productions; Ryan Seacrest Productions

Original release
- Network: Fox
- Release: May 20 – June 11, 2014

I Wanna Marry "Harry" is an American reality television show that premiered on May 20, 2014, on Fox. The series has a premise similar to Joe Millionaire, and follows twelve American women who are manipulated into believing that they are competing for the affections of Prince Harry. However, in reality, the bachelor is Matthew Hicks, a Prince Harry look-alike.

On June 12, 2014, it was announced that the show was pulled from the air in the U.S. and cancelled after airing only four episodes. Although not broadcast, the last four episodes were made available on Fox.com, the Fox NOW app, cable On Demand and Hulu. The complete series was broadcast on the ITV2 channel in the UK, on Latin-American E! throughout Latin America (especially in Mexico, Colombia and Argentina) in February 2015, and on Network Ten in Australia.

== Background ==
At first, the contestants are not explicitly told that the bachelor is Prince Harry; they are merely led to make that inference on their own by Hicks' close resemblance, the royal setting of Englefield House, the lavish dates, and being surrounded by real professional servants and a security detail that really does have experience protecting heads of state. Hicks is referred to in the contestants' presence only as "Sir." However, in the 5th episode, Hicks tells Kelly while they are alone that he is Prince Harry, and later the butler Kingsley announces to all seven remaining contestants at the dinner table that "Sir is indeed His Royal Highness Prince Harry of Wales."

In a 2015, interview with Fusion TV, contestant Kimberly Birch explained that the production crew "really messed with us", and "were really trying everything they possibly could to convince us that [Hicks] was [Harry]", including having a member of the crew pose as a therapist who told the contestants that they needed to stop doubting the situation; ultimately, Birch compared it to brainwashing.

Contestant Andrea Fox, in an interview on the Kidd Kraddick in the Morning radio show, said that prior to filming the contestants were told they were going to be on a TV show called "Dream Date" and that it was more about "the experience for the girls" instead of "finding love", and that people with the show kept saying "Don't compare it to The Bachelor".

The butler on the show, only referred to as Kingsley, is portrayed by English actor Paul Leonard.

The series first aired in the USA on May 20, 2014, on Fox. On June 12, 2014, Fox cancelled I Wanna Marry "Harry" after four of the eight produced episodes due to low ratings but announced it would air the remainder on Fox.com, cable On Demand, Fox NOW and Hulu.

It began airing in the UK on ITV2 on Wednesday, June 4, 2014, at 9:00pm.

== Ratings ==
The first episode aired on Fox following the last season 13 American Idol performance show and had a 1.5 household rating, with a 0.7 for adults 18–49. The second show, which followed Riot, had a 1.0 household rating, with a 0.4 for viewers 18–49. The third episode had 1.04 million live + "same day DVR" viewers with a rating for adults 18-49 of 0.4 (adults 18-49 share: 1).

ITV2 broadcast the first and second shows on the same night (June 4, 2014) and the first show drew 286,000 viewers (1.2%) from 9pm-10pm, while the second show drew 274,000 viewers (1.7%) from 10pm to 11pm.

== Reviews ==
Time magazine reviewed the US premiere, comparing it as "weirdly similar, down to minor details" to Joe Millionaire. However, unlike Joe Millionaire, the magazine noted, there is no shame or guilt in the deception, which Time attributed to reality TV learning to become "lighter in tone yet more slick and ruthless".

In the UK, The Telegraph headlined its review "fodder for the braindead" and commenting "the floundering Harry lookalike wasn't a wild or weird enough character to carry the show, entertainment derived solely from the foolish bachelorettes." But it picks out the butler, Kingsley, as a "genre-bender of genius" who strays far from his brief.

In 2024, BBC Sounds created a podcast, The Bachelor of Buckingham Palace, about the series.

== The Bachelor ==
The bachelor, Matthew Hicks, now a physics teacher at Cardinal Newman Roman Catholic secondary school in Rhondda Cynon Taff, worked for an environmental consultancy firm. He had previously done some very small-scale impersonations of Prince Harry, but otherwise had no prior acting experience. Before filming began, Hicks had his natural blond hair dyed ginger to match Prince Harry's hair colour, and was given brief training in "princely" activities he would need for the show, such as horseback riding, fencing and ballroom dancing. Hicks was also taught extensive information about Prince Harry, to help Hicks be able to respond to contestants appropriately.

Show creator, Danny Fenton, said in an interview on Good Morning Britain that he talked to over 100 potential Harry lookalikes from multiple countries before selecting Hicks.

== Contestants ==
Contestants on I Wanna Marry "Harry"
Name	Age	Hometown	Job	Crown suite	Eliminated
Kimberly Birch	24	Malverne, Long Island, New York	Social worker, model and actress	Week 2, 6	Winner
Karina Kennedy	25	Palos Hills, Illinois	Physical therapist	Week 3	Week 8 (runner-up)
Kelley Andrews	25	Mobile, Alabama	Hostess	Week 4	Week 8 (3rd Place)
Rose Copeland	23	Westlake Village, California	Special preschool teacher	Week 1	Week 7
Meghan Ramsey Jones	26	Dallas, Texas	Artist	Week 5	Week 6
Jacqueline Conroy	25	Rockville Centre, Long Island, New York (Fox biography gives New York, New York)	Nutritionist/model/actor		Week 6
Maggie Toraason	25	Peru, Illinois	Account executive		Week 5
Anna Lisa Matias	24	San Francisco, California	Miss LA		Week 4
Chelsea Brookshire	22	Long Beach, California	Actress/model		Week 4 (Quit)
Carley Hawkins	24	Buffalo, Missouri	Instructional pre-med student		Week 3
Andrea Fox	25	Longview, Texas	Lead development representative		Week 2
Leah Thom	24	Fort Worth, Texas	Cocktail waitress		Week 1

== Elimination table ==
Contestants eliminated in I Wanna Marry "Harry"
Name	E01	E02	E03	E04	E05	E06	E07	E08
Kimberly	SAFE	CROWN	SAFE	SAFE	SAFE	CROWN	SAFE	WIN
Karina	SAFE	SAFE	CROWN	SAFE	SAFE	SAFE	SAFE	OUT
Kelley	SAFE	SAFE	SAFE	CROWN	SAFE	SAFE	SAFE	OUT
Rose	CROWN	SAFE	SAFE	SAFE	SAFE	SAFE	OUT	
Jacqueline	SAFE	SAFE	SAFE	SAFE	SAFE	OUT		
Meghan	SAFE	SAFE	SAFE	SAFE	CROWN	OUT		
Maggie	SAFE	SAFE	SAFE	SAFE	OUT			
Anna	SAFE	SAFE	SAFE	OUT				
Chelsea	SAFE	SAFE	SAFE	LEFT				
Carley	SAFE	SAFE	OUT					
Andrea	SAFE	OUT						
Leah	OUT							

Key
(WIN) The contestant won the competition.
(CROWN) The contestant got the Crown Suite.
(SAFE) The contestant was safe.
(LEFT) The contestant quit the competition.
(OUT) The contestant was eliminated.
