= Knock Knock Live =

2015 American reality TV series

- Genre: Reality show
- Presented by: Ryan Seacrest
- Country of origin: United States
- Original language: English
- No. of seasons: 1
- No. of episodes: 2

Production
- Executive producers: Simon Fuller; Michael Herwick; Allen Shapiro; Mike Mahan; Mark Bracco; Stijn Bakkers; Nicolle Yaron; Ryan Seacrest
- Camera setup: Multiple-camera setup
- Running time: 42 minutes
- Production companies: XIX Entertainment; Dick Clark Productions

Original release
- Network: Fox
- Release: July 21 – July 28, 2015

Knock Knock Live is an American reality television series starring Ryan Seacrest that debuted on Fox as an entry in the 2015–16 television season. It premiered on Tuesday, July 21, 2015 live at 9 pm ET, tape delayed at 9 pm PT.

In the show, Seacrest and guest celebrities would visit the homes of ordinary people who have done something special and give them a prize such as cash or a new car. Some would meet their celebrity crushes, or a random game would take place in their front yard or on their street. Seacrest said: "We've tailored all of our responses to hopefully put a smile on people's faces and change their life a little bit. The fun thing about it, for me, is that this is a live show, so we don't have an idea of what's gonna happen."

On July 30, 2015, Fox canceled the show after two episodes due to low ratings.

== Details ==
The premise of the show was that Seacrest and a fellow celebrity guest would knock on a random person's door and make their day by distributing prizes. Ariana Grande, Justin Bieber, Lea Michele, Meghan Trainor, Rob Gronkowski, Robin Thicke, Rita Ora, Martha Stewart, Bubba Watson, David Beckham, Demi Lovato, Mike Holmes, Adrienne Bailon, Florida Georgia Line, Ross Mathews and Common were scheduled to be on the show's first season.

== Episodes ==
No.	Title	Original release date	Viewers (millions)
1	"Episode One"	July 21, 2015	1.75
2	"Episode Two"	July 28, 2015	1.60
