= The Island (American TV series) =

- Genre: Reality
- Presented by: Bear Grylls
- Narrated by: Bear Grylls
- Country of origin: United States
- Original language: English
- No. of seasons: 1
- No. of episodes: 6

Production
- Executive producers: Bear Grylls; Eden Gaha; Delbert Shoopman; Holly Wofford; Michael Brooks
- Running time: 42–44 minutes
- Production companies: Endemol Shine North America; Bear Grylls Ventures

Original release
- Network: NBC
- Release: May 25 – July 6, 2015

The Island is an American survival skills reality television series, hosted by adventurer and survivalist Bear Grylls on NBC, which began airing on May 25, 2015.

== Synopsis ==
Bear Grylls seeks to find out whether a modern American man can survive on a deserted island for one month without the luxuries or the basics of contemporary everyday life. Unlike traditional reality television shows, The Island does not include any prizes, eliminations, or winners.

== Production ==
It is based on the British series The Island with Bear Grylls. The first season has six episodes. In the UK all episodes are available on All 4. In the series' premiere, fourteen men from various occupations and backgrounds are taken to a remote, uninhabited island by Bear Grylls, where they were left completely alone. Filming themselves, the men hunt for food, source water, erect shelter, build community and try to survive using only their strength, determination and know-how. They are equipped with limited tools, a basic medical kit, and a satellite phone for medical emergencies. On August 16, 2016, NBC cancelled The Island after one season.

== Cast ==
- Rob Brothers, Stay-at-home Father
- Davion Carrillo, Firefighter
- Taylor Cole, Radio Producer
- Matthew Getz, Embedded Cameraman
- Benji Lanpher, Embedded Cameraman
- Earnest Marshall, Iraq War Veteran
- Dakota Mortensen, Bird Farmer
- Jim Murray, Retired Police Chief
- Jud Nichols, Criminal Defense Attorney
- Dr. Buck Parker M.D., Trauma Surgeon
- Michael Rossini, Engineer
- Graham Sheldon, Embedded Cameraman
- Rick Smith, Embedded Cameraman
- Trey Williams, Digital Marketing Manager

Evacuated off the island

- Taylor Cole (medical, episode 1)
- Michael Rossini (medical, episode 2)
- Davion Carrillo (medical, episode 3)
- Earnest Marshall (personal issues, episode 4)
- Trey Williams (medical, episode 5)

== Episodes ==
| No. | Title | Original release date | U.S. viewers (millions) |
|---|---|---|---|
| 1 | "Man Up" | May 25, 2015 | 3.75 |
Fourteen men are dropped on a deserted island, where they must work together to survive. Bear Grylls hosts.
| 2 | "No Water, No Life" | June 1, 2015 | 3.65 |
The men struggle to find fresh water while battling exhaustion, dehydration and each other.
| 3 | "Easier Said Than Done" | June 8, 2015 | 3.61 |
The men grow desperate for food, and the mental and physical challenges take their toll on more than one participant.
| 4 | "Expect the Unexpected" | June 22, 2015 | 3.23 |
The men finally get food, but the group begins to splinter and some even consider calling it quits.
| 5 | "Anything Can Happen" | June 29, 2015 | 3.26 |
A divide among camps threatens the group's success. One man continues to suffer from an earlier medical incident while another has a dangerous accident.
| 6 | "The Things That Really Matter" | July 6, 2015 | 3.17 |
The conflict with one member of the community comes to a head, and the men reflect upon their life-changing experience as the survival adventure winds down.
