= American Dream Builders =

American home improvement reality competition

- Genre: Reality competition; Home improvement
- Presented by: Nate Berkus
- Judges: Eddie George; Monica Pedersen
- Country of origin: United States
- Original language: English
- No. of seasons: 1
- No. of episodes: 10

Production
- Executive producers: Nate Berkus; Tom Shelly; Jason Ehrlich
- Running time: 42 minutes
- Production companies: Universal Television; Steele Mill Productions

Original release
- Network: NBC
- Release: March 23 – May 25, 2014

American Dream Builders is an American home improvement reality competition that premiered on NBC on March 23, 2014. The 10-episode series is hosted by Nate Berkus, while Eddie George and Monica Pedersen judge the competition.

== Premise ==
The series follows twelve contestants as they perform major renovations on two homes each week.

== Contestants ==
The competitors are all home designers and/or home builders from across the United States.

=== Competitors ===
- Lukas Machnik – Chicago, Illinois - Winner
- Jay Riordan – Chicago, Illinois - Eliminated Week 10 (runner-up)
- Elaine Griffin – New York City, New York - Eliminated Week 9
- Nina Magon – Houston, Texas - Eliminated Week 9
- Darren Moore – Los Angeles, California - Eliminated Week 8
- Dann Foley – Palm Springs, California - Eliminated Week 7
- Erinn Valencich – Los Angeles, California - Eliminated Week 6
- Vanessa Deleon – Edgewater, New Jersey - Eliminated Week 5
- Andrew Flesher – New York City, New York - Eliminated Week 4
- Christina Salway – Brooklyn, New York - Eliminated Week 3
- Nancy Hadley – Huntington Beach, California - Eliminated Week 2
- Tarrick Love – Nashville, Tennessee - Eliminated Week 1

== Episodes ==
No.	Title	Original release date	U.S. viewers (millions)
1	"The Tudors"	March 23, 2014	3.60
2	"Mid Century Modern"	March 30, 2014	3.10
3	"Spanish Style"	April 6, 2014	2.92
4	"Cabins in the Woods"	April 7, 2014	5.08
5	"Modern Modulars"	April 13, 2014	3.09
6	"California Craftsman"	April 20, 2014	2.31
7	"Colonial Duplex"	April 27, 2014	2.57
8	"Downtown Lofts"	May 4, 2014	2.17
9	"Victorian"	May 18, 2014	1.77
10	"Beach Home"	May 25, 2014	1.70

== Broadcast ==
In Australia, the series premiered on September 9, 2015, on LifeStyle Home.
