= Famous in 12 =

- Genre: Reality television; Social experiment
- Presented by: Harvey Levin
- Country of origin: United States
- Original language: English
- No. of seasons: 1
- No. of episodes: 5

Production
- Executive producers: David Garfinkle; Harvey Levin; Jay Renfroe
- Camera setup: Multiple
- Running time: 42 minutes
- Production companies: Harvey Levin Productions; Renegade 83 Entertainment; Telepictures; Warner Horizon Television

Original release
- Network: The CW
- Release: June 3 – July 1, 2014

Famous in 12 is an American reality television and social experiment series that aired on The CW. Premiering on June 3, 2014, the series chronicles the Artiaga family as they relocate to Los Angeles in order to seek fame over the course of 12 weeks. TMZ and Harvey Levin provide the family with opportunities and situations to increase their chances. While on the series, the family continues to build their brand utilizing social media to interact with viewers. Each week features a "star power meter" that calculates which individual family member is receiving the most interest. The show was canceled in week five and the family was sent home early due to lack of viewer interest. On July 2, 2014, the series ended after one season due to unknown reasons. The show was completely taken off the air on July 2, 2014.

== Cast ==
- Mike Artiaga
- Angie Artiaga
- Jameelah Artiaga
- Maariyah Artiaga
- Taliah Artiaga

== Episodes ==
No.	Title	Original release date	U.S. viewers (millions)
1	"Are We Famous Yet?"	June 3, 2014	0.61
2	"Fast Cars and Fancy Fur"	June 10, 2014	0.63
3	"Lace, Leather and Karma"	June 17, 2014	0.49
4	"Crazy as Hell"	June 24, 2014	0.53
5	"Hitting a High Note"	July 1, 2014	0.47
