= Riot (TV series) =

American game show

- Slide Show/Riot logo
- Genre: Game show Entertainment
- Based on: French series Vendredi tout est permis Australian series Slide Show
- Developed by: France: Arthur; United States: Steve Carell; Shine America
- Written by: Evan Mann; John C. Plummer; Gareth Reynolds
- Directed by: Ron de Moraes
- Presented by: Rove McManus
- Starring: Rove McManus; Brian Palermo; John Ross Bowie; Jamie Denbo; Jordan Black; Rob Gleeson; Meryl Hathaway; Jessica McKenna
- Country of origin: United States
- Original language: English
- No. of seasons: 1
- No. of episodes: 13

Production
- Executive producers: Steve Carell; Paul Franklin; Eden Gaha; Adam Zuvich; Jim Biederman; Rich Brown
- Running time: 60 minutes
- Production companies: Satisfaction – The Television Agency; Carousel; Shine America

Original release
- Network: Fox
- Release: May 13 – June 10, 2014

Riot is an American game show comedy television series from Fox and based upon the Australian Slide Show television series, itself based upon the Arthur-created French program Vendredi tout est permis ("On Fridays, Anything Goes with Arthur", aka Anything Goes), where two teams of celebrities competed in a number of challenges and games, including one on a huge set that tilts at 22½ degrees. Hosted by Rove McManus, weekly episode "guest" captains include a rotating set of actors, with Andy Buckley and Steve Carell "captaining" the premiere episode. Riot was canceled by Fox on June 12, 2014.

== Format ==
The show's concept places two teams of celebrities and comedians in a series of competitions that have the teams sing, dance and create comedy sketches while overcoming multiple mental and physical obstacles. Instructed by guest team captains, two teams of comedians are instructed to create and participate in a set of unscripted improv skits, some of which take place on a set tilted at 22-1/2 degrees or some of which take place in complete darkness with the audience able to observe through night-vision cameras while the contestants blunder about.

== Regular cast ==
The series "regular" main cast includes

- Rove McManus as host
- Brian Palermo
- John Ross Bowie
- Jamie Denbo
- Jordan Black
- Rob Gleeson
- Meryl Hathaway
- Jessica McKenna

=== Guest stars ===
Weekly episode "guest" team captains include a rotating set of actors, including:

- Jason Alexander
- David Arquette
- Mayim Bialik
- Michael Ian Black
- Andy Buckley
- Steve Carell
- Rob Delaney
- Andy Dick
- Tom Green
- Cheryl Hines
- D.L. Hughley
- Orlando Jones
- Chris Kattan
- Oscar Nunez
- Will Sasso
- Nicole Sullivan

== Games ==
- Slide Show: Players perform a scene on a set built at a 22-degree angle with the cameras tilted to make the floor appear to be level. This game is played twice per episode.
- A Bunch of Jerks: Several players act out scenes wearing suits attached to cables from the studio rafters and when anyone makes a mistake, they are jerked up nearly 20 feet off the floor.
- Mime Sweeper: A performer stands on a pedestal and has ten seconds to mime the identity of an image shown on a screen to another whose back is turned to the screen. Every time the second performer fails to guess the image, the first performer is knocked off by a large medicine ball and is replaced by another.
- Alphabody: Two players form the letters in a four-letter word in any order using only their bodies for ten seconds per letter. After the last letter is formed, the host tries to guess the word.
- In The Dark: Players act out a scene in a pitch-black room, while those in the studio can see everything due to infra-red cameras.
- Shadow Puppets: Players act out movie titles, etc. behind a back-lit white screen for another to guess.
- Floored: Players perform on the floor while an overhead camera makes them appear to be standing.
- Dogs at Work: A dog is dressed like a human, with human hands using the sleeves to interact with players.

== Development and production ==
In October 2013, Fox greenlit production of an American version of Vendredi Tout est Permis Avec Arthur, from Steve Carell and Shine America, to be produced by Shine America with Carell's banner, Carousel TV. Fox ordered 8 episodes, which were filmed during February 2014 and premiered on May 13, 2014.

== Episodes ==
No.	Captain 1	Captain 2	Original release date	U.S. viewers (millions)
1	Steve Carell	Andy Buckley	May 13, 2014	1.34
Games performed: Slide Show, A Bunch of Jerks, Mime Sweeper, Alphabody, In The Dark, Shadow Puppets
2	Jason Alexander	Cheryl Hines	May 27, 2014	1.36
3	Tom Green	Andy Dick	June 3, 2014	1.15
4	Rob Delaney	David Arquette	June 10, 2014	1.18
Games performed: Slide Show, A Bunch of Jerks, Mime Sweeper, Dogs at Work, Floored, Alphabody, In The Dark, Shadow Puppets

== Reception ==
Riot received mixed to positive reviews from television critics, on Rotten Tomatoes, the show has a 57% based on 7 reviews and a Metacritic score of 63 out of 100 based on 5 critics, indicating "generally favorable reviews".

Neil Genzlinger of The New York Times wrote "There's no describing how hysterical this is; you have to see it." Diane Werts of Newsday wrote "Is there anything great here? No. Is it goofy fun? Yes. BOTTOM LINE Silly fun in the summertime." Brian Lowry of Variety wrote "If imitation is the sincerest form of flattery (and television), those responsible for Whose Line Is It Anyway? should be positively red-faced watching Riot, Fox's amped-up, exhausting new improv show. Lowry expanded that even with the creativity and comedy of the various skits, the show's "stunt-enhanced physical gags" do not quite merit the name "Riot". Neil Drumming of Salon said the "premiere felt like harmless summer programming, though a bit manic for my tastes."

== Release ==
Shine America's parent company represents the format internationally, and apart from the Australian and French versions, local-language versions of the show have screened in Thailand, Finland, Portugal, Denmark, Spain, Brazil, Ukraine, Romania and Vietnam.

=== Cancellation ===
After just four weeks, Fox pulled Riot from its Tuesday night schedule due to extremely poor ratings. The show's initial ratings and viewer response was mixed, debuting mid-May with a 0.5 rating in the 18–49 demographic with 1.34 million viewers, and for episodes 3 and 4, Riot drew a 0.4 rating in the same demographic. Fox stated they would eventually find a better time-slot for the show, and will fill the Tuesday slot with re-runs of more popular shows.

== International versions ==
The international rights are produced by Satisfaction – The Television Agency and distributed by Endemol Shine Group.

Country	Title	Presenter	Broadcaster	Premiere	Finale
France (original version)	Vendredi, tout est permis avec Arthur (VTEP) ("On Fridays, Anything Goes with Arthur", aka Anything Goes)	Arthur	TF1	December 16, 2011	present
Algeria	Vendredi ماشي عادي avec Sofiane; Vendredi Machi Adi (Ce n'est pas normal); Vendredi Machi 3adi	Sofiane Dani	Echorouk TV (2017–2019); Numidia TV (2019–present)	March 4, 2017	present
Germany	Jetzt wird's schräg	Jochen Schropp	Sat.1	July 18, 2014	present
Czechia	Možné je všechno!	Pavel Zedníček	TV Nova	August 31, 2024	present
Australia	SlideShow	Grant Denyer	Seven Network	August 7, 2013	November 13, 2013
Bulgaria	С Рачков всичко е възможно S Rachkov vsichko e vazmozhno	Dimitar Rachkov	NOVA	September 10, 2022	present
Canada (French)	Ce soir tout est permis	Éric Salvail	V	November 17, 2014	May 6, 2016
Colombia	Me caigo de la risa	Jorge Enrique Abello	RCN Televisión	March 5, 2016	May 28, 2016
Denmark	Rundt på gulvet	Lars Hjortshøj	TV 2	August 31, 2013	September 7, 2013
Spain	Me resbala	Arturo Valls	Antena 3	November 15, 2013	August 18, 2021
Spain	Me resbala	Lara Álvarez	Telecinco	June 27, 2023	August 22, 2023
Spain	Me resbala	Yolanda Ramos	La 1	2026	TBA
USA	Riot	Rove McManus	Fox	May 13, 2014	June 10, 2014
Indonesia	Slide Show	Raffi Ahmad	Trans TV	February 10, 2014	September 12, 2014
Israel	הכל הולך; Hakol Holekh; VTEP Israel	Dvir Benedek	Channel 2 (2014–2017); Reshet 13 (2017–present)	November 7, 2014	present
Italy	Stasera tutto è possibile	Amadeus (2015-2018); Stefano De Martino (2019–present)	Rai 2	September 8, 2015	present
Lebanon	الليلة جنون; Eleylé Jnoun; Layle Jnoun; Laylé Jnoun	Mario Bassil	MTV Lebanon	November 8, 2013	present
Mexico	Me caigo de risa	Faisy	Televisa	March 4, 2014	present
Netherlands	Alles mag op ...	Jandino Asporaat	RTL 4	April 20, 2014	February 19, 2017
Norway	Alt er lov	Solveig Kloppen	TV2	February 28, 2015	May 14, 2016
Poland	Anything Goes. Ale jazda!	Elżbieta Romanowska	TVP2	September 11, 2020	present
Portugal	Vale Tudo	João Manzarra	SIC	January 13, 2013	present
Romania	Totul e permis	Cosmin Seleși	Antena 1	January 5, 2014	February 11, 2014
Romania	Săriți de pe fix!	Cabral Ibacka	Pro TV	September 14, 2023	present
Russia	Возможно всё! Vozmozhno vso!	Vladimir Markony	Rossiya-1	February 4, 2022	present
Slovakia	Možné je všetko	Daniel Dangl	Markiza	September 2, 2023	present
Slovenia	Vse je mogoče	Marjan Kučej; Bojan Emeršič	TV SLO 1	October 4, 2015	present
Tunisia	نهار الأحد ما يهمك في حد; Nhar Lahad Ma Yhemk Fi Had	Sami Fehri; Nidhal Saadi; Amine Gara (March 22, 2020); Aymen Ammar; Wassim Migalo	Elhiwar Ettounsi	September 24, 2017	June 26, 2022
Tunisia	100 Façons	Amine Gara	Attessia TV	October 26, 2016	May 26, 2017
Thailand	เกมตลกหกคะเมน; Game Talok Hokkhamen	Kiattisak Udomnak	Thairath TV	October 3, 2015	January 30, 2016
Turkey	Dur Durabilirsen	Engin Hepiler	ATV	May 30, 2014	July 6, 2014
Uruguay	Me resbala	Rafael Villanueva	Teledoce	February 4, 2015	July 4, 2015
Vietnam	Chết Cười	Đức Hải	VTV3	January 17, 2015	April 25, 2015
Peru	Me caigo de risa	José Peláez	Latina Televisión	June 1, 2026	present
