= List of programs previously broadcast by the American Broadcasting Company =

This is a list of television programs once broadcast by the American television network ABC that have ended their runs on the network.

== Drama ==
Title	Premiere date	Finale	Notes	Seasons
Stand By for Crime	January 11, 1949	August 27, 1949		1
The Lone Ranger	September 15, 1949	June 6, 1957		5
Tales of Tomorrow	August 3, 1951	June 12, 1953		2
Crime with Father	August 31, 1951	January 18, 1952		1
Lash of the West	January 4, 1953	April 26, 1953		1
Davy Crockett	December 15, 1954	December 14, 1955	Miniseries	1
Kings Row	September 13, 1955	January 17, 1956		1
Cheyenne	September 20, 1955	December 17, 1962		7
Casablanca	September 27, 1955	April 24, 1956		1
G.E. Summer Originals	July 3, 1956	September 18, 1956		1
Conflict	September 18, 1956	September 3, 1957		2
Sugarfoot	September 17, 1957	April 17, 1961		4
Maverick	September 22, 1957	April 22, 1962		5
Zorro	October 10, 1957	July 2, 1959		2
Colt .45	October 18, 1957	September 27, 1960		3
Bronco	September 23, 1958	April 30, 1962		4
The Rifleman	September 30, 1958	April 8, 1963		5
Naked City	September 30, 1958	May 29, 1963		4
Lawman	October 5, 1958	June 24, 1962		4
77 Sunset Strip	October 10, 1958	February 7, 1964		6
The Alaskans	October 4, 1959	June 19, 1960		1
The Rebel	October 4, 1959	June 18, 1961		2
Adventures in Paradise	October 5, 1959	April 1, 1962		3
Bourbon Street Beat	October 5, 1959	July 4, 1960		1
Hawaiian Eye	October 7, 1959	April 2, 1963		4
The Untouchables	October 15, 1959	May 21, 1963		4
Hong Kong	September 28, 1960	March 29, 1961		1
Peter Gunn	October 3, 1960	September 18, 1961	Season 3 only Seasons 1–2 aired on to NBC	1
Stagecoach West	October 4, 1960	June 27, 1961		1
Surfside 6	October 6, 1960	June 25, 1962		2
The Roaring 20's	October 15, 1960	January 20, 1962		2
The Asphalt Jungle	April 2, 1961	June 25, 1961		1
Follow the Sun	September 17, 1961	April 8, 1962		1
Bus Stop	October 1, 1961	March 25, 1962		1
Ben Casey	October 2, 1961	March 21, 1966		5
The New Breed	October 3, 1961	June 5, 1962		1
Straightaway	October 6, 1961	April 4, 1962		1
Wagon Train	September 19, 1962	May 2, 1965	Seasons 6–8 only Seasons 1–5 aired on NBC	3
Combat!	October 2, 1962	March 14, 1967		5
The Gallant Men	October 5, 1962	March 30, 1963		1
The Dakotas	January 7, 1963	May 13, 1963		1
The Outer Limits	September 16, 1963	January 16, 1965		2
The Fugitive	September 17, 1963	August 29, 1967		4
Burke's Law	September 20, 1963	January 12, 1966		3
Voyage to the Bottom of the Sea	September 14, 1964	March 31, 1968		4
Peyton Place	September 15, 1964	June 2, 1969		5
12 O'Clock High	September 18, 1964	January 13, 1967		3
The Legend of Jesse James	September 13, 1965	May 9, 1966		1
A Man Called Shenandoah	September 13, 1965	May 16, 1966		1
The Big Valley	September 15, 1965	May 19, 1969		4
Honey West	September 17, 1965	April 8, 1966		1
The F.B.I.	September 19, 1965	April 28, 1974		9
Court Martial	January 8, 1966	September 2, 1966		1
Batman	January 12, 1966	March 14, 1968		3
Blue Light	January 12, 1966	May 18, 1966		1
Preview Tonight	August 14, 1966	September 11, 1966		1
The Monroes	September 7, 1966	March 15, 1967		1
The Green Hornet	September 9, 1966	March 17, 1967		1
The Time Tunnel	September 9, 1966	April 7, 1967		1
The Felony Squad	September 12, 1966	January 31, 1969		3
Iron Horse	September 12, 1966	January 6, 1968		2
The Rat Patrol	September 12, 1966	March 18, 1968		2
The Avengers	October 2, 1966	April 21, 1969	Seasons 4–6 only Seasons 1–3 aired on ITV	3
The Invaders	January 10, 1967	March 26, 1968		2
N.Y.P.D.	September 5, 1967	March 25, 1969		2
Garrison's Gorillas	September 5, 1967	March 12, 1968		1
Custer	September 6, 1967	December 27, 1967		1
Judd, for the Defense	September 8, 1967	March 21, 1969		2
The Guns of Will Sonnett	September 8, 1967	September 16, 1969		2
It Takes a Thief	January 9, 1968	March 24, 1970		3
Land of the Giants	September 22, 1968	March 22, 1970		2
The Outcasts	September 23, 1968	May 5, 1969		1
The Mod Squad	September 24, 1968	March 1, 1973		5
Room 222	September 11, 1969	January 11, 1974		5
Marcus Welby, M.D.	September 23, 1969	July 29, 1976		7
The Young Rebels	September 20, 1970	January 3, 1971		1
The Young Lawyers	September 21, 1970	March 24, 1971		1
Dan August	September 23, 1970	April 8, 1971		1
The Immortal	September 24, 1970	January 14, 1971		1
Matt Lincoln	September 24, 1970	January 14, 1971		1
The Most Deadly Game	October 10, 1970	January 16, 1971		1
Alias Smith and Jones	January 5, 1971	January 13, 1973		3
Owen Marshall, Counselor at Law	September 16, 1971	August 24, 1974		3
The Persuaders!	September 18, 1971	February 9, 1972		1
The Sixth Sense	January 15, 1972	December 23, 1972		2
The Rookies	March 7, 1972	March 30, 1976		4
The Streets of San Francisco	September 16, 1972	June 9, 1977		5
Kung Fu	October 14, 1972	April 26, 1975		3
The Strauss Family	November 7, 1972	December 19, 1972		1
Toma	March 21, 1973	May 10, 1974		1
Griff	September 29, 1973	January 4, 1974		1
Doc Elliot	October 10, 1973	May 1, 1974		1
Chopper One	January 17, 1974	April 11, 1974		1
Firehouse	January 17, 1974	April 11, 1974		1
The Six Million Dollar Man	January 18, 1974	March 6, 1978		5
Get Christie Love!	January 22, 1974	April 5, 1975		1
The Cowboys	February 6, 1974	June 27, 1974		1
QB VII	April 29, 1974	April 30, 1974	Miniseries	1
Kolchak: The Night Stalker	September 13, 1974	March 28, 1975		1
Nakia	September 21, 1974	December 28, 1974		1
Baretta	January 17, 1975	May 18, 1978		4
Caribe	February 17, 1975	May 12, 1975		1
S.W.A.T.	February 24, 1975	April 3, 1976		2
Starsky & Hutch	April 30, 1975	May 15, 1979		4
Barbary Coast	May 4, 1975	January 9, 1976		1
Mobile One	September 12, 1975	January 5, 1976		1
The Swiss Family Robinson	September 14, 1975	April 11, 1976		1
Matt Helm	September 20, 1975	January 3, 1976		1
Wonder Woman	November 7, 1975	February 16, 1977	Season 1 only Moved to CBS for seasons 2–3	1
Eleanor and Franklin	January 11, 1976	January 12, 1976	Miniseries	1
The Bionic Woman	January 14, 1976	May 4, 1977	Seasons 1–2 only Moved to NBC for season 3	2
How the West Was Won	January 19, 1976	April 23, 1979		3
Rich Man, Poor Man	February 1, 1976	March 15, 1976	Miniseries	1
Bert D'Angelo/Superstar	February 21, 1976	July 10, 1976		1
Family	March 9, 1976	June 25, 1980		5
Rich Man, Poor Man Book II	September 21, 1976	March 8, 1977	Miniseries	1
Charlie's Angels (1976)	September 22, 1976	June 24, 1981		5
Most Wanted	October 16, 1976	August 20, 1977		1
The Feather & Father Gang	December 6, 1976	July 30, 1977		1
Fantasy Island (1977)	January 14, 1977	May 19, 1984		7
Roots	January 23, 1977	January 30, 1977	Miniseries	1
The Hardy Boys/Nancy Drew Mysteries	January 30, 1977	January 14, 1979		3
Eight Is Enough	March 15, 1977	May 23, 1981		5
Washington: Behind Closed Doors	September 6, 1977	September 11, 1977	Miniseries	1
Lucan	September 12, 1977	December 4, 1978		2
The Love Boat	September 24, 1977	May 24, 1986		9
Doctors' Private Lives	March 20, 1978	April 26, 1978	Miniseries	1
The Young Pioneers	April 2, 1978	April 16, 1978	Miniseries	1
Battlestar Galactica	September 17, 1978	April 29, 1979		1
Vegas	September 20, 1978	June 3, 1981		3
Pearl	November 16, 1978	November 19, 1978	Miniseries	1
The Pirate	November 21, 1978	November 22, 1978	Miniseries	1
Roots: The Next Generations	February 18, 1979	February 24, 1979	Miniseries	1
Hart to Hart	August 25, 1979	May 22, 1984		5
240-Robert	August 28, 1979	March 21, 1981		2
B.A.D. Cats	January 4, 1980	November 15, 1980		1
Stone	January 14, 1980	March 17, 1980		1
Galactica 1980	January 27, 1980	May 4, 1980		1
Tenspeed and Brown Shoe	January 27, 1980	June 27, 1980		1
Dynasty	January 12, 1981	May 11, 1989		9
East of Eden	February 8, 1981	February 11, 1981	Miniseries	1
The Greatest American Hero	March 18, 1981	February 3, 1983		3
Strike Force	April 2, 1981	May 21, 1982		1
Masada	April 5, 1981	April 8, 1981	Miniseries	1
Manions of America	September 30, 1981	October 2, 1981	Miniseries	1
Today's FBI	October 25, 1981	April 26, 1982		1
Code Red	November 1, 1981	September 12, 1982		1
The Fall Guy	November 4, 1981	May 2, 1986		5
Darkroom	November 27, 1981	January 15, 1982		1
King's Crossing	January 16, 1982	February 27, 1982		1
T. J. Hooker	March 13, 1982	May 4, 1985	Seasons 1–4 only Moved to CBS for season 5	4
The Phoenix	March 19, 1982	April 16, 1982		1
Tales of the Gold Monkey	September 22, 1982	June 1, 1983		1
Matt Houston	September 26, 1982	July 19, 1985		3
The Quest	October 22, 1982	November 19, 1982		1
The Winds of War	February 6, 1983	February 13, 1983	Miniseries	1
The Renegades	March 4, 1983	April 8, 1983		1
The Thorn Birds	March 27, 1983	March 30, 1983	Miniseries	1
Lottery!	September 9, 1983	June 14, 1984		1
Hardcastle and McCormick	September 18, 1983	May 5, 1986		3
Hotel	September 21, 1983	May 5, 1988		5
Trauma Center	September 22, 1983	December 8, 1983		1
Kennedy	November 20, 1983	November 23, 1983	Miniseries	1
Automan	December 15, 1983	April 2, 1984		1
Masquerade	December 15, 1983	April 27, 1984		1
Blue Thunder	January 6, 1984	April 16, 1984		1
Lace	February 26, 1984	February 27, 1984	Miniseries	1
The Last Days of Pompeii	May 6, 1984	May 8, 1984	Miniseries	1
Call to Glory	August 13, 1984	June 30, 1985		1
Glitter	September 13, 1984	December 25, 1984		1
Hawaiian Heat	September 14, 1984	December 21, 1984		1
Finder of Lost Loves	September 22, 1984	April 13, 1985		1
Paper Dolls	September 23, 1984	December 25, 1984		1
MacGruder and Loud	January 20, 1985	April 30, 1985		1
Hollywood Wives	February 17, 1985	February 19, 1985	Miniseries	1
Moonlighting	March 3, 1985	May 14, 1989		5
Wildside	March 21, 1985	April 25, 1985		1
Lady Blue	April 15, 1985	January 25, 1986		1
Me and Mom	April 15, 1985	May 17, 1985		1
Our Family Honor	September 17, 1985	January 3, 1986		1
Spenser: For Hire	September 20, 1985	May 7, 1988		3
Hollywood Beat	September 21, 1985	November 23, 1985		1
The Insiders	September 25, 1985	June 2, 1986		1
MacGyver	September 29, 1985	May 21, 1992		7
North and South	November 3, 1985	March 2, 1994	Trilogy of miniseries	3
Shadow Chasers	November 14, 1985	January 16, 1986		1
The Colbys	November 20, 1985	March 26, 1987		2
Jack and Mike	September 16, 1986	March 24, 1987		1
Starman	September 19, 1986	May 2, 1987		1
Heart of the City	September 20, 1986	January 10, 1987		1
Sidekicks	September 26, 1986	June 13, 1987		1
Ohara	January 17, 1987	May 7, 1988		2
Amerika	February 15, 1987	February 22, 1987	Miniseries	1
Max Headroom	March 31, 1987	May 5, 1988		2
Queenie	May 10, 1987	May 11, 1987	Miniseries	1
Once a Hero	September 19, 1987	October 3, 1987		1
Hooperman	September 23, 1987	July 19, 1989		2
Buck James	September 27, 1987	May 5, 1988		1
Thirtysomething	September 29, 1987	May 28, 1991		4
Sable	November 7, 1987	January 2, 1988		1
Napoleon and Josephine: A Love Story	November 10, 1987	November 12, 1987	Miniseries	1
Supercarrier	March 6, 1988	May 14, 1988		1
Probe	March 7, 1988	April 14, 1988		1
China Beach	April 27, 1988	July 22, 1991		4
Hothouse	June 30, 1988	August 25, 1988		1
Mission: Impossible	October 23, 1988	February 24, 1990		2
Murphy's Law	November 2, 1988	March 18, 1989		1
Knightwatch	November 10, 1988	January 19, 1989		1
War and Remembrance	November 13, 1988	May 14, 1989	Miniseries	1
A Fine Romance	January 18, 1989	March 2, 1989		1
Studio 5-B	January 24, 1989	February 5, 1989		1
Columbo	February 6, 1989	January 30, 2003	Seasons 8–10 only Seasons 1–7 aired on NBC	3
B.L. Stryker	February 13, 1989	May 5, 1990		1
Life Goes On	September 12, 1989	May 23, 1993		4
Doogie Howser, M.D.	September 19, 1989	March 24, 1993		4
The Young Riders	September 20, 1989	July 23, 1992		3
Father Dowling Mysteries	January 4, 1990	May 2, 1991	Seasons 2–3 only Season 1 aired on NBC	2
Elvis	February 6, 1990	May 19, 1990		1
The Kennedys of Massachusetts	February 18, 1990	February 21, 1990	Miniseries	1
Equal Justice	March 27, 1990	July 3, 1991		2
Twin Peaks	April 8, 1990	June 10, 1991	Seasons 1–2 only Moved to Showtime for season 3	2
Capital News	April 9, 1990	April 30, 1990		1
Gabriel's Fire	September 12, 1990	June 6, 1991		1
Cop Rock	September 26, 1990	December 26, 1990		1
It	November 18, 1990	November 20, 1990	Miniseries	1
Under Cover	January 7, 1991	July 20, 1991		1
Son of the Morning Star	February 3, 1991	February 4, 1991	Miniseries	1
My Life and Times	April 24, 1991	May 30, 1991		1
Homefront	September 24, 1991	April 26, 1993		2
FBI: The Untold Stories	September 26, 1991	June 1, 1993		2
Pros and Cons	September 26, 1991	January 2, 1992		1
The Commish	September 28, 1991	January 11, 1996		5
Dynasty: The Reunion	October 20, 1991	October 22, 1991	Miniseries	1
Civil Wars	November 20, 1991	March 2, 1993		2
The Young Indiana Jones Chronicles	March 4, 1992	July 24, 1993		2
Jack's Place	May 26, 1992	July 13, 1993		2
Human Target	July 20, 1992	August 29, 1992		1
Covington Cross	August 25, 1992	October 31, 1992		1
Going to Extremes	September 1, 1992	January 27, 1993		1
Crossroads	September 14, 1992	July 15, 1993		1
Matlock	November 5, 1992	May 7, 1995	Seasons 7–9 only Seasons 1–6 aired on NBC	3
The Jacksons: An American Dream	November 15, 1992	November 18, 1992	Miniseries	1
The Tommyknockers	May 9, 1993	May 10, 1993	Miniseries	1
Wild Palms	May 16, 1993	May 19, 1993	Miniseries	1
Missing Persons	August 30, 1993	February 17, 1994		1
Lois & Clark: The New Adventures of Superman	September 12, 1993	June 14, 1997		4
Moon Over Miami	September 15, 1993	December 1, 1993		1
NYPD Blue	September 21, 1993	March 1, 2005		12
Birdland	January 5, 1994	April 21, 1994		1
The Byrds of Paradise	March 3, 1994	June 23, 1994		1
The Stand	May 8, 1994	May 12, 1994	Miniseries	1
My So-Called Life	August 25, 1994	January 26, 1995		1
McKenna	September 15, 1994	July 20, 1995		1
James A. Michener's Texas	April 16, 1995	April 18, 1995	Miniseries	1
The Langoliers	May 14, 1995	May 15, 1995	Miniseries	1
Charlie Grace	September 14, 1995	November 9, 1995		1
Murder One	September 19, 1995	May 29, 1997		2
Second Noah	February 5, 1996	June 8, 1997		2
High Incident	March 4, 1996	May 8, 1997		2
Dead Man's Walk	May 12, 1996	May 13, 1996	Miniseries	1
Bone Chillers	September 7, 1996	December 7, 1996		1
Relativity	September 24, 1996	April 14, 1997		1
Dangerous Minds	September 30, 1996	March 15, 1997		1
Spy Game	March 3, 1997	July 12, 1997		1
The Practice	March 4, 1997	May 16, 2004		8
Gun	April 12, 1997	May 31, 1997		1
The Shining	April 27, 1997	May 1, 1997	Miniseries	1
20,000 Leagues Under the Sea	May 11, 1997	May 12, 1997	Miniseries	1
Cracker	September 18, 1997	January 24, 1998		1
Nothing Sacred	September 18, 1997	March 14, 1998		1
Timecop	September 22, 1997	July 18, 1998		1
C-16: FBI	September 27, 1997	July 2, 1998		1
Total Security	September 27, 1997	November 8, 1997		1
Creature	May 17, 1998	May 18, 1998	Miniseries	1
Cupid (1998)	September 26, 1998	February 11, 1999		1
Fantasy Island (1998)	September 26, 1998	January 23, 1999		1
Vengeance Unlimited	September 29, 1998	February 25, 1999		1
Storm of the Century	February 14, 1999	February 18, 1999	Miniseries	1
Strange World	March 8, 1999	March 16, 1999		1
Mr. Murder	April 26, 1999	April 29, 1999	Miniseries	1
Once and Again	September 21, 1999	April 15, 2002		3
Snoops	September 26, 1999	December 19, 1999		1
Wasteland	October 7, 1999	October 21, 1999		1
Wonderland	March 30, 2000	April 6, 2000		1
Gideon's Crossing	October 10, 2000	April 16, 2001		1
Anne Frank: The Whole Story	May 20, 2001	May 21, 2001	Miniseries	1
Philly	September 25, 2001	May 28, 2002		1
Alias	September 30, 2001	May 22, 2006		5
Rose Red	January 27, 2002	January 29, 2002	Miniseries	1
The Court	March 26, 2002	April 9, 2002		1
Dinotopia	May 12, 2002	May 14, 2002	Miniseries	1
Push, Nevada	September 17, 2002	October 24, 2002		1
MDs	September 25, 2002	December 11, 2002		1
That Was Then	September 27, 2002	October 4, 2002		1
Miracles	January 27, 2003	December 26, 2003		1
Veritas: The Quest	January 27, 2003	June 24, 2003		1
L.A. Dragnet	February 2, 2003	May 5, 2004		2
Threat Matrix	September 18, 2003	January 29, 2004		1
Karen Sisco	October 1, 2003	December 3, 2003		1
Line of Fire	December 2, 2003	May 30, 2004		1
Kingdom Hospital	March 3, 2004	July 15, 2004		1
The Days	July 18, 2004	August 22, 2004		1
Lost	September 22, 2004	May 23, 2010		6
Boston Legal	October 3, 2004	December 8, 2008		5
Desperate Housewives	October 3, 2004	May 13, 2012		8
Life as We Know It	October 7, 2004	January 20, 2005		1
Blind Justice	March 8, 2005	June 21, 2005		1
Little House on the Prairie	March 26, 2005	April 23, 2005	Miniseries	1
Eyes	March 30, 2005	April 27, 2005		1
Invasion	September 21, 2005	May 17, 2006		1
Commander in Chief	September 27, 2005	June 14, 2006		1
Night Stalker	September 29, 2005	March 17, 2006		1
In Justice	January 1, 2006	March 31, 2006		1
The Evidence	March 22, 2006	July 1, 2006		1
What About Brian	April 16, 2006	March 29, 2007		2
Men in Trees	September 12, 2006	June 11, 2008		2
Six Degrees	September 21, 2006	March 30, 2007	The first eight episodes only The remaining five episodes were released on ABC.com	1
Brothers & Sisters	September 24, 2006	May 8, 2011		5
Ugly Betty	September 28, 2006	April 14, 2010		4
The Nine	October 4, 2006	August 8, 2007		1
Day Break	November 15, 2006	December 13, 2006		1
October Road	March 15, 2007	March 10, 2008		2
Traveler	May 10, 2007	July 18, 2007		1
Masters of Science Fiction	August 4, 2007	August 25, 2007		1
Dirty Sexy Money	September 26, 2007	August 8, 2009		2
Private Practice	September 26, 2007	January 22, 2013		6
Big Shots	September 27, 2007	January 24, 2008		1
Pushing Daisies	October 3, 2007	June 13, 2009		2
Women's Murder Club	October 12, 2007	May 13, 2008		1
Cashmere Mafia	January 6, 2008	February 20, 2008		1
Eli Stone	January 31, 2008	July 11, 2009		2
Life on Mars	October 9, 2008	April 1, 2009		1
Castle	March 9, 2009	May 16, 2016		8
Cupid (2009)	March 31, 2009	June 16, 2009		1
The Unusuals	April 8, 2009	June 17, 2009		1
Defying Gravity	August 2, 2009	October 23, 2009		1
The Forgotten	September 22, 2009	July 3, 2010		1
Eastwick	September 23, 2009	December 30, 2009		1
FlashForward	September 24, 2009	May 27, 2010		1
V	November 3, 2009	March 15, 2011		2
The Deep End	January 21, 2010	February 25, 2010		1
Happy Town	April 28, 2010	July 1, 2010	The first six episodes only The remaining two episodes were released on ABC.com	1
The Gates	June 20, 2010	September 19, 2010		1
Scoundrels	June 20, 2010	August 15, 2010		1
Rookie Blue	June 24, 2010	July 29, 2015	Co-production with Global	6
Detroit 1-8-7	September 21, 2010	March 20, 2011		1
The Whole Truth	September 22, 2010	December 1, 2010		1
My Generation	September 23, 2010	September 30, 2010		1
No Ordinary Family	September 28, 2010	April 5, 2011		1
Off the Map	January 12, 2011	April 6, 2011		1
Body of Proof	March 29, 2011	May 28, 2013		3
Combat Hospital	June 21, 2011	September 6, 2011	Co-production with Global	1
Revenge	September 21, 2011	May 10, 2015		4
Charlie's Angels (2011)	September 22, 2011	November 10, 2011		1
Pan Am	September 25, 2011	February 19, 2012		1
Once Upon a Time	October 23, 2011	May 18, 2018		7
The River	February 7, 2012	March 20, 2012		1
GCB	March 4, 2012	May 6, 2012		1
Missing	March 15, 2012	May 17, 2012		1
Scandal	April 5, 2012	April 19, 2018		7
Last Resort	September 27, 2012	January 24, 2013		1
666 Park Avenue	September 30, 2012	July 13, 2013		1
Nashville	October 10, 2012	May 25, 2016	Seasons 1–4 only Moved to CMT for seasons 5–6	4
Motive	February 3, 2013	May 29, 2014	Seasons 1–2 only Moved to USA Network for seasons 3–4	2
Zero Hour	February 14, 2013	August 3, 2013		1
Red Widow	March 3, 2013	May 5, 2013		1
Mistresses	June 3, 2013	September 6, 2016		4
Agents of S.H.I.E.L.D.	September 24, 2013	August 12, 2020		7
Lucky 7	September 24, 2013	October 1, 2013		1
Betrayal	September 29, 2013	January 19, 2014		1
Once Upon a Time in Wonderland	October 10, 2013	April 3, 2014		1
The Assets	January 2, 2014	August 3, 2014	Miniseries	1
Killer Women	January 7, 2014	March 25, 2014		1
Mind Games	February 25, 2014	March 25, 2014		1
Resurrection	March 9, 2014	January 25, 2015		2
Black Box	April 24, 2014	July 24, 2014		1
Forever	September 22, 2014	May 5, 2015		1
How to Get Away with Murder	September 25, 2014	May 14, 2020		6
Agent Carter	January 6, 2015	March 1, 2016		2
Secrets and Lies	March 1, 2015	December 4, 2016		2
American Crime	March 5, 2015	April 30, 2017		3
The Whispers	June 1, 2015	August 31, 2015		1
The Astronaut Wives Club	June 18, 2015	August 20, 2015	Miniseries	1
Blood & Oil	September 27, 2015	December 13, 2015		1
Quantico	September 27, 2015	August 3, 2018		3
Wicked City	October 27, 2015	December 15, 2015		1
Madoff	February 3, 2016	February 4, 2016	Miniseries	1
The Family	March 3, 2016	May 15, 2016		1
Of Kings and Prophets	March 8, 2016	May 3, 2016		1
The Catch	March 24, 2016	May 11, 2017		2
Designated Survivor	September 21, 2016	May 16, 2018	Seasons 1–2 only Moved to Netflix for season 3	2
Notorious	September 22, 2016	December 8, 2016		1
Conviction	October 3, 2016	January 29, 2017		1
When We Rise	February 27, 2017	March 3, 2017	Miniseries	1
Time After Time	March 5, 2017	March 26, 2017		1
Still Star-Crossed	May 29, 2017	July 29, 2017		1
Somewhere Between	July 24, 2017	September 19, 2017		1
The Good Doctor	September 25, 2017	May 21, 2024		7
Inhumans	September 29, 2017	November 10, 2017		1
Ten Days in the Valley	October 1, 2017	January 6, 2018		1
Kevin (Probably) Saves the World	October 3, 2017	March 6, 2018		1
Deception	March 11, 2018	May 27, 2018		1
For the People	March 13, 2018	May 16, 2019		2
Station 19	March 22, 2018	May 30, 2024		7
The Crossing	April 2, 2018	June 9, 2018		1
Take Two	June 21, 2018	September 13, 2018		1
A Million Little Things	September 26, 2018	May 3, 2023		5
Whiskey Cavalier	February 24, 2019	May 22, 2019		1
The Fix	March 18, 2019	May 20, 2019		1
Grand Hotel	June 17, 2019	September 9, 2019		1
Reef Break	June 20, 2019	September 13, 2019	Co-production with M6	1
Emergence	September 24, 2019	January 28, 2020		1
Stumptown	September 25, 2019	March 25, 2020		1
For Life	February 11, 2020	February 24, 2021		2
The Baker and the Beauty	April 13, 2020	June 1, 2020		1
Big Sky	November 17, 2020	January 18, 2023		3
Rebel	April 8, 2021	June 10, 2021		1
Queens	October 19, 2021	February 15, 2022		1
Women of the Movement	January 6, 2022	January 20, 2022	Miniseries	1
Promised Land	January 24, 2022	March 29, 2022	The first five episodes only The remaining five episodes were released on Hulu	1
The Rookie: Feds	September 27, 2022	May 2, 2023		1
Alaska Daily	October 6, 2022	March 30, 2023		1
The Company You Keep	February 19, 2023	May 7, 2023		1
Doctor Odyssey	September 26, 2024	May 15, 2025		1

== Comedy ==
Title	Premiere date	Finale	Notes	Seasons
The Ruggles	October 23, 1949	June 19, 1952		4
The Beulah Show	October 3, 1950	September 22, 1953		3
The Adventures of Ozzie and Harriet	October 3, 1952	April 23, 1966		14
The Danny Thomas Show	September 29, 1953	April 25, 1957	Seasons 1–4 only Moved to CBS for seasons 5–11	4
Ethel and Albert	October 14, 1955	July 6, 1956	Season 4 only Seasons 1–2 aired on NBC and season 3 aired on CBS	1
The Real McCoys	October 3, 1957	May 10, 1962	Seasons 1–5 only Moved to CBS for season 6	5
Love That Jill	January 20, 1958	April 14, 1958		1
The Donna Reed Show	September 24, 1958	March 19, 1966		8
Leave It to Beaver	October 2, 1958	June 20, 1963	Seasons 2–6 only Season 1 aired on CBS	5
My Three Sons	September 29, 1960	May 20, 1965	Seasons 1–5 only Moved to CBS for seasons 6–12	5
Harrigan and Son	October 14, 1960	September 29, 1961		1
Bachelor Father	September 21, 1961	June 26, 1962	Season 5 only Seasons 1–2 aired on CBS and seasons 3–4 aired on NBC	1
Room for One More	January 27, 1962	July 28, 1962		1
I'm Dickens, He's Fenster	September 28, 1962	May 10, 1963		1
McHale's Navy	October 11, 1962	April 12, 1966		4
The Patty Duke Show	September 18, 1963	April 27, 1966		3
The Farmer's Daughter	September 20, 1963	April 22, 1966		3
No Time for Sergeants	September 14, 1964	May 3, 1965		1
Wendy and Me	September 14, 1964	May 24, 1965		1
Bewitched	September 17, 1964	March 25, 1972		8
The Addams Family	September 18, 1964	April 8, 1966		2
F Troop	September 14, 1965	April 6, 1967		2
Gidget	September 15, 1965	April 21, 1966		1
Tammy	September 17, 1965	March 11, 1966		1
Summer Fun	July 22, 1966	September 2, 1966		1
That Girl	September 8, 1966	March 19, 1971		5
Rango	January 13, 1967	May 5, 1967		1
The Second Hundred Years	September 6, 1967	March 28, 1968		1
The Flying Nun	September 7, 1967	April 3, 1970		3
Here Come the Brides	September 25, 1968	April 3, 1970		2
The Courtship of Eddie's Father	September 17, 1969	March 1, 1972		3
The Ghost & Mrs. Muir	September 18, 1969	March 13, 1970	Season 2 only Season 1 aired on NBC	1
The Brady Bunch	September 26, 1969	March 8, 1974		5
Love, American Style	September 29, 1969	January 11, 1974		5
Nanny and the Professor	January 21, 1970	December 27, 1971		3
Barefoot in the Park	September 24, 1970	December 17, 1970		1
The Odd Couple	September 24, 1970	March 7, 1975		5
The Partridge Family	September 25, 1970	March 23, 1974		4
The Smith Family	January 20, 1971	June 7, 1972		2
Getting Together	September 18, 1971	January 8, 1972		1
The Super	June 21, 1972	August 23, 1972		1
Temperatures Rising	September 12, 1972	August 29, 1974		2
The Paul Lynde Show	September 13, 1972	March 14, 1973		1
A Touch of Grace	January 20, 1973	April 21, 1973		1
Thicker than Water	June 13, 1973	August 8, 1973		1
When Things Were Rotten	September 10, 1975	December 3, 1975		1
Adam's Rib	September 14, 1973	December 28, 1973		1
Bob & Carol & Ted & Alice	September 26, 1973	November 7, 1973		1
Happy Days	January 15, 1974	July 19, 1984		11
Just for Laughs	August 8, 1974	August 29, 1974		1
That's My Mama	September 4, 1974	December 24, 1975		2
The Texas Wheelers	September 13, 1974	July 24, 1975		1
Barney Miller	January 23, 1975	May 20, 1982		8
Hot l Baltimore	January 24, 1975	April 25, 1975		1
Welcome Back, Kotter	September 9, 1975	May 17, 1979		4
On the Rocks	September 11, 1975	May 17, 1976		1
Laverne & Shirley	January 27, 1976	May 10, 1983		8
Good Heavens	February 29, 1976	June 26, 1976		1
Viva Valdez	May 31, 1976	September 6, 1976		1
What's Happening!!	August 5, 1976	April 28, 1979		3
The Tony Randall Show	September 23, 1976	March 10, 1977	Season 1 only Moved to CBS for season 2	1
Holmes & Yoyo	September 25, 1976	August 8, 1977		1
Mr. T and Tina	September 25, 1976	October 30, 1976		1
The Nancy Walker Show	September 30, 1976	December 23, 1976		1
Fish	February 5, 1977	May 18, 1978		2
Blansky's Beauties	February 12, 1977	June 27, 1977		1
Three's Company	March 14, 1977	September 18, 1984		8
Tabitha	September 10, 1977	January 14, 1978		1
Soap	September 13, 1977	April 20, 1981		4
Carter Country	September 15, 1977	August 23, 1979		2
Operation Petticoat	September 17, 1977	October 16, 1978		2
The San Pedro Beach Bums	September 19, 1977	December 19, 1977		1
A.E.S. Hudson Street	March 16, 1978	April 20, 1978		1
Taxi	September 12, 1978	May 6, 1982	Seasons 1–4 only Moved to NBC for season 5	4
Mork & Mindy	September 14, 1978	May 27, 1982		4
Apple Pie	September 23, 1978	September 30, 1978		1
Delta House	January 18, 1979	April 21, 1979		1
Makin' It	February 1, 1979	March 23, 1979		1
Angie	February 8, 1979	September 4, 1980		2
The Ropers	March 13, 1979	May 22, 1980		2
Detective School	July 31, 1979	November 24, 1979		2
Out of the Blue	September 9, 1979	December 16, 1979		1
Benson	September 13, 1979	April 19, 1986		7
A New Kind of Family	September 16, 1979	January 5, 1980		1
The Associates	September 23, 1979	April 17, 1980		1
Nobody's Perfect	June 26, 1980	August 28, 1980		1
It's a Living	October 30, 1980	June 11, 1982	Seasons 1–2 only Moved to first-run syndication for seasons 3–6	2
I'm a Big Girl Now	October 31, 1980	May 8, 1981		1
Too Close for Comfort	November 11, 1980	May 5, 1983	Seasons 1–3 only Moved to first-run syndication for seasons 4–6	3
Bosom Buddies	November 27, 1980	March 27, 1982		2
Aloha Paradise	February 25, 1981	April 22, 1981		1
Best of the West	September 10, 1981	August 23, 1982		1
Maggie	October 24, 1981	May 21, 1982		1
Open All Night	November 28, 1981	March 5, 1982		1
Police Squad!	March 4, 1982	July 8, 1982		1
Joanie Loves Chachi	March 23, 1982	May 24, 1983		2
9 to 5	March 25, 1982	October 27, 1983		3
Star of the Family	September 30, 1982	December 9, 1982		1
It Takes Two	October 14, 1982	April 28, 1983		1
The New Odd Couple	October 29, 1982	May 26, 1983		1
Amanda's	February 10, 1983	May 26, 1983		1
Condo	February 10, 1983	June 9, 1983		1
At Ease	March 4, 1983	June 10, 1983		1
Baby Makes Five	April 1, 1983	April 29, 1983		1
Reggie	August 2, 1983	September 1, 1983		1
Webster	September 16, 1983	May 8, 1987	Seasons 1–4 only Moved to first-run syndication for seasons 5–6	4
Just Our Luck	September 20, 1983	December 27, 1983		1
Oh Madeline	September 27, 1983	March 13, 1984		1
It's Not Easy	September 29, 1983	October 27, 1983		1
a.k.a. Pablo	March 6, 1984	April 10, 1984		1
Who's the Boss?	September 20, 1984	April 25, 1992		8
Three's a Crowd	September 25, 1984	April 9, 1985		1
Off the Rack	December 7, 1984	April 19, 1985		1
Mr. Belvedere	March 15, 1985	July 8, 1990		6
Hail to the Chief	April 9, 1985	May 21, 1985		1
Growing Pains	September 24, 1985	April 25, 1992		7
Diff'rent Strokes	September 27, 1985	March 7, 1986	Season 8 only Seasons 1–7 aired on NBC	1
He's the Mayor	January 10, 1986	March 21, 1986		1
Perfect Strangers	March 25, 1986	August 6, 1993		8
Mr. Sunshine (1986)	March 28, 1986	May 24, 1986		1
Head of the Class	September 17, 1986	June 25, 1991		5
The Ellen Burstyn Show	September 20, 1986	September 5, 1987		1
Life with Lucy	September 20, 1986	November 15, 1986		1
Sledge Hammer!	September 23, 1986	February 12, 1988		2
Dads	December 5, 1986	February 6, 1987		1
The Charmings	March 20, 1987	February 11, 1988		2
Full House	September 22, 1987	May 23, 1995		8
I Married Dora	September 22, 1987	January 8, 1988		1
The Slap Maxwell Story	September 23, 1987	June 8, 1988		1
The Wonder Years (1988)	January 31, 1988	May 12, 1993		6
Family Man	March 18, 1988	April 29, 1988		1
Just in Time	April 6, 1988	May 11, 1988		1
Just the Ten of Us	April 26, 1988	May 4, 1990		3
Roseanne	October 18, 1988	May 22, 2018		10
Coach	February 28, 1989	May 14, 1997		9
Anything but Love	March 7, 1989	June 3, 1992		4
The Robert Guillaume Show	April 5, 1989	August 1, 1989		1
Have Faith	April 18, 1989	June 13, 1989		1
Chicken Soup	September 12, 1989	November 7, 1989		1
Homeroom	September 16, 1989	December 17, 1989		1
Family Matters	September 22, 1989	May 9, 1997	Seasons 1–8 only Moved to CBS for season 9	8
Free Spirit	September 22, 1989	January 14, 1990		1
Living Dolls	September 26, 1989	December 30, 1989		1
Married People	September 18, 1990	March 16, 1991		1
Going Places	September 21, 1990	March 8, 1991		1
Davis Rules	January 27, 1991	April 9, 1991	Season 1 only Moved to CBS for season 2	1
Baby Talk	March 8, 1991	May 8, 1992		2
Stat	April 16, 1991	May 21, 1991		1
My Life and Times	April 24, 1991	May 30, 1991		1
Dinosaurs	April 26, 1991	October 19, 1994		4
Hi Honey, I'm Home!	July 19, 1991	August 23, 1991	Season 1 only Moved to Nick at Nite for season 2	1
Home Improvement	September 17, 1991	May 25, 1999		8
Sibs	September 17, 1991	April 29, 1992		1
Step by Step	September 20, 1991	August 15, 1997	Seasons 1–6 only Moved to CBS for season 7	6
Good & Evil	September 25, 1991	October 30, 1991		1
Billy	January 31, 1992	May 30, 1992		1
Room for Two	March 24, 1992	July 6, 1993		2
Julie	May 30, 1992	July 4, 1992		1
On the Air	June 20, 1992	July 4, 1992		1
Arresting Behavior	August 18, 1992	September 2, 1992		1
Delta	September 15, 1992	August 25, 1993		1
Camp Wilder	September 18, 1992	February 26, 1993		1
Hangin' with Mr. Cooper	September 22, 1992	August 30, 1997		5
Laurie Hill	September 30, 1992	October 28, 1992		1
The Jackie Thomas Show	December 1, 1992	April 30, 1993		1
Getting By	March 5, 1993	May 21, 1993	Season 1 only Moved to NBC for season 2	1
Where I Live	March 5, 1993	November 20, 1993		2
Home Free	March 31, 1993	July 2, 1993		1
Thea	September 8, 1993	February 16, 1994		1
Phenom	September 14, 1993	May 10, 1994		1
Boy Meets World	September 24, 1993	May 5, 2000		7
Grace Under Fire	September 29, 1993	February 17, 1998		5
George	November 5, 1993	January 19, 1994		1
Thunder Alley	March 9, 1994	July 4, 1995		2
Ellen	March 29, 1994	July 22, 1998		5
Sister, Sister	April 1, 1994	April 28, 1995	Seasons 1–2 only Moved to The WB for seasons 3–6	2
Blue Skies	September 12, 1994	October 24, 1994		1
On Our Own	September 13, 1994	April 14, 1995		1
Me and the Boys	September 20, 1994	February 28, 1995		1
A Whole New Ballgame	January 9, 1995	March 13, 1995		1
The Jeff Foxworthy Show	September 12, 1995	May 15, 1996	Season 1 only Moved to NBC for season 2	1
The Drew Carey Show	September 13, 1995	September 8, 2004		9
The Naked Truth	September 13, 1995	February 28, 1996	Season 1 only Moved to NBC for seasons 2–3	1
Maybe This Time	September 15, 1995	February 17, 1996		1
Hudson Street	September 19, 1995	June 19, 1996		1
Buddies	March 5, 1996	April 3, 1996		1
Life's Work	September 17, 1996	June 10, 1997		1
Spin City	September 17, 1996	April 30, 2002		6
Townies	September 18, 1996	December 4, 1996		1
Clueless	September 20, 1996	February 14, 1997	Season 1 only Moved to UPN for seasons 2–3	1
Sabrina the Teenage Witch	September 27, 1996	May 5, 2000	Seasons 1–4 only Moved to The WB for seasons 5–7	4
Common Law	September 28, 1996	October 19, 1996		1
Arsenio	March 5, 1997	April 23, 1997		1
Soul Man	April 15, 1997	May 26, 1998		2
Hiller and Diller	September 23, 1997	March 13, 1998		1
Dharma & Greg	September 24, 1997	April 30, 2002		5
Teen Angel	September 26, 1997	February 13, 1998		1
You Wish	September 26, 1997	July 24, 1998		1
Something So Right	March 3, 1998	July 7, 1998	Season 2 only Season 1 aired on NBC	1
Two Guys, a Girl, and a Pizza Place	March 10, 1998	May 16, 2001		4
The Hughleys	September 22, 1998	April 28, 2000	Seasons 1–2 only Moved to UPN for seasons 3–4	2
Sports Night	September 22, 1998	May 16, 2000		2
Brother's Keeper	September 25, 1998	May 14, 1999		1
Two of a Kind	September 25, 1998	July 9, 1999		1
The Secret Lives of Men	September 30, 1998	November 11, 1998		1
It's Like, You Know...	March 24, 1999	January 5, 2000		2
The Norm Show	March 24, 1999	April 6, 2001		3
Oh, Grow Up	September 22, 1999	December 28, 1999		1
Odd Man Out	September 24, 1999	January 7, 2000		1
Madigan Men	October 6, 2000	December 15, 2000		1
The Trouble with Normal	October 6, 2000	November 3, 2000		1
The Geena Davis Show	October 10, 2000	July 10, 2001		1
The Job	March 14, 2001	April 24, 2002		2
What About Joan?	March 27, 2001	October 9, 2001		2
My Wife and Kids	March 28, 2001	May 17, 2005		5
Bob Patterson	October 2, 2001	October 31, 2001		1
According to Jim	October 3, 2001	June 2, 2009		8
George Lopez	March 27, 2002	May 8, 2007		6
8 Simple Rules	September 17, 2002	April 15, 2005		3
Life with Bonnie	September 17, 2002	April 9, 2004		2
Less than Perfect	October 1, 2002	June 20, 2006		4
Regular Joe	March 28, 2003	April 18, 2003		1
I'm with Her	September 23, 2003	April 27, 2004		1
Hope & Faith	September 26, 2003	May 2, 2006		3
It's All Relative	October 1, 2003	April 20, 2004		1
Married to the Kellys	October 3, 2003	April 23, 2004		1
Rodney	September 21, 2004	June 6, 2006		2
Complete Savages	September 24, 2004	June 17, 2005		1
Jake in Progress	March 13, 2005	February 20, 2006		2
Hot Properties	October 7, 2005	December 30, 2005		1
Freddie	October 12, 2005	May 31, 2006		1
Emily's Reasons Why Not	January 9, 2006			1
Crumbs	January 12, 2006	February 7, 2006		1
Sons & Daughters	March 7, 2006	April 4, 2006		1
Help Me Help You	September 26, 2006	December 12, 2006		1
Big Day	November 28, 2006	January 30, 2007		1
In Case of Emergency	January 3, 2007	April 11, 2007		1
The Knights of Prosperity	January 3, 2007	August 8, 2007		1
Notes from the Underbelly	April 12, 2007	February 4, 2008		2
Carpoolers	October 2, 2007	March 4, 2008		1
Cavemen	October 2, 2007	November 13, 2007		1
Samantha Who?	October 15, 2007	July 23, 2009		2
Miss Guided	March 18, 2008	April 3, 2008		1
Scrubs	January 6, 2009	March 17, 2010	Seasons 8–9 only Seasons 1–7 aired on NBC	2
Better Off Ted	March 18, 2009	August 24, 2010		2
In the Motherhood	March 26, 2009	June 25, 2009		1
Surviving Suburbia	June 4, 2009	August 7, 2009		1
Cougar Town	September 23, 2009	May 29, 2012	Seasons 1–3 only Moved to TBS for seasons 4–6	3
Modern Family	September 23, 2009	April 8, 2020		11
Hank	September 30, 2009	November 4, 2009		1
The Middle	September 30, 2009	May 22, 2018		9
Romantically Challenged	April 19, 2010	May 17, 2010		1
Better with You	September 22, 2010	May 11, 2011		1
Mr. Sunshine (2011)	February 9, 2011	April 6, 2011		1
Happy Endings	April 13, 2011	May 3, 2013		3
Suburgatory	September 28, 2011	May 14, 2014		3
Last Man Standing	October 11, 2011	March 31, 2017	Seasons 1–6 only Moved to Fox for seasons 7–9	6
Man Up!	October 18, 2011	December 6, 2011		1
Work It	January 3, 2012	January 10, 2012		1
Don't Trust the B— in Apartment 23	April 11, 2012	September 6, 2014		2
The Neighbors	September 26, 2012	April 11, 2014		2
Malibu Country	November 2, 2012	March 22, 2013		1
How to Live with Your Parents (For the Rest of Your Life)	April 3, 2013	June 26, 2013		1
Family Tools	May 1, 2013	July 10, 2013		1
The Goldbergs	September 23, 2013	May 3, 2023		10
Trophy Wife	September 24, 2013	May 13, 2014		1
Back in the Game	September 25, 2013	February 23, 2014		1
Super Fun Night	October 2, 2013	February 19, 2014		1
Mixology	February 26, 2014	May 21, 2014		1
Black-ish	September 24, 2014	April 19, 2022		8
Manhattan Love Story	September 30, 2014	December 4, 2014	The first four episodes only The remaining seven episodes were released on Hulu	1
Selfie	September 30, 2014	November 11, 2014	The first seven episodes only The remaining six episodes were released on Hulu	1
Cristela	October 10, 2014	April 17, 2015		1
Galavant	January 4, 2015	January 31, 2016		2
Fresh Off the Boat	February 4, 2015	February 21, 2020		6
The Muppets	September 22, 2015	March 1, 2016		1
Dr. Ken	October 2, 2015	March 31, 2017		2
The Real O'Neals	March 2, 2016	March 14, 2017		2
Uncle Buck	June 14, 2016	August 2, 2016		1
Speechless	September 21, 2016	April 12, 2019		3
American Housewife	October 11, 2016	March 31, 2021		5
Downward Dog	May 17, 2017	June 27, 2017		1
The Mayor	October 3, 2017	December 12, 2017		1
Splitting Up Together	March 27, 2018	April 9, 2019		2
Alex, Inc.	March 28, 2018	May 16, 2018		1
Single Parents	September 26, 2018	May 13, 2020		2
The Conners	October 16, 2018	April 23, 2025		7
The Kids Are Alright	October 16, 2018	May 21, 2019		1
Schooled	January 9, 2019	May 13, 2020		2
Bless This Mess	April 16, 2019	May 5, 2020		2
Mixed-ish	September 24, 2019	May 18, 2021		2
United We Fall	July 15, 2020	August 26, 2020		1
Call Your Mother	January 13, 2021	May 19, 2021		1
Home Economics	April 7, 2021	January 18, 2023		3
The Wonder Years (2021)	September 22, 2021	August 16, 2023		2
Not Dead Yet	February 8, 2023	April 24, 2024		2

== Animation ==
=== Adult animation ===
- Capitol Critters (1992; moved to Cartoon Network)
- The Critic (1994; moved to Fox)
- Clerks: The Animated Series (2000; moved to Comedy Central)
- The Goode Family (2009)

=== Children's animation ===
- Matty's Funday Funnies (1959–1961)
- The Bugs Bunny Show (1960–1962)
- The Flintstones (1960–1966)
- Top Cat (1961–1962)
- Beany and Cecil (1962)
- The Jetsons (1962–1963)
- Jonny Quest (1964–1965)

== Unscripted ==
=== Docuseries ===
- Ripley's Believe It or Not (1982–1986)
- State V. (2002)
- 1969 (2019)
- The Last Dance (2020)
- The Con (2020–2022)
- Soul of a Nation (2021)
- Mike Tyson: The Knockout (2021)
- Superstar (2021–2023)
- Let the World See (2022)
- Who Do You Believe? (2022)
- The Fatal Flaw: A Special Edition of 20/20 (2022)
- The Game Show Show (2023)
- The Interrogation Tapes: A Special Edition of 20/20 (2024)
- Scamanda (2025)
- Dirty Talk: When Daytime Talk Shows Ruled TV (2026)

=== Game shows ===
- Fun and Fortune (1949)
- Who Do You Trust? (1957–1963)
- Beat the Clock (1958–1961; moved from CBS)
- Camouflage (1961–1962)
- Number Please (1961)
- Seven Keys (1961–1964)
- Yours for a Song (1961–1963)
- The Object Is (1963–1964)
- The Price Is Right (1963–1965)
- Get the Message (1964)
- Missing Links (1964)
- Shenanigans (1964–1965)
- The Dating Game (1965–1973)
- Supermarket Sweep (1965–1967; 2020–2022)
- The Newlywed Game (1966–1974; 1984)
- Everybody's Talking (1967)
- The Family Game (1967)
- The Honeymoon Race (1967)
- How's Your Mother-in-Law? (1967–1968)
- One in a Million (1967)
- Temptation (1967–1968)
- Dream House (1968–1970)
- Funny You Should Ask (1968–1969)
- Let's Make a Deal (1968–1976)
- Password (1971–1975; moved from CBS)
- The Reel Game (1971)
- Split Second (1972–1975)
- The Girl in My Life (1973–1974)
- The $10,000 Pyramid (1974–1976; moved from CBS)
- The $20,000 Pyramid (1976–1980)
- The Big Showdown (1974–1975)
- The Money Maze (1974–1975)
- Blankety Blanks (1975)
- The Neighbors (1975–1976)
- Rhyme and Reason (1975–1976)
- Showoffs (1975)
- You Don't Say! (1975)
- Break the Bank (1976)
- Family Feud (1976–1985; Celebrity edition aired in 2015; moved to first-run syndication)
- Hot Seat (1976)
- The Better Sex (1977–1978)
- Second Chance (1977)
- Trivia Trap (1984–1985)
- All-Star Blitz (1985)
- Bruce Forsyth's Hot Streak (1986)
- Bargain Hunters (1987)
- Monopoly (1990)
- You Don't Know Jack (2001)
- The Chair (2002)
- Master of Champions (2006)
- Show Me the Money (2006)
- Duel (2007–2008)
- National Bingo Night (2007)
- Set for Life (2007)
- Dance Machine (2008)
- I Survived a Japanese Game Show (2008–2009)
- Opportunity Knocks (2008)
- Wanna Bet? (2008)
- Wipeout (2008–2014; moved to TBS)
- Crash Course (2009)
- Downfall (2010)
- 101 Ways to Leave a Game Show (2011)
- Karaoke Battle USA (2011)
- You Deserve It (2011)
- Bet on Your Baby (2013–2014)
- 500 Questions (2015–2016)
- To Tell the Truth (2016–2022)
- Big Fan (2017)
- The Gong Show (2017–2018)
- Child Support (2018)
- Card Sharks (2019–2021)
- Jeopardy! The Greatest of All Time (2020)
- Don't (2020)
- The Hustler (2021)
- The Celebrity Dating Game (2021)
- Jeopardy! National College Championship (2022)
- Generation Gap (2022–2023)
- The Final Straw (2022)
- Lucky 13 (2024)

=== Reality ===
- Your Witness (1949–1950)
- Battle of the Network Stars (1976–1988; 2017)
- Those Amazing Animals (1980–1981)
- That's Incredible! (1980–1984)
- Fame, Fortune and Romance (1986–1987)
- Incredible Sunday (1988–1989)
- Tim Conway's Funny America (1990)
- America's Funniest People (1990–1994)
- Making the Band (2000–2001; moved to MTV)
- The Mole (2001–2004; 2008)
- Houston Medical (2002)
- Extreme Makeover (2002–2007)
- All-American Girl (2003)
- Are You Hot? (2003)
- I'm a Celebrity...Get Me Out of Here! (2003)
- The Family (2003)
- The Real Roseanne Show (2003)
- The Benefactor (2004)
- Wife Swap (2004–2010; 2013)
- Supernanny (2005–2011)
- The Scholar (2005)
- Brat Camp (2005)
- My Kind of Town (2005)
- Miracle Workers (2006)
- The One: Making a Music Star (2006)
- One Ocean View (2006)
- American Inventor (2006–2007)
- The Ex-Wives Club (2007)
- Fast Cars and Superstars: The Gillette Young Guns Celebrity Race (2007)
- Fat March (2007)
- The Great American Dream Vote (2007)
- The Next Best Thing (2007)
- Shaq's Big Challenge (2007)
- Just For Laughs (2007–2009)
- Dance War: Bruno vs. Carrie Ann (2008)
- High School Musical: Get in the Picture (2008)
- Hopkins (2008)
- Oprah's Big Give (2008)
- Here Come the Newlyweds (2008–2009)
- Find My Family (2009)
- Homeland Security USA (2009)
- The Superstars (2009)
- Dating in the Dark (2009–2010)
- Shaq Vs. (2009–2010)
- True Beauty (2009–2010)
- Bachelor Pad (2010–2012)
- Boston Med (2010)
- Jamie Oliver's Food Revolution (2010–2011)
- Skating with the Stars (2010)
- Expedition Impossible (2011)
- Take the Money & Run (2011)
- The Secret Millionaire (2011–2013)
- Extreme Weight Loss (2011–2015)
- Ball Boys (2012)
- Final Witness (2012)
- The Glass House (2012)
- Duets (2012)
- NY Med (2012–2014)
- Celebrity Wife Swap (2012–2015)
- Splash (2013)
- Whodunnit? (2013)
- The Taste (2013–2015)
- Rising Star (2014)
- Sing Your Face Off (2014)
- The Quest (2014; moved to Disney+)
- Repeat After Me (2015)
- Save My Life: Boston Trauma (2015)
- The Great American Baking Show (2015–2020)
- BattleBots (2015–2016)
- Beyond the Tank (2015–2016)
- Boston EMS (2015–2016)
- Greatest Hits (2016)
- My Diet Is Better Than Yours (2016)
- Boy Band (2017)
- People Icons (2017)
- Steve Harvey's Funderdome (2017)
- The Toy Box (2017)
- The Bachelor Winter Games (2018)
- The Last Defense (2018)
- The Proposal (2018)
- Castaways (2018)
- Dancing with the Stars: Juniors (2018)
- Videos After Dark (2019)
- Holey Moley (2019–2022)
- Family Food Fight (2019)
- Kids Say the Darndest Things (2019–2020; moved to CBS)
- The Bachelor Presents: Listen to Your Heart (2020)
- The Bachelor: The Greatest Seasons – Ever! (2020)
- Emergency Call (2020–2021)
- Pooch Perfect (2021)
- When Nature Calls with Helen Mirren (2021–2022)
- The Ultimate Surfer (2021)
- Judge Steve Harvey (2022–2024)
- Claim to Fame (2022–2024)
- The Parent Test (2022–2023)
- The Prank Panel (2023)
- The Golden Bachelorette (2024)

=== Variety ===
- Buzzy Wuzzy (1948)
- Showtime U.S.A. (1950–1951)
- The Grand Ole Opry (1955–1956)
- The Lawrence Welk Show (1955–1971)
- The Mickey Mouse Club (1955–1959)
- Ozark Jubilee (1955–1960)
- Talent Varieties (1955)
- The Eddy Arnold Show (1956)
- American Bandstand (1957–1987)
- The Frank Sinatra Show (1957–1958)
- Confession (1957–1959)
- The Steve Allen Show (1961)
- The Hollywood Palace (1964–1970)
- The King Family Show (1965–1966; 1969)
- Where the Action Is (1965–1967)
- The Joey Bishop Show (1967–1969)
- The Dick Cavett Show (1968–1975; 1986)
- The Johnny Cash Show (1969–1971)
- The Lennon Sisters Hour (1969–1970)
- This Is Tom Jones (1969–1971)
- Turn-On (1969)
- The Julie Andrews Hour (1972–1973)
- The Sonny Comedy Revue (1974)
- The Jim Stafford Show (1975)
- The Brady Bunch Hour (1976–1977)
- Captain & Tennille (1976–1977)
- Cos (1976)
- Donny & Marie (1976–1979)
- Fridays (1980–1982)
- Dolly (1987–1988)
- Home (1988–1994)
- Into The Night Starring Rick Dees (1990–1991)
- The Paula Poundstone Show (1993)
- Mike and Maty (1994–1996)
- Caryl & Marilyn: Real Friends (1996–1997)
- The Dana Carvey Show (1996)
- Muppets Tonight (1996)
- Politically Incorrect (1997–2002)
- Whose Line Is It Anyway? (1998–2004)
- Dot Comedy (2000)
- The Wayne Brady Show (2001–2002)
- Just for Laughs (2009–2011)
- The Chew (2011–2018)
- The Revolution (2012)
- Trust Us with Your Life (2012)
- Good Afternoon America (2012)
- Bachelor in Paradise: After Paradise (2015–2016)
- Bachelor Live (2016)
- The Alec Baldwin Show (2018)

== Soap operas ==
- The Young Marrieds (October 5, 1964 – March 25, 1966)
- A Flame in the Wind (December 28, 1964 – December 16, 1966)
- Never Too Young (September 27, 1965 – June 24, 1966)
- The Nurses (September 27, 1965 – March 21, 1967)
- Dark Shadows (June 27, 1966 – April 2, 1971)
- One Life to Live (July 15, 1968 – January 13, 2012)
- All My Children (January 5, 1970 – September 23, 2011)
- A World Apart (March 10, 1970 – June 25, 1971)
- The Best of Everything (March 30, 1970 – September 25, 1970)
- Ryan's Hope (July 7, 1975 – January 13, 1989)
- The Edge of Night (December 1, 1975 – December 28, 1984)
- Loving (June 26, 1983 – November 10, 1995)
- The City (October 13, 1995 – March 28, 1997)
- Port Charles (June 1, 1997 – October 3, 2003)

== Film presentations ==
- The Wonderful World of Disney (1954–1961; 1986–1988; 1997–2008)
- The ABC Sunday Night Movie (April 8, 1962 – August 2, 1998)
- ABC Movie of the Week (September 23, 1969 – May 14, 1975)
- ABC Theater (December 19, 1972 – 1985)
- The ABC Mystery Movie (February 6, 1989 – May 5, 1990)

== News programming ==
- Key to the Ages (Feb–May 1955)
- Our World (1986–1987)
- Primetime (1989–2012)
- Day One (1993–1995)
- Turning Point (1994–1999)
- 20/20 Downtown (1999–2002)
- Primetime Monday (2003)
- 20/20: In an Instant (2015–2017)
- People's List (2016)

== Saturday mornings ==
- The 13 Ghosts of Scooby-Doo (September 7 – December 7, 1985)
- The ABC Saturday Superstar Movie (September 9, 1972 – November 17, 1973)
- ABC Weekend Special (September 10, 1977 – August 30, 1997)
- The Addams Family (September 12, 1992 – January 7, 1995)
- The Adventures of Gulliver (September 14, 1968 – January 4, 1969)
- The Adventures of Rocky and Bullwinkle and Friends (1964–1973)
- The All-New Pink Panther Show (September 9, 1978 – December 23, 1978)
- Animals, Animals, Animals (1976–1981)
- Beany and Cecil (1964–1967)
- The Beatles (September 25, 1965 – October 21, 1967)
- Beetlejuice (September 9, 1989 – September 5, 1992)
- The Brady Kids (September 9, 1972 – October 6, 1973)
- The Bugs Bunny Show (August 1962 – September 8, 1968, September 8, 1973 – August 30, 1975, September 7, 1985 – September 2, 2000)
- Buzz Lightyear of Star Command (October 14, 2000 – September 8, 2001)
- The Buzz on Maggie (September 17, 2005 – January 21, 2006)
- The Care Bears Family (September 13, 1986 – October 31, 1987)
- Cattanooga Cats (September 6, 1969 – September 5, 1971)
- Cro (September 18, 1993 – July 15, 1995)
- Devlin (September 7, 1974 – December 21, 1974)
- Disney's Doug (September 7, 1996 – September 8, 2001)
- Dragon's Lair (September 8, 1984 – December 1, 1984)
- Dudley Do-Right (1969–1970)
- The Emperor's New School (January 28, 2006 – August 27, 2011)
- Even Stevens (September 22, 2001 – September 7, 2002; February 26, 2005 – September 10, 2005)
- Everyday Health (2011–2012)
- Expedition Wild (2013–2014)
- The Fantastic Four (September 9, 1967 – September 21, 1968)
- Fantastic Voyage (September 14, 1968 – January 4, 1969)
- Flash Forward (1996–1997)
- The Flintstone Kids (September 6, 1986 – May 26, 1990)
- The Fonz and the Happy Days Gang (November 8, 1980 – November 28, 1981)
- Food for Thought (2011–2013)
- Free Willy (September 24, 1994 – August 31, 1996)
- Fudge (January 14, 1995 – August 31, 1996)
- The Funky Phantom (September 11, 1971 – January 1, 1972)
- Gargoyles: The Goliath Chronicles (September 7, 1996 – February 15, 1997)
- George of the Jungle (September 9, 1967 – December 30, 1967)
- Goldie Gold and Action Jack (September 12, 1981 – December 5, 1981)
- Goober and the Ghost Chasers (September 8, 1973 – December 22, 1973)
- Groovie Goolies (1971–1972)
- The Great Dr. Scott (2018–2019)
- The Great Grape Ape Show (September 6, 1975 – December 13, 1975)
- H.E.L.P.! (1979)
- Hammerman (September 7, 1991 – September 5, 1992)
- Hannah Montana (September 9, 2006 – August 27, 2011)
- The Hardy Boys (September 6, 1969 – December 27, 1969)
- Heathcliff (October 4, 1980 – September 18, 1982)
- Hercules (September 12, 1998 – March 13, 1999)
- Here Come the Double Deckers! (September 12, 1970 – January 2, 1971)
- Hong Kong Phooey (September 7, 1974 – December 21, 1974)
- Hoppity Hooper (September 12, 1964 – September 2, 1967)
- Hot Wheels (September 6, 1969 – September 4, 1971)
- House of Mouse (January 13, 2001 – August 24, 2002)
- Issues and Answers (1960–1981)
- Jabberjaw (September 11, 1976 – December 18, 1976)
- Jackson 5ive (September 11, 1971 – October 14, 1972)
- The Jetsons (1963–1964)
- Jonny Quest (1970–1972)
- Journey to the Center of the Earth (September 9, 1967 – September 6, 1969)
- Jungle Cubs (October 5, 1996 – January 10, 1998)
- Junior Almost Anything Goes (September 11, 1976 – September 4, 1977)
- Kid Power (September 16, 1972 – September 1, 1974)
- Kids Are People Too (1978–1982)
- Kim Possible (September 14, 2002 – January 8, 2005; April 2, 2005 – September 2, 2006)
- The King Kong Show (September 10, 1966 – August 31, 1969)
- Korg: 70,000 B.C. (September 7, 1974 – August 30, 1975)
- The Krofft Supershow (September 11, 1976 – September 2, 1978)
- Lancelot Link, Secret Chimp (September 12, 1970 – January 2, 1971)
- Land of the Lost (September 7, 1991 – September 3, 1994)
- Lassie's Rescue Rangers (November 11, 1972 – December 22, 1973)
- Laverne & Shirley in the Army (October 10, 1981 – November 13, 1982)
- The Legend of Tarzan (July 13, 2002 – September 7, 2002)
- Lidsville (September 11, 1971 – September 8, 1973)
- Lilo & Stitch: The Series (September 20, 2003 – September 2, 2006)
- Linus the Lionhearted (1966–1969)
- The Little Clowns of Happytown (September 26, 1987 – July 16, 1988)
- Little Rosey (September 8, 1990 – August 31, 1991)
- The Littles (September 10, 1983 – November 2, 1985)
- Lizzie McGuire (September 22, 2001 – September 10, 2005)
- Lloyd in Space (February 3, 2001 – September 7, 2002)
- The Lost Saucer (September 6, 1975 – December 20, 1975)
- Madeline (September 16, 1995 – October 28, 1995)
- The Magilla Gorilla Show (1966–1967)
- Make a Wish (1971–1976)
- Mary-Kate and Ashley in Action! (October 27, 2001 – August 3, 2002)
- Menudo on ABC (1983–1985)
- Mickey Mouse Works (September 12, 1998 – January 6, 2001)
- Mighty Ducks: The Animated Series (September 6, 1996 – September 6, 1997)
- Mighty Morphin Power Rangers (January 2, 2010 – August 28, 2010)
- Mighty Orbots (September 8, 1984 – December 15, 1984)
- Milton the Monster (October 9, 1965 – September 8, 1968)
- Mission: Magic! (September 8, 1973 – December 22, 1973)
- Monchhichis (September 10 – December 3, 1983)
- The Monkees (1972–1973)
- Mork & Mindy/Laverne & Shirley/Fonz Hour (September 25, 1982 – September 3, 1983)
- The Mumbly Cartoon Show (September 11, 1976 – September 3, 1977)
- My Pet Monster (September 12, 1987 – December 19, 1987)
- NBA Inside Stuff (September 7, 2002 – August 28, 2004)
- The New Adventures of Gilligan (September 7, 1974 – October 18, 1975)
- The New Adventures of Winnie the Pooh (September 17, 1988 – September 7, 2002)
- The New Casper Cartoon Show (October 5, 1963 – January 30, 1970)
- New Kids on the Block (September 8, 1990 – August 24, 1991)
- The New Scooby and Scrappy-Doo Show (September 10, 1983 – December 10, 1983)
- The New Scooby-Doo Mysteries (September 8, 1984 – December 1, 1984)
- Nightmare Ned (April 19 – August 9, 1997)
- Ocean Mysteries with Jeff Corwin (2011–2016)
- Ocean Treks with Jeff Corwin (2016)
- The Oddball Couple (September 6, 1975 – December 20, 1975)
- One Saturday Morning (September 13, 1997 – September 7, 2002)
- The Osmonds (September 9, 1972 – December 23, 1972)
- Outback Adventures with Tim Faulkner (October 4, 2014 – September 30, 2017)
- The Oz Kids (September 14 – November 9, 1996)
- Pac-Man (September 25, 1982 – November 5, 1983)
- Pepper Ann (September 13, 1997 – January 27, 2001)
- Peter Potamus (1966–1968)
- Phil of the Future (September 25, 2004 – September 2, 2006)
- The Pirates of Dark Water (February 25, 1991 – September 5, 1992)
- The Plastic Man Comedy/Adventure Show (September 22, 1979 – February 28, 1981)
- The Porky Pig Show (September 20, 1964 – September 2, 1967)
- Pound Puppies (September 13, 1986 – December 19, 1987)
- Power Rangers (September 14, 2002 – August 28, 2010)
- Power Rangers Wild Force (September 14, 2002 – February 8, 2003)
- Power Rangers Ninja Storm (February 15, 2003 – February 14, 2004)
- Power Rangers Dino Thunder (February 21, 2004 – February 12, 2005)
- Power Rangers S.P.D. (February 26, 2005 – March 4, 2006)
- Power Rangers Mystic Force (March 11, 2006 – February 24, 2007)
- Power Rangers Operation Overdrive (March 3, 2007 – March 22, 2008)
- Power Rangers Jungle Fury (March 22, 2008 – February 28, 2009)
- Power Rangers RPM (March 7, 2009 – December 26, 2009)
- The Proud Family (August 31, 2002 – September 2, 2006)
- A Pup Named Scooby-Doo (September 10, 1988 – September 4, 1993)
- The Puppy's Further Adventures (September 25, 1982 – November 10, 1984)
- Quack Pack (1996–1997)
- The Real Ghostbusters (September 13, 1986 – September 5, 1992)
- ReBoot (1994–1995)
- Recess (September 13, 1997 – September 7, 2002)
- Recipe Rehab (April 2, 2012 – July 25, 2015)
- The Reluctant Dragon & Mr. Toad Show (September 12, 1970 – December 26, 1970)
- The Replacements (September 9, 2006 – August 27, 2011)
- Richie Rich (November 8, 1980 – September 1, 1984)
- Rocky and His Friends (1959–1961; 1964–1973)
- Rubik, the Amazing Cube (September 17, 1983 – December 10, 1983)
- Sabrina: The Animated Series (September 11, 1999 – October 20, 2001)
- Schoolhouse Rock! (January 6, 1973 – September 2, 2000)
- Science Court (September 13, 1997 – January 22, 2000)
- The Scooby-Doo/Dynomutt Hour (September 11, 1976 – December 18, 1976)
- Scooby-Doo and Scrappy-Doo (September 22, 1979 – January 5, 1980)
- Scooby's All-Star Laff-A-Lympics (September 10, 1977 – October 28, 1978)
- Sea Rescue (2012–2018)
- Skyhawks (September 6, 1969 – September 4, 1971)
- Sonic the Hedgehog (September 18, 1993 – June 24, 1995)
- Spider-Man (September 9, 1967 – August 30, 1969)
- Spider-Woman (September 22, 1979 – January 5, 1980)
- Squigglevision (September 12, 1998 – January 22, 2000)
- Star Wars: Droids (September 7, 1985 – June 7, 1986)
- The Suite Life of Zack & Cody (September 17, 2005 – August 27, 2011)
- Super Friends (September 8, 1973 – September 6, 1986)
- Tales from the Cryptkeeper (September 18, 1993 – July 15, 1995)
- Teacher's Pet (September 9, 2000 – September 7, 2002)
- Teamo Supremo (January 19 – September 7, 2002)
- That's So Raven (September 20, 2003 – August 27, 2011)
- The Tom and Jerry Show (September 6 – December 13, 1975)
- These Are the Days (September 7, 1974 – September 27, 1975)
- Thundarr the Barbarian (October 4, 1980 – October 31, 1981)
- Top Cat (1962–1963)
- Turbo Teen (September 15, 1984 – August 31, 1985)
- Uncle Croc's Block (September 6, 1975 – February 14, 1976)
- Vacation Creation (2017–2019)
- The Weekenders (February 26, 2000 – September 8, 2001)
- W.I.T.C.H. (December 18, 2004; January 15, 2005 – March 26, 2005)
- The Wildlife Docs (2013–2018)
- What-a-Mess (1995–1996)
- Wild West C.O.W.-Boys of Moo Mesa (September 12, 1992 – September 3, 1994)
- Will the Real Jerry Lewis Please Sit Down (September 12, 1970 – September 2, 1972)
- The Wizard of Oz (September 8, 1990 – December 28, 1990)
- Wolf Rock TV (September 8, 1984 – October 20, 1984)
- The Wuzzles (1986–1988)
- Yogi's Gang (September 8, 1973 – December 29, 1973)

== Specials ==
- The Wild Weird World of Dr. Goldfoot (November 18, 1965)
- Alice in Wonderland or What's a Nice Kid Like You Doing in a Place Like This? (March 30, 1966)
- The Mad, Mad, Mad Comedians (April 7, 1970)
- Hey, Cinderella! (April 10, 1970)
- The Night the Animals Talked (December 9, 1970)
- Here Comes Peter Cottontail (April 4, 1971)
- A Christmas Carol (December 21, 1971)
- The Enchanted World of Danny Kaye: The Emperor's New Clothes (February 21, 1972)
- ABC Afterschool Special (October 4, 1972 – January 23, 1997)
- The Cricket in Times Square (April 24, 1973)
- A Very Merry Cricket (December 14, 1973)
- The Muppets Valentine Show (January 30, 1974)
- Sinatra – The Main Event (October 13, 1974)
- Fred Astaire Salutes the Fox Musicals (October 24, 1974)
- Yes, Virginia, There Is a Santa Claus (December 6, 1974)
- The Year Without a Santa Claus (December 10, 1974)
- The Missiles of October (December 18, 1974)
- Yankee Doodle Cricket (January 16, 1975)
- An Evening with John Denver (March 10, 1975)
- The Muppet Show: Sex and Violence (March 19, 1975)
- John Denver's Rocky Mountain Christmas (December 10, 1975)
- The Honeymooners Second Honeymoon (February 2, 1976)
- John Denver and Friend (March 29, 1976)
- Charo and the Sergeant (August 24, 1976)
- The Dorothy Hamill Special (November 17, 1976)
- The John Denver Special (November 17, 1976)
- A Special Olivia Newton-John (November 17, 1976)
- Frosty's Winter Wonderland (December 2, 1976)
- Christmas in Disneyland (December 8, 1976)
- The Carpenters' First Television Special (December 8, 1976)
- Rudolph's Shiny New Year (December 10, 1976)
- The Barbara Walters Specials (December 14, 1976 – December 17, 2015)
- Dorothy Hamill Winter Carnival Special (March 2, 1977)
- John Denver: Thank God I'm a Country Boy (March 2, 1977)
- The Barry Manilow Special (March 2, 1977)
- Perry Como's Music from Hollywood (March 28, 1977)
- The Easter Bunny Is Comin' to Town (April 6, 1977)
- Sinatra and Friends (April 21, 1977)
- The Magic of ABC (September 7, 1977)
- The Making of Star Wars (September 16, 1977)
- Halloween Is Grinch Night (October 28, 1977)
- Thanksgiving Reunion with The Partridge Family and My Three Sons (November 25, 1977)
- The Honeymooners Christmas (November 28, 1977)
- Nestor, the Long-Eared Christmas Donkey (December 3, 1977)
- 'Twas the Night Before Christmas (December 7, 1977)
- The Carpenters at Christmas (December 9, 1977)
- Why the Bears Dance on Christmas Eve (December 12, 1977)
- Perry Como's Olde English Christmas (December 14, 1977)
- ABC's Silver Anniversary Celebration (February 5, 1978)
- The Honeymooners Valentine Special (February 13, 1978)
- John Denver in Australia (February 16, 1978)
- The Second Barry Manilow Special (February 24, 1978)
- Perry Como's Easter by the Sea (March 22, 1978)
- Pat Boone and Family Springtime Special (April 8, 1978)
- Dorothy Hamill Presents Winners (April 28, 1978)
- The Carpenters...Space Encounters (May 17, 1978)
- Olivia (May 17, 1978)
- Mother, Juggs & Speed (August 17, 1978)
- The Pink Panther in: A Pink Christmas (December 7, 1978)
- The Honeymooners Christmas Special (December 10, 1978)
- Perry Como's Early American Christmas (December 13, 1978)
- Perry Como's Springtime Special (April 9, 1979)
- The Cheryl Ladd Special (April 9, 1979)
- The 3rd Barry Manilow Special (May 23, 1979)
- The Halloween That Almost Wasn't (October 28, 1979)
- Rudolph and Frosty's Christmas in July (November 25, 1979)
- John Denver and the Muppets: A Christmas Together (December 5, 1979)
- Perry Como's Christmas in New Mexico (December 14, 1979)
- Scooby Goes Hollywood (December 23, 1979)
- The Pink Panther in: Olym-Pinks (February 22, 1980)
- Olivia Newton-John: Hollywood Nights (April 14, 1980)
- Pontoffel Pock, Where Are You? (May 2, 1980)
- The Carpenters: Music, Music, Music (May 16, 1980)
- Barry Manilow: One Voice (May 19, 1980)
- The Cheryl Ladd Special: Souvenirs (May 19, 1980)
- John Denver: The Higher We Fly (June 15, 1980)
- Pinocchio's Christmas (December 3, 1980)
- Emmet Otter's Jug-Band Christmas (December 15, 1980)
- The Pink Panther in: Pink at First Sight (February 14, 1981)
- John Denver with His Special Guest George Burns: Two of a Kind (March 30, 1981)
- John Denver: Music and the Mountains (April 24, 1981)
- The Muppets Go to the Movies (May 20, 1981)
- Perry Como's French-Canadian Christmas (December 12, 1981)
- Let's Get Physical (February 8, 1982)
- Hollywood: The Gift of Laughter (May 16, 1982)
- The Grinch Grinches the Cat in the Hat (May 20, 1982)
- The Big Easy (August 15, 1982)
- Callahan (September 9, 1982)
- The Fantastic Miss Piggy Show (September 17, 1982)
- Ziggy's Gift (December 1, 1982)
- Perry Como's Christmas in Paris (December 18, 1982)
- Rocky Mountain Holiday (May 12, 1983)
- Olympic Gala (July 28, 1984)
- The Cabbage Patch Kids' First Christmas (December 7, 1984)
- Perry Como's Christmas in Hawaii (December 14, 1985)
- The Christmas Toy (December 6, 1986)
- John Grin's Christmas (December 6, 1986)
- The Perry Como Christmas Special (December 6, 1986)
- Julie Andrews: The Sound of Christmas (December 16, 1987)
- A Muppet Family Christmas (December 16, 1987)
- The Earth Day Special (April 22, 1990)
- Beanpole (July 4, 1990)
- Dad's a Dog (July 6, 1990)
- Twin Peaks/Cop Rock: Behind the Scenes (September 14, 1990)
- An Evening with Friends of the Environment (September 19, 1990)
- Hammer, Slammer, & Slade (December 15, 1990)
- Dolly Parton: Christmas at Home (December 21, 1990)
- The Best of Disney: 50 Years of Magic (May 20, 1991)
- Winnie the Pooh and Christmas Too (December 14, 1991)
- The Happy Days Reunion Special (March 3, 1992)
- Bradymania: A Very Brady Special (May 19, 1993)
- Barbara Walters' 10 Most Fascinating People (December 9, 1993 – December 10, 2015)
- A Flintstone Family Christmas (December 18, 1993)
- Edith Ann: A Few Pieces of the Puzzle (January 18, 1994)
- Edith Ann: Homeless Go Home (May 27, 1994)
- The Wonderful World of Disney: 40 Years of Television Magic (December 10, 1994)
- The Laverne & Shirley Reunion (May 22, 1995)
- Peter and the Wolf (December 8, 1995)
- Edith Ann's Christmas (Just Say Noël) (December 14, 1996)
- Hey, Hey, It's the Monkees (February 17, 1997)
- Santa vs. the Snowman (December 13, 1997)
- A Winnie the Pooh Thanksgiving (November 22, 1998)
- Winnie the Pooh: A Valentine for You (February 13, 1999)
- A Rosie Christmas (December 5, 1999)
- Peanuts animated specials (2001–2020; moved to Apple TV)
- The Carol Burnett Show: Show Stoppers (November 26, 2001)
- American Bandstand: 50th Anniversary Celebration (May 3, 2002)
- Laverne & Shirley: Together Again (May 7, 2002)
- Tim Allen Presents: A User's Guide to Home Improvement (May 4, 2003)
- ABC's 50th Anniversary Celebration (May 19, 2003)
- SOAPnet Salutes ABC Daytime (September 1, 2003)
- SOAPnet Reveals ABC Soap Secrets (August 16, 2004 – August 26, 2005)
- Happy Days: 30th Anniversary Reunion (February 3, 2005)
- How the Grinch Stole Christmas! (2006–2014; moved to NBC)
- Shrek the Halls (2007–2022; moved to NBC)
- Conveyor Belt of Love (2010)
- Lady Gaga and the Muppets Holiday Spectacular (November 28, 2013)
- Live in Front of a Studio Audience (2019)
- The Muppet Show (February 4, 2026)

== Sports programming ==
- ABC's Wide World of Sports (1961–1998)
- Professional Bowlers Tour (1962–1997)
- Monday Night Baseball (1976–1988)
- Rose Bowl Game (1989–2010)
- Thursday Night Baseball (1989)
- The Baseball Network (1994–1995)
- Arena Football League (1998–2002; 2007–2008)
