= Scott Turner Schofield =

American actor, writer and producer

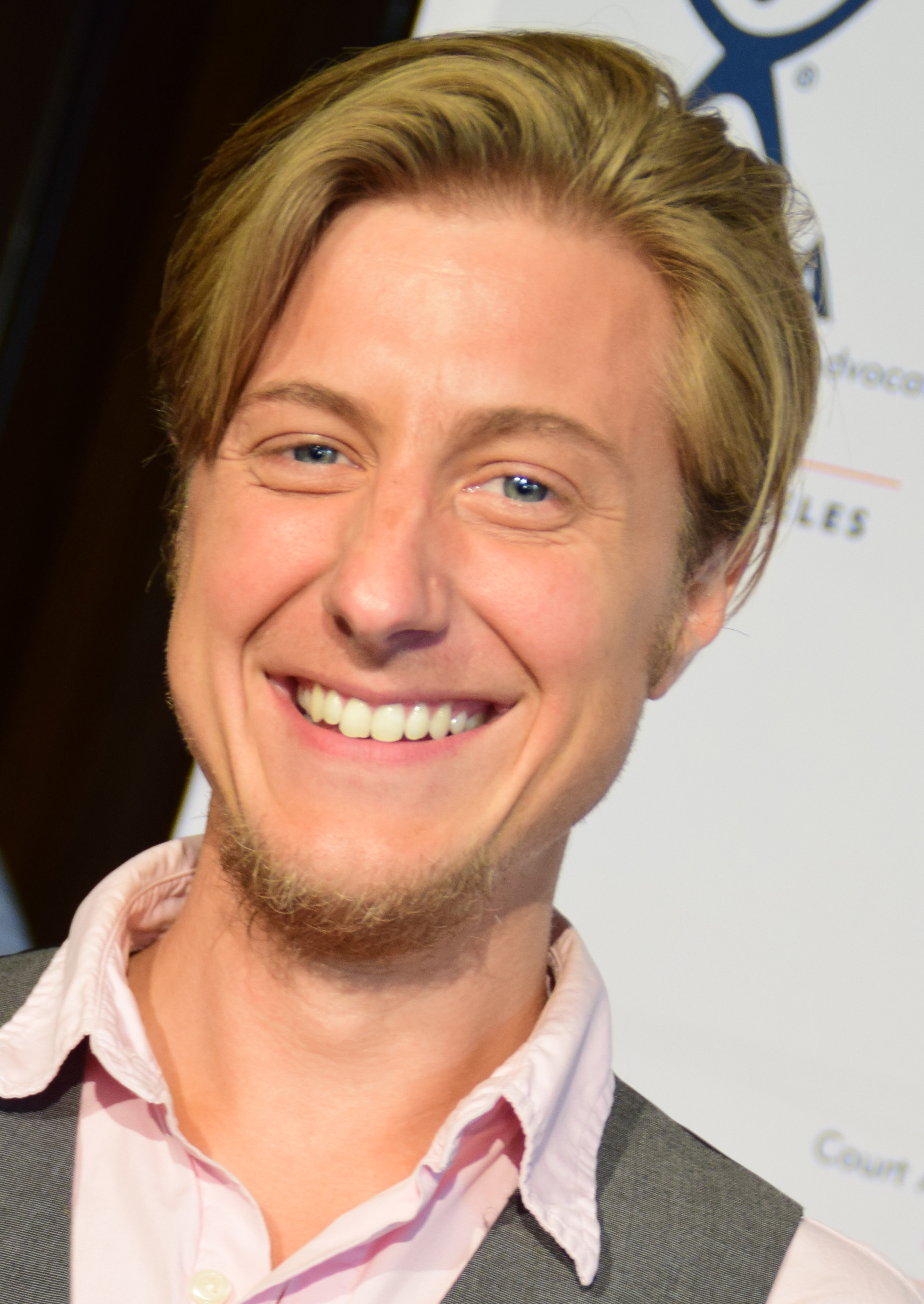
Schofield in May 2015

Scott Turner Schofield is an American actor, writer, producer, and speaker. He is a transgender activist, and uses he/him and they/them pronouns. He was the first out transgender actor in Daytime television, and the first out trans man to earn an Emmy nomination for acting.

Schofield has performed in film, TV, theatre, and streaming productions. In addition to performing, he has produced, written, directed, and consulted on several projects in film, TV, streaming content, and theatre.

A collection of Schofield's three solo performance scripts was published by Homofactus Press titled Two Truths and a Lie. Jack Halberstam wrote the foreword. The book was a finalist for the Lambda Literary Awards in the Drama and Transgender categories; it was placed on the American Library Association's 2009 Rainbow List.

Schofield's work as an activist and public speaker has focused on education in regard to transgender issues and awareness. He has assisted in the creation of training programs, institutional support programs, and nondiscrimination policies in educational, government, and corporate settings.

== Filmography ==
Scott Turner Schofield has appeared in films ranging from art house shorts to major feature length releases; including the Antonia Brico biopic The Conductor, directed by Maria Peters, and Becoming a Man in 127 EASY Steps which is based on his award-winning live performance art piece of the same name.

Film credits include:

- Off Ramp - Silas, Directed by Nathan Tape
- Becoming a Man in 127 EASY Steps - Self, Created by Scott Turner Schofield
- The Conductor (De Dirigent)- Robin, Directed by Maria Peters
- The Gaybysitters Club - Logan, Directed by Savannah Dooley
- Transmute - Chris, Directed by Star Victoria

== Television ==
In May 2015, Schofield became the first out transgender actor on daytime television, as the recurring character Nick on the CBS's The Bold And The Beautiful.

Acting credits include:

- The Blacklist, season 8, episode 21, "Nachalo". Real Raymond Reddington, CBS
- Equal, (Docuseries) Craig Rodwell, HBO Max
- The Bold and the Beautiful, Nick, recurring guest, CBS.
- Conveyor Belt of Love, contestant, ABC.
- Strange History, Guest Star, The History Channel.

=== Digital ===
Schofield is involved in diverse offerings on series streaming platforms.

- Studio City, Max/Dr. Brantley, recurring guest, Amazon Originals.
- Pride: The Series, Liev, recurring guest, Amazon Originals.

=== Live Host ===
- Speaking of Transgender, Interview Series on SpareMin.
- Equality CA Awards Dinners, Host, Palm Springs, San Francisco.
- On The Rocks, Recurring Co-Host, UBN.
- Trans*Mission+, Emcee, Gender Odyssey.
- Fresh Meat, Emcee, Theater Artaud, San Francisco, CA.

=== Industrials ===
- Everybody Changes, Principal, Transgender inclusion training video.

=== Producer ===
- They/Them, Executive Producer, written and directed by John Logan. (Blumhouse Productions / Peacock )
- Anything’s Possible, Impact Producer, written by Ximena García Lecuona, directed by Billy Porter. (Amazon Originals)
- Off Ramp, Co-Producer, written by Tim Cairo, directed by Nathan Tape.
- Not Dating, Producer, (Web Series), created by, and starring, Puppett and Lise Johnson.
- Becoming a Man in 127 EASY Steps, Producer, creator, writer, actor.
- Everybody Changes - Everybody Changes, Best practices for transgender inclusion in recreational settings. (Video E-Course). Executive Producer. Creator and Writer.

=== Consultant ===
- Euphoria, seasons 1, 2, and 3, HBO Max.
- Z-O-M-B-I-E-S 3, Disney+, (The Disney Channel)
- The Craft: Legacy, written & directed by Zoe Lister-Jones. (Blumhouse Productions, Amazon Originals)
- WE’RE HERE, season 1, HBO Max.
- One of Us is Lying, season 2, Netflix.
- The GLAAD List. A list of the best unproduced LGBTQ screenplays of the year. (Released at the 2020 Sundance Film Festival)

== Theatre ==
Schofield has worked in theatre as a performer, writer, director, and artistic director.

He is best known for a trilogy of critically acclaimed autobiographical works, which focus on the life experience of being Queer, transitioning, and life beyond transition. Underground Transit; A spoken word performance taking on academic Queer Theory in the real life of one transition. Debutante Balls; A performance piece on coming out into Southern Society as a lesbian, radical feminist, and finally, as a transgender man. The award-winning Becoming a Man in 127 EASY Steps which includes short stories, songs, and short films that center an epic trans life—before, during, and 20 years beyond transition. Excerpts of each of these were performed as part of the nationally touring variety show, the 'Tranny Roadshow.'

Schofield was honored by the Princess Grace Foundation-USA, where he received the Gant Gaither Award, a theater fellowship in acting. Schofield carried out his fellowship at 7 Stages in Atlanta, where he worked as the assistant to French director Eric Vigner on Bernard Marie Koltes' play In the Solitude of Cotton Fields; with German actress Anne Tismer on Gutes Tun/Doing Good Things; and with American actress/director Crystal Dickinson on Pearl Cleage's play A Song for Coretta. Schofield also became the first out transgender creator to receive a National Performance Network Creation Fund to produce Becoming a Man in 127 EASY Steps. The commission was supported by The Pat Graney Company in Seattle, DiverseWorks in Houston, and 7 Stages in Atlanta.

Schofield became the artistic director of Out North Contemporary Art House in Anchorage Alaska. He curated 3 seasons of performance, film, music, and visual arts. Schofield accepted an ACLU Award as a Hero for Constitutional Rights on behalf of Out North's founders, volunteers, and artists, who persisted through nine separate censorship attacks over 25 years. During his tenure as artistic director he conceived of the Art House Residency Program. The program was subsequently funded for $250,000 by ArtPlace America.

Schofield moved to France to work again with Éric Vigner on a play by Christophe Honoré titled La Faculté. He worked with the Academy of the Théâtre de Lorient and actress Jutta Johanna Weiss on the world premiere at the 2012 Festival d'Avignon. The play was also performed at the National Theatres of France, touring France in the 2012–13 season to Lorient, Toulouse, Clermont-Ferrand, Reims, and Orleans.

=== Festival Performances ===
- Morphologies, Queer Performance Festival, Minneapolis, MN, USA
- Festival d’Avignon, Mainstage, Avignon, France
- Festival des Libertés, Headliner, Brussels, Belgium
- Fresh Fruit Festival, New York City, NY, USA
- "National Performance Network", Annual Meeting, Seattle, WA, USA
- Single File Festival, Chicago, IL, USA
- SEEN+HEARD Festival, Atlanta, GA, USA
- FUSE: the NYC Celebration of Queer Culture, New York City, NY, USA
- Alternate R.O.O.T.S, Annual Meeting, Winder, Georgia, USA
- SEEN+HEARD Festival, Atlanta, GA, USA
- Philadelphia Fringe Festival, Adjudicated, Philadelphia, PA, USA

=== Theatre Performances ===
- A Kind of Weather, (Kid), by Sylvan Oswald. directed by Eric Hoff . Kirk Douglas Theatre, Los Angeles, CA, USA
- I Am My Own Wife, (Alfred Kirshner/Nazis/Stasi), by Doug Wright, directed by Danny Gordon, producer Jacob Tobias, Renberg Theatre, Los Angeles, CA, USA
- La Faculté, (Stéphane), by Christophe Honoré, directed by Eric Vigner, National Theater of France, Festival d’Avignon, Avignon, France
- Becoming a Man in 127 EASY Steps, (One Man Show), writer, director. Producers: The Pat Graney Company, DiverseWorks, 7 Stages, National Performance Network. Premiered at the Capitol Hill Arts Center Seattle, Washington. Over 20 international productions.
- Words Can't Describe Series, A collaboration with S. Bear Bergman. Drag kings, and community workshops. Atlanta, GA, USA; San Antonio, TX, USA; Seattle, WA, USA.
- Wizzer Pizzer, (Kandi/ Jack), by Amy Wheeler, directed by Melissa Foulger, 7 Stages, Atlanta, GA, USA
- Debutante Balls, (One Man Show), writer, directed by Steve Bailey. Has toured with over 50 productions in the United States. Premiere: 2004 Chicago Single File Festival, Chicago, IL, USA.
- The Southern Gents Tour, in collaboration with the Athens Boys Choir, US tour.
- Underground TRANSit, (One Man Show), international tour with over 50 productions. Premiered Charis Books & More, Atlanta, GA, USA

=== Playwriting ===
- Two Ways To Surrender. One-act play. Production: Staged reading, Emory Brave New Works Festival, Atlanta, GA, USA.
- Transmission. Full-length play, (French). A young queer artist struggles with the ghosts of would-be mentors: Jack Smith, Ethyl Eichelberger, and other artists lost to the AIDS epidemic (1980–95) in New York. Production: Centre Dramatique de Bretagne, Rennes, FR. Supported by a Princess Grace Foundation Special Projects Grant.
- You Can Sleep While I Drive. 10 minute play. 1950s heterosexuality meets modern queer culture in one short drive down Sunset Blvd. Production: Staged reading, Emory Brave New Works Festival, Atlanta, GA, USA.
- Becoming A Man In 127 Easy Steps. One man show. Producers: Pat Graney Company, DiverseWorks, 7 Stages, National Performance Network. Premiered at the Capitol Hill Arts Center Seattle, Washington. Over 20 international productions.
- Turn Me On. Full-length play. A bisexual woman in a midlife crisis meets a transgender twenty-something, and together the two find the oddest of intimacies. Production: Staged reading, featuring Sheri Mann Stewart, Emory Brave New Works Festival, Atlanta, GA, USA..

=== Directing ===
- Transmission. Full-length play, (French). Production: Centre Dramatique de Bretagne, Rennes, FR. Supported by a Princess Grace Foundation Special Projects Grant.
- 30 Below. (One person show), Festival of Alaskan Artists. Production: Out North Contemporary Art House, Anchorage, AK, USA

== Activism ==
Scott Turner Schofield has worked with over 100 major universities and corporations, educating on transgender cultural competency and workplace diversity and inclusion.

Schofield's work includes the popular TED Talk “Ending Gender” (TEDx Houston, 2013) and the eCourse Everybody Changes, which teaches inclusivity for trans and gender non-conforming individuals using locker rooms.

Schofield collaborated with Joey Soloway, in partnership with 5050by2020 (a project of the Time's Up Movement) to lead their Trans Masculine Cohort. The group brings trans masculine professionals in Hollywood for educational and collaborative opportunities.

In 2018, when Scarlett Johansson experienced backlash for attempting to play a transgender character, Schofield acted in a viral video featuring trans men auditioning for roles Johansson had played starring D’Lo, Justin Chow, and Rocco Kayiotis. He participated in industry round tables and was highlighted in the Associated Press and The Hollywood Reporter’s coverage of trans entertainment professionals responding to the issue.

=== Thought Leadership ===
Schofield's work is centered on gender expansion in culture, as a speaker and writer engaging social change on transgender issues.

- Gender Education deMystification Symposium (GEMS) 2020 Conference keynote address, Salt Lake City, UT, USA.
- Outfest's Trans Masculinity in Media Panel leader, 2019 Los Angeles, CA.
- “Transforming Athletics” webinar, SpeakOut
- “Everybody Changes” E-Course.
- “Gendered Spaces” webinar, American Institute of Architects.
- Schofield, Scott Turner. "1 Trans Actor on Representation in This Year’s Oscar Race", Backstage.Com. Backstage, November 7, 2019. https://www.backstage.com/magazine/article/trans-actor-representation-years-oscar-race-1873/.
- Kilkenny, Katie. "Trans Men Audition For Old Scarlett Johansson Roles In Parody Video". Hollywood Reporter.Com. The Hollywood Reporter, July 10, 2018. https://www.hollywoodreporter.com/movies/movie-news/trans-men-audition-old-scarlett-johansson-roles-parody-video-1126172/
- First Outfest “Trans in Hollywood” Panel. Los Angeles, CA, USA.
- TEDx Houston. Scott Turner Schofield. “Ending Gender”, Nov 4, 2013, Houston, TX, USA, video, 16:25, https://www.youtube.com/watch?v=TWubtUnSfA0
- National Lesbian and Gay Journalist's Association Annual Meeting 2006 plenary speaker.

== Bibliography ==
Schofield, Scott Turner. "1 Trans Actor on Representation in This Year’s Oscar Race", Backstage.Com. Backstage, November 7, 2019. https://www.backstage.com/magazine/article/trans-actor-representation-years-oscar-race-1873/.

Schofield, Scott Turner. “Are We There Yet? On Being and Becoming a Transgender Performance Artist.” In Self Organizing Men, edited by Jay Sennet. Ypsilanti, Michigan: Homofactus Press, 2006.

Schofield, Scott Turner.“Becoming a Man...” - FourTwoNine Magazine, April issue, 2017

Schofield, Scott Turner. “Coming of Age—Still. Performance / Manifesto.”. Women & Performance: a Journal of Feminist Theory, New York University, no. 28. (2004).

TED Talk “Ending Gender” (TEDx Houston, 2013) Scott Turner Schofield “Ending Gender”, Nov 4, 2013, Houston, TX, USA, video, 16:25, https://www.youtube.com/watch?v=TWubtUnSfA0

Advocate Video Team. "The Advocate: Ask a Trans Man With Scott Turner Schofield" September 12, 2017. Video, 5 min 26 sec. https://www.advocate.com/video/2017/9/12/ask-trans-man-scott-turner-schofield

Schofield, Scott Turner. “The Wrong Body.” In Gender Outlaws: The Next Generation, edited by Kate Bornstein and S. Bear Bergman, Berkeley, California: Seal Press, 2010.

Schofield, Scott Turner. “Underground Transit”. Excerpt in [Becoming] Young Ideas on Gender, Identity and Sexuality, edited by- Diane Anderson-Minshall and Gina Devries, Chicago, Illinois:ExLIbris Group, Clarivate, 2004.

Schofield, Scott Turner. “Underground Transit”. In National Transgender Theater Festival Reader, New York: Renegade, 2003.

== Awards and Distinctions ==
- Emmy Award Nomination as Outstanding Guest Performer Digital Drama for the role of Max in Studio City.
- "Becoming a Man in 127 EASY Steps" Programmed in the 19th Annual Tribeca Film Festival.
- Independent Series Award Nomination for Best Guest Actor; Studio City—Amazon Studios.
- Up North Pride, Grand Marshal. Traverse City, MI.
- Independent Series Award Nomination for Best Guest Actor "Pride: The Series"—Amazon Studios.
- LA LGBT Center Rolf Uribe Award, Models of Pride;
- Daytime Emmy Nomination, Guest Actor, "The Bold and the Beautiful''—CBS.
- Emory University LGBTQ Person of the Year.
- Trinity College Dublin Award for Significant Contribution to LGBTQ Culture.
- Campus Pride Hot! List - Top 25 LGBT Speakers.
- Lambda Literary Award Finalist in both Drama and Transgender categories.
- Princess Grace Foundation Special Projects Grant.
- Atlanta Pride Grand Marshal, Atlanta, GA.
- Named “Best Trans Activist” by Southern Voice Readers
- National Performance Network Community Fund Grant.
- Princess Grace Foundation Fellowship
- First out trans artist commissioned by the National Performance Network
- Sister City Playwright's Project Special Projects Grant The Playwrights’ Center, Minneapolis/ The Playwriting Center at Emory Theatre.
- “Young Trans Hero” distinction from The Advocate;
- Playwriting Center of Theater Emory Special Projects Grant.
- Tanne Foundation Award for Commitment to Artistic Excellence.
- Atlanta's Best Local Artist Southern Voice Reader's Choice
