= Save My Life: Boston Trauma =

- Genre: Documentary; Reality
- Created by: Julie Plec
- Directed by: Blake Lively; Nina Dobrev; Candice King; Torrey DeVitto; Chuck Hogan
- Presented by: Stephen Amell; Paul Wesley; James Harvey Ward; Riley Smith; Jake Picking; Erik von Detten; Michael Trevino; Torrey DeVitto; Taylor Momsen; Persia White; Melissa Fumero; Candice King; Nina Dobrev; Janina Gavankar; Erin Wilhelmi; Spencer Grammer; Malese Jow; David Gallagher; Sean Faris; Chris Brochu; Carter Jenkins; Polly Draper; Taissa Farmiga; Bug Hall; Marguerite Moreau; Stuart Townsend; Debra Monk; Kayla Ewell; Marisa Ryan; Kathryn Erbe; Maura Tierney; Michaela McManus; Taylor Kinney; David Corenswet; Mekia Cox; Harrison Gilbertson; Blake Lively; Eric Lively; Annie Wersching; Patrick Renna; Bug Hall; Bianca Santos; Alyssa Diaz; Marnette Patterson; Ana Nogueira; Alex McKenna
- Narrated by: Kristen Bell
- Country of origin: United States
- Original language: English
- No. of seasons: 1
- No. of episodes: 6

Production
- Executive producer: Terence Wrong
- Producers: Julie Plec; Blake Lively; Nina Dobrev; Candice King; Torrey DeVitto; Chuck Hogan; Rebecca Hall; Corena Chase; Kerry Dunbar
- Production locations: Boston, Massachusetts
- Camera setup: Single-camera
- Running time: 42 minutes
- Production companies: ABC News; Lincoln Square Productions, LLC; Alloy Entertainment; Fake Empire; Warner Bros Television

Original release
- Network: ABC
- Release: July 19 – August 30, 2015

Related
- Boston Med; Hopkins; NY Med; Boston EMS

Save My Life: Boston Trauma (referred to on-air simply by its prefix title) is a medical documentary series on ABC, which premiered on July 19, 2015. It follows the medical staff of three hospitals specializing in trauma care in Boston, Massachusetts – the Boston Medical Center, Massachusetts General Hospital, and Brigham and Women's Hospital – and the patients being treated in those facilities. The series is produced by ABC News through its production subsidiary Lincoln Square Productions, and is part of the production company's True Medicine documentary format.

== Episodes ==
No.	Title	Original release date	U.S. viewers (millions)
1	"Episode 1"	July 19, 2015	3.42
2	"Episode 2"	July 26, 2015	3.30
3	"Episode 3"	August 2, 2015	3.18
4	"Episode 4"	August 9, 2015	3.17
5	"Episode 5"	August 16, 2015	3.28
6	"Episode 6"	August 30, 2015	N/A
