= Boston EMS (TV series) =

- Genre: Documentary; Reality
- Theme music composer: Harry Gregson Williams
- Composer: Harry Gregson Williams
- Country of origin: United States
- Original language: English
- No. of seasons: 2
- No. of episodes: 11

Production
- Executive producer: Terence Wrong
- Production locations: Boston, Massachusetts
- Camera setup: Single-camera
- Running time: 42 minutes
- Production companies: ABC News; Lincoln Square Productions, LLC; Village Roadshow Pictures; Alloy Entertainment

Original release
- Network: ABC
- Release: July 25, 2015 – September 3, 2016

Related
- Boston Med; Hopkins; NY Med; Save My Life: Boston Trauma

Boston EMS is a medical documentary series which premiered on ABC on July 25, 2015. It follows one of America's most seasoned teams of first responders in Boston, Massachusetts. The series is produced by ABC News through its production subsidiary Lincoln Square Productions, and is part of the production company's True Medicine documentary format.

== Episodes ==
=== Season 1 (2015) ===
No. overall	No. in season	Title	Original release date	US viewers (millions)
1	1	"Episode 1"	July 25, 2015	2.78
2	2	"Episode 2"	August 1, 2015	2.90
3	3	"Episode 3"	August 8, 2015	2.19
4	4	"Episode 4"	August 15, 2015	2.48
5	5	"Episode 5"	August 22, 2015	2.17

=== Season 2 (2016) ===
No. overall	No. in season	Title	Original release date	US viewers (millions)
6	1	"Episode 1"	July 30, 2016	1.91
7	2	"Episode 2"	August 6, 2016	1.78
8	3	"Episode 3"	August 13, 2016	2.07
9	4	"Episode 4"	August 20, 2016	2.49
10	5	"Episode 5"	August 27, 2016	2.45
11	6	"Episode 6"	September 3, 2016	2.59
