= Speak Out =

Speak Out, SpeakOut or Speaking Out may refer to:

== Advocacy ==
- SpeakOUT (Boston), LGBTQIA speakers' bureau in Boston, Mass (USA)
- Speak Out (newsletter), feminist newsletter published by the Brixton Black Women's Group, 1977-1983

== Media ==
- Speak Out (film), a French comedy-drama film
- Speak Out, an album by Bold
- "Speak Out Now", single from the 2011 self-titled album Oh, Land
- SpeakOut (TV program), debate show on The Filipino Channel
- Speaking Out, program on ABC Radio Sydney
- Speak Out, journal published by Speech Pathology Australia

== Other ==
- 7-Eleven Speak Out Wireless, prepaid wireless service offered by 7-Eleven

== See also ==
- Speaking Out movement
