= Ball boy (disambiguation) =

A ball boy is a person who retrieves balls for players or officials in tennis and other sports.

Ball boy or ballboy may also refer to:

- Ball Boys, an American reality television show
- Ball Boy (Beano), a comic strip character from The Beano
- Ballboy, a character in the Japanese tokusatsu series Seiun Kamen Machineman
- Ballboy (band), a Scottish indie group
