= The First 40 Years =

Sinatra and Friends

Video by Frank Sinatra
- Released: 2002
- Recorded: 1979
- Genre: Jazz; Vocal
- Length: 50:00
- Label: Warner Bros. Records

Frank Sinatra chronology
Sinatra and Friends (1977)	Sinatra and Friends (2002)	The Man and His Music (1981)

The First 40 Years is a 1979 television special by American singer Frank Sinatra on his 40th anniversary in show business.

== Track listing ==
1. "My Way" - 2:13
2. "If I Could Be with You" - 0:13
3. "Ciribiribin" - 0:30
4. "The Two O'Clock Jump" - 2:04
5. "You Make Me Feel So Young" - 0:09
6. "In My Merry Oldsmobile" [Background Piano] - 1:30
7. "Young at Heart" - 0:22
8. "I'm Getting Sentimental Over You" - 0:24
9. "Over There" - 0:11
10. "Take Me out of the Ballgame" - 0:19
11. "Holiday for Strings" - 2:29
12. "New York, New York" - 0:22
13. "My Kind of Town" - 1:09
14. "I Left My Heart in San Francisco" - 1:32
15. "At Long Last Love" - 0:14
16. "Just One of Those Things - 0:11
17. "The Candy Man" - 0:26
18. "The Lady Is a Tramp" - 2:38
19. "Too Marvelous for Words" - 0:10
20. "My Way" - 2:55
21. "Bullfight Music" - 0:17
22. "One for My Baby (And One More for the Road)" - 0:19
23. "Good Night Sweetheart" - 0:28
24. "Theme from New York, New York" - 3:19
25. "It Was a Very Good Year" - 4:19
26. "The Best Is Yet to Come" - 2:58
27. "I've Got You Under My Skin" - 3:33
28. "I've Got the World on a String" - 2:07
29. "Instrumental Intro" - 0:10
30. "All the Way" - 0:13
31. "Happy Birthday" - 0:28
32. "Put Your Dreams Away (For Another Day)"
