= Sinatra – The Main Event (TV program) =

- Genre: Musical special
- Directed by: Bill Carruthers
- Starring: Frank Sinatra
- Country of origin: United States
- Original language: English
- No. of episodes: 1

Production
- Producers: Jerry Weintraub, Roone Arledge
- Running time: 60 minutes

Original release
- Network: ABC
- Release: October 13, 1974

Related
- Magnavox Presents Frank Sinatra; Sinatra and Friends

== Sinatra: The Main Event ==
Sinatra: The Main Event was broadcast live on ABC on October 13, 1974, documenting Frank Sinatra’s return to Madison Square Garden in New York City after coming out of his short-lived retirement.

Production, Roone Arledge, and Howard Cosell

The television special was masterminded by producer Jerry Weintraub alongside ABC Sports president Roone Arledge, who brought a high-energy, sporting-event grandeur to the broadcast. Arledge and Weintraub specifically chose Howard Cosell to introduce the concert because of his legendary status and authoritative voice covering major boxing and sports championships. Cosell famously framed the musical event using sports vernacular, comparing Sinatra to an undefeated heavyweight champion coming out of retirement to face the ultimate test.

Staging and Musical Accompaniment

Breaking away from standard proscenium concert staging, the production set up a boxing-style ring in the exact center of Madison Square Garden, allowing a packed crowd of over 20,000 spectators to surround Sinatra on all sides. Musical accompaniment was provided by legendary jazz bandleader Woody Herman and his Thundering Herd, with arrangements and musical direction conducted by Don Costa.

Celebrity Sightings and Interruptions

Accurate to its live television format, the broadcast periodically panned to a front-row audience packed with major cultural and entertainment figures, including Bob Hope, Robert Redford, Milton Berle, Lucille Ball, Carroll O'Connor, Walter Cronkite and Henny Youngman. Throughout the performance, audience members and fans crowded up to the edges of the ring-stage, offering gratuity and excitement for the show. Sinatra interacted with the crowd, pausing between vocal numbers to acknowledge the roaring New York audience and maintaining a lighthearted, conversational rapport despite the rigid timing constraints of network television.

Legacy and Reception

While musicians like saxophonist Jerry Dodgion later noted that the intricate demands of live television production slightly disrupted the natural momentum of Sinatra's live set, the broadcast became a legendary television milestone. The audio highlights released concurrently as the live album The Main Event – Live earned a Grammy Award nomination for Album of the Year in 1975, cementing the event's enduring place in pop culture history.

== Track List ==
1. Introduction by Howard Cosell: "It Was a Very Good Year"/"All the Way"/"My Kind of Town"
2. "The Lady Is a Tramp"
3. "I Get a Kick Out of You"
4. "Let Me Try Again"
5. "Autumn in New York"
6. "I've Got You Under My Skin"
7. "Bad, Bad Leroy Brown"
8. "Angel Eyes"
9. "You Are the Sunshine of My Life"
10. "The House I Live In"
11. "My Kind of Town"
12. "My Way"
