= Conveyor Belt of Love =

2010 reality television special

- Genre: Reality television
- Narrated by: Dale Inghram
- Country of origin: United States
- Original language: English

Production
- Executive producers: Tom Shelly; Alex Duda
- Running time: 1 hour
- Production company: Endemol USA

Original release
- Network: ABC
- Release: January 4, 2010

Conveyor Belt of Love is an American reality television special broadcast by the American Broadcasting Company (ABC). Initially intended to serve as a backdoor pilot, the one-hour special premiered on January 4, 2010. The special depicted a panel of five women selecting a suitor among a group of thirty men. The women were seated in front of a conveyor belt, in which the men were individually rotated out for a period of one minute. During this minute, the men were required to display a talent or skill in order to make a positive impression on the women. At the end of each minute, the women raised a paddle indicating whether or not they were interested. American voice actor Dale Inghram served as the special's narrator.

== Format ==
The one-hour special followed a panel of five women who had the opportunity to choose a suitor among a group of thirty men. The women were seated in front of a large conveyor belt, which individually rotated the men out for a period of one minute each. As the men were rotated out, they had an opportunity to display a talent or skill in order to make a positive impression on the women. Following the end of this one-minute period, each woman raised a paddle that read either "interested" or "not interested". If a man was selected by one of the five women, he was asked to step down from the conveyor belt and stand aside as the other men rotated by. The women had the ability to swap out the man they claimed they were interested in if they were more impressed by a subsequent man on the conveyor belt. If two women claimed they were interested in the same man, then the man had the ability to choose which of the two women he would like to pursue. American voice actor Dale Inghram served as the special's narrator.

== Production ==
The special was based on the concept of speed dating, with the added twist of the women having sole control over the date. Executive producer Tom Shelly explained that "the power is completely in the women’s hands. They get to sit back and just listen to these guys do their 60-second pitch and the pressure is on!"

== Reception ==
Conveyor Belt of Love received generally mixed reviews from television critics. Randee Dawn of The Hollywood Reporter criticized the "glacial pace" of the special in addition to the contestants, who she believed all had "a half-baked shtick". James Poniewozik of Time claimed that the special objectified men, although he believed its "unashamed ridiculousness" made the special easy to enjoy. Sandra Gonzales of Entertainment Weekly criticized the special; she believed it largely consisted of "quippy insults provided by the resident Tila Tequila wannabe, awkward come-ons, and a parade of men you really don’t want to believe actually exist in the world (but we all know they do)." Brian Lowry of Variety claimed the special was "a fabulously stupid puree of The Dating Game, The Gong Show and The Bachelor." Several contributors from The Guardian claimed that the special was "[s]omehow offensive to both chauvinists and feminists." Linda Holmes of NPR referred to the special as "trash", in which she claimed that she turned it off after only five minutes.

The special experienced a series of controversies due to the personal lives of several contestants. Prior to the special's premiere, LGBT magazine Unzipped reported that contestant Kekoa Nalu had previously appeared in gay pornography. The magazine revealed that Nalu had appeared nude on the cover of Men in addition to filming four hardcore scenes for Randy Blue under the stage name Jarrett Rex. Additionally, Reality Blurred reported that one of the performers, Scott Turner Schofield, was a transgender performance artist. Two months after the special's premiere, contestant Johnny Pride was arrested over allegations that he raped two 14-year-old girls.

=== Ratings ===
Conveyor Belt of Love was intended to serve as a backdoor pilot, in which a series order was dependent on the special's ratings. The special premiered to a 2.7 rating/7 share with 6.5 million viewers. ABC expressed interest in ordering more episodes of Conveyor Belt of Love, however, ABC Entertainment Group President Steve McPherson expressed doubt over a continuation of the special.

== Adaptations ==
Adaptations of the series aired in both Spain and Russia (Конвейер любви). The Brazilian version entitled (Rola ou Enrola) premiered in 2011 as part of the Eliana show on SBT and was on the air until 2023. An adaptation was also in consideration for the United Kingdom.
