= Studio City (disambiguation) =

Studio City is a neighborhood in Los Angeles.

Studio City may also refer to:

- Studio City (Macau), a hotel and casino resort on Macau's Cotai area
- Studio City (album), by Brad Laner/Electric Company
- Studio City Sound, a recording studio
