= Sinatra and Friends =

Video by Frank Sinatra
- Released: 2002
- Recorded: 1977
- Genres: Jazz; Vocal
- Length: 49:48
- Label: Warner Bros.

Frank Sinatra chronology
Sinatra - The Main Event (1974)	Sinatra and Friends (2002)	The First 40 Years (1979)

Sinatra and Friends is an American television special that aired on April 21, 1977, on ABC. Featuring contemporary artists such as John Denver and Natalie Cole, as well as Dean Martin, Tony Bennett, Loretta Lynn, Leslie Uggams and Robert Merrill, Sinatra performs duets of standards in different styles such as folk and country in addition to each singer performing solo.

Sinatra and Friends was released on DVD in 2002.

== Track listing ==
1. "Where or When" (Sinatra and Company)
2. "I've Got You Under My Skin" (Sinatra)
3. "I Get a Kick Out of You" (Sinatra and Cole)
4. "I've Got Love on My Mind" (Cole)
5. "If I Were a Rich Man" (Merrill)
6. "The Oldest Established (Permanent Floating Crap Game in New York)" (Sinatra, Martin, Merrill)
7. "She's Got You" (Lynn)
8. "All or Nothing at All" (Sinatra and Lynn)
9. "One" (Bennett)
10. "My Kind of Town" (Sinatra and Bennett)
11. "I Honestly Love You" (Uggams)
12. "The Lady Is a Tramp" (Sinatra and Uggams)
13. "My Sweet Lady" (Denver)
14. "September Song" (Sinatra and Denver)
15. "Night and Day" (Sinatra)
16. "Everybody 'Ought to Be in Love"
17. "Put Your Dreams Away (For Another Day)"

== Reception ==
Bettelou Peterson from the Detroit Free Press said "there's nothing fancy about the show ... the assembled ladies and gentlemen sing minus the distractions of flashy sets, costumes, chorus line or chit-chat ... such a simple approach can't be used with many performers or with some kinds of music ... rock is notably absent in the hour; country is included". She complimented Sinatra and Bennett as showing "how two old pros can cover the deficiencies of the years with adroit phrasing and high style".

The Waterloo Courier also noted the absence of "chit-chat". They opined that "it is great popular music ... and each performer has a solo and team up with Sinatra on duets". They highlighted his duets with Natalie Cole and John Denver as being "memorable moments". Robert McLean from The Boston Globe was less forgiving, noting that Sinatra "is like an aging fastballer, is still in there pitching, but blazing speed has given way to slow curves and change-ups, which sometimes miss the mark ... the passage of time is painfully evident when a grayer, less paunchy Sinatra reaches for notes and misses, and skitters through tricky phrasing on his once throbbing hits".
