= Ball Boys =

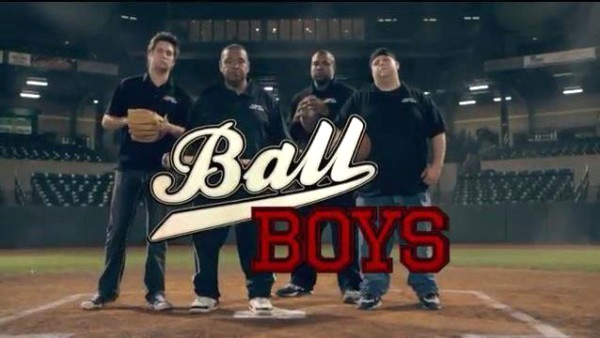
- Opening title
- Starring: Robbie Davis, Sr. Robbie Davis, Jr. Lou Brown; Robbie Reier
- Country of origin: United States
- No. of seasons: 1
- No. of episodes: 12

Production
- Executive producers: Brent Montgomery; David George; Shawn Witt
- Running time: 23 minutes
- Production company: Leftfield Pictures

Original release
- Network: ABC
- Release: March 24 – July 29, 2012

Ball Boys is an American reality television series that aired on ABC. The series premiered on March 24, 2012.

== Premise ==
The series is filmed in Lutherville, Maryland, where it chronicles the activities at Robbie's First Base, a family business operated by Robbie Davis, Sr. ("Senior") and his son, Robbie Davis, Jr. ("Junior"). Assisting them is Robbie Reier ("Shaggy"), who's very knowledgeable in sports history; and Lewis "Sweet Lou" Brown, a longtime employee who's not too bright. The show features various sports memorabilia experts from around the United States who make appearances on the show to let the guys at the shop know whether the items they are being offered are real or fake and what the actual value of these historic treasures are worth. Noted experts such as Richard Albersheim of Albersheim's (Las Vegas, NV) and Troy Kinunen of MEARS (Milwaukee, WI) are amongst the noted experts who help them out.

== Episodes ==
No.	Title	Original release date
1	"Lord of the Ring"	March 24, 2012
2	"Take Your Base"	March 24, 2012
3	"Strike it Rich"	March 31, 2012
4	"Shirts & 'Skins'"	March 31, 2012
5	"Stadium Dirt"	April 7, 2012
6	"Place Your Bats"	April 14, 2012
7	"High Flyers"	April 21, 2012
8	"The Book of Ruth"	May 12, 2012
9	"Don't Hassle the HOF"	June 2, 2012
10	"The Greatest"	June 9, 2012
11	"The Art of the Sale"	June 10, 2012
12	"The Perfect Season"	June 17, 2012
