= SpeakOUT (Boston) =

LGBT organisation in Boston

Public Education Services, Inc. d/b/a SpeakOUT
- Formation: February 28, 1972
- Type: 501(c)(3) nonprofit organization
- Tax ID no.: 04-2679788
- Headquarters: Jamaica Plain, Massachusetts
- Executive Director: Ellyn Ruthstrom
- Staff: 1 (2015)
- Volunteers: 100+ (2015)
- Website: www.speakoutboston.org
- Formerly called: Gay Speakers Bureau (GSB); Gay & Lesbian Speakers Bureau (GLSB); Gay, Lesbian & Bisexual Speakers Bureau (GLBSB)

SpeakOUT describes itself as "the nation's first LGBTQIA speakers bureau".

== History ==
Founded in Boston as a co-ed speakers' bureau in 1972 by men from the Boston Homophile Union and women from the Daughters of Bilitis, including Gay Community News founder David Peterson, SpeakOUT continues to this day as a not-for-profit volunteer speakers bureau. The organization sends speakers to schools from grade school to grad school, churches, synagogues, business groups, service organizations, and community groups. Approximately twice a year, they hold a weekend training for new speakers.

The organization is incorporated in Massachusetts as Public Educations Services, Inc., and their Doing-Business-As name has changed over the years. Founded as the "Gay Speakers' Bureau" in the 1980s, it was changed to the Gay & Lesbian Speakers' Bureau. In the 1990s, it was changed again to the Gay, Lesbian & Bisexual Speakers' Bureau, and in the 2000s, it was shortened to "SpeakOUT". In 2014, Ellyn Ruthstrom was hired as their Executive Director, and in the following year, Ruthstrom was selected to be one of the Pride Marshals for Boston Pride.

== Press ==
- "Speaking OUT and Proud at Gordon College", Bay Windows, Vol. 34, No. 11, 18-Feb-2016
- "SpeakOUT Boston: LGBTQIA at Harvard Divinity"
