= Boston Med =

- Genre: Documentary
- Theme music composer: Matthew Puckett
- Opening theme: Everything I Want
- Country of origin: United States
- Original language: English
- No. of seasons: 1
- No. of episodes: 8

Production
- Executive producers: Rudy Bednar; Terence Wrong
- Producers: Erica Baumgart, Monica DelaRosa, Brian Flatley, Andy Genovese, Sarah Namias
- Editors: Pagan Harleman, Faith Jones, Cindy Kaplan Rooney
- Running time: 42 minutes
- Production company: ABC News

Original release
- Network: ABC
- Release: June 24 – August 12, 2010

Related
- Hopkins; NY Med

Boston Med is an eight-part documentary television series that premiered on ABC in the United States on June 24, 2010. It follows the stories of doctors, nurses, patients and their families at Mass General, Brigham and Women's and Children's. The series was filmed over a four-month period, and edited for a year before airing. It is produced by ABC News with assistance from local ABC affiliate WCVB.

== Synopsis ==
The series follows the professional and personal lives of the doctors and nurses working in three of Boston's best hospitals: Brigham & Women's, Children's Hospital Boston, and Massachusetts General Hospital.

An episode follows the doctors' and nurses' struggles with their personal life and how to save their patients.

== Reception ==
Boston Med is scored 87 out of 100 on the review aggregator website Metacritic based on 14 critical reviews, which the site describes as "universal acclaim".

The series was nominated for and won several awards:

- 2011 Emmy for Outstanding Editing (Nominated)
- 2012 CINE Special Jury Award
- 2012 CINE Golden Eagle Award
- 2012 CINE Master Series Award candidate
- 2011 The Donate Life Hollywood Inspire Awards
