= Hopkins (TV series) =

- Genre: Documentary
- Starring: Alfredo Quiñones-Hinojosa, Avedis Meneshian, Megan Quick, Brian Bethea, Ann Czarnik, Amber Bethea, Karen Boyle, John Conte, Ashish S. Shah, James Fackler, Tom Reifsnyder, Robert Montgomery, Mustapha Saheed, Ben Carson, Luca Vricella, Andrew MacGregor Cameron
- Country of origin: United States
- Original language: English
- No. of seasons: 1
- No. of episodes: 7

Production
- Executive producers: Rudy Bednar; Terence Wrong
- Editors: Pagan Harleman, Faith Jones, Cindy Kaplan Rooney, Valentine D'Arcy Sheldon
- Running time: 43 minutes
- Production company: ABC News

Original release
- Network: ABC
- Release: June 26 – August 7, 2008

Related
- Hopkins 24/7; Boston Med; NY Med

Hopkins is a seven-part American documentary television series set at the Johns Hopkins Hospital, a teaching hospital in Baltimore, Maryland. It premiered in the United States on June 26, 2008, on ABC and is currently airing in syndication on the We TV Network. The theme for the show "So Much to Say" was written by songwriter Matthew Puckett. The series won a Peabody Award in 2009.

Created as a real-life adjunct to the ABC medical drama Grey's Anatomy, it follows the professional lives of hospital caregivers and their patients. The show is a follow-up to the ABC documentary series Hopkins 24/7, from 2000. Boston Med, which aired on ABC in June–August 2010, was produced by the same team behind Hopkins.

== Controversy ==
The fourth episode of the series featured a young boy with a serious, irreversible heart condition. His heart was barely functioning at a level high enough to keep him alive, and he went into cardiac arrest during a heart biopsy. During a discussion among the boy's doctors about the course of treatment, Dr. James Fackler, a pediatric critical care specialist, was shown saying, "It's my opinion that we should just let the child die." This comment incited controversy among viewers, who considered it insensitive.

In a video on ABC's Hopkins website, Dr. Fackler elaborated on what he meant, explaining that if the boy required a heart transplant, mechanical life support (ECMO) would not keep him alive long enough for a new heart to become available.

The series failed to show the importance of hospital positions other than the main physician. Nurses felt their jobs were undermined because of how doctors were portrayed as lone heroes. Nurses, social workers and clergy were some of the many people who contributed to the doctor's success.
