= NY Med =

- Genre: Documentary
- Theme music composer: Matthew Puckett
- Opening theme: Skyline
- Country of origin: United States
- Original language: English
- No. of seasons: 2
- No. of episodes: 16

Production
- Executive producer: Terence Wrong
- Producer: Monica DelaRosa
- Running time: 42 minutes
- Production company: ABC News

Original release
- Network: ABC
- Release: July 10, 2012 – August 14, 2014

Related
- Boston Med; Hopkins

NY Med is a medical documentary series which premiered on ABC on July 10, 2012. It follows the medical staff and patients of Columbia University Medical Center, Weill Cornell Medical Center, and Morgan Stanley Children's Hospital (all three are parts of NewYork–Presbyterian Hospital in New York City) as well as NYU Lutheran Medical Center in Brooklyn, New York. The series is produced by ABC News. A second season of NY Med premiered on June 26, 2014, which also includes University Hospital in Newark, New Jersey and St. Luke's-Roosevelt Hospital.

== Episodes ==
Season	Episodes	Originally released	
Season	Episodes	First released	Last released
1	8	July 10, 2012	August 22, 2012
2	8	June 26, 2014	August 14, 2014

=== Season 1 (2012) ===
No. overall	No. in season	Original release date	U.S. viewers (millions)
1	1	July 10, 2012	5.47
2	2	July 17, 2012	4.82
3	3	July 24, 2012	4.39
4	4	July 31, 2012	2.88
5	5	August 7, 2012	2.85
6	6	August 14, 2012	4.27
7	7	August 21, 2012	4.13
8	8	August 22, 2012	4.45

=== Season 2 (2014) ===
No. overall	No. in season	Original release date	U.S. viewers (millions)
9	1	June 26, 2014	5.62
10	2	July 3, 2014	4.73
11	3	July 10, 2014	5.34
12	4	July 17, 2014	5.29
13	5	July 24, 2014	5.17
14	6	July 31, 2014	5.62
15	7	August 7, 2014	4.99
16	8	August 14, 2014	4.97

== Critical reception ==
NY Med received "universal acclaim" based on an aggregate score of 84 out of 100 from six critics on Metacritic. Verne Gay of Newsday called the series "beautiful and moving," adding "NY Med brings it all home with power, beauty, insight and a degree of emotion that's an occasional sharp uppercut to the jaw." New York Magazine's Matt Zoller Seitz said the series "is filled with warm, honest moments like this — some poignant, others comic — and characters who would be plenty compelling even if they didn't keep revealing surprising new sides." Mary McNamara of the Los Angeles Times called the series "surprisingly addictive", adding "NY Med appears less self-conscious about its medical pedigree than its predecessors, more willing to embrace the dramatic pacing and elasticities of television." The New York Times' Mike Hale thought the series was "predictably absorbing" but added "NY Med and its predecessors have an interesting, though certainly unintentional, effect: The intense focus on the heroics of the nurses and doctors can make the patients look just as helpless and pathetic as we fear we will be when our day in the ward comes."

== Patient privacy lawsuit ==
One episode of NY Med depicted the case of an elderly man, Mark Chanko, who arrived at NewYork–Presbyterian hospital after he was hit by a garbage truck. The episode showed Chanko's final moments as he died from his injuries. While his face was blurred, Chanko's widow was able to identify him when she watched the episode. The patient's family had not granted ABC or the hospital permission to film his treatment, and they were deeply upset by the episode. The family sued ABC and New York–Presbyterian Hospital for violating Mark Chanko's privacy. The case was dismissed by an appellate court. However, the family appealed and the NY judiciary felt there was sufficient reason to bring it before the state's highest appellate court. New York–Presbyterian agreed to a $2.2M settlement with the Department of Health and Human Services, Office for Civil Rights, who investigated this as a HIPAA violation. ABC removed the segment from the DVD version of the episode and from future broadcasts.
