= 2014 in American television =

In American television in 2014, notable events included television show debuts, finales, and cancellations; channel launches, closures, and rebrandings; stations changing or adding their network affiliations; and information about changes of ownership of channels or stations, controversies and carriage disputes.

== Events ==
=== January ===
Date	Event
1	Time Warner Cable President/COO Robert Marcus becomes the company's new CEO, succeeding the retiring Glenn Britt.
1	One year to the day after being dropped from Time Warner Cable and Bright House Networks systems, Ovation returns to the two providers, the result of Ovation's announced commitment to provide more original programming.
1	Home shopping network ShopNBC rebrands as ShopHQ.
1	Fox owned-and-operated station WJZY/Charlotte, North Carolina, launches its news department with the debut of an hour-long 10 pm newscast. The program soft-launched on December 18, 2013, in the form of an online-only rehearsal newscast that was streamed on the station's website until WJZY's news share agreement with CBS affiliate WBTV to produce its primetime newscast ended.
1	Sinclair-controlled ABC affiliate WHAM-TV/Rochester begins producing morning and 10 pm newscasts for its Fox-affiliated sister station WUHF. The setup comes after the termination of an eight-year shared services agreement at the end of 2013 with Nexstar-owned WROC-TV, which saw WROC produce news content for WUHF. Sinclair's duopoly partner, Deerfield Media, acquired WHAM-TV from Newport Television in December 2012.
2	Hearst Corporation announces that David Barrett, CEO of its television station division, has ceded day-to-day oversight to the division's President/COO, Jordan Wertleib. Barrett remains on Hearst's board of trustees.
5	The fourth-season premiere of Downton Abbey makes history for PBS, with more than 10.2 million viewers tuning in, making it the highest rated program in the network's 44-year history.
6	ABC begins limiting online access to day-after streaming of its series' new episodes to customers of participating cable providers, Hulu Plus, iTunes, and Amazon Video and restricting free access to recent episodes on its website and streaming app to other users eight days after an episode's original airdate. Similar streaming restrictions are also put in place by sister cable channel ABC Family, which launched its "Watch ABC Family" authenticated streaming service on that same day.
6	Doctor Television Channel (also known as DrTV), a new network dedicated to healthy-lifestyle programming, officially launches on several low-power television stations and on Roku.
6	One year after adding the omg! to its name (the result of a partnership with Yahoo!'s similarly titled website), the CBS-syndicated entertainment/gossip program omg! Insider sees its title revert to just The Insider in line with omg!'s rebranding as Yahoo! Celebrity; the two entities continue to promote and share each other's content.
11	CBS Sports NFL analyst Dan Dierdorf calls his final game, an AFC Divisional Playoff game between the Indianapolis Colts and New England Patriots, ending a three-decade career as an analyst spent with CBS and ABC's Monday Night Football.
12	NBC's telecast of the 71st Golden Globe Awards is watched by an estimated 20.9 million people, the event's best ratings in 10 years.
13	A scene in this evening's episode of How I Met Your Mother features members of the all-white main cast in yellow face and depicting Asian stereotypes and accents. It proves to be a controversial scene, and prompts series creator/producer Carter Bays to apologize on Twitter on January 15, explaining that it was meant to pay homage to the Kung fu movies they grew up on.
14	DirecTV removes The Weather Channel due to an unresolved carriage dispute, with the carrier filling the void with a simulcast of digital broadcast network WeatherNation TV. The dispute runs until April 8, when DirecTV and The Weather Channel reach a new carriage deal. The channel, in a trade-off to regain carriage, agrees to pare down its weekday reality content and devote more of its daytime schedule to forecasts and weather reportage.
15	On Law & Order: Special Victims Unit, Captain Donald Cragen (Dann Florek) retires from the NYPD, leaving Detective/Sergeant Olivia Benson (Mariska Hargitay) as the only remaining character who has appeared on the series for its entire fifteen-season run.
18	Sasheer Zamata joins the cast of Saturday Night Live, becoming the show's first black female cast member in six years. Zamata's hiring, along with the addition of two other black women to its writing staff (Leslie Jones and LaKendra Tookes), come after SNL had received criticism in 2013 for a lack of African-American women among its cast.
26	NBC airs the 2014 NFL Pro Bowl, likely the last Pro Bowl game to air on broadcast television for the next few years. ESPN will take over exclusive rights to the Pro Bowl and Monday Night Football from 2015 through 2022.
26	The 56th Annual Grammy Awards airs on CBS. It is the first time the ceremony has been held in January (in part to avoid scheduling conflicts with the 2014 Winter Olympics in February) and is marked by major wins for Daft Punk, Pharrell Williams, Lorde. Nine Inch Nails frontman Trent Reznor later blasted the producers and CBS on Twitter for cutting off the band's closing performance featuring Queens of the Stone Age, Dave Grohl and Lindsey Buckingham.
27	How I Met Your Mother marks its 200th episode with a twist: rather than being told from Ted Mosby's point of view, it is instead told from the perspective of "The Mother" (Cristin Milioti), whose eight years prior to meeting Ted are recalled in a story complete with special opening credits.
27	NBC Sports hires Lindsey Vonn as their correspondent for the network's coverage of the 2014 Winter Games and as a contributor on Today during its broadcast from Sochi. The skier was supposed to compete in the events, but a series of injuries resulted in Vonn withdrawing from the Games earlier this month.
28	For the first time ever, four different televised Republican responses followed the State of the Union Address by Democratic President Barack Obama.
28	Moments after the State of the Union Address was completed, United States Congressman Michael Grimm (R-New York's 11th), threatened NY1 reporter Michael Scotto by attacking him and telling Scotto that he'll throw him off the balcony of the United States Capitol building after Scotto approached the Tea Party-backed representative to ask about a continuing federal investigation into his campaign fund-raising while the cameras were still rolling (Grimm would later be indicted in April). Grimm later apologized to his district and to NY1 for his actions.
28	During a live remote from the College of Charleston, a man lunges at The Weather Channel meteorologist Jim Cantore, who fends off the attacker with a knee to the groin and finishes his report.
29	For the first time in 19 years, Bob Saget, John Stamos and Dave Coulier reprise their Full House roles and appear on Late Night to give Jimmy Fallon a sappy, heartfelt speech to calm his anxiety about hosting The Tonight Show.

=== February ===
Date	Event
2	The Seattle Seahawks defeat the Denver Broncos 43–8 to win Super Bowl XLVIII, the franchise's first championship, an event watched by 111.5 million viewers. It is the fourth time since 2010 that the NFL's championship game sets the all-time total viewership record.
3	GetTV commences programming. The Sony Pictures Entertainment-owned digital network, which primarily airs feature films from Sony's film library, launches in 25 markets, airing mainly on subchannels of Univision Communications-owned stations.
3	In the ramp-up of WGN America's rebranding as a general cable network rather than a superstation, WGN America drops the 9 pm (Central Time) nightly newscast of WGN-TV/Chicago as well as the station's broadcast of Illinois Lottery drawings, including the multi-state Mega Millions and Powerball drawings. Likely due to contractual issues, the channel now broadcasts the 4 am (Central Time) hour of the WGN Morning News on weekdays as a replacement.
4	The National Football League awards its Thursday Night Football package to CBS, which will produce 16 Thursday and Saturday night games in 2014 (with a league option for 2015). Eight early-season games will air on CBS and be simulcast on NFL Network (which has carried the package since 2006), while NFLN will air eight late-season games exclusively. CBS' lead NFL team of Jim Nantz and Phil Simms will call the games, while NFLN personalities will host pre-game, halftime, and post-game shows.
6	Coverage of the 2014 Winter Olympics begins on NBC, with the network and its cable channels airing coverage through February 23.
6	After 22 years, Jay Leno steps down as host of The Tonight Show. It is Leno's second departure from Tonight (the first being his departure in 2009 and his controversial return in 2010), and his final show features guests Billy Crystal (Leno's first Tonight guest in 1992) and Garth Brooks.
9	On the 50th anniversary of The Beatles' debut performance on The Ed Sullivan Show, CBS marks the occasion with a concert special, featuring performances by modern-day artists such as Katy Perry and Maroon 5, plus an interview with surviving Beatles Paul McCartney and Ringo Starr by David Letterman, whose Late Show presently occupies Ed Sullivan's former studio.
10	WeatherNation and DirecTV introduce a series of new weather services, including "Local Weather Now", which allows subscribers to view information pertinent to their area.
10	Ion Media Networks converts St. Louis' MyNetworkTV affiliate WRBU/East St. Louis, Illinois, and CW affiliate WZRB/Columbia, South Carolina, to Ion Television owned-and-operated stations. While all programming on WRBU is switched to Ion, WZRB continues to run CW programming in its regular time slots while a new affiliate is found, the first time Ion runs a CW affiliate. Both affiliations eventually find new homes when MyNetworkTV affiliate WKTC/Sumter, South Carolina, takes the Columbia market's CW affiliation on March 17, and CBS affiliate KMOV/St. Louis relaunches its DT3 subchannel as a MyNetworkTV affiliate on November 17.
13	Time Warner Cable announces it intends to be acquired by Comcast in a $45.2 billion deal, which is subject to approval by federal regulators and is expected to face scrutiny from media watchdogs and rival operators.
14	Hoak Media announces it will sell CBS affiliate KAUZ-TV/Wichita Falls, Texas, to KAUZ Media, Inc. (owned by Lawton, Oklahoma-based lawyer Bill W. Burgess, Jr.). Under the agreement, Drewry Communications Group (owners of ABC affiliate KSWO-TV in nearby Lawton) will continue to operate KAUZ under joint sales and shared services agreements.
17	Will Smith and U2 are the guests as Jimmy Fallon becomes the new host of The Tonight Show, which originates from the same studio (Studio 6B at NBC's New York studios) where the show originated until moving to the West Coast in May 1972. The premiere also includes a long line of surprise cameos, among them Joan Rivers, whose appearance marks her first time on Tonight since being blacklisted from the program in 1986 by then-host Johnny Carson after she joined Fox's The Late Show.
17	An average audience of 23.5 million viewers watch Davis and White win gold at the 2014 Winter Olympics skating to Rimsky-Korsakov's Scheherazade.
24	WWE launches WWE Network, a premium subscription Internet television channel featuring new and archived events.
24	Seth Meyers takes over as host of Late Night, with his premiere guests Amy Poehler, Vice-President Joe Biden, and A Great Big World. Meyers is the third consecutive Saturday Night Live alumnus (after Jimmy Fallon and Conan O'Brien) to host the show. The show's new bandleader, Fred Armisen, is also an SNL veteran.
28	21st Century Fox acquires majority ownership in YES Network, increasing its stake in the New York City sports channel from 49% to 80% (Yankee Global Enterprises, parent company of the New York Yankees, owns the remaining 20%).

=== March ===
Date	Event
1	Saturday Night Live writer Colin Jost becomes the new co-anchor of the show's Weekend Update segment alongside Cecily Strong.
2	The 86th Academy Awards airs on ABC, attracting an average audience of 43.7 million viewers, the event's largest audience since 2000. The host of the ceremony, Ellen DeGeneres, urges viewers to tweet the Oscar selfie in order to make the picture the most re-tweeted tweet in history, which is accomplished before the broadcast is over at over 2 million retweets.
3	Discovery Communications rebrands Military Channel as American Heroes Channel to focus on "history-based, narrative-style documentary programming".
3	The Walt Disney Company and Dish Network announce a retransmission deal for Disney-owned networks (including new-to-Dish channels such as Disney Junior and Fusion), ABC O&O stations, and related digital platforms to appear on Dish systems and TV Everywhere mobile apps, plus the return of HD simulcast networks removed in a 2010 dispute over Dish's 'free HD for life' promotion. A caveat of the deal is the altering of Dish's Hopper DVR system to prevent commercial skipping of Disney programming for a 72-hour window (within ACNielsen's "Live +3" ratings metric) after a program's original airing. In return, Disney agrees to drop its legal action against Dish regarding Hopper.
5	Saying she cannot be part of a network that "whitewashes the actions" of Russian President Vladimir Putin, Washington-based anchor Liz Wahl resigns on-air from the Russian government-backed news channel RT at the end of her newscast. Wahl's departure comes one day after colleague Abby Martin closed an episode of her Breaking the Set by declaring her opposition to Russia's intervention in Ukraine.
5	Chambers Communications Corporation announces its exit from broadcasting with the sale of its three remaining stations – Oregon stations KEZI/Eugene, KDRV/Medford, and KDKF/Klamath Falls – to Heartland Media in a $30 million deal.
6	President and COO of the Cartoon Network division of Turner Broadcasting Stuart Snyder steps down as part of several executive changes at the network since John Martin became the chairman of Turner Broadcasting in January. Snyder had been known for an attempt to branch the network into reality television programming in 2009.
12	Post-Newsweek Stations announces its intent to sell ABC affiliate WPLG/Miami to Berkshire Hathaway in a cash and stock deal in which the latter company (founded by Warren Buffett) will significantly reduce its stake in Post-Newsweek parent Graham Holdings Company through a trade of an undisclosed amount of shares in Berkshire Hathaway currently held by Graham, which will receive 1.6 million shares of Class B common stock in Graham Holdings owned by Berkshire Hathaway. In a memo to Post-Newsweek employees, president and CEO Emily Barr stated that the group's remaining five stations would not be sold.
12	The FCC Media Bureau releases a notice that it would further scrutinize television station transactions which include sharing agreements (in the form of joint sales, shared services and local marketing agreements), especially those that include an option to purchase the junior partner in the agreement outright.
12	CBS announces that it has given another three-season renewal to its top-rated sitcom The Big Bang Theory, extending the series' run into the 2016–17 television season.
13	Nexstar Broadcasting Group announces that it will purchase digital media company Internet Broadcasting from an ownership group that includes Hearst Television and Post-Newsweek Stations for $20 million.
18	A news helicopter belonging to ABC affiliate KOMO-TV/Seattle crashes on top of three cars at the Seattle Center after taking off from the station's Fisher Plaza studios, killing pilot Gary Pfitzner and photographer Bill Strothman on board, and critically injuring a 37-year-old man on the ground who suffered severe burns. The helicopter had been leased to KOMO by Helicopters, Inc. while its own helicopter was undergoing technical upgrades, and had previously been used by CBS-owned WBZ-TV and WSBK-TV, and Fox-owned WFXT/Boston until 2013.
18	Glee marks its 100th episode with a two-part episode, with the second part airing on March 25, 2014, and features the apparent end of New Directions after the club is shut down by principal Sue Sylvester (portrayed by Jane Lynch). Many graduates of the glee club return, as do special guest stars Kristin Chenoweth as April Rhodes and Gwyneth Paltrow as Holly Holliday.
19	On Wheel of Fortune, 25-year old Emil De Leon solved the bonus puzzle "New Baby Buggy" with only the first two letters showing for $45,000, with his appearance made headlines on the solve and went viral in YouTube. Host Pat Sajak dubbed this solve 'amazing' in the show's 30-years history.
20	Sinclair Broadcast Group restructures its acquisition of Allbritton Communications in order to address ownership conflicts noted in a December 2013 FCC review of the deal (originally announced in August 2013). Sinclair will sell CBS affiliate WHP-TV/Harrisburg (in order to acquire ABC affiliate WHTM-TV) and MyNetworkTV affiliates WMMP/Charleston and WABM/Birmingham (in order to acquire ABC affiliates WCIV and WBMA-LD/WCFT-TV/WJSU-TV, creating a duopoly between the latter and CW affiliate WTTO), opting not to enter into any operational or financial agreements with the buyers of those stations. Sinclair would also terminate a shared services agreement with Charleston Fox affiliate WTAT (to which owner and longtime Sinclair SSA partner Cunningham Broadcasting would assume operations outright), give the buyer of WHP-TV the rights to an existing local marketing agreement with Harrisburg CW affiliate WLYH-TV, and seek a license, programming and transmitter asset swap between WHTM and the buyer of WHP.
21	LIN Media and Media General announce that the two companies will merge in a $1.6 billion deal that will create the second largest television station group in the United States with 74 stations in 46 television markets. Due to planned changes in FCC ownership rules regarding same-market television stations, Media General and LIN plan to divest or swap stations that each company owns in five markets: Birmingham (WVTM-TV and WIAT), Green Bay (WBAY-TV, WLUK-TV and WCWF), Mobile (WKRG-TV, WALA-TV and WFNA), Providence (WPRI-TV, WJAR and WNAC-TV) and Savannah (WSAV-TV, WJCL and WTGS).
23	In a plot development that had been kept under wraps until the episode's airtime, attorney Will Gardner (series regular Josh Charles) is shot and killed in the courtroom by his client in The Good Wife episode "Dramatics, Your Honor".
24	Frontier Radio Management sells Fox/ABC affiliate WGXA/Macon, Georgia, to the Sinclair Broadcast Group for $33 million (although the deal occurred on this date, it was not formally announced until the April 29 release of the purchase filing by the Federal Communications Commission).
25	Chuck Scarborough celebrates his 40th anniversary as the anchor for WNBC/New York City.
26	TV Land's Hot in Cleveland and The Soul Man kick off their season premieres (Hot in Cleveland's fifth and The Soul Man's third) with live episodes. This was the second live episode for the former, which will also introduce its first animated episode this season.
28	The Colbert Report comes under fire after posting a message on its Twitter account mocking Asian stereotypes (using a quote from a March 27 episode in reference to a piece on the creation of the Washington Redskins Original Americans Foundation, pointing out the hypocrisy of using an ethnic slur aimed at Native Americans in the non-profit's name), with some users calling for an end to the show with the hashtag #CancelColbert. Colbert's network Comedy Central takes responsibility for the tweet, saying neither Stephen Colbert nor his staff had anything to do with what was written. The account @ColbertReport was later deleted with the account 'blown up' ceremonially during an interview with Twitter founder Biz Stone, with all show-related tweets being directed to Colbert's personal Twitter account.
28	Piers Morgan ends his Piers Morgan Live show, three years after Morgan succeeded longtime network personality Larry King in the 9 pm ET hour.
30	Anchor Josh Elliott leaves Good Morning America after three years to become a correspondent for NBC Sports. Elliot was succeeded in his former role at GMA by Amy Robach.
31	In a 3–2 vote, the Federal Communications Commission votes to ban joint sales agreements, making them attributable to FCC ownership limits if the senior partner sells 15% or more of the advertising time of a competing junior partner station in the JSA. The ruling will apply to both pending station transactions, as well as existing JSAs, giving a grace period of two years for such agreements to be unwound. The commission also votes to prohibit broadcasters from coordinating retransmission consent negotiations involving two of the four highest-rated stations in a single television market.
31	Adult Swim expands its programming by claiming an hour from Cartoon Network (the two channels occupy the same channel space) and running nightly from 8 pm to 6 am (ET). This marks the second expansion into an earlier evening timeslot for Adult Swim, which began airing at 9 pm (ET) in December 2010.

=== April ===
Date	Event
1	Fourteen Viacom-owned cable networks (including MTV, Nickelodeon, Comedy Central, Spike and TV Land) were removed for several hours from most of the 850 small cable providers represented by the National Cable Television Cooperative, after Viacom and the providers fail to reach a new contract before the 12:01 pm Eastern Time expiration of the media company's prior agreement with the NCTC. The affected networks were restored later that day, after the two parties reached a new carriage agreement.
1	For an April Fools' Day joke, Craig Ferguson and Drew Carey trade places as hosts of their respective CBS shows: Ferguson subs for Carey on The Price is Right, accompanied by The Late Late Show announcer Shadoe Stevens, sidekick Geoff Peterson and pantomime horse Secretariat. Carey returns the favor by guest hosting Late Late, with Price announcer George Gray and models Rachel Reynolds, Manuela Arbeláez and Amber Lancaster alongside.
4	The Madison Square Garden Company announces it will sell its music channel Fuse to SiTV Media, owner of the Hispanic-targeted NuvoTV, in a $226 million deal.
4	NBCUniversal ceases the operations of the satirical television review website Television Without Pity and will shut down the site's message board and forums on May 31 after the company failed to find a buyer, stating that TWoP is no longer "a viable businesses for our company". The website, which was launched in 1998 as a blog devoted to analyzing Dawson's Creek before changing its name in 2002, was acquired by NBC Universal in 2007.
6	At WrestleMania XXX in New Orleans, Louisiana, Brock Lesnar defeats the Undertaker ending his 21 match undefeated streak at the event. In the main event Daniel Bryan wins a triple threat match for the WWE World Heavyweight Championship defeating Batista and Randy Orton in the main event. In attendance is 8-year old Connor Michalek who is at ringside at the event Michalek dies 19 days later of a brain tumor. Cesaro wins the inaugural André The Giant Memorial Battle Royal last eliminating Big Show.
7	The Ultimate Warrior makes what turns out to be his final public appearance (one day before his death from a heart attack at the age of 54) on WWE Raw. In his first appearance on the USA Network show since his final WWE TV match in 1996, Warrior gives a speech to the fans and wrestlers past and present as his Ultimate Warrior character.
8	Around 10 pm ET, Dish Network removes Hearst Television-owned stations in more than 20 markets after the broadcasting group and satellite provider fail to renew a carriage agreement due to disagreements on retransmission consent payments. The stations were restored 14 hours later, after a new agreement was struck between Dish and Hearst.
8	WWE legend The Ultimate Warrior dies of a heart attack in Scottsdale at the age of 54 one day after his final appearance on Monday Night Raw.
15	Trans-America Broadcasting, the owners of MyNetworkTV outlet KAIL/Fresno, restructures its operations and changes its name to Tel-America North Corporation. The move comes as a result of Trans-America's announced sale of its sole radio outlet KTYM/Los Angeles to Immaculate Heart Radio on the same day of the restructuring. KAIL will continue on as the newly formed company's sole property.
16	It is announced that WMGM-TV in Wildwood, New Jersey, will disaffiliate from NBC at the end of the year, due to NBC claiming market exclusivity for its owned-and-operated station in Philadelphia, WCAU. On December 31, WMGM-TV switched its affiliation to the Soul of the South Network on an interim basis, while former owners Access.1 Communications (who had operated WMGM-TV under a management agreement with LocusPoint Networks) retained most of the former WMGM-TV staff, including its news department, for future plans.
20	The historical drama Salem makes its debut on WGN America, becoming the first scripted series produced exclusively for the Tribune Broadcasting-owned cable/satellite network. The show's debut also marks the Chicago-based superstation's transition into a conventional general entertainment network.
21	CBS affiliate WJMN-TV/Marquette, Michigan (which operates as a semi-satellite of WFRV-TV/Green Bay, Wisconsin) launches an in-house news operation with two weeknight-only newscasts at 6 and 11 pm. This marks the first time since its launch in 1968 that the station has aired its own local newscasts. The move comes almost three years after owner Nexstar Broadcasting Group (which purchased WJMN and WFRV in 2011) announced plans to establish some form of separate news department for WJMN, which had been simulcasting WFRV's newscasts with Upper Peninsula-focused weather cut-ins inserted into the broadcasts.
21	Supply chain professional Julia Collins debuted on Jeopardy! begins her 21-game run as one of the most dominant players in the game show's history. Between her run from April 21 to June 2 (except for May 5 to 16), Collins accumulated $428,100 from the 20 games which holds the record for its longest streak and cash winnings total for a female Jeopardy! contestant; currently she hold the third-longest winnings streak overall (surpassing David Madden's 19-win streak, but behind James Holzhauer's 32 and Ken Jennings's 74). She was currently the ninth-largest winner in the show (and fourth largest winner in regular play, behind Madden, Holzhauer and Jennings). Collins was later invited in the 2014 Jeopardy! Tournament of Champions (held on November) where she finished third overall, winning an additional $50,000.
23	MyNetworkTV/Cozi TV affiliate WRDE-LD in Rehoboth Beach, Delaware, announces that it will become an NBC affiliate in June, giving the Delmarva Peninsula market not only its first full-time NBC affiliate, but also its first network affiliate based in Delaware. The affiliation agreement (which also gives the Delmarva Peninsula in-market affiliates of all four major commercial networks) culminates an endeavor which began two years ago when WRDE-LD owner Bob Backman complained to NBCUniversal about the lack of local news coverage from the default NBC affiliates then serving the area. Concurrent with the move, WRDE-LD commissions the Independent News Network to produce 6 and 11 pm newscasts for the station. WRDE-LD's former affiliations with MyNetworkTV and Cozi TV move to a new shared DT2 subchannel with the change.
27	In the fallout of revelations of a leaked tape from TMZ in which Los Angeles Clippers owner Donald Sterling made alleged racially offensive comments in front of his biracial mistress after she took Instagram photos of minorities that he asked her to remove, the team entered the Oracle Arena in Oakland, California, for their fourth game in the 2014 NBA Playoffs against the Golden State Warriors with their warmup shirts and jackets turned inside out as protest against Sterling during its telecast on ABC. The Clippers would lose to the Warriors 118–97. The following day, a number of major companies including Kia Motors (whose television spokesperson is Clippers player Blake Griffin), State Farm Insurance, and Virgin America, announced that they would no longer serve as sponsors for the Clippers, including their television broadcasts. On April 29, the NBA, upon confirming the taped conversations, announced that Sterling has been banned for life and fined $2.5 million. After that announcement was made, the 15 companies that withdrew their media sponsorship announced that it would either return or look at renewing its deal pending the outcome of the franchise's future that was outlined by NBA commissioner Adam Silver.
27	Charter Communications announces they will buy some of Comcast's divested assets, meaning customers affected will be switched from Comcast service to Charter.

=== May ===
Date	Event
1	Gray Television announces that it is purchasing six Fox-affiliated outlets in the Dakotas, with the acquisition of assets of KNDX/Bismarck and its satellite sisters KXND/Minot and two LPTVs from Prime Cities Broadcasting, Inc., which Gray will operate under a LMA, while at the same time closes on its purchase of KEVN-TV/Rapid City and satellite sister KIVV/Lead from Mission TV LLC.
2	MGM Television launches the general entertainment digital multicast network The Works, with stations owned or operated by Titan Broadcast Management as its charter affiliates. The network carries a mix of local and national news content, feature films from the Metro-Goldwyn-Mayer library, sports and comedy programming.
4	The Simpsons celebrates its 550th episode, and are transformed into Legos in the predominantly CG-animated episode "Brick Like Me".
7	NBC renews its broadcast rights to the Olympic Games in a $7.75 billion deal that will keep coverage of the winter and summer games on the network and its sister cable channels through 2032.
7	Gray Television announced that it is purchasing NBC affiliate KTVH/Helena from Intermountain West Communications Company. Gray also purchased Helena CW affiliate KMTF, which has long been operated by KTVH, through a failed station waiver. Gray will take over KTVH's operations through a local marketing agreement on June 1.
13	The studios of ABC affiliate WMAR-TV/Baltimore were evacuated after a man intentionally crashes a truck into the building's lobby. The Baltimore Police Department received a disturbance call before the crash regarding a man banging on the lobby door, trying to get into the building. The man was captured within the building by police just after 4:30 pm Eastern Time. No staffers inside the building were injured as a result of the incident. WMAR-TV ran an automated feed of ABC programming for five hours, before being taken off the air entirely late that afternoon until it established a satellite relay with Phoenix sister station KNXV-TV (both are owned by the E. W. Scripps Company) to restore its signal.
14	The Gannett Company will expand its broadcasting footprint in Texas when it purchases six television stations owned by the London Broadcasting Company – ABC affiliates KIII/Corpus Christi and KBMT/Beaumont, NBC affiliate KCEN-TV/Waco, CBS affiliate KYTX/Nacogdoches and Fox affiliates KXVA/Abilene and KIDY/San Angelo – for $215 million (the company had acquired ABC affiliates WFAA/Dallas and KVUE/Austin and CBS affiliates KHOU/Houston and KENS/San Antonio in 2013 as part of its acquisition with Belo). The deal gives Gannett its first Fox-affiliated stations with the acquisitions of KIDY and KXVA. As a result of its exemption from the deal, independent station KTXD-TV/Greenville and MeTV affiliate KCEB/Longview will become London's two remaining television properties.
16	Barbara Walters co-hosts The View for the final time, and is feted by ABC News that evening with a special two-hour career retrospective. Walters will remain with ABC as an occasional ABC News contributor as well as The View's executive producer. Walters has co-hosted the show since its debut in 1997.
16	Brad Rutter was crowned the winner of the Battle of the Decades on Jeopardy! by beating Ken Jennings and Roger Craig and winning $1,000,000 to become the biggest winner on Jeopardy!. To date, Rutter has won $4,455,102 on Jeopardy! and $100,000 more on Million Dollar Mind Game. Rutter held the title on becoming the biggest game show winner in the history of American television until on January 14, 2020, where Jennings won another Jeopardy! tournament, The Greatest of All Time and Jennings reclaimed the top position.
18	AT&T announces its intention to merge with DirecTV in a $48.5 billion deal that was approved by the boards of both companies in separate meetings. The terms of the deal includes AT&T paying about $95 a share in stock and cash. It is expected that the deal, as with the planned merger between Comcast and Time Warner Cable, will face major scrutiny from federal regulators and media watchgroups.
18	The 2014 telecast of the Billboard Music Awards on ABC posted its biggest numbers in 13 years, being watched by 10.5 million viewers, topping the 2013 telecast by 700,000 viewers to make it the most watched BBMAs since its 1989 inaugural broadcast.
19	NBC tests out The Maya Rudolph Show, a special that is aimed to revive the variety/musical series format that has not been seen on American television since the short-lived Wayne Brady Show in 2001, which could serve as a possible limited-run series or a series of specials. This was the first attempt in nearly six years by NBC to bring this concept back to television (its last successful series in this genre, Barbara Mandrell and the Mandrell Sisters, left the network's schedule in 1982), having struck out back in 2008 with Rosie Live. The special pulled in 7.23 million viewers in its 10 pm (ET/PT) timeslot, making it the third most watched program of the night.
20	Just three months after winning their gold medal in figure skating at the Winter Olympics in Sochi, Russia, Meryl Davis is crowned the 18th season winner of Dancing with the Stars. Charlie White, her figure skating partner, was eliminated on the ninth week of the season, finishing in 5th place.
21	Caleb Johnson wins the 13th season of American Idol.
23	Disney Channel launches a new logo and imaging campaign, the cable network's first major change to its appearance in twelve years, which is designed to be used with already-existing promotional advertising.
28	The 2014 edition of the World Music Awards, which had been scheduled to air on NBC after being recorded the night before in Monte Carlo, is abruptly pre-empted prior to its broadcast, replaced by a rebroadcast of the eighth-season premiere of Last Comic Standing due to what the WMA organizing body calls "technical issues". It was later revealed that Sharon Stone had pulled out as host last-minute due to a payment dispute with organizers, while delays during the taping of the show meant it would not make broadcast, and as of June 4, NBC still had not received 'final cut' from the producers. The World Music Awards had not been held since 2010, when it was last aired in the U.S. on MyNetworkTV.
29	Due to the Federal Communications Commission's recent ban on joint sales agreements and citing the inability to find buyers for stations that it tried to sell in the two markets, Sinclair Broadcast Group announced a proposal to relinquish the licenses of the three ABC affiliates that it planned to acquire in its purchase of Allbritton Communications, WCIV/Charleston, South Carolina, WCFT-TV/Tuscaloosa, Alabama, and WJSU-TV/Anniston, Alabama (the latter two of which simulcast low-power station WBMA-LD) to the FCC, and move ABC programming to the company's existing MyNetworkTV-affiliated stations in those markets, WABM and WMMP, in order to expedite approval of the deal.
30	Crain's Chicago Business reports plans by Tribune Company CEO Peter Liguori to phase out broadcasts of local Chicago sporting events on WGN America by January 2015 as part of the network's transition to basic cable from a superstation feed of WGN-TV, which has regularly aired games involving the Bulls, Cubs and White Sox nationwide since uplinking to satellite in 1978.

=== June ===
Date	Event
6	The Nexstar Broadcasting Group announces it will sell three Fox-affiliated stations – KMSS-TV/Shreveport, Louisiana, KPEJ-TV/Midland, Texas, and KLJB/Davenport, Iowa – to the Marshall Broadcasting Group for $58.5 million. The minority-owned Marshall intends to fund the acquisitions through borrowings guaranteed by Nexstar (which had intended to acquire the stations through its 2013 purchases of the Communications Corporation of America, White Knight Broadcasting and Grant Broadcasting System II), and plans to launch news operations and provide sports and minority-oriented public affairs programming, with Nexstar providing sales and certain non-programming services.
8	Actor/comedian Tracy Morgan (formerly of Saturday Night Live and 30 Rock) is critically injured and hospitalized in an intensive care unit after a six-car crash on the New Jersey Turnpike that injured three other people and killed comedian James McNair. Kevin Roper, the sleep deprived driver of the 18-wheel truck who caused the crash was charged with one count of death by auto and four counts of assault by auto. Morgan later sued the trucker's employer Walmart, claiming they "knew, or should have known" he was sleep deprived.
12	Coverage of the 2014 FIFA World Cup begins on ABC/ESPN (English-language), Univision (Spanish-language), and ESPN Deportes (Portuguese-language), running through July 12. It is the last FIFA championship event for those networks until at least 2023 (Fox Sports and Telemundo will begin an eight-year rights deal with FIFA in 2015).
12	A report in The Wall Street Journal reveals that Univision Communications has been in preliminary talks with CBS and Time Warner about a potential sale of the Spanish-language broadcaster. Univision's ownership, led by Saban Capital Group, are seeking at least $20 billion for the company.
13	Gray Television initiates a major shuffle of affiliations and stations in the wake of the new FCC rules disallowing joint sales agreements, in the states of Nebraska and North Dakota in the wake of the completion of its purchase of stations owned by Hoak Media. KHAS-TV, the NBC affiliate for central Nebraska, goes off the air at midnight, with their NBC affiliation and local programming moved to Gray's KSNB-TV. This in turn leads to its primary MyNetworkTV/MeTV affiliation being moved to their DT2 subchannel, while KHAS's Cozi TV and KSNB's Antenna TV subchannels are discontinued. In western and central North Dakota, the Fox affiliations previously held by KNDX/KXND in Bismarck and Minot are also moved to the DT2 subchannels of NBC affiliate KFYR-TV in Bismarck (and satellite stations KQCD/Dickinson, KMOT/Minot, and KUMV/Willison); along with the existing low-power repeaters KNDX-LD/Dickinson and KXND-LP/Williston, with the full-power KNDX and KXND signals also going off the air. The company later announces that it plans to move the CBS affiliation of KXJB-TV/Fargo to the DT2 sub channel of NBC affiliate KVLY and the ABC affiliations of KJCT/Grand Junction, Colorado, and KAQY/Monroe, Louisiana, to Gray's other operations in the same markets (NBC affiliate KKCO and CBS affiliate KNOE, respectively) as DT2 subchannels. The silent stations will then be spin off to minority interests pending approval from the FCC, which under this arrangement would allow the stations to continue operating on the conditions that it would continue serving the markets independently (under minority, female and/or non-profit ownership) and not make any partnerships or sharing arrangements with other broadcasters.
16	Cartoon Network announces it will reboot The Powerpuff Girls. The show, which features Amanda Leighton, Kristen Li, and Natalie Palamides as the new voices of Blossom, Bubbles, and Buttercup, respectively, would debut in April 2016.
18	Meredith Corporation announces it will purchase ABC affiliate WGGB/Springfield, Massachusetts, from Gormally Broadcasting, LLC. The deal will put WGGB under common ownership with Meredith's existing CBS affiliate in that market, low-powered WSHM-LD (FCC rules permit duopolies between full-power and low-power television stations regardless of the number of television stations in a given market), along with nearby Hartford, Connecticut, CBS affiliate WFSB (which simulcasts WSHM on one of their subchannels).
19	Netflix announces that it has signed Chelsea Handler to a deal that will allow the comedian to create specials and series with unfiltered content, including a relaunch of her talk show in 2016 (Her E! program Chelsea Lately ended on August 26).
22	The Ellen DeGeneres Show, The Steve Harvey Show, and The Young and the Restless are among notable winners at the 41st Daytime Emmy Awards. Kathy Griffin hosts the ceremony, which is an online-only broadcast after several years on broadcast or cable TV.
22	ESPN's longest running news program, SportsCenter, debuts their new "Studio X", which is contained in the new Digital Center 2 facility on the ESPN campus in Bristol, Connecticut. A matching redone studio at their presence at L.A. Live in Downtown Los Angeles debuts a day later. The new set also brings changes to the network's (as well as sister networks) BottomLine news ticker.
23	Sinclair Broadcast Group announces its intention to sell WHTM-TV, the ABC affiliate in Harrisburg, Pennsylvania, to Media General for $83.4 million. The company also announces the sale of the non-license assets of WTAT-TV, the Fox affiliate in Charleston, South Carolina, to that station's licensee Cunningham Broadcasting. The divestitures come as Sinclair continues to seek approval for its purchase of Allbritton Communications' television stations, which include WHTM.
24	Fox Television Stations announces it will acquire the San Francisco Bay Area duopoly of KTVU (Fox) and KICU-TV (Ind.) from Cox Media Group in a station swap. In return, Cox will receive Fox's O&O stations in Boston (WFXT) and Memphis (WHBQ-TV), which will remain Fox affiliates when the deal is complete.
25	In a 6–3 ruling favoring the American television networks, the U.S. Supreme Court rules that internet firm Aereo functions essentially like a cable system, and that its online streaming and storage of broadcasters' over-the-air signals without paying compulsory retransmission fees violates the public performance clause of the Copyright Act. The Justices indicate, however, that their ruling is not intended to discourage "the emergence or use of different kinds of technologies". The ruling leads to Aereo suspending its operations on June 28 and filing for Chapter 11 bankruptcy on November 21.
25	CBS's Big Brother becomes the last American prime-time network series to convert to a high-definition format, the result of a massive three-year technical upgrade of the show's fixed and robotic cameras and post-production facilities at CBS Studio Center in Studio City.
26	The 40th Saturn Awards ceremony, honoring the best in science fiction, fantasy and horror television in 2013, is held in Burbank, California. Series winners included Hannibal, Breaking Bad, and The Walking Dead.
27	The debut of Girl Meets World pulls in a record setting 5.2 million viewers overall, making the Boy Meets World-sequeled spin-off the most watched program in the 30-year history of the Disney Channel, the most-viewed series ever on the Watch Disney Channel authenticated app, and the most downloaded Disney Channel series preview on iTunes.
30	The U.S. Supreme Court declined on taking up a case in which Minority Television Project, the owners of San Francisco independent educational station KMTP, challenged its FCC fine that was imposed on them in 2002 for airing messages from commercial sponsors, which the FCC claimed were from for-profit advertisers. MTP had sought to overturn a lower court rulings that upheld a 1981 law that restricts public stations from airing ads for commercial products or political candidates and asked the court to reconsider a 1969 Supreme Court decision that allowed the government to place some restrictions on broadcast content, arguing that the media landscape had changed so much in the last 45 years, as well as their claim of first amendment rights. This comes after a 2013 en banc panel of the 9th Circuit ruling which agreed that the government was on solid legal ground and that it had a vested interest in ensuring that public TV retained its non-commercial nature, as stations licensed as non-commercial or public are prohibited from airing ads but can allow underwriting and spots for non-profits. The decision not to take up the case means the ban on commercials on Public television will remain in place.

=== July ===
Date	Event
1	Ownership of PBS NewsHour is transferred from MacNeil/Lehrer Productions (jointly owned by Liberty Media and former NewsHour anchors Robert MacNeil and Jim Lehrer) to WETA-TV/Washington, D.C., who have long housed production of the program at its Arlington, Virginia, studios. The transfer, approved by WETA's board of trustees on June 17, results in production of PBS NewsHour being taken over by NewsHour Productions, LLC, a wholly owned WETA subsidiary. The station acquires MacNeil/Lehrer Productions' archives, documentaries, and projects, though not the company's name. The program's weekend counterpart, PBS NewsHour Weekend, is not affected by the ownership transfer and continues to be produced in New York City by WNET.
2	News-Press & Gazette Company (owners of Yuma, Arizona Fox/ABC affiliate KECY-TV, and Telemundo low power station KESE-LP) have agreed to enter into a sharing agreement with Blackhawk Broadcasting, owners of NBC affiliate KYMA-DT, and CBS affiliate KSWT. The deal gives NPG operational control of all of the Big four television network affiliates in the Yuma market.
7	The A+E Networks-owned Biography Channel relaunches as the lifestyle-oriented FYI.
8	The Pentagon Channel rebrands as DoD News Channel.
11	NBC affiliate WTOV-TV in Steubenville, Ohio, announces that its DT2 subchannel would join Fox on September 1, replacing WTRF-DT2. Fox subsequently issues a statement citing WTOV-TV's stronger over-the-air signal as the reason they chose to switch stations. Upon the switch, WTOV-DT2's former affiliation with MeTV moves to a new third digital subchannel, while WTRF-DT2's secondary affiliation with MyNetworkTV becomes its primary affiliation.
13	Turner Sports broadcasts its final NASCAR race on TNT after 32 years, the Camping World RV Sales 301. Turner Sports had carried NASCAR races on TBS from 1983 until moving them to TNT in 2001.
19	A deputy judge on Britain's High Court of Justice rules that Fox Television Studios must find a new title for its US series Glee in the United Kingdom, ruling that Fox had infringed on the UK trademark for "Glee" held by Comic Enterprises, owners of The Glee Club chain of comedy clubs. Fox, claiming that a change in the show's name "would adversely affect fans’ enjoyment of Glee in the UK," has filed an appeal of the ruling.
24	Gray Television announces it will acquire SJL Broadcasting's ABC affiliates in the Flint/Tri-Cities (WJRT-TV) and Toledo (WTVG) markets in a $128 million deal. SJL had owned the stations since 2010, when they reacquired them from ABC in a $30 million deal (ABC bought them from SJL for $120 million in 1995 as a backstop to ward off a possible CBS affiliation on WXYZ-TV/Detroit before a long-term affiliation deal with E. W. Scripps Company was made during the 1994 affiliation shifts).
24	The Federal Communications Commission approves the sale of Allbritton Communications to Sinclair Broadcast Group after nearly a year of consideration, which includes the license turnovers in Birmingham and Charleston, South Carolina proposed on May 29 and the sale of ABC affiliate WHTM-TV/Harrisburg, Pennsylvania, but the Commission warns extra scrutiny would come involving Sinclair and their ties to Cunningham Broadcasting in the Charleston area.
24	Lifetime announces that it has canceled plans to air the reality television series Good Grief, which would have followed the owners of the Johnson Family Mortuary in Fort Worth, Texas. The program's scrapping came in the wake of the July 15 discovery of eight unattended or decomposing bodies at the funeral home, which led to the arrests of owner Dondre Johnson and his wife Rachel Hardy-Johnson. (The funeral home's landlord, who was executing an eviction process, discovered the bodies and alerted authorities.) The funeral home itself has been the subject of an investigation by The Texas Funeral Services Commission and has been scrutinized by critics and the local media about their practices and boastful promoting of the series prior to their arrest.
24	After three episodes leaked online in June via the website of their Mexican sister network and it was rushed to premiere unexpectedly to lower ratings than expected because of lack of promotion, Nickelodeon announces the remaining five episodes of the third season of The Legend of Korra will air only online through various video providers.
25	News Corporation informs radio broadcasting company Entercom that it is pulling all of its advertising and promotional tie-ins involving its broadcast/cable outlets and 20th Century Fox film/TV studios from all Entercom stations nationwide. The move came in the wake of sexist comments and a similarly toned apology by Kirk Minihane, a co-host of the Dennis and Callahan show on Entercom-owned Boston sports station WEEI-FM. Minihane's comments regarded Fox Sports reporter Erin Andrews' interview with St. Louis Cardinals pitcher Adam Wainwright during Fox's broadcast of the 2014 MLB All-Star Game on July 15. Minihane's comments lead to his one-week suspension by WEEI, a move that appeases Fox enough to restore its ad buys with Entercom on July 30. (Dennis and Callahan is also partially simulcast on television by NESN, who in an unrelated move announced on July 24 it would discontinue it in September.)
28	Post-Newsweek Stations, which owns or operates TV stations in six markets (among them WDIV/Detroit and KPRC-TV/Houston), is rechristened Graham Media Group. Graham Media is the TV division of Graham Holdings Company, which had changed its own name from The Washington Post Company after its sale of Newsweek and The Washington Post.
28	Just eight days after he was profiled on CNN's The Hunt With John Walsh, Charles Modzir, a child molester and pornographer who had been on the run since June 25, 2012, when he failed to show up at the San Diego County Courthouse in California for his sentencing in which he was convicted of molesting the son of a family friend while he was baby sitting, is shot and killed in a shoot out with police and U.S. Marshals in New York City's Greenwich Village.
29	Another set of controversial comments involving sports and the media's handling of the story takes center stage, as ESPN suspends Stephen A. Smith, the host of ESPN2's First Take, for one week after he made remarks on July 25 about domestic violence pertaining to the NFL's questionable action regarding Baltimore Ravens running back Ray Rice, who received a two-game suspension after he was arrested on charges of domestic and physical abuse, in which Smith suggested that Rice's fiancé might also be responsible for provoking the action that lead to the incident.
30	Comcast shuts down Fearnet and moves its programming to Chiller and Syfy.
30	The E. W. Scripps Company and Journal Communications announce that the two companies will merge to form a broadcast group under the E. W. Scripps Company name, which will be based in Scripps' headquarters city of Cincinnati and own 34 television stations in 24 markets and 35 radio stations in eight markets (putting the company in 27 markets overall), along with retaining the Scripps National Spelling Bee. The two companies' newspaper assets will then be spun-off as a separate company based in Journal's Milwaukee facilities under the Journal Media Group name. The transaction is slated to be completed in 2015, pending shareholder and regulatory approvals. On August 20, Scripps announced that it will spin off one of the Boise properties (either ABC affiliate KIVI or FOX affiliate KNIN) as part of a divestiure plan.

=== August ===
Date	Event
3	Just 22 days after he was profiled on CNN's The Hunt With John Walsh, a hiker discovered the remains of Shane Miller, a convicted felon who was the subject of a manhunt after he murdered his wife and two daughters on May 7, 2013. Miller's body was found outside a creek near Petrolia, California, where he last seen after evading authorities. Miller was the first person to be profiled on The Hunt and its second to have met with a deadly conclusion following Charles Modzir's death in a shoot out with law enforcement on July 28.
4	Nexstar Broadcasting Group announces that it would sell CBS affiliate WEVV-TV/Evansville, Indiana, to Bayou City Broadcasting for $18.6 million. The deal brings Nexstar's planned acquisition of WEVV's current owners, Communications Corporation of America, whose sale has been held up for more than a year due to ownership conflicts with Nexstar-owned/managed stations in certain markets where ComCorp also owned or operated stations, in compliance with Department of Justice requirements for approval of the deal. The deal marks a return to station ownership for the minority-owned Bayou City, which had sold its seven television stations to the London Broadcasting Company (most of which have since been sold to the Gannett Company) in September 2012.
5	Gannett Company announces plans to split its newspaper/publishing and broadcast/digital operations into two separate companies.
11	As part of renewal deals for its four existing CBS affiliates, Tribune Broadcasting signs a deal with CBS to have WTTV become the network's Indianapolis affiliate. The move to WTTV, effective New Year's Day 2015, will end CBS' 58-year relationship with WISH-TV, and is reportedly the result of disagreements between CBS and the LIN Media-owned WISH over the network's demands for reverse compensation of retransmission consent from its affiliates. Though WISH initially intended to become an independent station, it would announce on December 22 that it would take over WTTV's CW affiliation (The CW initially would have moved to WTTV's secondary subchannel).
11	Sherri Shepherd and Jenny McCarthy make their final appearances as co-hosts of The View. Both women had announced in June their intentions to leave the ABC daytime talk show (Shepherd after seven seasons, McCarthy after one).
14	SEC Network makes its debut. The ESPN-owned cable/satellite network features live game broadcasts and related coverage of the Southeastern Conference and its member schools.
14	The RTDNA, an organization that represents news journalists and reporters, sends a letter to the Chief of Police in Ferguson, Missouri, condemning its treatment of reporters in its handling of gathering coverage related to the Shooting of Michael Brown, an unarmed teenager suspected of robbing a convenience store, by Darren Wilson, a Ferguson police officer, on August 9, leading to riots which have seen police officers harassing, abusing, and arresting reporters and cameramen while they were covering the riots and protests that accelerated since the shooting. Five days later on August 19, SAG-AFTRA (whose members also include media journalists), along with President Obama, joins the RTDNA in condemning the actions of the local law enforcement agencies as more members of the press are detained or arrested. Three days later on August 22, Dan Page, a St. Louis County Police officer, was suspended by the department after pushing CNN reporter Don Lemon while Lemon was reporting live in front of a protest on August 18. Lemon later found a video about Page that was posted in April on YouTube featuring him expressing his anti-Semitic and anti-government views, which were added to the list of suspensions by the department. Page would resign from his job August 29.
15	Former U.S. Vice President Al Gore files a lawsuit against Al Jazeera Media Network, accusing the Middle Eastern broadcaster of fraud and citing the refusal to turn over "tens of millions of dollars" remaining in an escrow account and still owed to the selling shareholders of Current TV. The network was acquired by Al Jazeera (from an ownership group headed by Gore) in January 2013 and relaunched as Al Jazeera America that summer.
18	Digital multicast networks Escape and Grit simultaneously debut. The networks, owned by Katz Broadcasting (whose owner, Jonathan Katz, is co-founder and COO of Bounce TV), feature programming targeted towards different demographic audiences (Escape towards women, Grit towards men).
20	As part of their merger, Media General and LIN Media announce a series of deals necessary to resolve ownership conflicts in the five markets in which both companies own stations. WJAR (NBC) in Providence, Rhode Island, WLUK-TV (Fox) and WCWF (CW) in Green Bay, and WTGS (Fox) in Savannah, Georgia, will be swapped to Sinclair Broadcast Group for KXRM-TV (Fox) and KXTU-LD (CW) in Colorado Springs and WTTA (MyNetworkTV) in Tampa. Hearst Television will acquire WVTM-TV (NBC) in Birmingham, Alabama, and WJCL (ABC) in Savannah, while Meredith Corporation will purchase WALA-TV (Fox) in Mobile, Alabama.
21	Starting at 10 am (ET) with the inaugural episode, FXX begins airing in chronological order every episode of The Simpsons from its first 25 seasons (552 in all) plus the 2007 motion picture The Simpsons Movie in what is a record-breaking marathon, running through 11:59 pm ET on September 1. The marathon marks FX Networks' November 2013 acquisition of cable syndication and on-demand rights to all Simpsons episodes (an estimated $750 million deal). The show became a regular part of FXX's lineup after the marathon concluded.
25	Modern Family and Breaking Bad are among the top winners at the 66th Primetime Emmy Awards. Seth Meyers emcees the event (airing on NBC), which takes place on a Monday for the first time since 1976 (to avoid conflicts with NBC's Sunday Night Football and MTV's Video Music Awards on the 24th).
26	While taping a segment, Bryce Dion, a sound technician for Cops is accidentally killed by a police officer during a shootout at a Wendy's restaurant in Omaha, Nebraska, involving a robbery suspect (who was also killed). In his honor, the show aired an hour-long "best of" episode featuring Dion's work on its September 20 episode.
27	Diane Sawyer anchors her last edition of ABC World News, moving to reporting projects for the network. As of September 1, her duties are split between 20/20 co-anchor and World News weekend anchor David Muir, who succeeds Sawyer as weeknight anchor and managing editor, and Good Morning America and This Week host George Stephanopoulos, who assumes the lead anchor role on all special reports and breaking news coverage.
30	The American Sports Network commences programming. The Sinclair Broadcast Group-owned syndicator features telecasts of the Big South Conference, Colonial Athletic Association, Conference USA, Patriot League and Southern Conference

=== September ===
Date	Event
1	PBS' Sesame Street launches a 30-minute afternoon version of the show, designed to accommodate online and mobile viewing. The condensed version eschews long-form segments of Sesame Street's hour-long morning episodes, which remain on the air.
2	James Holzhauer, best known for his Jeopardy! appearance in 2019, made his game show debut in the game show The Chase and won $58,333.33 (an equal share of $175,000 split into two other contestants); during the episode's broadcast, the episode set a record of its largest Cash Builder ($60,000) and Final Chase (19 questions) for the American version of The Chase.
3	Sinclair Broadcast Group announces the $120 million purchase of Las Vegas television station, KSNV-DT (NBC), from Intermountain West Communications Company. Since Sinclair already owns two stations in Las Vegas, KVMY (MyNetworkTV) and KVCW (The CW), it will sell the license of one of the stations and move that station's programming to the remaining two stations. A caveat of KSNV's deal is the setting aside of 80–85% of sale proceeds towards the formation of a foundation to support students and educators in southern Nevada, as dictated by the trust of IWCC's longtime owner, the late Jim Rogers.
7	Two Cox Media Group stations in Jacksonville, Florida, undergo call sign changes: Fox affiliate WAWS becomes WFOX-TV, while CBS station WTEV-TV becomes WJAX-TV.
7	NBC News political director Chuck Todd takes over as new host of Meet the Press, succeeding David Gregory.
7	CBS' The NFL Today unveils a revamped analyst panel, featuring new additions Tony Gonzalez and Bart Scott. They succeed Dan Marino and Shannon Sharpe, who were dropped from the show in February.
11	The first Thursday Night Football game produced by CBS Sports in partnership with the NFL Network airs, with the Pittsburgh Steelers taking on the Baltimore Ravens. Changes to game coverage are made in the wake of a domestic violence controversy involving Ravens player Ray Rice, including the removal of Rihanna's "Run This Town" from the opening segment. The song is later pulled from future broadcasts after the singer complains via Twitter that almost resulted in CBS deciding to edit out her vocals from the song because of her tweets just moments before dropping the song altogether. Rihanna's record label Roc Nation later stated it was their decision to pull the song, claiming CBS used it without permission.
13	The Xploration Station block, which features programs exploring the STEM fields of science and technology, launches on Fox. The block, which is produced by Steve Rotfeld Productions, broadcasts in the same Saturday morning time slot that is held by the Weekend Marketplace infomercial block (though some Fox affiliates have chosen to continue running Marketplace instead of Xploration).
15	ABC's The View starts its 18th season by unveiling a new host panel, with incumbent Whoopi Goldberg being joined by returnee Rosie O'Donnell and new hosts Rosie Perez and Nicolle Wallace.
15	WBIN-TV/Derry, New Hampshire, debuts a weeknight 90-minute early evening news block at 5 pm and a nightly 10 pm newscast under the NH1 News branding, based out of a newsroom in Concord and news bureaus in Nashua, Derry, Portsmouth, Laconia, and Lebanon (the station's non-news operations remain at the Derry facility). The new news operation competes against the longer-established WMUR-TV.
15	Fifty-one years after her last late-night talk show appearance on The Tonight Show, Barbra Streisand returns to NBC Studio 6B and Tonight to promote her new album Partners.
16	Heartland Media announces its planned purchase of WTVA, the NBC (and, through a subchannel, ABC) affiliate in Tupelo, Mississippi, from the Spain family-controlled WTVA, Inc. The family has owned the station for 57 years. Heartland will also inherit the agreements through which WTVA operates separately owned Fox affiliate WLOV-TV; separately, on October 7, Coastal Television Broadcasting Company announces that it will buy WLOV from Tupelo Broadcasting, Inc.
17	In NBC, magician Mat Franco was announced the winner of the ninth instalment of America's Got Talent, making him the first magician act to win.
17	Takoma Park Middle School teacher Sarah Manchester become the third $1,000,000 winner in the third episode of the 32nd season of the long-running game show Wheel of Fortune. Her winnings of $1,017,490 made her the third largest single-day winner in the show history. The episode total of $1,042,590 also surpasses the former all-time one-day total ($1,034,930) which previously held on the October 14, 2008's episode. She would be the last million dollar winner until 2025.
21	While presenting a report on a ballot measure campaign to legalize the recreational use of cannabis in Alaska, KTVA/Anchorage reporter Charlo Green reveals that she is owner of a medicinal cannabis club promoting the issue, and announces on-air that she is quitting her job at KTVA to devote her energies to the campaign (using an F-bomb in the process).
22	Let's Make a Deal begins the sixth season of its current incarnation in a high-definition format, making the CBS game show the last regularly scheduled broadcast network program to complete the transition from standard definition to HD.
23	Tribune Media confirms it received notice from Fox that the network would terminate its affiliation agreement with Tribune's KCPQ/Seattle. Fox has been actively pursuing station acquisitions in markets with teams in the NFL's National Conference, for which Fox has broadcast rights (Seattle, home to the Seahawks, is such a market), and on October 3 files documents to purchase ShopHQ station KBCB, which serves Seattle but is licensed to Bellingham and is closer to the Canadian cities of Vancouver and Victoria. Fox and Tribune make peace by October 17, when the two announce a new affiliation deal for KCPQ that runs through July 2018 and increases reverse compensation payments to Fox.
24	With the season 16 premiere of Law & Order: Special Victims Unit, NBC's Law & Order franchise marks its 25th anniversary. (SVU is a spinoff of the original Law & Order series.)
27	Chris Pratt and Ariana Grande are host and musical guest as Saturday Night Live begins its 40th season. The episode marks two significant changes at SNL: former castmember Darrell Hammond succeeds the late Don Pardo (the show's announcer since its premiere in 1975), and Michael Che succeeds Cecily Strong as Weekend Update co-anchor alongside Colin Jost.
28	The Griffin family travels to Springfield and meets the titular family of The Simpsons on Family Guy's 13th-season premiere.
28	Following American Dad!'s move to TBS, Fox replaces the Sunday Animation Domination block with the Sunday Block with Brooklyn Nine-Nine and Mulaney joining The Simpsons, Bob's Burgers and Family Guy, marking the first time live-action comedies would air on Fox's Sunday schedule since 2005.
29	Hallmark Movie Channel rebrands as Hallmark Movies & Mysteries with the addition of original movies of the mystery genre.
29	Heroes & Icons makes its debut. The Weigel Broadcasting-owned digital network primarily features reruns of classic police, action, and adventure series.
30	One week after ending production on two of its local shows and reportedly laying off most of its staff, Family Broadcasting Group announces it will sell KSBI/Oklahoma City to Griffin Communications. The sale, which is completed by December, creates a duopoly between the MyNetworkTV-affiliated KSBI and Griffin's CBS affiliate KWTV-DT.
30	The FCC unanimously votes to end federal enforcement of the policy that has allowed the National Football League to blackout local telecasts of any game should it fail to sell out within 72 hours of kickoff.

=== October ===
Date	Event
1	DirecTV extends its exclusive contract with the NFL for out of market sports package NFL Sunday Ticket for eight more seasons, a deal worth $1.5 billion per year.
1	ESPN Classic begins a phaseout of its linear channel as it transitions to a video-on-demand service. Dish Network is the first provider to drop the linear ESPN Classic as part of the transition.
4	Litton Entertainment's One Magnificent Morning E/I block commences on The CW, giving Litton control of three of the five major Saturday morning children's lineups (Litton also manages ABC's Weekend Adventure and CBS' Dream Team). The change occurs one week after the end of the Vortexx block of animated shows on The CW (which was managed by Saban Brands under a time lease). It also means that all five major broadcast networks feature Saturday morning children's blocks that are exclusively E/I.
6	The National Basketball Association announces a new broadcast deal, reportedly worth over $2.5 billion per year, that allows games to remain on ESPN/ABC and TNT through the 2024–25 season.
6	WNBJ-LD in Jackson, Tennessee, begins airing on Dish Network as an NBC affiliate, giving the Jackson market its first NBC affiliate. An earlier plan to bring an NBC affiliate to the area by New Moon Communications had fallen through when the license for WZMC-LP was cancelled in July 2013. WNBJ-LD's channel 39 transmitter signed-on in November (with cable carriage following soon after), and DirecTV added WNBJ-LD to its local packages shortly after the new year. The sign-on gives the Jackson area in-market affiliates of all four major commercial broadcast networks for the first time.
7–8	In light of child molestation allegations against Stephen Collins, who played Rev. Eric Camden in the long-running WB/CW series 7th Heaven, the family-friendly cable network Up pulls repeats of the Paramount Television series from their schedule, with a return depending on viewer feedback and further events. In turn, TVGN, which shares the rights with Up (and is partially owned by CBS Corporation) also pulls their repeats. Collins also saw his recurring role as news anchor Reed Wallace cut from already-filmed future episodes of Scandal the next day.
8	Fox Television Stations completes its acquisition of the San Francisco Bay Area duopoly of KTVU and KICU-TV from Cox Media Group, in exchange for WFXT in Boston and WHBQ-TV in Memphis as part of a station tradeoff.
13	Hub Network rebrands as Discovery Family, the result of Discovery Communications gaining a 60% ownership in the network after equally owning the network with Hasbro, who retains the remaining 40%. The change also sees Discovery program the network's primetime schedule, with Hasbro programming children's content in the daytime.
13	The Federal Communications Commission delays a planned digital transition for low-power television stations still operating in analog originally scheduled to occur on September 1, 2015. The delay of the transition – which will require analog LPTV stations to flash-cut to digital or cease operations – was decided upon to address issues surrounding the incentive spectrum auction planned for 2016 including how to protect new and existing low-power and translator stations that would be displaced by the auction and concurrent channel repacking (with these stations being allowed to share a common RF channel), and whether to allow digital LPTV stations to operate "Franken-FMs" (broadcast stations operating on analog VHF channel 6 for the purpose of transmitting audio programming receivable on FM radios on the 87.7 frequency).
15	Citadel Communications combines its two TV properties in Sarasota, Florida, over-the-air station WLWN-LD and cable news channel Suncoast News Network, into a single station under the WSNN-LD call sign. The combined station features SNN-produced content and inherits WLWN's over-the-air channel (39) and SNN's cable carriage.
16	CBS launches a new pay on-demand service called CBS All Access, which allows streaming of live CBS programming content (except for NFL Football telecasts), current shows, its library of classic series, and local streaming of its owned & operated stations and affiliates.
21	CNN, HLN, Cartoon Network, and Boomerang are among several Turner Broadcasting networks pulled from Dish Network at 2 am (EDT), the result of an unresolved carriage dispute. (Turner flagships TBS and TNT are not part of the disagreement and remain on Dish.) Both sides announce a mutual agreement to restore the channels on November 21.
23	Nexstar Broadcasting Group announces it will buy KASW/Phoenix from SagamoreHill Broadcasting in a $68 million deal. The sale of the CW-affiliated KASW fulfills a divestiture promise made by Meredith Corporation, which has operated KASW for SagamoreHill since acquiring the station and KTVK in its 2013 purchase of divestitures made by Sander Media on behalf of Gannett, after the latter's buyout of Belo. Meredith also owns KPHO in the market.
23	AMC Networks announces it has acquired a 49.9% stake of and operational control in BBC America, with the international arm of the channel's namesake retaining the remaining 50.1%.
24	Despite a new season already filmed and ready to air, TLC announces it has canceled reality series Here Comes Honey Boo Boo. The cancellation comes one day after TMZ reports that "Mama June" Shannon, mother of title character and former child beauty pageant participant Alana "Honey Boo Boo" Thompson, was dating a registered sex offender who had served a prison sentence in Georgia for child molestation (a relationship Shannon denies), and that a victim of the offender, who was 8 years old at the time of the incident, is a relative of Shannon's.
26	For the first time in its history, the National Football League airs games in four scheduled-in-advance Sunday television windows, by virtue of Fox's airing of the Atlanta Falcons-Detroit Lions game played in London, England (the game starts at 9:30 am EDT, or 1:30 pm in London).
27	TruTV unveils a new program revamp, turning its emphasis from reality and true crime programming towards unscripted comedic programming (complete with a new slogan, "Way more fun").

=== November ===
Date	Event
4	Nexstar Broadcasting Group acquires CW affiliate KCWI/Des Moines from Pappas Telecasting Companies. The purchase, pending FCC approval, will create a duopoly with ABC affiliate WOI-TV (which Nexstar had purchased from Citadel Communications in 2013). KCWI's current sister station, This TV/MyNetworkTV affiliate KDMI, will remain under Pappas ownership.
5	Late-night host Jimmy Kimmel, while entertaining his in-studio audience, beams himself to the Country Music Association Awards in Nashville as a hologram, where he interviews award winner Kacey Musgraves. Later, the country music act Florida Georgia Line performs on stage in Nashville, while simultaneously being shown as holograms in Hollywood.
12–14	NBC personality Al Roker sets a Guinness-verified world record for the longest continuous live weather broadcast. His 34-hour marathon, which aired mainly online and concluded on Today on the 14th, surpasses by one hour the mark Norwegian weathercaster Eli Kari Gjengedal set in September.
17	After its purchase from chapter 11 bankruptcy by DirecTV Sports Networks and AT&T, Comcast SportsNet Houston relaunches as Root Sports Southwest and is added to DirecTV and AT&T U-verse for the first time.
17–21	The Late Late Show with Craig Ferguson, which rarely has live music, features a full week of Metallica performances. In the same week, U2 had to cancel a five-day stint of guest spots on The Tonight Show with Jimmy Fallon after front man Bono broke his arm in a bicycling accident in Central Park on the 16th which required surgery.
19	NBC drops its plans for a new sitcom starring Bill Cosby. The move is part of the fallout from claims of rape and sexual abuse against Cosby, first highlighted in an October 17 performance by comedian Hannibal Buress and revealed by several women since, including Janice Dickinson in a November 18 interview with Entertainment Tonight. (Cosby's representatives have denied the allegations, while Cosby himself, who has not been officially charged with any crime, has been non-committal.) NBC is only one of several outlets to distance itself from Cosby in wake of the allegations: Netflix would pull a special honoring Cosby's 77th birthday scheduled for the week of Thanksgiving, the same week TV Land was to have aired a marathon of The Cosby Show (which the network dropped completely from its schedule); a guest spot by Cosby on Late Show with David Letterman for this date was previously cancelled.
20	President Barack Obama delivers an early prime time (8 pm ET) address on immigration reform. Though it concerns a controversial topic, the four major broadcast networks (ABC, CBS, Fox, and NBC) decline to air the speech, although several East Coast affiliates (notably NBC's O&O flagship in New York) bypass their networks' decision and present it to their viewers. (In contrast, most major Spanish language networks including Univision, MundoFox and Telemundo give full carriage to the speech, as does PBS and the major networks' West Coast affiliates as part of their evening newscasts.)
21	Nexstar Broadcasting Group announces its intention to purchase CBS affiliate KLAS-TV/Las Vegas from Landmark Media Enterprises for $145 million; it is the last remaining television station in Landmark's portfolio.
24	Radio broadcaster Cumulus Media extends its Nash FM country music brand and platform to cable through a partnership with Music Choice, featuring video-on-demand and original TV content in addition to radio simulcasts.
25	Alfonso Ribeiro is crowned the winner in the 19th season of Dancing With The Stars.

=== December ===
Date	Event
5	CBS Corporation pulls 29 television stations it owns in 18 markets and its cable networks nationally from Dish Network in a retransmission dispute. The channels return to Dish the next morning after the two sides reach a new carriage deal, which also covers streaming rights and disabling of Dish's ad-skipping Hopper system for seven days after a program's original broadcast.
7	Discovery Channel airs the two-hour special Eaten Alive, in which wildlife expert Paul Rosalie voluntarily dons a special suit in order to be swallowed whole by an anaconda. Despite the title, Rosalie is not eaten alive, as he asks his team to abort the stunt after the snake begins to crush Rosalie's arm and its mouth only reaches his head.
9	The 2014 Victoria's Secret Fashion Show is broadcast on CBS. 9.29 million people tune in.
17	KCEN/Waco morning meteorologist Patrick Crawford is shot and seriously wounded by an unknown man in an incident in the NBC affiliate's parking lot. Crawford recovers and returns to the air on January 19, 2015.
17	Former The Amazing Race contestant Natalie Anderson won the 29th season of Survivor (a twist similar to Survivor: Blood vs. Water in which nine pairs of two which has a pre-existing relationship were split into two different tribes), making her the first alumni who previously participated in a CBS reality television to win a season in another CBS reality program. Earlier in the premiere episode, her teammate and twin sister Nadiya was the first contestant eliminated in the game.
18	The final episode of The Colbert Report airs on Comedy Central, after nine years. Stephen Colbert would succeed David Letterman as Late Show host in 2015.
19	After 14 years, BET's 106 & Park airs its final daily broadcast on the network. The show will move full-time to BET's website in 2015, though occasional event specials will continue to air on TV.
19	Jay Leno is the guest as Craig Ferguson ends his 10-year run as host of The Late Late Show. The episode's centerpieces include a star-studded performance of Scottish band Dead Man Fall's song "Bang Your Drum", an end-of-show revelation that the show's pantomime horse Secretariat was played by Bob Newhart, and a Newhart-style "dream sequence" suggesting that the whole series was a nightmare had by Ferguson's former Drew Carey Show character Nigel Wick, with an overweight Carey in bed next to him. James Corden will take over as Late Late Show host in March 2015, with guest hosts filling the interim.
21	21st Century Fox pulls Fox News Channel and Fox Business Network from Dish Network's channel lineup in a carriage dispute. Dish claims excessive rate increases, including those for unrelated programming contracts with other Fox networks, for the removal of the channels. Fox would counter with an ad campaign claiming censorship of news on Dish's part. Both channels return to Dish on January 15, 2015, after a new agreement is reached that increases Fox News' per-subscriber fee and moves Fox Business to the same programming tier as its sister network.
21	Candy Crowley hosts CNN's State of the Union for the final time, ending her four-year run as the show's host and her 27-year tenure as a reporter and political correspondent for the network.
23	DirecTV and The Walt Disney Company sign a new carriage agreement that will allow the satcaster to provide the TV Everywhere feeds of members of the Disney Channel, ESPN and ABC families, sports packages ESPN3, ESPN Buzzer Beater and ESPN Goal Line, and the cable channels Fusion and Longhorn Network. The deal also includes ABC's owned and operated stations in eight markets.
26	Wheel of Fortune contestant Matt DeSanto sets a one-day main game record of $91,892 cash and prizes, surpassing previous record set by Leanne McLaughlin who won $69,300 on December 21, 2012's episode.
31	After nearly 13 years on the air, the NBCUniversal cable channel G4 finally discontinues operations, departing from the few remaining television providers still carrying it at the time, most notably AT&T U-verse. The network ends with a sign-off featuring a continually shrinking game of Pong fading to black with an analog television turn-off effect.

== Programs ==
=== Debuts ===
These shows premiered during 2014.

Date	Show	Channel	Source
January 1	Every Witch Way	Nickelodeon	
January 1	Kim of Queens	Lifetime	
January 1	Vacation House for Free	HGTV	
January 2	Toned Up	Bravo	
January 2	Cold River Cash	Animal Planet	
January 2	Do or Die	National Geographic Channel	
January 4	Rev Run's Renovation	DIY Network	
January 5	Blood, Sweat & Heels	Bravo	
January 6	Wolf Watch	MTV	
January 7	100 Days of Summer	Bravo	
January 7	Intelligence	CBS	
January 7	Killer Women	ABC	
January 7	Escaping the Prophet	TLC	
January 7	Beat the House	HGTV	
January 8	Chicago P.D.	NBC	
January 8	Mind of a Man	Game Show Network	
January 10	Helix	Syfy	
January 10	Enlisted	Fox	
January 11	When Calls the Heart	Hallmark Channel	
January 12	True Detective	HBO	
January 12	90 Day Fiance	TLC	
January 13	Bitten	Syfy	
January 13	Chozen	FX	
January 13	Don't Trust Andrew Mayne	A&E	
January 15	Crazy Hearts: Nashville	A&E	
January 16	Jerks with Camera	MTV	
January 16	The Brian Boitano Project	HGTV	
January 16	Under the Gunn	Lifetime	
January 17	I Didn't Do It	Disney Channel	
January 18	Thrift Hunters	Spike	
January 18	My Big Redneck Family	CMT	
January 19	Looking	HBO	
January 19	Rich Kids of Beverly Hills	E!	
January 20	Sheriff Callie's Wild West	Disney Jr.	
January 21	Opposite Worlds	Syfy	
January 21	Are You the One?	MTV	
January 22	Broad City	Comedy Central	
January 22	Wahlburgers	A&E	
January 22	Dark Rye	Pivot	
January 23	Rake	Fox	
January 25	Black Sails	Starz	
January 27	Rods N' Wheels	Discovery Channel	
February 3	Wallykazam!	Nickelodeon	
February 5	Buy This Restaurant	Food Network	
February 12	Mixels	Cartoon Network	
February 13	Tattoos Titans	CMT	
February 16	Top Chef: Stars	NBC	
February 17	Breadwinners	Nickelodeon	
February 17	Star-Crossed	The CW	
February 17	The Tonight Show Starring Jimmy Fallon	NBC	
February 22	About a Boy	NBC	
February 23	Growing Up Fisher	NBC	
February 24	Late Night with Seth Meyers	NBC	
February 24	Opening Bell with Maria Bartiromo	Fox Business Network	
February 24	Private Lives of Nashville Wives	TNT	
February 24	Ronan Farrow Daily	MSNBC	
February 24	The Reid Report	MSNBC	
February 25	Game of Arms	AMC	
February 25	Chrome Underground	Discovery Channel	
February 25	Mind Games	ABC	
February 26	Mixology	ABC	
February 27	The Red Road	Sundance TV	
February 28	Inside Job	TNT	
February 28	Save Our Business	TNT	
March 1	Deion's Family Playbook	Oprah Winfrey Network	
March 1	From Dusk till Dawn: The Series	El Rey Network	
March 3	Southern Charm	Bravo	
March 3	Those Who Kill	A&E	
March 3	Disney's Win, Lose or Draw	Disney Channel	
March 5	Bring It!	Lifetime	
March 6	Celebrity Home Raiders	Lifetime	
March 6	Chicagoland	CNN	
March 6	Review	Comedy Central	
March 6	Saint George	FX	
March 6	Sirens	USA Network	
March 9	Resurrection	ABC	
March 9	Cosmos: A Spacetime Odyssey	Fox and Nat Geo	
March 9	Lindsay	Oprah Winfrey Network	
March 9	Online Dating Rituals of the American Male	Bravo	
March 9	Catch a Contractor	Spike	
March 10	Believe	NBC	
March 10	Heirs to the Dare	Discovery Channel	
March 11	Chrisley Knows Best	USA Network	
March 11	From Dusk till Dawn: The Series	El Rey Network	
March 16	Crisis	NBC	
March 16	Naked After Dark	Discovery Channel	
March 17	Lords of the Car Hoards	Discovery Channel	
March 17	The Fabulist	E!	
March 18	Chasing Maria Menounos	Oxygen	
March 18	Barry'd Treasure	A&E	
March 19	The 100	The CW	
March 19	Money Talks	CNBC	
March 23	American Dream Builders	NBC	
March 25	Jim Henson's Creature Shop Challenge	Syfy	
March 27	Surviving Jack	Fox	
March 31	Friends with Better Lives	CBS	
March 31	House of Food	MTV	
March 31	This Is Hot 97	VH1	
April 1	Off the Bat from the MLB Fan Cave	MTV2	
April 2	TripTank	Comedy Central	
April 6	Silicon Valley	HBO	
April 6	Turn: Washington's Spies	AMC	
April 6	Unusually Thicke	TVGN	
April 7	Kitchen Casino	Food Network	
April 9	The Tom and Jerry Show	Cartoon Network	
April 10	FNA USA	CMT	
April 12	Comedy Underground with Dave Attell	Comedy Central	
April 12	Love in the City	Oprah Winfrey Network	
April 14	Clarence	Cartoon Network	
April 14	Métal Hurlant Chronicles	Syfy	
April 14	CNN Tonight	CNN	
April 14	Bam's Bad Ass Game Show	TBS	
April 15	Fargo	FX	
April 16	Jobs That Don't Suck	MTV2	
April 19	Tobacco Wars	CMT	
April 20	Salem	WGN America	
April 20	Signed, Sealed, Delivered	Hallmark Channel	
April 21	Rewrapped	Food Network	
April 21	The Ex and The Why	MTV	
April 21	Time's Up	MTV	
April 22	Faking It	MTV	
April 24	Bad Teacher	CBS	
April 24	Black Box	ABC	
April 27	Last Week Tonight with John Oliver	HBO	
April 28	Outnumbered	Fox News	
April 29	Playing House	USA Network	
May 2	Space Racers	PBS Kids	
May 6	Alaskan Bush People	Discovery Channel	
May 11	Penny Dreadful	Showtime	
May 11	Hungry Investors	Spike	
May 13	Inside: US Soccer's March to Brazil	ESPN	
May 13	Riot	Fox	
May 20	I Wanna Marry "Harry"	Fox	
May 22	Gang Related	Fox	
May 27	The Wil Wheaton Project	Syfy	
May 27	Little Women: LA	Lifetime	
May 27	The Night Shift	NBC	
May 29	Undateable	NBC	
May 30	Crossbones	NBC	
May 30	No Limits	Animal Planet	
May 30	Topless Prophet	Cinemax	
May 31	Sing Your Face Off	ABC	
June 1	Halt and Catch Fire	AMC	
June 1	Last Seen Alive	Investigation Discovery	
June 2	Webheads	Nickelodeon	
June 2	Ladies of London	Bravo	
June 3	Famous in 12	The CW	
June 4	Jennifer Falls	TV Land	
June 7	Power	Starz	
June 8	Escape Club	E!	
June 8	Frankenfood	Spike	
June 8	The Hunt	History	
June 9	Murder in the First	TNT	
June 10	Chasing Life	ABC Family	
June 11	Big Smo	A&E	
June 15	King Star King	Adult Swim	
June 19	Dominion	Syfy	
June 20	Funniest Wins	TBS	
June 22	Rising Star	ABC	
June 22	The Last Ship	TNT	
June 23	CeeLo Green's The Good Life	TBS	
June 24	Tyrant	FX	
June 24	Botched	E!	
June 24	Motor City Masters	truTV	
June 25	Mystery Girls	ABC Family	
June 25	Young & Hungry	ABC Family	
June 25	Taxi Brooklyn	NBC	
June 27	Girl Meets World	Disney Channel	
June 28	Buying Naked	TLC	
June 29	The Leftovers	HBO	
June 29	Reckless	CBS	
July 7	The 7D	Disney XD	
July 8	Finding Carter	MTV	
July 8	Married at First Sight	Fyi	
July 8	Restaurant Startup	CNBC	
July 9	Extant	CBS	
July 10	Welcome to Sweden	NBC	
July 10	Working the Engels	NBC	
July 10	Leah Remini: It's All Relative	TLC	
July 13	The Strain	FX	
July 13	The Hunt with John Walsh	CNN	
July 14	Backpackers	The CW	
July 14	Jose Diaz-Balart	MSNBC	
July 15	Matador	El Rey Network	
July 16	The Divide	WE tv	
July 16	Virgin Territory	MTV	
July 17	Rush	USA Network	
July 17	Satisfaction	USA Network	
July 17	Married	FX	
July 17	You're the Worst	FX	
July 17	Candidly Nicole	VH1	
July 17	Dating Naked	VH1	
July 20	The Lottery	Lifetime	
July 21	Food Fest Nation	Food Network	
July 22	Food Fighters	NBC	
July 23	BAPs	Lifetime	
July 26	Henry Danger	Nickelodeon	
July 27	Escaping Alaska	TLC	
July 28	Running Wild with Bear Grylls	NBC	
July 29	Raising Asia	Lifetime	
July 30	Penn & Teller: Fool Us	The CW	
July 31	Mecum Dealmakers	NBCSN	
July 31	The Quest	ABC	
August 4	Bachelor in Paradise	ABC	
August 4	Partners	FX	
August 6	Skin Wars	GSN	
August 7	Extreme Guide to Parenting	Bravo	
August 7	Garfunkel and Oates	IFC	
August 7	Black Jesus	Adult Swim	
August 7	7 Deadly Sins	Showtime	
August 8	Jonah from Tonga	HBO	
August 8	The Knick	Cinemax	
August 8	Human Resources	Pivot	
August 9	Outlander	Starz	
August 10	Fat Guys in the Woods	Weather Channel	
August 12	Cement Heads	A&E	
August 12	4th & Loud	AMC	
August 12	The Singles Project	Bravo	
August 12	Idiotest	GSN	
August 13	Legends	TNT	
August 18	Dora and Friends: Into the City!	Nickelodeon	
August 19	Wizard Wars	Syfy	
August 22	BoJack Horseman	Netflix	
August 23	Intruders	BBC America	
August 31	Breathless	PBS	
September 1	Super Wings	Sprout	
September 6	The Flipside	Syndication	
September 7	Utopia	Fox	
September 8	The Meredith Vieira Show	Syndication	
September 8	Love Prison	A&E	
September 10	I Heart Nick Carter	VH1	
September 12	Z Nation	Syfy	
September 13	Nicky, Ricky, Dicky & Dawn	Nickelodeon	
September 14	Kourtney and Khloé Take The Hamptons	E!	
September 15	Love & Hip Hop: Hollywood	VH1	
September 15	Justice with Judge Mablean	Syndication	
September 15	Hot Bench	Syndication	
September 17	The Mysteries of Laura	NBC	
September 17	Red Band Society	Fox	
September 21	Madam Secretary	CBS	
September 21	Mr. Pickles	Adult Swim	
September 22	Celebrity Name Game	Syndication	
September 22	Forever	ABC	
September 22	Gotham	Fox	
September 22	Scorpion	CBS	
September 23	NCIS: New Orleans	CBS	
September 24	Sports Jeopardy!	Crackle	
September 24	Black-ish	ABC	
September 25	How to Get Away with Murder	ABC	
September 30	Manhattan Love Story	ABC	
September 30	Selfie	ABC	
October 1	Stalker	CBS	
October 2	A to Z	NBC	
October 2	Bad Judge	NBC	
October 2	Gracepoint	Fox	
October 2	Food Truck Face Off	Food Network	
October 2	Dead Again	A&E	
October 3	On the Menu	TNT	
October 4	Reluctantly Healthy	The CW	
October 4	Survivor's Remorse	Starz	
October 4	The Pinkertons	Syndication	
October 5	Manzo'd with Children	Bravo	
October 5	Mulaney	Fox	
October 6	Star Wars Rebels	Disney XD	
October 6	Max & Shred	Nickelodeon	
October 7	The Flash	The CW	
October 8	Somebody's Gotta Do It	CNN	
October 10	Cristela	ABC	
October 12	The Affair	Showtime	
October 13	Jane the Virgin	The CW	
October 13	Blaze and the Monster Machines	Nickelodeon	
October 13	Tiny & Shekinah's Weave Trip	VH1	
October 14	Marry Me	NBC	
October 15	Unlivable	Fyi	
October 20	Kirby Buckets	Disney XD	
October 21	The Grantland Basketball Show	ESPN	
October 23	Project Runway: Threads	Lifetime	
October 24	Constantine	NBC	
October 27	Mike Tyson Mysteries	Adult Swim	
October 27	Hair Jacked	truTV	
October 27	Fake Off	truTV	
October 28	How to Be a Grown Up	truTV	
October 28	Friends of the People	truTV	
October 28	Benched	USA	
October 30	The McCarthys	CBS	
November 3	Euros of Hollywood	Bravo	
November 3	K. Michelle: My Life	VH1	
November 4	Search for the Lost Giants	History	
November 5	Kitchen Inferno	Food Network	
November 6	Rainbow Brite	Hallmark Channel	
November 8	Sonic Boom	Cartoon Network	
November 12	Strip the Cosmos	Science Channel	
November 15	The Missing	Starz	
November 17	State of Affairs	NBC	
November 25	The Sisterhood	Lifetime	
November 26	Odd Squad	PBS Kids	
November 26	VeggieTales in the House	Netflix	
November 28	Momsters: When Moms Go Bad	Investigation Discovery	
December 2	Girlfriends' Guide to Divorce	Bravo	
December 5	Penn Zero: Part-Time Hero	Disney XD	
December 7	The Librarians	TNT	
December 12	Wake Up Call	TNT	
December 12	Marco Polo	Netflix	
December 15	React to That	Nickelodeon	
December 19	All Hail King Julien	Netflix	

=== Made-for-TV movies, television specials, and miniseries ===
Premiere date	Title	Channel	Source
January 1	House of Secrets	Lifetime Movie Network	
January 2	The Assets	ABC	
January 9	The Spoils of Babylon	IFC	
January 17	Cloud 9	Disney Channel	
January 18	Flowers in the Attic	Lifetime	
January 18	June in January	Hallmark Channel	
January 18	My Gal Sunday	Hallmark Movie Channel	
January 20	Klondike	Discovery Channel	
January 25	Lizzie Borden Took An Ax	Lifetime	
January 29	Fleming: The Man Who Would Be Bond	BBC America	
February 1	The Gabby Douglas Story	Lifetime	
March 8	The Trip to Bountiful	Lifetime	
March 8	A Ring by Spring	Hallmark Channel	
March 15	The Grim Sleeper	Lifetime	
April 5	Lucky in Love	Hallmark Channel	
April 19	A Lesson in Romance	Hallmark Channel	
April 20	In My Dreams	ABC	
May 5	24: Live Another Day	Fox	
May 10	Mom's Day Away	Hallmark Channel	
May 25	The Normal Heart	HBO	
May 25	Blood Lake: Attack of the Killer Lampreys	Animal Planet	
May 26	Petals on the Wind	Lifetime	
May 29	The Sixties	CNN	
June 17	I Love the 2000s	VH1	
June 27	Zapped	Disney Channel	
July 31	The Honourable Woman	SundanceTV	
July 31	Sharknado 2: The Second One	Syfy	
August 15	How to Build a Better Boy	Disney Channel	
October 25	The Good Witch's Wonder	Hallmark Channel	
November 1	One Starry Christmas	Hallmark Channel	
November 8	The Nine Lives of Christmas	Hallmark Channel	
November 9	A Cookie Cutter Christmas	Hallmark Channel	
November 15	Northpole	Hallmark Channel	
November 15	Aaliyah: The Princess of R&B	Lifetime	
November 22	Hello Ladies: The Movie	HBO	
November 22	A Royal Christmas	Hallmark Channel	
November 29	Christmas Under Wraps	Hallmark Channel	
November 30	A Christmas Mystery	ION Television	
December 2	Toy Story That Time Forgot	ABC	
December 4	Peter Pan Live!	NBC	
December 6	Debbie Macomber Mr. Miracle	Hallmark Channel	
December 7	Christmas at Cartwright's	Hallmark Channel	
December 7	Merry Ex-Mas	ION Television	
December 13	A Christmas Kiss II	ION Television	
December 13	Best Christmas Party Ever	Hallmark Channel	
December 14	The Christmas Parade	Hallmark Channel	
December 14	A Perfect Christmas List	ION Television	
December 14	Backstage with Disney on Broadway: Celebrating 20 Years	ABC	
December 15	Ascension	Syfy	
December 20	Back to Christmas	ION Television	
December 29	Confessions of the Boston Strangler	Investigation Discovery	

=== Programs changing networks ===
The following shows aired new episodes on a different network than previous first-run episodes.

Show	Moved from	Moved to	Source
American Dad!	Fox	TBS	
Blue	YouTube	Hulu / Fox.com	
Legit	FX	FXX	
Monsuno	Nicktoons	Hulu	
Wilfred	FX	FXX	
Those Who Kill	A&E	LMN	
Deadly Wives	Bio	LMN	
Giuliana & Bill	Style	E!	
The Tim Feriss Experiment	HLN	TruTV	
Gravity Falls	Disney Channel	Disney XD	
Wander Over Yonder	Disney Channel	Disney XD	
Hallmark Hall of Fame	ABC	Hallmark Channel	
Thursday Night Football	NFL Network	CBS & NFL Network	
Masters of Illusion	MyNetworkTV	The CW	

=== Returning this year ===
The following returned with new episodes after a previous cancellation or ended run:

Show	Last aired	Previous channel	New title	New/returning/same channel	Returning	Source
Inside Politics	2005	CNN	Same	Same	February 2	
24	2010	Fox	Same	Same	May 5	
Last Comic Standing	2010	NBC	Same	Same	May 22	
NY Med	2012	ABC	Same	Same	June 26	
Masters of Illusion	2009	MyNetworkTV	Same	The CW	June 26	
The Killing	2013	AMC	Same	Netflix	August 1	
Candid Camera	2004	Ion Television	Same	TV Land	August 1	
The Comeback	2005	HBO	Same	Same	November 9	
Hello Ladies	2013	HBO	Same	Same	November 22	

=== Milestone episodes ===
Show	Network	Episode #	Episode title	Episode air date	Source
Parks and Recreation	NBC	100th	"Second Chunce"	January 9	
American Masters	PBS	200th	Salinger	January 21	
The Vampire Diaries	The CW	100th	"500 Years of Solitude"	January 23	
How I Met Your Mother	CBS	200th	"How Your Mother Met Me"	January 27	
Adventure Time	Cartoon Network	150th	"Rattleballs"	January 27	
Criminal Minds	CBS	200th	"200"	February 5	
General Hospital	ABC	13,000th	N/A	February 24	
Jimmy Kimmel Live!	ABC	2,000th	N/A	February 24	
NCIS	CBS	250th	"Dressed to Kill"	March 4	
Glee	Fox	100th	"100"	March 18	
The Price Is Right	CBS	8,000th	"The Price Is Right 8000"	April 7	
Wheel of Fortune	First-run syndication	6,000th	College Week	April 11	
The Simpsons	Fox	550th	"Brick Like Me"	May 4	
Curious George	PBS Kids	100th	"Red Planet Monkey/Tortilla Express"	May 19	
24	Fox	200th	"Day 9: 6:00 PM-7:00 PM"	June 16	
Pretty Little Liars	ABC Family	100th	"Miss Me x 100"	July 8	
Regular Show	Cartoon Network	150th	"Thomas Fights Back"	July 24	
Hot in Cleveland	TV Land	100th	"Win Win"	August 27	
South Park	Comedy Central	250th	"The Cissy"	October 8	
Ridiculousness	MTV	100th	"100th Episode Special"	October 23	
The Amazing World of Gumball	Cartoon Network	100th	"The Man"	October 30	
Hawaii Five-0	CBS	100th	"Ina Paha (If Perhaps)"	November 7	
Supernatural	The CW	200th	"Fan Fiction"	November 11	
Shark Tank	ABC	100th	N/A	November 14	
Bones	Fox	200th	"The 200th in the 10th"	December 11	
Anger Management	FX	100th	"Charlie & The 100th Episode"	December 22	

=== Entering syndication this year ===
A list of programs (current or canceled) that have accumulated enough episodes (between 65 and 100) or seasons (3 or more) to be eligible for off-network syndication and/or basic cable runs.

Show	Seasons	In Production	Source
Raising Hope	4	No	
Anger Management	2	No	
Hot In Cleveland	5	Yes	
The Good Wife	5	Yes	
Blue Bloods	5	Yes	
Mike & Molly	5	Yes	
Cougar Town	6	Yes	
Scandal	3	Yes	

=== Ending this year ===
Date	Show	Channel	Debut	Status	Source
January 4	Brody Stevens: Enjoy It!	Comedy Central	2013	Cancelled	
January 6	Hostages	CBS	2013	Cancelled	
January 16	Eagleheart	Adult Swim	2011	Cancelled	
January 18	The Aquabats! Super Show!	The Hub	2012	Cancelled	
January 19	Betrayal	ABC	2013	Cancelled	
January 23	Sean Saves the World	NBC	2013	Cancelled	
January 23	The Michael J. Fox Show	NBC	2013	Cancelled	
January 24	Dracula	NBC	2013	Cancelled	
January 31	The Carrie Diaries	The CW	2013	Cancelled	
February 4	Ravenswood	ABC Family	2013	Cancelled	
February 5	Operation Repo	truTV	2008	Cancelled	
February 6	Showbiz Tonight	HLN	2005	Cancelled	
February 6	The Tonight Show with Jay Leno	NBC	1992	Ended	
February 7	Late Night with Jimmy Fallon	NBC	2009	Ended	
February 8	Monsters vs. Aliens	Nickelodeon	2013	Cancelled	
February 16	Good Luck Charlie	Disney Channel	2010	Ended	
February 18	Killer Women	ABC	2014	Cancelled	
February 19	Super Fun Night	ABC	2013	Cancelled	
February 26	Kirstie	TV Land	2013	Cancelled	
March 3	Almost Human	Fox	2013	Cancelled	
March 12	Men at Work	TBS	2012	Cancelled	
March 21	A.N.T. Farm	Disney Channel	2011	Cancelled	
March 25	Mind Games	ABC	2014	Cancelled	
March 26	Psych (returned in 2017, 2020, and 2021 as a film series)	USA Network	2006	Cancelled	
March 26	Strip the City	Science Channel	2012	Ended	
March 28	Piers Morgan Live	CNN	2011	Cancelled	
March 28	The Kudlow Report	CNBC	2009	Cancelled	
March 31	Chozen	FX	2014	Cancelled	
March 31	Intelligence	CBS	2014	Cancelled	
March 31	How I Met Your Mother	CBS	2005	Ended	
April 1	Twisted	ABC Family	2013	Cancelled	
April 3	Once Upon a Time in Wonderland	ABC	2013	Ended	
April 4	Fish Hooks	Disney Channel	2010	Ended	
April 4	Raising Hope	Fox	2010	Cancelled	
April 7	Being Human	Syfy	2011	Cancelled	
April 10	Under the Gunn	Lifetime	2014	Cancelled	
April 11	The Neighbors	ABC	2012	Cancelled	
April 17	The Crazy Ones	CBS	2013	Cancelled	
April 28	The Artie Lange Show	Audience	2011	Cancelled	
April 29	Game of Arms	AMC	2014	Cancelled	
May 5	The Tomorrow People	The CW	2013	Cancelled	
May 8	Saint George	FX	2014	Cancelled	
May 9	BrainSurge	Nicktoons	2009	Cancelled	
May 12	Star-Crossed	The CW	2014	Cancelled	
May 13	Trophy Wife	ABC	2013	Cancelled	
May 14	Suburgatory	ABC	2011	Cancelled	
May 14	Legit	FXX	2013	Cancelled	
May 15	Surviving Jack	Fox	2014	Cancelled	
May 17	Spooksville	The Hub	2013	Cancelled	
May 18	Those Who Kill	LMN	2014	Cancelled	
May 19	Warehouse 13	Syfy	2009	Ended	
May 19	Bam's Bad Ass Game Show	TBS	2014	Cancelled	
May 21	Revolution	NBC	2012	Cancelled	
May 21	The Trisha Goddard Show	Syndication	2012	Cancelled	
May 21	The Arsenio Hall Show	Syndication	1989	Cancelled	
May 21	The Test	Syndication	2013	Cancelled	
May 21	Judge Alex	Syndication	2005	Cancelled	
May 21	Mixology	ABC	2014	Cancelled	
May 22	Bad Teacher	CBS	2014	Cancelled	
May 26	Friends with Better Lives	CBS	2014	Cancelled	
June 1	Disrupt with Karen Finney	MSNBC	2013	Cancelled	
June 7	Sabrina: Secrets of a Teenage Witch	The Hub	2013	Cancelled	
June 10	Bad Sex	Logo	2014	Cancelled	
June 10	Riot	Fox	2014	Cancelled	
June 11	I Wanna Marry "Harry"	Fox	2014	Cancelled	
June 11	Growing Up Fisher	NBC	2014	Cancelled	
June 15	Believe	NBC	2014	Cancelled	
June 19	The Pete Holmes Show	TBS	2013	Cancelled	
June 21	Crisis	NBC	2014	Cancelled	
June 22	Enlisted	Fox	2014	Cancelled	
June 22	Drop Dead Diva	Lifetime	2009	Ended	
June 23	The Boondocks	Adult Swim	2005	Ended	
June 24	Small Town Security	AMC	2012	Cancelled	
June 24	Freakshow	AMC	2013	Cancelled	
June 27	Bethenny	Syndication	2012	Cancelled	
June 27	Rake	Fox	2014	Cancelled	
June 29	Californication	Showtime	2007	Cancelled	
July 1	Famous in 12	The CW	2014	Ended	
July 12	Fanboy & Chum Chum	Nickelodeon	2009	Ended	
July 13	NASCAR on TNT	TNT	2001	Ended	
July 16	Dads	Fox	2013	Cancelled	
July 17	Sam & Cat	Nickelodeon	2013	Cancelled	
July 19	Bet on Your Baby	ABC	2013	Cancelled	
July 20	Superjail!	Adult Swim	2007	Cancelled	
July 24	Black Box	ABC	2014	Cancelled	
July 28	CeeLo Green's The Good Life	TBS	2014	Cancelled	
July 30	Katie	Syndication	2012	Cancelled	
August 1	The Killing	Netflix	2011	Ended	
August 2	Crossbones	NBC	2014	Cancelled	
August 6	Crossfire	CNN	1982	Cancelled	
August 12	Crash & Bernstein	Disney XD	2012	Cancelled	
August 13	Wilfred	FXX	2011	Ended	
August 14	Gang Related	Fox	2014	Cancelled	
August 14	Here Comes Honey Boo Boo	TLC	2012	Cancelled	
August 15	Funniest Wins	TBS	2014	Cancelled	
August 24	True Blood	HBO	2008	Ended	
August 26	Chelsea Lately	E!	2007	Cancelled	
August 27	Mystery Girls	ABC Family	2014	Cancelled	
August 27	The Divide	WE	2014	Cancelled	
August 31	MDA Show of Strength	ABC	1966	Cancelled	
September 1	Partners	FX	2014	Cancelled	
September 5	America Now	Syndication	2010	Cancelled	
September 7	Wipeout (returned in 2021)	ABC	2008	Cancelled	
September 9	Sullivan & Son	TBS	2012	Cancelled	
September 12	Kitchen Nightmares (returned in 2023)	Fox	2007	Ended	
September 13	Reckless	CBS	2014	Cancelled	
September 18	Rush	USA Network	2014	Cancelled	
September 22	Dallas	TNT	2012	Cancelled	
September 28	The Lottery	Lifetime	2012	Cancelled	
October 1	The Bridge	FX	2013	Cancelled	
October 5	Witches of East End	Lifetime	2013	Cancelled	
October 7	Matador	El Rey Network	2014	Cancelled	
October 13	Jane Velez-Mitchell	HLN	2008	Cancelled	
October 14	4th and Loud	AMC	2014	Cancelled	
October 26	Boardwalk Empire	HBO	2010	Ended	
October 31	Utopia	Fox	2014	Cancelled	
November 9	Family Game Night	The Hub	2010	Cancelled	
November 14	Ben 10: Omniverse	Cartoon Network	2012	Ended	
November 16	NASCAR on ESPN	ABC/ESPN/ESPN2	2007	Ended	
November 18	Martha Speaks	PBS Kids	2008	Ended	
November 22	Hello Ladies	HBO	2013	Cancelled	
November 22	Power Rangers Megaforce	Nickelodeon	2013	Ended	
December 4	Manhattan Love Story	ABC	2014	Cancelled	
December 9	Sons of Anarchy	FX	2008	Ended	
December 14	The Newsroom	HBO	2012	Ended	
December 18	White Collar	USA Network	2009	Ended	
December 18	Covert Affairs	USA Network	2010	Cancelled	
December 18	Project Runway: Threads	Lifetime	2014	Cancelled	
December 18	The Colbert Report	Comedy Central	2005	Ended	
December 19	The Late Late Show with Craig Ferguson	CBS	2005	Ended	
December 19	The Legend of Korra	Nick.com	2012	Ended	
December 19	106 & Park	BET	2000	Cancelled	
December 19	Deal with It	TBS	2013	Cancelled	
December 25	Johnny Test (returned in 2021)	Cartoon Network	2005	Ended	
December 26	First Business	Syndication	1989	Ended	
December 28	The Comeback (returned in 2026)	HBO	2005	Ended	
December 30	Benched	USA Network	2014	Cancelled	
December 30	Selfie	ABC	2014	Cancelled	

== Networks and services ==
=== Launches ===
Network	Type	Launch date	Notes	Source
GetTV	OTA Multicast	February 3		
Pluto TV	FAST streaming service	March 31		
The Works	Cable television	April 1		
Tubi	OTT streaming service	April 16		
Newsmax TV	Cable television	June 16		
SEC Network	Cable television	August 14		
Escape	OTA Multicast	August 18		
Grit	OTA Multicast	August 18		
Heroes & Icons	OTA Multicast	September 28		
CBS All Access	OTT streaming service	October 28		
Rev'n	Cable television	December 1		

=== Conversions and rebrandings ===
Old network name	New network name	Type	Conversion date	Notes	Source
JCTV	JUCE TV	OTA Muiticast	January 1		
The Pentagon Channel	DoD News Channel	Cable television	July 8		
Hub Network	Discovery Family	Cable television	October 14		
Exitos TV	TeleXitos	Cable television	November 30		

=== Closures ===
Network	Type	Closure date	Notes	Source
3net	Cable television	August 12		
G4	Cable television	December 31		

== Television stations ==
=== Sign-ons ===
Date	Market	Station	Channel	affiliation	Source
March 4	Bowling Green, Kentucky	WCZU-LD	39.1; 39.2	Antenna TV/MyNetworkTV; Doctor TV	
March 4	Jackson, Tennessee	WYJJ-LD	27.1; 27.2	Soul of the South Network/MyNetworkTV; Doctor TV	
March 4	Montgomery, Alabama	WDSF-LD	19.1; 19.2	DrTV/MyNetworkTV; DrTV	
August 4	Milwaukee	WISN-DT2	12.2	Movies!	
September 1	Wheeling, West Virginia/Steubenville, Ohio	WTOV-DT3	9.3	MeTV (Moved from 9.2, which now carries Fox programming)	
October 2	Jackson, Tennessee	WNBJ-LD	39.1	NBC	

=== Changes of network affiliation ===
The following is a list of television stations that have made noteworthy network affiliation changes in 2014.

Date	Market	Station	Channel	Prior affiliation	New affiliation	Source
January 1	Madison, Wisconsin	WMTV	15.2	The Local AccuWeather Channel	WeatherNation TV	
January 1	Phoenix, Arizona	KNXV-TV	15.2	Live Well Network	Antenna TV	
January 1	Salt Lake City, Utah	KSL-TV	5.2	Live Well Network	Cozi TV	
February 10	East St. Louis, Illinois/St. Louis	WRBU	46.1	MyNetworkTV	Ion Television	
February 10	Columbia, South Carolina	WZRB	47.1	The CW	Ion Television (CW remained as temporary secondary)	
February 28	St. Petersburg-Tampa	WTSP	10.2	Local automated weather	Antenna TV	
March 17	Columbia, South Carolina	WKTC	63.1	MyNetworkTV	The CW (MyNetworkTV remained as secondary affiliation; displaced WZRB as CW affiliate)	
April 1	Seattle, Washington	KIRO-TV	7.2	Retro Television Network	GetTV	
April 1	Tulsa, Oklahoma	KMYT-TV	41.2	ZUUS Country	GetTV	
April 21	West Palm Beach, Florida	WPTV-TV	5.2	Live Well Network	MeTV	
June 13	Superior, Nebraska; Lincoln/Grand Island	KSNB-TV; KOLN/KGIN	4.1 & 4.2; 10.2 & 11.2	MyNetworkTV/MeTV, Antenna TV on DT2	NBC (MyNetworkTV/Me-TV to KSNB-DT2 only, Antenna TV removed)	
June 13	Rehoboth Beach, Delaware	WRDE-LD	59.1	MyNetworkTV/Cozi TV	NBC (MyNetworkTV/Cozi TV moves to digital channel 59.2)	
June 13	Bismarck, North Dakota; Dickinson, North Dakota	KFYR-DT2/KQCD-DT2	5.2 & 7.2	MeTV	Fox	
July 14	St. Croix, Virgin Islands	WCVI	23.1	The CW	LeSEA/World Harvest Television	
September 1	Wheeling, West Virginia/Steubenville, Ohio	WTOV-DT2	9.2	MeTV (Moves to new subchannel)	Fox	
September 1	Wheeling, West Virginia/Steubenville, Ohio	WTRF-DT2	7.2	Fox	MyNetworkTV (moves from secondary to primary)	
September 1	Toledo, Ohio	WTVG-DT2	13.2	Live Well Network	The CW (schedule and affiliation transferred from cable-only WT05)	
November 14	Puerto Rico	WORA-DT2	5.2	Independent (Music videos; moved to channel 5.3)	ABC	
November 14	Puerto Rico	WSJP-LD	18.1	ABC (English Language programming)	Simulcast of WORA-DT2	
November 17	St. Louis, Missouri	KMOV	4.3	Live Well Network/dark	MyNetworkTV	

=== Sign-offs ===
Date	Market	Station	Channel	Affiliation	Sign-on date	Source
June 13	Hastings, Nebraska	KHAS-TV	5.1 & 5.2	NBC & Cozi TV	January 1, 1956	
June 13	Bismarck, North Dakota; Minot, North Dakota	KNDX/KXND	26.1 & 24.1	Fox	KNDX: November 7, 1999; KXND: November 15, 1999	
September 1	Toledo, Ohio	WT05	5; local cable-only	The CW	1971	

== See also ==
- 2014 in the United States
- List of American films of 2014
