= Karen Finney =

American political consultant

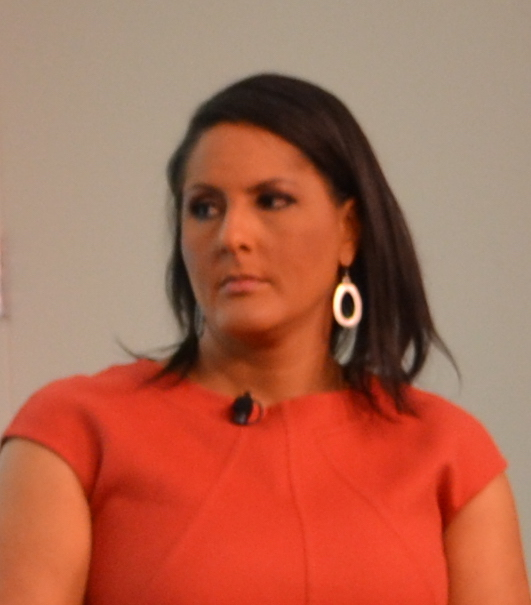
- Finney in 2015

Personal details
- Born: August 15, 1967 (age 59) New York, U.S.
- Party: Democratic
- Education: University of California, Los; Angeles (BA)

Karen Finney (born August 15, 1967) is an American political consultant and political commentator for CNN. Finney previously served as a spokesperson for Hilary Clinton's 2016 presidential campaign. She was also a political commentator for MSNBC and host of the show Disrupt with Karen Finney (2013–2014). She was also the first African-American Director of Communications for the Democratic National Committee, leading their successful "50-state strategy" during the 2006 midterm elections.

== Early life and education ==
Finney was born in New York to an African-American father who worked as a civil rights lawyer and a white mother who worked as a labor negotiator. Through her mother, she is related to the Confederate Civil War general, Robert E. Lee. As a child, she moved to California with her mother, where she later attended the University of California, Los Angeles.

== Career ==
Finney served four years as the spokesperson and Director of Communications at the Democratic National Committee. She has also written for The Hill, is a commentator for Politico, MSNBC, and The Huffington Post.

Finney served as Press Secretary for Hillary Clinton in the early 1990s. She then moved into the private sector, working in marketing for the Scholastic Corporation.

In 2001, she managed crisis communications for the New York City Panel for Educational Policy, and worked for Elizabeth Edwards during the John Edwards 2004 presidential campaign.

On April 2, 2013, it was announced that Finney would host a weekend news program called Disrupt with Karen Finney on MSNBC. On June 5, 2014, it was announced that Finney's weekend news program was cancelled.

On November 25, 2014 Finney joined Media Matters for America as a senior fellow and consultant.

On April 6, 2015, CNN announced that she was selected as Strategic Communications Adviser and Senior Spokesperson for the Hillary Clinton 2016 presidential campaign.

On January 6, 2019, she made her debut as a CNN political commentator.
