= Buying Naked =

American television series

- Genre: Reality
- Country of origin: United States
- Original language: English
- No. of seasons: 1
- No. of episodes: 10

Production
- Running time: 22 minutes

Original release
- Network: TLC
- Release: November 20, 2013 – July 19, 2014

Buying Naked is an American reality television show that premiered on TLC, on November 20, 2013. The show follows real estate agent Jackie Youngblood as she shows homes in clothing optional communities to house-hunting nudists.

== Episodes ==
=== Pilot episodes (2013) ===
| No. | Title | Original release date | U.S. viewers (millions) |
|---|---|---|---|
| 1 | "Nudey-wed's First Home" | November 20, 2013 | N/A |
| 2 | "Nudists Fetch a Home" | November 20, 2013 | N/A |

=== Season 1 (2014) ===
| No. | Title | Original release date | U.S. viewers (millions) |
|---|---|---|---|
| 3 | "Brave Nude World" | June 28, 2014 | N/A |
| 4 | "The Big Bust" | June 28, 2014 | N/A |
| 5 | "Nude to the Neighborhood" | July 5, 2014 | N/A |
| 6 | "Skinny Dip Sunday" | July 5, 2014 | N/A |
| 7 | "Bowling in the Buff" | July 12, 2014 | N/A |
| 8 | "Northern Exposure" | July 12, 2014 | N/A |
| 9 | "Broadcast Nudes" | July 19, 2014 | N/A |
| 10 | "Something Borrowed, Something Nude" | July 19, 2014 | N/A |
