= Extreme Guide to Parenting =

Television series

- Genre: Reality television
- Country of origin: United States
- Original language: English
- No. of seasons: 1
- No. of episodes: 6

Production
- Executive producers: Amelia D'Entrone; Craig D'Entrone; Lauren Lazin
- Running time: 19–22 minutes
- Production company: Punched in the Head Productions

Original release
- Network: Bravo
- Release: August 7 – September 18, 2014

Extreme Guide to Parenting is an American reality television series that premiered August 7, 2014, on Bravo. Each episode features different households with alternative styles of raising their children.

== Episodes ==
No.	Title	Original release date
1	"The Indigo Child & the Coddled Todler"	August 7, 2014
2	"The Wanderers"	August 14, 2014
3	"The Smartest, Most Handsome, Best Kid Ever"	August 21, 2014
4	"The Highly Disciplined Warriors & The Total Package"	August 28, 2014
5	"The Mind Controller & The Body Positive Baby"	September 11, 2014
6	"The Everything-on-Demand Baby"	September 18, 2014

== Reception ==
Extreme Guide to Parenting has received mixed reviews with a score of 55 based on 4 reviews. Allison Keene of The Hollywood Reporter was positive about the show and noted that it "manages to hit upon some universal parenting problems." Brian Lowry of Variety said the show has the potential to become the guiltiest of pleasures. Rob Owen of Pittsburgh Post-Gazette, however, was more critical and said that the show could have worked but was "ruined by an over-long running time."
