= Unlivable =

- Genre: Reality television
- Starring: April Glover; Gary Stein
- Country of origin: United States
- Original language: English
- No. of seasons: 1
- No. of episodes: 8

Original release
- Network: Fyi
- Release: October 15 – December 8, 2014

Unlivable is an American television series airing on the Fyi network. The show features April "Bama" Glover and Gary Stein working together to makeover houses across America.

== Broadcast ==
The eight-episode series premiered in the U.S. on the Fyi network on October 15, 2014.

Internationally, the series premiered in Australia on May 1, 2015 on LifeStyle Home.

== Episodes ==
| No. | Title | Original release date |
|---|---|---|
| 1 | "Kurt & Emily" | October 15, 2014 |
| 2 | "Ryan & Chelsea" | October 15, 2014 |
| 3 | "Todd & Camille" | October 22, 2014 |
| 4 | "Steve & Krystle" | October 29, 2014 |
| 5 | "Matt & Jenn" | November 17, 2014 |
| 6 | "Sean & Sandy" | November 24, 2014 |
| 7 | "Colin & Deborah" | December 1, 2014 |
| 8 | "Jose & Monica" | December 8, 2014 |
