= Disrupt with Karen Finney =

- Genre: Current affairs, political commentary
- Presented by: Karen Finney
- Country of origin: United States
- Original language: English

Production
- Camera setup: Multi-camera
- Running time: 60 minutes

Original release
- Network: MSNBC
- Release: June 8, 2013 – June 1, 2014

Related
- MSNBC Live

Disrupt with Karen Finney is a political news and commentary television program that aired weekends at 4:00 p.m. ET on MSNBC from 2013 to 2014. It was hosted by Karen Finney, a Democratic political operative who had been a political commentator at MSNBC since 2009. The show debuted on June 8, 2013, and had its final broadcast June 1, 2014.

== Format ==
The show ran from 4:00 to 5:00 p.m. on MSNBC weekends. In its first two months, it led into The Ed Show.

== History ==
Finney had been a political commentator and guest host on MSNBC programs since 2009. Prior to that, she had worked on four campaigns, had served as deputy press secretary to Hillary Clinton during the Clinton presidency, and had served as a spokeswoman for the Democratic National Committee. Finney stopped her consultant work upon starting the show.

Her show was the second weekend MSNBC program to feature an African American host, after Melissa Harris-Perry.

Finney's show was announced without a title on April 2, 2013. The promotion came amidst a series of programming changes at MSNBC, including an effort to improve weekend programming. Disrupt was originally scheduled to premiere on May 11, 2013, but was later rescheduled for June 8, 2013. The premiere opened with a discussion on "the conservative war on women", and her first guest was U.S. Senator Barbara Boxer.

The show was cancelled after its June 1, 2014 showing due to low ratings.

Preceded by MSNBC Live	MSNBC Weekend Lineup; 4:00 p.m. – 5:00 p.m. (ET)	Succeeded by The Ed Show
