= Escape Club (TV series) =

- Genre: Reality television
- Starring: Andrew Dean; Aundre Dean; Donny Ghilardi; Elly Kho; Jesse Blum; Lisa Baldassare; Lisa Tursini; Matt Heagy; Meagan Reedy; P'etra Davis; Stephen Bamber; Whitney Coulas
- Country of origin: United States
- Original language: English
- No. of seasons: 1
- No. of episodes: 8

Production
- Running time: 60 minutes

Original release
- Network: E!
- Release: June 8 – July 29, 2014

Escape Club is an American reality television series that premiered on Sunday, June 8, at 10:00 pm ET/9:00 pm Central on E!. The winner of the series would have their bills paid for one year.

== Cast ==
- Andrew Dean, 26
- Aundre Dean, 24
- Donny Ghilardi, 29
- Elly Kho, 31
- Jesse Blum, 28
- Lisa Baldassare, 25
- Lisa Tursini, 25
- Matt Heagy, 34
- Meagan Reedy, 26
- P'etra Davis, 22
- Stephen Bamber, 28
- Whitney Coulas, 25

== Elimination order ==
#	Contestants	Episodes							
#	Contestants	1	2	3	4	5	6	7	8
1	Donny	Donny	Donny	Donny	Donny	Donny	Donny	Donny	Donny
2	Jesse	Jesse	Jesse	Jesse	Jesse	Jesse	Jesse	Jesse	Jesse
3	Andrew	Andrew	Andrew	Andrew	Andrew	Andrew	Andrew	Andrew	Andrew
4	Lisa B.	Lisa B.	Lisa B.	Lisa B.	Lisa B.	Lisa B.	Lisa B.	Lisa B.	Lisa B.
5	Meagan	Meagan	Meagan	Meagan	Meagan	Meagan	Meagan	Meagan	Meagan
6	Elly	Elly					Elly	Elly	
7	Aundre	Aundre	Aundre	Aundre	Aundre	Aundre	Aundre		Aundre
8	Whitney	Whitney	Whitney	Whitney	Whitney	Whitney			Whitney
9	P'etra	P'etra	P'etra	P'etra	P'etra				P'etra
10	Matt	Matt	Matt	Matt					Matt
11	Lisa T.	Lisa T.	Lisa T.						Lisa T.
12	Stephen	Stephen	Stephen						Stephen

(WINNER) The contestant received the most votes and won the competition.
(RUNNER-UP) The contestant received the second highest number of votes and was the runner-up.
The contestant received the most votes and was eliminated.
The contestant decided to leave the competition.
The contestant had someone from their past come visit the house.
The contestant was eliminated, but later voted back into the house.
The contestant was never eliminated, but did not win the competition.
The contestant was eliminated, but returned for the finale.

== Episodes ==
Escape Club season 1 episodes
No.	Title	Original release date	Prod. code	US viewers (millions)
1	"You Can't Escape Your Life"	June 8, 2014	101	0.93
Eliminated: Elly Kho
2	"The Ex-Cape Club"	June 15, 2014	102	0.67
Whitney Coulas is shocked when her ex arrives on the island, forcing the escapees to realize that in order to move on, they may have to confront their past. Eliminated: Stephen Bamber & Lisa Tursini
3	"...And Keep Your Enemies Closer"	June 22, 2014	103	0.86
Eliminated: Matt Heagy
4	"Couples Retreat"	July 1, 2014	104	0.35
Eliminated: P'etra Davis
5	"Fool Me Once"	July 8, 2014	105	0.32
Eliminated: Whitney Coulas
6	"Guess Who's Back"	July 15, 2014	106	0.29
Eliminated: Aundre Dean
7	"Fight Club"	July 22, 2014	107	N/A
Eliminated: Elly Kho
8	"And The Winner Is"	July 29, 2014	108	N/A
Won: Donny Ghilardi
