= The Biggest Loser season 12 =

The Biggest Loser
- Season 12
- No. of episodes: 13

Release
- Original network: NBC
- Original release: September 20 – December 13, 2011

Season chronology
- ← Previous; Season 11 (Couples 4) Next → Season 13 (No Excuses)

The Biggest Loser: Battle of the Ages is the twelfth season of the NBC reality television series entitled The Biggest Loser. The contestants competed to win a $250,000 prize, which was awarded to John Rhode, the contestant with the highest percentage of weight lost. It premiered on September 20, 2011. Along with existing trainer Bob Harper, two new trainers (Anna Kournikova and Dolvett Quince.) joined this season. The 15 contestants this season were divided into three groups of five by their ages: those who are 30 and under were initially trained by Quince, those who are between 31–49 were initially trained by Harper, and those who are 50 and over were initially trained by Kournikova. This season marked the first time since season 5 that America did not have to vote on who would become a finalist. For the first time ever in Biggest Loser history, all 3 finalists were men.

== Contestants ==
| Contestant | Team | Trios | Status | Total votes |
|---|---|---|---|---|
| Debbie Lounds, 60, Ann Arbor, Michigan | Blue Team | | Eliminated Week 1 | 3/5 |
| Johnny Forger, 65, Canton, Massachusetts | Blue Team | | Eliminated Week 2 | 2/4 |
| Patrick Ferrari, 26, Albany, Oregon | Red Team | | Eliminated Week 3 | 3/5 |
| Mike Danley, 62, Spencerville, Indiana | Blue Team | | Eliminated Week 4 | 2/3 |
| Courtney Rainville, 24, Scottsdale, Arizona | Red Team | | Eliminated Week 5 | 3/4 |
| Jennifer Rumple, 39, Alameda, California | Black Team | | Eliminated Week 6 | 6/10 |
| Jessica Limpert, 26, Pittsburgh, Pennsylvania | Red Team | Red Team | Eliminated Week 7 | 4/6 |
| Joe Mitchell, 46, Knoxville, Tennessee | Black Team | Blue Team | Eliminated Week 8 | 3/5 |
| † Bonnie Griffin, 63, Picayune, Mississippi | Blue Team | Red Team | Eliminated Week 9 | 3/5 |
| Ramon Medeiros, Returned Wk. 12, 27, Florence, Colorado | Red Team | Blue Team | Eliminated Week 10 | 2/4 |
| Sunny Sinclair, 41, Frisco, Texas | Black Team | Blue Team | Eliminated Week 11 | 2/3 |
| Rebecca 'Becky' Comet, 51, Benton, Arkansas | Blue Team | Black Team | Eliminated Week 12 | ^{[R]} |
| Vencent 'Vinny' Hickerson, 27, Nashville, Tennessee | Red Team | Black Team | Eliminated Week 12 | ^{[R]} |
| Ramon Medeiros, 27, Florence, Colorado | Red Team | Blue Team | 2nd Runner-Up | |
| Antone Davis, 44, Knoxville, Tennessee | Black Team | Black Team | Runner-Up | |
| John Rhode, 40, Mesa, Arizona | Black Team | Red Team | Biggest Loser | |

The "Total Votes" column indicates the number of votes cast against the contestant when he/she was eliminated.
^[R] This contestant fell below the Red Line and was eliminated before the finale.

- The red team is contestants who are ages 30 and younger (trained by Dolvett Quince), the black team is contestants who are ages 31–49 (trained by Bob Harper), and the blue team is contestants who are ages 50 and older (trained by Anna Kournikova). As of Week 7, two contestants stayed on the same teams, while the remaining seven swapped teams.

== Weigh-ins ==
| Contestant | Age | Height | Starting BMI | Ending BMI | Start Weight | Week | | | | | | | | | | | | | Weight lost | Percentage lost |
| Contestant | Age | Height | Starting BMI | Ending BMI | Start Weight | 1 | 2 | 3 | 4 | 5 | 6 | 7 | 8 | 9 | 10 | 11 | 12 | Finale | Weight lost | Percentage lost |
|---|---|---|---|---|---|---|---|---|---|---|---|---|---|---|---|---|---|---|---|---|
| John | 40 | 6'4" | 54.2 | 27.4 | 445 | 408 | 393 | 375 | 366 | 354 | 344 | 329 | 319 | 310 | 305 | 296 | 267 | 225 | 220 | 49.44% |
| Antone | 44 | 6'5" | 53.0 | 29.1 | 447 | 415 | 405 | 389 | 381 | 377 | 369 | 353 | 348 | 339 | 331 | 323 | 293 | 245 | 202 | 45.19% |
| Ramon | 27 | 5'11" | 49.5 | 28.0 | 355 | 338 | 329 | 322 | 311 | 304 | 302 | 286 | 280 | 273 | 268 | | 239 | 201 | 154 | 43.38% |
| Vinny | 27 | 6'0" | 57.8 | 32.8 | 426 | 405 | 400 | 390 | 382 | 372 | 367 | 355 | 345 | 335 | 324 | 314 | 286 | 242 | 184 | 43.19% |
| Becky | 51 | 5'6" | 38.4 | 24.2 | 238 | 228 | 223 | 214 | 212 | 204 | 203 | 192 | 186 | 182 | 177 | 172 | 162 | 150 | 88 | 36.97% |
| Sunny | 41 | 5'8" | 42.1 | 26.0 | 277 | 261 | 255 | 245 | 241 | 227 | 232 | 218 | 216 | 207 | 202 | 201 | | 171 | 106 | 38.27% |
| Bonnie | 63 | 5'4" | 43.6 | 30.4 | 254 | 250 | 247 | 240 | 233 | 229 | 228 | 221 | 213 | 208 | | | | 177 | 77 | 30.31% |
| Joe | 46 | 5'10" | 49.9 | 30.8 | 348 | 326 | 324 | 307 | 301 | 294 | 286 | 271 | 269 | | | | | 215 | 133 | 38.22% |
| Jessica | 26 | 5'8" | 38.6 | 26.5 | 254 | 239 | 232 | 221 | 219 | 213 | 209 | 201 | | | | | | 174 | 80 | 31.50% |
| Jennifer | 39 | 5'7" | 51.7 | 29.0 | 330 | 311 | 305 | 289 | 282 | 274 | 270 | | | | | | | 185 | 145 | 43.94% |
| Courtney | 24 | 5'6" | 43.6 | 29.5 | 270 | 254 | 247 | 240 | 237 | 231 | | | | | | | | 183 | 87 | 32.22% |
| Mike | 62 | 5'11" | 43.1 | 31.5 | 309 | 297 | 290 | 273 | 268 | | | | | | | | | 226 | 83 | 26.86% |
| Patrick | 26 | 6'2" | 49.7 | 30.3 | 387 | 367 | 361 | 350 | | | | | | | | | | 236 | 151 | 39.02% |
| Johnny | 65 | 6'0" | 44.5 | 31.3 | 328 | 311 | 313 | | | | | | | | | | | 231 | 97 | 29.57% |
| Debbie | 60 | 5'6" | 38.6 | 33.2 | 239 | 233 | | | | | | | | | | | | 206 | 33 | 13.81% |

Notes

- The Black Team is trained by Bob, the Red Team is trained by Dolvett, and the Blue Team is trained by Anna.
- Sunny's 6.03% weight loss in week 7 was counted as −3.96% due to her weight gain the previous week so Becky's valid −5.42% weight loss made her the biggest loser of the week.

Standings
Week's Biggest Loser (Team or Individuals)
Week's Biggest Loser & Immunity
Immunity (Challenge or Weigh-In)
One of the last two people eliminated before the finale
Results from At-Home players

BMI
Underweight (less than 18.5 BMI)
Normal (18.5 – 24.9 BMI)
Overweight (25 – 29.9 BMI)
Obese Class I (30 – 34.9 BMI)
Obese Class II (35 – 39.9 BMI)
Obese Class III (greater than 40 BMI)

Winners
$250,000 Winner (among the finalists)
$100,000 Winner (among the eliminated contestants)

== Weigh-In Figures History ==
| Contestant | Week | | | | | | | | | | | | |
| Contestant | 1 | 2 | 3 | 4 | 5 | 6 | 7 | 8 | 9 | 10 | 11 | 12 | Finale |
|---|---|---|---|---|---|---|---|---|---|---|---|---|---|
| John | −37 | −15 | −18 | −9 | −12 | −10 | −15 | −10 | −9 | −5 | −9 | −29 | −42 |
| Antone | −32 | −10 | −16 | −8 | −4 | −8 | −16 | −5 | −9 | −8 | −8 | −30 | −48 |
| Ramon | −17 | −9 | −7 | −11 | −7 | −2 | −16 | −6 | −7 | −5 | -29 | | −38 |
| Vinny | −21 | −5 | −10 | −8 | −10 | −5 | −12 | −10 | −10 | −11 | −10 | −28 | -44 |
| Becky | −10 | −5 | −9 | −2 | −8 | −1 | −11 | −6 | −4 | −5 | −5 | −10 | -12 |
| Sunny | −16 | −6 | −10 | −4 | −14 | +5 | −14 | −2 | −9 | −5 | −1 | -30 | |
| Bonnie | −4 | −3 | −7 | −7 | −4 | −1 | −7 | −8 | −5 | -31 | | | |
| Joe | −22 | −2 | −17 | −6 | −7 | −8 | −15 | −2 | -54 | | | | |
| Jessica | −15 | −7 | −11 | −2 | −6 | −4 | −8 | -27 | | | | | |
| Jennifer | −19 | −6 | −16 | −7 | −8 | −4 | -85 | | | | | | |
| Courtney | −16 | −7 | −7 | −3 | −6 | -48 | | | | | | | |
| Mike | −12 | −7 | −17 | −5 | -45 | | | | | | | | |
| Patrick | −20 | −6 | −11 | -114 | | | | | | | | | |
| Johnny | −17 | +2 | -82 | | | | | | | | | | |
| Debbie | −6 | -27 | | | | | | | | | | | |

Notes

- Sunny's 14 lb. weight loss in week 7 was displayed as 9 lbs. due to her weight gain the previous week.
- Bonnie's 5 lb. weight loss in week 9 was displayed as 4 lbs. due to the one lb. disadvantage.
- Vinny's 11 lb. weight loss in week 10 was displayed as 14 lbs. due to the three lb. advantage.
- John's 5 lb. weight loss in week 10 was displayed as 6 lbs. due to the one lb. advantage.
- Sunny's 5 lb. weight loss in week 10 was displayed as 4 lbs. due to the one lb. disadvantage.
- John's 9 lb. weight loss in week 11 was displayed as 10 lbs. due to the one lb. advantage.

== Weigh-In Percentage History ==
| Contestant | Week | | | | | | | | | | | | |
| Contestant | 1 | 2 | 3 | 4 | 5 | 6 | 7 | 8 | 9 | 10 | 11 | 12 | Finale |
|---|---|---|---|---|---|---|---|---|---|---|---|---|---|
| John | −8.31% | −3.68% | −4.58% | −2.40% | −3.28% | −2.82% | −4.36% | −3.04% | −2.82% | −1.61% | −2.95% | −9.80% | −15.73% |
| Antone | −7.16% | −2.41% | −3.95% | −2.06% | −1.05% | −2.12% | −4.34% | −1.42% | −2.59% | −2.63% | −2.42% | −9.29% | −16.38% |
| Ramon | −4.79% | −2.66% | −2.13% | −3.42% | −2.25% | −0.66% | −5.30% | −2.10% | −2.50% | −1.83% | -10.82% | | −15.90% |
| Vinny | −4.93% | −1.23% | −2.50% | −2.05% | −2.62% | −1.34% | −3.27% | −2.82% | −2.90% | −3.28% | −3.09% | −8.92% | -15.38% |
| Becky | −4.20% | −2.19% | −4.04% | −0.93% | −3.77% | −0.49% | −5.42% | −2.75% | −2.15% | −3.13% | −2.99% | −5.81% | -7.41% |
| Sunny | −5.78% | −2.30% | −3.92% | −1.63% | −5.81% | +2.20% | −6.03% | −0.92% | −4.17% | −2.42% | −0.50% | -14.93% | |
| Bonnie | −1.57% | −1.20% | −2.83% | −2.92% | −1.72% | −0.44% | −3.07% | −3.62% | −2.35% | -14.90% | | | |
| Joe | −6.32% | −0.61% | −5.25% | −1.95% | −2.33% | −2.72% | −5.24% | −0.74% | -20.07% | | | | |
| Jessica | −5.91% | −2.93% | −4.74% | −0.90% | −2.74% | −1.88% | −3.83% | -13.43% | | | | | |
| Jennifer | −5.76% | −1.93% | −5.25% | −2.42% | −2.84% | −1.46% | -31.48% | | | | | | |
| Courtney | −5.93% | −2.76% | −2.83% | −1.25% | −2.53% | -20.78% | | | | | | | |
| Mike | −3.88% | −2.36% | −5.86% | −1.83% | -16.79% | | | | | | | | |
| Patrick | −5.17% | −1.63% | −3.05% | -32.57% | | | | | | | | | |
| Johnny | −5.18% | +0.64% | -26.20% | | | | | | | | | | |
| Debbie | −2.51% | -11.59% | | | | | | | | | | | |

Notes

- Sunny's 6.03% weight loss in week 7 was counted as −3.96% due to her weight gain the previous week.
- Bonnie's 2.35% weight loss in week 9 was counted as −1.88% due to the one pound disadvantage.
- John's 1.61% weight loss in week 10 was counted as −1.94% due to the one pound advantage.
- Vinny's 3.28% weight loss in week 10 was counted as −4.18% due to the three pound advantage.
- Sunny's 2.42% weight loss in week 10 was counted as −1.93% due to the one pound disadvantage.
- John's 2.95% weight loss in week 11 was counted as −3.28% due to the one pound advantage.

== Elimination voting history ==
| Contestant | Week 1 | Week 2 | Week 3 | Week 4 | Week 5 | Week 6 | Week 7 | Week 8 | Week 9 | Week 10 | Week 11 | Week 12 | Finale |
| Eliminated | Debbie | Johnny | Patrick | Mike | Courtney | Jennifer | Jessica | Joe | Bonnie | Ramon | Sunny | Becky | None |
| Eliminated | Debbie | Johnny | Patrick | Mike | Courtney | Jennifer | Jessica | Joe | Bonnie | Ramon | Sunny | Vinny | None |
|---|---|---|---|---|---|---|---|---|---|---|---|---|---|
| John | X | X | X | X | X | Ramon | X | ? | Bonnie | Sunny | Sunny | X | Biggest Loser |
| Antone | X | X | X | X | X | Jennifer | Jessica | Joe | ? | Ramon | X | X | Runner-up |
| Ramon | X | X | Patrick | X | Courtney | Jennifer | Bonnie | X | ? | X | Eliminated Week 10, Returned at Finale | | 2nd Runner-up |
| Vinny | X | X | Courtney | X | Courtney | Jennifer | Bonnie | Joe | Bonnie | Sunny | ? | X | Eliminated Week 12 |
| Becky | Debbie | Johnny | X | Mike | X | ? | Jessica | ? | X | Ramon | Sunny | X | Eliminated Week 12 |
| Sunny | X | X | X | X | X | Jennifer | Jessica | X | Bonnie | X | X | Eliminated Week 11 | |
| Bonnie | Debbie | Johnny | X | Mike | X | ? | X | Joe | X | Eliminated Week 9 | | | |
| Joe | X | X | X | X | X | Jennifer | Jessica | X | Eliminated Week 8 | | | | |
| Jessica | X | X | Patrick | X | Courtney | Jennifer | X | Eliminated Week 7 | | | | | |
| Jennifer | X | X | X | X | X | Ramon | Eliminated Week 6 | | | | | | |
| Courtney | X | X | Patrick | X | Vinny | Eliminated Week 5 | | | | | | | |
| Mike | Debbie | ? | X | Becky | Eliminated Week 4 | | | | | | | | |
| Patrick | X | X | Courtney | Eliminated Week 3 | | | | | | | | | |
| Johnny | Bonnie | Bonnie | Eliminated Week 2 | | | | | | | | | | |
| Debbie | Bonnie | Eliminated Week 1 | | | | | | | | | | | |

Immunity
? Immunity, vote not revealed
X Immunity, was below yellow line or not in elimination, unable to vote
X Below yellow line or up for elimination, unable to vote
X Below red line, automatically eliminated
X Not in elimination, unable to vote
Eliminated or not in house
Valid vote cast
? Vote not revealed or unknown
$250,000 winner (among the finalists)

== Episode Recap Summaries ==
=== Week 1 ===
First aired on September 20, 2011

The 15 new contestants are dropped off in the middle of the California desert, before meeting with Alison. She organizes them into their teams, based on their ages: 30 and under, 31–49, and 50 and over, and then tells them that there are three trainers this season, with two of them being brand new. The trainers are flown in courtesy of the Marine Corps; the first trainer to come out is veteran Bob Harper, who has switched to the black color instead of his original blue. Out next is the first newcomer, former professional tennis player-turned-certified fitness trainer Anna Kournikova, wearing Bob's old blue color. She previously made a guest appearance on an episode of season 10. Finally, the second newcomer, Dolvett Quince, comes out, wearing the red color, a returning team color that was inactive after season 4, but has now been revived. The teams then receive their first challenge; they must compete for the right to choose their trainer. The objective is to walk a mile as a team, whilst carrying a flagpole. Each team must cross the finish line before they can choose their trainer. The middle team (Antone, Joe, John, Jennifer and Sunny) finishes first, chooses Bob, and becomes the black team. The younger team (Patrick, Vinny, Jessica, Ramon and Courtney) finishes second, and the encouragement they received from Dolvett in the final stretch inspired them to choose him and become the red team. The older team (Bonnie, Johnny, Mike, Debbie and Becky), slowed by Bonnie's knee injury, finishes last, and ends up becoming the blue team, with Anna as their trainer. However, as the blue team continues to struggle, Anna and the other trainers, along with the rest of the contestants, run out to meet them and they all cross the line again together. After they finish, Alison tells them about a major twist in the competition: before the finale, there will be a marathon. Every contestant, whether they have been eliminated or not, will take part. The winner of the marathon will automatically become a finalist.

The next day, the contestants meet their trainers at the front door of the gym to begin their first workout, and all teams are training at the same time. Dolvett quickly shows his fierceness and does not hesitate to shout at his team. He focuses on Patrick in particular, and his need to restore his confidence. Anna has a calmer, but still firm, approach, appropriate for her team and their struggle to perform at the same intensity as the younger teams, but she still occasionally screams at her team. She particularly notices Debbie and Johnny's lack of motivation and habits of frequently making excuses and asking for breaks, all of which Anna refuses, and at one point, Johnny decides to leave, but later decides to get back into the gym to finish the workout. Bob makes Antone his "pet project," a former NFL offensive tackle. Antone clearly struggles with what he has become in comparison to his previous athleticism, and breaks down, crying on the floor, just 10 minutes into the workout.

Later on, in the middle of the night, Becky receives a phone call at 3:15 am, notifying her that her father had died of heart failure. Upon hearing the news, she does something "completely out of character;" she goes to the gym by herself and works out on her own to prevent her mind from racing. The next morning, she left the ranch for a few days to be with her family, and Anna and the others have a discussion regarding their health and mortality; it clearly strikes a chord with the other contestants and the state of their own health statuses.

A few days later, Becky returns from her father's funeral, and the last chance workouts begin. Becky's determination to prevent herself from going down the same path as her father was so strong that it caused Anna to get emotional. She tells Becky that she is very proud of her. Antone has also made significant progress from the first workout, but Dolvett decides at one point to kick Patrick out of the gym because of his self-doubt. They then have a discussion, and Patrick decides to get back into the gym to continue the workout.

At the weigh-in, Alison asks Anna and Dolvett how they feel about it. Anna compares this experience to "playing at Arthur Ashe stadium in front of 20,000 people." Dolvett states that "very seldom does [he] ever get nervous, and that right now, [he] is nervous." Bob then states that the only number that matters is the number on the scale, as he has seen contestants young and old alike lose big numbers. The weigh-in then proceeds, and the contestants are weighed-in from oldest to youngest. The oldest contestant, Johnny, loses 17 pounds. Becky and Mike also lose double figures (−10 and −12); however, Bonnie only loses 4 pounds, which is clearly upsetting to everyone, and Debbie loses only 6 pounds. Up next, The black team performs very well, with great numbers from all members, particularly Antone (−32), John (−37), & Joe (−22). The red team also has all its members in double figures: Vinny loses 21 pounds, Patrick loses 20 pounds, and Ramon loses 17 pounds. Thus, the blue team loses the weigh-in, and between them they decide that, despite Bonnie's lower number, she would be better off staying to find the best way for her to lose weight. Debbie explains that she has a support system at home, and would be able to cope if she left. The team supports this, and sends Debbie home.

In the contestant catch-up segment, Debbie has lost 24 pounds, and is much more active, frequently exercising with her daughter, including taking part in her son's dance classes.

=== Week 2 ===
First aired on September 27, 2011

Week 2 begins with Alison introducing them to their first temptation, and the stakes involved. Each team will only have two hours a day to use the gym, and will have the same time slot throughout the week; the three slots are early morning (5–7 am), early afternoon (12 noon-2 pm), and late night (9–11 pm). The temptation involves eating mini-doughnuts (35 calories each) in three minutes, with the winning team choosing the slots for themselves and the other teams. Only two members actually took part: Mike ate 11 doughnuts (385 calories), and John ate 37 (1,295 calories). The black team won the challenge and chose the 5–7 am slot for themselves, and then gave the blue team the 12 noon-2 pm slot and the red team the 9–11 pm slot. This decision apparently caused some conflict, as the red team seemed to think John showed a lack of respect towards them.

On day 1 of the new schedule, Bob enters the dorm with a megaphone and a wake-up song at 4:19 am. The black team struggles with the early morning wake-up call, but Bob is clearly more enthusiastic about having the morning slot, and pushes the black team to their limits, focusing on John for his participation in the temptation. Antone falls off the spin machine from pushing himself so hard, and struggles with his lack of fitness in comparison to his previous days as an athlete. There is also conflict between John and Sunny; John has insulted Sunny to Antone, and tried to make deals with other team members to keep himself in the ranch. There is some resolution; Bob makes the point that cracks in the team dynamic will open themselves up to being defeated by the other teams.

At the 12 noon-2 pm time slot, Anna tailors Bonnie's workout to help with her knee injury, but Johnny is struggling and gives up very quickly in all of his exercises. This irritates Bonnie in particular, as he has no injuries, and is not making the most of his opportunities to exercise. Later, at 8 pm, Dolvett sits down with the red team before their workout, and looks in detail at their calorie intakes and diets: he uses this to ensure that they are all in good shape for their workout. During the workout, Jessica talks to Dolvett about struggling with her past, and how her previous partner encouraged her to gain weight to combat his jealously.

Dr. Huizenga is on the ranch to deliver health test results to the contestants, with the trainers there to support them at his request. Jennifer is revealed to have 155 pounds of excess fat, and has a 32% chance of getting diabetes within the next five years. In Bonnie's case, after having her stomach stapled, she lost over 100 pounds, but the majority of that weight was muscle rather than fat, and as a result, she is in worse shape than before her surgery. She is also extremely likely to need another artificial knee, and Dr. H allows her to speak to her daughter and grandson to help motivate her. Ramon is revealed to be the sickest person in relation to his age (with an internal age of 50, which, ironically enough, was his football number, and 23 years older than his actual age of 27), despite declaring that he had nothing wrong with him, with high blood pressure, elevated bad cholesterol, very low good cholesterol, and diabetes, all of which he was unaware of, because he refused to go to his doctor, out of fear of the facts.

For the challenge, the teams must navigate a ball through a maze floating on water using only their body weight. The fastest time wins a 2-pound advantage, second place gets a 1-pound advantage, and third place gets no advantage. The black team beats the red team by just three seconds, 7:42 to 7:45, and the blue team finished last, with a time of 14:45.

At the last chance workout, the trainers are all concerned by the time restrictions, and their ability to do as much in the two hours that they have. Jennifer has her workout tailored to combat her knee injury, which is severe enough to need an MRI. Johnny is putting in more effort in this workout, which is clearly noticed by Anna.

At the weigh-in, the trainers remark about how the second week has historically always been the hardest week in the competition. The red team goes first; Ramon loses 9 pounds, Courtney loses 7 pounds, and Vinny loses 5 pounds to put him at exactly 400 pounds. The black team goes next, with John losing 15 pounds to get him under 400, Antone losing 10 pounds, and Jennifer losing 6 pounds, despite her injury. Finally, the blue team weighs in; Mike is their biggest loser with a loss of 7 pounds; Becky loses 5 pounds, and Bonnie loses 3 pounds. As Johnny gets on the scale to weigh in, Anna tells her team that she cannot watch because she is very nervous about him this week, and her fears are warranted; Johnny gains 2 pounds, and everyone is shocked at the outcome. As a result, the blue team loses the weigh-in again, and decide to send Johnny home due to his lack of motivation throughout the week.

In the contestant catch-up segment, Johnny has lost 59 pounds, and is enjoying the chance to play with his grandchildren.

=== Week 3 ===
First aired on October 4th, 2011

This week was NFL week. The player from any team who has the highest percentage of weight loss would go to the Super Bowl. And the winner is Mike who had beaten Joe with an outstanding 5.86%. Red Team loses weigh in. The Red Team eliminates Patrick over Courtney after telling his team to vote for him. At Home, Patrick weighs 296 lbs. and is training to be a better police officer.

=== Week 4 ===
First aired on October 11th, 2011

Week 4 starts with the aftermath of the Red Team meeting with Dolvett having voted out Patrick. With Ramon in tears saying :'I feel so bad I can't even describe it, that he betrayed one of his best friends. Dolvett gives the Red Team a pep talk about how their weight loss was their best and they should be proud of it. Morning comes and both Red and Blue are shown to be working out while the Black Team get introduced to Hannah from Season 11, in amazing shape. She explains how miserable she was when she came to the ranch and describes how happy she is now that she's 'unzipped the fat suit'. The Black Team then get lead to the kitchen. Flash to the Red Team, Dolvett brings out Adam from Season 10 who they are now going to workout with. He talks about his own experience, especially about how he lost his mother to diabetes. The workout for today is the Red Team holding these two sandbags (50 lbs) and working as a team to walk 5 miles. They are allowed to pass it off to another team member if needed. However, if they pass it off too often then they would risk the last person not being able to cope. Ramon walks for a mile and shows no sign of being tired. He passes the second mile mark. Vinny fell back during the workout with Dolvett by his side encouraging him. 3rd mile mark and Ramon is still going strong despite the hurt as he is determined to prove he is a leader. Mile 4 and 5 flash by and Ramon has carried it the whole way and feeling great about it. After the workout, Dolvett talks to Courtney about her lack of confidence and how close to going home she was last night. Dolvett reminds Courtney that she is better than she is and should be proud of herself. Back at the house we see Black Team with Hannah, where Hannah is making Virginia Stuffed Peppers. Bob is amazed at how much Hannah has come since last season. On a beach somewhere, the three remaining members of the blue team and Anna are joined by Marci from Season 11. Marci tells them to think about their powerful why. They do several different workout moves with Anna saying she loves finding new moves to do with older people. Bonnie struggles with her knee and can't run with Anna believing she is mentally scared but physically capable. At the "all-weather" challenge, the black team continue their streak, winning video chats and letters from home, whilst both the red and blue teams receive their letters for completing the course. At the weigh-in, it was the black team who continued their four-week streak, winning another weigh-in with −2.12%. The red team came in second with −2.05% and the blue team were forced to visit another elimination with just −1.93%. As she was the biggest loser on her team, Bonnie had the only vote, and chose to send Mike home. At home, Mike now weighs 239 lbs.

=== Week 5 ===
First aired on October 18th, 2011

Sunny won the first challenge and went home with Bob for the time being. At the challenge, all three teams have to carry two cups of soda and then putting them in glass cylinders. In the end, the red team won the challenge and gets two weeks worth in the Biggest Loser resort. The red team weighs in first. They lost 29 lbs. as a team with Vinny losing 10 lbs., Courtney and Jessica losing 6 lbs., and Ramon losing 7 lbs. The blue team weighs in next and for Becky and Bonnie to be safe, they need to lose more than 11 lbs. And the 2 ladies both hit that goal with Bonnie losing 4 lbs. and Becky losing 8 lbs. The black team weighs in last with Sunny being the only person weighing in for the black team. The rest of the black team perform well with John losing 12 lbs., Antone losing 4 lbs., Joe losing 7 lbs., and Jennifer losing 8 lbs. Now it is time for Sunny to weigh-in and in order for the black team to be safe, she needs to lose more than 6 lbs. She hit that goal with a shocking 14 lbs. The red team loses the weigh in and Courtney is sent home. Since starting the Biggest Loser, Courtney weighs 205 lbs. and wants to give her prize to her sister.

=== Week 6 ===
First aired on October 25th, 2011

Ramon and Jessica start a relationship. This was also "All for One" week. If the contestants could lose 100 pounds, none of them would be eliminated. At the challenge, the players got a 10-pound advantage. At the weigh-in, the black team weighs in first and Alison tells John that he is 9 lbs. away from tying the record from Moses in Season 11 losing 100 lbs. in 6 weeks. John has tied the record with losing 10 lbs. Meanwhile, the other players put up with low numbers with Antone and Joe losing 8 lbs., Jennifer loses 4 lbs. and Sunny gains 5 lbs. The blue team weighs in next and both Bonnie and Becky have lost 1 lb. each. Finally, the red weighs in next. Vinny had lost 5 lbs., Jessica had lost 4 lbs., and Ramon has lost 2 lbs., which reasons Anna thinking that because Ramon and Jessica haven't spent all the time in the gym, they both have lost fewer numbers. With the players losing 38 lbs., the players fell short. John is the biggest loser of the week and has immunity for tonight's elimination. Most players have voted for Jennifer over Ramon, therefore Jennifer is eliminated due to her knee injury. Back at home, Jennifer weighs 228 lbs.

=== Week 7 ===
First aired on November 1st, 2011

The teams are re-split by a calorie calculation challenge. The group is set initially split into 3 groups again, 3 youngest, 3 middle, 3 oldest for the challenge and then each group is split among the 3 trainers. Among the young group, Jessica wins and picks Dolvett, Ramon is stuck with Anna and after the previous weigh-ins confrontation he is not happy about it. In the middle group Antone wins and chooses Bob, Sunny picks Anna and that leaves John with Dolvett. Among the "Senior" group Becky wins and picks Bob, Joe picks Anna and Bonnie switches to Dolvett, which brings her to tears of happiness. Ramon confronts Anna for calling him & Jessica out at the weigh-in, no one is happy about being with Anna. At the end of the episode, the new red team loses the weigh-in and Jessica is sent home. Jessica now weighs 185 lbs. and can't wait to start a relationship with Ramon.

=== Week 8 ===
First aired on November 8th, 2011

The teams compete in a cooking challenge (oddly enough with their trainers). Judges are Olivia (season 11 winner) and Devin Alexander (author of all the Biggest Loser cookbooks). Winner receives a 1 lb advantage at the weigh-in, their recipe will be included in the new Biggest Loser Quick and Easy recipe book, and the team gets one-on-one time with Olivia to talk about life after the Biggest Loser and maintaining their weight-loss. Bob's black team wins. When they meet with Olivia, she also delivers pictures/letters from home. We're treated to sappy music and excessive tears. The 'twist' this week is that the trainers will choose one contestant to represent each team in the weigh-in. Dolvett (red team) chooses John. Bonnie (whose weight doesn't count this week) weighs in with a shocking 8 lb (3.62%) weight loss. John loses a semi-impressive 10 lb (3.04%) and hopes it's good enough. If it isn't, John will automatically go home, as Bonnie has the highest percentage of the two. Bob (black team) chooses Becky. Antone loses 5 lb, Vinnie loses 10 lb, and Becky (who has the 1 lb advantage from the challenge) loses 6 lb. And the black team is officially safe (and would've been even without the 1 lb advantage) with 3.65%. Anna (blue team) chooses Joe. Sunny loses only 2 lb and Ramon loses 6 lb. Joe needs to lose 8 lb to be safe, but only loses 2, and the blue team loses the weigh-in and eliminates Joe. At home, Joe weighed 235 pounds and since he missed out on riding on roller coasters for 4 years and so, he took his daughter to the amusement park 4 times.

=== Week 9 ===
First aired on November 15th, 2011

Contestants begin to compete as individuals and compete in a pentathlon. The winner gets immunity, and whoever comes in last place gets a one-pound penalty. In the pentathlon, Antone got first place with a score of 26. Sunny got second place with a score of 25, then Becky at third with a score of 22, then Vinny at fourth scoring 18 points. John and Ramon were tied for fifth place with 17 points apiece. Bonnie got last place with a score of 13, thus getting a one-pound penalty. Beneath the yellow line were Becky and Bonnie. They are the only remaining members of the original Blue Team. The ending was fabulous as Bonnie generously gives up her spot on the ranch to Becky. On the catch up, Bonnie now weighs 186 pounds and is much more active.

=== Week 10 ===
First aired on November 22, 2011 Thanksgiving week began with a temptation. There are 100 thanksgiving dinner dishes in front of the contestants and each of them have a number underneath them. Whoever draw the three lowest numbers get prizes. In the end, Vinny got a 3 lb advantage, Becky got a $25k Cybex home gym, and Antone got $500 for every lb lost.

At the challenge, which is to climb a mile on a Jacob's Ladder, John won a 1 lb advantage and gave a 1 lb disadvantage to Sunny Sinclair. Sunny won a meal plan and gave another meal plan to Bonnie, an eliminated contestant. Ramon won $2500 and gave Vinny $2500. At the weigh in Sunny fell under the yellow line by only 1/100 of a percent. Ramon also fell under the yellow line.

At the elimination, John and Vinny vote for Sunny and Becky and Antone vote for Ramon. Because Ramon had the lowest percentage of weight loss, he is sent packing. Ramon returns home weighing in at 245 lbs. and hopes to get a spot in the final three at the marathon.

=== Week 11 ===
First aired on November 29th, 2011

It's make-over week, and before the contestants are pampered, petted, and spoiled. John wins a 1 lb advantage from the challenge. After massages, they each get a makeover from the Ken Paves salon and see Iris, a Cirque du Soleil show, with a loved one. At the weigh-in, Antone and Sunny fall below the yellow line, with Sunny losing only 1 pound. At the elimination, Becky votes, crying, for Sunny. John votes for Sunny. Vinny's vote is unknown.

Sunny is eliminated. At home, she's lost a total of 96 lbs and wants to lose 100 lbs by the finale.

=== Week 12 ===
First aired on December 6th, 2011 Aired at 9/8c

The contestants run a marathon and Ramon wins and is automatically in the final 3. After the weigh-in, Becky and Vinny are eliminated, leaving Antone and John to face Ramon for the grand prize of $250,000. The last weigh-in will happen at the live finale on December 13, 2011. Vinny proposes to his girlfriend.

Marathon results:
1. 5:05:41 M-27 Ramon, won $25,000
2. 5:09:01 F-25 Courtney, won $10,000
3. 5:15:38 M-41 John, won $7,500
4. 5:17:25 F-26 Jessica, won $5,000
5. 6:24:29 M-26 Patrick, won $2,500
6. 6:45:29 F-42 Sunny
7. Unknown F-40 Jennifer
8. 7:15:28 F-51 Becky
8. 7:15:28 M-44 Antone
10. 8:17:06 M-62 Mike ("Coach")
11. 10:39:31 M-66 Johnny
12. 10:41:25 F-60 Debbie
Joe completed 21 miles. Vinny completed 20 miles. Bonnie did not compete.

=== Week 13 (Finale) ===
First aired on December 13th, 2011 Aired at 9/8c

Concerning the $250,000 prize (John Rhode, Antone Davis, and Ramon Medeiros)

During the twelve weeks at the ranch, John lost a whopping 40%, compared to Antone's 34% and Ramon's 33%. So John had a big lead going into the finale. Between the last week on the ranch and the finale, Antone lost 16.48%, Ramon lost 15.90%, and John lost 15.73%. Although Antone and Ramon made up some ground, John's lead from the ranch was too much for them to overcome. Thus, John won the $250,000 prize. The ending percent loss was: John (49.44%), Antone (45.19%), and Ramon (43.38%).

Concerning the $100,000 "at home" prize

Often, the winner of this prize goes to contestants that were at the ranch the maximum amount of time or near that. However, in this season, a contestant won the "at home" with only having been at the ranch for six weeks: Jennifer Rumple. Despite having a knee injury, Jennifer lost an impressive 60 pounds during those six weeks at the ranch. Indeed, her big numbers probably played as much of a factor in being voted off as her knee. Regardless of being voted off, Jennifer apparently was able to overcome her injury and went on to amazingly lose another 85 pounds. Her final loss percentage was 43.94%.
