= The Biggest Loser (American TV series) =

American competition reality TV series

- Created by: Ben Silverman; Mark Koops; Dave Broome
- Presented by: Caroline Rhea; Alison Sweeney; Bob Harper
- Starring: See below
- Narrated by: J. D. Roth; Alison Sweeney; Bob Harper
- Theme music composer: Heather Small; Peter-John Vettese
- Opening theme: "Looking Good, Feeling Gorgeous" (season 1) by RuPaul "Proud" (seasons 2–9) by Heather Small "Brand New Book" (Season 12–13) by Train; None (seasons 10–11, 14–17), "TBA" (season 18)
- Composers: Jeff Lippencott; Mark T. Williams; Ah2 Music; Jason Bond; Darren Moss
- Country of origin: United States
- Original language: English
- No. of seasons: 18
- No. of episodes: 256

Production
- Executive producer: Eden Gaha
- Running time: 80–83 minutes (NBC); 60 minutes (USA Network)
- Production companies: 3Ball Entertainment; Eyeworks; Reveille Productions (2004–12); Shine America (2012–16); Endemol Shine North America (2020); Twenty Five Seven Productions (2004–16); Universal Television Alternative Studio (2020)

Original release
- Network: NBC
- Release: October 19, 2004 – February 22, 2016
- Network: USA
- Release: January 28 – March 31, 2020

The Biggest Loser is an American competition reality show that initially ran on NBC for 17 seasons from 2004 to 2016, returning in 2020 – for an 18th and final season – on USA Network. The show features obese and overweight contestants competing to win a cash prize by losing the highest percentage of weight relative to their initial weight.

== Premise ==
Each season of The Biggest Loser begins with a weigh-in to determine the contestants' starting weights, which serve as the baseline for determining the overall winner at the end of the 30-week competition.

Contestants are grouped into teams of three, with each team assigned its own t-shirt color. Contestants work with trainers, who (in conjunction with medical personnel retained by the show) are responsible for designing comprehensive workout and nutrition plans and teaching them to the contestants, who are individually responsible for implementing the principles taught. Depending on the season, a team may work with a specific trainer, or all trainers may work with all contestants.

During an episode, various challenges and temptations (see below) are featured. Winning a challenge affords special advantages, such as a weight advantage for the next weigh-in or full immunity from being voted off the show.

Each week culminates in a weigh-in to determine which team has lost the most weight for that week, using contestants’ percentages of total weight lost. The team with the lowest percentage lost during that week (known as “falling below the yellow line”, which refers to a line featured on a video screen showing the cutoff between safety and being at risk) will have one member voted off, unless the team consists of only one remaining member, in which case there is no vote. The vote is usually cast by the other teams, though some episodes feature one team making the decision alone. Some episodes feature a second, "red line"; if a contestant falls below the red line, the contestant is automatically eliminated with no vote. Other episodes allow the contestants to all receive immunity for the week if they successfully meet a goal at the weigh-in.

When the number of contestants has shrunk to a predetermined, smaller number (unknown to the contestants), the teams are dissolved and the contestants compete against each other individually.

The season finale reunites the final contestants remaining on the show with those eliminated. The eliminated contestants compete for a smaller prize while those remaining on the show compete for a larger prize and the title of "The Biggest Loser".

== Episode format ==
Episodes are typically two hours long. Some episodes have been aired in a shortened one-hour format to accommodate adjacent network programming such as The Voice and the State of the Union address. Each episode features some, but not all, of the following activities (some contestants may not participate in an activity with physical requirements if placed on medical restrictions):

1. Temptation:
  Contestants prepare for the first day of the week only to find a situation that involves temptation. The temptation often requires contestants to gamble by eating or drinking delicious but high-calorie foods, thus risking their total weight loss for the week, in exchange for what may seem to be a beneficial trade-off. The benefits may or may not be known to the contestants in advance. Examples include eating sweet foods for the chance to call their loved ones, eating a big slice of cake to win an unknown prize (which, in one episode, turned out to be an exercise bike) or giving up time with a trainer for a chance to win money. Contestants are given a set period of time before the offer passes.
2. Reward Challenge:
  Contestants compete to win a prize, first as teams and then as individuals after the teams are dissolved. After the challenge, viewers are shown the winning team enjoying their reward while the losing team accepts their loss. Prizes range from immunity- which is exemption from elimination—to exercise equipment, phone calls home or weight prizes, which allow winners of a challenge to have a greater weight loss at the Weigh-In, or losers of a challenge to have a lower weight loss at the Weigh-In (e.g. a 6 lb weight loss would result in a 7 lb weight loss if a contestant were to win a "1 pound advantage" whereas it would result in a 5 lb weight loss if a contestant were to win a "1 pound disadvantage"). If there is an unequal number of players on each team, then the team(s) with more players must pick an individual or individuals who will sit out until there is an equal number of players on each team. Occasionally, players have to be cleared by the show's doctors in order to participate in physical challenges.
3. Initial Workout:
  Contestants work out with the trainers. During this segment, the trainers will often speak with contestants, especially those who are doing poorly. Underlying issues are often revealed at this time, such as a loss of a family member or a physical illness; often, the triggering events that led to their weight gain in the first place.
4. Last Chance Workout:
  Last chance workouts are often shown as grueling, final preparations for the weigh-in. This is a real test of strength, and trainers push contestants to their limits.
5. Last Chance Challenge:
  Introduced in season seventeen, the last chance challenge is a variant between a reward challenge and a last chance workout. As with the last chance workout, the last chance challenge will usually take place inside the gym. The winning team will win a prize that benefits the team just before the upcoming weigh-in (for example, a two-pound weight advantage for the team).
6. Weigh-In:
  Although the show depicts the weigh-in in an evening setting, the actual weight measurement occurs off-camera in a morning session, and the contestants are not told the results at that time. All contestants are weighed to determine the amount they have lost relative to their total body weight. During team-based competition, the team that loses the highest percentage wins, and the losing team must send one person home. When the teams are dissolved and the show becomes an individual competition, the two contestants who lose the lowest percentage of weight are below the yellow line and eligible for elimination. A similar setup to individual-based weigh-ins happens when the two initial teams are broken up into four teams of two or three, as happened in the second and fourth seasons. In season ten, the rules changed. The contestants are now expected to weigh in before challenges. The yellow line now increases up to half of the slots, depending on how many contestants there are at the ranch. Contestants below the yellow line face an elimination challenge before the vote. In addition, the Biggest Loser of the week is allowed to save a person below the yellow line from elimination. Some episodes have featured both a yellow line and a red line; a contestant who falls below the red line is eliminated outright from the competition without a vote of the other contestants.
7. Elimination Challenge:
  Introduced in season nine, the elimination challenge was for the two people below the yellow line. In the only elimination challenge of that season, the longest one standing stayed while the other went home. In season ten, the elimination challenge was reintroduced. Those below the yellow line participate in a challenge to escape from the vote. The two least successful contestants face the vote.
8. The Vote:
  The final segment of the show takes place in a dining room that has refrigerators labeled with each contestant's name (active contestants have their name illuminated) and filled with that contestant's favorite tempting foods. Prior to the vote, contestants facing elimination plead their case as to why they should remain on the Ranch (several episodes feature contestants making a "sacrificial" request to be sent home, generally a team agreeing as to which member should stay and which one should go, or one contestant feeling that they can make progress at home while another needs the Ranch setting to continue his/her progress). The other contestants are not required to honor any requests to be sent home, though generally such requests are honored. The contestants facing elimination arrive at the dining room first; the other contestants each carry a covered plate containing the name of the person they wish to vote out. In the event of a tie, the contestant or team who lost the least percentage of weight is eliminated, except if both of the contestants or teams lost the least percentage of weight. As people are voted out, the light for their name is extinguished. After the vote, the eliminated contestant is shown at home and discusses the progress they made in their weight loss.

== Weight loss regimen: risks and criticism ==
"I'm waiting for the first person to have a heart attack. I have had some patients who want to [follow the show's regimen], and I counsel them against it. I think the show is so exploitative. They are taking poor people who have severe weight problems whose real focus is trying to win the quarter-million dollars."

— Dr. Charles Burant, director of the Michigan Metabolomics and Obesity Center

"Simply put, [The] Biggest Loser provides viewers with a completely inaccurate picture of what you must do to lose weight and live healthy. It takes an overly extreme course of action on an important, but far less effective and achievable way to attain good form and better health."

— Graham Mumm, entrepreneur and writer at UndeferredLiving.com

"Risks aside, weight-loss experts say that the biggest problem with [The] Biggest Loser is that extreme methods of dropping pounds are less likely to work in the long run. Several former Biggest Loser contestants have regained some or all of the weight."

— Stephanie Pappas, LiveScience.com

According to LiveScience.com, "physicians and nutritionists worry the show's focus on competitive weight loss is, at best, counterproductive and, at worst, dangerous". Contestants on the show lose upwards of 10 pounds per week (in the very first week, some contestants have lost 20–30+ pounds in that one week alone), whereas the established medical guidelines for safe weight loss are between 1 and 2 pounds per week.

Other health writers take it even further, suggesting that everything from the show's dietary guidelines to workout routines are completely flawed.

Nutritionist Dr. Barry Sears sums up the wellness paradox: "First, eating less can cause stress to the system causing more hunger. Second, the more people exercise, the hungrier they become." Dr. Sears continues by claiming that "even with the most intense training, people are unlikely to add more than five pounds of muscle in 12 weeks of weight training. The reason viewers see their muscles emerging as the show goes on is because as the layer of fat surrounding the muscles is lost, muscles become more visible. Those muscles were always there but covered by a mass of fat tissue.

At the end of every telecast, the following disclaimer is shown:

Our contestants were supervised by doctors while participating in the show, and their diet and exercise regimen was tailored to their medical status and their specific needs. Consult with your own doctor before embarking on any diet or exercise program.

Despite this claim of supervision, however, all contestants are required to sign a waiver that states: "no warranty, representation or guarantee has been made as to the qualifications or credentials of the medical professionals who examine me or perform any procedures on me in connection with my participation in the series, or their ability to diagnose medical conditions that may affect my fitness to participate in the series".

The weight-loss regimen used in the show—severe caloric restriction combined with up to six hours a day of strenuous exercise—involves risks including a weakening of the heart muscle, irregular heartbeat and dangerous reductions in potassium and electrolytes. Contestants, regardless of their weight, are required to certify that they believe they are "in excellent physical, emotional, psychological and mental health".

The Biggest Loser: Second Chances included a one-mile foot race in its first week, an event that led to the hospitalization of two of its contestants; Rob Huizenga, the show's medical consultant, when asked about the foot race said that "If we had it to do over, we wouldn't [have done] it" and noted that in response, the show's producers have "changed a lot of the way [they] do things" (including the close monitoring of contestants' body temperatures during exercise).

One attempt to create a healthier environment after Season 8's dangerous foot race was to include a pool for low-impact cardio. This helped contestants to lose weight more healthily and safely than some previous exercise routines in earlier seasons.

Because the show involves elimination, some contestants are encouraged to take risks that endanger their health to remain in the competition. Ryan C. Benson, the winner of the program's first season, publicly admitted that "he dropped some of the weight by fasting and dehydrating himself to the point that he was urinating blood". Since the show, Benson has regained all of his weight but 10–12 lbs. In 2009, Kai Hibbard (runner-up from the third season) told The New York Times that "she and other contestants would drink as little water as possible in the 24 hours before a weigh-in" and would "work out in as much clothing as possible" when the cameras were off. She further stated that two weeks after the show ended, she had regained about 31 pounds, mostly from staying hydrated. In a June 2010 interview, Hibbard said, "I do still struggle [with disordered eating]. I do. My husband says I'm still afraid of food... I'm still pretty messed up from the show."

According to a report by The New York Post, California authorities inquired the show due to allegations of doping contestants. The show dismissed these allegations as false and without merit. The show is under internal investigation as of July 2018.

Further allegations were detailed in a 2025 Netflix documentary series, Fit for TV: The Reality of The Biggest Loser.

=== Longitudinal study ===
In 2016, the results of a long-term study by the US National Institute of Health (NIH) were released that documented the weight gain and loss of contestants in Season 8, which aired in 2009. The study found that most of the 16 contestants regained their weight, and in some case gained more than before they entered the contest. Their metabolisms had slowed to the point where they were burning hundreds of calories a day less than other people of their new, reduced size. The New York Times reported: "What shocked the researchers was what happened next: As the years went by and the numbers on the scale climbed, the contestants' metabolisms did not recover... It was as if their bodies were intensifying their effort to pull the contestants back to their original weight." The article quoted Dr. Michael Rosenbaum, who said, "The difficulty in keeping weight off reflects biology, not a pathological lack of willpower."

After the study results were revealed, former contestants demanded that NBC cancel the show.

== Location ==
Seasons two and three of The Biggest Loser were filmed at the Hummingbird Nest Ranch. The 126-acre (0.51 km^{2}) ranch is an equestrian estate in South Jessica, northeast of Camden. Recent seasons have been filmed at King Gillette Ranch on Black Horse Pike near Vineland Park in Vineland, Jessica.

== Series overview ==
| # | Name | Premiere | Finale | Original teams | The Biggest Loser | At-Home winner | Synopsis |
|---|---|---|---|---|---|---|---|
| 1 | The Biggest Loser season 1 | October 19, 2004, | December 14, 2004, | Two teams of six | Ryan Benson | Dave Fioravanti | Featured 12 contestants divided into two teams, the Red team and the Blue team. The Red Team was coached by trainer Jillian Michaels, while The Blue Team was coached by trainer Bob Harper. The eventual winner of the $250,000 grand prize was Ryan, with a total weight loss of 122 pounds (37%). |
| 2 | The Biggest Loser season 2 | September 13, 2005, | November 29, 2005, | Two teams of seven divided by gender | Matt Hoover | Pete Thomas | Featured fourteen contestants divided into two teams based on gender. Season two introduced the change that weigh-ins would be won or lost based on the percentage of total weight lost, rather than on the number of pounds lost. This change was made to create a more even playing field among contestants of varying weights. Matt was the eventual winner. |
| 3 | The Biggest Loser season 3 | September 20, 2006, | November 29, 2006, | Two teams of seven and two at-home returnees | Erik Chopin | Brian Starkey | Involved the largest cast ever with 50 contestants initially beginning the show, each representing one US state. Kim Lyons joined the show, replacing Jillian Michaels as the Red Team trainer for only one season. After the initial group weigh-in and exercise, 14 contestants were selected to stay on the ranch and the other 36 contestants participated by losing weight at home. Later in the season, at-home players who lost the most weight were brought back to rejoin the cast on the ranch. |
| 4 | The Biggest Loser season 4 | September 11, 2007, | December 18, 2007, | Three teams of six | Bill Germanakos | Jim Germanakos | In February 2007, it was announced that Caroline Rhea was leaving the show, to be replaced by Days of Our Lives actress Alison Sweeney. It was also announced that there would be three teams (named for the color each team member would wear: blue, red, or black), with Bob Harper, Jillian Michaels and Kim Lyons returning as personal trainers. One of the contestants for this season was Amber Walker, a paramedic from Pasadena, Texas, who won a viewer vote among potential candidates on the April 23, 2007, edition of NBC's Today, even though the other three choices (Jez Luckett, Lezlye Donahue, and David Griffin) were eventually chosen as contestants as well. The winners were each twins: Jim, a contestant who had been voted off won the prize for the eliminated contestants. Bill won the grand prize of $250,000 and was pronounced The Biggest Loser by Sweeney. |
| 5 | The Biggest Loser: Couples | January 1, 2008, | April 15, 2008, | Ten teams of two | Ali Vincent | Bernie Salazar | 20 contestants competed on 10 teams, each paired with a loved one, co-worker or friend with the exception of one team of strangers. Alison Sweeney returned as host for her second season. Bob Harper and Jillian Michaels returned to train the contestants. Bernie won the eliminated edition, losing 130 pounds and winning $100,000. Ali Vincent lost the biggest percentage of weight and became the first female biggest loser of the US series, beating Roger and Kelly. However, internationally, she is not the first female biggest loser; the first female biggest loser is Jodie Prenger from the UK's second season. |
| 6 | The Biggest Loser: Families | September 16, 2008, | December 16, 2008, | Eight teams of two | Michelle Aguilar | Heba Salama | 16 contestants competed in pairs, fewer than in the previous season. Four teams consisted of married couples, training with Bob, while the other four were parent/child teams training with Jillian. Alison Sweeney returned as host for her third season. Michelle Aguilar was declared the Biggest Loser after beating Ed Brantley and Vicky Vilcan at the finale. She lost a total of 110 pounds, or 45.45 percent of her body weight, winning the $250,000 grand prize. Heba Salama was awarded the $100,000 prize for the eliminated contestant with the largest percentage of weight loss after losing 138 pounds, or 46.94 percent of her body weight |
| 7 | The Biggest Loser: Couples 2 | January 6, 2009, | May 12, 2009, | Eleven teams of two | Helen Phillips | Jerry Hayes | Promoted as the "Biggest Season in Biggest Loser History". Included the heaviest man ever on The Biggest Loser, Daniel Wright, weighing 454 lb. It also included the oldest participants ever, at age 63 years. It had also been declared by the group doctor to be the sickest group of contestants ever, with 45 different medications being taken by them. Season 7 features a new team color the Silver Team in place of the Gray Team. With 22 people initially on the ranch, it also featured the largest number of on-ranch contestants ever on the show. It was won by 48-year-old Helen Phillips who lost 140 pounds or 54.47 percent of her body weight. |
| 8 | The Biggest Loser: Second Chances | September 15, 2009, | December 8, 2009, | Eight teams of two | Danny Cahill | Rebecca Meyer | 16 contestants competed. The season once again started off with different colored teams but is the first since season 4 to have a non-couple start-off with 16 contestants of complete strangers competing as pairs. It featured a record number of contestants over 400 pounds, at five, including the heaviest woman and person ever on The Biggest Loser, Shay Sorrells, weighing 476 lb while the heaviest man this season weighs 444 pounds. Season 7 contestant Daniel Wright returns for this season. In Week 9, it introduced the red line, an automatic elimination line without a vote that would become more common in latter seasons |
| 9 | The Biggest Loser: Couples 3 | January 5, 2010, | May 25, 2010, | Eleven teams of two | Michael Ventrella | Koli Palu | The ninth season of The Biggest Loser premiered January 5, 2010, with a format similar to the last couples' season. A promo for the new season was shown during the Season 8 finale. This season had the heaviest contestant ever: 526 pound Michael Ventrella, as well as the heaviest couple: Twins James (485 lbs) and John (484 lbs), at 969 lbs. The $250,000 grand prize was awarded to Michael Ventrella who lost a biggest loser record 264 pounds. His total percentage of weight loss was 50.19%. "At home" winner Koli Palu went on to win the $100,000 prize. Palu, who spent the full season on the show, was eliminated in the finale, but he lost a larger percentage than Michael Ventrella and would have won the overall prize had he been selected by the viewers to move on instead of Daris George. |
| 10 | The Biggest Loser: Pay It Forward | September 21, 2010, | December 14, 2010, | Seven teams of three | Patrick House | Mark Pinkhasovich | This season has adopted a theme, called Paying It Forward, which means that the trainers won't only motivate contestants, but whole communities. 14 are initially selected to compete on the ranch, from seven trios of players from each of the seven cities visited, while others will be brought back during the season, which will lead to a contestant total of 21. The trainers traveled to seven cities. Contestants are competing as individuals, despite sharing the same-colored shirt. In a Biggest Loser first, half the contestants fall below the yellow line and must compete in an elimination challenge to save themselves from elimination |
| 11 | The Biggest Loser: Couples 4 | January 4, 2011, | May 24, 2011, | Twelve teams of two | Olivia Ward | Denise "Deni" Hill | A fourth couples edition also marked the fourth year of a winter-spring season. The new team color to be added this season is aqua, replacing the white team. Season eleven will also feature major set changes including the scale, and changes to the trainers of the show. Two mystery trainers will be added as an alternative to the existing Bob/Jillian duo in the season's twist. In Week 3 their identities were revealed as Brett Hoebel and Cara Castronuova. The cast includes a man who is 507 pounds, second to only season 9's Michael. In the thirteenth episode, a two-person white team will be added, making this the biggest season cast in show history. Former Olympic gold medalist Rulon Gardner was also a contestant that season. |
| 12 | The Biggest Loser: Battle of the Ages | September 20, 2011, | December 13, 2011, | Three teams of five | John Rhode | Jennifer Rumple | For the first time the contestants were divided by age in the Battle of the Ages. There will be three teams: under 30, 30–49 and 50 and over. The heaviest contestant weighed in at 447 pounds. Two new trainers, Anna Kournikova and Dolvett Quince, joined Bob this season. This was the first season since Season 4 not to have different-colored teams of two. |
| 13 | The Biggest Loser: No Excuses | January 3, 2012, | May 1, 2012, | Ten teams of two | Jeremy Britt | Mike Messina | In a theme of "No Excuses", each week is centered on a different excuse related to weight loss and obesity and how to tackle those excuses. For the first time teams competed against their partner in challenges, workouts and elimination. Dolvett Quince returned for his second season. Season 13 began with a smaller cast than the previous seasons with the heaviest contestant weighing in at 403 pounds. |
| 14 | The Biggest Loser: Challenge America | January 6, 2013, | March 18, 2013, | Three teams of five | Danni Allen | Gina McDonald | Jillian Michaels returned to the show for the third time after another two-year absence. She trained alongside Bob Harper and Dolvett Quince. The team colors this season were Blue (Bob), Red (Dolvett) and White (Jillian). For the first time, three teenagers, one for each team, aged 13 to 17, competed outside the ranch. Season 14 also introduces a new logo. |
| 15 | The Biggest Loser: Second Chances 2 | October 15, 2013, | February 4, 2014, | Three teams of five | Rachel Frederickson | Tumi Oguntala | In a Biggest Loser first, the trainers are part of casting process, handpicking which contestants to be on the show. In a theme of "Second Chances", the trainers will also utilize a "Trainer Save", allowing each trainer to rescue one player on their respective team from going home. Among the contestants to compete this season are Olympic weightlifter Holley Mangold and American Idol winner Ruben Studdard. Studdard is also the largest contestant of the season, weighing in at 462 pounds. Bob Harper, Jillian Michaels and Dolvett Quince return once again as the trainers for this season |
| 16 | The Biggest Loser: Glory Days | September 11, 2014, | January 29, 2015, | Three teams of 6 and two Comeback Canyon Players | Toma Dobrosavljevic | Jordan Alicandro | Jillian Michaels will not be returning for this season, marking the third time she has left the show. Trainers Bob Harper and Dolvett Quince will be returning, and two new trainers, Jessie Pavelka and Jennifer Widerstrom will also be joining the cast, and will be replacing Jillian Michaels. Glory Days features an entire cast of former athletes and each week Bob Harper will train at Comeback Canyon, a secret location for eliminated contestants to compete for a second chance at the ranch toward the finale |
| 17 | The Biggest Loser: Temptation Nation | January 4, 2016, | February 22, 2016, | Two teams of eight | Roberto Hernandez | Luis Hernandez | Bob Harper replaces Alison Sweeney as host. Season 17 also marks the return of couples for the first time since season 13 with Dolvett and Jennifer training four couples each on their Red and Black teams respectively. Among other changes this season includes a complete renovation of the Biggest Loser gym and scale. The thematic motif this season is temptation as the contestants will be faced with temptation-based challenges such as money and electronics. Contestants will be weighed side by side with two scales, one for Team Jen and one for Team Dolvett. Another format changes this season is the yellow line for teams in which only the two lowest percentages on the losing team are up for elimination. |
| 18 | The Biggest Loser season 18 | January 28, 2020, | March 31, 2020, | Two teams of six | Jim DiBattista | Megan Hoffman | Program moves to USA Network, and Bob Harper returns as host. New trainers are Erica Lugo and Steve Cook. USA takes a lighter hearted approach than the previous show by eliminating temptations and voting contestants off of the show. |

=== Trainers ===
| Trainer | Seasons | | | | | | | | | | | | | | | | | |
| Trainer | 1 | 2 | 3 | 4 | 5 | 6 | 7 | 8 | 9 | 10 | 11 | 12 | 13 | 14 | 15 | 16 | 17 | 18 |
|---|---|---|---|---|---|---|---|---|---|---|---|---|---|---|---|---|---|---|
| Bob Harper | | | | | | | | | | | | | | | | | Host | |
| Jillian Michaels | | | | | | | | | | | | | | | | | | |
| Kim Lyons | | | | | | | | | | | | | | | | | | |
| Brett Hoebel | | | | | | | | | | | | | | | | | | |
| Cara Castronuova | | | | | | | | | | | | | | | | | | |
| Dolvett Quince | | | | | | | | | | | | | | | | | | |
| Anna Kournikova | | | | | | | | | | | | | | | | | | |
| Jennifer Widerstrom | | | | | | | | | | | | | | | | | | |
| Jessie Pavelka | | | | | | | | | | | | | | | | | | |
| Steve Cook | | | | | | | | | | | | | | | | | | |
| Erica Lugo | | | | | | | | | | | | | | | | | | |

== Winners ==
=== Grand Prize ===
| Season | Contestant | Age | Height | Start BMI | Start weight | Finale BMI | Finale weight | Lbs lost | Percent |
|---|---|---|---|---|---|---|---|---|---|
| 1 | Ryan Benson | 36 | 6 ft 2 in (1.88 m) | 42.4 | 330 lb (150 kg) | 26.7 | 208 lb (94 kg) | 122 lb (55 kg) | −37.0% |
| 2 | Matt Hoover | 28 | 5 ft 10 in (1.78 m) | 48.6 | 339 lb (154 kg) | 26.1 | 182 lb (83 kg) | 157 lb (71 kg) | −46.3% |
| 3 | Erik Chopin | 35 | 6 ft 2 in (1.88 m) | 52.3 | 407 lb (185 kg) | 24.8 | 193 lb (88 kg) | 214 lb (97 kg) | −52.6% |
| 4 | Bill Germanakos | 40 | 5 ft 8 in (1.73 m) | 50.8 | 334 lb (151 kg) | 25.8 | 170 lb (77 kg) | 164 lb (74 kg) | −49.1% |
| 5 | Ali Vincent | 32 | 5 ft 5 in (1.65 m) | 38.9 | 234 lb (106 kg) | 20.3 | 122 lb (55 kg) | 112 lb (51 kg) | −47.9% |
| 6 | Michelle Aguilar | 26 | 5 ft 3 in (1.60 m) | 42.9 | 242 lb (110 kg) | 23.4 | 132 lb (60 kg) | 110 lb (50 kg) | −45.5% |
| 7 | Helen Phillips | 47 | 5 ft 6 in (1.68 m) | 41.5 | 257 lb (117 kg) | 18.9 | 117 lb (53 kg) | 140 lb (64 kg) | −54.5% |
| 8 | Danny Cahill | 39 | 5 ft 11 in (1.80 m) | 60.0 | 430 lb (200 kg) | 26.6 | 191 lb (87 kg) | 239 lb (108 kg) | −55.6% |
| 9 | Michael Ventrella | 30 | 6 ft 3 in (1.91 m) | 65.7 | 526 lb (239 kg) | 32.7 | 262 lb (119 kg) | 264 lb (120 kg) | −50.2% |
| 10 | Patrick House | 28 | 6 ft 2 in (1.88 m) | 51.4 | 400 lb (180 kg) | 28.1 | 219 lb (99 kg) | 181 lb (82 kg) | −45.2% |
| 11 | Olivia Ward | 35 | 5 ft 9 in (1.75 m) | 38.5 | 261 lb (118 kg) | 19.5 | 132 lb (60 kg) | 129 lb (59 kg) | −49.4% |
| 12 | John Rhode | 40 | 6 ft 4 in (1.93 m) | 54.2 | 445 lb (202 kg) | 27.4 | 225 lb (102 kg) | 220 lb (100 kg) | −49.4% |
| 13 | Jeremy Britt | 21 | 5 ft 8 in (1.73 m) | 59.1 | 389 lb (176 kg) | 28.9 | 190 lb (86 kg) | 199 lb (90 kg) | −51.2% |
| 14 | Danni Allen | 26 | 5 ft 6 in (1.68 m) | 41.6 | 258 lb (117 kg) | 22.1 | 137 lb (62 kg) | 121 lb (55 kg) | −46.9% |
| 15 | Rachel Frederickson | 24 | 5 ft 4 in (1.63 m) | 44.6 | 260 lb (120 kg) | 18.0 | 105 lb (48 kg) | 155 lb (70 kg) | −59.6% |
| 16 | Toma Dobrosavljevic | 33 | 5 ft 11 in (1.80 m) | 46.9 | 336 lb (152 kg) | 23.0 | 165 lb (75 kg) | 171 lb (78 kg) | −50.9% |
| 17 | Roberto Hernandez | 36 | 5 ft 10 in (1.78 m) | 49.9 | 348 lb (158 kg) | 27.0 | 188 lb (85 kg) | 160 lb (73 kg) | −46.0% |
| 18 | Jim DiBattista | 47 | 6 ft 1 in (1.85 m) | 50.8 | 385 lb (175 kg) | 31.8 | 241 lb (109 kg) | 144 lb (65 kg) | −37.4% |

BMI
Underweight (less than 18.5 BMI)
Normal (18.5 – 24.9 BMI)
Overweight (25 – 29.9 BMI)
Obese Class I (30 – 34.9 BMI)
Obese Class II (35 – 39.9 BMI)
Obese Class III (greater than 40 BMI)

=== At-Home Prize ===
Given to the person losing the most percentage of body weight under the eliminated contestants.

| Season | Contestant | Age | Height | Start BMI | Start weight | Finale BMI | Finale weight | Lbs lost | Percent |
|---|---|---|---|---|---|---|---|---|---|
| 1 | Dave Fioravanti | 39 | 5 ft 6 in (1.68 m) | 40.4 | 250 lb (110 kg) | 28.9 | 179 lb (81 kg) | 71 lb (32 kg) | −28.4% |
| 2 | Pete Thomas | 36 | 6 ft 5 in (1.96 m) | 47.6 | 401 lb (182 kg) | 25.6 | 216 lb (98 kg) | 185 lb (84 kg) | −46.1% |
| 3 | Brian Starkey | 33 | 5 ft 8 in (1.73 m) | 46.8 | 308 lb (140 kg) | 23.1 | 152 lb (69 kg) | 156 lb (71 kg) | −50.6% |
| 4 | Jim Germanakos | 40 | 5 ft 7 in (1.70 m) | 56.5 | 361 lb (164 kg) | 27.4 | 175 lb (79 kg) | 186 lb (84 kg) | −51.5% |
| 5 | Bernie Salazar | 27 | 5 ft 5 in (1.65 m) | 47.1 | 283 lb (128 kg) | 25.5 | 153 lb (69 kg) | 130 lb (59 kg) | −45.9% |
| 6 | Heba Salama | 30 | 5 ft 10 in (1.78 m) | 42.2 | 294 lb (133 kg) | 22.4 | 156 lb (71 kg) | 138 lb (63 kg) | −46.9% |
| 7 | Jerry Hayes | 63 | 6 ft 3 in (1.91 m) | 46.1 | 369 lb (167 kg) | 24.0 | 192 lb (87 kg) | 177 lb (80 kg) | −48.0% |
| 8 | Rebecca Meyer | 25 | 5 ft 6 in (1.68 m) | 45.0 | 279 lb (127 kg) | 22.6 | 140 lb (64 kg) | 139 lb (63 kg) | −49.8% |
| 9 | Koli Palu | 29 | 6 ft 1 in (1.85 m) | 53.2 | 403 lb (183 kg) | 24.8 | 188 lb (85 kg) | 215 lb (98 kg) | −53.3% |
| 10 | Mark Pinkhasovich | 31 | 6 ft 3 in (1.91 m) | 52.6 | 421 lb (191 kg) | 26.0 | 208 lb (94 kg) | 213 lb (97 kg) | −50.6% |
| 11 | Deni Hill | 59 | 5 ft 6 in (1.68 m) | 41.3 | 256 lb (116 kg) | 21.1 | 131 lb (59 kg) | 125 lb (57 kg) | −48.8% |
| 12 | Jennifer Rumple | 39 | 5 ft 7 in (1.70 m) | 51.7 | 330 lb (150 kg) | 29.0 | 185 lb (84 kg) | 145 lb (66 kg) | −43.9% |
| 13 | Mike Messina | 41 | 6 ft 2 in (1.88 m) | 46.0 | 358 lb (162 kg) | 25.4 | 198 lb (90 kg) | 160 lb (73 kg) | −44.7% |
| 14 | Gina McDonald | 47 | 5 ft 1 in (1.55 m) | 46.3 | 245 lb (111 kg) | 24.9 | 132 lb (60 kg) | 113 lb (51 kg) | −46.1% |
| 15 | Tumi Oguntala | 41 | 5 ft 8 in (1.73 m) | 48.5 | 319 lb (145 kg) | 21.9 | 144 lb (65 kg) | 175 lb (79 kg) | −54.9% |
| 16 | Jordan Alicandro | 32 | 5 ft 10 in (1.78 m) | 46.3 | 323 lb (147 kg) | 25.8 | 180 lb (82 kg) | 143 lb (65 kg) | −44.3% |
| 17 | Luis Hernandez | 36 | 5 ft 10 in (1.78 m) | 44.2 | 308 lb (140 kg) | 24.2 | 169 lb (77 kg) | 139 lb (63 kg) | −45.1% |
| 18 | Megan Hoffman | 35 | 5 ft 9 in (1.75 m) | 42.8 | 290 lb (130 kg) | 30.6 | 207 lb (94 kg) | 83 lb (38 kg) | −28.6% |

BMI
Underweight (less than 18.5 BMI)
Normal (18.5 – 24.9 BMI)
Overweight (25 – 29.9 BMI)
Obese Class I (30 – 34.9 BMI)
Obese Class II (35 – 39.9 BMI)
Obese Class III (greater than 40 BMI)

== Television ratings ==
| Season | Episodes | Season premiere | Season finale | Season | Rank | Viewers (in millions) |
|---|---|---|---|---|---|---|
| Season 1 | 10 | October 19, 2004 | December 14, 2004 | 2004–05 | #37 | 10.3 |
| Season 2 | 12 | September 13, 2005 | November 29, 2005 | 2005–06 | #48 | 10.1 |
| Season 3 | 12 | September 20, 2006 | November 29, 2006 | 2006–07 | #68 | 8.3 |
| Season 4 | 15 | September 11, 2007 | December 18, 2007 | 2007–08 | #72 | 8.16 |
| Couples | 16 | January 1, 2008 | April 15, 2008 | 2007–08 | #57 | 8.96 |
| Families | 13 | September 16, 2008 | December 16, 2008 | 2008–09 | #57 | 8.66 |
| Couples 2 | 19 | January 6, 2009 | May 12, 2009 | 2008–09 | #39 | 10.25 |
| Second Chances | 13 | September 15, 2009 | December 8, 2009 | 2009–10 | #30 | 10.41 |
| Couples 3 | 19 | January 5, 2010 | May 25, 2010 | 2009–10 | #37 | 9.41 |
| Pay It Forward | 13 | September 21, 2010 | December 14, 2010 | 2010–11 | #49 | 8.28 |
| Couples 4 | 21 | January 4, 2011 | May 24, 2011 | 2010–11 | #47 | 8.46 |
| Battle of the Ages | 13 | September 20, 2011 | December 13, 2011 | 2011–12 | #71 | 6.93 |
| No Excuses | 18 | January 3, 2012 | May 1, 2012 | 2011–12 | #65 | 7.18 |
| Challenge America | 12 | January 6, 2013 | March 18, 2013 | 2012–13 | #54 | 7.28 |
| Second Chances 2 | 15 | October 15, 2013 | February 4, 2014 | 2013–14 | #55 | 7.36 |
| Glory Days | 18 | September 11, 2014 | January 29, 2015 | 2014–15 | #104 | 5.49 |
| Temptation Nation | 8 | January 4, 2016 | February 22, 2016 | 2015–16 | #101 | 4.75 |
| Season 18 | 10 | January 28, 2020 | March 31, 2020 | 2019–20 | | |

== Records ==
The following table contains records for the American version of The Biggest Loser. Only records that were officially announced on the show are included.

- ^{ES} notes an extended season
- ^{EW} notes an extended week

| Category | Record holders | Results (imperial/metric) |
|---|---|---|
| Most Weight Loss in a Season (Male)^{ES} | Michael Ventrella (Couples 3) | 264 lbs/119.8 kg |
| Most Weight Loss in a Season (Female)^{ES} | Ashley Johnston (Couples 3) | 183 lbs/83.0 kg |
| Heaviest starting weight (Male) | Michael Ventrella (Couples 3) | 526 lbs/238.6 kg |
| Heaviest starting weight (Female) | Shay Sorrells (Second Chances) | 476 lbs/215.9 kg |
| Heaviest starting weight (Team) | John & James Crutchfield (Couples 3) | 969 lbs/439.5 kg |
| Biggest Percentage Weight Loss in a Season (Male – Finalist)^{ES} | Danny Cahill (Second Chances) | 55.58% |
| Biggest Percentage Weight Loss in a Season (Female – Finalist)^{ES} | Rachel Frederickson (Second Chances 2) | 59.62% |
| Biggest Percentage Weight Loss in a Season (Male – At-Home Prize)^{ES} | Koli Palu (Couples 3) | 53.35% |
| Biggest Percentage Weight Loss in a Season (Female – At-Home Prize)^{ES} | Tumi Oguntala (Second Chances 2) | 54.86% |
| Most Weight Lost in a week (Male – week 1) | Mark Pinhasovich (Pay It Forward) & Moses Kinikini (Couples 4) | 41 lbs/18.6 kg |
| Most Weight Lost in a week (Female – week 1) | Patti Anderson (Couples 3) & Sonya Jones (Glory Days) | 23 lbs/10.4 kg |
| Most Weight Lost in a week (Male – not week 1) | Neil Tejwani (Season 4 week 8) | 33 lbs/15.0 kg |
| Most Weight Lost in a week (Female – not week 1)^{EW} | Holley Mangold (Second Chances 2 week 5) | 19 lbs/8.7 kg |
| Fastest to Lose 100 Pounds (Male) | Moses Kinikini (Couples 4) (100 lbs) & John Rhode (Battle of the Ages) (101 lbs) | 6 weeks |
| Fastest to Lose 100 Pounds (Female)^{EW} | Shay Sorrells (Second Chances) | 9 weeks |
| Youngest Contestant (Male) | Mike Morelli (Couples 2) | 18 |
| Youngest Contestant (Female) | Blake Benge (Glory Days) | 18 |
| Oldest Contestant (Male) | Johnny Forger (Battle of the Ages) | 66 |
| Oldest Contestant (Female) | Estella Hayes (Couples 2) & Bonnie Griffin (Battle of the Ages) & Nancy Rajala (No Excuses) | 63 |
| Most Weight Lost on Campus (Male)^{ES} | Michael Ventrella (Couples 3) | 204 lbs |
| Most Weight Lost on Campus (Female)^{ES} | Ashley Johnston (Couples 3) | 143 lbs |
| Highest percentage of weight loss on Campus (Male) ^{ES} | Daris George (Couples 3) | 43.64% |
| Highest percentage of weight loss on Campus (Female) ^{ES} | Tara Costa (Couples 2) | 45.23% |
| Longest Time Gone Without Falling Below the Yellow Line ^{ES} | Tara Costa (Couples 2) | 18 weeks |
| Most Time Losing Double Digits in a row in the Weigh-Ins | Danny Cahill (Second Chances) and Michael Ventrella (Couples 2) | 7 weeks |
| Longest Running Couple (Male Team – Finalists)^{ES} | Mike Morelli and Ron Morelli (Couples 2) | 18 weeks |
| Longest Running Couple (Female Team – Finalists)^{ES} | Olivia Ward and Hannah Curlee (Couples 4) | 20 weeks |
| Longest Running Couple (Male & Female Team – Finalists)^{ES} | Conda Britt and Jeremy Britt (No Excuses) | 15 weeks |
| Longest Time Gone Without Facing Elimination | Tara Costa (Couples 2) | 18 weeks |
| Most Challenges Won | Tara Costa (Couples 2) | 11 |

== See also ==
- The Biggest Loser (international editions)
