= Fit for TV: The Reality of The Biggest Loser =

2025 US television documentary miniseries

- Release poster
- Genre: Docuseries
- Directed by: Skye Borgman
- Composer: Chase Deso
- Country of origin: United States
- Original language: English
- No. of episodes: 3

Production
- Executive producers: Michael Gasparro; Andrew Fried; Jordan Wynn; Lana Barkin
- Producers: Alexa Burger Billings; Jonathan "Monty" Manto
- Production company: Boardwalk Pictures

Original release
- Network: Netflix
- Release: August 15, 2025

Fit for TV: The Reality of The Biggest Loser is a 2025 docuseries about The Biggest Loser, an American reality series featuring contestants competing to lose the most weight for a cash prize. It was released on Netflix on August 15, 2025.

== Summary ==
In the three-part documentary directed by Skye Borgman, former contestants and others involved with the series speak about their experiences and the show's impact.

== Production ==
Contestants interviewed include Ryan Benson (season 1 winner), Suzanne Mendonca (season 2), Jennifer Kerns (season 3, also medical adviser), Joelle Gwynn (season 7), Danny Cahill (season 8 winner), Tracey Yukich (season 8), Olivia Ward (season 11 winner), and Hannah Young (season 11 runner-up). Other interviewees include host Alison Sweeney, trainer Bob Harper, series co-creator and executive producer David Broome, producer J. D. Roth, medical adviser Robert Huizenga, and author and podcaster Aubrey Gordon.

Trainer Jillian Michaels declined to be interviewed for the series. She later criticized the documentary on her Instagram account.

== Reception ==
On the review aggregator website Rotten Tomatoes, the series holds an approval rating of 72% based on 18 critic reviews.

== See also ==
- Fat shaming
- Criticism of reality television
