= The Biggest Loser season 18 =

Season of TV series

The Biggest Loser
- Season 18
- No. of episodes: 10

Release
- Original network: USA Network
- Original release: January 28 – March 31, 2020

Season chronology
- ← Previous; Season 17 (Temptation Nation)

The Biggest Loser season 18 is the eighteenth season of the American reality television series The Biggest Loser which premiered on January 28, 2020. Season 18 marks the series' return from a four-year hiatus and is intended to not only show people the necessity of weight loss, but also the necessity of living a healthy lifestyle. It is the first season to air on the USA Network; the preceding seventeen seasons originally aired on NBC. Bob Harper who served as a trainer in previous seasons (as well as host of the final NBC season) returns as the host in season 18. The twelve contestants were trained by professionals Steve Cook and Erica Lugo.

== Format changes ==
The format is similar to that of seasons on NBC. Significant changes include:

- Prizes were reduced to $100,000 (plus a trip and a home gym) for the Biggest Loser and $25,000 for the At-Home Winner.
- Temptation challenges, in which contestants were tempted to consume high-calorie foods for potential rewards, were eliminated.
- All eliminations were made solely on the basis of weight lost; all voting was eliminated.
- All contestants were given a one-year membership to show sponsor Planet Fitness gyms, access to a nutritionist, and a support group.

== Contestants ==
Contestants are listed in chronological order of elimination.

Name	Teams	Status
Robert Richardson II, 32, Lafayette, Louisiana	Blue Team	Eliminated Week 1
PhiXavier "Phi" Holmes, 36, Washington, D.C.	Red Team	Eliminated Week 2
Domenico "Dom" Brugellis, 34, New York City, New York	Red Team	Eliminated Week 3
Delores Tomorrow, 34, Chicago, Illinois	Blue Team	Eliminated Week 4
Katarina Bouton, 23, Jacksonville, Florida	Red Team	Eliminated Week 5
Megan Hoffman, 35, Simi Valley, California	Blue Team	Eliminated Week 6 At-Home Prize Winner
Kim Davis, 58, Mulberry, Tennessee	Blue Team	Eliminated Week 7
Kristi McCart, 32, Riverview, Florida	Red Team	Eliminated Week 8
Teri Aguiar, 47, Columbia, Illinois	Red Team	Eliminated Week 9
Kyle Yeo, 28, Kansas City, Kansas	Blue Team	2nd Runner-Up
Micah Collum, 23, Oneonta, Alabama	Blue Team	Runner-Up
Jim DiBattista, 47, Essington, Pennsylvania	Red Team	Biggest Loser

== Weigh-ins and Eliminations ==
Contestants are listed in reverse chronological order of elimination.

Contestant	Age	Height	Starting BMI	Ending BMI	Starting Weight	Week									Finale	Weight Lost	Percentage Lost
Contestant	Age	Height	Starting BMI	Ending BMI	Starting Weight	1	2	3	4	5	6	7	8	9	Finale	Weight Lost	Percentage Lost
Jim	47	6'1"	50.8	31.8	385	363	350	340	330	323	310	300	290	280	241	144	37.40%
Micah	23	6'2"	41.9	29.1	326	315	305	298	289	282	277	269	262	254	227	99	30.37%
Kyle	28	5'9"	44.6	31.9	302	292	282	276	270	265	260	253	246	239	216	86	28.48%
Teri	47	5'5"	42.6	31.0	256	245	239	232	228	224	218	212	206	205	186	70	27.34%
Kristi	32	5'7"	41.3	29.9	264	253	245	241	235	228	226	220	215		191	73	27.65%
Kim	58	5'5"	40.3	33.9	242	232	227	223	218	214	211	207			204	38	15.70%
Megan	35	5'9"	42.8	30.6	290	279	268	262	254	249	247				207	83	28.62%
Katarina	23	5'10"	42.0	32.9	293	279	270	265	261	257					229	64	21.84%
Delores	34	5'4"	48.1	41.9	280	270	263	258	257						244	36	12.86%
Dom	34	6'0"	43.8	37.0	323	309	302	298							273	50	15.48%
Phi	36	5'6"	57.6	54.9	357	351	345								340	17	4.76%
Robert	32	6'8"	44.9	39.7	409	396									361	48	11.74%

Teams
Steve’s Team
Erica’s Team

Standings
Week's Biggest Loser (Team or Individuals)

BMI
Underweight (less than 18.5 BMI)
Normal (18.5 – 24.9 BMI)
Overweight (25 – 29.9 BMI)
Obese Class I (30 – 34.9 BMI)
Obese Class II (35 – 39.9 BMI)
Obese Class III (greater than 40 BMI)

Winners
$100,000 Winner (among the finalists)
$25,000 Winner (among the eliminated contestants)

=== Weigh-In Difference History ===
Contestant	Week									Finale
Contestant	1	2	3	4	5	6	7	8	9	Finale
Jim	−22	−13	−10	−10	−7	−13	−10	−10	−10	−39
Micah	-11	-10	−7	−9	−7	−5	−8	−7	−8	−27
Kyle	−10	−10	−6	−6	−5	−5	−7	−7	−7	−23
Teri	−11	−6	−7	−4	−4	−6	−6	−6	−1	-19
Kristi	−11	−8	−4	−6	−7	−2	−6	−5		-24
Kim	−10	−5	−4	−5	−4	−3	−4			-3
Megan	−11	−11	−6	−8	−5	−2				-40
Katarina	−14	−9	−5	−4	−4					-28
Delores	−10	−7	−5	−1						-13
Dom	−14	−7	−4							-25
Phi	−6	−6								-5
Robert	−13									-35

Notes

- Kyle's 7-pound weight loss in week 7 was displayed as 8 pounds due to a 1-pound advantage earned at the challenge.
- Micah's 7-pound weight loss in week 8 was displayed as 8 pounds due to a 1-pound advantage earned at the challenge.
- Jim's 10-pound weight loss in week 9 was displayed as 11 pounds due to a 1-pound advantage earned at the challenge.

=== Weigh-In Percentage History ===
Contestant	Week									Finale
Contestant	1	2	3	4	5	6	7	8	9	Finale
Jim	−5.71%	−3.58%	−2.86%	−2.94%	−2.12%	−4.02%	−3.23%	−3.33%	−3.45%	−13.92%
Micah	−3.37%	−3.17%	−2.30%	−3.02%	−2.42%	−1.77%	−2.89%	−2.60%	−3.05%	−10.63%
Kyle	−3.31%	−3.42%	−2.13%	−2.17%	−1.85%	−1.89%	−2.69%	−2.77%	−2.85%	−9.62%
Teri	−4.30%	−2.45%	−2.93%	−1.72%	−1.75%	−2.68%	−2.75%	−2.83%	−0.49%	-9.27%
Kristi	−4.17%	−3.16%	−1.63%	−2.49%	−2.98%	−0.88%	−2.65%	−2.27%		-11.16%
Kim	−4.13%	−2.16%	−1.76%	−2.24%	−1.83%	−1.40%	−1.90%			-1.45%
Megan	−3.79%	−3.94%	−2.24%	−3.05%	−1.97%	−0.80%				-16.19%
Katarina	−4.78%	−3.23%	−1.85%	−1.51%	−1.53%					-10.89%
Delores	−3.70%	−2.59%	−1.90%	−0.39%						-5.06%
Dom	−4.33%	−2.26%	−1.32%							-8.39%
Phi	−1.68%	−1.71%								-1.45%
Robert	−3.18%									-8.84%

== Weekly Summaries ==
=== Week 1: "Time for Change" ===
First aired January 28, 2020
The series premieres with twelve contestants arriving at The Biggest Loser ranch where they will compete to lose the most weight by the end of the show. Contestants are divided into two teams: a blue team and a red team. Steve Cook serves as personal trainer for the blue team while Erica Lugo trains the red team. Following the division of the contestants into two teams, they make their way to the weigh-in room to establish their starting weight. The heaviest contestant is Robert, weighing in at 409 pounds. The heaviest female contestant is Phi, weighing in at 357 pounds. Shortly after their first workout, the contestants compete in their first challenge: a one-mile run. Phi had a difficult time keeping up, and despite encouragement from trainer, Erica, finished in last place by six minutes. The blue team won the challenge and with it a six-pound advantage in the final weigh-in.

Contestants enter a last-chance workout, in which they are pushed to their limits the night of the weigh-in. Katarina is shown vomiting into a bucket after an intense workout. Following the workout, contestants are weighed to determine who has lost the least weight and will be eliminated. Having won the week's challenge, the blue team received a 6-pound advantage, but ultimately lost despite the advantage. Robert was eliminated after having lost the least percentage of body weight out of his team members. It is revealed in a video clip that Robert now weighs 361 pounds, having lost 48 pounds, and along with future eliminated contestants, he is in the running for the At-Home Prize for weight lost after being eliminated.

=== Week 2: "A Big Loss" ===
First aired February 4, 2020
The blue team is upset by the loss of Robert. Delores says she feels as if her team had been cheated, and she insists that Phi should have gone home instead of Robert. Phi responds by explaining why she's proud of her 6-pound weight loss. After having lost the previous week, trainer Steve Cook repeatedly reminds the blue team that they are down a contestant and need to work harder. Megan becomes frustrated at Steve for these constant reminders, and is shown making snide remarks towards him. Despite this, she admits in support group that she does in fact trust Steve, and continues to follow his instructions. Other contestants spoke during support group about the psychological factors holding them back in this competition. Delores and Megan talked about issues of while Dom admits that he has quit everything he has ever done, and that he misses his daughter tremendously.

For the weekly challenge, each team must move eight 150-pound tires from a mud pit. The challenge was particularly difficult for Kristi who complained of knee trouble. For the second week in a row, the blue team won the challenge and with it a 5-pound advantage. At the weekly weigh-in, Phi and Kim had lost the least weight on their respective teams. The red team lost the weigh-in, and as a result Phi was eliminated from the competition having lost 6 pounds that week. In a video clip at the end of the episode, Phi reveals that she now weighs 336 pounds after having lost 21 pounds.

=== Week 3: "Supporting the Team" ===
First aired February 11, 2020

=== Week 4: "Messages From Home" ===
First aired February 18, 2020

=== Week 5: "Diving In" ===
First aired February 25, 2020

=== Week 6: "Overcoming Obstacles" ===
First aired March 3, 2020

The red and blue teams compete in an obstacle course challenge but Teri suffers an injury and snaps her ankle and is in a boot.

Megan from the blue team goes home.

=== Week 7: "Going Solo" ===
First aired March 10, 2020
The red team and blue team become one as the contestants transition from teams to singles. From now on, it is each contestant's individual percentage of weight loss that determines whether or not he/she falls below the yellow line.

Kyle was the winner of this week's challenge, receiving a 1 lb advantage at the weigh-in. At the weigh-in, Kim loses 4 pounds, falling below the red line and is automatically eliminated. Kim reveals in a video clip that she has been able to further her weight-loss journey at home.

=== Week 8: "Boosting Morale" ===
First aired March 17, 2020
In their support group, contestants received video messages from family members to encourage them.

The weekly challenge involved circuit training with five exercises. Contestants rode an assault bike, pushed weighted sleds, rowed, pulled tires, and threw sandbags. Micah won the challenge after finishing the course in just over 6 minutes, and with it gained an advantage of 1 pound in the weekly weigh-in. Kristi was eliminated after having lost the least that week. The top 4 are Jim, Micah, Kyle, and Teri. Kristi reveals in a video clip that she now weighs 198 pounds, with a total weight loss of 66 pounds.

=== Week 9: "Final Four" ===
First aired March 24, 2020
At this week's support group, the final four contestants watch videos of themselves on day 1, telling them how well they're doing now and warning them to never go back to who they were then. Jim's video leaves him in tears. He said he knew he was big, but he never saw himself like that.

The contestants competed in the same challenge they did in week 1: the one-mile run. This time, the winner of the challenge would be the most improved and would receive a 1-pound advantage at the weigh-in. Micah finished first, followed by Kyle, who was followed by Jim. With an improvement rate of almost 37%, Jim won the challenge and received a 1-pound advantage.

The contestants participate in their last last-chance workout on The Biggest Loser ranch. This week, Kyle and Micah train with Erica, while Jim and Teri train with Steve. This was to switch things up a little bit, and so the contestants wouldn't find themselves bored after doing most of the same workouts every day.

At the weigh-in, Jim loses 10 pounds and reaches a total weight loss of 105 pounds in just nine weeks. His weight loss counts as 11 pounds with his one-pound advantage. Micah loses 8 pounds and reaches a total weight loss of 72 pounds. Kyle loses 7 pounds and reaches a total weight loss of 63 pounds. Teri, the last woman standing, is the last to weigh in, hoping she can secure a spot as a finalist. She ended up only losing 1 pound, due to what she described as a bodily plateau after losing 6 pounds three weeks in a row. Teri reached a total weight loss of 51 pounds. With a percentage of weight loss of 0.49%, Teri was eliminated, making Jim, Kyle, and Micah the three finalists.

=== Finale ===
First aired March 31, 2020
All twelve contestants return to The Biggest Loser campus for one final weigh-in, to see where they've come since they started. One person will win $100,000 and the title of The Biggest Loser. One of the eliminated contestants will win the $25,000 At-Home Prize.

A final support group was held to show off the contestants' success and discuss personal victories, both physically and mentally/emotionally. Tests were done a second time, and the results were much better than those during week 1.

The top three at-home contestants weighed in. Teri weighed in first, having lost a total of 70 pounds for a percentage of 27.34%. Megan weighed in second, having lost 83 pounds for a percentage of 28.62%. Kristi weighed in last, having lost 73 pounds for a percentage of 27.65%. Megan was announced to be the winner of the $25,000 at-home prize.

The three finalists weighed in last, to see who would be crowned The Biggest Loser and win the grand prize of $100,000. Micah weighed in first, having lost a total of 99 pounds for a percentage of 30.37%. Kyle weighed in second, having lost a total of 86 pounds for a percentage of 28.48%. Jim weighed in last, having to have lost at least 117 pounds to win. Jim lost a total of 144 pounds, for a percentage of 37.40%, and officially became the eighteenth Biggest Loser.

It is revealed in a video clip after the final weigh-in that Jim had lost 11 more pounds since the finale, weighing in at 230 pounds, having lost a total of 155 pounds.
