= Kai Hibbard =

American activist, social worker, writer, and former reality TV participant

- Born: August 23, 1978 (age 48); Kodiak, Alaska, U.S.
- Other name: Kai Zwierstra
- Occupations: LMSW, body acceptance activist, writer, public speaker
- Years active: 2006-present
- Known for: The Biggest Loser; BEDA; Writing for xoJane and Cracked

Kai Hibbard (born August 23, 1978) is an American activist, social worker, writer, and former reality TV participant, who spoke out about the negative ways in which appearing on The Biggest Loser affected her physical and mental health, along with highlighting the research that shows it also negatively affects viewers. She is a published academic researcher, has been published on xoJane and her Cracked article inspired an off-Broadway play, Taught. She has written a fictional account of weight loss reality television, that she self-published in December 2017, and speaks at conferences on the topics of body acceptance, mental health, and weight loss reality television.

== Personal life ==
Kai Hibbard was born in 1978 in Kodiak, Alaska, to Audrey Aflague, a nurse of Chamorro heritage, and Lawrence Hibbard, a member of the United States Coast Guard, the second of the couple's three daughters. She went to college for her undergraduate education in Hawaii and Alaska. After completing her undergraduate work, she worked as an aerobics instructor, a child protective services worker for the State of Alaska, and a law office assistant. In 2006, she was awarded a full scholarship to University of Maine Law School. She is married and has a young autistic son.

== Professional life ==
In August 2011, Hibbard joined the Alaska Army National Guard and was subsequently discharged in 2014 after breaking her pelvis and her right foot while on active duty at Fort Benning. In November 2015, continuing with body acceptance activism both online and in person, Hibbard was a featured speaker at the Binge Eating Disorder Association (BEDA) national conference addressing the positive effects body acceptance has on physical and mental health along with her personal journey into activism and social work in the aftermath of reality television.

In 2016, she was the keynote speaker for the East Coast Body Positive Fitness Alliance conference in Boston and executive produced the off-Broadway play Taught. In addition, she appeared throughout 2016 as an expert voice and body acceptance activist for CNN's HLN.

Given an opportunity to recount her experiences in writing in addition to speaking engagements, she penned a piece for xoJane in January 2015 with academic citations detailing her reflections and education on her experiences on weight loss reality TV.

In December 2018, Hibbard published her first "Losing It: A Fictional Reimagining of my Time on Weight Loss Reality TV", a fictionalized version of her time on weight loss reality TV.

== Academic career ==
Hibbard graduated with honors from University of Alaska Anchorage with a BA in Justice, a BA in psychology and a minor in English. She was accepted to the University of Maine Law School but chose instead to pursue an MSW at University of Alaska Anchorage; she then took a leave of absence in 2008 to start a family and join the Alaska Army National Guard. In 2016 Hibbard was contacted by a professor, Darren D. Moore, Ph.D., LMFT from Mercer University School of Medicine, department of Psychiatry and Behavioral Sciences, Marriage and Family Therapy Program, now with Alliant International University, Couple and Family Therapy Program about research regarding the experience of significant weight loss and the psychological effects of participating in weight loss reality television. She became a member of the research team, and completed qualitative research published March 2017 and again in April 2018 in The Qualitative Report under her married name Zwierstra. In 2018, she completed a MSW at the University of New England and is now a licensed LMSW in the state of Maryland.

== Activism ==
In April 2006, Hibbard was selected as one of 14 cast members for season 3 of the US version of The Biggest Loser. She went on to lose 118 pounds and take second place at the finale. During the filming of the show, Hibbard was featured as the cover model for the December 2006 issue of Prevention magazine. Following the finale and airing of The Biggest Loser Hibbard was featured as the cover model on the April 2007 issue of Woman's World magazine. In May 2007, Hibbard gave a Time magazine interview where she denounced the methods used on The Biggest Loser and brought light to the unhealthy techniques used to cut weight for the show, starting her career in activism for body acceptance and critical analysis of weight loss reality television. She was quoted in The New York Times in October 2007 discussing the dehydration and unhealthy techniques used to achieve weight loss on The Biggest Loser. In March 2009, she followed up with a spotlight interview in the Anchorage Daily News detailing the health struggles of life since appearing on reality television. She appeared as the spokesperson for Body Renew Gyms in Alaska from 2008 through 2009, then in 2010 partnered with David McLane to appear in their marketing materials for a line of vitamins and supplements, parting ways when the company went in a different direction that Hibbard felt was against her message of activism. In April 2010, Eric Deggans, then with the Tampa Bay Times, published an interview with Hibbard detailing the "unhealthy misleading" attributes of the show. In June that same year Hibbard appeared on The Early Show detailing the harsh unhealthy reality of weight loss reality television. ABC News picked up the story in that same month of 2010 with a piece detailing Hibbard's renunciation of the show's methods. The Huffington Post also picked up the interview. The story gained more traction when Hibbard did an interview with Golda Poretsky of BodyLoveWellness that was taken by Perez Hilton.

In 2013, when Season 15 The Biggest Loser winner Rachel Frederickson won with a BMI in the unhealthy range, Hibbard was once again thrust into the spotlight because she had previously warned that results like this were inevitable with the methods used on the show. In February 2014 The New York Times interviewed Hibbard about the show and how reality television affects viewers and participants negatively. That same month, Hibbard recounted to the Huffington Post the lack of aftercare contestants receive in the aftermath of the show. In May 2014, Hibbard completed an interview/collaborated on a piece for Cracked, "Five Details They Cut From My Season of The Biggest Loser", which was viewed over two million times. It was one of that year's most popular articles, and was picked up by The Huffington Post and led to the 2016 off-Broadway play, Taught, loosely based on Hibbard's experiences written by Mercedes Lake. In June 2014, the show's arguably most famous trainer Jillian Michaels left the show, stating she was "deeply concerned" about the show's "poor care of the contestants", lending credence to Hibbard's claims of unhealthy physical and psychological methods used by the show.

In January 2015, the New York Post published an article detailing some of the experiences Hibbard had on The Biggest Loser along with the support of unnamed anonymous fellow contestants. Hibbard referred to The Biggest Loser as an "unhealthy fat shaming sh*t show" in a January 2015 Redbook interview and producers of the show fired back in January 2015 in People magazine and on E! News Daily. In that same month of 2015 Us Weekly featured a profile detailing the health ramifications participation in The Biggest Loser had on Hibbard's physical health (though they got details like weight loss totals wrong) along with a piece in the Boston Herald on the topic.

Also in January 2015, fellow former Biggest Loser contestants Rulon Gardner, Suzanne Mendonca, Lezlye Donahue and Joelle Gwynn came forward in a New York Post piece supporting Hibbard's previous claims about the show's practices and alleging that contestants' health is adversely affected. That piece was followed in May 2015 with a piece also in the New York Post alleging drug use on set as directed by the show, and a lawsuit against one of the contestants, Joelle Gwynn, was initiated by Richard Huizenga, the doctor associated with the show.

In 2016, the results of a long-term study by the National Institute of Health (NIH) were released that documented the weight gain and loss of contestants in season 8. The study found that most of the 16 contestants regained their weight, and in some cases, weighed more than before they entered the contest. The New York Times reported: "When the show began, the contestants, though hugely overweight, had normal metabolisms for their size, meaning they were burning a normal number of calories for people of their weight. When it ended, their metabolisms had slowed radically and their bodies were not burning enough calories to maintain their thinner sizes. ... What shocked the researchers was what happened next: As the years went by and the numbers on the scale climbed, the contestants’ metabolisms did not recover. They became even slower, and the pounds kept piling on. It was as if their bodies were intensifying their effort to pull the contestants back to their original weight." The article quoted Dr. Michael Rosenbaum, who said, "The difficulty in keeping weight off reflects biology, not a pathological lack of willpower." Hibbard spearheaded the wave of former contestants, demanding NBC cancel the show in light of years of contestant statements and this study's results.
