= Steve Cook (bodybuilder) =

American bodybuilder (born 1984)

- Professional bodybuilder
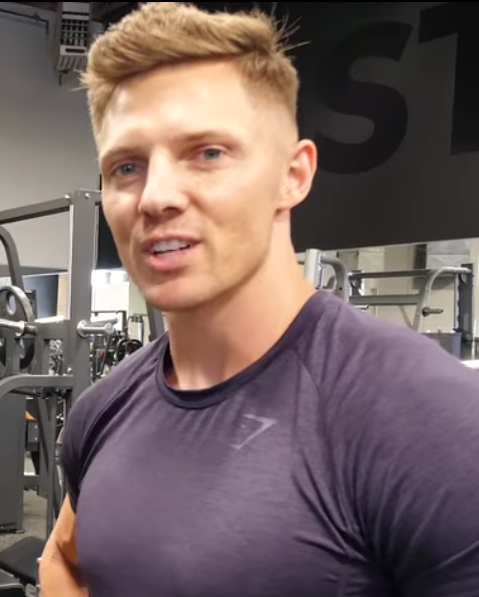
- Cook in 2018

Personal info
- Born: December 10, 1984 (age 41); Boise, Idaho, U.S.

Best statistics
- Height: 6 ft 0 in (183 cm)
- Weight: Contest: 205 lb (93 kg); Off season: 215 lb (98 kg)

Professional (Pro) career
- Best win: Mr. Olympia Top Ten; 2013–2014
- Active: Yes

Steven Cook (born December 10, 1984), known professionally as Steve Cook, is an American professional bodybuilder and two-time Mr. Olympia top ten finisher.

He is also known for his work on YouTube. In July 2020, his channel had 1.3 million subscribers.

== Early life ==
Cook was born on December 10, 1984. He was raised in Boise, Idaho, where his father worked as a high school athletic director. He grew up doing various sports, including wrestling.

Cook attended Dixie State University, now named Utah Tech University, where he was a linebacker for the NCAA Division II Dixie State Trailblazers football team. He completed his bachelor of science in Integrated Studies—biology/psychology.

== Career ==
After college, Cook worked as a waiter at Texas Roadhouse.

He got his start in professional bodybuilding at a Muscle & Fitness event during Mr. Olympia weekend in 2010. After winning the M&F Male Model Search, he soon became a bodybuilding.com and Optimum Nutrition spokesmodel.

He took part in the Gold's Classic Treasure Valley Natural Bodybuilding Championship, and won. He has won the Fit Body Competition, which Bodybuilding.com organizes. A year later in 2011, Cook also won the Naturally Bodybuilding Championship hosted by the NPC Iron Man magazine. He has a title from a NPC Junior National Championship.

Cook has won the IFBB Houston Pro twice, in 2012 and 2014.

Cook is a co-owner of the fitness app Fitness Culture and gym of the same name in St. George, Utah.

Cook was a coach on season 18 of The Biggest Loser on USA Network.

== Competitive history ==
- 2010 ABFF 5th Annual Golds Classic Treasure Valley Natural Bodybuilding, Fitness, Figure, and Bikini Championships 1st
- 2010 ABFF 5th Annual Golds Classic Treasure Valley Natural Bodybuilding, Fitness, Figure, and Bikini Championships 1st
- 2010 Bodybuilding.com Fit Body Competition 1st
- 2011 NPC Iron Man Magazine Naturally Bodybuilding, Figure and Bikini Championships 1st
- 2011 NPC Junior USA Championships 3rd
- 2011 NPC Junior National Championships 1st
- 2012 IFBB Houston Pro 1st
- 2013 IFBB Olympia Weekend 8th
- 2014 IFBB Dallas Pro 1st
- 2014 IFBB Olympia Weekend 5th

== Personal life ==
Cook got married at 21 and divorced at 23.

In 2021, Cook proposed to fellow Gymshark athlete, Australian Morgan Rose-Moroney, after having been dating since late 2019. They have been married since May 2022.

== See also ==
- List of male professional bodybuilders
