= The Biggest Loser season 4 =

The Biggest Loser
- Season 4
- No. of episodes: 15

Release
- Original network: NBC
- Original release: September 11 – December 18, 2007

Season chronology
- ← Previous; Season 3 Next → Season 5 (Couples)

The Biggest Loser season 4 is the fourth season of the NBC reality television series entitled The Biggest Loser. The fourth season premiered on September 11, 2007, with 18 overweight contestants in a weight loss competition for an ultimate prize of $250,000. The Biggest Loser campus was located at California State University Channel Islands in Camarillo, California.

The season four contestants were divided into 3 teams: the Red team, led by trainer Kim Lyons; the Blue team, led by trainer Bob Harper; and the Black team, led by trainer Jillian Michaels. The teams were formed on the first episode, with the Red and Blue teams being selected by the two players who had won a foot race across the desert. The Black team was formed with the 6 remaining contestants who were not selected for the Red and Blue teams. While the Red and Blue teams returned to the Biggest Loser campus, the Black team was left behind, believing that they had been eliminated already. Instead, they remained in the desert and trained in secret with their trainer, Jillian, until they arrived on campus for the weigh-in at the end of week 2.

== Teams ==
Each week, the team that has lost the lowest percentage of their total weight must eliminate one member. On the losing team, the team member who has lost the highest percentage of weight that week is immune and cannot be voted out.

In the seventh week, the teams were dissolved and split into trios. Jez won a temptation and the right to decide the trios:

- Jez, Neil and Isabeau;
- Hollie, David and Kae;
- Bill, Julie and Amy;
- Nicole, Ryan and Bryan

The individual players, regardless of which trio they belonged to, were allowed the option of continuing to work with their original trainer or switching to another trainer. Only Amy, who felt betrayed by Kim's negative comments prior to the previous week's elimination, opted to change trainers, choosing to train with Jillian.

That same week, Neil, a contestant on the original blue team, ignited controversy when he threw the weigh-in by water loading, which resulted in a weight gain of 17 pounds. He did this in an effort to forcibly eliminate a black team member, and it resulted in Jez's elimination. The following week, he lost 33 pounds. This made him the greatest gainer in one week and the second greatest loser in another week at that time, occurring in back-to-back weeks.

Although they trained separately, the trios competed together in challenges and at the weigh-ins. The trio with the lowest combined percentage of weight loss is considered to have fallen below the yellow line, and its members are up for elimination. The remaining trios each receive one vote during the elimination. In the event of a tie, the trio member with the lowest percentage of weight loss is eliminated.

During the ninth week, the trios were dissolved and the players split into pairs for Green Week. The pairs were: Kae and Amy; Hollie and Bryan; Nicole and Neil; Isabeau and Ryan; Bill and Julie. The contestants competed in their pairs at the challenges and at the weigh-ins. One member of the pair with the lowest percentage of weight loss was eliminated.

During the 10th week, the pairs were dissolved and the players were all competing as individuals. Although there was technically no longer a red, blue, or black team, the players still continued to work out with their original trainers and team, except for Amy who worked with the black team and even wore black colors instead of her original red.

In the 12th week, Bryan, the last remaining member of the red team, was eliminated, which meant that Kim's entire team was completely wiped out, and thus she was eliminated as well. This marks the first time that an entire team, along with a trainer, has been eliminated before the final weigh-in.

In the 14th and final week, Neil, the last remaining member of the blue team, was eliminated, which meant that trainer Bob has also been completely wiped out, and thus he too was also eliminated from the competition, leaving Jillian and her team to win it all. When he was eliminated, Isabeau reminded everyone about what Neil did to Jez seven weeks earlier. The black team wanted revenge against Neil after he sabotaged them, but could not get it because he constantly lost enough weight to keep himself above the yellow line; that is, until the final week of the on-campus competition, when he finally fell below the yellow line despite losing 10 pounds.

== Contestants ==
Contestant	Team	Status	Total votes
Amber Walker 30, Houston, Texas	Red Team	Eliminated Week 1	4
Lezlye Donahue, 34, Metairie, Louisiana	Red Team	Eliminated Week 2	4
Jerry Lisenby, 62, Peoria, Illinois	Blue Team	Eliminated Week 3	3
Patty Gonzalez, 34, San Diego, California	Blue Team	Eliminated Week 4	3
Jim Germanakos, 40, Long Island, New York	Black Team	Eliminated Week 5	4
Phil Hawk, 27, Powell, Ohio	Red Team	Eliminated Week 6	5
Jez Luckett, 24, Garden City, Kansas	Black Team	Eliminated Week 7	2
David Griffin, 31, Cedar Hill, Tennessee	Red Team	Eliminated Week 8	2
Ryan Rodriguez, 29, Jackson Heights, New York	Blue Team	Eliminated Week 9	6
Amy Zimmer, 28, Rochester, New York	Red Team	Eliminated Week 10	6
Kae Whang, 27, Clark, New Jersey	Blue Team	Eliminated Week 11	4
Bryan Washington, 29, Riverdale, Georgia	Red Team	Eliminated Week 12	6
Nicole Michalik, 26, Philadelphia, Pennsylvania	Blue Team	Eliminated Week 13	4
Neil Tejwani, 25, Marblehead, Massachusetts	Blue Team	Eliminated Week 14	6
Isabeau Miller, 21, Franklin, Tennessee	Black Team	3rd Runner-Up	2
Hollie Self, 28, Phoenix, Arizona	Black Team	2nd Runner-Up	1
Julie Hadden, 34, Jacksonville, Florida	Black Team	Runner-Up	1
Bill Germanakos, 40, Long Island, New York	Black Team	Biggest Loser	0

== Weigh-ins and eliminations ==
Contestant	Age	Height	Starting BMI	Ending BMI	Starting weight	Week															Weight lost	Percentage lost
Contestant	Age	Height	Starting BMI	Ending BMI	Starting weight	1	2	3	4	5	6	7	8	9	10	11	12	13	14	Finale	Weight lost	Percentage lost
Bill	40	5' 8"	50.8	25.8	334	313	301	298	285	279	268	261	251	242	234	228	222	213	204	170	164	49.10%
Julie	34	5' 2"	39.9	22.1	218	216	213	210	203	199	195	192	186	180	180	176	171	168	160	121	97	44.50%
Hollie	28	5' 7"	39.9	23.5	255	244	242	239	236	228	225	223	218	212	212	204	201	196^{*}	191	150	105	41.18%
Isabeau	21	5' 8"	45.3	28.1	298	290	285	280	272	264	259	255	255	246	241	234	230	225	217	185	113	37.92%
Neil	25	6' 2"	54.0	27.0	421	399	389	386	375	365	355	372	339	321	311	303	298	288	278	210	211	50.12%
Nicole	26	5' 6"	45.0	28.1	279	271	265	262	258	252	248	244	235	229	222	218	212	211		174	105	37.63%
Bryan	29	6' 0"	46.9	30.4	346	331	325	321	319	308	304	297	289	278	276	270	266			224	122	35.26%
Kae	27	5' 2"	41.1	23.4	225	205	200	197	191	184	178	174	168	163	159	156				128	97	43.11%
Amy	28	5' 6"	47.9	27.6	297	287	285	279	278	268	265	265	254	245	242					171	126	42.42%
Ryan	29	5' 10"	53.6	34.6	374	359	349	347	341	331	320	321	308	302						241	133	35.56%
David	31	6' 0"	49.9	30.9	368	348	344	338	337	328	323	315	312							228	140	38.04%
Jez	24	5' 8"	52.4	29.6	345	329	320	316	308	302	295	289								195	150	43.48%
Phil	27	6' 5"	47.8	30.6	403	377	372	363	358	346	342									258	145	35.98%
Jim	40	5' 7"	56.5	27.4	361	350	334	325	314	307										175	186	51.52%
Patty	34	5' 8"	42.6	32.8	280	267	265	260	255											216	64	22.86%
Jerry	62	5' 11"	41.4	26.1	297	266	256	254												187	110	37.04%
Lezlye	34	5' 5"	42.8	33.3	255	246	243													200	55	21.57%
Amber	30	5' 4"	50.6	36.2	295	288														211	84	28.47%

Teams
Member of Kim's team
Member of Bob's team
Member of Jillian's team
Game
Immunity (Team Biggest Loser)
Immunity (Reward Challenge)
Last person eliminated before the finale
Winners
$250,000 Winner (among the finalists)
$100,000 Winner (among the eliminated contestants)
BMI
Normal (18.5 – 24.9 BMI)
Overweight (25 – 29.9 BMI)
Obese Class I (30 – 34.9 BMI)
Obese Class II (35 – 39.9 BMI)
Obese Class III (greater than 40 BMI)
Notes

- Amy was originally on Kim's red team. But in week 7, Amy switched over to Jillian and was even wearing black clothes by week 10.
- Hollie won a one-pound advantage during the Week 13 challenge, so instead of 5 pounds, 6 pounds were counted towards her total.

=== Weight loss history ===
Contestant	Week														
Contestant	1	2	3	4	5	6	7	8	9	10	11	12	13	14	Finale
Bill	−21	−12	−3	−13	−6	−11	−7	−10	−9	−8	−6	−6	−9	−9	-34
Julie	−2	−3	−3	−7	−4	−4	−3	−6	−6	0	−4	−5	−3	−8	-39
Hollie	−11	−2	−3	−3	−8	−3	−2	−5	−6	0	−8	−3	−5	−5	-41
Isabeau	−8	−5	−5	−8	−8	−5	−4	0	−9	−5	−7	−4	−5	−8	-32
Neil	−22	−10	−3	−11	−10	−10	+17	−33	−18	−10	−8	−5	−10	−10	-68
Nicole	−8	−6	−3	−4	−6	−4	−4	−9	−6	−7	−4	−6	−1	-37	
Bryan	−15	−6	−4	−2	−11	−4	−7	−8	−11	−2	−6	−4	-42		
Kae	−20	−5	−3	−6	−7	−6	−4	−6	−5	−4	−3	-28			
Amy	−10	−2	−6	−1	−10	−3	0	−11	−9	−3	-71				
Ryan	−15	−10	−2	−6	−10	−11	+1	−13	−6	-61					
David	−20	−4	−6	−1	−9	−5	−8	−3	-84						
Jez	−16	−9	−4	−8	−6	−7	−6	-94							
Phil	−26	−5	−9	−5	−12	−4	-84								
Jim	−11	−16	−9	−11	−7	-132									
Patty	−13	−2	−5	−5	-39										
Jerry	−31	−10	−2	-67											
Lezlye	−9	−3	-43												
Amber	−7	-77													

=== Weigh-in percentages history ===
Contestant	Week														
Contestant	1	2	3	4	5	6	7	8	9	10	11	12	13	14	Finale
Bill	−6.29%	−3.83%	−1.00%	−4.36%	−2.11%	−3.94%	−2.61%	−3.83%	−3.59%	−3.31%	−2.56%	−2.63%	−4.05%	−4.22%	-16.67%
Julie	−0.92%	−1.39%	−1.41%	−3.33%	−1.89%	−2.01%	−1.51%	−3.13%	−3.23%	0.00%	−2.22%	−2.84%	−1.75%	−4.76%	-24.38%
Hollie	−4.31%	−0.82%	−1.24%	−1.28%	−3.39%	−1.32%	−0.89%	−2.24%	−2.75%	0.00%	−3.77%	−1.47%	−2.49%	−2.35%	-21.47%
Isabeau	−2.68%	−1.72%	−1.75%	−2.86%	−2.94%	−1.89%	−1.54%	0.00%	−3.53%	−2.03%	−2.90%	−1.71%	−2.17%	−3.56%	-14.75%
Neil	−5.23%	−2.51%	−0.77%	−2.85%	−2.67%	−2.74%	+4.79%	−8.87%	−5.31%	−3.12%	−2.57%	−1.65%	−3.34%	−3.47%	-24.26%
Nicole	−2.87%	−2.21%	−1.13%	−1.53%	−2.33%	−1.59%	−1.61%	−3.69%	−2.55%	−3.06%	−1.80%	−2.75%	−0.47%	-17.54%	
Bryan	−4.34%	−1.81%	−1.23%	−0.62%	−3.45%	−1.30%	−2.30%	−2.69%	−3.81%	−0.72%	−2.17%	−1.48%	-15.79%		
Kae	−8.89%	−2.44%	−1.50%	−3.05%	−3.66%	−3.26%	−2.25%	−3.45%	−2.98%	−2.45%	−1.89%	-17.95%			
Amy	−3.37%	−0.70%	−2.11%	−0.36%	−3.60%	−1.12%	0.00%	−4.15%	−3.54%	−1.22%	-29.34%				
Ryan	−4.01%	−2.79%	−0.57%	−1.73%	−2.93%	−3.32%	+0.31%	−4.05%	−1.95%	-20.20%					
David	−5.43%	−1.15%	−1.74%	−0.30%	−2.67%	−1.52%	−2.48%	−0.95%	-26.84%						
Jez	−4.64%	−2.74%	−1.25%	−2.53%	−1.95%	−2.32%	−2.03%	-32.58%							
Phil	−6.45%	−1.33%	−2.42%	−1.38%	−3.35%	−1.16%	-24.56%								
Jim	−3.05%	−4.57%	−2.69%	−3.38%	−2.23%	-43.00%									
Patty	−4.64%	−0.75%	−1.89%	−1.92%	-15.29%										
Jerry	−10.44%	−3.76%	−0.78%	-26.38%											
Lezlye	−3.53%	−1.22%	-17.70%												
Amber	−2.37%	-26.74%													

=== Total Overall Percentage of Weight Loss (Biggest Loser on Campus) ===
Bold denotes who has the overall highest percentage of weight loss as of that week

Contestant	Week													
Contestant	1	2	3	4	5	6	7	8	9	10	11	12	13	14
Bill	−6.29%	−9.88%	−10.78%	−14.67%	−16.47%	−19.76%	−21.86%	−24.85%	−27.54%	**-29.94%**	**-31.74%**	**-33.53%**	**-36.23%**	**-38.92%**
Julie	−0.92%	−2.29%	−3.67%	−6.88%	−8.72%	−10.55%	−11.93%	−14.68%	−17.43%	−17.43%	−19.27%	−21.56%	−22.94%	−26.61%
Hollie	−4.31%	−5.10%	−6.27%	−7.45%	−10.59%	−11.76%	−12.55%	−14.51%	−16.86%	−16.86%	20.00%	−21.18%	−23.14%	−25.10%
Isabeau	−2.68%	−4.36%	−6.04%	−8.72%	−11.41%	−13.09%	−14.43%	−14.43%	−17.45%	−19.13%	−21.48%	−22.82%	−24.50%	−27.18%
Neil	−5.23%	−7.60%	−8.31%	−10.93%	−13.30%	−15.68%	−11.64%	−19.48%	−23.75%	−26.13%	−28.03%	−29.22%	−31.59%	−33.97%
Nicole	−2.87%	−5.02%	−6.09%	−7.53%	−9.68%	−11.11%	−12.54%	−15.77%	−17.92%	−20.43%	−21.86%	−24.01%	−24.37%	
Bryan	−4.34%	−6.07%	−7.23%	−7.80%	−10.98%	−12.14%	−14.16%	−16.47%	−19.65%	−20.23%	−21.97%	−23.12%		
Kae	−8.89%	−11.11%	−12.44%	**-15.11%**	**-18.22%**	**-20.89%**	**-22.67%**	**-25.33%**	**-27.56%**	−29.33%	−30.67%			
Amy	−3.37%	−4.04%	−6.06%	−6.40%	−9.76%	−10.77%	−10.77%	14.48%	17.51%	−18.52%				
Ryan	−4.01%	−6.68%	−7.22%	−8.82%	−11.50%	−14.44%	−14.17%	−17.65%	−19.25%					
David	−5.43%	−6.52%	−8.15%	−8.42%	−10.87%	−12.23%	−14.40%	−15.22%						
Jez	−4.64%	−7.25%	−8.41%	−10.72%	−12.46%	−14.49%	−16.23%							
Phil	−6.45%	−7.69%	−9.93%	−11.17%	−14.14%	−15.14%								
Jim	−3.05%	−7.48%	−9.97%	−13.02%	−14.96%									
Patty	−4.64%	−5.36%	−7.14%	−8.93%										
Jerry	**-10.44%**	**-13.80%**	**-14.48%**											
Lezlye	−3.53%	−4.71%												
Amber	−2.37%													

== Voting history ==
Contestant	Week #													
Contestant	1	2	3	4	5	6	7	8	9	10	11	12	13	14
Eliminated	Amber	Lezlye	Jerry	Patty	Jim	Phil	Jez	David	Ryan	Amy	Kae	Bryan	Nicole	Neil
Bill	Arrived – Wk 2	X	X	X	Isabeau	X	Neil	David	?	Bryan	Kae	Bryan	?	Neil
Julie	Arrived – Wk 2	X	X	X	Jim	X	Neil	David	?	Bryan	Kae	Bryan	X	?
Hollie	Arrived – Wk 2	X	X	X	Jim	X	Jez	X	Ryan	Bryan	?	X	Nicole	X
Isabeau	Arrived – Wk 2	X	X	X	Jim	X	X	David	X	Amy	Kae	Bryan	Nicole	Neil
Neil	X	X	Jerry	Patty	X	X	X	David	Ryan	Amy	Nicole	Hollie	Julie	Eliminated Week 14
Nicole	X	X	Jerry	Patty	X	X	Jez	David	Ryan	Amy	X	?	X	Eliminated Week 13
Bryan	?	Lezlye	X	X	X	Phil	Jez	Kae	Ryan	X	Kae	X	Eliminated Week 12	
Kae	X	X	Nicole	Neil	X	X	Jez	X	Ryan	Amy	X	Eliminated Week 11		
Amy	Amber	Phil	X	X	X	Phil	Neil	David	Ryan	X	Eliminated Week 10			
Ryan	X	X	?	Patty	X	X	Jez	?	X	Eliminated Week 9				
David	Amber	Lezlye	X	X	X	Amy	Jez	X	Eliminated Week 8					
Jez	Arrived – Wk 2	X	X	X	Jim	X	X	Eliminated Week 7						
Phil	Amber	Lezlye	X	X	X	Amy	Eliminated Week 6							
Jim	Arrived – Wk 2	X	X	X	Isabeau	Eliminated Week 5								
Patty	X	X	Jerry	Nicole	Eliminated Week 4									
Jerry	X	X	Neil	Eliminated Week 3										
Lezlye	Amber	Phil	Eliminated Week 2											
Amber	Lezlye	Eliminated Week 1												

Immunity
X Below yellow line, unable to vote
X Not in elimination, unable to vote
? Vote not revealed
Valid vote cast
Eliminated or not in house
Last person eliminated before finale

== Episodes ==
=== Week 1 ===
18 contestants race through the desert. The first one to reach Bob and Kim become the captains of the Blue and Red team respectively. Jerry reaches Bob first and Phil reaches Kim first, and they earn the right to select five other contestants to fill out their teams. Kae, Neil, Patty, Nicole, and Ryan were selected for the Blue team while Bryan, Amber, Amy, David, and Lezlye were selected to the Red team. After not being picked, Julie, Jim, Jez, Isabeau, Hollie and Bill are met by Jillian, who informs them they are not going home, but forming the Black team, and will train in secret for two weeks before rejoining the competition on the ranch. The players on the ranch work out and then are confronted by the foods that caused their unhealthy weight gains.

The Red team wins the first challenge – pulling a plane – and receives letters from home. The Blue team wins the weigh in with 20+ pound losses by Kae, Neil and Jerry, the week's Biggest Loser, with a percentage weight loss of 10.44%.

The Red team votes (4 out of 5) to eliminate Amber. In an update, Amber reveals that she has lost 65 pounds since starting.

=== Week 2 ===
The Black team weighs in for the first time and loses 69 pounds. The Red team reconciles the loss of a teammate and vows to keep working. The Blue team goes for a hike and keeps pushing through aches and pains, and the Black team works out with a chip on their shoulder from being rejected.

The week's challenge has the teams climbing 10 stories of stairs. The Red team wins and David receives immunity by choosing the correct light switch. Kim confronts Amy and Lezlye about slacking off when the trainers are not there.

The Black team returns for the second weigh in and the Red and Blue teams aren't happy to see them. The Black team wins the weigh in behind strong performances from Bill (−12 pounds) and this week's Biggest Loser Jim (−16 pounds, with a percentage weight loss of 4.57%). The Red team is up for elimination for the second week in a row.

The Red team votes (3 out of 5) to eliminate Lezlye. Lezlye reveals that she has lost 55 pounds since she first arrived and now has let Hurricane Katrina go and moved into a new house with her son.

=== Week 3 ===
The teams face a temptation – the player who consumes the most calories in four minutes wins a 3-pound pass at the weigh in. Nobody on the Black team or Red team partakes in the challenge. Neil eats 1700 calories but his teammate, Patty, consumes over 2000 calories despite a team agreement that Neil be the only team member to eat. Bob and the Blue team hash out sore feelings after the temptation before hitting the gym.

The challenge pits the teams against children in three 100-meter dashes. The Red team wins the challenge and receives phone calls from home. The Black team has a breakdown in communication but smooths everything out.

The Red team wins the weigh in behind Phil's 9 pound loss during a week with a lot of low numbers. Jim is again the Biggest Loser of the week; his percentage weight loss is 2.69%. Tensions run high for the Blue team as they debate how they should approach elimination.

The Blue team votes (3 out of 5) to eliminate Jerry. Jerry is revealed to have lost 88 pounds since starting the show and encourages other seniors to make a change as well.

=== Week 4 ===
This week, the trainers face a temptation – they must eat cupcakes to win their team a 15-second advantage in the upcoming challenge. Neil pushes Bob to play for the Blue team, but in the end, none of the trainers eat.

The challenge has teams running down a hill to retrieve their flags. However, teams must bid how quickly they believe they can do it. The Black team bids that they can do it in 5 minutes, 25 seconds. However, they fall short by just a few seconds and are eliminated from the challenge. The Red team bids that they can do it in 5 minutes, 55 seconds. Phil plants the flag with 30 seconds left and gets his teammates to the flag with 18 seconds to spare. They earn immunity, though this is not revealed until the weigh in. Bob is disappointed that his Blue team didn't attempt the challenge.

The Black team wins the weigh in, carried Jim (−11 pounds), Julie (−7 pounds), and Bill (−13 pounds), this week's Biggest Loser with a percentage weight loss of 4.36%. Without immunity, the Red team would be up for elimination. Instead, it is the Blue team that heads to the elimination room.

The Blue team votes (3 out of 5) to eliminate Patty. Patty is revealed to have lost 61 pounds since she first came to the campus.

=== Week 5 ===
Alison announces that the kitchen is shut down, the gym is locked and the dorms are off limits. In other words, the teams are all headed to Jamaica. Bryan stays behind after experiencing pain in his chest.

For this week's challenge, the teams must transport themselves to the beach from a platform out at sea using ropes and rafts. Bryan returns in time for the challenge, having been medically cleared. The Black team completes the challenge before Blue or Red get any players to shore, and the team members win massages. The Blue team and Red team are put through last chance workouts while the Black team enjoys an evening at the spa.

Red team wins the weigh in during a strong week all around. Kae is the Biggest Loser, with a percentage weight loss of 3.66%. Black team loses for the first time since arriving at campus.

Isabeau, Hollie and Julie work to persuade Jez to team up with the girls and send one of Jim or Bill home. The Black team votes (4 out of 6) to eliminate Jim. Jim reveals to have lost 123 pounds since the show and includes his family in his training.

=== Week 6 ===
During the challenge, the team members must take turns to carry a weighted frame as far as they can. The team that moves their frame the furthest wins. Despite falling behind early, Phil makes up a ton of ground and wins the challenge for the Red team. David and Kim exchange words over his speed on the treadmill.

Jillian and Hollie receive word that Hollie's mother has suffered a relapse in her battle with leukemia. Hollie temporarily leaves the ranch to be with her mother, and the other players find out at the weigh in that Hollie's mother has died.

The Blue team wins the weigh in with big losses from Ryan and Kae. Bill is the Biggest Loser, with a percentage weight loss of 3.94%.

Kim tells the Red team that Phil and Bryan are carrying the team, significantly angering Amy. The Red team's vote results in a tie, so the Blue team decides to eliminate Phil over Amy. Phil reveals to viewers that he has lost 108 pounds and is now more active with his daughter.

=== Week 7 ===
The teams are dissolved and the players are divided into teams of three. The players face a temptation. They play a game of high-low where the chips are high calorie treats. Anything a player bet, they had to eat. Jez wins the temptation after calling Amy's bluff and earns the right to pick the new trios. Jez gets input from all the other players before making his decision. Kae, David and Hollie make up the first trio while Amy, Julie and Bill make up the second trio. Bryan, Nicole and Ryan make up the third trio, while Jez takes Neil and Isabeau for the last trio. The players seem in a consensus that Jez put the teams together fairly. Amy feels betrayed by Kim's honesty and decides to train with Jillian. The Black team is upset that Amy is infringing on their time with their trainer.

At the challenge, one teammate must push a heavy metal arm in a circle while their teammates stood on top of it. Bill carries his trio to victory, and he, Amy and Julie win a home gym.

At the weigh-in, Jez's strategy backfires on him as Neil throws the weigh-in and gains 17 pounds, forcing himself below the yellow line with Jez and Isabeau. Kae, Hollie and David win the weigh-in and Bill is the Biggest Loser, with a percentage weight loss of 2.61%.

After the weigh-in, Neil immediately heads to bed to avoid the other players while the Black team speculates what Neil's plan was and who else was in on it. David confronts Neil about throwing the weigh-in and convinces him to face the rest of the players. Neil initially denies gameplay, but eventually admits he threw the weigh in to force the elimination of a former Black team member. Bob is furious with Neil's gameplay, and Jillian is devastated when she learns that Neil betrayed his trio.

At elimination, Julie, Bill and Amy vote to send Neil home, but the other two trios vote to send Jez home. Jez is revealed to have lost 103 pounds since starting the show and has moved to California to start a new lifestyle.

=== Week 8 ===
The players express their disappointment in Neil's gameplay. Amy reveals that she was pressured by Neil to join him in throwing the weigh-in. The trainers try to convince the players to forget the game and get back to losing weight.

The challenge tests the players' endurance by seating them on a platform over water and having them hold up their own weight by a rope. Ultimately, Ryan, Bryan, and Nicole are the last remaining team and for winning, they receive the ability to vote individually at the elimination rather than as a team providing they do not fall below the yellow line.

Behind Neil's 33 pound loss, he and Isabeau win the weigh-in. He also records the highest weight loss in one week of The Biggest Loser. David, Hollie and Kae fall below the yellow line and are up for elimination. Neil is this week's Biggest Loser, with a percentage weight loss of 8.87%.

The trio of Bryan, Ryan and Nicole each hold individual votes from the reward challenge. Neil and Isabeau vote for David to alleviate concerns about a Red/Blue alliance. Bill, Julie, and Amy also vote for David, citing concerns about David's enormous potential. Bryan votes for Kae, but Nicole casts the deciding vote to eliminate David. David is revealed to have lost 105 pounds since beginning the show.

=== Week 9 ===
Alison announces Green Week and informs the players they will be abandoning trios and pairing off into duos. The player that comes closest to guessing the amount of calories in a large meat pizza and a soda will get to choose their duo, who in turn will choose the next duos. Nicole has the closest guess and wins control of the game. She chooses Neil as her partner. Neil and Nicole put Ryan and Isabeau together as a duo, who in turn put Julie and Bill together. Ultimately, Hollie and Bryan and paired together which leaves Amy and Kae as the last duo. Kae is not happy with Amy as her partner, given Amy's poor performance and attitude. Bob motivates her by putting a literal "X" on her back. In accordance with Green Week, the players are not allowed to use any electricity – for workouts or for cooking.

During the challenge, the duos have 30 minutes to transport as many cans as they can into a bin. The pair that recycles the most cans will win a 2008 Ford Escape Hybrid SUV. Ultimately, after hauling 98.4 lbs. of cans, Bill and Julie win the challenge. The victory is especially rewarding for Julie who had to give up her car to become a stay-at-home mom.

Neil and Nicole win the weigh-in, and Isabeau and Ryan fall below the yellow line, despite a nine-pound loss from Isabeau. Neil is this week's Biggest Loser with a percentage weight loss of 5.31%, and becomes the 5th contestant in the history of the show to lose 100+ pounds on the ranch.

Each duo votes to eliminate Ryan. An update reveals that Ryan has lost 109 pounds since starting.

=== Week 10 ===
Alison reveals that from here on out, the players will be competing as individuals. Amy dons a black shirt and returns her red shirt to Kim, who is still upset over Amy's departure. In a temptation the players eat donuts, searching for a token worth $5,000. All the contestants except Kae participate and ultimately Bill finds the token.

At the challenge, the players compete in a 24 km (15 miles) tri-athalon (20 km biking, 3 km running, 1 km swimming). Hollie wins and is granted a 24-hour trip home to see her family and immunity. Additionally, Hollie gains the power to give another player a 24-hour trip home and immunity and chooses Julie. If either Hollie or Julie gain weight, their immunity is void and they can fall below the yellow line.

Hollie and Julie return from their visit home in time for the weigh-in and both women lost zero pounds. Due to their immunity, Bryan and Amy fall below the yellow line. Bill is this week's Biggest Loser with a percentage weight loss of 3.31%, and becomes the 6th Biggest Loser contestant to lose 100 pounds while at the ranch.

The three Blue team players vote to eliminate Amy and the three Black team members vote to eliminate Bryan. Isabeau breaks from the black team and votes to eliminate Amy. Amy reveals in an update to have lost 100 pounds since starting the show.

=== Week 11 ===
Jillian is disappointed that Isabeau chose to keep a big threat in the game, but Isabeau ultimately couldn't send Bryan home when he deserved to be on the ranch so much more than Amy.

The contestants are in for a surprise and arrive at the NBC studios and are escorted to the Days of Our Lives set while Allison is rehearsing with some of her co-stars. The players receive ultimate makeovers, are surprised with visits from family members and take part in a photoshoot for Prevention magazine.

After the flair, the contestants head to this week's challenge, which requires them to keep themselves above a literal yellow line by climbing up ropes. Kae wins the challenge and is rewarded with a $5,000 shopping spree courtesy of Prevention magazine.

At the weigh-in, Kae and Nicole fall below the yellow line. Hollie is this week's Biggest Loser, with a percentage weight loss of 3.77%. The remaining players vote (4 out of 5) to eliminate Kae. In an update, Kae reveals to have lost 83 pounds since starting.

=== Week 12 ===
Kim tries to isolate where Bryan's nutrition is taking a hit and found out he was marinating meat in soy sauce.

America votes for their favorite challenge and they chose the poles over water challenge from Season 2. Bill wins the challenge and receives an all-inclusive stay at a luxury resort for them and their family. After the challenge, Nicole dives into the shallow end of the pool and knocked out a front tooth. The other players have fun looking for her tooth in the pool.

The players get good news from Dr. H about their health. Neil has shed a ton of fat, Julie has lost about 12 inches from her waist and Isabeau is no longer pre-diabetic and has the lowest insulin level of the remaining players. Bill is off blood pressure medicine and has excellent blood pressure now. Bryan's cholesterol has fallen from 279 to 176. Nicole lost 74 pounds of hydrated fat by gaining 11 pounds of muscle.

At the weigh-in Hollie and Bryan fall below the yellow line. Julie is this week's Biggest Loser with a percentage weight loss of 2.84%. The remaining players vote (3 out of 4) to eliminate Bryan. With Bryan's elimination, it marks the first time that an entire team has been eliminated before the finale. An update reveals that Bryan has lost 118 pounds and is now pursuing a career in music.

=== Week 13 ===
This week, the players have to learn about continuing their weight loss in the real world – this week they have to schedule around having a job!

Kim gets a video message from Bryan thanking her for inspiring him to change his life. Unfortunately, with no more team members, Kim leaves the campus. Bob teaches time-saving food portioning while Jillian preaches high-intensity training to burn more calories in a shorter amount of time.

The players go to work at a pizzeria washing dishes, cleaning bathrooms, taking out trash, and prepping and serving food. After a long day at work, the trainers are ready to get their teams back into the gym.

At the challenge, the contestants must jump on a trampoline to hit an elevated punching bag. Hollie wins the challenge and receives a one-pound advantage at the next weigh-in.

At the weigh-in Nicole and Julie fall below the yellow line. Bill is the Biggest Loser with a percentage weight loss of 4.05%. The remaining players vote (2 out of 3) to eliminate Nicole. Nicole has revealed to have lost 91 pounds since starting in an update.

=== Week 14 ===
After Nicole's elimination, Neil is the last non-Black team member left in the game.

At the last challenge, the players must load the weight they lost onto a scale, transport it back to their flag and bury it along with the scale. Isabeau wins the challenge and receives $10,000. The players get their final Last Chance workout.

At the weigh-in, despite excellent numbers, Neil, despite losing ten pounds, and Hollie fall below the yellow line. Julie is this week's Biggest Loser with a percentage weight loss of 4.76%. Isabeau's 81 pound weight loss is the biggest of any woman on campus in Biggest Loser history. The remaining players vote to eliminate Neil, meaning that for the first time in Biggest Loser history, the finals will consist of contestants from one team (Black).

=== Week 15 (finale) ===
Jim loses 186 pounds (51.52%) to claim the at home prize of $100,000. He edges out Neil (50.12%) and Jez (43.48%). Bill loses 164 pounds (49.10%) to win the title of the Biggest Loser and the grand prize of $250,000.

== After the show ==
NBC has announced that there will be another "Did They Keep The Weight Off" special, which will feature more than 40 Contestants from all 7 seasons so far. Those confirmed to appear in the episode include: Finalists Bill and Julie, and eliminated contestants Jim, David, Nicole, and Neil. There may be more, however these have been the only ones to be confirmed to appear.
