= Dolvett Quince =

American entrepreneur, fitness model, actor, and personal trainer

- Born: August 20, 1973 (age 53); Stamford, Connecticut, U.S.
- Occupations: Fitness model, personal trainer, entrepreneur, spokesmodel, actor
- Years active: 1993-present
- Height: 5 ft 9 in (175 cm)
- Website: http://www.dolvett.com

Dolvett Quince (born August 20, 1973) is an American entrepreneur, fitness model, actor, and personal trainer. He became widely known for his role as a trainer on the American version of The Biggest Loser from season 12 to season 17.

== Early life ==
Dolvett Quince is from a family of four children, all of whom were adopted. They were eventually placed into care to transition with a Jamaican couple. He credits his social worker and the couple for not splitting up the family. In an interview with Uptown Magazine in 2013 entitled "All Eyes on Dolvett Quince", he said,

"My adoption was bittersweet, because I had parents who were loving enough to [adopt] four strangers." "That’s a beautiful story, however, they’re very old school with a ‘you spare the rod, you spoil the child’ sort of mentality. So they only knew what they knew– and that was to beat it out of me." "I’m only in the position that I’m in now because that experience gave me a voice at a very young age. […] And with that strength, I’m able to help the underdog. The weaker person, the woman, the child, the obese person, the athlete that can’t get all the way to the finish line because I understand," he spoke in a soft tone. "I understand what it’s like to still believe in yourself when no one else believes in you and to push that out of someone."

== Career ==
Quince got his start working at an Atlanta YMCA. In an interview with Parade Magazine he cites his interactions with the people from the YMCA as a catalyst for fully pursuing personal training.

In 2004 he opened his own gym, Body Sculptor Inc. He began to build a celebrity clientele including Angela Bassett, Janet Jackson, Bert Weiss, Boris Kodjoe, Nicole Ari Parker Michael Jai White, and Justin Bieber.

In 2011, Quince joined the cast of The Biggest Loser alongside new trainer and tennis star Anna Kournikova.

In 2012, under Body Sculptor Inc, Quince released a DVD called Me and My Chair: The No Excuses Workout. In 2013, Quince wrote the book The 3-1-2-1 Diet: Eat and Cheat Your Way to Weight Loss—up to 10 Pounds in 21 Days, which went on to be a New York Times Best Seller.

Quince has been profiled in a number of magazines and television shows such as Parade Magazine, GQ, Men's Fitness, NBC News, Uptown Magazine, and TMZ. He has had acting roles in House of Payne, Real Husbands of Hollywood, and Sharknado: The 4th Awakens. He starred alongside Jane Krakowski in a Tropicana Products nationwide commercial for Trop 50. He has also had an affiliation with Cottonelle and their "Go Commando" campaign.

Quince has also been involved in a number of DVD releases throughout his years of involvement with The Biggest Loser, including The Biggest Loser: 30 Day Power X-Train, The Biggest Loser: 8 minute Body Blasters, and The Biggest Loser: Power Ab Blast.

In 2016 Quince launched an app called "Quincessential" on IOS and Android Platforms.

== Personal life ==
Quince married his wife Amanda in April 2021. He has one child named Isiah Quince from a previous relationship.

He is an advocate for the American Lung Association's "Lung Force."
