= The Biggest Loser season 1 =

Season of television series

The Biggest Loser
- Season 1
- No. of episodes: 10

Release
- Original network: NBC
- Original release: October 19 – December 14, 2004

Season chronology
- Next → Season 2

The Biggest Loser season 1 is the first season of the NBC reality television series entitled The Biggest Loser, which premiered on October 19, 2004. The show features overweight contestants competing to lose the largest percentage of their body weight and receive the title of 'Biggest Loser,' along with a $250,000 grand prize. The first season featured twelve contestants divided into two teams of six players. The teams were each led by a personal trainer, Bob Harper with the Blue Team and Jillian Michaels with the Red Team. The first season was hosted by Caroline Rhea.

== Contestants ==
Contestants are listed in chronological order of elimination.

Name	Teams	Status
Dana DeSilvio, 21, Nashville, Tennessee	Blue Team	Eliminated Week 1
Lizzeth Davalos, 26, Westminster, California	Red Team	Eliminated Week 2
Aaron Semmel, 34, Evanston, Illinois	Blue Team	Eliminated Week 3
Matt Kamont, 25, Slatington, Pennsylvania	Red Team	Eliminated Week 4
Dave Fioravanti, 39, Boston, Massachusetts	Red Team	Eliminated Week 5
Kelly MacFarland, 31, Belmont, Massachusetts	Blue Team	Eliminated Week 6
Andrea Baptiste, 29, Franklin, Massachusetts	Blue Team	Eliminated Week 7
Lisa Andreone, 26, Orlando, Florida	Red Team	Eliminated Week 8
Maurice Walker, 30, Nashville, Tennessee	Blue Team	Eliminated Week 9
Kelly Minner, 28, Coopersburg, Pennsylvania	Red Team	Third place
Gary Deckman, 40, Brooklyn, New York	Blue Team	Second place
Ryan Benson, 36, Van Nuys, California	Red Team	Biggest Loser

== Weigh-ins ==
Contestant	Height	Age	Starting BMI	Ending BMI	Starting weight	Week										Weight lost	Percentage
Contestant	Height	Age	Starting BMI	Ending BMI	Starting weight	1	2	3	4	5	6	7	8	9	Finale	Weight lost	Weight
Ryan	6'2"	36	42.4	26.7	330	311	308	294	281	278	262	253	250	240	208	122	36.97%
Gary	5'10"	40	32.6	22.4	227	215	213	206	195	190	186	183	177	175	156	71	31.28%
Kelly Min.	5'5"	28	40.3	27.1	242	227	225	215	211	211	197	194	192	187	163	79	32.64%
Maurice	5'6"	30	70.4	58.9	436	423	423	415	401	400	389	386	381	380	365	71	16.28%
Lisa	5'6"	26	38.1	28.9	236	226	225	213	207	206	197	192	190		179	57	24.15%
Andrea	5'9"	29	31.7	23.0	215	209	206	200	192	185	178	176			156	59	27.44%
Kelly Mac.	5'0"	31	43.6	29.5	223	210	209	204	194	190	181				151	72	32.29%
Dave	5'6"	39	40.4	28.9	250	240	240	233	225	219					179	71	28.40%
Matt	6'2"	25	39.8	32.0	310	288	291	274	264						249	61	19.68%
Aaron	6'5"	34	30.9	23.7	261	241	234	225							200	61	23.37%
Lizzeth	5'5"	26	27.8	24.1	167	164	164								145	22	13.17%
Dana	5'6"	21	28.2	24.7	175	170									153	22	12.57%

Teams
Member of Jillian's team
Member of Bob's team
Game
Last person eliminated before the finale
Winners
$250,000 Winner (among the finalists)
$100,000 Winner (among the eliminated players)
BMI
Normal (18.5 – 24.9 BMI)
Overweight (25 – 29.9 BMI)
Obese Class I (30 – 34.9 BMI)
Obese Class II (35 – 39.9 BMI)
Obese Class III (greater than 40 BMI)

=== Weight loss history ===
Bold denotes the contestant that lost the most pounds that week

Contestant	Starting weight	Week									Total weight Lost		
Contestant	Starting weight	1	2	3	4	5	6	7	8	9	Ranch	Home	Total
Ryan	330	−19	−3	−14	−13	−3	**-16**	**-9**	−3	**-10**	−90	−32	−122
Gary	227	−12	−2	−7	−11	−5	−4	−3	**-6**	−2	−52	−19	−71
Kelly Min.	242	−15	−2	−10	−4	0	−14	−3	−2	−5	−55	−24	−79
Maurice	436	−13	0	−8	**-14**	−1	−11	−3	−5	−1	−56	−15	−71
Lisa	236	−10	−1	−12	−6	−1	−9	−5	−2		−46	−11	−57
Andrea	215	−6	−3	−6	−8	**-7**	−7	−2			−39	−20	−59
Kelly Mac.	223	−13	−1	−5	−10	−4	−9				−42	−30	−72
Dave	250	−10	0	−7	−8	−6					−31	−40	−71
Matt	310	**-22**	+3	**-17**	−10						−46	−15	−61
Aaron	261	−20	**-7**	−9							−36	−25	−61
Lizzeth	167	−3	0								−3	−19	−22
Dana	175	−5									−5	−17	−22

== Episodes ==
=== Week 1 ===
- The 12 contestants are split into two teams: the red team and the blue team. The red team consists of Lizzeth, Matt, Dave, Kelly Min., Lisa and Ryan is trained by Jillian. The blue team consists of Dana, Aaron, Kelly Mac., Andrea, Maurice, Gary and is trained by Bob.
- The Blue Team wins the first challenge and receives five pounds of lard to use against the losing team at the weigh in.
- Matt is the biggest loser of the week.
- The Red Team wins the weigh in.
- Dana is the first person to be eliminated, and since being on the show, she lost 5 lbs, plus an additional 15 lbs. (meaning that she lost 20 lbs. total)

=== Week 2 ===
- The Red Team wins the second challenge and receives a day at the spa.
- Aaron is the biggest loser of the week.
- The Blue Team wins the weigh in.
- Lizzeth is eliminated, and since being on the show, she lost 3 lbs, plus an additional 9 lbs. (meaning that she lost 12 lbs. total)

=== Week 3 ===
- Everyone at the ranch resists the temptation to eat a cinnamon bun to get a telephone call. As a reward, they all win a 5-minute phone call.
- The Red Team wins the performance challenge and receives a gourmet meal from Chef Cruz. Additionally, they forced the Blue Team to lose their trainer right before the weigh-in.
- Matt is the biggest loser of the week.
- The Red Team wins the weigh in.
- Aaron is eliminated, and since being on the show, he lost 36 lbs, plus an additional 27 lbs. (meaning that he lost 63 lbs. total)

=== Week 4 ===
- Dave gives in to the temptation to eat a cupcake and have dinner with a loved one.
- This week's challenge is to climb 74 flights of stairs. Since Gary and Maurice are injured, Matt and Lisa will be competing for the Red team against Kelly Mac. and Andrea of the Blue Team. Lisa has a panic attack and has to stop at the 34th floor. Kelly Mac. and Andrea make it to the top and win a helicopter ride over the city for the Blue Team.
- The Blue Team chooses Matt of the Red Team to sit out the weigh in.
- Maurice is the biggest loser of the week.
- The Blue Team wins the weigh in.
- Matt is eliminated.

=== Week 5 ===
- The Red Team wins the challenge by building the tallest food pyramid. They win $5,000 of computer equipment and video messages from home.
- Andrea becomes the first woman to be the biggest loser of the week.
- The Blue Team wins the weigh in.
- Dave is eliminated.

=== Week 6 ===
- The Red Team wins the life guard training challenge and are treated to new makeovers.
- Ryan is the biggest loser of the week.
- The Red Team wins the weigh in.
- Kelly Mac. is eliminated after the Red Team is forced to break a tie between Kelly Mac. and Maurice.

=== Week 7 ===
- Caroline Rhea announces that it is now an individual competition. The two people who are below the yellow line (having the lowest percentage cumulative weight loss) will be up for elimination.
- The individual spin cycle challenge is won by Gary, who rode for 79 miles. In addition to being immune from the next elimination, Gary also receives a shopping spree and a surprise visit from his wife and kids.
- Ryan is the biggest loser of the week.
- Andrea and Maurice are up for elimination, and Andrea is sent home.

=== Week 8 ===
- This week's challenge has all the contestants wearing their previously lost weight in vests. The previous day, they had run a lap around the track. Whoever could get closest to their time from the previous day would win immunity and a 32" LCD TV. Ryan wins the challenge.
- Gary is the biggest loser for the week.
- Lisa and Maurice are up for elimination, and Ryan turns against his former teammate and is the tie-breaker vote to eliminate Lisa.

=== Week 9 ===
- Episode 9 was a retrospective into the first eight episodes.

=== Week 10 ===
- The prize for the weekly challenge is a $7,000 treadmill. There is no immunity. The contestants had to stand on bales of hay holding a bouquet of balloons. Ryan wins the treadmill.
- Ryan is again the biggest loser.
- Maurice and Kelly Min. are up for elimination
- Maurice is voted off, leaving Kelly Min., Gary and Ryan in the final three.
- Winning percentage will be based on weight loss and fat percentage lost.
- Kelly Min. has a total weight loss of 79 lb (36 kg) (33%) and decreased her body fat by 17% for 50%.
- Gary has a total weight loss of 71 lb (32 kg) (31%) and decreased his body fat by 23% for 54%.
- Ryan has a total weight loss of 122 lb (55 kg) (37%) and decreased his body fat by 18% for 55%.
- Ryan is declared the biggest loser and the winner of $250,000.

=== Week 11 – Reunion ===
- The Reunion show saw the 9 non-finalists compete for $100,000. Each was dunked in the water tank to check their fat loss and weighed.

== Voting History ==
Name	Week 1	Week 2	Week 3	Week 4	Week 5	Week 6	Week 7	Week 8	Week 9	Finale
Eliminated	Dana	Lizzeth	Aaron	Matt	Dave	Kelly Mac.	Andrea	Lisa	Maurice	Finale
Ryan	X	Lizzeth	X	Matt	Dave	X	Andrea	Lisa	Maurice	Biggest Loser
Gary	Dana	X	Andrea	X	X	Kelly Mac.	Andrea	Lisa	Maurice	Finalist (X)
Kelly Min.	X	Dave	X	Matt	Dave	X	Andrea	Maurice	X	Finalist (X)
Maurice	Gary	X	Aaron	X	X	Kelly Mac.	X	X	X	Eliminated Week 9
Lisa	X	Lizzeth	X	Matt	Dave	X	Andrea	X	Eliminated Week 8	
Andrea	Dana	X	Aaron	X	X	Maurice	X	Eliminated Week 7		
Kelly Mac.	?	X	Aaron	X	X	Maurice	Eliminated Week 6			
Dave	X	Lizzeth	X	Matt	Ryan	Eliminated Week 5				
Matt	X	Lizzeth	X	Lisa	Eliminated Week 4					
Aaron	Dana	X	Andrea	Eliminated Week 3						
Lizzeth	X	Dave	Eliminated Week 2							
Dana	Andrea	Eliminated Week 1								

Immunity
X Below yellow line, unable to vote
X Not in elimination, unable to vote
? Vote not revealed
Eliminated or not in house
Last person eliminated before finale
Valid vote cast

== Follow-up ==
Prior to the start of Season 4, a special episode was shown revisiting past contestants to see if they kept the weight off. Only Andrea and Kelly Mac. were featured, but on the official website, Aaron was also interviewed.

Andrea, who lost 59 lb (27 kg) in the competition, lost another 5 lb (2 kg) to bring her current weight to 151. This had made her the only contestant featured to actually maintain her weight loss.

Kelly Mac. gained 9 lb (4 kg) since the Season One finale to bring her weight to 160 lb (73 kg).

Aaron, who was eliminated in the third week and lost 25 of his 61 lb (28 kg) at home, gained 24 lb (11 kg) to bring his weight back to 224, only one pound less than when he left the ranch.

On the second-to-last episode of The Biggest Loser: Families, trainer Bob mentioned that Season One winner Ryan weighed as much today as he did when he first came to the ranch, indicating he had gained all the weight back and saying he had "learned nothing". Since the show aired in 2004, Benson has regained all but 10 or 12 lbs. The special "Where are they now" which aired on November 25, 2010, showed Benson's trainer Jillian Michaels confronting the season 1 winner. Ryan noted that he no longer felt the pressure of keeping the weight off once the show was over.

A second special to track contestants' progress, titled "Where Are They Now", aired on November 25, 2009. It featured contestants from the first seven seasons.

A third special, also entitled "Where Are They Now", was scheduled to air on November 24, 2010, featuring contestants from the first nine seasons.
