= The Biggest Loser season 7 =

Season of television series

The Biggest Loser
- Season 7
- No. of episodes: 20

Release
- Original network: NBC
- Original release: January 6 – May 12, 2009

Season chronology
- ← Previous; Season 6 (Families) Next → Season 8 (Second Chances)

The Biggest Loser: Couples 2 is the seventh season of the NBC reality television series The Biggest Loser. The season premiered on January 6, 2009, with 11 overweight couples (relationships to one another ranging from mother and daughter to husband and wife and cousins) competing for a cash prize of $250,000. Alison Sweeney is featured as the host, with trainers Bob Harper and Jillian Michaels. Helen Phillips won the competition with a total weight loss percentage of 54.47%.

== Contestants ==
| Contestant | Couples Team | Blue vs. Black | Singles | Status | Total votes |
|---|---|---|---|---|---|
| † Estella Hayes, 63, Wheaton, IL | White Team | | | Sent Home Week 1 | 5 |
| † Estella Hayes, 63, Wheaton, IL | White Team | | | Eliminated Week 2 | 5 |
| Gerald "Jerry" Hayes, 63, Wheaton, IL | White Team | | | Eliminated Week 2 | 5 |
| Nicole Brewer, Returned Week 13 | Red Team | | | Sent Home Week 1 | 4 |
| Nicole Brewer, Returned Week 13 | Red Team | | | Eliminated Week 3 | 4 |
| † Damien Gurganious, 33, Brooklyn, NY | Red Team | | | Eliminated Week 3 | 4 |
| David Lee, 23, Fuquay-Varina, NC | Orange Team | | | Sent Home Week 1 | 4 |
| David Lee, 23, Fuquay-Varina, NC | Orange Team | | | Eliminated Week 4 | 4 |
| † Daniel "Dan" Wright, 19, Willow Spring, NC | Orange Team | | | Eliminated Week 4 | 4 |
| Carla Triplett, 36, Detroit, MI | Silver Team | | | Sent Home Week 1 | 4 |
| Carla Triplett, 36, Detroit, MI | Silver Team | | | Eliminated Week 5 | 4 |
| Joelle Gwynn, 41, Detroit, MI | Silver Team | | | Eliminated Week 5 | 4 |
| † Blaine Cotter, 27, Mesa, AZ | Black Team | | | Eliminated Week 6 | 4 |
| Shanon Thomas, 29, Center Line, MI | Pink Team | | | Sent Home Week 1 | 4 |
| Shanon Thomas, 29, Center Line, MI | Pink Team | | | Eliminated Week 7 | 4 |
| Gregory "Dane" Patterson, 27, Mesa, AZ | Black Team | Blue Team | | Eliminated Week 8 | 3 |
| Amanda "Mandi" Kramer, 30, Boise, ID | Yellow Team | Blue Team | | Eliminated Week 10 | 3 |
| † Cathy Skell, 48, Shiocton, WI | Purple Team | Blue Team | | Sent Home Week 1 | 3 |
| † Cathy Skell, 48, Shiocton, WI | Purple Team | Blue Team | | Eliminated Week 11 | 3 |
| Aubrey Cheney, 28, Gooding, ID | Yellow Team | Blue Team | Yellow | Sent Home Week 1 | 4 |
| Aubrey Cheney, 28, Gooding, ID | Yellow Team | Blue Team | Yellow | Eliminated Week 12 | 4 |
| Nicole Brewer, 37, Brooklyn, NY | Red Team | | Red | Re-Eliminated Week 13 | 4 |
| Sione Fa, 28, Mesa, AZ | Blue Team | Black Team | Blue | Sent Home Week 1 | 1 |
| Sione Fa, 28, Mesa, AZ | Blue Team | Black Team | Blue | Eliminated Week 14 | 1 |
| Laura Denoux, 24, Miami, FL | Green Team | Black Team | Green | Sent Home Week 1 | 3 |
| Laura Denoux, 24, Miami, FL | Green Team | Black Team | Green | Eliminated Week 15 | 3 |
| Kristin Steede, 28, Greenville, WI | Purple Team | Blue Team | Purple | Eliminated Week 16 | 2 |
| Filipe Fa, 26, Mesa, AZ | Blue Team | Black Team | Blue | Eliminated Week 17 | 2 |
| Ronald "Ron" Morelli, 54, South Lyon, MI | Brown Team | Blue Team | Brown | Eliminated at Finale | America's Vote Victim |
| Tara Costa, 23, New York, NY | Green Team | Black Team | Green | 2nd Runner-Up | |
| Michael "Mike" Morelli, 18, South Lyon, MI | Brown Team | Black Team | Brown | Runner-Up | |
| Helen Phillips, 48, Sterling Heights, MI | Pink Team | Black Team | Pink | Biggest Loser | |

Total Votes only count votes that are revealed at elimination; if the contestant had already received the required number of votes needed relationship stated, the remaining votes are not revealed.

== Weigh-ins ==
Contestants are listed in chronological order of elimination. The combined weight of all the contestants was 7,411 pounds (pre-show). On average a contestant weighed 336.8 pounds (pre-show) one of the highest in the history of the show.

| Contestant | Age | Height | Starting BMI | Ending BMI | Starting weight | Week | | | | | | | | | | | | | | | | | Semi- final | Finale | Weight lost | Percentage lost |
| Contestant | Age | Height | Starting BMI | Ending BMI | Starting weight | 1 | 2 | 3 | 4 | 5 | 6 | 7 | 8 | 9 | 10 | 11 | 12 | 13 | 14 | 15 | 16 | 17 | Semi- final | Finale | Weight lost | Percentage lost |
|---|---|---|---|---|---|---|---|---|---|---|---|---|---|---|---|---|---|---|---|---|---|---|---|---|---|---|
| Helen | 48 | 5'6" | 41.5 | 18.9 | 257 | 245 | 237 | 231 | 225 | 216 | 211 | 205 | 198 | 193 | 189 | 182 | 177 | 171 | 169 | 162 | 161 | 154 | 147 | 117 | 140 | 54.47% |
| Mike | 18 | 5'11" | 54.1 | 25.2 | 388 | 366 | 359 | 348 | 339 | 330 | 317 | 307 | 297 | 286 | 278 | 270 | 264 | 253 | 248 | 243 | 235 | 224 | 214 | 181 | 207 | 53.35% |
| Tara | 23 | 5'9" | 43.4 | 20.5 | 294 | 273 | 272 | 264 | 252 | 240 | 229 | 222 | 211 | 200 | 200 | 198 | 195 | 189 | 186 | 182 | 177 | 169 | 159 | 139 | 155 | 52.72% |
| Ron | 54 | 6'0" | 58.3 | 32.3 | 430 | 398 | 386 | 377 | 370 | 366 | 361 | 354 | 349 | 343 | 337 | 327 | 317 | 320 | 308 | 302 | 298 | 289 | 279 | 238 | 192 | 44.65% |
| Filipe | 26 | 5'11" | 50.8 | 31.9 | 364 | 347 | 338 | 324 | 311 | 308 | 298 | 291 | 283 | 275 | 274 | 267 | 263 | 259 | 252 | 247 | 244 | 234 | | 229 | 135 | 37.09% |
| Kristin | 28 | 5'7" | 56.4 | 31.2 | 360 | 341 | 331 | 324 | 312 | 301 | 303 | 289 | 279 | 270 | 263 | 264 | 255 | 251 | 245 | 243 | 244 | | | 193 | 167 | 46.39% |
| Laura | 24 | 5'9" | 42.1 | 29.4 | 285 | 272 | X | X | 265 | 252 | 249 | 241 | 233 | 226 | 227 | 220 | 213 | 214 | 205 | 208 | | | | 199 | 86 | 30.18% |
| Sione | 28 | 6'0" | 50.5 | 30.7 | 372 | 349 | X | X | 324 | 316 | 305 | 296 | 286 | 283 | 277 | 273 | 266 | 260 | 256 | | | | | 226 | 146 | 39.25% |
| Nicole | 37 | 5'8" | 40.9 | 22.2 | 269 | 251 | X | X | | | | | | | | | 182 | 187 | | | | | | 146 | 123 | 45.72% |
| Aubrey | 28 | 5'5" | 41.4 | 32.3 | 249 | 236 | X | X | 234 | 224 | 223 | 216 | 211 | 203 | 200 | 195 | 191 | | | | | | | 194 | 55 | 22.09% |
| Cathy | 48 | 5'9" | 43.3 | 29.2 | 293 | 281 | X | X | 273 | 268 | 264 | 263 | 249 | 246 | 242 | 241 | | | | | | | | 198 | 95 | 32.42% |
| Mandi | 30 | 5'9" | 38.8 | 25.3 | 263 | 251 | 245 | 237 | 227 | 221 | 215 | 210 | 203 | 195 | 197 | | | | | | | | | 171 | 92 | 34.98% |
| Dane | 27 | 6'4" | 50.1 | 31.4 | 412 | 392 | 378 | 360 | 345 | 334 | 329 | 325 | 312 | | | | | | | | | | | 258 | 154 | 37.38% |
| Shanon | 29 | 5'5" | 47.1 | 31.8 | 283 | 270 | X | X | 255 | 246 | 241 | 238 | | | | | | | | | | | | 191 | 92 | 32.51% |
| Blaine | 27 | 6'8" | 40.1 | 27.4 | 365 | 351 | 335 | 323 | 312 | 303 | 299 | | | | | | | | | | | | | 249 | 116 | 31.78% |
| Carla | 36 | 5'8" | 57.6 | 38.2 | 379 | 368 | X | X | 348 | 339 | | | | | | | | | | | | | | 251 | 128 | 33.77% |
| Joelle | 41 | 5'8" | 47.0 | 34.8 | 309 | 296 | 294 | 288 | 278 | 278 | | | | | | | | | | | | | | 229 | 80 | 25.89% |
| Daniel | 19 | 5'8" | 69.0 | 47.4 | 454 | 424 | 421 | 406 | 394 | | | | | | | | | | | | | | | 312 | 142 | 31.28% |
| David | 23 | 6'0" | 53.3 | 47.5 | 393 | 377 | X | X | X | | | | | | | | 347 | | | | | | | 350 | 43 | 10.94% |
| Damien | 33 | 5'11" | 53.1 | 34.2 | 381 | 364 | 355 | 351 | | | | | | | | | | | | | | | | 245 | 136 | 35.70% |
| Jerry | 63 | 6'3" | 46.1 | 24.0 | 369 | 344 | 343 | | | | | | | | | | | | | | | | | 192 | 177 | 47.97% |
| Estella | 63 | 5'8" | 36.8 | 24.2 | 242 | 233 | X | | | | | | | | | | 197 | | | | | | | 159 | 83 | 34.30% |

Winners
US$250,000 Winner (among the finalists)
US$100,000 Winner (among the eliminated contestants)

Standings
Week's Biggest Loser
Week's Biggest Loser & Immunity
Immunity (Challenge or Weigh-In)
Last person eliminated before finale (by America voting)
Results from "At-Home Players" Weigh-in (Week 5)/Eliminated Players Weigh in (Week 13)
X Sent Home after first weigh-in for 30 days

BMI
Normal (18.5–24.9 BMI)
Overweight (25–29.9 BMI)
Obese Class I (30–34.9 BMI)
Obese Class II (35–39.9 BMI)
Obese Class III (greater than 40 BMI)

Weigh-In Notes and Weight Gains

- Kristin weighed 303 pounds after week 6, but her starting weight was displayed as 301 at the week 7 weigh-in.
- From Weeks 8–11, the remaining contestants were divided into a Black and a Blue team.
- Laura weighed 227 pounds after week 10, but her starting weight was displayed as 226 at the week 11 weigh-in.
- Kristin weighed 264 pounds after week 11, but her starting weight was displayed as 263 at the week 12 weigh-in.
- Ron weighed 320 pounds after week 13, but his starting weight was displayed as 317 at the week 14 weigh-in.
- Laura weighed 214 pounds after week 13, but her starting weight was displayed 213 at the week 14 weigh-in.
- Mike's weigh in from week 9 was carried over to episode 10 as a flashback due to broadcasting time.
- In Week 12, the remaining contestants started competing as singles, and were given their original couples color shirts.
- In Week 13, Nicole originally got immunity upon returning to the main competition. However, since she gained 5 pounds, she lost her immunity status, fell below the yellow line, was put up for elimination with Ron, and was subsequently re-eliminated.

=== Weigh-Ins Figures History ===
| Contestant | Week | | | | | | | | | | | | | | | | | Semi- final | Finale |
| Contestant | 1 | 2 | 3 | 4 | 5 | 6 | 7 | 8 | 9 | 10 | 11 | 12 | 13 | 14 | 15 | 16 | 17 | Semi- final | Finale |
|---|---|---|---|---|---|---|---|---|---|---|---|---|---|---|---|---|---|---|---|
| Helen | −12 | −8 | −6 | −6 | −9 | −5 | −6 | −7 | −5 | −4 | −7 | −5 | −6 | −2 | −7 | −1 | −7 | −7 | −30 |
| Mike | −22 | −7 | −11 | −9 | −9 | −13 | −10 | −10 | −11 | −8 | −8 | −6 | −11 | −5 | −5 | −8 | −11 | −10 | −33 |
| Tara | −21 | −1 | −8 | −12 | −12 | −11 | −7 | −11 | −11 | 0 | −2 | −3 | −6 | −3 | −4 | −5 | −8 | −10 | −20 |
| Ron | −32 | −12 | −9 | −7 | −4 | −5 | −7 | −5 | −6 | −6 | −10 | −10 | +3 | −12 | −6 | −4 | −9 | −10 | -41 |
| Filipe | −17 | −9 | −14 | −13 | −3 | −10 | −7 | −8 | −8 | −1 | −7 | −4 | −4 | −7 | −5 | −3 | −10 | -5 | |
| Kristin | −19 | −10 | −7 | −12 | −11 | +2 | −14 | −10 | −9 | −7 | +1 | −9 | −4 | −6 | −2 | +1 | -51 | | |
| Laura | −13 | -7 | | | −13 | −3 | −8 | −8 | −7 | +1 | −7 | −7 | +1 | −9 | +3 | -9 | | | |
| Sione | −23 | -25 | | | −8 | −11 | −9 | −10 | −3 | −6 | −4 | −7 | −6 | −4 | -30 | | | | |
| Nicole | −18 | -69 | | | | | | | | | | | +5 | -41 | | | | | |
| Aubrey | −13 | -2 | | | −10 | −1 | −7 | −5 | −8 | −3 | −5 | −4 | +3 | | | | | | |
| Cathy | −12 | -8 | | | −5 | −4 | −1 | −14 | −3 | −4 | −1 | -43 | | | | | | | |
| Mandi | −12 | −6 | −8 | −10 | −6 | −6 | −5 | −7 | −8 | +2 | -26 | | | | | | | | |
| Dane | −20 | −14 | −18 | −15 | −11 | −5 | −4 | −13 | -54 | | | | | | | | | | |
| Shannon | −13 | -15 | | | −9 | −5 | −3 | -47 | | | | | | | | | | | |
| Blaine | −14 | −16 | −12 | −11 | −9 | −4 | -50 | | | | | | | | | | | | |
| Carla | −11 | -20 | | | −9 | -88 | | | | | | | | | | | | | |
| Joelle | −13 | −2 | −6 | −10 | 0 | -49 | | | | | | | | | | | | | |
| Daniel | −30 | −3 | −15 | −12 | -82 | | | | | | | | | | | | | | |
| David | −16 | -30 | | | | | | | | | | | +3 | | | | | | |
| Damien | −17 | −9 | −4 | -106 | | | | | | | | | | | | | | | |
| Jerry | −25 | −1 | -151 | | | | | | | | | | | | | | | | |
| Estella | −9 | -36 | | | | | | | | | | | -38 | | | | | | |

Notes

- Kristin's 14 pound weight loss in week 7 was displayed as −12 due to her weight gain the previous week.
- Laura's 7 pound weight loss in week 11 was displayed as −6 due to her weight gain the previous week.
- Kristin's 9 pound weight loss in week 12 was displayed as −8 due to her weight gain the previous week.
- Ron's 12 pound weight loss in week 14 was displayed as −9 due to his weight gain the previous week.
- Laura's 9 pound weight loss in week 14 was displayed as −8 due to her weight gain the previous week.

=== Weigh-Ins Percentage History ===
| Contestant | Week | | | | | | | | | | | | | | | | | Semi- final | Finale |
| Contestant | 1 | 2 | 3 | 4 | 5 | 6 | 7 | 8 | 9 | 10 | 11 | 12 | 13 | 14 | 15 | 16 | 17 | Semi- final | Finale |
|---|---|---|---|---|---|---|---|---|---|---|---|---|---|---|---|---|---|---|---|
| Helen | −4.67% | −3.27% | −2.53% | −2.60% | −4.00% | −2.31% | −2.84% | −3.41% | −2.53% | −2.07% | −3.70% | −2.75% | −3.39% | −1.17% | −4.14% | −0.62% | −4.35% | −4.55% | −20.41% |
| Mike | −5.67% | −1.91% | −3.06% | −2.59% | −2.65% | −3.94% | −3.15% | −3.26% | −3.70% | −2.80% | −2.88% | −2.22% | −4.17% | −1.98% | −2.02% | −3.29% | −4.68% | −4.46% | −15.42% |
| Tara | −7.14% | −0.37% | −2.94% | −4.55% | −4.76% | −4.58% | −3.06% | −4.95% | −5.21% | 0.00% | −1.00% | −1.52% | −3.08% | −1.59% | −2.15% | −2.75% | −4.52% | −5.92% | −12.58% |
| Ron | −7.44% | −3.02% | −2.33% | −1.86% | −1.08% | −1.37% | −1.94% | −1.41% | −1.72% | −1.75% | −2.97% | −3.06% | +0.95% | −3.75% | −1.95% | −1.32% | −3.02% | −3.46% | -14.70% |
| Filipe | −4.67% | −2.59% | −4.14% | −4.01% | −0.96% | −3.25% | −2.35% | −2.75% | −2.83% | −0.36% | −2.55% | −1.50% | −1.52% | −2.70% | −1.98% | −1.21% | −4.10% | -2.14% | |
| Kristin | −5.28% | −2.93% | −2.11% | −3.70% | −3.53% | +0.66% | −4.62% | −3.46% | −3.23% | −2.59% | +0.38% | −3.41% | −1.57% | −2.39% | −0.82% | +0.41% | -20.90% | | |
| Laura | −4.56% | -2.57% | | | −4.91% | −1.19% | −3.21% | −3.32% | −3.00% | +0.44% | −3.08% | −3.18% | +0.47% | −4.21% | +1.46% | -4.33% | | | |
| Sione | −6.18% | -7.16% | | | −2.47% | −3.48% | −2.95% | −3.38% | −1.05% | −2.12% | −1.44% | −2.56% | −2.26% | −1.54% | -11.72% | | | | |
| Nicole | −6.69% | -27.49% | | | | | | | | | | | +2.75% | -21.93% | | | | | |
| Aubrey | −5.22% | -0.85% | | | −4.27% | −0.45% | −3.14% | −2.31% | −3.79% | −1.48% | −2.50% | −2.05% | +1.57% | | | | | | |
| Cathy | −4.10% | -2.85% | | | −1.83% | −1.49% | −0.38% | −5.32% | −1.20% | −1.63% | −0.41% | -17.84% | | | | | | | |
| Mandi | −4.56% | −2.39% | −3.27% | −4.22% | −2.64% | −2.71% | −2.33% | −3.33% | −3.94% | +1.03% | -13.20% | | | | | | | | |
| Dane | −4.85% | −3.57% | −4.76% | −4.17% | −3.19% | −1.50% | −1.22% | −4.00% | -17.31% | | | | | | | | | | |
| Shanon | −4.59% | -5.56% | | | −3.53% | −2.03% | −1.24% | -19.75% | | | | | | | | | | | |
| Blaine | −3.84% | −4.56% | −3.58% | −3.41% | −2.88% | −1.32% | -16.72% | | | | | | | | | | | | |
| Carla | −2.90% | -5.43% | | | −2.59% | -25.96% | | | | | | | | | | | | | |
| Joelle | −4.21% | −0.68% | −2.04% | −3.47% | 0.00% | -17.63% | | | | | | | | | | | | | |
| Daniel | −6.61% | −0.71% | −3.56% | −2.96% | -20.81% | | | | | | | | | | | | | | |
| David | −4.07% | -7.96% | | | | | | | | | | | +0.86% | | | | | | |
| Damien | −4.46% | −2.47% | −1.13% | -30.20% | | | | | | | | | | | | | | | |
| Jerry | −6.78% | −0.29% | -44.02% | | | | | | | | | | | | | | | | |
| Estella | −3.72% | -15.45% | | | | | | | | | | | -19.29% | | | | | | |

Notes

- Kristin's 4.62% weight loss in week 7 was counted as 3.99% due to her weight gain the previous week.
- Laura's 3.08% weight loss in week 11 was counted as 2.65% due to her weight gain the previous week.
- Kristin's 3.41% weight loss in week 12 was counted as 3.04% due to her weight gain the previous week.
- Ron's 3.75% weight loss in week 14 was counted as 2.84% due to his weight gain the previous week.
- Laura's 4.21% weight loss in week 14 was counted as 3.76% due to her weight gain the previous week.
- In Week 2, Daniel's weight-loss percentage was −0.47% with the one pound penalty.
- In Week 13, Sione's weight-loss percentage was −2.63% with the one pound advantage.
- In Week 17, Tara's weight-loss percentage was −5.08% with the one pound advantage.

=== Total Overall Percentage of Weight Loss (Biggest Loser on Campus) ===
Bold denotes whom has the overall highest percentage of weight loss as of that week

| Contestant | Week | | | | | | | | | | | | | | | | | Semi- final |
| Contestant | 1 | 2 | 3 | 4 | 5 | 6 | 7 | 8 | 9 | 10 | 11 | 12 | 13 | 14 | 15 | 16 | 17 | Semi- final |
|---|---|---|---|---|---|---|---|---|---|---|---|---|---|---|---|---|---|---|
| Helen | −4.67% | −7.78% | −10.12% | −12.45% | −15.95% | −17.90% | −20.23% | −22.96% | −24.90% | −26.46% | −29.18% | −31.13% | −33.46% | −34.24% | −36.96% | −37.35% | −40.08% | −42.80% |
| Mike | −5.67% | −7.47% | −10.31% | −12.63% | −14.95% | −18.30% | −20.88% | −23.45% | −26.29% | −28.35% | −30.41% | −31.96% | −34.79% | −36.08% | −37.37% | −39.43% | −42.27% | −44.85% |
| Tara | −7.14% | −7.48% | −10.20% | −14.29% | −18.37% | **-22.11%** | **-24.49%** | **-28.23%** | **-31.97%** | **-31.97%** | **-32.65%** | **-33.67%** | **-35.71%** | **-36.73%** | **-38.10%** | **-39.80%** | **-42.52%** | **-45.92%** |
| Ron | **-7.44%** | **-10.23%** | −12.33% | −13.95% | −14.88% | −16.05% | −17.67% | −18.84% | −20.23% | −21.63% | −23.95% | −26.28% | −25.58% | −28.37% | −29.77% | −30.70% | −32.79% | −35.12% |
| Filipe | −4.67% | −7.14% | −10.99% | −14.56% | −15.38% | −18.13% | −20.05% | −22.25% | −24.45% | −24.73% | −26.65% | −27.75% | −28.85% | −30.77% | −32.14% | −32.97% | −35.71% | |
| Kristin | −5.28% | −8.06% | −10.00% | −13.33% | −16.39% | −15.83% | −19.72% | −22.50% | −25.00% | −26.94% | −26.67% | −29.17% | −30.28% | −31.94% | −32.50% | −32.22% | | |
| Laura | −4.56% | -7.02% | | | −11.58% | −12.63% | −15.44% | −18.25% | −20.70% | −20.35% | −22.81% | −25.26% | −24.91% | −28.07% | −27.02% | | | |
| Sione | −6.18% | -12.90% | | | −15.05% | −18.01% | −20.43% | −23.12% | −23.92% | −25.54% | −26.61% | −28.49% | −30.11% | −31.18% | | | | |
| Nicole | −6.69% | -32.34% | | | | | | | | | | | −30.48% | | | | | |
| Aubrey | −5.22% | -6.02% | | | −10.04% | −10.44% | −13.25% | −15.26% | −18.47% | −19.68% | −21.69% | −23.29% | | | | | | |
| Cathy | −4.10% | -6.83% | | | −8.53% | −9.90% | −10.24% | −15.02% | −16.04% | −17.41% | −17.75% | | | | | | | |
| Mandi | −4.56% | −6.84% | −9.89% | −13.69% | −15.97% | −18.25% | −20.15% | −22.81% | −25.86% | −25.10% | | | | | | | | |
| Dane | −4.85% | −8.25% | **-12.62%** | **-16.26%** | **-18.93%** | −20.15% | −21.12% | −24.27% | | | | | | | | | | |
| Shanon | −4.59% | -9.89% | | | −13.07% | −14.84% | −15.90% | | | | | | | | | | | |
| Blaine | −3.84% | −8.22% | −11.51% | −14.52% | −16.99% | −18.08% | | | | | | | | | | | | |
| Carla | −2.90% | -8.18% | | | −10.55% | | | | | | | | | | | | | |
| Joelle | −4.21% | −4.85% | −6.80% | −10.03% | −10.03% | | | | | | | | | | | | | |
| Daniel | −6.61% | −7.27% | −10.57% | −13.22% | | | | | | | | | | | | | | |
| David | −4.07% | | | | | | | | | | | | | | | | | |
| Damien | −4.46% | −6.82% | −7.87% | | | | | | | | | | | | | | | |
| Jerry | −6.78% | −7.05% | | | | | | | | | | | | | | | | |
| Estella | −3.72% | | | | | | | | | | | | | | | | | |

== Elimination voting history ==
| Name | Week | | | | | | | | | | | | | | | | | Finale |
| Name | 1 | 2 | 3 | 4 | 5 | 6 | 7 | 8 | 9 | 10 | 11 | 12 | 13 | 14 | 15 | 16 | 17 | Finale |
| Eliminated | None^{[1]} | Jerry | Damien | Daniel | Carla | Blaine | Shanon | Dane | None^{[2]} | Mandi | Cathy | Aubrey | Nicole | Sione | Laura | Kristin | Filipe | Ron |
| Eliminated | None^{[1]} | Estella | Nicole | David | Joelle | Blaine | Shanon | Dane | None^{[2]} | Mandi | Cathy | Aubrey | Nicole | Sione | Laura | Kristin | Filipe | Ron |
| Helen | Shanon | ? | Joelle | Daniel & David | Carla & Joelle | Dane | X | X | S | X | X | Aubrey | Ron | X | Kristin | X | Filipe | Biggest Loser |
| Mike | X | Jerry | Joelle | X | X | Blaine | Shanon | X | S | X | X | Aubrey | Nicole | X | Laura | Kristin | Filipe | X |
| Tara | Laura | Jerry | Damien | Mike & Ron | Carla & Joelle | Blaine | Shanon | X | S | X | X | Filipe | Nicole | X | Kristin | Kristin | ? | X |
| Ron | X | Jerry | Joelle | X | X | Blaine | Shanon | Dane | S | Mandi | Cathy | Aubrey | X | X | Laura | Helen | X | Eliminated |
| Filipe | Sione | Jerry | Joelle | Daniel & David | Carla & Joelle | Blaine | Shanon | X | S | X | X | X | Ron | X | Laura | Helen | X | Eliminated Week 17 |
| Kristin | Cathy | Jerry | Joelle | Daniel & David | ? | Blaine | Shanon | Dane | S | Mandi | Cathy | Aubrey | Nicole | X | X | X | Eliminated Week 16 | |
| Laura | X | X | | Mike & Ron | Carla & Joelle | Blaine | Shanon | X | S | Cathy | X | Filipe | Nicole | Sione | X | Eliminated Week 15 | | |
| Sione | X | X | | Daniel & David | Carla & Joelle | Blaine | Shanon | X | S | X | X | Aubrey | Ron | X | Eliminated Week 14 | | | |
| Nicole | X | X | Eliminated Week 3, Returned Week 13 | | | | | | | | | | X | Re-eliminated Week 13 | | | | |
| Aubrey | X | X | | Mike & Ron | Carla & Joelle | ? | ? | Kristin | S | Cathy | Cathy | X | Eliminated Week 12 | | | | | |
| Cathy | X | X | | Daniel & David | ? | Blaine | Shanon | Dane | S | Mandi | ? | Eliminated Week 11 | | | | | | |
| Mandi | Aubrey | ? | Damien | Mike & Ron | Carla & Joelle | ? | ? | Ron | S | Ron | Eliminated Week 10 | | | | | | | |
| Dane | X | ? | Damien | Mike & Ron | ? | X | ? | Ron | Eliminated Week 8 | | | | | | | | | |
| Shanon | X | X | | Daniel & David | Carla & Joelle | Dane | X | Eliminated Week 7 | | | | | | | | | | |
| Blaine | X | ? | Damien | Mike & Ron | ? | X | Eliminated Week 6 | | | | | | | | | | | |
| Carla | X | X | | Daniel & David | X | Eliminated Week 5 | | | | | | | | | | | | |
| Joelle | Carla | ? | X | Daniel & David | X | Eliminated Week 5 | | | | | | | | | | | | |
| Daniel | David | X | Damien | X | Eliminated Week 4 | | | | | | | | | | | | | |
| David | X | X | | X | Eliminated Week 4 | | | | | | | | | | | | | |
| Damien | Nicole | Jerry | X | Eliminated Week 3 | | | | | | | | | | | | | | |
| Jerry | Estella | X | Eliminated Week 2 | | | | | | | | | | | | | | | |
| Estella | X | Eliminated Week 2 | | | | | | | | | | | | | | | | |

^[1] No one was eliminated in week 1, but nine teams had to choose one contestant to send home.
^[2] Because the contestants met the goal of 77 pounds, there was no elimination for week 9.

Won immunity (Challenge or Weigh-in)
? Won immunity, vote not revealed because a majority had already been reached
X Won immunity, not allowed to vote
X Below yellow line, not allowed to vote
X Not in elimination, not allowed to vote
X Contestant was sent home with the potential to return after 30 days
? Vote not revealed because a majority had already been reached
S No one was eliminated in this episode (see note above)
Eliminated or not in house
X Below yellow line, America Votes
Last person eliminated before the finale (by America voting)
US$250,000 winner (among the finalists)

== Episode summaries ==
=== Week 1 ===
First aired January 6, 2009

The premiere episode begins with Jillian Michaels and Bob Harper, the show's personal trainers, addressing home viewers by discussing Americans' lazy habits. Their message includes disapproval of unhealthy habits and they attempt to communicate to viewers that the point of the show's weight loss program loses its value if home viewers plan to sit on the couch and eat ice cream while watching. This sets a tone for how the hosts feel about overall physical health. Being that both are physical trainers, they know about healthy activities and eating habits to help contestants.

Eleven new couples then arrive at the Biggest Loser ranch. It's noted that Season 7 features several new records for participants, including the oldest couple, Jerry and Estella (each age 63), the youngest man (Mike, age 18), the heaviest female (Carla, 379 lbs/172 kg), the heaviest male/contestant (Daniel, 454 lbs/206 kg), the tallest contestant (Blaine, 6' 8"), and the most 400+-pound contestants (three) in American Biggest Loser history.^{[a]} The narrators explain that the average age of this new group of contestants is 34 and they also take a total of 45 different medications, making them both the heaviest and least healthy group of contestants to date.

Before meeting trainers Bob and Jillian, the contestants must work out independently. During this time, the trainers watch the contestants on closed-circuit television. During this self-led workout, Jerry passes out and is taken to the hospital. He is later released from the hospital after being told he had a fainting spell caused by a sudden drop in his blood pressure.

Bob and Jillian then choose couples to work with and allow their chosen couples to choose other teammates. Team Purple gets to choose which personal trainer they work with. The final teams are as follows:

- Jillian: White, Black, Green, Orange, and Yellow teams.
- Bob: Silver, Blue, Red, Brown, Pink, and Purple teams.

Hosts reveal that the contestants previously participated in medical testing to gauge their health. In the scene following, each contestant reviews the health outcomes resulting from their obesity with Dr. Robert Huizenga.

Each team participates in the first challenge after speaking with the doctor. The premise of the challenge is running across a bridge, climbing over a large pile of sand placed in the middle, and then back, climbing again over the sand. The first five teams to finish this task move to the second round, where they complete the bridge challenge again. After the second round, the first two finishing couples complete the challenge a third time. The winners of this last race win immunity from elimination at the first weigh-in.

Winners of the second round are the Yellow team, Mandi and Aubrey, and the Black team, Blaine and Dane. In a close finish, the Black Team wins immunity.

The hosts reveal a plot twist: no contestants would be eliminated from the game based on that weigh-in. However, they explained that nine contestants would be sent home in the first week, one from each of the nine teams below the yellow line. The yellow line in The Biggest Loser refers to the leaderboard that displays the percentage of weight lost by all the contestants, and there is a yellow line placed on the board to divide the participants in rank from highest to lowest. The teams above the yellow line were safe from elimination, including Dane and Blaine, who were already safe due to winning the immunity challenge.

At the weigh-in, teams are shown to have lost a total of 382 lbs when calculated together. The most notable losses include a 30 lbs weight loss by Daniel, who began as the heaviest contestant in Biggest Loser history, and a 32 lbs weight loss by Ron, which the host Alison explains puts him in the Biggest Loser record books for most weight loss in the first week.^{[b]}^{[c]} As Jerry was not present at the first weigh-in to determine the contestants' starting weights due to his fainting spell, they weighed him in at the hospital, and his starting weight was announced as 369 lbs.

The Brown team is above the yellow line with 6.6% weight loss, while the Green, White, Blue, Orange, Red, Yellow, Purple, Pink, and Silver teams fall below the yellow line. As a result, each team has to pick one member to send home. Alison presents another plot twist to contestants, even though nine of them are being sent home, the participants sent home have the opportunity to return after 30 days (Week 5) if their partner is still in the game.

After an hour given them to deliberate, the decision was announced. Shanon, Sione, David, Laura, Cathy, Nicole, Estella, Aubrey, and Carla are sent home for at least the next 30 days.

=== Week 2 ===
First aired January 13, 2009

The episode begins with a challenge of temptation. The contestants are asked to stand behind a white line. Alison explains that the first contestant to cross the line will receive $5,000, but that contestant will also be eliminated from the competition. No one crosses the line, and the prize is increased to $10,000 and again to $25,000. None of the contestants accept the offer. Joelle is the only one who admits she was tempted.

Throughout the episode, video clips are shown of the at-home contestants and their progress. Some are well-motivated and working hard, while others are having difficulties, and beginning to succumb to old unhealthy habits.

For this week's challenge, the contestants are taken to the ocean for a "kayak and foot" race. The objective is to kayak for a quarter mile and then climb to the top of a "mountain" near the beach. The winner of the race wins immunity at the weigh-in and the top four finishers win a phone call home. The contestant finishing in last place will receive a one pound-penalty at the weigh-in. Tara wins immunity, with Blaine coming in second, Mandi in third, and Helen in fourth. All four are rewarded with phone calls. Mike, Damien, Kristin, Joelle, Filipe, and Jerry are the next six to finish, with Dan finishing last. Tara gives her phone call to Filipe because she says it would mean more to someone with a wife and kids at home.

A large portion of this week's episode is focused on the problems of Joelle, who appears to lack motivation and is not putting forth sufficient effort. At the "last chance work-out," Bob becomes frustrated with her as she keeps stopping during 30-second sprints, and he begins to raise his voice with her a little over time. Jillian states that she has never seen Bob get this mad.

At the weigh-in, Tara loses one pound, but since she won the challenge, she was safe from elimination. The Black team (Blaine & Dane) has the largest percentage of weight loss, while Jerry and Dan both fall below the yellow line. The one-pound penalty Dan earned at the challenge is critical because, without the penalty, it would have been Joelle up for elimination instead. The other members of Bob's team had stated that had Joelle fallen below the yellow line, they would vote her out.

The contestants are given an hour to deliberate together. They find it difficult to choose between Jerry and Dan, saying they feel both really need to be at the Ranch. Ultimately they agree that Dan needs it more, as he is a young man who has had a serious problem all his life and has never been thin, while Jerry has the support of his wife at home and was once at a healthy weight. They feel Jerry has a better chance in the long run of losing weight and keeping it off than Dan will if he went home this early in the game. After deliberation, the contestants unanimously vote to send Jerry home, which eliminates both Jerry and Estella.

At home, Jerry has seen dramatic improvements in his health and energy levels; he no longer suffers from the symptoms of diabetes. He has lost 84 pounds and hopes to lose at least 160 by the finale. Estella is under 200 pounds.

=== Week 3 ===
First aired January 20, 2009

Emotions are running high after the elimination of Jerry and the White Team. The contestants still believe that Joelle does not deserve to be there, with animosity against her growing.

In the temptation challenge, each contestant is put in a room with piles of tempting foods for five minutes. Their at-home partners each face a similar temptation. The team that consumes the most calories wins a visit home for the partner on the ranch, with the team's trainer making the trip as well. Mandi eats one slice of pizza (380 calories). Sione (blue, at home) eats two slices of pizza and one taco (960 calories total) because he wants to see his trainer again. Carla (silver, at home) eats three slices of pizza, five chicken nuggets, one taco, and two cupcakes, for a total of 2710 calories, winning the challenge. None of the other players are shown consuming any food. The Orange team does not participate in the temptation. While the reason is not mentioned in the episode, it was indicated later that Dan was off campus for additional medical testing at the time.

Joelle appears to be excited at the prospect of going home and getting away from the ranch. Joelle and Bob visit Carla in Southfield, Michigan (a suburb of Detroit), who states that her weight is now down to 335 lbs. When Carla learns that Joelle has been consistently near the yellow line, she screams and rants at her at length, while a shocked Bob looks on.

Several team members visit Dr. Huizenga. Blaine was once taking eight different medications per day, for diabetes, cholesterol, and depression, but now no longer needs any of them. Ron was once taking ten pills per day plus insulin, but he is now down to only one with a reduced level of insulin. Dr. Huizenga informs them that this reduction in medication will save Blaine a projected $733,000 over his lifetime, and Ron over $20,000 per year.

Joelle and Bob return to the ranch and the contestants face a challenge from seasons past: each person must jump over a Styrofoam bar, part of a giant metal jump rope. If they break the Styrofoam, they are out. Joelle, Ron, Daniel, and Helen are out on the first few swings, either mistiming the jump or not being able to jump at all. Damien (57 swings), Filipe (105), Mandi (141), and Dane (701) fare much better. In the end, it comes down to Kristin and Tara, who make it to 1030 jumps (two hours 19 minutes) in 95-degree heat. Ultimately, Kristin succumbs to the heat, giving Tara immunity for the second week in a row.

At the weigh-in, the Black team has the highest percentage of weight loss, while Joelle and Damien (both of whom are being trained by Bob), fall below the yellow line. Bob's team gives Joelle and Damien the opportunity to plead their case, and Tara asks Joelle if she wants to be on the Ranch. Joelle equivocates in her answer. Bob's team makes the unanimous decision to send Joelle home. Jillian's team indicates that they will "respect Bob's team's decision." However, at the vote, Jillian's team votes unanimously for Damien, causing a tie. The rules state that in case of a tie, the person with the least weight loss goes home, and that means Damien is out.

At home, Nicole has lost 76 pounds and plans to wear a size 8 dress at the couple's June wedding. Damien has lost 74 pounds and hopes to lose 126 before the finale.

=== Week 4 ===
First aired January 27, 2009

Tensions between Bob's and Jillian's teams are high as Bob's team reacts with anger towards Jillian's team blindsiding them at the previous vote. Jillian's team said they would vote out Joelle, but voted for Damien instead. Jillian's team members explain privately that Joelle will cause the most disruption and weaken Bob's team, while Bob's team is aghast that now Joelle thinks that all of her teammates want her gone.

This week is Super Bowl week and the challenges are related to football. The teams face a reward challenge to guess how many calories are in some football-related snacks. Daniel, Kristin, and Helen are the winners of the first round, and chef Curtis Stone shows them how to make a low-calorie substitute for Buffalo wings. In the second round, the winners of the first round must guess the number of calories in the low-calorie substitute. Daniel of the Orange team wins, and as a reward, receives a two-pound pass for his at-home teammate, David, and David receives an at-home visit for a day from the chef, who shows him how to cook healthy meals.

In the gym, Jillian focuses her attention on Daniel, who achieves beyond what he thought he could do. He confesses he has never been thin and doesn't think it is possible for him ever to be thin. Bob has renewed hope for Joelle, who seems to have had her "fire lit" after the previous week's vote, and begins to work out harder.

For the immunity challenge, the contestants must run back and forth on a football field to retrieve footballs to place in another contestant's bin. When a contestant's bin has five footballs in it, that contestant is eliminated from the challenge. As a strategy, the contestants start by targeting the "strong players" on the opposite training team, before targeting fellow training team members. Filipe is eliminated first, followed by Tara, Dane, Kristin, Mandi, Daniel, Mike, and Joelle. The winner is Helen of the Pink team, who is elated that at her age she was able to win such a physical challenge. NFL quarterback Kurt Warner co-hosts the challenge to help inspire the teams.

At the weigh-in, the at-home players are brought back to the ranch, reuniting with their partners. The contestants are told that the at-home players will weigh in the next day, but only if their team is not eliminated in the vote following that day's weigh-in. Tara wins the weigh-in after losing twelve pounds. Helen, who has immunity, has the second lowest percentage of weight loss. The Brown team (Ron and Mike) and the Orange team (Daniel) both fall below the yellow line. Both Ron and Mike blame themselves for not losing more weight, while Ron pleads for the other contestants to save his son. Daniel (Orange team) pleads for the right to stay on the ranch, while his partner, David, says his heart really isn't in it and he is not sure he wants to be there. The vote is nearly evenly split, with Jillian's trainees voting to send the Brown team home (trained by Bob), and Bob's trainees voting to send the Orange team home (trained by Jillian). The Orange Team is eliminated, by a vote of four to three.

At home, Daniel can now run for over 19 minutes and no longer needs to take medication for diabetes, while David has reportedly quit smoking. David has lost 48 pounds and hopes to "shock America" at the finale. Daniel has lost 101 pounds and hopes to break a 'Biggest Loser' record for the largest total weight loss.

=== Week 5 ===
First aired February 3, 2009

The episode begins with the at-home players weighing in. The winner of the weigh-in wins immunity for his/her team at the weigh-in at the end of the week. Sione is the winner, having lost 25 pounds (7.16%) over the past 30 days. Shanon lost 15 pounds, Cathy lost 8, Laura lost 7, and Carla lost 20. In last place is Aubrey, who lost 2 pounds.

At the challenge, each team is tied to the end of a long rope that is wrapped around a pipe. The contestants must work together to unwrap enough rope in order to make it 300 feet (91 m) to the finish line. Each team must keep their rope untangled as it is being unwound, as well as estimate its length while climbing over and under the pipe repeatedly. Aubrey and Mandi (Yellow team) win the challenge, just beating Sione and Filipe, and are given the choice between a $5,000 prize or a two-pound advantage at the weigh-in.

The reunited teams later work out together. Filipe is shocked that Sione is able to work out even faster than him, despite having been off the ranch. Carla is frustrated that Joelle is slacking off in the gym, a fact that annoys a number of other contestants as well. Shanon often complains and cries, but displays strong exercise skills.

At the weigh-in, the Yellow team reveals they have elected to take the two-pound advantage. The Green team (Tara and Laura) has the highest percentage of weight loss for the second week in a row, losing 4.84% and 25 pounds, while the Brown and Silver teams fall below the yellow line. Carla becomes angry because she lost nine pounds while her partner, Joelle, lost nothing. In addition, Joelle went home to Southfield in order to vote in the presidential election during the past week of training, which angered Carla and others. Several of the other contestants are upset to see Carla below the yellow line because they feel it is due to Joelle's poor performance.

During the deliberations, Aubrey asks Joelle if she honestly wants to be at the ranch. Joelle equivocates and never directly replies to the question. Carla's anger at Joelle escalates into an argument. The Brown team says that they need to be there for Mike's sake. As the votes are revealed, the first four votes are all for the Silver team, which is enough to send them home, and it is not necessary to reveal the votes from the remaining two teams. As each team casts its vote, they make clear that they want Joelle off the ranch, but that they will miss Carla, who they feel worked out very hard.

In the at-home update, it is revealed that Carla and Joelle have not spoken to each other for several months. When they finally meet they get into another argument; Joelle tells Carla she is done and walks out. The final video shows them separately. Joelle has lost 57 pounds and is planning to wear a size 10 dress at the finale. Carla has lost 87 pounds and hopes to break the record for weight loss by a female contestant.

=== Week 6 ===
First aired February 10, 2009

The contestants on the ranch are subject to the first ever "Pop Challenge." They are all, without warning, summoned to the pool, where they must each stand on a block, on one foot. The person who stands the longest wins a 24-hour visit from a "loved one." Mandi of the yellow team wins after she convinces Blaine, Filipe, and Aubrey to quit because of her great need to see her husband. It is revealed that her husband was not supportive of her trip to the ranch, seeing it as time taken away from her duties to her family. Jillian sees it as an unspoken pact between the spouses—she will gain weight and he will still love her and in exchange, she'll never leave him. Losing weight, therefore, is a breaking of the pact and an implicit threat to the marriage. Jillian cautions Mandi to maintain her strength and keep her eyes on the goal. Her husband arrives and, as an extra treat, her two young sons come to the ranch, too. She shows them all what she has been doing, and gives them a taste of her workouts and her food. As Jillian feared, she does sacrifice some workout time to spend with her family. However, her husband grudgingly says he will be supportive of her goal. Aubrey cries because it's hard to see her sister with her family, while she is apart from her own husband and five children.

Meanwhile, Bob is disappointed and concerned for Mike due to his lack of significant weight loss. He puts him on a higher-calorie diet as he believes Mike's low consumption is causing his metabolism to slow down. The immunity challenge involves each team holding a bar above their heads, together, for as long as they can. A red light indicates that the team is out. Some of the strongest teams (Black, Brown, and Blue) end up failing early on, and the challenge comes down to four women's teams—Pink, Green, Yellow, and Purple. Eventually, it is just Purple and Green, who last for over four and a half hours together. Purple is determined to win, as Kristin lost to Tara on a previous challenge. Laura eventually fails, and Purple wins immunity.

At the weigh-in, Laura, who was criticized by Jillian for not doing the work, loses only 3 pounds. Mike, after his increase in food consumption, also increases his loss to 13 pounds. Mandi manages to lose 6 pounds despite her family's presence, but Aubrey loses only 1 pound. Black falls below the yellow line for the first time, as their weekly double-digit results falter. This week, only one team falls below the line, with contestants having to choose one in the team to go home. As Bob says goodbye to his team, he whispers to each of them "Dane and no one else." Blaine asks the other contestants to vote to send him home, as he wants to be with his new baby. He also is getting closer to goal weight, and therefore will likely derive less benefit from remaining on the ranch. Bob's team is tempted to vote Dane off, as he is the bigger threat—he has more weight to lose, he is a key support person for the rest of Jillian's team, and it's what Bob wants. There is also bitterness on Bob's team because several weeks earlier, Jillian's team voted off Damien instead of Joelle, despite Bob's team's request to vote off Joelle. In the end, while the Pink team votes for Dane, all of the other couples on Bob's team vote for Blaine (Blue, Brown, and Purple), and Blaine goes home. At home, he is doing well and is training for an Ironman Triathlon. He has lost 86 pounds so far.

=== Week 7 ===
First aired February 17, 2009

The contestants are faced with a second Pop Challenge. Alison meets them in front of the gym and tells them that only two teams will have access to the gym for the entire week. The contestants must run up a hill to a board with 130 keys on it, pick a key, and run back down and check if the key fits one of the two locks attached to the gym doors. Shanon finds the first key on her sixth attempt, while Mike finds the second on his ninth attempt. As a result, the Pink and Brown Teams will have the gym to themselves for the week, and the other teams must work out without using the gym.

Bob and Jillian are reunited with their teams. When Jillian sees that Dane is there, she is surprised. She thought the others would get rid of Dane because of how big of a threat he is. She and her team mention how they overheard Bob telling his team to get rid of Dane. Jillian says Bob hates it when his team disobeys him, and when Bob talks to his team and realizes that they didn't listen to him, he is indeed upset. But he quickly became happy again once he heard about the POP Challenge, and that Helen and Shanon, and Mike and Ron had the keys to the gym. Jillian was ticked off because she "is not an outdoorsy girl".

Jillian uses the living room for her team to train, and Bob takes the Purple and Blue Teams outside to the "prison yard" to work out with lawn furniture. Sione comments that even though they don't have the gym equipment it's just another day of torture from Bob. Meanwhile, Helen and Shanon are turning Jillian's side of the gym into a lounge, and when Bob comes to check on them, he thinks it's hilarious, but he reminds them that this isn't the time to slack off. Tara is giving Jillian trouble, not wanting to work out due to "stress and missing Blaine." Jillian refuses to let her stop.

At the immunity challenge, each contestant must operate a rowing machine that is attached to a tower of lights. If the light is green, the contestant is growing fast enough. If the light turns yellow, it is a warning to increase the speed. If a contestant's light turns red, all members of that contestant's team are eliminated from the challenge. After twenty minutes of rowing, only the Black and Green teams are still in the competition. Ultimately, Dane wins the challenge, after Laura's light turns red, and Dane is awarded immunity at this week's weigh-in.

At the weigh-in, Dane loses four pounds, but he has immunity, so he is safe from elimination. The Green team (Laura and Tara) has the highest percentage of weight loss (3.14%), while the Pink team is below the yellow line. After some deliberation, Helen tells the other contestants that the Pink team has decided that they would like to send Shanon home. Aubrey asks if Shanon wants to leave because it's what she wants, or because it's what her mom wants. Shanon says she knows she can do it at home and thinks her mom needs this more than she does. At the elimination, the contestants honor the Pink team's request to send Shanon home.

At home, Shanon's weight is down to 198 pounds, and she has dropped 10 pant sizes. She is pursuing one of her lifelong dreams by training to compete in roller derby. Her derby name is "Flower Power."

=== Week 8 ===
First aired February 24, 2009 (first hour) and February 25, 2009 (second hour) due to the Presidential Address on February 24 at 9:00 pm

The contestants are brought to the third pop challenge; Alison explains that this challenge will change the course of the game. The two-person teams are being dissolved and the game is becoming Black vs. Blue.

For the pop challenge, one player from each team must complete 100 "up-downs" (a "classic" football drill) in the mud. To complete an up-down, the contestant must first lay down flat in the mud, then jump up and hit a disk above his/her head. The contestant to complete 100 up-downs wins the challenge (along with their teammate) and keeps their trainer. The team coming in last place is forced to switch trainers (or the team will automatically be split up). The remaining teams are placed on teams at random, as determined by flipping a coin, under the condition that no trainer can have more than six contestants. Tara wins the challenge, and she and Laura elect to keep Jillian as their trainer, joining the Black Team. Helen comes in last place and is forced to switch from Bob to Jillian.

At the end of the selection process, the new teams are as follows:

- Blue: Ron (Brown), Cathy & Kristin (Purple), Aubrey & Mandi (Yellow), and Dane (Black).
- Black: Tara & Laura (Green), Filipe & Sione (Blue), Mike (Brown), and Helen (Pink).

When the trainers find out about the new team set-ups, they are both surprised. Both Bob and Jillian are concerned about the effect this will have on the contestants. Bob is upset about losing Filipe, Sione, Helen, and Mike, and becomes emotional while talking to his former team.

The regular weekly challenge is a biking challenge. The new teams are taken into the gym where they find two bikes, one for each team. Alison explains that the objective of the challenge is to put on as many miles on the bike as possible in 24 hours. Teams can switch out players at any time and the team with the miles-riddenidden wins. At the end of the challenge, the scores stand at 301.9 to 264 miles (425 km), and the Black Team wins. Each member of the Black team is awarded a custom Trek bike for each member, and the team earns a 3-pound advantage at the upcoming weigh-in. Tara rode the farthest of all the contestants; nearly 59 miles (95 km).

At the weigh-in, the Black Team has the highest percentage of weight loss (3.65% with the 3-pound advantage). Dane loses 13 pounds, for a total of 100 pounds in eight weeks, which is announced as a new record for the show. Cathy, who loses 14 pounds, is the biggest loser on the Blue team and is granted immunity. At the vote, Ron, Cathy and Kristin vote for Dane, while Dane and Mandi vote for Ron, and Aubrey votes for Kristin; eliminating Dane.

At home, it is reported that Dane trained for and ultimately ran a 42.195-kilometre (26.219 mi) marathon with his wife, finishing in 3 hours and 53 minutes. This claim was later retracted, and an apology was issued by NBC.

=== Week 9 ===
First aired March 3, 2009

Rocco DiSpirito visits the ranch and teaches the contestants something about cooking unhealthy foods (cheeseburgers, pizza, and burritos) in a healthier manner. The teams compete to cook those three foods, with the winner being the team that cooks the best-tasting food that is the lowest in calories, all in 30 minutes. The Black team wins, meaning that they get to have a dinner prepared by Rocco (with the losing team having to wash the dishes), and one member of the team gets to have an extra vote. At dinner, Rocco makes panko-breaded chicken and mashed sweet potatoes. When the Blue team arrives to wash the dishes, the two teams end up having a water fight.

Jillian takes Sione aside to talk to: she senses that he and Filipe are not happy about the switch in trainers, so Jillian gives him a pep talk, then takes him for some one-on-one training. During the training, Sione sprains his ankle. Meanwhile, the Blue team is taken to a boxing gym to train with surprise guest Sugar Ray Leonard. Aubrey is excited since she boxed for three years.

Dr. H comes by to talk to the contestants, and singles out Tara and Mike as two people who have broken records at the ranch for weight loss and muscle growth. The teams are then assembled for a challenge: they have to pack kits at the LA Food Bank, with each kit designated for a family, and the team that packs 150 kits first, wins. The winners get letters from home and each member of the team gets one year of free groceries. The Black team has to sit out one member, and they choose Laura. The Black Team wins, and Aubrey is upset, because she has five children, and she confesses to the camera that when she had her first two kids, she was unmarried and had to go to a food bank in order to feed her children. The next day, Mike (from the Black team) offers Aubrey (from the Blue team) his year of free groceries, since she needs them more. She accepts and tells everyone else about it, and the contestants all share an emotional moment.

Jillian is angered to hear that Laura sat out of the competition, despite the fact that Sione was injured and Helen was older and not as strong. She singles out Laura as someone who is not working to her potential. Jillian asks each team member who is the weakest link, and all in turn (except Tara) say that it is Laura. Jillian says this is the meanest thing she has ever done, but she is desperate to get through to Laura, who she feels has put herself in the role of victim when she's actually a strong woman. Laura runs away crying, but later she and Jillian talk a bit.

At the weigh-in, the contestants are informed that there's a twist: if the 11 contestants lose an average of a pound a day each, then no one will go home. But if they collectively fall below that goal, then one person from each team will go home. They weigh in, but as Mike weighs in, they flash "to be continued...", leaving the last portion of the weigh-in to week 10.

=== Week 10 ===
First aired March 10, 2009

Mike's weigh-in from week 9 is revealed to be 11 pounds. Because the contestants have lost more than 77 pounds combined, they all are safe and no one is eliminated for week 9. However, because there is no elimination, Week 10 begins immediately. As a twist for the week, elimination will be based on contests between two individuals, one from each team. Whoever has the higher percentage of weight loss will get one point for their team and the first team to reach three points will be safe from elimination. There is a pop challenge: contestants have a wall-sit while balancing a medicine ball on their laps – the winner will decide the matchups. Tara wins the challenge and therefore is allowed to choose the match-ups for the upcoming elimination. Because the Black Team has one more member, one person from the team will not have a match-up. Tara's choices are Mike vs. Cathy, Sione vs. Mandi, Filipe vs. Kristin, Helen vs. Ron, and Laura vs. Aubrey, with herself being exempt from any face-off.

Shortly thereafter, they have a reward challenge – a relay race with 24 medicine balls at a 24 Hour Fitness. The Black Team wins and receives the prize of "24 hours of luxury" at a spa in Southern California. While there, the team eats over 15,000 calories total, and many of them drink and smoke as well. Meanwhile, the Blue Team works out and eats a healthy, low-calorie dinner. The next morning, the Black team isn't feeling well and is sluggish from the fatty foods and alcohol they had consumed. When they get back to the ranch, Helen says they should conceal from Jillian their gorging. But Jillian has already been informed of the events via crew members and reams out the team for their irresponsibility. Filipe gets angry and has an emotional confrontation with Jillian, in which he complains that the real problem is that she won't work with him and he feels rejected. He storms out and Sione follows. They approach Bob and tell them about their confrontation, and ask him to train them; Bob agrees. At the weigh-in, many of the Black Team are shocked at their poor performance – Filipe loses only one pound, and Tara did not lose anything, with Laura gaining 1 pound. But the Black team wins the weigh-in 3–2. The three original Bob team members who are on the Blue Team – Cathy, Kristin, and Ron – have been voting as a bloc, and they decide to vote off Mandi, a former Jillian team member because their only other option is her sister Aubrey, but they feel Aubrey needs the ranch more than Mandi, who gained two pounds at the weigh-in. Laura still has an extra vote that she won the previous week, so she and Mandi and Aubrey decide to vote for Cathy, which will cause a tie and force the Black Team to decide whom to vote off. The Black Team has decided to vote off Aubrey, as she is a bigger threat than Mandi, and also, since the former Bob Team members of the Black Team are sticking together, they don't have the votes to vote off Cathy or Ron.

At the elimination, Mandi gets three votes as expected and Laura and Aubrey vote for Cathy, as promised. However, Mandi, in an emotional twist, decides she can't vote her sister off because her sister needs this more, despite her sister's assurance that she would be fine with being voted off, so Mandi instead votes for Ron, ensuring that she herself would go home.

At home, Mandi is now ready to help with her husband Rusty and her two sons. She has lost a total of 84 pounds and plans to be a size 2 at the season finale.

=== Week 11 ===
First aired March 17, 2009

All of the contestants are sent home for a week and they are shown with their families. Aubrey is seen trying to juggle her workout schedule with the responsibilities of raising five children. Later, she is shown trying to convince her father, who weighs approximately 500 pounds, to take control of his health and lose 300 pounds. Ron and Mike are greeted at home by their family, with an emotional greeting between Mike and his 16-year-old brother, who is heavier than Mike was at the start of the season. It is difficult, he explains, to now be the heaviest person in the family. While at home, contestants are each given a tin of 13 sugar cookies, and also given a challenge: to run a half-marathon of 21.0975 kilometres (13.1094 mi). The victor will receive $10,000. For each sugar cookie eaten, the contestant can add 5 minutes to the race time of any competitor they choose. All contestants except Ron complete their race (performed near their homes, with officials observing, so only one or two contestants race together, so none have knowledge of the race times of the others). Tara completes the race in the fastest time (2:24:19), with Sione finishing in a close second (2:25:57). Ron walks four miles (6 km) in under two hours. When the contestants return to the ranch, they discover that Helen ate one cookie and elected to add a five-minute penalty to Tara's time, thus Sione wins the challenge.

At the weigh-in, Tara and Kristin are close to losing 100 pounds for the season, which would represent the first time a woman has lost that amount while at the ranch. Though close, neither breaks that mark; Tara loses 2 pounds while Kristin gains 1 pound. Tara is particularly upset, given that she lost nothing the previous week. Jillian explains that Tara is overdoing it, and needs to listen to Jillian's advice to sleep and rest more. Mike is happy when it is revealed that his father, Ron, has lost 10 pounds, which puts his total loss at 103 pounds. Ultimately, the Black Team wins the weigh-in, and Ron has immunity. The Blue Team must decide between voting for Aubrey, Cathy, or Kristin. Cathy volunteers to be eliminated and the other team members follow her decision; she is sent home.

At home, Cathy reports she is down to 215 pounds and has inspired her other two daughters to lose weight as well. The three have lost a combined total of 141 pounds and hope to lose 205 pounds by the Finale.

=== Week 12 ===
First aired March 24, 2009

After the elimination, the Black team is shocked to see Aubrey still on the ranch and Cathy gone. Aubrey admits that Cathy volunteered to go home so Aubrey could stay. Kristin is struggling with not having her mom there and Tara gives her a hug.

The next day, Ali tells the players that they will now play as individuals, with their original colors restored to them (as opposed to the past couple of seasons where contestants kept their blue and black shirts and contestants maintained the Blue Vs. Black competition, a format change that would recur in later couples/pairs seasons)—is a change that pleases all of the players. Mike has lost the most weight on the ranch and Ali holds up his original Brown shirt, which several people can now fit into at once. Ali also tells the players they can choose their own trainers.

Bob and Jillian arrive to hear the contestant's decisions. Jillian thinks it is a cruel scenario, akin to choosing between your mother and your father. Sione, Filipe, Ron, Kristin and Aubrey choose Bob, while Helen, Laura, Tara, and Mike (who in the end flipped a coin to decide who to train with) choose Jillian. The players all hit the gym to train with their chosen trainers. Kristin becomes frustrated at Bob's intense focus on Sione and Filipe, and the two have a talk in which she explains that she needs him a lot if she is to reach her goal of being the first woman to lose 100 pounds on the ranch. Bob dedicates himself to her.

The players meet Ali outside for a challenge: each is given blocks that represent the amount of weight they have lost and are able to distribute that weight to any of the other players, with the totals to be used later for their next, unknown challenge. Most of the other players pile their weights onto Tara, meaning that she ends up with 257 pounds of extra weight. Tara becomes upset, while the other players laugh and tell her it's all in fun. Tara walks away in tears, and Aubrey tries to comfort her, but Tara brushes her off. Later, Laura speaks with her, and Tara tells her she never wants to do the challenge and leave the ranch. Laura talks her out of it, and Tara emerges more determined than ever to defeat the others to show them she can win despite their opposition. Helen also had a lot of weight piled on her and ended up with 215 pounds; Ron says that she "left the fold" (by choosing Jillian), and needs to be warned as a result. Helen takes it as a compliment to the level of threat she poses.

The next challenge begins: the contestants are taken to a NASCAR track with broken-down cars each painted in the players' colors. NASCAR champion Clint Bowyer shows up to tell them about the second part of the challenge. The players will each pull their assigned car for half a mile, with the weight from the previous activity added to their car. Everyone except for Kristin and Laura participated. Initially, Sione takes the lead, followed by Mike. Tara falls behind. Yet as the race goes on, she gradually gains on the others and eventually wins, despite the extra pounds. Her reward is immunity, a ride around the track in a racecar, and a trip to a NASCAR event. Tara joyfully shares news of her upset victory with Jillian.

At the weigh-in, Tara needs to lose four pounds to become the first woman to lose 100 pounds on the ranch. She falls just shy, at three pounds. Kristin, who needs to lose three pounds to reach her goal of 100, is then weighed in. She loses eight pounds, making her the first woman to lose a hundred pounds on the ranch. All the players give her a wild round of applause. Ron loses ten pounds, and worries because Mike is second to last in weight loss for the week, meaning that Ron pushes his son closer to the yellow line. Ultimately, Aubrey and Filipe find themselves below the yellow line. At the vote, the players vote along original team lines, with all of the original Bob Team members voting for Aubrey, and only Tara and Laura voting for Filipe. Aubrey goes home. At home, Aubrey does not go regularly to the gym because of family demands and gains back nine pounds in her first three weeks back home. She later loses the nine pounds that she gained plus another additional ten.

=== Week 13 ===
First aired March 31, 2009

Due to Alison Sweeney giving birth just after the previous week's elimination, Ali Vincent, the Season 5 winner, shares hosting duties with Michelle Aguilar, Season 6 winner. As the episode begins, the three players whose on-campus partners were eliminated in the first few weeks of the season return for a chance to rejoin the ranch. The players are Estella (White Team), Nicole (Red Team), and David (Orange Team), and the person with the highest percentage of weight loss will return and have immunity for the week. Estella loses 45 pounds or 18.59%. David loses 46 pounds or 11.70%. Nicole loses 87 pounds or 32.34%. Nicole is thus the winner, and in fact, has lost a higher percentage of weight than anybody on the ranch with the exception of Tara. Nicole begins training with Bob, while all of the players try to win her over to their side.

Meanwhile, Ron experiences chest pains, dizziness and nausea, and is sent to the hospital. Dr. Huizenga explains that Ron is bleeding internally, but a heart attack is ruled out. Tests show that he has two bleeding ulcers. The problem is fixed, and Ron is also treated with bloat-inducing red blood cells and fluids and released.

Bob is shown focusing his attention on Sione and Kristin, his most promising trainees; he emphasizes to them that they must never quit. The challenge this week, moderated by Michelle Aguilar, involves contestants balancing on a platform above a swimming pool, with each platform supported by 40 ropes. The ropes are cut one by one, with the last person still balancing on their platform as the winner. The prize is a one-pound advantage at weigh-in. Nicole, who has immunity, will instead win a one-pound penalty for the person of her choice. Sione, inspired by Bob, wins.

Alison Sweeney returns for the weigh-in. To everyone's shock, Nicole has gained five pounds, and because of this, she loses her immunity. The rule, already in place on the Australian Biggest Loser, is that if a person with immunity gains weight, they will lose it.

Mike is the Biggest Loser for the week, Tara becomes the second woman to lose 100 pounds on the ranch, and Ron and Nicole, both of whom gained weight, are up for elimination (Laura also gained weight, but it was not enough to place her below the yellow line). During deliberations, Filipe and Mike have a confrontation over the previous week's elimination, in which Ron had argued for voting off Filipe instead of Aubrey, which Filipe sees as a violation of their alliance. Thus, Filipe, Sione, and Helen vote for Ron, but Tara, Laura, Kristin, and Mike vote for Nicole, eliminating her for a second time from the game.

In the video update, Nicole is shown trying on a size 12 wedding dress (a contrast to her previous size 24 dress). She has lost 105 pounds and hopes to fit in a size 8 wedding dress for her wedding in June.

=== Week 14 ===
First aired April 7, 2009

Drama is at a high peak as Ron returns from the elimination. Helen, Filipe and Sione all realize Ron is going to be out to get them now that he knows they wanted him gone. Ron calls out Filipe for telling him he was "fine" before the voting. Mike is also upset about his dad getting betrayed.

The next day, Ali is waiting in the gym filled with silver platters everywhere for a temptation challenge. The 100 trays are hiding fattening snacks, some healthy Extra gum with cash, and one lucky golden ticket that will give the player who uncovers it the power to cast the sole vote at the elimination. As each player tries to get the lucky platter, they rack up the calories, Kristin only eating one or two food items before realizing that that's how she'll gain weight and possibly put herself below the yellow line. Tara consumes more than 4600 calories before the ticket is found. Eventually, Laura finds the golden ticket, and she and Tara scream with excitement as they realize they'll be safe for another week. The trainers walk into the gym as the contestants are cleaning up the remnants of their temptation. Neither is pleased; Bob and Jillian pledge to train together to "kick their asses and beat the crap out of them." Everyone but Laura regrets how much they consumed, while Sione tries to rationalize his mistakes as a fight for power. Although upset, Bob comments that once the contestants told him how the previous night's voting proceeded, he understands why everyone wanted the ticket.

Jillian takes her team to Subway for a healthy meal. Last season's father/daughter duo Coleen and Jerry walk in, and they teach the contestants how to make a healthy sandwich. Jillian gives some tips, like using mustard and vinegar instead of oil and mayonnaise, apples instead of fries and iced tea instead of soda. Everyone realizes that adjustments like these will help them keep a healthy lifestyle once they leave the ranch.

This week's challenge is at the Rose Bowl stadium. Their task is to run the stairs – all 2,156 of them. The first half of the competition is men versus women, a "Battle of the sexes," with the winner of each gender competing in a second leg. The winner of the second leg receives a two-week trip for four to a fitness spa in Utah. Sione and Tara win the first leg and face off against each other in the second leg. Although most of the race is close, Tara edges out Sione for victory.

Back at the house, the scheming begins. Sione and Filipe become angry when Kristin doesn't say she would vote Ron out if she had the chance. Helen suggests Laura vote off her own partner, Tara, because they're not family. Kristin suggests that Tara may fall below the yellow line on purpose, knowing her partner Laura wouldn't vote her off. Before the weigh-in, Kristin brings Laura breakfast in bed, hoping that it might save her if she was to fall below the yellow line.

At the weigh-in, it is announced that Mike is nine pounds away from breaking the all-time record for weight loss at the ranch,^{[d]} but he does not break the record, only losing five pounds. The contestants are shocked to see that Tara only lost three pounds, and she tries to reason with Jillian that she didn't try to throw the weigh-in on purpose. Ultimately, Helen and Sione fall below the yellow line, and it is up to Laura to cast the deciding vote. She ultimately decides to send Sione home.

At home, Sione has lost a total of 137 pounds, and he has also decided to switch careers from landscaping to being a personal trainer.

=== Week 15 ===
First aired April 14, 2009

The episode begins with the aftermath of Sione's elimination. Filipe is upset, and Kristin comforts him while he reads her a letter that Sione left him. He vows to fight harder to honor Sione.

The next day, the contestants walk up to a canyon for their next challenge. Using only cables and a zipline, they must traverse a 700-foot-wide (210 m) canyon that has a 110-foot (34 m) drop. They are competing for a $25,000 kitchen makeover and restocking of their refrigerator. Filipe takes an early lead. Ron goes 40 feet (12 m) and feels that his knee can't take it and the risk isn't worth it. Mike is terrified because of a lifelong fear of heights, but he completes the challenge. Tara loses her footing and spends more than a minute trying to get back on the line, but she picks up speed and takes the lead from Filipe with less than 100 feet (30 m) left and wins. After the challenge, Alison tells them that it is makeover week. They are all excited.

The contestants go to Macy's where they are greeted by Tim Gunn from Project Runway, and he assists them in picking out new outfits. Each person receives a $1,000 gift card to buy a new wardrobe from Macy's. He informs them that they are preparing to go to a Hollywood movie premiere. Afterwards, everyone goes to Warren-Tricomi salon to get new hairstyles. At the premiere, each contestant has a surprise visitor waiting for them. Filipe's wife, Helen's husband, Kristin's husband, Laura's best friend, Mike's brother/Ron's son, Ron's wife/Mike's mother, and Tara's mother have all come to surprise the contestants. The movie at the premiere turns out to be a movie about their journey on the show, bringing forth many emotions from both the contestants and their loved ones. Emotions ran wild on this day of the show.

Because of the makeovers that week, everyone lacks the workout time they usually have in other weeks. Bob and Jillian both plan to make the last-chance workouts brutal to make up for the lost time. Laura has been experiencing severe and persistent pains in her hip, leading Jillian to take her to see Dr. H. He informs them that Laura has a stress fracture in her hip and that it is the worst injury they've ever had on the show. Laura is instructed to be careful and limit her activity because if she gets a full fracture, she will need surgery.

At the weigh-in, Mike knows that he is just 5 pounds away from breaking the record for most weight lost on the ranch, so he is nervous. He loses five pounds to set a new ranch record. Ron is ecstatic when he loses 6 pounds despite not working out as much, and Helen is shocked to lose 7 pounds. Kristin loses 2 pounds. Laura is the last to weigh in and is nervous because she knows that her injury has kept her from doing anything during the week; she gained 3 pounds. Jillian is devastated for her because she was finally starting to realize her strength and come into her own. Kristin and Laura are below the yellow line and up for elimination.

Tara pleads for Laura to stay, but Ron argues that if Laura stays on the ranch, she is not going to get the help she needs to take care of her hip. He says he knows what it's like because of his own hip issues. Filipe poses the question that what if they eliminated Kristin because she's the bigger threat and then something worse happened to Laura's hip. They all feel that if she stays, Laura may not take the precautions necessary to protect herself, and possibly further worsen her injuries. Helen and Tara vote to eliminate Kristin, while Mike, Ron, and Filipe vote for Laura, thus eliminating Laura from The Biggest Loser. It was edited her dismissed with the "you are not the biggest loser" phrase that Alison usually states whenever a contestant is eliminated from the show. She is told that she is not going home alone, but that some doctors will go home with her.

At home, Dr. H goes with Laura to visit her doctor, and she is told that everything is going well. She is going to physical therapy to rehabilitate her legs. She has maintained her weight at 208 pounds (a loss of 77 pounds) and hopes to lose an additional 23 pounds by the finale.

=== Week 16 ===
First aired April 21, 2009

Following the elimination of Laura, it is also revealed that Tara is the only player that has not fallen below the yellow line. Tara is grieving over the loss of her partner, and she blames Jillian for telling Mike to vote Laura off. Jillian confronts her, claiming that Laura needed to go home to recover from her injury and tells Tara to stop being selfish. Meanwhile, Bob talks with Kristin, trying to reassure her after the close vote. Kristin comes to the realization that she deserves to win, and she claims that she was afraid to express this for fear of getting the dream pulled away from her. The contestants are called to a challenge where they answer questions provided by Good Housekeeping. The prize is a trip to New York City. The competition comes down to Kristin and Mike with a tiebreaker based on who can guess the number of calories in a fried fish sandwich without going over. Mike wins the tiebreak by guessing within 5 calories of the correct number which is 640. In the second challenge, the contestants are suspended from platforms 45 feet (14 m) above the ground. Each player is given a rope that is attached to a pulley holding their platform in the air. If the contestant lets go, their platform falls and they are out. Mike drops out first due to his fear of heights. Filipe tries to break the concentration of the others by talking smack and shaking the rig that is supporting them, but in the end, he drops out. The competition comes down to Helen and Tara, and despite Helen trying to bribe Tara, Tara wins her third straight challenge. The prize is either a one-pound advantage at the weigh-in or a $10,000 cash prize. Alison tells Tara she has until the weigh-in to decide.

During the last chance workout, both Bob and Jillian work their players to exhaustion, hoping to get them into the final five. During Jillian's workout, Mike becomes frustrated, and he punches the treadmill. Jillian claims that Mike's anger stems from his anger at always being the fat kid and that he has some issues working out. Jillian tries to get Mike to admit that he is mad at his father for leading him and his brother down an unhealthy path, being the start of his issues. Mike claims that it was his own fault for making unhealthy decisions, but he agrees to talk to his father about the issue. During the confrontation, Ron admits that he played a role in Mike and his brother's weight problems and that Mike has every right to be angry at him. Both father and son state that they will stay committed to losing weight and becoming healthy.

At the weigh-in, Alison asks Tara whether she will take the one-pound advantage or the $10,000. Tara elects to take the money, saying that she is confident in the work she has done this week. As she mounts the scale, she is given the choice to reconsider her $10,000 choice and take the one-pound advantage, and again, she declines. Her hard work pays off, and she loses 5 pounds. Ron weighs in next, hoping to finally get under 300 pounds, a weight he has not been at since he was a young teenager. Ron loses four pounds and reaches his goal, of reaching 298 pounds. Mike weighs in and loses 8 pounds. Helen loses one pound and is distraught as she worked so hard this week. Filipe weighs in and has to lose more than three pounds to be safe. Filipe misses the mark by losing three pounds. Kristin is the last to weigh in, and Alison tells her she only has to lose three pounds to be safe. However, she gains one pound, and she and Helen fall below the yellow line.

After both Kristin and Helen plead their cases, Kristin asks to speak privately with Ron to ensure that he will keep his promise of never putting her name down at an elimination. Ron tells her he will hold to the promise he made to her and her mom and help her make it to the end. Kristin asks Ron to speak to Mike for her since she needs three votes to be able to stay since she has the least amount of weight loss. Ron says he will do so but says he might not be able to convince Mike. In a double-cross, Ron tells Mike to follow through and vote Kristin off, and to make sure that he and Tara were on the same page. Ron keeps his 'promise' to Kristin and votes for Helen. With two votes for Helen and one for Kristin, it came down to Mike who said he was at the ranch for himself. He votes for Kristin, making it a tie and sending Kristin home. Kristin is suspicious of the way the vote turned out, and she claims that there are no coincidences at the house. She tells Mike he 'took the easy way out'. Alison asks Ron whether he knew how Mike would vote, and Ron lies, claiming that he had no prior knowledge. Before Kristin leaves, Alison asks Mike if he thinks he can win the competition now. Both Mike and Ron state that Mike will win. Shots of Filipe, Tara, and Helen show that they are not impressed by Mike's confidence by glaring at him.

Twenty-four hours later, Kristin is shown driving back to her hometown. As she arrives back home, she is greeted by her mother and her husband who both tell her how great she looks. Her family toasts her, telling her how much she has inspired the family to all live healthier lifestyles. Two months later, Kristin is shown giving a motivational speech to help spread her message that began at the ranch—"Change is possible!" Several audience members communicate that they were inspired by Kristin to lose weight and make a change for the better. Kristin has lost a total of 132 pounds, and she hopes to weigh less than 200 pounds by the show's finale.

=== Week 17 ===
First aired April 28, 2009

This week's challenge required each contestant to carry all of the weight that they have lost since starting on the ranch and climb up hills. At the top of each hill, they dropped the weight that was equivalent to how much they had lost that week on the ranch. Although Filipe got a quick lead, Mike caught up quickly. Tara, seeing people ahead of her, was motivated to catch up and she was the first to reach the end and throw her bag off the edge symbolizing the fact that she is putting all that weight behind her and it will never weigh her down again. Tara won yet another challenge and again had to choose between $10,000 or a one-pound advantage. Whatever she did not choose would go to Mike, the second-place winner. This time, she chose the one-pound advantage and Mike received the money. Although Filipe lost ten pounds and Ron nine, he and Ron fell below the yellow line. Filipe was eliminated and is now determined to help inspire his Tongan family. Ron and Mike have lost a combined total of 305 pounds on campus. They had exceeded the 300-pound goal they had set for themselves. Mike lost 11 pounds this week. Helen became the third woman in Biggest Loser history to lose over 100 pounds on the ranch.

=== Week 18 (Semi-Final) ===
First aired May 5, 2009

After Filipe's elimination last week, Helen, Mike, Ron, and Tara are sent home for 30 days before they come back to the ranch for their penultimate weigh-in. They will also later run a marathon and past season contestants including Jim Germanakos (Season 4 at-home winner), Bernie Salazar (Season 5 at-home winner), Heba Salama (Season 6 at-home winner), Ali Vincent (Season 5 winner), and Michelle Aguilar (Season 6 winner) give advice to the final four contestants. Tara finished the marathon first, coming in just under 5 hours. Helen finished second in just under 6 hours. Mike finished third at around 9 hours having had to walk the entire way due to a hip discomfort problem incurred prior to the race. Ron had numerous medical issues while walking the marathon and finished at about 13 hours.

During the weigh-in, Mike and Ron fell below the yellow line, and it was up to America to vote on who would be in the final three. The results of this vote were announced during the live finale on May 12. America selected Mike to be in the final three.

=== Week 19 (Finale) ===
Aired May 12, 2009.

Mike was voted into the top three, eliminating his father Ron. Jerry won the $100,000 at-home prize with a total percentage of weight loss of 47.97%. He weighed in second out of nineteen eliminated contestants, preceded only by his wife, Estella. Helen won the competition, with the highest percentage of weight loss in Biggest Loser history: 54.47%. Mike came in a close second (with 53.35%), and Tara was third (with 52.72%). All three finalists beat the record for most percentage lost in a season (a record that previously belonged to Erik Chopin from season 3 with 52.58%). Helen was the first finalist weighed, and Tara was last. Tara won more challenges than any other contestant and became a finalist without falling below the yellow line. Finally, two new people, Erinn and Amanda, were up for America's vote and a spot on the next season's cast; whichever one did not get the vote would be given special assistance by trainers, therapists, nutritionists, and doctors to lose weight at home. Amanda won the vote, which means that Erinn will get the at-home special assistance package. Erinn would also appear in the week 12 episode of the next season.

== After the show ==
At the end of the Week 8 episode, contestant Dane Patterson is shown running and apparently finishing a marathon with his wife. News broke the day after the episode aired when marathon participants of the Desert Classic Marathon in Arizona came forward to report that the couple had taken a ride in a van for part of the course. NBC issued a public apology that acknowledged that the contestant had not run the entire distance as aired on their show. Arizona Road Racers, the organizing body for the marathon, issued a statement on their website explaining that the Pattersons were not listed in the event results because they did not run the entire 42.195 kilometres (26.219 mi).

Jillian Michaels told TV Guide magazine that while filming the season she was investigated by the show's producer after contestant Filipe Fa accused her of doping participants by providing them with drugs. "I was so furious, so disgusted. I felt so betrayed," Michaels claimed. The week-long inquiry cleared Michaels.

NBC aired a second "Did They Keep The Weight Off" special on November 25, 2009, which featured more than 40 Contestants from the first 7 seasons. Those appearing in the episode included (but were not limited to): Helen, Tara, Mike, Ron, Filipe, Sione, Jerry, Estella, Nicole, and Damien.

Damien Gurganious died from idiopathic thrombocytopenic purpura, a rare autoimmune disorder on November 24, 2014. This caused inoperable bleeding in his brain. He was 38. Season 16, episode 12, "the Playoffs", which first aired on December 11, 2014, ended with his photo and the dedication, "In loving memory of our friend, Damien Gurganious, Season 7 Contestant, 1976–2014." On May 28, 2019, contestant Daniel Wright died from leukemia. On August 15, 2020, contestant Blaine Cotter died from complications of COVID-19. On December 20, 2022, Cathy Skell died from a brief and unexpected illness. On October 28, 2023, Estella Hayes died at the age of 78.

== Footnotes ==
- ^{^[a]} The heaviest contestant across all international versions of the show came from Australia's second season, with a starting weight of 216.3 kg (477 lb).
- ^{^[b]} This title was previously held by Jerry Lisenby of Season 4, who lost 31 pounds (14 kg) in the first week.
- ^{^[c]} Neil Tejwani, from season 4, lost 33 pounds (15 kg) in week 8, but as the result of gaining 17 pounds (7.7 kg) the previous week, due to water loading, so this record may not have been counted, and would not count under current rules, which reset the weight of a contestant who has gained weight back to what it was before that weight gain for the following week's weigh-in.
- ^{^[d]}At the time of taping, the record for weight-loss at the ranch is 144 pounds, set by Roger Schultz, from The Biggest Loser: Couples, who went from 363 pounds to 219 pounds.
