= The Biggest Loser season 5 =

The Biggest Loser
- Season 5
- No. of episodes: 16

Release
- Original network: NBC
- Original release: January 1 – April 15, 2008

Season chronology
- ← Previous; Season 4 Next → Season 6 (Families)

The Biggest Loser: Couples is the fifth season of the NBC reality television series The Biggest Loser. The fifth season premiered on January 1, 2008 with ten overweight couples competing for a cash prize of $250,000. This season featured Days of Our Lives star Alison Sweeney as the host, with trainers Bob Harper and Jillian Michaels; all three returning from season four.

Although the contestants came in as teams of two (couples), the grand prize was eventually awarded to an individual. In the end Ali Vincent won, making her the first female winner in the history of the American Biggest Loser series.

After his elimination from the show, Dan Evans released a country music album in 2008.

== Contestants ==
Contestant	Couples Team	Blue vs. Black	Status	Total votes
Lynn Westphal, 60, Elyria, OH	Green Team		Eliminated Week 1	5
Jenni Westphal, 31, North Ridgeville, OH	Green Team		Eliminated Week 1	5
Curtis Bray, 35, Los Angeles, CA	Brown Team		Eliminated Week 2	4
Mallory Bray, 36, Los Angeles, CA	Brown Team		Eliminated Week 2	4
Amanda Harmer, 29, Oklahoma City, OK	White Team		Eliminated Week 3	4
Neill Harmer, 28, Oklahoma City, OK	White Team		Eliminated Week 3	4
Ali Vincent, Returned Week 11	Pink Team		Eliminated Week 4	1
Bette-Sue Birkland, 53, Mesa, AZ	Pink Team		Eliminated Week 4	1
Jenn Widder, 22, River Edge, NJ	Purple Team	Black Team	Eliminated Week 5	5
Jackie Evans. 49, Frankfort, IL	Orange Team	Blue Team	Eliminated Week 6	4
Trent Patterson, 39, Endicott, NY	Gray Team	Blue Team	Eliminated Week 7	4
Paul Marks, 43, Rockledge, FL	Yellow Team	Black Team	Eliminated Week 8	6
Mark Kruger, Returned Week 11	Black Team	Blue Team	Eliminated Week 9	4
Bernie Salazar, 27, Chicago, IL	Blue Team	Black Team	Eliminated Week 10	5
Maggie King, 23, Denville, NJ	Purple Team	Black Team	Eliminated Week 11	4
Brittany Aberle, 22, San Jacinto, CA	Blue Team	Black Team	Eliminated Week 12	3
Dan Evans, 21, Frankfort, IL	Orange Team	Blue Team	Eliminated Week 13	3
Jay Kruger, 31, New Bedford, MA	Black Team	Blue Team	Eliminated Week 14	2
Mark Kruger, 35, Dartmouth, MA	Black Team	Blue Team	Re-eliminated at Finale	America's Vote Victim
Kelly Fields, 38, Titusville, FL	Yellow Team	Black Team	2nd Runner-Up	4
Roger Shultz, 40, Enterprise, AL	Gray Team	Blue Team	Runner-Up	0
Ali Vincent, 32, Mesa, AZ	Pink Team (Bob)	Pink Team (Jillian)	Biggest Loser	0

Total Votes counts only votes that are revealed at elimination. The total does not count unrevealed votes.

== Weigh-ins and eliminations ==
Contestant	Age	Height	Starting BMI	Ending BMI	Starting weight	Week																Finale	Weight lost	Percentage lost
Contestant	Age	Height	Starting BMI	Ending BMI	Starting weight	1	2	3	4	5	6	7	8	9	10	11		12	13	14	15	Finale	Weight lost	Percentage lost
Ali	32	5'5"	38.9	20.3	234	215	212	206	198							167	160	155	149	146	135	122	112	47.86%
Roger	40	6'3"	45.4	24.9	363	343	340	331	319	309	301	292	276	268	259	X	251	242	236	234	219	199	164	45.18%
Kelly	38	5'6"	43.7	26.1	271	258	257	248	240	240	233	225	218	212	206	X	202	199	192	191	178	162	109	40.22%
Mark	35	5'10"	40.9	22.4	285	268	261	249	235	230	221	215	202	201		195	188	185	181	182^{*}	169	156	129	45.26%
Jay	31	6'1"	38.7	25.1	293	280	275	268	258	253	248	244	228	221	214	X	209	206	201	202		190	103	35.15%
Dan	21	5'8"	47.1	26.5	310	285	277	265	264	251	244	237	226	219	211	X	207	199	198			174	136	43.87%
Brittany	22	5'7"	34.6	25.7	221	211	210	203	201	199	189	188	185	179	174	X	172	170				164	57	25.79%
Maggie	23	5'3"	42.3	29.9	239	229	227	221	218	211	206	204	198	190	184	X	184					169	70	29.29%
Bernie	27	5'5"	47.1	25.5	283	266	261	248	241	236	223	216	211	201	195	195						153	130	45.94%
Paul	43	5'4"	52.0	X	303	286	283	269	260	263^{*}	251	241	236			233						did not attend		
Trent	39	6'1"	57.5	39.7	436	407	401	388	375	366	357	349				331						301	135	30.96%
Jackie	49	5'5"	40.9	26.1	246	231	223	216	214	206	204					182						157	89	36.18%
Jenn	22	5'0"	49.6	37.1	254	242	240	236	229	223						206						190	64	25.20%
Bette-Sue	53	5'5"	43.4	31.0	261	245	239	231	224							212						186	75	28.74%
Amanda	29	5'2"	37.3	25.6	204	190	190	185								158						140	64	31.37%
Neill	28	5'10"	45.5	32.9	317	304	298	292								262						229	88	27.76%
Curtis	35	6'1"	50.3	30.5	381	359	356									281						231	150	39.37%
Mallory	36	5'6"	35.0	24.5	217	203	204									175						152	65	29.95%
Lynn	60	6'2"	52.5	42.2	409	390										345						329	80	19.56%
Jenni	31	5'8"	40.6	32.4	267	260										229						213	54	20.22%

Game
Week's Biggest Loser
Immunity (Challenge or Weigh-In)
Immunity & Week's Biggest Loser
Last person eliminated before finale(by America voting).
Results from Eliminated Players Weigh in (Week 10, episode 11)
Winners
$250,000 Winner (among the finalists)
$100,000 Winner (among the eliminated contestants)
BMI
Underweight (less than 18.5 BMI)
Normal (18.5 – 24.9 BMI)
Overweight (25 – 29.9 BMI)
Obese Class I (30 – 34.9 BMI)
Obese Class II (35 – 39.9 BMI)
Obese Class III (greater than 40 BMI)
Notes

- Paul weighed 263 pounds after Week 5, but because he gained 3 pounds in Week 5, only 9 pounds of his 12 lost were added to the team's total loss.
- Mark weighed 182 pounds after Week 14, but his starting weight was displayed as 181 at the week 15 weigh-in
- Paul did not attend Finale due to illness
- Bette Sue & Ali and Lynn & Jenni were members of Bob's team before Week 5, while Curtis & Mallory and Neill & Amanda were members of Jillian's team before Week 5.
- When Ali returned in Week 11, she switched over to Jillian, but kept her pink shirt.

=== Weight loss history ===
Contestant	Week															
Contestant	1	2	3	4	5	6	7	8	9	10	11	12	13	14	15	Finale
Ali	−19	−3	−6	−8	-31						−7	−5	−6	−3	−11	−13
Roger	−20	−3	−9	−12	−10	−8	−9	−16	−8	−9	−8	−9	−6	−2	−15	−20
Kelly	−13	−1	−9	−8	0	−7	−8	−7	−6	−6	−4	−3	−7	−1	−13	−16
Mark	−17	−7	−12	−14	−5	−9	−6	−13	−1	-6	−7	−3	−4	+1	−13	-13
Jay	−13	−5	−7	−10	−5	−5	−4	−16	−7	−7	−5	−3	−5	+1	-12	
Dan	−25	−8	−12	−1	−13	−7	−7	−11	−7	−8	−4	−8	−1	-24		
Brittany	−10	−1	−7	−2	−2	−10	−1	−3	−6	−5	−2	−2	-6			
Maggie	−10	−2	−6	−3	−7	−5	−2	−6	−8	−6	0	-15				
Bernie	−17	−5	−13	−7	−5	−13	−7	−5	−10	−6	-42					
Paul	−17	−3	−14	−9	+3	-12	−10	−5	-3		x					
Trent	−29	−6	−13	−13	−9	−9	−8	-18			-30					
Jackie	−15	−8	−7	−2	−8	−2	-22				-25					
Jenn	−12	−2	−4	−7	−6	-17					-16					
Bette-Sue	−16	−6	−8	−7	-12						-26					
Amanda	−14	0	−5	-27							-18					
Neill	−13	−6	−6	-30							-33					
Curtis	−22	−3	-75								-50					
Mallory	−14	+1	-29								-23					
Lynn	−19	-45									-16					
Jenni	−7	-31									-16					

- Away from Campus

Notes
Paul's 12 pound weight loss in week 6 was counted towards his team's loss as −9, due to his weight gain the previous week.
Mark's 13 pound weight loss in week 15 was displayed as −12, due to his weight gain the previous week.
x – Paul did not attend Finale due to illness.

=== Weight loss percentage history ===
Contestant	Week															Finale
Contestant	1	2	3	4	5	6	7	8	9	10	11	12	13	14	15	Finale
Ali	−8.12%	−1.40%	−2.83%	−3.88%	-15.66%						−4.19%	−3.13%	−3.87%	−2.01%	−7.53%	−9.63%
Roger	−5.51%	−0.87%	−2.65%	−3.63%	−3.13%	−2.59%	−2.99%	−5.48%	−2.90%	−3.36%	−3.09%	−3.59%	−2.48%	−0.85%	−6.41%	−9.13%
Kelly	−4.80%	−0.39%	−3.50%	−3.23%	0.00%	−2.92%	−3.43%	−3.11%	−2.75%	−2.83%	−1.94%	−1.49%	−3.52%	−0.52%	−6.81%	−8.99%
Mark	−5.96%	−2.61%	−4.60%	−5.62%	−2.13%	−3.91%	−2.71%	−6.05%	−0.50%	-2.99%	−3.59%	−1.60%	−2.16%	+0.55%	-6.63%	-7.69%
Jay	−4.44%	−1.79%	−2.55%	−3.73%	−1.94%	−1.98%	−1.61%	−6.56%	−3.07%	−3.17%	−2.34%	−1.44%	−2.43%	+0.50%	-6.32%	
Dan	−8.06%	−2.81%	−4.33%	−0.38%	−4.92%	−2.79%	−2.87%	−4.64%	−3.10%	−3.65%	−1.90%	−3.86%	−0.50%	-12.12%		
Brittany	−4.52%	−0.47%	−3.33%	−0.99%	−1.00%	−5.03%	−0.53%	−1.60%	−3.24%	−2.79%	−1.15%	−1.16%	-3.53%			
Maggie	−4.18%	−0.87%	−2.64%	−1.36%	−3.21%	−2.37%	−0.97%	−2.94%	−4.04%	−3.16%	0.00%	-8.15%				
Bernie	−6.01%	−1.88%	−4.98%	−2.82%	−2.07%	−5.51%	−3.14%	−2.31%	−4.74%	−2.99%	-21.54%					
Paul	−5.61%	−1.05%	−4.95%	−3.35%	+1.15%	-3.46%	−3.98%	−2.07%	-1.27%		x					
Trent	−6.65%	−1.47%	−3.24%	−3.35%	−2.40%	−2.46%	−2.24%	-5.16%			-9.06%					
Jackie	−6.10%	−3.46%	−3.14%	−0.93%	−3.74%	−0.97%	-10.78%				-13.74%					
Jenn	−4.72%	−0.83%	−1.67%	−2.97%	−2.62%	-7.62%					-7.77%					
Bette-Sue	−6.13%	−2.45%	−3.35%	−3.03%	-5.36%						-12.26%					
Amanda	−6.86%	0.00%	−2.63%	-14.59%							-11.39%					
Neill	−4.10%	−1.97%	−2.01%	-10.27%							-12.60%					
Curtis	−5.77%	−0.84%	-21.07%								-17.79%					
Mallory	−6.45%	+0.49%	-14.22%								-13.14%					
Lynn	−4.65%	-11.54%									-4.64%					
Jenni	−2.62%	-11.92%									-6.99%					

=== Total Overall Percentage of Weight Loss (Biggest Loser on Campus) ===
Bold denotes whom has the overall highest percentage of weight loss as of that week

Contestant	Week														
Contestant	1	2	3	4	5	6	7	8	9	10	11	12	13	14	15
Ali	**-8.12%**	−9.40%	−11.97%	−15.38%	-28.63%						−31.62%	−33.76%	−36.32%	**-37.61%**	**-42.31%**
Roger	−5.51%	−6.34%	−8.82%	−12.12%	−14.88%	−17.08%	−19.56%	−23.97%	−26.17%	−28.65%	−30.85%	−33.33%	−34.99%	−35.54%	−39.67%
Kelly	−4.80%	−5.17%	−8.49%	−11.44%	−11.44%	−14.02%	−16.97%	−19.56%	−21.77%	−23.99%	−25.46%	−26.57%	−29.15%	−29.52%	−34.32%
Mark	−5.96%	−8.42%	−12.63%	**-17.54%**	**-19.30%**	**-22.46%**	**-24.56%**	**-29.12%**	**-29.47%**	-31.58%	**-34.04%**	−35.09%	**-36.49%**	−36.14%	−40.70%
Jay	−4.44%	−6.14%	−8.53%	−11.95%	−13.65%	−15.36%	−16.72%	−22.18%	−24.57%	−26.96%	−28.67%	−29.69%	−31.40%	−31.06%	
Dan	−8.06%	**-10.65%**	**-14.52%**	−14.84%	−19.03%	−21.29%	−23.55%	−27.10%	−29.35%	**-31.94%**	−33.23%	**-35.81%**	−36.13%		
Brittany	−4.52%	−4.98%	−8.14%	−9.05%	−9.95%	−14.48%	−14.93%	−16.29%	−19.00%	−21.27%	−22.17%	−23.08%			
Maggie	−4.18%	−5.02%	−7.53%	−8.79%	−11.72%	−13.81%	−14.64%	−17.15%	−20.50%	−23.01%	−23.01%				
Bernie	−6.01%	−7.77%	−12.37%	−14.84%	−16.61%	−21.20%	−23.67%	−25.44%	−28.98%	−31.10%					
Paul	−5.61%	−6.60%	−11.22%	−14.19%	−13.20%	−17.16%	−20.46%	−22.11%							
Trent	−6.65%	−8.03%	−11.01%	−13.99%	−16.06%	−18.12%	−19.95%								
Jackie	−6.10%	−9.35%	−12.20%	−13.01%	−16.26%	−17.07%									
Jenn	−4.72%	−5.31%	−7.09%	−9.84%	−12.20%										
Bette-Sue	−6.13%	−8.43%	−11.49%	−14.18%											
Amanda	−6.86%	−6.86%	−9.31%												
Neill	−4.10%	−5.99%	−7.89%												
Curtis	−5.77%	−6.56%													
Mallory	−6.45%	−5.99%													
Lynn	−4.65%														
Jenni	−2.62%														

=== Voting history ===
Contestant	Week #														
Contestant	1	2	3	4	5	6	7	8	9	10	11	12	13	14	15
Eliminated	Lynn & Jenni	Curtis & Mallory	Neill & Amanda	Bette-Sue & Ali	Jenn	Jackie	Trent	Paul	Mark	Bernie	Maggie	Brittany	Dan	Jay	Mark
Ali	Lynn & Jenni	Curtis & Mallory	?	X	**Eliminated** Week 4, **Returned** Week 11						Maggie	Brittany	Dan	Jay	Biggest Loser
Roger	?	Paul & Kelly	Neill & Amanda	X	X	Jackie	Trent	X	Mark	Bernie	?	Brittany	Dan	Jay	X
Kelly	Maggie & Jenn	X	?	Bette-Sue & Ali	Jenn	X	X	Bernie	X	X	Brittany	?	Dan	?	Finalist
Mark	?	Paul & Kelly	Neill & Amanda	X	X	Jackie	Trent	X	?	**Elim.** Week 9	Maggie	?	X	X	**Re-eliminated** at Finale
Jay	?	Paul & Kelly	Neill & Amanda	X	X	Jackie	Trent	X	Mark	Bernie	?	X	?	X	**Eliminated** Week 14
Dan	Lynn & Jenni	Curtis & Mallory	?	X	X	Trent	Trent	X	Mark	Bernie	Maggie	Brittany	X	**Eliminated** Week 13	
Brittany	Lynn & Jenni	Curtis & Mallory	Neill & Amanda	X	Jenn	X	X	Paul	X	Kelly	X	X	**Eliminated** Week 12		
Maggie	X	Curtis & Mallory	X	X	Kelly	X	X	Paul	X	Kelly	X	**Eliminated** Week 11			
Bernie	Lynn & Jenni	Curtis & Mallory	Neill & Amanda	X	Jenn	X	X	Paul	X	X	**Eliminated** Week 10				
Paul	Maggie & Jenn	X	?	Bette-Sue & Ali	Jenn	X	X	Bernie	**Eliminated** Week 8						
Trent	?	Paul & Kelly	Neill & Amanda	X	X	Jackie	Mark	**Eliminated** Week 7							
Jackie	Lynn & Jenni	Curtis & Mallory	Neill & Amanda	X	X	Trent	**Eliminated** Week 6								
Jenn	X	Curtis & Mallory	X	X	Kelly	**Eliminated** Week 5									
Bette-Sue	Lynn & Jenni	Curtis & Mallory	?	X	**Eliminated** Week 4										
Amanda	Lynn & Jenni	Paul & Kelly	X	**Eliminated** Week 3											
Neill	Lynn & Jenni	Paul & Kelly	X	**Eliminated** Week 3											
Curtis	Lynn & Jenni	X	**Eliminated** Week 2												
Mallory	Lynn & Jenni	X	**Eliminated** Week 2												
Lynn	X	**Eliminated** Week 1													
Jenni	X	**Eliminated** Week 1													

Immunity
X Below yellow line, unable to vote
X Not in elimination, unable to vote
? Vote not revealed
Extra vote (two votes at elimination)
Eliminated or not in house
Valid vote cast
X Below yellow line, America Votes
Last person eliminated before the finale (by America voting)
$250,000 winner (among the finalists)

== Episode summaries ==
=== Week 1 ===
First aired January 1, 2008

The new "couples" season begins with a challenge: All ten couples must race from the campus grounds along a marked path to the top of a nearby hill. Each member of the couple must touch a flagpole there and return to the starting point. As each couple returns, they may choose with which trainer they want to work out with: Bob or Jillian. Each trainer may work with only five of the couples, so, once that limit is reached, additional couples must go to the remaining trainer.

The second challenge requires the couples to drag a heavy helium-filled color-coordinated weather balloon around a racecourse. The first team to cross the finish line will have a bonus of two pounds added to their weight loss for the week. The last team to arrive will have two pounds subtracted from their week's weight-loss total. Jay & Mark (Black Team) win the challenge with Maggie & Jenn (Purple Team) finishing last.

At the weigh-in, two couples — Lynn & Jenni (Green Team) and Maggie & Jenn (Purple Team) — fall below the yellow line and are put up for elimination. The final result: five votes for the Green Team, one vote for the Purple Team, with the votes of two teams unrevealed. Lynn & Jenni are eliminated. After they return home it is shown that Lynn and Jenni still continued to exercise and watch their weight. Lynn lost a total of 30 lbs and Jenni lost a total of 20 lbs.

=== Week 2 ===
First aired January 8, 2008

This week's reward challenge takes the couples out to the playground. Each team has to get on a giant seesaw, and the first team to achieve 100 repetitions will win a 10-minute call home for each member. Jay and Mark (Black Team) win the reward and an additional responsibility: they must choose three other teams to win the same prize. They select Curtis & Mallory (Brown Team), Roger & Trent (Grey Team) and Neill and Amanda (White Team) for the reward.

The second challenge separates the teams so that each member faces temptation on his or her own: four minutes alone, surrounded by thousands of calories in favorite foods. The team that eats the most calories wins $5,000. Members from only three couples give in to temptation: Mallory, who eats 210 calories; Paul (Yellow Team), who eats 912 calories; and Mark, who eats 925 calories. The Black Team wins the $5,000 by 13 calories.

At the weigh-in, the Brown Team and the Yellow Team both fall below the yellow line and are up for elimination. The final result is four votes for the Brown Team and three votes for the Yellow Team. Curtis and Mallory are eliminated.

Later, it is shown that Mallory and Curtis each reached their weight-loss goal after returning home. Curtis has lost a total of 84 lbs and Mallory has lost a total of 33 lbs.

=== Week 3 ===
First aired January 15, 2008

Dan & Jackie (Orange Team) became the "Biggest Losers of the Week" by winning last week's weigh-in and were asked to select one of three prizes: Luxury, Family, or Gameplay. They did not know the specifics of the prize until after making their choice. After selecting "Gameplay", the Orange Team is awarded two votes at the next elimination. The "Luxury" prize consisted of daily massages for a week (for the team and a team of their choosing). The "Family" prize consisted of a 24-hour visit from a family member.

At the challenge, one member from each team had to run an obstacle course carrying a medicine ball. At the end of the course, the runner placed his or her ball in a rack with eight spaces, each rack representing one of the other teams. Once a team's rack was full, that team was eliminated from the challenge. The Gray Team (Roger & Trent) won the challenge, with the Purple and Blue teams coming in second and third place. As a reward, the Gray Team was given immunity at the next weigh-in.

At the weigh-in, Paul & Kelly (Yellow Team) were the "Biggest Losers of the Week" by posting a 23 lb (4.26%) weight-loss, only a fraction more than Brittany & Bernie. Maggie & Jenn (Purple Team) fell below the yellow line for the second time in three weeks. They were joined by Neill & Amanda (White Team), who drew criticism due to Neill's perceived lazy attitude.

At the vote, Neill & Amanda (White Team) were eliminated after receiving four of seven votes. It was not necessary to count Dan's vote, since a majority was reached.

At home, Neill and Amanda have continued their diets, losing a total of 48 lbs and 43 lbs respectively.

=== Week 4 ===
First aired January 22, 2008

Alison asked the teams to answer the following question: "If you could send one team home, right now, who would it be?" After taking an hour to deliberate, the votes were revealed. The Yellow & Blue teams voted for the Black team, Purple & Black teams voted for the Yellow team, and the Gray & Orange teams voted for the Purple team. Ultimately, the Pink team broke the three-way tie by voting for the Yellow Team (Paul & Kelly).

However, this vote did not send the Yellow team home, but instead it changed the rules. For the next week, the competition would be "all versus one". This meant that at the challenge, all six teams would be in competition against the Yellow team for the reward, and at the weigh-in, if the Yellow team's percentage is lower than the average of the other six teams combined, the Yellow team would go home automatically. However, if the Yellow team's percentage is higher, Paul & Kelly would get to decide which team to eliminate. In addition, the Yellow team was allowed to choose their own exclusive trainer, and they chose Jillian.

As the Biggest Losers of the Week, the Yellow team was asked to choose a reward. Of the three choices, Paul & Kelly selected "Gameplay", which allotted them a two-pound advantage to use on themselves at the weigh in of their choice.. They elected to keep their reward a secret until the weigh-in.

This week's challenge involved a test of balance. Each contestant had to cross a large swimming pool on a balance beam and place 12 pegs (one at a time) into a board on the opposite side. Any contestant to fall off the beam would have to start over. The Yellow team won the challenge, with Paul taking eleven of the twelve trips across the pool. Their reward was letters from home; a prize they elected to give to all the other contestants.

Before the weigh-in, three contestants secretly planned to gain weight by drinking extra water in order to both allow the Yellow team to win, in an effort to eliminate the Black Team (Mark & Jay). The conspiring contestants were: Brittany (Blue Team), Maggie (Purple Team), and Jackie (Orange Team). Later, Jackie's son and teammate, Dan, also joined the group.

At the weigh-in, Paul & Kelly announced that they would use their "two pound advantage". The three teams whose members chose to gain weight before the weigh-in had the three lowest percentages, and the Yellow team won the weigh-in by beating the average. However, the Black team won immunity, as they were the Biggest Losers of the Week, with a percentage of 4.64%.

At elimination, Paul & Kelly decided to eliminate the team who set them apart in the first place, the Pink Team (Bette-Sue & Ali). Alison then announces that the game would be changing again: As of next week, "no more couples".

Meanwhile, after the show, it is revealed that Ali & Bette-Sue have continued their diets and their healthy lifestyles. Ali managed to lose 61 lbs and Bette-Sue has lost 49 lbs.

=== Week 5 ===
First aired January 29, 2008

At the physical challenge, the contestants are brought to a shopping mall to face a pair of two-story escalators, each going down. Bob and Jillian are both on hand — presumably to cheer the contestants on, but Alison says differently. The trainers are actually the contestants: The first trainer to complete ten laps of running up a down escalator will win the right to choose which three teams to train with from now going forward. The two trainers are evenly matched through the first two laps, but eventually Bob pulls ahead and wins the challenge. As the new Blue Team trainer, he chooses the former Orange Team (Dan & Jackie), Black Team (Mark & Jay), and Gray Team (Roger & Trent). This means Jillian, the new Black Team trainer, will now train the former Yellow Team (Paul & Kelly), Purple Team (Maggie & Jenn), and Blue Team (Bernie & Brittany).

No sooner have Bob and Jillian passed out their new team shirts than Alison announces there will be a team challenge after all. This time, it is a matter of endurance: Each team will get on the escalator, and the team with the last player standing will win. The winning team will split $10,000. The challenge begins with Paul (Black Team) and Trent (Blue Team) immediately riding down the escalators and stepping off — each has a torn meniscus in his knee. After that, the order in which the players drop out (and the amount of time he or she lasts) is: Kelly (2:55), Jenn (3:11), Jackie (5:00), Roger (8:24), Maggie (10:04), Bernie (12:30), and Brittany (23:59). Brittany was the last member of the Black Team to drop out, and the Blue Team wins the challenge, with Mark, Jay and Dan still on the escalator.

At the Temptation, contestants are confronted with a major source of sugar in the American diet: Soda. Alison shows them a table covered with 240 plastic cups of soda, in several different flavors. One of the cups is marked with a gold star. All the other cups are marked with the number of calories that soda contains. The person who finds the star gets to choose one player from the opposing team and make their weight not count at the next weigh-in. At the word "go," neither team makes a move toward the soda. Alison tempts them further by telling them that the star is not on a cup of orange soda, reducing the number of possible cups to 190. Still, no one moves. Alison makes one final offer: The star is not on a cup of grape soda, reducing the number to 110. Still, no takers. Alison begins a ten-second countdown to the end of the challenge.

As she reaches "two," Brittany (Black Team) makes a move toward the table. She quickly turns around, though, and walks back to her team. Time expires, and Alison shows that the marked cup was the one at the front corner of the table, most accessible to the contestants.

At the weigh-in, the double scale set-up has been removed with a single scale in its place. The new Blue Team weighs in first. Mark and Jay are up, and they each lose 5 lbs. Trent loses 9 lbs, Roger drops ten. Jackie shed 8 lbs this week, and Dan earns himself the title 'Biggest Loser Player' for the week, having dropped 13 lbs, for a team loss of 50 lbs (3.00%). The new Black Team needs to lose an average of 6 lbs each in order to win, or 42 lbs combined. While Jenn (−6), Maggie (−7) and Bernie (−5) each keep to the average, Brittany loses only two pounds; Kelly loses no weight; and Paul gains three pounds. The Black Team has a weight-loss percentage of 1.22% and goes to the Elimination Room.

At elimination, Bernie, Brittany, Kelly and Paul vote for Jenn, while Jenn and Maggie vote for Kelly. Jenn is eliminated, and it is shown that at home, Jenn has continued her diet and is now down to 201 lbs.

=== Week 6 ===
First aired February 5, 2008

The two teams participate in a chocolate-caramel candy Temptation: whoever eats the most of 100 candies in front of them in five minutes wins. The prize is a chance to change the teams by swapping any two players, including the winner, from one team to the other. Dan, Maggie, Jackie, Trent, and Jay eat none of the candies. Paul eats three, and Roger eats one. Brittany, of the Black Team, eats 15, while Mark, of the Blue Team, eats 43 candies. Bernie eats none of the candies but mashed about a dozen of them into his face, explaining: "My game plan was pretty much to get as close to the chocolate as possible, without eating it. And, I really feel that I accomplished that." Mark is declared the winner but chooses not to make any changes to either team.

Mark learns that he has a stress fracture in his right leg. He must wear a cast and limit his workouts to primarily upper-body exercises.

The Team Challenge turns out not to be physical. It is a cooking competition, judged by Alison and celebrity chef Rocco DiSpirito. The contestants are given 15 minutes to shop for ingredients at Whole Foods Market, and must adapt Rocco's recipes to create calorie-controlled appetizers, entrées and desserts. After tasting both efforts, Rocco indicates that he had a hard time choosing a winner. "I'm down to splitting hairs at this point," he says. The Black Team wins the challenge, by providing a three-course meal for under 800 calories. The reward is a dinner made by Rocco, and presents from home — video messages from the contestants' families.

At the Weigh-In, the Blue Team goes first. Dan loses 7 lbs, and Jackie only drops 2. Trent goes up next and sheds 9 lbs, while his partner, Roger, loses 8. Then is time for Mark & Jay. Jay loses 5 lbs and Mark, despite a stress fracture in his leg, drops 9 lbs, achieving a team weight loss of 40 lbs (2.48%). In order for the Black Team to win, its five members must lose an average of almost six pounds each, or 29 lbs. After only four team members weigh in (Kelly loses 7, Paul drops 12, Brittany loses 10, and Maggie loses 5.) they reach the goal — Brittany's 10-pound weight loss gives them a percentage of 2.70%. Bernie's 13-pound weight loss is "just icing on the cake," says Alison, and gives the team a final weight-loss of 47 lbs, or a percentage of 4.09%. The Black Team wins the weigh-in and sends the Blue Team to Elimination. Mark's 9-pound weight loss makes him the team's Biggest Loser for the week, and immune from the vote.

During the deliberation, Jackie suggests that Trent has been "very, very homesick," and that the team should vote to eliminate him. She asks Mark and Jay to "swear on your children's lives" that they will not vote for her or her son, Dan, without telling them first. At the vote, however, Jackie and Dan each cast votes for Trent, while Trent, Roger, Mark and Jay each cast votes for Jackie. Jackie is eliminated. The episode ends with Alison advising the Blue Team to deal with its trust issues.

Meanwhile, at home, Jackie has dropped even more weight for a total weight loss of 76 lbs.

=== Week 7 ===
First aired February 12, 2008

The episode begins with Dan talking about how upset he is with his team, and how he feels betrayed because they lied to him and Jackie. He does not know how he will be able to still be on a team with guys he does not trust. However, he decides to pretend that he forgives them and understands what they did, just so that he will be able to remain on the team. Mark and Jay apologize and say they would never lie to him again. They say it went against their core values and that they could have handled it better.

Bernie is the Biggest Loser for Week 6 and for his reward he chooses "Gameplay" which gives him "50% off at the next challenge." The Challenge turns out to be that two pairs from each team will have to hold up the amount of weight that they have lost using a pulley system over water. The team that holds on the longest wins. The prize is two immunities — one for the winning team and one to give to the other team. From the Black team, the contestants are Bernie and Brittany — who have the least weight to hold up, due to Bernie's prize. Maggie and Paul also compete. Kelly and Trent are each chosen to sit out of the challenge. From the Blue Team, Roger and Jay compete. They are the first to fall into the water. Mark and Dan work together but Mark has a lot of difficulty finding his balance and holding up so much weight; they are the second team into the water. The Black team wins the Challenge.

Jillian states that the only fair way to pick who will get immunity on the Black Team is to place names in a hat, and to pull them out one by one. Maggie's name is last one to be pulled so she wins immunity. It is later revealed at the weigh-in that the Black Team chooses Jay on the Blue Team to also receive immunity.

At the weigh-in, the Black team is very nervous. They feel their high numbers from Week 6 will mean lower numbers this week. They weigh in first and Paul, Kelly and Bernie all have lost significant weight. Paul has dropped 10 lbs, Kelly has lost 8, and Bernie shed 7. Then Brittany weighs in and loses only one pound, followed by Maggie who loses two pounds. The Black Team's weight-loss is 28 lbs (2.54%). Kelly is upset because she feels that she will be the one to go home, if they lose. She worries that Bernie, Brittany, and Maggie have a stronger bond because they are closer to each other in age, and that she and Paul do not fit in as well.

The Blue Team must lose an average of seven pounds per man in order to win the weigh-in, or 35 lbs total. Trent, Roger, and Dan all meet or exceed that goal (Trent loses 8, Roger drops 9, and Dan sheds 7). Mark, however, loses only six pounds. Jay is last to weigh in and needs a 5-pound loss in order to win. He loses only four, giving the Blue Team a final percentage of 2.48%. The Black Team wins. Everyone is shocked, and Bob looks like he is so disappointed that he walked right out of the room; his team lost by only one pound. The Blue Team is forced to send someone home. Again.

They meet as a team and Trent volunteers to leave the competition. He has been suffering from a knee injury, and feels that it is really bothering him too much to be able to continue to keep up with the strenuous workouts. He says he would be better off going home, getting his knee fixed, and finishing on his own.

At the end of the episode, Alison reveals that all of the contestants will be going home during Week 8, but she does not elaborate on the details.

Trent is shown reuniting with his family. To date, he has lost 112 lbs.

=== Week 8 ===
First aired February 19, 2008

Alison announced that the contestants will face their biggest challenge yet, before sending them home for the week. It was then up to them to stick to their diets and continue their workouts on their own.

Later, the trainers are also informed about the contestants going home this week. Both discuss what the contestants need to do in order to pass this challenge, and they will call each contestant on the phone twice a day to keep them on track.

Each contestant is faced with a welcome home celebration with their families and friends. There are tempting foods at the parties but all the contestants seem to do well.

They are all shown throughout the week doing different things. Bernie goes to his favorite bakery with his friends and there is a cupcake that they have named for him. Bernie goes so far as to smell it but does not taste it. Brittany is shown going out with her friends. At a bar, all the girls order drinks and beers while Brittany orders a "water on the rocks." Jay goes out to dinner with his family and he is tempted by the meals that his kids are having, but he eats a healthy dinner. Roger also goes to dinner with his family and is tempted by French fries but only holds one in his hand and does not eat it. He orders a steak and steamed vegetables for dinner.

Paul is the only contestant who seems to have forgotten what he learned and makes some very unhealthy choices. He is shown drinking soda many times and, at a family dinner, he eats many fried chicken wings.

Some of the contestants are shown exercising as well. Maggie goes with her former partner Jenn to her trainer and they work out together. Mark and Jay go a gym together and work out very strenuously. Dan is shown with his mom, Jackie, playing dodgeball with kids at a youth program they run. Dan comments that he and his mom were never able to play with the kids before, and how nice it is to be able to do that now.

The contestants return to the campus the day before weigh in. The Blue Team meets with Bob and they discuss their week. All admitted to minor indulgences, but ultimately they did well. The Black Team meets with Jillian where they too admit to minor things but nothing too bad. Paul gets scolded by Jillian because she was unable to speak with him the whole time. He said that he did not know that it was her calling so he did not pick up his phone, but Kelly said that he did know and he chose not to speak to her. He apologizes and tells Jillian that he was not so good all week.

They are faced with a challenge that evening. Three contestants from each team have to compete. The challenge is an endurance test where the contestants have to keep ducking under or jumping over a swinging bar. Contact with the bar will cause it to break and eliminate the contestant. Roger hits his bar and is out first. Bernie is second. The challenge goes for a long time and Roger tries to broker a deal with the Black Team to make it a draw. They do not accept. Dan is then eliminated, leaving only Jay for the Blue team against Maggie and Brittany. The next one out is Maggie. Brittany claims she will never give up and she is correct. After several more rounds, Jay finally gets out and Brittany wins for the Black team. The prize was that the Black Team gets to pick two players from the Blue Team to weigh in immediately — 24 hours earlier than everyone else, thus losing the benefits of a last chance workout.

The Black Team chooses Dan and Roger to weigh in early. Dan drops 11 lbs and Roger drops a staggering 16 lbs for a total of 27 lbs. Bob is surely shocked (and pleasantly surprised) by the numbers.

At weigh in the next day it is revealed what Dan and Roger had lost. The Black team was surprised as well and was quickly losing their confidence. Then Mark and Jay weigh in — Mark lost 13 lbs and Jay lost a whopping 16 lbs for a total of 56 lbs (5.67%). The Black Team knew that these were phenomenal numbers to overcome, having needed to have lost 61 lbs just to overtake them. Alas, they fail miserably. Maggie, Kelly, and Bernie, however, seemed to have done well at home. Maggie shed 6 pounds, Kelly lost 7, and Bernie dropped 5. Brittany, however, lost only 3 pounds, and Paul shed 5 pounds. The team ends up losing a total of 26 lbs (2.42%).

Jay wins Biggest Loser Player of the week for losing the most on the Blue Team, while Kelly; having the biggest percent of weight-loss on her team, won immunity from elimination.

In the elimination room, Paul shows up wearing his original Yellow Team shirt. He says he is wearing it because he never felt like a member of the Black Team and felt that he and Kelly are outsiders. Kelly did not agree with him, saying that they were a team and had to work together with the others and that he may be Yellow, but she is Black. Ultimately, Paul and Kelly both vote for Bernie while Bernie, Brittany and Maggie all vote for Paul. Paul is eliminated.

After Paul returns home, he is afflicted with double pneumonia and, as a result, puts back on a few of the pounds he lost. He then recovered and continued losing weight. His weight has decreased by a total of 64 lbs since starting the competition.

=== Week 9 ===
First aired February 26, 2008

Jay won Biggest Loser of the Week in Week 8. When he climbs the hill to get his prize, the envelopes which usually read "Luxury", "Family", or "Gameplay" each have a large question mark on the outside instead. He chooses the one on viewer's right — which he designates "Number Three" to represent the three loved ones whom he left behind at home. The card inside the envelope reads: "Vegas Baby Vegas!" Alison reveals that Jay and his Blue Team have won a two-day trip for all of them to Las Vegas. Bob does not like the idea but, since he cannot prevent them from going, he does what he can to prepare them with an intense pre-trip workout.

The Blue Team arrives at the Planet Hollywood Hotel and Casino. They notice the casino entrance right away, and some are tempted to try a few games first. Mark, however, asks them all to think "W.W.B.D." — "What Would Bob Do?" They decide their trainer would want them to put a workout before pleasure, so they hit the gym first thing. Afterwards, they go to their suite to find that Bob has provided each member with a new suit of clothes for "painting the town blue," as Roger puts it. Just as they are about to go out again, there is a knock at the door: It's Room Service. The Black Team has sent them tables and tables full of all kinds of food and drink, including sweet desserts, as a temptation. None of the Blue Team members are shown eating any of the calorie-rich food.

The Blue Team hits the casino, and are shown riding a carnival ride, playing craps and blackjack, and socializing with other guests. Jay and Mark want to work out when the gym re-opens at 7 a.m., so they leave for bed by 2:45 a.m. Dan and Roger, however, do not make it back to the suite until after 6 a.m. Roger sleeps until about 9 a.m., and is upset with Mark and Jay for not waking him. He leaves to work out. Dan sleeps in until nearly noon, and skips his morning workout. Before the Blue Team returns to the ranch, they all stop to get new tattoos with the word "Pride" to represent their unity as a team.

This week's challenge is The Biggest Loser Obstacle Course. The obstacles include flipping 200-pound tires, moving a ton's worth of heavy sandbags, crawling on their bellies to push medicine balls, and a half-mile all-out foot race to the finish. The entire team must cross the finish line at the same time. The Blue Team leads the challenge from the first obstacle, and the Black Team never manages to close the gap. The Blue Team wins. Each member of the winning team will receive an all-expenses paid trip for two to Puerto Rico. Jillian expresses relief that the prize will not affect the weigh-in.

At the weigh-in, the Black Team gets weighed first. Jillian felt that the team needed to lose a total of 32 lbs in order to have the best chance against the Blue Team, considering their competition. After three members weigh in, the total weight lost is 20 lbs — Kelly dropped 6, Maggie lost 8, and Brittany shed 6. Bernie is last to weigh in and posts a ten-pound drop. This gives the Black Team a Week 9 weight loss of 30 lbs (3.69%). Alison says this means the Blue Team must lose a total of more than 34 lbs, or about 9 lbs in order to win. After three members weigh in, the team loses 22 lbs – Roger dropped 8, while Dan and Jay each lose 7 lbs. Mark is last to weigh in and, despite being the only one except for his brother who stuck to the workout regiment, only shed 1 pound. That gave the Blue Team a weight-loss of 23 lbs (2.47%). The Black Team wins the weigh-in. Dan is the Blue Team's biggest loser; he is immune from the upcoming vote.

Before Elimination, the Blue Team — particularly Mark — are shown agonizing over the decision of whom to send home. They finally unanimously decide that Roger, Dan and Jay will all vote for Mark. This is exactly how the vote goes. Mark is eliminated after having lost 84 lbs at the ranch.

As of today, Mark has reduced further to 195 lbs.

=== Week 10 ===
First aired March 4, 2008

Bernie is the Biggest Loser for Week 9 and wins a prize. He picks "Gameplay" and earns the right to grant immunity to any person on either team — except himself.

There is a Temptation Challenge. Each contestant goes into a room with a vending machine and makes a selection. What falls out, however, is random: If junk food falls, it must be eaten. If a pack of Extra sugar-free gum falls, the contestant wins the money amount designated on the package, anywhere from $500 to $5,000, and also gets a free turn — that is if junk food falls on the next turn, it does not have to be eaten. For each player, there is also a 1-Pound Pass, which adds one pound to his or her weight loss at weigh in. Contestants can take as many turns as they want, but once a 1-Pound Pass falls, their turn is over. In the end, Dan has to eat a lot of junk food and also wins a lot of money, but not the pass. Kelly also has to eat a lot of junk food and finally gives up without getting a pass. Everyone else wins the 1-Pound Pass.

The Physical Challenge is a race in which the contestants have to 'fly' across a zip line over a canyon and pull off up to 14 flags. The team with the most flags wins a trip in a fighter airplane. The Blue Team wins.

After the challenge Bernie announces to the Black Team that he has an immunity to give to anyone except himself. He thought of giving it to Brittany, but Kelly suggests to give to Jay so Dan or Roger would go home if the Blue team loses the next weigh-in. Brittany then told him he can do whatever he wants to do with it.

At the weigh in, Alison announces that the game has changed once again. There is no more Blue Team or Black Team. They will compete as individuals. Just like the first four weeks, the two lowest weight-loss percentages will fall below the yellow line and those contestants will be up for elimination. Bernie announces that he would grant the immunity he won to his teammate Brittany.

Dan lost 8 lbs (−99 total), Roger lost 8 (−104 total) making him the seventh person overall to reach the 100 lb milestone. Maggie loses 6 lbs (−55 total), and Jay dropped 7 (−79 total)

Bernie (−6) and Kelly (−6) fall below the yellow line, with weight-loss percentages of 3.48% and 2.83%, respectively. Had Bernie not granted his immunity to Brittany (−5), whose percentage of 3.35% was not included in the final determination, they would have swapped positions, with him above the yellow line and her below. Because two out of the four members of the former Black Team are up for elimination, the decision of whom to send home falls to the former Blue Team, for all intents and purposes. Roger, Dan and Jay feel that both Kelly and Bernie are a threat, so they are unsure whom to vote off, at first.

In the Elimination Room, Brittany and Maggie each vote for Kelly, but all three members of the former Blue Team vote for Bernie, marking him as the bigger threat. Bernie is eliminated. He says he has no regrets and was still happy that he saved Brittany, as they were the last of the original teams still standing and he wanted her to be able to stay.

At the end of the broadcast it is shown that Bernie had now lost over 100 lbs.

=== Week 11 ===
First aired March 11, 2008

The show opens with something of a surprise: Almost immediately after Bernie is eliminated for Week 10, the six remaining contestants are called back to the gym for yet another weigh-in. But it is not they who go on the scales, however — the first fourteen eliminated contestants return for a second chance at the title of the Biggest Loser and the prize of $250,000. Alison announces that the man and woman with the highest percentage of weight lost will rejoin the game. The women are weighed first; Jenni of the former Green Team has dropped 38 lbs, Mallory of the former Brown Team lost 42 lbs, Amanda of the former White Team shed 46 lbs, Bette-Sue of the former Pink Team lost 49 lbs, Jenn of the former Purple Team, lost 48 lbs, and Jackie of the former Orange Team lost 64 lbs. Ali, formerly of the Pink Team, wins with a weight loss of 67 lbs (28.63%). The men weigh in next; Lynn (Green) shed 64 lbs, Curtis (Brown) dropped a staggering 100 lbs. Neill (White) lost 55 lbs, Trent (Grey) dropped 105 lbs, Paul (Yellow) shed 70 lbs, and Bernie (Blue) lost 88 lbs, two pounds shy of beating Mark, formerly of the original Black Team and Bob's reformed Blue Team, who won with a weight loss of 90 lbs (31.58%). Since Mark had the higher percentage, he got to choose which of the two trainers he wants to work with. Mark chose Bob. This means that Ali, who originally trained with Bob, must switch over to Jillian. Ali declines the Black Team's T-shirts and workout gear, and elects to stay with her original Pink Team clothes in honor of Bette-Sue, her mother and former teammate. Both trainers are ecstatic to see their former trainees back.

This week's physical challenge is the first in which the contestants compete for themselves. Each one will use a stationary bicycle to generate energy that, in turn, lights up a string of ten light bulbs. The last two players to illuminate their bulbs will be out of that round of the challenge. The last winner will receive an extra vote at the next elimination. In the first round, Mark, Dan, Jay, Roger, Maggie and Brittany are first to light their ten bulbs. Kelly and Ali are eliminated. In the second round, Mark, Dan, Jay, Roger are first to finish. Brittany and Maggie are eliminated. In Round Three, Mark and Dan defeat Jay and Roger to go to the final round. Dan won the final head-to-head competition and the prize of an extra elimination vote.

At the Week 11 weigh-in, Alison reminds everyone of the rules: The two individuals whose weight-loss percentages fall below the yellow line will be up for elimination. Alison also asks Brittany if she thinks everyone has the same chance. Brittany is pessimistic. When Alison presses the question, Jillian reacts strongly — even profanely — asking Alison to refrain from asking Brittany such questions because "she had a bad week." Alison is surprised, and gives the trainers the option of leaving the gym during the weigh-in. Bob and Jillian both decided to stay.

Mark and Ali are first to weigh in since this was their first week back. Both of them dropped 7 lbs, but Ali's percentage is higher (4.19% to Mark's 3.59%). Dan (−4), Roger (−8) and Jay (−5) each weigh in next, but none of them lose enough weight to beat Ali's score. Ultimately, Maggie (0) and Brittany (−2) fall below the yellow line and will be sent to elimination. Since the time allowance for this episode was already exceeded due to the earlier weigh in, the elimination results for this week will be revealed in Week 12.

=== Week 12 ===
First aired March 18, 2008

Week 12 begins with the elimination ceremony left over from Week 11. Dan casts both of his votes for Maggie while Kelly chooses to send Brittany home. The 2–1 tally tension is quickly broken, however, as both Ali and Mark also vote for Maggie. (Neither Jay's nor Roger's vote is revealed.) Maggie is eliminated, and her home footage reveals she has lost a total of 67 lbs.

This episode focuses on making over the remaining contestants. At Macy's, each of them receives an outfit, a $1,000 gift card and a new look, coordinated by guest star Tim Gunn of Bravo's Project Runway. Every one also is challenged to take his or her new look down a fashion catwalk, with a member of their family in the audience as a surprise guest. The fashion show is photographed for a feature in Prevention Magazine.

This week's physical challenge brings the contestants back to the Biggest Loser swimming pool — actually on a platform raised ten feet above the pool. On the platform are seven treadmills, one for each contestant. The players must walk backwards on their treadmills in a test of endurance, with both the incline and speed increasing at regular intervals. The last person to keep from dropping into the water would win a week at a fitness resort in St. George, Utah. Everyone lasted more than 40 minutes on the treadmills but Kelly (40:19) dropped out first — followed by Roger (40:25), Dan (41:35), Brittany (45:02), Jay (56:10) and Ali (~1:05:00). Mark won the prize.

At this week's weigh in, Ali lost 5 lbs, Jay dropped only 3 lbs, Roger shed 9 lbs and Dan dropped 8 lbs, which, ironically, was enough to beat out Ali and win the weigh-in. Brittany only lost 2 lbs, however, as was below the yellow line, with Kelly as the last person to get on the scale. She lost 3 lbs and kept herself above the line; Jay and Brittany are below the yellow line, with weight-loss percentages at 1.44% and 1.16%, respectively. At the table, Roger, Dan and Ali voted for Brittany, sending her home at once.

At home, it is revealed that Brittany has fulfilled her dreams and faced her skydiving fears, and she has lost a total of 62 lbs.

=== Week 13 ===
First aired March 25, 2008

Alison calls the players back to the elimination room after having just eliminating Brittany. She reveals they will take a quiz on what they have learned. Three questions are asked in total

1. How many calories do you have to burn to lose one pound? 2. How many pounds did Curtis lose when he returned to the ranch in Week Eleven? 3. How many calories are in a cup of fat-free strawberry yogurt?

— Dan emerges as the winner. His prize is a piece of chocolate cake that is 600 calories, and he is advised to bring it intact to the next challenge.

Dan closely guards the cake, but Roger plays a trick on him by hiding the cake in the laundry room, and leaving a note on Dan's bed implicating Kelly in the "theft".

While working out in the gym, Dan puts the cake on a treadmill (without turning it on). Trainer Bob sees the platter on the treadmill, reveals the cake, and is not amused. Bob says that seeing Dan carry that cake everywhere he went drove him, Bob, crazy.

The challenge takes place in a basketball arena, with a table on the court for each player. The contestants are told to take high-calorie concession foods, such as French fries, pizza and ice cream, from stations all over the stadium and place the food on any table except for their own. The player with the fewest calories on their table at the end of 20 minutes would win $10,000. Dan brings the cake he won to the challenge intact and he is told he can place it on any player's table; he puts it on Kelly's table. The men stick with a plan of only putting food on the women's tables in a show of solidarity. When time expires, the standings are (from most calories to fewest): Kelly (15,061), Ali (14,237), Dan (5,736), Mark (5,612), Roger (4,895) and Jay (4,480). Jay wins the challenge. His prize is Ten Thousand Dollars. Alison then reveals a twist, saying that Jay can either keep the $10,000 for himself, or use it to buy a one-pound pass for the next weigh-in.

After the challenge, Ali is angry that she was a target in the challenge and decides to enter an alliance with Kelly to avoid getting themselves and their trainer eliminated. (If a trainer has only one contestant left, and that contestant is eliminated from the competition, then his or her trainer is eliminated as well.)

At the weigh-in, Alison asks Jay for his decision. He chooses to buy the one-pound pass for $10,000. His weight loss of 5 lbs, plus his one-pound pass, gives him a weight-loss percentage of 2.91%. Roger lost 6 lbs (2.48%); Mark lost 4 lbs (2.16%); and Dan lost only 1 lb (0.50%). Ali dropped 6 lbs and Kelly shed 7 lbs, for percentages of 3.87% and 3.52%, respectively. The women surprise the men of the former Blue Team by coming in first and second at the weigh-in, while Dan and Mark each fall below the yellow line.

During deliberation, Jay says he will not vote for his brother again while the others appear to be more equivocal in debating.

In the elimination room, however, Jay's choice is not revealed as Kelly, Ali and Roger all cast their votes for Dan.

In the Biggest Loser update, it is revealed that Dan moved to Los Angeles to pursue his music career with a newfound confidence from his weight loss. He has lost a total of 125 lbs.

=== Week 14 ===
First aired April 1, 2008

The remaining contestants go to Australia, and they spent the next week there, while visiting Australian landmarks and tasting Australian cuisine. During this time, they met with Adro, the winner of Biggest Loser Australia season 1. For this week's challenge, the five remaining contestants competed in a triathlon, which includes swimming 300 meters across the Sydney Harbour, then riding on bicycles, and finally running across a park and climbing up a 44-story building to the top, where Alison is waiting for them. Mark arrives first, but he waits for Ali to arrive, and she crosses the finish line carrying him on her back. Jay finished third, Roger finished fourth, and all of them went down the stairs to encourage Kelly to the end. The race was considered a tie since Mark was carried on Ali's back, and so they both got the prize. They both got to ride on a sea plane, then eat an outdoor breakfast together with a breathtaking view of the ocean, and a phone call home.

At the weigh-in, two players gain weight in the same week for the first time all game, as Mark and Jay each gained one pound. Kelly lost one pound, Roger dropped two, and Ali won the weigh in again for the second time in a row, and the third overall, by posting a 3-pound weight loss. Mark and Jay are up for elimination. As they deliberated, Jay volunteered to go home (as Mark did earlier when he was originally eliminated in week 9), and they ended up voting him out. It is then revealed by Alison that both Bob and Jillian will not return with the Final Four to America. They will have to fend for themselves as they fight for one last chance to stick around and make it to the Final three.

Later, they show Jay at home, where he reached his weight loss goal of 100 lbs, and plans to run in a 10K event.

=== Week 15 ===
First aired April 8, 2008

When the final four return from Australia, they are greeted by celebrity chef Rocco Dispirito, who last appeared on the show back in Week 6. He tempts them with their favorite foods cooked by their families, calories and all. Roger is the only contestant to take a bite of his mom's pepper steak. Rocco then shows them how to make healthy versions of those favorite dishes, with calories reduced in each dish by over 600 each.

Later, they arrived down at the beach for the final reward challenge of the season. Each contestant had to run a course along the sand wearing a padded "fat suit," which was an exact replica of what their bodies looked like when they first arrived at the ranch, and its weight was equal to the exact number of pounds the contestant had lost so far. After shedding the suit, they must then carry their flag and plant it at the top of a nearby hill. The prize was personalized healthy prepared meals (provided by the new Biggest Loser Meal Plan) during the months at home before the finale and $10,000. Roger had to carry 129 lbs on his fat suit, Ali had 88 lbs, Kelly had 80 lbs, and Mark had 103 lbs. Mark ended up winning the challenge.

Later in the week, the players go to their last chance workout, with their trainers having just arrived there to help them. In the confessionals, they each talk about their struggles in the game and the benefits of participating.

Then to the final weigh-in they went. Only three of the remaining four contestants would be guaranteed a spot in the finale. Roger went up first, and reached a personal goal he set earlier — to break a Biggest Loser campus record — by posting a loss of 15 lbs for the week, he brought his total weight loss to 144 pounds, one pound more than contestant Neil Tejwani from Season Four, who went from 421 to 278 while on campus. Roger's weight-loss percentage was 6.41%. Mark was next, and dropped 12 lbs for a percentage of 6.63%. The two remaining women contestants surprised everyone once again. Ali lost 11 lbs (7.53%), pushing Roger below the yellow line. The biggest man in the house was finally below the line. But who would join him? Mark or Kelly?

Kelly ended up also shocking the room, losing 13 lbs (6.81%) pushing Mark below the line. The last two members of Bob's reformed Blue Team were up for elimination. But as always, things are not always as they seem. Alison had one final surprise, however: The choice of who moves on and who gets eliminated was out of Ali and Kelly's hands. The third finalist will be "chosen by America", who cast their votes at the network's website, www.nbc.com.

Both Mark and Roger had a chance to plea their case to America in the confessionals, as to why they should be voted to stay in the Final Three. Then both Bob and Jillian said their goodbyes to the Final Four, and sent them off back home to continue their journey.

=== Finale (Week 16) ===
First aired April 15, 2008

The Finale began by announcing that Roger won over Mark in the fans' voting by around 100,000 votes from the millions of votes cast, granting him a slot in the final three, joining Kelly and Ali, and eliminating Mark. This makes Mark the first ever contestant to have been eliminated twice before the Finale. Next they showed each of the three finalists (as well as Mark) as they reunited with their families. Afterwards, they introduced the 16 eliminated players (Paul did not attend) and their newly transformed bodies. After that, they changed into their Biggest Loser uniforms, and it was time for the weigh in for the $100,000 consolation prize. Jenni (Green) lost 54 lbs and Lynn shed 80 lbs. Mallory (Brown) shed 65 lbs and Curtis dropped 150 lbs, meaning he could qualify for health insurance. Amanda (White) shed 64 lbs and Neill lost 88 lbs. Bette-Sue (Pink) dropped 75 lbs. Jenn (Purple) lost 64 lbs and Maggie dropped 70 lbs. Jackie (Orange) lost 89 lbs and Dan shed 136 lbs, taking the lead from Curtis. Trent (Gray) went next and dropped 135 lbs. Bernie (Blue) lost 130 lbs and took the lead from Dan. Brittany (Blue) is next and dropped 57 lbs. Jay (Black) dropped 103 lbs and Mark, the last eliminated contestant at the season, dropped 129 lbs, two pounds short of beating out Bernie. Bernie was declared the winner in the end and took home the $100,000 consolation cash prize.

Then the Final Three came back out and showed off their newly transformed bodies, and then it was time for the Final weigh-in. Roger went first, representing his Gray Team and dropped 164 lbs in the seven months of the competition. Kelly was up next, representing the Yellow Team alone and shed a total of 109 lbs. Ali became the first female Biggest Loser in the US series' history after posting a total weight loss of 112 lbs. She is also only the second female winner in the show's history, after Poppi from Season 3, who won the "At Home" segment. She is also the first U.S. winner to have trained with both Bob and Jillian, and furthermore the first winner to come back after being originally eliminated in an earlier week (Adro, the winner of the first season of the Australian version of the show, holds both distinctions overall). However, internationally, Ali is not the first female biggest loser; that honor belongs to a woman named Andreia Dutra from the first Brazilian season (see "International versions of the show").

There were only six weeks between the time the finalists left the campus and the live broadcast, the shortest time in Biggest Loser history.

The MSN Heath & Fitness Million Pound Matchup participants lost a total of 1,129,347 pounds. This contest was a tie-in to the show that was conducted in conjunction with The Biggest Loser during the broadcast of the Couples competition. Five couples were selected to represent the Million Pound Matchup at the Finale. Those couples include: winning couple, Marcus & Amber, Sonja & Aaron, Alice & Cynthia, Tara & Denise, and Gayle & Stephanie.

=== After the show ===
There was a second "Did They Keep The Weight Off" special, which featured more than 40 contestants from the first 7 seasons. Appearing on the episode included: Finalist Ali, and eliminated contestants Bette-Sue, Mark, Jay, Jackie, and Dan. (Roger Schultz's video update is viewable on the Biggest Loser website; he was not featured in the special.)
