= Rocco DiSpirito =

American chef

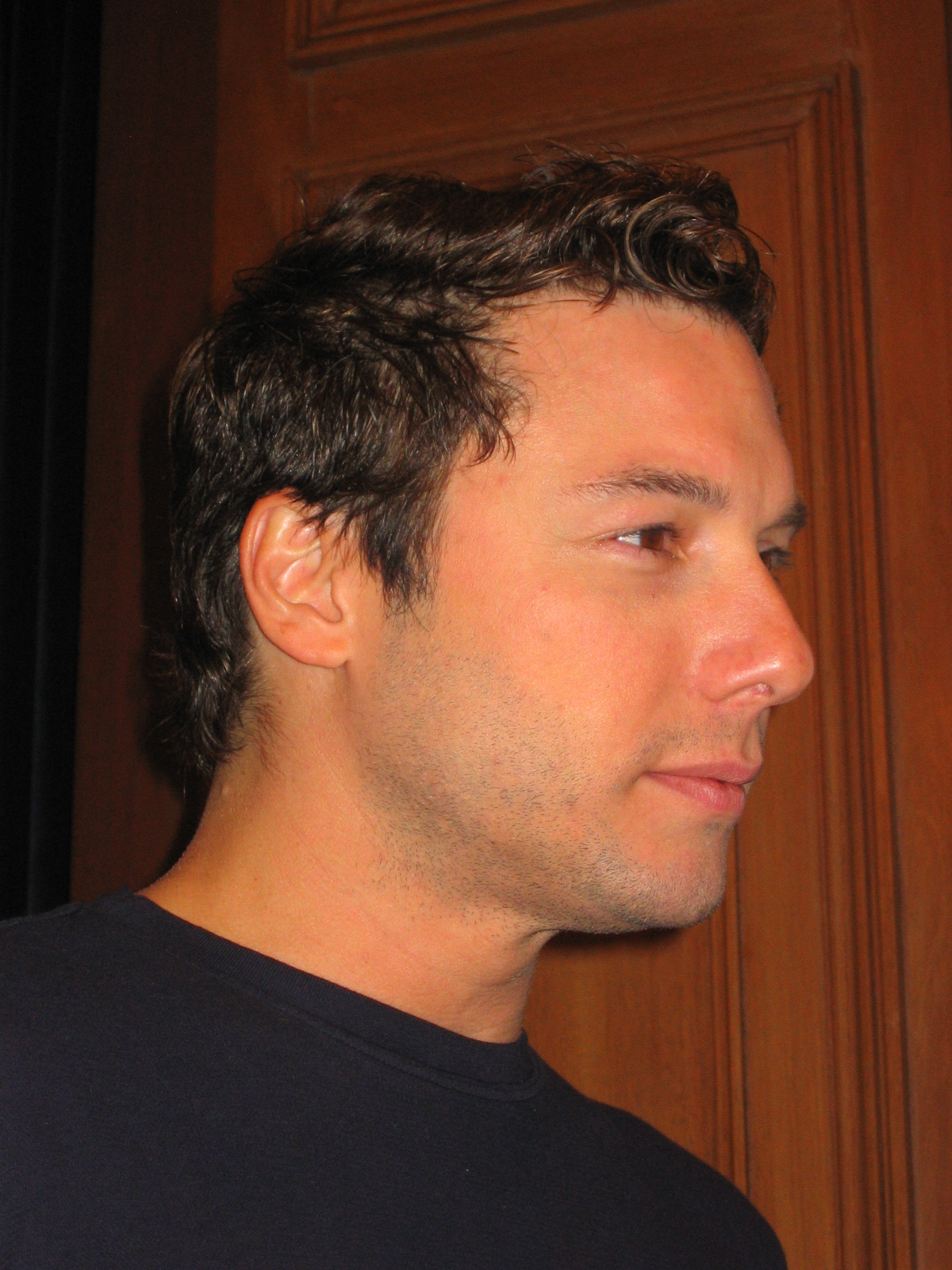
- Rocco DiSpirito in 2008
- Born: November 19, 1966 (age 60); Queens, New York, U.S.
- Education: Culinary Institute of America; Boston University
- Occupations: Chef, author
- Website: roccodispirito.com

Rocco DiSpirito (born November 19, 1966) is an American chef and reality television personality based in New York City, known for starring in the series The Restaurant.

== Early life and education ==
DiSpirito was born in Queens, New York to an Italian Immigrant mom originally from San Nicola Baronia who taught him to cook. He grew up in Jamaica, Queens.

He graduated in 1986 from the Culinary Institute of America in Hyde Park, New York, and in 1990 from Boston University with a bachelor's degree in hospitality administration.

== Career ==
DiSpirito is known for his Italian American cuisine and his fusion cooking.

DiSpirito is known as a celebrity chef and a cookbook author. He is known for his involvement in Union Pacific, a restaurant he opened in 1997 in the Gramercy Park section of Manhattan. A year later, New York Times reviewer Ruth Reichl, in a three-star review, reported that a woman at the next table was moaning in ecstasy as she ate. Still, it was impossible to determine what had provoked that reaction since so many dishes were worthy of such a reaction. DiSpirito departed Union Pacific in 2004.

From 2003 to 2004, DiSpirito starred in the NBC reality television show The Restaurant, which followed the launch and operation of a new Manhattan restaurant called Rocco's on 22nd. The show was canceled, and the restaurant's financier, Jeffrey Chodorow, successfully sued DiSpirito to have the restaurant shut down and DiSpirito banned from entering the premises.

DiSpirito succeeded Arthur Schwartz as host of Food Talk, an hour-long morning talk show on New York Radio WOR (AM), from October 2004 through December 2005, and then hosted 12 episodes of the TV show Rocco Gets Real on A&E (October 4 through December 27, 2008).

He was featured in a Lincoln MKX commercial and the ABC sitcom The Knights of Prosperity, and was a guest judge on Bravo's Top Chef.

DiSpirito returned in the Top Chef season three finale (Top Chef: Miami) — in which three celebrity chefs were brought to work as sous chefs to the contestants, with DiSpirito assisting Hung Huynh — and was a guest judge on the March 14, 2008, Top Chef season four premiere (Top Chef: Chicago).

He appeared on NBC's The Biggest Loser: Couples (season 5) in an episode that aired on February 5, 2008 (episode 506), in which contestants were challenged to prepare three healthy courses based on DiSpirito's recipes; DiSpirito judged the food and determined the winning team. The following season, he appeared on the second episode (airing September 23, 2008) of The Biggest Loser: Families, taking the "worst" cook of each pair shopping and teaching them to prepare healthy recipes.

DiSpirito was a contestant on season seven of Dancing with the Stars and was paired with professional ballroom dancer Karina Smirnoff. He was eliminated on the October 14, 2008, episode and placed ninth overall.

In 2006, DiSpirito performed a public service announcement for DoSomething to promote food drives for schools.

On May 3, 2010, DiSpirito appeared as himself on the ABC television series Castle in the episode "Food to Die For."

On June 15, 2011, DiSpirito debuted as host of a weekly reality TV cooking competition, Rocco's Dinner Party, on Bravo TV.

DiSpirito appeared as a celebrity contestant on the June 21, 2012, episode of the Fox dating game show The Choice.

DiSpirito hosted the syndicated television program Now Eat This! with Rocco Dispirito, which debuted on September 15, 2012.

In 2013, DiSpirito hosted the Food Network reality show Restaurant Divided, where he went to struggling restaurants where the owners had two differing visions and then picked which concept would save the restaurant.

On August 20, 2017, DiSpirito appeared on celebrity chef Guy Fieri's Guy's Grocery Games - Superstar Tournament Part 1, competing against other celebrity chefs for a $40,000 first prize donated to their chosen charity. DiSpirito made it to the finale and beat the previous tournament winner, Iron Chef Alex Guarnaschelli.

DiSpirito has appeared on Guy's Grocery Games and Tournament of Champions, both hosted by his friend Guy Fieri.

He has also made appearances on Guy's Ranch Kitchen.

After a lengthy hiatus as a restaurateur, DiSpirito returned to the kitchen in 2019 as the chef at the Standard Grill in New York City's Meatpacking District. In October 2019, it was announced that DiSpirito was no longer with the restaurant.

== Health ==
In 2015, DiSpirito underwent an emergency surgery, a discectomy, spinal surgery for his acute sciatica. The surgery left DiSpirito in a wheelchair while he learned to walk again.

== Awards ==
- James Beard Foundation Award for his book Flavor
- 1999, America's Best New Chef by Food & Wine magazine
- 2000, Most Exciting Young Chef by Gourmet magazine
- 2000, Nominated Best Chef: New York City by James Beard Foundation
- 2001, Nominated Best Chef: New York City by James Beard Foundation
- 2002, Sexiest Chef Alive by People
- 2003 Nominated Best Chef: New York City by James Beard Foundation
- 2004 Winner James Beard Award: Best Cookbook - Cooking From A Professional Point of View

== Cookbooks ==
- (2003, November 5) Flavor. Hyperion. (ISBN 0786868562)
- (2004, November 17) Rocco's Italian American. Hyperion. (ISBN 0786868570)
- (2005, December 6) Rocco's Five Minute Flavor: Fabulous Meals with 5 Ingredients in 5 Minutes. Scribner. (ISBN 0743273842)
- (2007, November 6) Rocco's Real Life Recipes: Fast Flavor for Everyday. Wiley. (ISBN 0696237032)
- (2008, October 21) Rocco Gets Real: Cook at Home, Every Day. Wiley. (ISBN 0696238233)
- (2010, March 2) Now Eat This!: 150 of America's Favorite Comfort Foods, All Under 350 Calories. Ballantine Books. (ISBN 0345520904)
- (2011, March 22) Now Eat This! Diet: Lose Up to 10 Pounds in Just 2 Weeks Eating 6 Meals a Day! Grand Central Life & Style. (ISBN 0446584495)
- (2012, September 25) Now Eat This! Italian: Favorite Dishes from the Real Mamas of Italy—All Under 350 Calories. Grand Central Life & Style. (ISBN 0446584517)
- (2014, January 7) The Pound a Day Diet: Lose Up to 5 Pounds in 5 Days by Eating the Foods You Love.
- (2016, January 28) The Negative Calorie Diet: Lose Up to 10 Pounds in 10 Days with 10 All You Can Eat Foods. HarperWave. (ISBN 0062378139)
- (2017, October 17) Rocco's Healthy & Delicious: More than 200 (Mostly) Plant-Based Recipes for Everyday Life.
- (2020, March 3) Rocco's Keto Comfort Food Diet: Eat the Foods You Miss and Still Lose Up to a Pound a Day.
- (2024, April 30) Everyday Delicious.
