= Ali Vincent =

American reality television participant

- Born: Alison Vincent
- Occupation(s): hairstylist fitness spokeswoman
- Known for: The Biggest Loser: Couples
- Website: www.alivincent.com

Alison "Ali" Vincent is the winner of the fifth United States season of the fitness reality television show The Biggest Loser, which aired in early 2008. Vincent's in-competition weight loss of 112 pounds earned her a $250,000 prize, and the first win by a female of a United States The Biggest Loser season. Vincent is to be featured as a spokeswoman in print and television advertisements for fitness center chain 24 Hour Fitness, Biggest Loser ProteinG manufactured by Designer Whey and Infinity Insurance.

In September 2011, Ali Vincent began hosting her own show, Live Big with Ali Vincent, a half-hour series on the Live Well Network. Besides lifestyle and motivation, the show offers advice on shopping, cooking, working out, etc. The show is produced at ABC-owned KABC-TV in Los Angeles.

Vincent revealed on December 5, 2016 that she had regained almost all of the weight she had lost. Vincent attributed this weight gain to emotional fallout from sexual assault.

== Personal life ==
Ali Vincent married her girlfriend Jennifer Krusing in Oakland, California in May 2015.

Vincent revealed on an episode of Oprah: Where Are They Now? that she had been sexually assaulted while getting a massage. She cites it as a reason for her subsequent weight gain after winning The Biggest Loser in 2008.
