= The Biggest Loser: Special Edition =

Season of television series

The Biggest Loser: Special Edition is a special edition of the NBC reality television series The Biggest Loser. The special edition began on January 4, 2006.

== Synopsis ==
In contrast to the regular series, the special edition typically consists of teams who already know each other, rather than strangers. The show is hosted by the comedian Caroline Rhea with Bob Harper and Jillian Michaels as the two personal trainers.

Instead of spending months at the ranch and then continuing to lose more weight at home, the special edition contestants spend only 11 days at the ranch and then return home for "several" months. At the end, all the contestants come back to be weighed for the final time and one team is declared the "Biggest Loser(s)".

== Episodes ==
=== Episode 1 ===
Name	Weight			Total	
Name	Start	Ranch	Final	lb	Percent
Samuels Family (Blue)
Don	243	218	188	55	22.63%
Melony	197	183	149	48	24.37%
Ravee	177	159	136	41	23.16%
Blue Team Total	617	562	473	144	23.34%
Muha Family (Red)
Otto	259	234	170	89	34.36%
Shaun	232	214	154	78	33.62%
Erica	233	218	181	52	22.32%
Red Team Total	724	666	505	219	30.25%

The Muha Family vs. The Samuels Family

- Red team working with Jillian: Otto Muha, Erica Muha, and Shaun Muha
- Blue team working with Bob: Don Samuels, Melony Samuels, and Ravee Samuels
- The Muha family wins the ice cream challenge and wins a computer, digital camera, and printer.
- The Muha family wins the pop quiz and wins a $2,500 shopping spree.
- By winning the weigh-in at the ranch, the Samuels family wins a 5-day trip to a spa.
- The Muha family wins the final weigh-in and $50,000 cash.

=== Episode 2 ===
Name	Weight			Total	
Name	Start	Ranch	Final	lb	Percent
Edwin & Rasha (Blue)
Edwin	240	214	177	63	26.25%
Rasha	237	222	167	70	29.54%
Blue Team Total	477	436	344	133	27.88%
Steve & Sarah (Red)
Steve	274	244	181	93	33.94%
Sarah	297	272	220	77	25.93%
Red Team Total	571	520	381	170	29.77%

Engaged Couple vs. Engaged Couple

- Red team working with Jillian: Steve Rothermel and Sarah Eberwein
- Blue team working with Bob: Edwin Chapman and Rasha Spindel
- Steve & Sarah Win Limo Challenge winning $5000 and a chef for a week.
- Steve & Sarah Win first weight-in losing 55 lb lost total to the Blue Teams 41 lb. Winning a Honeymoon trip to Jamaica.
- Steve & Sarah Wins Final Weigh-in losing 170 lb total to the Blue Teams 133 lb. Winning $50,000 for a Dream Wedding.

=== Episode 3 ===
Name	Weight			Total	
Name	Start	Ranch	Final	lb	Percent
Senti Family (Blue)
Scott	265	242	183	82	30.94%
Tammy	215	201	161	54	25.12%
Kelly	211	199	169	42	19.91%
Emily	250	229	186	64	25.6%
Blue Team Total	941	871	699	242	25.71%
Sapienza Family (Red)
Robert	276	258	197	79	28.62%
Toni	213	204	190	23	10.79%
Daniela	163	152	121	42	25.76%
Alexa	191	183	166	25	13.08%
Red Team Total	843	797	674	169	20.05%

The Senti Family (50s Diner) vs. The Sapienzas Family (Little Italy)

- Red team working with Jillian: Alexa Sapienza, Toni Sapienza, Robert Sapienza, and Daniela Sapienza
- Blue team working with Bob: Scott Senti, Tammy Senti, Kelly Wilcox, and Emily Senti
- The Senti family wins the Treadmill Challenge and is able to work out with Bob for an additional week.
- By winning the weigh-in at the ranch, the Senti family wins a vacation to a resort.
- The Senti family wins the final weigh in and $50,000.

=== Episode 4 ===
Name	Weight			Total	
Name	Start	Ranch	Final	lb	Percent
Bruce & Kimberly (Red)
Bruce	267	244	173	94	35.21%
Kimberly	215	201	155	60	27.91%
Red Team Total	482	445	328	154	31.95%
Nick & Lael (Blue)
Lael	164	147	121	43	26.22%
Nick	251	224	183	68	27.09%
Blue Team Total	415	371	304	111	26.74%

Engaged Couple vs. Engaged Couple

- Red team working with Jillian: Bruce and Kimberly
- Blue team working with Bob: Nick and Lael
- Bruce & Kimberly win the Temptation Challenge, and as a result they win a video camera.
- Nick & Lael win the Wedding Cake Challenge, and as a result they win a personal chef for a month.
- Nick & Lael win first weight-in losing 44 lb lost total to the Read Teams 37 lb, and as a result they won a honeymoon trip to Jamaica.
- Bruce & Kimberly win the Final Weigh-in losing 154 lb total to the Blue Teams 111 lb. Winning $50,000 for a Dream Wedding.

=== Episode 5 ===
Name	Weight			Total	
Name	Start	Ranch	Final	lb	Percent
Marine Wives (Red)
Amanda	248	233	182	66	26.61%
Amber	157	151	144	13	8.28%
Rosalina	190	179	170	20	10.53%
Sharon	208	196	182	26	12.5%
Red Team Total	803	759	678	125	15.56%
Navy Wives (Blue)
Dari	241	225	196	45	18.67%
Jessica	217	203	179	38	17.5%
Tami	194	185	157	37	19.07%
Tina	200	192	169	31	15.5%
Blue Team Total	852	805	701	151	17.72%

Marine Wives vs Navy Wives

- Red team working with Jillian: Amanda, Amber, Rosalina, Sharon
- Blue team working with Bob: Dari, Jessica, Tami and Tina
- Neither team competed in the Temptation Challenge. Nobody won because it's a tie.
- The Marine wives win the Military Challenge.
- By winning the weigh-in at the ranch, the Navy wives win an extra week of training with Bob prior to the final weigh in
- The Navy Wives win the final weigh in and $50,000.

=== Episode 6 ===
Name	Weight			Total	
Name	Start	Ranch	Final	lb	Percent
Tofanellis (Red)
Amy	238	223	179	59	24.79%
Sue	170	150	129	41	24.12%
Steve	368	344	258	110	29.89%
Tony	275	247	187	88	32%
Red Team Total	1051	964	753	298	28.35%
Stephens (Blue)
Al	239	220	200	39	16.32%
Amelia	210	194	168	42	20%
Anita	236	214	184	52	22.03%
Ashley	222	205	170	52	23.42%
Blue Team Total	907	833	722	185	20.4%

Tofannelis vs Stephens

- Red team working with Jillian: Amy, Sue, Steve, and Tony
- Blue team working with Bob: Al, Amelia, Anita, and Ashley
- Both teams competed in the Temptation Challenge. Red Team won $1,000 and a laptop.
- The Red Team won the Challenge, along with four mountain bikes.
- By winning the weigh-in at the ranch, the Red team got a vacation.
- The Red Team won the final weigh in and $50,000.
- This episode never aired on NBC in the USA. It was available online only, and then aired on Style.
