= Olivia Ward =

American opera singer

- Born: Olivia Curlee; October 23, 1975 (age 51); Pascagoula, Mississippi
- Occupations: Cycle instructor and website manager
- Known for: The Biggest Loser Winner
- Website: https://myfitspiration.com

Olivia Ward (born October 23, 1975) is an American reality television personality and the winner of season 11 of The Biggest Loser, which was the fourth season of couples on the TV reality show. Ward competed on the purple team alongside her sister, Hannah Curlee, in which they became the final two together.

== Early life and education ==
She was born in Pascagoula, Mississippi. She is the eldest of four siblings. Her family subsequently moved to Houston, Texas, where she attended Langham Creek High School though her junior year. She spent her senior year at, and graduated from, Baker High School in Mobile County, Alabama in 1994. Ward earned a degree in vocal performance from the University of Alabama in Tuscaloosa in 1998. She earned master's degrees in voice and in opera performance from the New England Conservatory in Boston, Massachusetts in 2002.

== Career ==
Ward has worked as a manager at a plastic surgery office.

=== The Biggest Loser ===
Ward's motivation for being on The Biggest Loser was the fact that her weight, which had climbed to over 261 pounds, combined with a diagnosis of polyendocrine metabolic ovarian syndrome (PMOS), meant she would likely never have children if she didn't lose a significant amount of weight. She felt her obesity was a reason she had not received many opera singing roles. Her teammate was her sister Hannah Curlee, who is three years younger than she. Ward won the Biggest Loser Season 11 on May 24, 2011 and Hannah placed second.

=== Other ===
As of 2018, Ward is an Atlanta-based Senior Instructor at SoulCycle.

As of 2013, Ward operates a website called MyFitspiration.com.

=== Opera ===
Ward was a mezzo-soprano opera singer. Ward's operatic work includes appearances with Ash-Lawn Highland Opera, Chautauqua Opera, Las Vegas Opera, Mobile Opera, Nashville Opera Association, and Nevada Opera. She appeared in the Music City Community Chorus and in their Operalooza! in Nashville, Tennessee. She appeared in the Nashville Symphony, Virginia Symphony Orchestra, and the Chattanooga Symphony and Opera. By 2007, she had begun attracting regional operatic and orchestral attention. Ward played Mrs. Baines in the opera Elmer Gantry.

== Personal life ==
She currently resides in Atlanta with her husband Ben, whom she married soon after she graduated from college in 1998.
