= Caleb Hammer =

American YouTuber

- Born: February 14, 1995 (age 31); Kalamazoo, Michigan, U.S.
- Education: Western Michigan University
- Occupation: Social media influencer

TikTok information
- Page: Caleb Hammer
- Followers: 3.3 million

YouTube information
- Channel: CalebHammer
- Genre: Finance
- Subscribers: 3.94 million
- Views: 4.86 billion
- Last updated: May 17, 2026
- Website: calebhammer.com

Caleb Joshua Hammer (born February 14, 1995) is an American YouTuber best known for hosting Financial Audit, a show analyzing guests' personal finance habits. As of 2026, the show has millions of subscribers.

== Early life and education ==
Hammer was born in Kalamazoo, Michigan and raised in Portage, Michigan. He describes his family life as average and not having a lot of money. He briefly studied music composition at Western Michigan University, but dropped out after his YouTube channel began to take off.

== Career ==
In 2022, Hammer started posting his show, Financial Audit, to YouTube. The show analyzes guests' bank statements and debts to challenge their spending habits. Within a year, his channel garnered over 360,000 subscribers, and his TikTok account hosting clips of the show grew to 250,000 followers. By November 2025, the channel had accumulated two billion views and become the biggest membership channel on the platform. In the same month, Caleb Hammer signed with the Creative Artists Agency.

Financial Audit hosted an appearance by Michigan governor Gretchen Whitmer. The interview covered Michigan's debt, food stamps, and her own political leanings.

According to Ashley Carman writing for Bloomberg, Hammer is known for vocally berating his guests for their financial habits. She described his style of content as "an amalgamation of everything the internet seemingly loves: very online problems (OnlyFans subscriptions), public flogging (a la Kill Tony) and framing that makes somewhat routine financial issues seem more scandalous than they actually are". Guests are vetted beforehand for interesting life stories, use fake names, and are compensated for travelling to his filming location in Austin, Texas.

Hammer has another channel called Front Page that was created in January 2024 and repurposed in February 2026. In September 2026, he signed a deal with Red Seat Ventures as Financial Audit's exclusive audio and video advertising sales partner.

== Personal life ==
As of 2026, Hammer resides in Austin, Texas.
