= Kim Lyons =

American athlete, personal trainer, nutritionist, and fitness model

Kimberly Lyn Lyons (born May 5, 1973) is an American athlete, personal trainer, nutritionist, and fitness model. She has appeared several times on the covers of many health and fitness magazines. She has also starred on the United States version of the competitive reality television show, The Biggest Loser. She originally replaced fellow trainer Jillian Michaels in season 3, but competed against her in season 4. She did not return for season 5, and has not made an appearance since. Subsequently, she appeared at the 2008 Miss America pageant as a panelist, and wrote a book entitled Kim Lyons: Your Body, Your Life.

== Background ==
Initially intending to become an airline pilot, she attended Colorado State University and instead majored in Human Development and Nutrition (she decided to change her major because of her "love and passion for health and fitness"). After her graduation in 1995, she began teaching aerobics, which led to her competing in the famous Galaxy Fitness competition, and in 2002, she earned her Pro Card as an IFBB (International Federation of Bodybuilding and fitness) fitness athlete. She is also a model who poses in pageants, and has appeared on many magazine covers.

There were only two times in her life when she was unable to be physically fit and active. Before she began teaching aerobics, she was considerably overweight because she struggled with depression, which she managed to conquer by exercising. Later, while preparing for a fitness competition, she tore her Achilles tendon, and needed seven months to recover, during which time she became a health and fitness expert.

Kim resides in Hermosa Beach, California, and married German bodybuilder Gunter Schlierkamp in March 2007. She was previously married to an F-16 pilot. On June 3, 2010, Kim and husband Gunter had their first child together, a boy named Jake Alexander.

== Other media appearances ==
Kim Lyons was chosen as a personal trainer to be in Dr. Phil's Ultimate Weight Loss Race in his 7th season.

Kim Lyons was on American Ninja Warrior, but failed on the quintuple steps. She competed in the Venice Qualifiers.
