= The Biggest Loser season 11 =

The Biggest Loser
- Season 11
- No. of episodes: 21

Release
- Original network: NBC
- Original release: January 4 – May 24, 2011

Season chronology
- ← Previous; Season 10 (Pay It Forward) Next → Season 12 (Battle of the Ages)

The Biggest Loser: Couples 4 is the eleventh season of the NBC reality television series entitled The Biggest Loser. The contestants competed to win a $250,000 prize, which was awarded to Olivia Ward, the contestant with the highest percentage of weight loss. It premiered on January 4, 2011. Along with existing trainers Bob Harper and Jillian Michaels, two new trainers (Cara Castronuova and Brett Hoebel) will be featured who were revealed in Week 3. One of the featured contestants is Rulon Gardner, a former gold medalist at the 2000 Summer Olympics. It was the longest season in Biggest Loser history at 20 weeks long. This season is the second, after Pay It Forward, to be filmed in high definition. This season marks the first time in USA Biggest Loser history that a contestant left the show by choice. As well, for the first time in The Biggest Loser history, a couple has made the finale together. And, for the first time in The Biggest Loser history, all 3 finalists are women.

== Contestants ==
Name	Couples Team	Black vs. Red 1	Black vs. Red 2	4 Teams	Status	Total votes
Leann Jackson, 52, Ogden, UT	White Team				Eliminated Week 13	^{[E1]}
Vance Jackson, 19, Ogden, UT	White Team				Eliminated Week 13	^{[E1]}
Ana Alvarado, 50, Portland, OR	Orange Team				Eliminated Week 1	3
† Dan Evans, 54, Oklahoma City, OK	Black Team				Eliminated Week 3	1
Don Evans, 54, Oklahoma City, OK	Black Team				Eliminated Week 4	4
Larialmy Allen, 26, Columbia, SC	Red Team				Eliminated Week 5	3
Jaquin "Q" Allen, 27, Columbia, SC	Red Team	Red Team			Eliminated Week 6	5
Jay Jacobs, Returned Week 12	Green Team	Red Team			Eliminated Week 7	4
Denise "Deni" Hill, 59, Bountiful, UT	Pink Team	Black Team			Eliminated Week 8	^{[R]}
Jesse Wornum, 61, Portland, OR	Blue Team	Black Team			Eliminated Week 8	6
Arthur Wornum, 34, Portland, OR	Blue Team	Black Team	Red Team		Eliminated Week 9	4
Sarah Nitta, 27, Las Vegas, NV	Pink Team	Black Team	Black Team		Eliminated Week 10	5
Marci Crozier, 49, Valparaiso, IN	Aqua Team	Black Team	Black Team		Eliminated Week 11	6
Justin Pope, 39, Logan, UT	Yellow Team	Red Team	Red Team	Red Team	Eliminated Week 12	5
Jennifer 'Jen' Jacobs , 28, Long Branch, NJ	Green Team	Red Team	Black Team	Red Team>	Eliminated Week 13	^{[E2]}
Courtney Crozier, 21, Valparaiso, IN	Aqua Team	Black Team	Black Team	Red Team	Eliminated Week 14	^{[Auto]}
Moses Kinikini, 47, Shelley, ID	Gray Team	Red Team	Red Team	Blue Team	Eliminated Week 15	4
Ken Andrews , 49, Pasadena, CA	Brown Team	Red Team	Red Team	Green Team	Eliminated Week 16	3
Rulon Gardner, 39, Logan, UT	Yellow Team	Red Team	Red Team	Black Team	Quit Week 17	^{[E3]}
Kaylee Kinikini, 20, Shelley, ID	Gray Team	Red Team	Red Team	Green Team	Eliminated Week 17	2
Austin Andrews, 21, Pasadena, CA	Brown Team	Red Team	Red Team	Green Team	Eliminated Week 19	2
Jay Jacobs, 53, West Orange, NJ	Green Team	Red Team		Black Team	America's Vote Victim	
Irene Alvarado, 26, Portland, OR	Orange Team	Black Team	Black Team	Blue Team	2nd Runner-Up	
Hannah Curlee, 32, Nashville, TN	Purple Team	Black Team	Black Team	Black Team	Runner-Up	
Olivia Ward, 35, New York City, NY	Purple Team	Black Team	Black Team	Blue Team	Biggest Loser	

The "Total Votes" column indicates the number of votes cast against the contestant when he/she was eliminated.
^[Auto] This contestant was automatically eliminated being the last one standing on their trainer's team without any votes.
^[R] This contestant fell below the Red Line and was eliminated without any votes.
^[E1] This contestant was part of a team sent home pre-game. The team was given a chance to enter the game in week 13, but lost the challenge and were eliminated.
^[E2] This contestant lost a weigh-in and was eliminated without any votes.
^[E3] This contestant withdrew from the competition.

== Weigh-ins ==
Contestants are listed in reverse chronological order of elimination.

Contestant	Age	Height	Starting BMI	Ending BMI	Starting Weight	Week																					Weight Lost	Percentage Lost
Contestant	Age	Height	Starting BMI	Ending BMI	Starting Weight	1	2	3	4	5	6	7	8	9	10	11	12	13	14	15	16	17	18	19	20	Finale	Weight Lost	Percentage Lost
Olivia	35	5'9"	38.5	19.5	261	245	239	233	228	224	208	206	202	190	188	185	180	176	174	172	168	162	158	153	149	132	129	49.42%
Hannah	32	5'8"	37.7	19.5	248	232	226	220	217	210	201	194	193	182	180	176	172	172	168	164	161	156	154	150	146	128	120	48.39%
Irene	26	5'3"	45.2	24.6	255	242	232	224	230	216	204	198	195	185	180	178	173	170	164	161	157	154	152	147	144	139	116	45.49%
Jay	53	5'11"	55.8	30.5	400	374	364	350	341	331	317	308				289	282	276	270	272	265	258	255	246	242	219	181	45.25%
Austin	21	6'1"	52.2	29.3	396	369	362	347	342	326	316	306	299	289	283	275	272	265	263	255	250	243	236	235		222	174	43.94%
Kaylee	20	5'5"	38.8	29.8	233	218	214	209	204	195	190	187	180	179	174	176	174	169	168	172	163	165				179	54	23.17%
Rulon	39	6'2"	60.9	X	474	442	425	415	411	394	382	371	367	350	342	335	330	325	318	311	301	WD				did not attend		
Ken	49	5'11"	52.6	30.5	377	364	357	344	335	321	307	296	291	286	277	270	263	257	253	247	243					219	158	41.90%
Moses	47	6'0"	59.7	38.9	440	399	387	376	365	351	340	333	322	317	309	303	300	293	286	286						287	153	34.77%
Courtney	21	5'7"	50.6	33.4	323	308	298	292	282	275	265	258	256	246	241	237	234	232	231							213	110	34.06%
Jen	28	5'10"	39.9	23.5	278	258	250	242	236	232	218	211	213	197	196	191	187	187								164	114	41.01%
Justin	39	6'3"	45.6	24.0	365	338	326	316	308	292	282	277	270	262	254	249	247									192	173	47.40%
Marci	49	5'8"	36.2	23.1	238	224	218	211	208	200	187	181	182	167	162	162										152	86	36.13%
Sarah	27	5'5"	43.4	25.8	261	247	243	235	231	222	212	208	204	194	190											155	106	40.61%
Arthur	34	5'8"	77.1	52.3	507	476	463	459	450	444	435	415	406	390												344	163	32.15%
Jesse	61	5'8"	44.6	31.9	293	286	278	269	266	257	246	238	241													210	83	28.33%
Deni	59	5'6"	41.3	21.1	256	237	233	224	221	210	201	196	204													131	125	48.83%
Q	27	6'1"	57.7	45.4	437	426	420	401	398	385	378															344	93	21.28%
Larialmy	26	5'7"	47.1	34.0	301	289	283	275	270	259																217	84	27.91%
Don	54	5'6"	49.9	28.9	309	288	280	289	286																	179	130	42.07%
Dan	54	5'6"	46.3	26.3	287	268	263	272																		163	124	43.21%
Ana	50	5'3"	45.2	25.9	255	246																				146	109	42.75%
Leann	52	5'11"	43.9	34.9	315												270									251	64	20.32%
Vance	19	6'0"	51.4	41.4	379												349									305	74	19.53%

Standings
Week's Biggest Loser (Team or Individuals)
Week's Biggest Loser & Immunity
Immunity (Challenge or Weigh-In)
Last person eliminated before the finale
Results from At-Home players
Contestant withdrew before weigh-in

BMI
Underweight (less than 18.5 BMI)
Normal (18.5 – 24.9 BMI)
Overweight (25 – 29.9 BMI)
Obese Class I (30 – 34.9 BMI)
Obese Class II (35 – 39.9 BMI)
Obese Class III (greater than 40 BMI)

Winners
$250,000 Winner (among the finalists)
$100,000 Winner (among the eliminated contestants)

=== Weigh-in difference history ===
Contestant	Week																				
Contestant	1	2	3	4	5	6	7	8	9	10	11	12	13	14	15	16	17	18	19	20	Finale
Olivia	−16	−6	−6	−5	−4	−16	−2	−4	−12	−2	−3	−5	−4	−2	−2	−4	−6	−4	−5	−4	−17
Hannah	−16	−6	−6	−3	−7	−9	−7	−1	−11	−2	−4	−4	0	−4	−4	−3	−5	−2	−4	−4	−18
Irene	−13	−10	−8	+6	−14	−12	−6	−3	−10	−5	−2	−5	−3	−6	−3	−4	−3	−2	−5	−3	−5
Jay	−26	−10	−14	−9	−10	−14	−9	-19				−7	−6	−6	+2	−7	−7	−3	−9	−4	-23
Austin	−27	−7	−15	−5	−16	−10	−10	−7	−10	−6	−8	−3	−7	−2	−8	−5	−7	−7	−1	-13	
Kaylee	−15	−4	−5	−5	−9	−5	−3	−7	−1	−5	+2	−2	−5	−1	+4	−9	+2	+14			
Rulon	−32	−17	−10	−4	−17	−12	−11	−4	−17	−8	−7	−5	−5	−7	−7	−10	WD	X			
Ken	−13	−7	−13	−9	−14	−14	−11	−5	−5	−9	−7	−7	−6	−4	−6	−4	-24				
Moses	−41	−12	−11	−11	−14	−11	−7	−11	−5	−8	−6	−3	−7	−7	0	+1					
Courtney	−15	−10	−6	−10	−7	−10	−7	−2	−10	−5	−4	−3	−2	−1	-18						
Jennifer	−20	−8	−8	−6	−4	−14	−7	+2	−16	−1	−5	−4	0	-23							
Justin	−27	−12	−10	−8	−16	−10	−5	−7	−8	−8	−5	−2	-55								
Marci	−14	−6	−7	−3	−8	−13	−6	+1	−15	−5	0	-10									
Sarah	−14	−4	−8	−4	−9	−10	−4	−4	−10	−4	-35										
Arthur	−31	−13	−4	−9	−6	−9	−20	−9	−16	-46											
Jesse	−7	−8	−9	−3	−9	−11	−8	+3	-31												
Deni	−19	−4	−9	−3	−11	−9	−5	+8	-73												
Q	−11	−6	−19	−3	−13	−7	-34														
Larialmy	−12	−6	−8	−5	−11	-42															
Don	−21	−8	+9	−3	-107																
Dan	−19	−5	+9	-109																	
Ana	−9	-100																			
Leann	-45													-19							
Vance	-30													-44							

Notes

- Don's 3 pound weight loss in week 4 was displayed as a +6 due to his weight gain the previous week.
- Irene's 14 pound weight loss in week 5 was displayed as −8 due to her weight gain the previous week.
- Jen's 16 pound weight loss in week 9 was displayed as −14 due to her weight gain the previous week.
- Marci's 15 pound weight loss in week 9 was displayed as −14 due to her weight gain the previous week.
- Kaylee's 2 pound weight loss in week 12 was displayed as 0 due to her weight gain the previous week.
- Jay's 7 pound weight loss in Week 16 was displayed as −5 due to his weight gain the previous week.
- Kaylee's 9 pound weight loss in week 16 was displayed as −5 due to her weight gain the previous week.

=== Weigh-in percentages history ===
Contestant	Week																				
Contestant	1	2	3	4	5	6	7	8	9	10	11	12	13	14	15	16	17	18	19	20	Finale
Olivia	−6.13%	−2.45%	−2.51%	−2.15%	−1.75%	−7.14%	−0.96%	−1.94%	−5.94%	−1.05%	−1.60%	−2.70%	−2.22%	−1.14%	−1.15%	−2.33%	−3.57%	−2.47%	−3.16%	−2.61%	−11.41%
Hannah	−6.45%	−2.59%	−2.65%	−1.36%	−3.23%	−4.29%	−3.48%	−0.52%	−5.70%	−1.10%	−2.22%	−2.27%	0.00%	−2.33%	−2.38%	−1.83%	−3.11%	−1.28%	−2.60%	−2.67%	−12.33%
Irene	−5.10%	−4.13%	−3.45%	+2.68%	−6.09%	−5.56%	−2.94%	−1.52%	−5.13%	−2.70%	−1.11%	−2.81%	−1.73%	−3.53%	−1.83%	−2.48%	−1.91%	−1.30%	−3.29%	−2.04%	−3.47%
Jay	−6.50%	−2.67%	−3.85%	−2.57%	−2.93%	−4.23%	−2.84%	-6.17%				−2.42%	−2.13%	−2.17%	+0.74%	−2.57%	−2.64%	−1.16%	−3.53%	−1.63%	−9.50%
Austin	−6.82%	−1.90%	−4.14%	−1.44%	−4.68%	−3.07%	−3.16%	−2.29%	−3.34%	−2.08%	−2.83%	−1.09%	−2.57%	−0.75%	−3.04%	−1.96%	−2.80%	−2.88%	−0.85%	-5.53%	
Kaylee	−6.44%	−1.83%	−2.34%	−2.39%	−4.41%	−2.56%	−1.58%	−3.74%	−0.56%	−2.79%	+1.15%	−1.14%	−2.87%	−0.59%	+2.38%	−5.23%	+1.23%	+8.48%			
Rulon	−6.75%	−3.85%	−2.35%	−0.96%	−4.14%	−3.05%	−2.88%	−1.08%	−4.63%	−2.29%	−2.05%	−1.49%	−1.52%	−2.15%	−2.20%	−3.22%	WD	X			
Ken	−3.45%	−1.92%	−3.64%	−2.62%	−4.18%	−4.36%	−3.58%	−1.69%	−1.72%	−3.15%	−2.53%	−2.59%	−2.28%	−1.56%	−2.37%	−1.62%	-9.88%				
Moses	−9.32%	−3.01%	−2.84%	−2.93%	−3.84%	−3.13%	−2.06%	−3.30%	−1.55%	−2.52%	−1.94%	−0.99%	−2.33%	−2.39%	0.00%	+0.35%					
Courtney	−4.64%	−3.25%	−2.01%	−3.42%	−2.48%	−3.64%	−2.64%	−0.78%	−3.91%	−2.03%	−1.66%	−1.27%	−0.85%	−0.43%	-7.79%						
Jennifer	−7.19%	−3.10%	−3.20%	−2.48%	−1.69%	−6.03%	−3.21%	+0.95%	−7.51%	−0.52%	−2.55%	−2.09%	0.00%	-12.30%							
Justin	−7.40%	−3.55%	−3.07%	−2.53%	−5.19%	−3.42%	−1.77%	−2.53%	−2.96%	−3.05%	−1.97%	−0.80%	-22.27%								
Marci	−5.88%	−2.68%	−3.21%	−1.42%	−3.85%	−6.50%	−3.21%	+0.55%	−8.24%	−2.99%	0.00%	-6.17%									
Sarah	−5.36%	−1.62%	−3.29%	−1.70%	−3.90%	−4.50%	−1.89%	−1.92%	−4.90%	−2.06%	-18.42%										
Arthur	−6.11%	−2.73%	−0.86%	−1.96%	−1.33%	−2.03%	−4.60%	−2.17%	−3.94%	-11.79%											
Jesse	−2.39%	−2.80%	−3.24%	−1.12%	−3.38%	−4.28%	−3.25%	+1.26%	-12.86%												
Deni	−7.42%	−1.69%	−3.86%	−1.34%	−4.98%	−4.29%	−2.49%	+4.08%	-35.78%												
Q	−2.52%	−1.41%	−4.52%	−0.75%	−3.27%	−1.82%	-8.99%														
Larialmy	−3.99%	−2.08%	−2.83%	−1.82%	−4.07%	-16.22%															
Don	−6.80%	−2.78%	+3.21%	−1.04%	-37.41%																
Dan	−6.62%	−1.87%	+3.42%	-40.07%																	
Ana	−3.53%	-40.65%																			
Leann	-14.29%												-7.04%								
Vance	-7.92%												-12.61%								

Notes

- Don's 1.04% weight loss in week 4 was displayed as +2.14% due to his weight gain the previous week.
- Irene's 6.09% weight loss in week 5 was displayed as −3.57% due to her weight gain the previous week.
- Jen's 7.51% weight loss in week 9 was displayed as −6.64% due to her weight gain the previous week.
- Marci's 8.24% weight loss in week 9 was displayed as −7.73% due to her weight gain the previous week.
- Kaylee's 1.14% weight loss in week 12 was displayed as 0.00% due to her weight gain the previous week.
- Jay's 2.57% weight loss in week 16 was displayed as −1.85% due to his weight gain the previous week.
- Kaylee's 5.23% weight loss in week 16 was displayed as −2.98% due to her weight gain the previous week.

== Elimination history ==
Name	Week #																			
Name	1	2	3	4	5	6	7	8	9	10	11	12	13	14	15	16	17	18	19	Finale
Eliminated	Ana	None	Dan	Don	Larialmy	Q	Jay	Deni, Jesse	Arthur	Sarah	Marci	Justin	Jennifer	Courtney	Moses	Ken	Rulon, Kaylee	None	Austin	Jay
Olivia	Irene	X	X	Don	X	X	X	Jesse	X	Sarah	Marci	Justin	X	X	X	Ken	Kaylee	X	Austin	Biggest Loser
Hannah	Irene	X	X	Don	X	X	X	Jesse	X	Sarah	Marci	?	X	X	Moses	X	Kaylee	X	X	Runner-up
Irene	X	X	Dan	X	X	X	X	Jesse	X	Sarah	Marci	?	X	X	X	Ken	X	X	?	X
Jay	Ana	X	X	Don	X	Q	Rulon	Eliminated Week 7; Returned Week 12				?	X	X	Moses	Ken	?	X	Austin	Re-eliminated
Austin	X	X	X	X	?	?	Jay	X	?	X	?	Justin	X	X	Moses	Hannah	Irene	X	X	Eliminated Week 19
Kaylee	X	X	X	X	Larialmy	?	Jay	X	Arthur	X	X	Justin	X	X	Olivia	Hannah	X	Eliminated Week 17		
Rulon	X	X	X	X	Larialmy	?	Jay	X	Arthur	X	Marci	Courtney	X	X	Olivia	?	WD	Withdrew Week 17		
Ken	X	X	X	X	?	Q	?	X	?	X	?	Justin	X	X	Moses	X	Eliminated Week 16			
Moses	X	X	X	X	Larialmy	Q	Jay	X	Arthur	X	Marci	Justin	X	X	X	Eliminated Week 15				
Courtney	Ana	X	X	Don	X	X	X	Jesse	X	Sarah	Kaylee	X	X	X	Eliminated Week 14					
Jennifer	Ana	X	X	Don	X	Q	Kaylee	X	X	Sarah	Kaylee	X	X	Eliminated Week 13						
Justin	X	X	X	X	Larialmy	Q	?	X	Arthur	X	Marci	X	Eliminated Week 12							
Marci	Ana	X	X	Don	X	X	X	Jesse	X	Olivia	X	Eliminated Week 11								
Sarah	X	X	X	X	Larialmy	X	X	Jesse	X	Jennifer	Eliminated Week 10									
Arthur	Ana	X	X	Don	X	X	X	?	Ken	Eliminated Week 9										
Jesse	Ana	X	X	Don	X	X	X	?	Eliminated Week 8											
Deni	X	X	X	X	Larialmy	X	X	X	Eliminated Week 8											
Q	X	X	X	X	X	Jay	Eliminated Week 6													
Larialmy	X	X	X	X	X	Eliminated Week 5														
Don	?	X	X	X	Eliminated Week 4															
Dan	?	X	X	Eliminated Week 3																
Ana	X	Eliminated Week 1																		

X Not in house for vote
Immunity
? Immunity, vote not revealed
X Immunity, was below yellow line or not in elimination, unable to vote
X Below yellow line, unable to vote
X Below red line or last player on a trainer's team, automatically eliminated
X Lost White Team vs. Kaylee weigh-in, was automatically eliminated
X Unable to vote due to only one player being eligible for elimination
X Not in elimination, unable to vote
X Unable to vote due to single-player losing the weigh-in.
WD This player withdrew from the competition.
Eliminated or not in house
Last person eliminated (at the finale) via public voting
Valid vote cast
? Vote not revealed
$250,000 winner (among the finalists)
X Below yellow line, America's vote.

== Weekly summaries ==
=== Week 1 ===
First aired January 4, 2011
All couples weighed in as teams. Arthur (Blue team) weighed in at 507 pounds, the heaviest contestant of the season, and the second-heaviest overall, second only to Season 9's Michael, who weighed 526 pounds. (Arthur said that he weighed nearly 650 pounds at one point before losing over 100 pounds on his own.) Courtney (Aqua team) was the heaviest female; she, too, had lost over 100 pounds on her own. Rulon (Yellow team) weighed 474 pounds and stated that to go from being an Olympic gold medalist to this was an embarrassment.

The eleven couples competed in their first day's challenge, which would determine the choice between training with Bob and Jillian or spending their first four weeks being trained by mystery trainers(Brett Hoebel & Cara Castronova) outside the ranch. Five teams would train with the mystery trainers (and would enjoy the luxury of four weeks of immunity) while the other six would train with Bob and Jillian at the ranch, with the risk of normal weekly elimination.

The Yellow team won the contest and chose the mystery trainers, as did the Gray, Pink, Brown, and Red teams (finished second, fifth, sixth, and eighth, respectively). Aqua and Purple finished third and fourth, respectively (as well as Green), but chose to stay with the "proven" style of Bob and Jillian; Bob and Jillian were not happy that the teams forsook immunity. The remaining teams (Orange, Blue, and Black) were assigned to Bob and Jillian.

Only one scene from the mystery training camp was shown, and the trainers' faces were not revealed (though small tidbits of their background were mentioned); the majority of the show focused on Bob and Jillian's training.

At the weigh-in, it was revealed that Moses (Grey team, mystery trainers) lost a show-record 41 pounds in the first week of training, while the team that lost the most pounds was the Yellow Team (32 pounds from Rulon and 27 pounds from Justin). The Green team finished with the highest percentage of weight loss; the Orange team fell below the yellow line. The other teams voted to send Ana home.

At home, Ana showed that she had lost 50 pounds and was becoming more active on the social scene (including salsa dancing, her favorite activity); her goal is to lose 100 pounds before the season's conclusion.

=== Week 2 ===
First aired January 11, 2011
Both teams were in a competition for a $10,000 prize this week. Alison also mentioned the challenge for the Biggest Loser Ranch team – if they could defeat the Unknowns team (in terms of total percent of body weight loss), the entire team would be granted immunity for the week; otherwise, one member would have to go home.

Much of the first hour featured Arthur of the Blue team and his struggles. Arthur admitted that he blew his chance at success when he failed to attend class in school and was more interested in chasing women, thus costing him his scholarship, at which point he stopped caring. He was also well known by his local pizzeria; they actually called him every evening before making their rounds to see if he wanted his usual order that night (supreme pizza, which he could easily eat by himself).

Dr. Huizenga visited the Ranch contestants, showing them how their lifestyles were adversely affecting their health.

Both teams were also involved in a challenge – build a "bridge" of rafts across a body of water (first from the shore to a center pier, then a second segment). The winning team would get a three-pound advantage at weigh-in. The Unknowns (led by Rulon Gardner's organization) completed the challenge in 38:23; the Ranch team (with no consistent strategy) did not even get halfway across in that time, thus the Unknowns gained the advantage.

The last chance workout and Ranch weigh-in featured Bob solo as Jillian was ill.

The Unknowns lost 79 pounds (82 with the advantage) or 2.46% of total weight. Moses lost an additional 12 pounds (for a two-week record 53 pounds total) while Rulon also continued his success with a 17-pound loss.

The Ranch team would need to lose 78 pounds to beat the percentage. Irene (Orange team remaining member) started the weigh-in with a 10-pound loss, the single best performance of any contestant on either team. While the Black and Purple teams did below average, the Green and Aqua teams did above average (with Courtney of the Aqua team coming in under 300 pounds). This left the final weigh-in (needing only nine pounds to win) to the Blue team; Arthur was confident that he would lose that much himself, while Jesse was concerned. Blue would lose 21 pounds total (Arthur lost 13; Jesse, 8), and the Ranch team won immunity and the $10,000 prize.

=== Week 3 ===
First aired January 18, 2011
The identities of the unknown trainers are finally revealed – Cara Castronuova (who trains using boxing; she lost both her parents at a young age) and Brett Hoebel (specializing in martial arts; he was an overweight teen).

The Unknowns discuss last week's loss to the Ranch; Justin (Yellow team) specifically calls out Q (Red team) who had been putting up poor numbers.

The Unknowns and the Ranch teams meet for the first challenge, though each group competed separately. The challenge was to balance an egg on an upside-down frying pan; the winner from each group would later compete in a pop quiz involving chef Curtis Stone, with the overall winner gaining a two-pound advantage for their team (if the Unknowns won the advantage would carry over to the fifth week). The Unknowns elect to compete as a team, and throw the contest to Deni (Pink team). The Ranch team competes individually with Marci (Aqua team) winning the challenge.

Dr. Huizenga visits the Unknowns camp and discusses their various health issues (especially Sarah from the Pink team, who has a 58% body fat content, the highest of all the contestants (by comparison, Rulon has only a 40% body fat content despite being over 200 pounds heavier).

Back on the Ranch, Bob talks to the Purple team (who was upset at losing only six pounds each the prior week) while Jillian talks to the Black team (Dan is especially concerned about separation anxiety and has never really dealt with the loss of his son, Adam, to drug use). Due to illness, Arthur (Blue team) is restricted to working out in the swimming pool.

Deni and Marci visit with Curtis Stone. In the pop quiz, each player had to guess the total caloric content of the meals Curtis prepared; the closest would get the advantage. Marci guessed 480; Deni wanted to guess 500 but settled on 440, the correct answer was 572 so Marci gained the advantage.

The second challenge (Ranch only) involving filling a bucket with water and carrying it 1/4 mile to a barrel. The goal was to fill other teams' barrels; the last team would win the sole elimination vote (subject to finishing above the yellow line). This time the Ranch teams worked together and allowed Irene (the sole member of the Orange team) to win the contest (however, if Irene didn't finish above the yellow line she would be automatically eliminated).

Bob and Jillian again meet with the Ranch teams. Dan freely admits that if the rules would allow it, even if he finished above the yellow line he would sacrifice his spot and go home, which upsets Jillian. At the last chance workout Arthur is able to rejoin the others.

At the weigh-in it is revealed that Moses (Gray team) has now lost 64 pounds in three weeks, while Q (called out earlier by the other Unknowns) lost 19 pounds that week. (Rulon's weight loss was not shown in this episode; he lost an additional 10 pounds.)

Aqua team goes first and loses 13 pounds before the advantage. Irene (Orange team) goes next and needs six pounds to remain on the Ranch and be able to use her voting privilege; she loses eight and stays safe. The Green team goes next; Jay has had "349" written on his arm all week to stress his goal and ends up missing by only one pound (350), and they are also safe.

Blue team is next and needs 23 pounds to remain safe, but they lose only 13 pounds and are in danger (Aqua team thus becomes safe). Jesse is ready to celebrate that Arthur (despite his setbacks) has lost weight; Bob does not want to celebrate since he feels Arthur needs to remain on the Ranch for quite a while due to his health. Purple team is next and, in a case of deja vu, both Olivia Ward and Hannah again lose six pounds each, but this time it is enough to be safe.

This leaves only the Black team, who only need to lose a total of nine pounds to stay safe; the Blue team admits there isn't a "snowball's chance in Hell" of staying. But in a total shock, both Dan and Don each gained nine pounds; Don insists they didn't quit, which neither Bob nor Jillian believe. (The preview clip at show's end indicates that the argument will continue to the following week.)

At elimination, Irene respects Dan's wishes and sends him home. At home, Dan is now down to 215 pounds and is working out with his daughter Madelyn (wearing a "Team Evans – Trainer" shirt); Madelyn says that she is happy as she does not want to lose her dad like she lost her brother.

=== Week 4 ===
First aired January 25, 2011

The episode started with the shocking conclusion from the previous week's episode – the combined 18-pound weight gain by the Black team. When meeting with the rest of the Ranch team, Don insisted that he did not quit; Marci (Aqua team) didn't believe him. Irene and Don (the remaining members of the Orange and Black teams) were combined into a new team (though both continued to wear their original colors).

The first challenge featured an entire room with several shelves, each shelf containing the favorite food of one of the contestants (the one they would normally eat in excess, such as Arthur's entire supreme pizza, which his pizzeria would promptly deliver every evening at 8:30 PM without him having to call in an order). Each team had three minutes to decide whether or not to eat any food; the team who ate the most calories would have the power to send one team to the Unknowns facility for the week. The Blue team were the only ones to participate (Arthur ate one chicken leg, which was Jesse's favorite food) and voted to send the Green team off. The Green team arrives at the Unknowns facility and engages in a light workout.

Meanwhile at the Ranch, the first workout begins with the expected confrontation between Don, Bob, and Jillian over his past week's performance, accusing him of quitting and not being angry (in response to his mild-mannered approach; Don responds with an expletive-filled tirade). After the workout, Courtney speaks with Jillian about how her mom (Marci) would try to "fix" things for her (usually in response to people criticizing Courtney for her weight). Jillian tells her that the two need to discuss the issue (which they do later in the show).

Over at the Unknowns, the Green team sees the difference in approaches (mainly that with the Unknowns, meals are prepared and beds are made; at the Ranch the contestants cook for themselves and make their own beds). The Greens then return to the Ranch for the second challenge, again involving each contestant's favorite food. The remaining Ranch teams compete as a unit against Green team for the prize of letters from home; the goal is to guess the total caloric content of all the contestants' favorite foods. The Ranch teams win the challenge (the total is 8,754 calories).

Due to the airing of the State of the Union address, the episode was only one hour long, and featured no Last Chance Workout or weigh-in (these segments were aired on the first half of the Week 5 episode). However, the preview featured another large weight gain (six pounds) with Bob stating that he hoped the contestant gained something from his/her stay, hinting that it was Don.

=== Week 5 ===
First aired February 1, 2011

In the completion of Week 4 both teams are featured doing their last chance workouts. On the Unknowns, Q (Red team) quits during his workout, upsetting the rest of the team (especially Rulon) as well as Cara. The Ranch workout features Jillian working with Hannah (Purple team) to overcome her fears resulting from her serious back injury (three disintegrated discs) which ended her athletic career and started her weight gain.

The Ranch team then goes to their (delayed) weigh-in, which features the returning Green team. Green goes first and loses 15 pounds(2.53%). Blue team goes next and needs to lose 18 pounds to be safe, but gets only 12 (1.65%), placing them at risk for the second straight week. Aqua needs to lose eight and gets 13 (2.58%), while Purple needs to lose 7 and barely stays safe, losing 8 (1.77%) Orange/Black need to lose eight to force Blue into elimination; Don is shown with a starting weight of 280 (his nine-pound gain is not carried over from the previous week). However, both players "gained" 6 pounds each (+2.38%) (Irene's is a real gain; Don's is a net three pound loss from his actual weight) and both admitted that they threw the weigh-in; Don wanted to leave the Ranch and Irene wanted Arthur to be safe from elimination. There was no voting room scene; immediately after the weigh-in, the remaining members unanimously agree to honor Don's request and send him home. This officially ended the fourth week of the competition and started the fifth week.

The new trainers then start working with all the remaining teams. The Ranch team is offered a team challenge – they lost 48 pounds as a group, if they can lose at least 49 pounds this week they would all gain immunity.

The Unknowns, however, will have a vote, but will participate in a challenge with the winning team gaining immunity for the week – the challenge is to stack weights on other team's scales; when a team gets 500 pounds they are out. All the teams first work to eliminate the Red team (not wanting Q to get immunity) then the Brown team, then the Pink team . However, the Yellow team used strategy by placing their smaller weights on the scales first, keeping their heavier weights for later. This put the Grey team at a disadvantage – they have only the smaller weights to use on Yellow team, and although they started with a near 200-pound advantage on Yellow, Yellow catches up and eliminates Grey, thus winning immunity.

Bob and Jillian work with all the teams on the last chance workout.

Both groups appear at the weigh-in, with the Ranch teams going first. Irene (whose starting weight is reset to 224) loses eight pounds (3.57%) (a net 14 pound real loss). Green loses 14 (2.43%), Purple loses 11 (2.47%), and Aqua loses 15 (3.06%) to get to 48 (with Marci reaching 200 pounds exactly). Blue needs to lose only 1 pound for the Ranch teams to gain collective immunity; remembering the bizarre endings of the last two weigh-ins they aren't so sure, but they lose 15 (2.09%) for a total 63 pound Ranch weight loss and immunity.

The Unknowns then weigh-in, with Yellow going first. Notwithstanding their immunity they lose 33 pounds total (4.59%) (Justin loses 16 and goes below 300 pounds, Rulon loses 17 and goes below 400 pounds; Rulon mentions that he was 265 pounds when he won the gold medal and is trying to get back to that weight).

Red goes next and loses 24 pounds (3.59%) (13 for Q and 11 for Larialmy). However, all three of the other teams lose more than enough to stay safe (Brown needed 24 and lost 30 (4.43%), Grey needed 20 and lost 23 (4.04%) with Kaylee going below 200 pounds, and Pink needing 16 and losing 20 (4.42%) though being nearly certain they would be subject to elimination) so Red falls below the yellow line.

Q and Larialmy speak with the remaining Unknowns and state that they have discussed the issue and want the others to send Larialmy home, Q stating that she can lose the weight at home while he couldn't do so. The remaining Unknowns are skeptical – Justin makes Q say directly to Larialmy that he will lose weight at the Ranch, Sarah asks what will they do if the others decide to send Q home (Larialmy replies that if they truly are a family, they would not hurt her), and Rulon is still uncertain about keeping Q on the show.

At the vote, Pink, Grey, and Yellow all admit that they wanted to send Q home, but agreed to honor their wishes and vote to send Larialmy home (Brown's vote isn't revealed).

At home, Larialmy is down to 227 pounds (an overall 74 pound loss) and is working out with her sisters (one of whom has lost 14 pounds). Don is down to 222 pounds (an overall 87 pound loss) and works out with Dan. He has also managed to heal his relationship with his estranged son.

=== Week 6 ===
First aired February 8, 2011

Alison announces that the current teams will be dissolved. The Unknowns will compete as a group as the Red team; the Ranch team will compete as a group and chose Black shirts (over Blue).

With the episode being the final one before Valentine's Day, the first challenge was a temptation involving chocolate. Each player would be allowed to eat as many chocolate pieces as s/he wished, the player eating the most would have the power to (if he/she desired) switch up to two players from his/her team for the same number from the other team. Further, the winner would remain a secret – Alison will announce only the player's decision. Alison announces that the winner chose to swap Jay and Jen (Black to Red) for Sarah and Deni (Red to Black). Arthur (who ate 35 pieces) admitted he did it; he stated that he distrusted Jay and Jen from week one, and thought Sarah and Deni would be voted off the following two weeks, thus protecting him and Jesse. However, the decision causes a huge rift among the Black team; Bob and Jillian believe that Arthur hurt his cause by making the Black team weaker overall.

Both teams and all four trainers were featured trying to compete for space in the Ranch gym.

The second challenge featured contests in five disciplines: endurance, speed, agility, strength, and knowledge. The winning team would receive videos from home. After the teams chose their players for each discipline (the last one would have only one player), Alison announced that the disciplines were not what everyone thought:

- Endurance involved enduring direction from a teammate – one player would have to roll a rock uphill, blindfolded, taking direction only from his/her partner.
- Speed involved how fast a pair could stack bricks to a six-foot height and keep the stack stable for five seconds.
- Agility involved how quickly a pair could arrange five dishes, from lowest to highest in terms of caloric content.
- Strength involved a balance of how quickly a pair could carry each end of a log while balancing on a telephone pole (if a player fell off, they would have to restart from the beginning).
- Knowledge involved the heart – one player would have to shoot an arrow through a heart.

After the fifth discipline, a final task would be revealed (it would be completing a heart-shaped jigsaw puzzle).

Black won all five disciplines and the final task handily (Red had trouble with the Agility discipline). Black invited Bob and Jillian to watch the videos (for Deni it was special since she missed her daughter's wedding to participate on the show). Brett discusses healthy cereals with Red team, plugging General Mills whole grain brands.

The last chance workout was not shown (Cara would appear at the weigh-in with a broken finger).

At the weigh-in the Red team went first. Jay and Jen both lost 14 pounds each (4.23%), (6.03%), Austin lost 10 (3.06%), Ken also lost 14 (4.36%). Q lost 7 (1.81%) and made excuses for his performance. Rulon lost 12 (3.04%) while Justin lost 10 (3.42%); neither was happy which upset Brett and Cara (thinking that, as the leaders of the Red team, they should celebrate small victories). Kaylee lost five pounds (2.56%). Moses needed to lose 11 pounds (3.13%) to become the fastest contestant to lose 100 pounds (six weigh-ins); he lost exactly that amount. Red lost a total of 97 pounds or 3.43% total percentage.

Black needed to lose 78 pounds to beat Red's percentage gain and remain safe. Deni lost 9 (4.28%) while Sarah lost 10 (4.50%). Arthur lost 9 (2.02%) and was very upset, believing that he would probably be sent home. Jesse lost 11 (4.28%), Courtney lost 10 (3.63%), and Marci lost 13 (6.50%) (falling below 200 pounds). Needing 15 pounds to win, Olivia loses 16 (7.14%). Alison declares the contest over, but Irene's 12 (5.55%) and Hannah's 9 (4.28%) are shown. Black defeated Red in both total pounds lost (99) and percentage (4.35%).

Alison announced that Jen (6.03%) was immune from being voted off. At the table, Jen and Jay both vote to send Q home. Q votes for Jay, but Ken, Moses, and Justin each vote to send Q home. At home, Q is now down to 345 pounds. He takes Larialmy to a gym for Valentine's Day, promising that they will become a healthy couple.

=== Week 7 ===
First aired February 15, 2011

The episode started with a pop challenge. Each team was tied together to a huge rope with knots in it. The first team to untangle their rope, wins. The prize: access to the gym for the week. The red team flew through the challenge and won the challenge. Black team has no gym access for the week.

As the black team has their first workout outside, Bob & Jillian notice the strange energy and ask the team about it. Hannah states that she feels like the black team is viewed as the underdogs and she doesn't like that – she doesn't want to be viewed as weak. Bob reminds them that the black team crushed the red team at the weigh in – the black team is not weak. Despite not having access to the gym, the black team has a strong workout.

As the red team is working out in the gym, Cara pushes Rulon and he doesn't like it. The two go outside to have a discussion and he tells her that his past is his past and he refuses to talk about it. She tries to explain that what happened in his past has a large role in why he got to 500+ pounds. He tells her that he isn't ready to talk about it with her and she tells him she's not giving up on him.

The teams meet at night for the weekly challenge. Allison informs them that the challenge will have each team push a 24-ton train 800 feet. Throughout the challenge, they will have to answer 6 trivia questions. Each train is filled with a bag of food that represents an answer to those questions. They will need to throw out the right bag of food for each question. A wrong answer will result in 15 seconds being added to their time. The teams go one at a time and the one with the fastest overall time wins. The winning team gains the ability to pick a player from the other team whose weight loss will not count for the week. The black team goes first. Because they have an extra player, they sit out Deni. Olivia and Marci are in the train car answering the questions while the other players are pushing the train car. Arthur can't keep up and ends up running behind the train. The black team has a finishing time of 2:05. The red team starts. They have Kaylee and Jen in the train answering the questions and all of the guys pushing. They have a finishing time of 1:35. The black team had 4 wrong answers for an additional minute added to their time making it 3:05. In order for the red team to win, they just have to get one answer right. They had 5 wrong answers which added 1:15 to their time making it 2:50 and they won the challenge.

At the weigh in, red team weighs in first. Jay lost 9 lbs, Jen lost 7 lbs, Moses lost 7 lbs, Kaylee lost 3 lbs, Justin lost 5 lbs, Rulon lost 11 lbs, Austin lost 10 lbs, and Ken lost 11 lbs for a total of 63 lbs and a percentage of weight lost of 2.68% for the red team. For the black team to win, they need to lose more than 52 lbs as a team. The red team chooses Irene's weight loss to not count for the team. Irene lost 6 lbs. Deni lost 5 lbs, Sarah lost 4 lbs, Olivia lost 2 lbs, Hannah lost 7 lbs, Marci lost 6 lbs, Courtney lost 7 lbs, Jesse lost 8 lbs, and Arthur lost 20 lbs, for a team total of 59 lbs and 3.02%. Black team wins the weigh in.

Ken is the biggest loser of the red team and has immunity. The red team eliminates Jay.

=== Week 8 ===
First aired February 22, 2011

At the beginning of the episode, Allison tells the teams that two people will be going home this week. There will be a red line and the person who has the lowest percentage of weight loss will fall below the red line and will go home immediately. Then, the team that loses the weigh in will eliminate a player.

Moses is afraid Kaylee may be the one to fall below the red line so he makes her get up before 6:00 every morning to get an extra work-out in to try and ensure her safety this week.

The teams meet Allison on a football field for this week's challenge. The goal is to move 6 enormous balls from one end of the field to the goal at the other end of the field – the balls can't touch the ground, can't hit it twice in a row, and they will be wearing boxing gloves. The first team to 6 wins a 3 lb advantage at the weigh in. The black team struggles through and the red team wins 6–1.

At the ranch, there is a conversation with the black team. Marci and Deni tell the others that they would be willing to fall below the red line or be voted out in order to allow the younger girls and, especially Arthur to stay. Jesse gets very upset and says that he needs to be there just as much as any of the others – he doesn't want to be 'thrown out' just because he's the old man. The discussion gets heated and eventually Olivia leaves the room and several are upset at how Jesse acted.

At the weigh in, the red team weighed in first. Austin lost 7 lbs, Ken lost 5 lbs, Justin lost 7 lbs, Rulon lost 4 lbs, Kaylee lost 7 lbs, Moses lost 11 lbs, and Jen gained 2 lbs. With the 3 lb advantage they one at the challenge, the red team's total is 42 lbs and a total percentage of weight loss of 2.12%. Jen is at the bottom with a +0.95% and at risk of being below the red line and eliminated.

The black team needs to lose more than 44 lbs to win the weigh in. Arthur weighed in first and lost 9 lbs. Olivia lost 4 lbs, Sarah lost 4 lbs, Irene lost 3 lbs, Hannah lost 1 lb, Courtney lost 2 lbs, Marci gained 1 lb, Jesse gained 3 lbs, and Deni gained 8 lbs. Marci, Jesse, and Deni gained intentionally with the thought of making sure the younger ones were safe and wouldn't go home. Deni was below the red line and was immediately eliminated. The black team only lost 11 lbs (0.53%) as a team and lost the weigh in. They voted unanimously to send Jesse home.

By the time this episode aired, Jesse was at 227 pounds, and Deni was 170. Ana, who was eliminated week 1, makes a cameo appearance in Jesse's exit video.

=== Week 9 ===
First aired March 1, 2011

The 14 remaining contestants are told that they will be returning home for two weeks, then heading back to the ranch for the weigh-in. Before the weigh-in, they compete in a challenge; more specifically, the very same challenge they faced in Week 1: Running a 5k. However, there is a twist: The teams are being shaken-up again, and the order that each contestant finishes in determines the order in which they would get to choose which set of trainers (Cara & Brett, or Jillian & Bob) they want to be with.

At the end of the challenge, all of the contestants decide to stay with the trainers they are currently with, except for Jen, who choose to return to Bob & Jillian's Black team. Sarah chooses to stay with Bob and Jillian as well, opting out of returning to Brett & Cara's Red Team. This means that Arthur is stuck with having to join Brett & Cara's team. The weigh-in begins, and the Black Team is up first. Jen and Marci both lose 14 pounds. Irene, Courtney and Sarah all lose 10, Hannah loses 11 and Olivia loses 12. The Black team ends with a total of 81 pounds.

The Red team needs to lose more than 120 pounds to win, an average of 17 pounds per player. Rulon loses 17 and gives the Red team a little more confidence. But then, the weight losses begin to deteriorate. Austin goes and loses 10, but then his father goes up and loses only 5. Moses loses 5 as well and Kaylee loses only 1 pound. Justin loses 8 pounds, which means Arthur needs to lose 18 or more pounds to win immunity, but he only loses 16. The Black Team wins the weigh-in, meaning the red team had to send someone home (except Rulon, who wins immunity for having the highest weight loss percentage on the Red Team). Because the group dynamics were set up against him, they unanimously vote off the new member Arthur despite Bob & Jillian's desperate pleading for them not to do so.

Arthur's update video indicated that he currently weighs 345 lbs, for a total weight loss so far of 162 lbs. His goal is to be at 250 by the finale.

=== Week 10 ===
First aired March 8, 2011

After Arthur is voted home, Allison calls the black team into the deliberation room and says that for every team to be great, you must have a great leader. Then she has each team officially choose a team captain – someone who can lead, someone they trust, someone who will be making decisions for the team. Red chooses Justin and black chooses Marci.

Their first act as team captains: choose 1 person to cook for the team for the week and chose only 2 people to work out with the trainers for the day. Marci chooses Olivia to be the cook and Sarah and Hannah to work with Bob & Jillian for the day. Justin chooses Ken to be the cook and Ken and Kaylee to work with Brett & Cara.

The teams meet up for a night-time challenge. There is 100 yards of mud and obstacles and the challenge is to be the first team to the end – without touching the ground. There are round steps they will be moving and re-arranging to get from start to finish. Winning team shares $6,000. The team captains are responsible for deciding the starting points for their teammates. Marci also has the choice of whom to sit out for the black team. She chooses Courtney who is very unhappy about being left out. The red team takes an early lead but fall into the mud half-way through the second obstacle and have to go back to the second checkpoint which gives the black team a chance to catch up and take a small lead. At the third obstacle, the teams pick up their final members. At the fourth obstacle, red team falls in the mud again and have to go back to the third checkpoint giving the black team an even larger lead and, ultimately, the victory.

At the weigh in, the red team weighs in first. Justin lost 8 lbs, Rulon lost 8 lbs, Moses lost 8 lbs, Kaylee lost 5 lbs, Austin lost 6 lbs, and Ken lost 9 lbs, for a team total of 44 lbs (2.61%). The black team needs to lose more than 35 lbs to beat the red team and win the weigh in. Marci lost 5 lbs, Courtney lost 5 lbs, Irene lost 5 lbs, Sarah lost 4 lbs, Olivia lost 2 lbs, Hannah lost 2 lbs, and Jen lost 1 lb for a team weight loss of 24 lbs (1.76%). The red team won the weigh in sending black team to elimination room.

Marci had intended to sacrifice herself and have the girls send her home but she had the highest percentage of weight loss and won immunity. Marci voted for Olivia, Sarah voted for Jen, and Hannah, Jen, Courtney, & Olivia voted for Sarah which was enough to send her home.

=== Week 11 ===
First aired March 15, 2011

The contestants are combined from two teams into one – the blue team. They are told that if as a team they can lose more than 64 pounds, everyone will have immunity. Several contestants have updates with Dr. H, and are doing much better – including Moses, who has extended his life by 19 years; and Marci, who has already reached her ideal weight. They have a pop challenge where everyone breaks into partners – one person from the former black team, with one person from the former red team – and each pair cooks a low calorie meal to be judged by Curtis Stone and Lorena Garcia. Moses and Olivia win the challenge, with a baked cod dish. Their prize is they receive the Biggest Loser meal plan while they are home between the end of their stay on the ranch, and the finale.

This week the trainers are switched up – Bob and Jillian work with the former red team, and Brett and Cara work with the former black team. Bob focuses on pushing Rulon as hard as possible, and motivates Austin to lose a "lucky 7" pounds. Meanwhile, Hannah opens up to Cara about her struggles.

In the regular challenge, the team has to pull a rope that is connected to trivia questions about their season. If they answer each question correctly, the rope will lead to the next question; if not, the rope will lead in the wrong direction. If the team accomplishes this challenge within 90 minutes, they will receive a 5 lb advantage; if not, a 5 lb disadvantage. The team struggles at first, answering a question incorrectly along with an injury to Hannah. In the end they are able to complete the challenge with 6 seconds to spare.

At the weigh-in, several of the contestants pull the numbers needed to make the goal weight which is now 59 lbs. Austin exceeds his "lucky 7" by losing 8 lbs. However, some contestants fall short and the team does not reach the goal, forcing an elimination. With Marci (0) and Kaylee (+2) below the yellow line, Marci pleads to be the one sent home as she has already reached her goal weight. The contestants respect her wishes and Marci is eliminated.

=== Week 12 ===
First aired March 22, 2011

The eleven remaining contestants are divided into 4 teams – each trainer is in charge of a team. Each team has three players, except for the black team who only has two (Hannah & Rulon). Because of this, they are given the task to select one player who has been eliminated to return to the ranch and be the third player on the black team.

Throughout the week each trainer brings his/her team to various locations off campus to give them some time away from the ranch. Each of the contestants experiences a personal moment of growth during this time.

Back on the ranch, it is revealed at the week's challenge that Hannah and Rulon have selected Jay to return to the ranch. Jay and Jennifer share an excited father-daughter reunion. The challenge is to hold a block weighing the combined total of how much weight each team has lost above a container of water. If the team lets go of their block, it will smash the container of water and put out a fire below. The red team wins the challenge, but gives their prize – video chat with family back home – to the blue team.

Kaylee has decided that this is her week to go home, and gets her team in on throwing the weigh in. She loses no weight, and Austin loses 3 lbs. Ken however loses 7 pounds, causing their team to be safe from elimination, and drives Kaylee to tears. Alison tells Kaylee that she can leave any time she wants, however the elimination will still go as scheduled whether Kaylee leaves or not. Moses steps in to talk to his daughter and advises her to stay, and she reluctantly agrees. This leaves the red team to face elimination. Jennifer was the biggest loser on the red team, leaving the other three teams to decide between Courtney and Justin. Justin asks to be voted off, as he feels Courtney is not finished with her journey yet; the other contestants agree and Justin is eliminated. In his exit video, Justin indicated that he is now at 225 lbs.

=== Week 13 ===
First aired March 29, 2011

After eliminating Justin, the teams return to the ranch and Kaylee apologizes for believing her time had come. She re-commits herself to being at the ranch and realizes that it is not time for her to go home and that she still has a lot to learn from the ranch, her teammates and her trainers.

Vance and Leann are revealed as the 12th team that just missed the being on the show and are offered a chance to win a spot on the ranch. If they lost a higher percentage of weight at home than the lowest person on the ranch (Kaylee) then they would be entered back into the game. Vance lost 30 pounds and Leann lost 45, which while excellent numbers, were not enough to earn them a spot in the competition.

The remaining four teams square off for a wild pop challenge that involves balancing colored balls, with the losing team has to leave the ranch for the week and the winning team gaining a one-minute advantage in the challenge later in the week. Austin and Kaylee win the pop challenge for the green team, while Jennifer and Courtney are the last team to finish.

The Red Team is given a menu of options for their week away from the ranch, and they work with a limited budget to purchase what items they’ll need most. Ultimately, Jennifer and Courtney choose spa treatment and a night out on the town in lieu of working with their trainer. Brett is very disappointed in their choices when the girls inform him that they have chosen to work out without him.

Trainer Bob Harper takes his contestants to an inner-city school, where they energize the students with a fun workout and talk about the importance of fitness. The Biggest Loser also presents the school with a $10,000 to work together to increase the fitness and health of the students.

Then all the contestants go on a huge Easter egg hunt for 5,000 eggs, including a Golden Egg that comes with a very coveted prize. Each member of the team that collects 600 of their team's colored eggs first wins a pair of tickets to the world premiere of the new movie, Hop. Additionally, each team that completes the challenge will be treated to a sneak preview of the film. Armed with their one-minute head start, the Green Team beats out the Red Team for the premiere tickets. However, Olivia is the contestant that finds the coveted Golden Egg.

All four teams complete the challenge, and the Golden Egg's prize is revealed to be the only vote at elimination that week. Olivia, who was expecting immunity, money or a similar prize, has mixed feelings about holding so much power at elimination.

At the weigh in, Rulon shows underwhelming numbers again, and Jillian calls him out for cheating on his diet. After impressive numbers by the Blue Team and the Green Team, the Black Team is up for elimination with just the Red Team left to weigh in. Rulon is understandably nervous because Olivia has made it clear that if it comes down to Rulon and Hannah, she will not send her sister home.

But Courtney and Jennifer lose only two pounds and are the team up for elimination. Since Courtney had the highest percentage of weight loss, Jennifer is automatically eliminated.

Jennifer has since lost over 100 pounds and is able to go clothes shopping with her girlfriends for the first time. She has been working out with her brother since being eliminated and hopes to be down to 140 pounds by the finale.

=== Week 14 ===
First aired April 5, 2011

After Jen's elimination leaves Courtney as the only remaining member of the Red Team, she sits down with Irene and Hannah and asks them to keep her accountable this week.

The teams are greeted with a pop challenge—each team must approximate one mile by placing their team's flag on the marker they believe is exactly one mile from the starting line. The winners of the pop challenge would enjoy one night out and about Hollywood while the losers must stay behind and clean the entire ranch. With varying strategies, the teams place their flags with the Black Team coming the closest and winning the challenge. Given the way of how last week's life of luxury affected Jennifer and Courtney, the black team is apprehensive, but excited nonetheless.

After the challenge, Courtney sits down with Brett to talk about her one-on-one training for the week. Cara works out her Green team and Ken suffers an injury near his oblique that limits him mostly to walking. Because of this and Kaylee's big week, Austin feels the pressure to carry the team this week. Black and Blue teams work out in the gym, but Jillian and Rulon hash out the former Olympic medalist's rogue eating habits. Jillian is concerned that by straying from his diet, he is sabotaging himself and his team. Rulon explains that he views snacks as a reward for having a successful workout, while Jillian coaches Rulon to find things that are good for him, but still highly enjoyable.

When Jillian finally enters the gym with Rulon, her team postpones telling her about the prize that they won during the pop challenge. When the do eventually tell her, Jillian doesn't believe that a night out is considered a prize and is shocked that her team is so excited about it.

Green, Red and Blue teams get started on cleaning the ranch while Rulon, Hannah and Jay enjoy a night out in Hollywood. They grab dinner at an Asian restaurant and make smart decisions with the foods that they order. Hannah enjoys a nice conversation with a gentleman that took a fancy towards her. She realizes that her choices in the past months have changed her life for the better.

The teams talk about what the weigh in could look like, and the consensus is that the players are most concerned about Courtney. Her numbers have been largely unimpressive the past six weeks or so and she is the only member remaining from the red team. If the red team loses the weigh-in, Courtney will automatically be eliminated.

Bob has a chat with his team about foods that they used to eat before coming to the Biggest Loser and introduces them to Wholly Guacamole, a natural and healthy alternative.

The teams push through a tough last chance workout, with each trainer working their teams hard. Rulon notices improved flexibility and Courtney works to avoid being eliminated.

At the weigh-in, the Black team and Blue team put up great numbers. Irene loses 6 pounds and Rulon posts a seven-pound loss, crediting Jillian's care and support. The green team loses a total of just 7 pounds, with Ken fighting an injury and Kaylee coming off a big weight loss the previous week.

Courtney weighs in needing to lose just 3 pounds to beat the Green team and remain safe. She loses only one pound and is automatically eliminated. Since the Red team has no more members in the game, trainer Brett is also asked to leave the Biggest Loser.

By the time this episode aired, Courtney is down to 210 pounds, and she is reunited with her mother, having lost 94 pounds on the ranch and with an improved vision of her life. She discusses potential menu options at her family's Dairy Queen that are healthier options.

=== Week 15 ===
First aired April 12, 2011

For the next two weeks they will be training in New Zealand. Jillian takes a jump off the Auckland Sky Tower and the contestants climb a mountain and sail boats.

The contestants begin the new week expressing their shock about having a trainer eliminated. But that is not the biggest surprise as Alison announces the remaining players and trainers are headed to New Zealand. On the plane, the Air New Zealand flight attendant asks the players how tall Auckland's famed Sky Tower is and informs them that the closest guess would have their seat upgraded from economy to first class. With guesses ranging from a few hundred feet to 11,000, Austin's guess of 1,110 feet is the closest to the actual height of 1,076 feet.

The players are treated to a panoramic view of Auckland from atop a hill before being informed that they are to walk up over 1000 steps to the top of Sky Tower. Upon reaching the top, they are given the option of walking back down the steps or taking the Sky Jump down. Moses and Rulon do not meet the weight limit and Jay's heart condition prevents him from attempting the Sky Jump. Most other players are excited for the opportunity, but Ken expresses his fear of heights. Bob shares his fear of heights with Ken and both men agree to overcome their fear and complete the jump.

After the jump, Moses and Bob talk about the family history that Moses has in New Zealand, where his father was sent to receive a better education that played a large role in eventually bringing the Kinikini family to America. Bob breaks the rules and lets Moses use his cell phone to call his father, and they share an emotional conversation.

The crew is then introduced to a Kiwi-style workout. Being the world's leading sailing nation, the contestants board a sailboat and work together to operate the boat and find out that there is more to sailing than they first believed.

The teams get started with workouts, with Jillian worried about the negative effect that traveling can have on weight-loss. Ken talks with Cara about his personal workouts and lets her know what he needs. He suggests that perhaps he'll be better off working with either Bob or Jillian and Cara responds emotionally, pointing out his incredible weight loss with her. Ken questions her closing ability, quoting Bob and Jillian's lengthy Biggest Loser experience.

The teams meet at Bethell's Beach for their next challenge. The players compete in a New Zealand-style 5K in which the course includes hills, creeks, sand dunes and beach terrain. The teams must run the race together, and the team that wins will earn a helicopter ride to the island of Waiheke for a scenic lunch.

The Green team pulls ahead at the beginning of the race while Jay and the Black Team are slowed by an old hamstring injury. The Green and Blue teams reach the sand dune and begin to ascend it. Ken struggles to find the strength to make it to the top and the Blue team moves into the lead. Ken ultimately makes it up the sand dune and the Green team continues after the Blue team.

Despite falling behind, the Black team resolves to complete the 5K and compete against themselves. Ultimately, the Blue team wins the crosses the finish line holding hands. Moses reflects on his father's and his own accomplishments. The Green team finishes second and the black team finishes with Rulon carrying Hannah across the finish line. Irene and Olivia offer their prize to Kaylee so that Moses can share this experience with Kaylee. Father and daughter enjoy a scenic helicopter ride and end their lunch with a toast to Moses' father.

The teams come together for a combined last chance workout before the looming New Zealand weigh in. They warm up before going through Bob's yoga class, after which Cara takes Ken aside for an extra workout to challenge Ken and to make sure that Ken is comfortable with his effort.

With traditional Maori wood carvings and the city of Auckland as a backdrop, the contestants begin the weigh-in. Irene and Olivia lose a total of five pounds, but Moses does not lose any weight, leaving the Blue Team with a total loss of five pounds. The Black Team must lose more than six pounds to keep themselves safe and after Jay gains two pounds, Rulon loses seven pounds and Hannah loses four to keep the Black team intact for at least one more week.

The Green teams must lose more than five pounds to keep their team, and their trainer safe. Kaylee gains four pounds, but Austin, wearing the Maori symbol for "new beginning" loses eight pounds and Ken loses six to save the green team. Ken credits Cara's ability to adapt to what he needed this week.

With the highest percentage of weight loss, Irene is safe and leaves Moses and Olivia up for elimination. Moses realizes his time has come and asks the remaining contestants to keep Olivia and to send him home.

Hannah, Jay and Austin vote for Moses, but Kaylee can not bring herself to send her father home. Finally, Ken respects Moses' wishes and votes to send him home (the following episode reveals that Rulon's uncast vote had been for Olivia). Moses says he is ready to go home to see his wife and daughter, reminds Kaylee to continue her hard work and thanks the remaining contestants for the changes they have inspired in him.

Moses now weights 273 pounds, having lost 167 pounds on the Biggest Loser. He returned to New Zealand with his father and they visit the Auckland Grammar School, where his father began his education. Moses also returns to bungee jump, which he was too heavy to do the first time around. He visits the Auckland Harbour Bridge and successfully jumps with his father looking on. He plans to return to the Sky Tower with his family and make the jump he was unable to attempt during his initial visit.

=== Week 16 ===
First aired April 19, 2011

Week 16 opens in Queenstown, New Zealand, home to many epic Hollywood movies, including Wolverine and the Lord of the Rings trilogy. Referencing the individual determination of Kiwi mountain climber Sir Edmund Hillary, Alison announces the competition is going back to singles. As they get back their original colors, the contestants reflect back on how far they have come. The contest welcomes Brett back to the competition, who certainly seems excited to return.

Cara takes Hannah and Kaylee to the world's highest cliff jump, which is 109 meters high. The girls get strapped in and ready to go. Like Bob from last week, Cara seems hesitant to take the plunge but eventually does, but not without a fair amount of screaming! Kaylee and Hannah also make the jump and admit that fear no longer holds them back.

At the week's first workout, the trainers talk about the importance of fending for yourself during singles week. After Auckland's weigh in saw some contestants gain weight, the trainers motivate the players to avoid pitfalls while on vacation. Brett focuses on Kaylee, trying to work out some emotional issues and mental blocks about losing weight. Kaylee believes that with her father gone from the competition, it will allow her to focus solely on herself. Olivia and Rulon workout together, with tensions running high because of Rulon's vote for Olivia at last week's elimination. Hannah expresses a fear of going home and reverting to the old lifestyles that brought her to the Biggest Loser in the first place.

Alison brings them to the famed Hackett Bungee Jump and introduces them to their next challenge—a half mile riverboard. The winner receives a helicopter tour of the beautiful Milford Sound in addition to immunity at the weigh in. The contestants start the challenge and Austin falls behind and Olivia grabs a large lead. Navigating through a tough stretch of rapids, Olivia holds off Rulon to win the challenge and immunity. Olivia is allowed to take one other player on her helicopter ride and chooses Hannah to accompany her.

Brett and Jay bond over the second chance that they both received, and then Brett takes Jay and Austin rock climbing. Promising not to slip and fall on either the rocks or in the game, the men get harnessed up and head up the cliff. They make it to the top and express a relief of conquering their fears.

Bob gets Irene and Rulon and takes them back to the Hackett Bungee Jump. With a lot of grunting and screaming, Irene makes the jump. Rulon recounts his plane crash to Bob and admits his fear of extreme sports. Rulon eventually straps himself in and jumps.

At the last chance workout, the trainers stress the fact that everyone is weighing in individually, and there is no one left to fall back on if they struggle. Cara sits down with Kaylee and convinces her that she needs to believe in herself, because everyone else already does.

They head into the last weighing in New Zealand every man for himself. With immunity, Olivia weighs in first and loses four pounds. Jay and Irene put up good number before Rulon weighs in. With a target on his back, Rulon loses ten pounds and is safe from elimination.

Austin loses five pounds and Ken loses four. Hannah loses three pounds which pushes Ken below the yellow line, but also puts her in danger of falling below as well. Kaylee is the last to weigh in and tells of the new fire she found in herself this week and how much she wants to stay here. To stay safe, she needs to lose more than 3 pounds and she obliterates that by losing five pounds, which is really nine pounds when considering her weight gain from last week.

A week after a father fell on the sword for a member of the purple team, Ken fights to stay on the ranch. Hannah chronicles her journey on the ranch through tears and fights for herself.

During the elimination, Austin can't bring himself to vote for his father and Olivia won't vote against her sister. Irene votes for Ken and Kaylee votes for Hannah. Jay repays Hannah giving him a second chance by voting for Ken, giving Ken three votes and eliminating him, leaving Hannah and Olivia as the only duo still active in the competition. Austin tells his father how much he cherishes the time that they shared on the ranch together.

Ken started the Biggest Loser at 377 pounds and leaves the show having lost 134 pounds. Back at home, Ken takes his other son and daughter paragliding. Ken's daughter enjoys that her dad no longer has all the limitations he once had.

=== Week 17 ===
First aired April 26, 2011

After their trip to New Zealand, the contestants arrive back on the ranch. Austin reflects on the fact that he is truly on his own for the first time following his father's elimination. He resolves not to disappoint his father and to remain on the ranch. Irene hopes to be the first woman to lose 100 pounds (she has lost 98) and reflects on the pressure of being the Biggest Loser up to this point.

Alison announces that they are bringing back some previous contestants this week but are also bringing in some surprises. Sam from Season 9 and Ali from Season 5 are waiting for this year's contestants in the gym. Sam and Ali recount their experiences on the ranch and with the Biggest Loser before leading a grueling circuit training session. Ali and Sam prepare a healthy and delicious meal for the contestants highlighted by a wrap with hummus, cherry tomatoes and grilled onions.

The contestants head to the speedway to take part in the Season 7 "Get Back On Track" car pull. Before starting, Alison reveals that the contestants will be competing against the woman that won the original challenge, Season 7's Tara. Tara plugs her foundation, Inspire Change and announces that she is competing in an Ironman challenge. The first person to pull their car over half a mile will win a VIP pass to the Richmond International Speedway, five thousand dollars and the opportunity to be featured on a Wheaties box. Rulon and Tara spend the race neck and neck with Austin very close behind. After reviewing that tape of a photo-finish, Tara noses out Rulon's car and wins the prize package.

The contestants return to the ranch for a last chance workout that Bob ensure will count. The purple team pledges to both make the final four, and Austin tries to find standards to live up to now that Ken is gone. Cara notices Rulon seems a bit off, and he tells her that he's searching for his own path and to learn about his own personal issues. Jillian sits down with Irene to convince her that what she has accomplished is worth everything that she's getting. She has lost 98 pounds and is the Biggest Loser up to this point, but feels she is putting undue pressure on herself. Jillian breaks through and Irene admits that was she has done and what she has become is just as impressive and she thinks it is.

Rulon begins the weigh-in with an announcement and jogs up to the scale to give it. He shocks everybody by requesting to leave the competition for personal reasons. Alison grants his request, but the remaining contestants and trainers are shocked by this development. Rulon hugs each of the trainers but gave his fellow contestants a dismissive wave as he left. He is the first (and prior to Season 13 the only) contestant to quit in the history of the show.

Bob admits his shock and says that Rulon was set up to win the show. Regardless of Rulon's departure, the weigh-in continues and Irene steps up needing to lose two pounds to reach the 100-pound milestone. She loses 3, which elicits a high-pitched squeal of excitement from Hannah.

Kaylee approaches the scale hoping to avoid another bad week on her roller coaster of weight-loss. She is visibly frustrated when the scale shows a two-pound gain. Brett expresses confidence in Kaylee's attitude and mindset.

Austin heads up the steps with confidence that he can do this for him and not for his dad or anyone else. A seven-pound loss is his reward for hard work and his smart decisions on his own. Olivia loses six pounds and Jay loses seven pounds to continue their impressive numbers.

Kaylee falls below the yellow line and she will be joined by either Irene or Hannah. Hannah loses five, keeping herself safe and putting Irene up for elimination.

Austin votes for Irene, citing his friendship with Kaylee and the way that she pushes him to better himself. Both purple team members vote for Kaylee, eliminating her.

Kaylee reflects on everything that her unexpected pairing with Brett and Cara has done for her and her father. She cherishes the time she was able to spend with her dad and the things that she was able to experience with her. She vows to be the hottest Tongan on the show!

Kaylee is down around her goal weight and introduces her to the new beau in her life – Vance from the also-ran White team. She hopes to become an M.M.A. trainer and maintain her goal weight.

=== Week 18 ===
First aired May 3, 2011

The Final 5 get surprise makeovers guided by Tim Gunn and Ken Paves, that show off the progress they made throughout the journey. Each of the Final 5 get surprised by a loved one; this means Irene Alvarado gets reunited with her mother Ana, who was eliminated on Week 1. She has lost 75 pounds on her own. Olivia Ward is united with her husband, who's done the Biggest Loser program at home and lost approximately 90 pounds on his own. Hannah Curlee is surprised by her and Olivia's father, who talks about "beating [men] off with a stick" now that she's lost all her weight. Austin Andrews is surprised by his teary-eyed mother and Jay Jacobs is surprised by his son, who is proud of the progress his father has made. Everyone is surprised by a private performance by OneRepublic that evening which wasn't shown in the episode.

The contestants compete for the chance to win two vehicles the day after "makeover" day; Irene and Olivia are the winners. When Olivia reaches a cumulative weight loss of over 100 pounds at the close of this program, she breaks out into an aria at the weigh-in. Also at the weigh-in, Tim Gunn, in his capacity as the "fairy godfather" for the week, delivers a "third wish" surprise to everyone and states that no one will be eliminated this week. Host Allison Sweeney tells the Final 5 that someone will be eliminated next week.

=== Week 19 ===
First aired May 10, 2011

First, the contestants are met with "final exams" where they show each trainer how much they have learned. Olivia ends up winning this challenge, barely beating her sister, and earns $10,000. The final 4 are revealed. Hannah and Olivia come close to falling under the line together, until Austin shockingly loses only one pound, putting him under the line with Hannah. Austin is eliminated. This also marks the final contestant from a team originally choosing the mystery trainers being eliminated; the Final Four all trained initially with Bob and Jillian.

=== Week 20 (Semi-final) ===
First aired May 17, 2011

At the weigh-in Olivia and Hannah are above the yellow line and Jay and Irene fell below the yellow line; their fate lies with America.

=== Week 21 (Finale) ===
First aired May 24, 2011

America's vote is revealed and 23 contestants come back to weigh in one last time. Rulon did not attend the finale because he quit earlier in the season. Irene won America's vote. Deni is the at-home winner. Irene came in third place, Hannah is the runner-up, and Olivia is the winner. It is also revealed that Anna Kournikova will become a new trainer for the next season.
