= Brett Hoebel =

American personal trainer

Brett Hoebel is an American personal trainer best known for appearing as a trainer on the U.S. reality television show The Biggest Loser: Couples 4 in 2011. He coached the majority of the contestants on the Red Team that season and was touted as one of the "Unknown Trainers" with a mixed martial arts background.

He appeared on the Food Network reality TV show Fat Chef in 2012, which follows overweight chefs in their struggles to lose weight over a four-month period.

In 2013, he was a judge on the online reality show Fit or Flop.

He grew up in New Jersey, and graduated from Princeton High School in 1989. He is a 1993 graduate of Claremont McKenna College in California.
