= Just Jillian =

American reality television series

- Genre: Reality
- Starring: Jillian Michaels
- Country of origin: United States
- Original language: English
- No. of seasons: 1
- No. of episodes: 8

Production
- Running time: 22 minutes

Original release
- Network: E!
- Release: January 19 – March 8, 2016

Just Jillian is an American reality television series starring Jillian Michaels. The series premiered on January 19, 2016, on E!.

== Episodes ==
No.	Title	Original release date	US viewers (millions)
1	"The Real Jillian Michaels"	January 19, 2016	N/A
2	"Comedy of Errors"	January 26, 2016	N/A
3	"Expand the Brand"	February 2, 2016	N/A
4	"When G's Away..."	February 9, 2016	N/A
5	"Meet the Parents"	February 16, 2016	N/A
6	"Miami Madness"	February 20, 2016	N/A
7	"She's Always Right"	March 1, 2016	N/A
8	"I Do...or Don't?"	March 8, 2016	N/A
