= The Biggest Loser season 10 =

The Biggest Loser
- Season 10
- No. of episodes: 13

Release
- Original network: NBC
- Original release: September 21 – December 14, 2010

Season chronology
- ← Previous; Season 9 (Couples 3) Next → Season 11 (Couples 4)

The Biggest Loser: Pay It Forward is the tenth season of the NBC reality television series entitled The Biggest Loser. The contestants competed to win a $250,000 prize, which was awarded to Patrick House, the finalist with the highest percentage of weight lost. It premiered on September 21, 2010, as the first season to be filmed in high definition, and concluded on December 14, 2010.

== Contestants ==
This season's cast consisted of twenty-one hopeful contestants, the most for a fall season. However, the elimination pre-game dropped the total to fourteen contestants as one hopeful from each city would be eliminated. Two of the losing hopefuls won a chance to return into the competition as the trainers' choice. The remaining five had the chance to get back into the competition in the beginning of Week 4. Contestants are competing as individuals, despite sharing the same colored shirts and the 21 contestants initially come as seven trios of three.

Contestant	Original Color	Blue vs. Black	Singles	Status	Total votes
Not on Ranch
Corey Pinkerton, 27, Fairbanks, Alaska	Purple			Sent Home Pre-Game; Eliminated Week 4	^{[E1]}
Montina Cooper, 35, Houston, TX	Blue			Sent Home Pre-Game; Eliminated Week 4	^{[E1]}
Sandy Dolan, 30, Fort Worth, TX	Pink			Sent Home Pre-Game; Eliminated Week 4	^{[E1]}
Shanna Masten, 38, Pima, AZ	Red			Sent Home Pre-Game; Eliminated Week 4	^{[E1]}
On Ranch
Allie Ishcomer, 22, Moore, OK	Pink			Eliminated Week 1	5
† Tina Elliott , 58, Boring, OR	Purple			Eliminated Week 2	5
Sophia Franklin, 28, Germantown, Maryland	Orange			Eliminated Week 3	^{[R]}
Burgandy Keel, 35, Eagle Mountain, UT	Purple			Eliminated Week 3	4
Richard "Rick" Deroque, 54, Conway, AR	Green	Black Team		Eliminated Week 4	4
Adam Hurtado, 26, Santa Ana, CA	Blue	Blue Team^{[E4]}		Eliminated Week 5	3
Anna Wright, 39, Atlanta, GA	Green	Black Team		Sent Home Pre-Game; Arrived Week 4^{[E1]} Eliminated Week 6	3
Aaron Thompkins, 29, Kent, OH	Yellow	Blue Team		Saved Week 1 (Yellow Team)^{[E2]} Eliminated Week 7	2
Jesse Atkins, 28, St. Paul, MN	Orange	Blue Team		Eliminated Week 7	2
Jessica Delfs, 27, Tucson, AZ	Red	Blue Team	Red	Eliminated Week 8	3
Lisa Mosley, 31, Norman, OK	Pink	Blue Team	Pink	Eliminated Week 9	3
Brendan Donovan, 32, Boston, MA	Black	Black Team	Black	Eliminated Week 10	^{[R]}
Mark Pinkhasovich, 31, East Brunswick, NJ	Red	Blue Team	Red	Eliminated Week 10	2
Elizabeth Ruiz, 31, Lawrence, MA	Yellow	Black Team	Yellow	Saved Week 1 (Yellow Team)^{[E3]} Eliminated at the Finale	America's Vote; Victim
Ada Wong, 27, San Francisco, CA	Blue	Black Team	Blue	2nd Runner Up	
Alfredo "Frado" Dinten,43, Staten Island, NY	Black	Black Team	Black	Runner-Up	
Patrick House, 28, Vicksburg, MS	Green	Black Team^{[*]}	Green	Biggest Loser	

The "Total Votes" column indicates the number of votes cast against the contestant when he/she was eliminated.
^[R] This contestant fell below the Red Line and was eliminated without any votes.
^[E1] These contestants lost the challenge to become a contestant, and were sent home. In week 4, Anna had the highest percentage of weight loss so she was back in the competition.
^[E2] This contestant lost the challenge to become a contestant, and was sent home. In Week 1, Bob chose this contestant to return as part of the Yellow Team. Pre-game, Aaron was part of the Orange Team
^[E3] This contestant lost the challenge to become a contestant, and was sent home. In Week 1, Jillian chose this contestant to return as part of the Yellow Team. Pre-game, Elizabeth was part of the Black Team
^[E4] This contestant is eliminated by Black Team.
^[*] Patrick was not originally on either Blue or Black team. He joined the Black Team after Rick was eliminated.

== Weigh-ins ==
Contestants are listed in reverse chronological order of elimination.

Contestant	Age	Height	Starting BMI	Ending BMI	Starting weight	Week										Semi- final	Finale	Weight lost	Percentage lost
Contestant	Age	Height	Starting BMI	Ending BMI	Starting weight	1	2	3	4	5	6	7	8	9	10	Semi- final	Finale	Weight lost	Percentage lost
Patrick	28	6'2"	51.4	28.1	400	378	366	356	346	337	330	311	301	291	279	244	219	181	45.25%
Frado	43	6'0"	49.8	27.8	367	340	337	317	308	294	298	276	267	263	248	221	205	162	44.14%
Ada	27	5'6"	41.6	25.7	258	240	234	224	215	211	204	198	190	185	179	167	159	99	38.37%
Elizabeth	31	5'4"	41.9	29.7	244	232	229	223	218	213	214	205	201	196	192	177	173	71	29.10%
Mark	31	6'3"	52.6	26.0	421	380	369	361	352	336	329	317	309	299	292		208	213	50.59%
Brendan	32	6'0"	49.1	33.2	362	331	326	315	313	302	298	280	272	265	260		245	117	32.32%
Lisa	31	5'10"	41.3	27.4	288	272	267	260	252	244	242	234	228	228			191	97	33.68%
Jessica	27	5'7"	44.2	29.8	282	268	261	254	248	244	240	228	227				190	92	32.62%
Jesse	28	5'8"	56.1	30.9	369	339	329	321	305	296	297	280					203	166	44.99%
Aaron	29	6'4"	57.0	36.0	468	438	431	419	407	398	384	380					296	172	36.75%
Anna	39	5'11"	46.0	30.8	330	X	X	291	286	283	281						221	109	33.03%
Adam	26	6'2"	51.6	28.2	402	368	356	346	335	322							220	182	45.27%
Rick	54	5'9"	51.7	27.3	350	314	306	297	287								185	165	47.14%
Corey	27	5'9"	57.7	45.3	391	X	X	354									307	84	21.48%
Montina	35	5'10"	41.2	32.0	287	X	X	270									223	64	22.30%
Sandy	30	5'9"	38.2	30.9	259	X	X	234									209	50	19.31%
Shanna	38	5'5"	40.3	31.8	242	X	X	221									191	51	21.07%
Burgandy	35	5'4"	39.7	28.7	231	219	218	213									167	64	27.71%
Sophia	28	5'7"	42.6	32.4	272	258	252	250									207	65	23.90%
Tina	58	5'7"	41.2	29.9	263	247	243										191	72	27.38%
Allie	22	5'5"	53.6	41.3	322	305											248	74	22.98%

Winners
$250,000 Winner (among the finalists)
$100,000 Winner (among the eliminated contestants)

Standings
Week's Biggest Loser (Team or Individuals)
Week's Biggest Loser & Immunity
Immunity (Challenge or Weigh-In)
Results from "At-Home Players" Weigh-In (Week 3)
Sent home for three weeks after losing challenge

BMI
Underweight (less than 18.5 BMI)
Normal (18.5 – 24.9 BMI)
Overweight (25 – 29.9 BMI)
Obese Class 1(30 – 34.9 BMI)
Obese Class II (35 – 39.9 BMI)
Obese Class III (greater than 40 BMI)

NOTES

- Week 1 was a two-week weigh-in
- In week 5, Mark and Frado lost the same percentage so they were both the biggest loser of the week

=== Weigh-in figures history ===
Contestant	Week										Semi- final	Finale
Contestant	1	2	3	4	5	6	7	8	9	10	Semi- final	Finale
Patrick	−22	−12	−10	−10	−9	−7	−19	−10	−10	−12	−35	−25
Frado	−27	−3	−20	−9	−14	+4	−22	−9	−4	−15	−27	−16
Ada	−18	−6	−10	−9	−4	−7	−6	−8	−5	−6	−12	−8
Elizabeth	−12	−3	−6	−5	−5	+1	−9	−4	−5	−4	−15	−4
Mark	−41	−11	−8	−9	−16	−7	−12	−8	−10	−7	-84	
Brendan	−31	−5	−11	−2	−11	−4	−18	−8	−7	−5	-15	
Lisa	−16	−5	−7	−8	−8	−2	−8	−6	0	-37		
Jessica	−14	−7	−7	−6	−4	−4	−12	−1	-37			
Jesse	−30	−10	−8	−16	−9	+1	−17	-77				
Aaron	−30	−7	−12	−12	−9	−14	−4	-84				
Anna	-39			−5	−3	−2	-60					
Adam	−34	−12	−10	−11	−13	-102						
Rick	−36	−8	−9	−10	-102							
Corey	-37			-47								
Montina	-17			-47								
Sandy	-25			-25								
Shanna	-21			-30								
Burgandy	−12	−1	−5	-46								
Sophia	−14	−6	−2	-43								
Tina	−16	−4	-52									
Allie	−17	-57										

Notes

- Frado's 22 pound weight loss in week 7 was displayed as a −18 due to his weight gain the previous week.
- Elizabeth's 9 pound weight loss in week 7 was displayed as a −8 due to her weight gain the previous week.
- Jesse's 17 pound weight loss in week 7 was displayed as a −16 due to his weight gain the previous week.

=== Weigh-in percentages history ===
Contestant	Week										Semi- final	Finale
Contestant	1	2	3	4	5	6	7	8	9	10	Semi- final	Finale
Patrick	−5.50%	−3.17%	−2.73%	−2.81%	−2.60%	−2.08%	−5.76%	−3.22%	−3.32%	−4.12%	−12.54%	−10.25%
Frado	−7.36%	−0.88%	−5.93%	−2.84%	−4.55%	+1.36%	−7.38%	−3.26%	−1.50%	−5.70%	−10.89%	−7.24%
Ada	−6.98%	−2.50%	−4.27%	−4.02%	−1.86%	−3.32%	−2.94%	−4.04%	−2.63%	−3.24%	−6.70%	−4.79%
Elizabeth	−4.92%	−1.29%	−2.62%	−2.24%	−2.29%	+0.47%	−4.21%	−1.95%	−2.49%	−2.04%	−7.81%	-2.26%
Mark	−9.74%	−2.89%	−2.17%	−2.49%	−4.55%	−2.08%	−3.65%	−2.39%	−3.24%	−2.34%	-28.77%	
Brendan	−8.56%	−1.51%	−3.37%	−0.63%	−3.51%	−1.32%	−6.04%	−2.86%	−2.57%	−1.89%	-5.77%	
Lisa	−5.56%	−1.84%	−2.62%	−3.08%	−3.17%	−0.82%	−3.31%	−2.56%	0.00%	-16.23%		
Jessica	−4.96%	−2.61%	−2.68%	−2.36%	−1.61%	−1.64%	−5.00%	−0.44%	-16.30%			
Jesse	−8.13%	−2.95%	−2.43%	−4.98%	−2.95%	+0.34%	−5.72%	-27.50%				
Aaron	−6.41%	−1.60%	−2.78%	−2.86%	−2.21%	−3.52%	−1.04%	-22.11%				
Anna	-11.82%			−1.72%	−1.05%	−0.71%	-21.35%					
Adam	−8.46%	−3.26%	−2.81%	−3.18%	−3.88%	-31.68%						
Rick	−10.29%	−2.55%	−2.94%	−3.37%	-35.54%							
Sandy	-9.65%			-11.54%								
Corey	-9.46%			-12.02%								
Shanna	-8.68%			-13.57%								
Montina	-5.92%			-15.93%								
Burgandy	−5.19%	−0.46%	−2.29%	-21.60%								
Sophia	−5.15%	−2.33%	−0.79%	-17.20%								
Tina	−6.08%	−1.62%	-21.40%									
Allie	−5.28%	-18.69%										

Notes

- Frado's −7.38% pound weight loss in week 7 was displayed as a −6.12% due to his weight gain the previous week.
- Elizabeth's −4.21% pound weight loss in week 7 was displayed as a −3.74% due to her weight gain the previous week.
- Jesse's −5.72% pound weight loss in week 7 was displayed as a −5.39% due to his weight gain the previous week.

=== Total Overall Percentage of Weight Loss (Biggest Loser on Campus) ===
Bold denotes who has the overall highest percentage of weight loss as of that week

Contestant	Week										Semi- final
Contestant	1	2	3	4	5	6	7	8	9	10	Semi- final
Patrick	−5.50%	−8.50%	−11.00%	−13.50%	−15.75%	−17.50%	−22.25%	−24.75%	−27.25%	−30.25%	−39.00%
Frado	−7.36%	−8.17%	−13.62%	−16.08%	−19.89%	−18.80%	**-24.80%**	**-27.25%**	−28.34%	**-32.43%**	**-39.78%**
Ada	−6.98%	−9.30%	−13.18%	−16.67%	−18.22%	−20.93%	−23.26%	−26.36%	−28.29%	−30.62%	−35.27%
Elizabeth	−4.92%	−6.15%	−8.61%	−10.66%	−12.70%	−12.30%	−15.98%	−17.62%	−19.67%	−21.31%	−27.46%
Mark	−9.74%	−12.35%	−14.35%	−16.39%	**-20.19%**	**-21.85%**	−24.70%	−26.60%	**-28.98%**	−30.64%	
Brendan	−8.56%	−9.94%	−12.98%	−13.54%	−16.57%	−17.68%	−22.65%	−24.86%	−26.80%	−28.18%	
Lisa	−5.56%	−7.29%	−9.72%	−12.50%	−15.28%	−15.97%	−18.75%	−20.83%	−20.83%		
Jessica	−4.96%	−7.45%	−9.93%	−12.06%	−13.48%	−14.89%	−19.15%	−19.50%			
Jesse	−8.13%	−10.84%	−13.00%	−17.34%	−19.78%	−19.51%	−24.12%				
Aaron	−6.41%	−7.91%	−10.47%	−13.03%	−14.96%	−17.95%	−18.80%				
Anna	-11.82%			−13.33%	−14.24%	−14.85%					
Adam	−8.46%	−11.44%	−13.93%	−16.67%	−19.90%						
Rick	**-10.29%**	**-12.57%**	**-15.14%**	**-18.00%**							
Corey	-9.46%										
Montina	-5.92%										
Sandy	-9.65%										
Shanna	-8.68%										
Burgandy	−5.19%	−5.63%	−7.79%								
Sophia	−5.15%	−7.35%	−8.09%								
Tina	−6.08%	−7.60%									
Allie	−5.28%										

== Elimination voting history ==
Contestant	Week 1	Week 2	Week 3	Week 4	Week 5	Week 6	Week 7	Week 8	Week 9	Week 10	Finale
Eliminated	Allie	Tina	Sophia	Corey	Adam	Anna	Aaron	Jessica	Lisa	Brendan	Elizabeth
Eliminated	Allie	Tina	Sophia	Montina	Adam	Anna	Aaron	Jessica	Lisa	Brendan	Elizabeth
Eliminated	Allie	Tina	Sophia	Sandy	Adam	Anna	Aaron	Jessica	Lisa	Brendan	Elizabeth
Eliminated	Allie	Tina	Sophia	Shanna	Adam	Anna	Aaron	Jessica	Lisa	Brendan	Elizabeth
Eliminated	Allie	Tina	Burgandy	Rick	Adam	Anna	Jesse	Jessica	Lisa	Mark	Elizabeth
Patrick	+	Tina	?	X	X	Anna	Aaron & Jesse	?	?	Mark	Biggest Loser
Frado	Allie	Tina	Burgandy	Rick	X	?	Aaron & Jesse	Jessica	X	?	Finalist
Ada	Tina	?	Elizabeth	Rick	X	Anna	Lisa & Elizabeth	?	?	Mark	X
Elizabeth	×	×	X	Rick	X	?	X	X	Lisa	X	Eliminated
Mark	Allie	Tina	×	X	Adam	X	Aaron & Jesse	?	Lisa	X	Eliminated Week 10
Brendan	Allie	×	Burgandy	Rick	Adam	Anna	Aaron & Jesse	Jessica	Lisa	X	Eliminated Week 10
Lisa	×	X	×	X	Jessica	X	X	Jessica	X	Eliminated Week 9	
Jessica	×	Tina	+	X	Adam	X	Lisa & Elizabeth	X	Eliminated Week 8		
Aaron	Tina	+	?	X	Jessica	X	X	Eliminated Week 7			
Jesse	Allie	Tina	×	X	Adam	X	X	Eliminated Week 7			
Anna	X	X	X	Elizabeth	X	Elizabeth	Eliminated Week 6				
Adam	?	?	Burgandy	X	Jessica	Eliminated Week 5					
Rick	Allie	?	Burgandy	Elizabeth	Eliminated Week 4						
Corey	X	X	X	X	Eliminated Start of Week 4						
Montina	X	X	X	X	Eliminated Start of Week 4						
Sandy	X	X	X	X	Eliminated Start of Week 4						
Shanna	X	X	X	X	Eliminated Start of Week 4						
Burgandy	×	×	X	Eliminated Week 3							
Sophia	×	×	X	Eliminated Week 3							
Tina	X	X	Eliminated Week 2								
Allie	X	Eliminated Week 1									

X Not in house for vote
Immunity
Valid vote cast, other team
? Immunity, vote not revealed
X Immunity, unable to vote
+ Below yellow line and saved by week's Biggest Loser, unable to vote
× Below yellow line and escaped elimination, unable to vote
X Below yellow line and lost challenge or did not compete in challenge, unable to vote
X Below red line, automatically eliminated
X Lost arrive at ranch weigh-in, was automatically eliminated
X Not in elimination, unable to vote
Eliminated or not in house
Last person eliminated (at the finale) via public voting
Valid vote cast
? Vote not revealed
$250,000 winner (among the finalists)
X Below yellow line, America's vote

== Weekly Summaries ==
=== Prologue ===
First aired September 21, 2010

Twenty-one hopeful contestants competed in seven different cities across the country to enter the competition. Visits to each city featured three contestants who competed for two spots on the ranch. The two victors would form a team, while the loser would not go to the ranch. Similar to season nine, the weigh-ins took place at the contest in front of friends, family and fans of the show.

At each town, Alison or a contestant from a previous season led the events. Bob or Jillian also guested. With family, friends, and the whole neighborhood joining the contestants for support, the contestants faced the elimination challenge after the weigh-ins. Depending on the city, the contestants either had to perform a 500-step stepping challenge or run a mile. The first fourteen contestants to complete the challenge would earn a spot as a contestant. Ada, Adam, Allie, Brendan, Burgandy, Frado, Jesse, Jessica, Lisa, Mark, Patrick, Rick, Sophia, and Tina earned a spot and became the first fourteen contestants of season ten. Aaron, Anna, Corey, Elizabeth, Montina, Sandy, and Shanna lost the challenge and were eliminated. However, as hinted in the extended season preview, the seven eliminated contestants may return to the game in the future.

=== Week 1 ===
First aired September 28, 2010

The contestants arrive at the ranch, and are surprised to discover that Bob and Jillian were each allowed to select one of the losers of the contests to come on the ranch and be the Yellow Team. Bob picks Aaron, who showed a lot of heart and insisted on finishing his 500 steps, even after he had lost. Jillian picks Elizabeth, who had an asthma attack while competing in the challenge and passed out. Jillian was impressed with Elizabeth's devotion to exercise. They are told that even though they are all wearing team colors, they will actually be competing individually The teams then begin their first workout. They begin impressively, running to the gym and smiling initially during the workout. It then becomes very tough and soon they are all vomiting and miserable. Rick passes out and spends most of the workout lying on the floor. Then Jillian and Bob take them to the kitchen and advise them on healthy foods. They all visit Dr. Huizenga, who tells them how sick they are. Then, they are all surprised by a weigh in, which is held in the first hour of the show, breaking normal patterns. This time, eight people will be below the yellow line, and eight above. All eight who are below will be subjected to a challenge, involving sprinting a short distance to a flag. The winner must grab the flag. The winner is safe. Then the losers race again, repeating the procedure, until there are only two left. Those two will be up for elimination. Alison announces that it has been two weeks since the contestants were first weighed in at home (unlike usual practice where contestants are weighed in after one week), so big weight losses are expected (5 contestants lost 30+ lbs and 1 contestant lost 41 lbs, the most contestants to lose more than 30 lbs the first weigh-in). The results of the weigh-in are that 7 of the 8 men are above the yellow line, and seven of the eight women are below the yellow line. The Week's Biggest Loser (who, this week, is Rick), gets to "save" one of the people below the yellow line, and he picks Patrick, the only man, meaning that Patrick does not have to compete in the elimination challenge. The women then race, with Burgandy and Jessica getting into a heated argument. Burgandy accuses Jessica of deliberately elbowing into her lane and blocking her, and Jessica vehemently insists it was an accident. After all of the races are run, the youngest contestant (Allie) and the oldest contestant (Tina), are left for the vote. Dr. Huizenga had previously told Allie that due to her gastric band procedure, she lost a lot of muscle as well as fat, and then when she got fat again, she gained only fat, not muscle. This meant that she had the largest percentage of body fat of anyone there. At the vote, Allie is voted off.

Video from home shows Allie having a strained relationship with her mother (Allie asked that her mother remove all chocolate from the house, one of her largest temptations, but her mother didn't do so). Allie then seeks help from outside her family and links up with fellow Oklahoman Danny Cahill, the Season 8 winner, for future workouts.

=== Week 2 ===
First aired October 5, 2010

The morning after Allie is voted off, the contestants assemble and Tina makes an announcement. She asks that, despite the fact that she fought hard to stay this week, she be voted off this week, because she recently withdrew $16,000 from her 401K in order to take her family on the vacation of a lifetime, which she will miss unless she gets voted off. The other contestants react with anger. It was a painful decision to vote off Allie, a 300-pound 22-year-old, and thousands of people wish they were on the show, and now Tina is wasting that opportunity. She starts crying. Lisa is particularly upset, and says now she's going to have to go home early so that she can help Allie, since they live 10 miles apart and Allie has nobody. The others get angry at Lisa for saying that—she has to think of herself, and her own children, and not use Allie as an excuse to give up. Bob tells the camera that contestants go crazy after someone has been voted off for the first time. He takes Tina and Lisa aside individually and inspires them to be committed to staying on the Ranch and becoming as healthy as possible. They have a very tough workout. Jesse talks back to Bob, and Bob starts working everyone harder as punishment. Frado is shown being noisy in the gym—it's what he's known for. Lisa becomes re-energized and says she feels proud of herself after the workout. Brendan, Frado, and Patrick form a secret alliance to stick together until the end. Anna Kournikova comes by and they have a tennis workout. Then they have an immunity challenge, in which contestants have to pick up tennis balls from a court and run to cylinders set up with everyone's name. they put one tennis ball in each cylinder on each trip. Everyone immediately starts putting them in Tina's cylinder, and she is quickly knocked out. Then, the men start targeting the women, who are knocked out one by one. Ultimately, Frado gets immunity. They have a surprise weigh-in, and people are subject to the curse of Week 2, with most posting disappointing numbers. Half fall under the yellow line, mostly women. The Biggest Loser of the week (in this case, Adam) is allowed to save one of the people who are below the yellow line, and he saves Aaron. The people below the yellow line have a challenge—they must dig through a huge pile of sand and find one of the brass rings that is buried. The two who do not find a ring will be up for elimination. Tina and Lisa are the losers—the two who had talked of going home before. Tina is voted off. At home, she goes from 263 pounds to 205 pounds. Her daughter, who had also tried out for the show, loses 80 pounds at home.

=== Week 3 ===
First aired October 12, 2010

The show begins with the unwelcome news that two people will be going home this week. There will be a red line and a yellow line. The person below the red line is automatically eliminated, and the people below the yellow line will face a further competition. Then the contestants go on to face a temptation/reward challenge. The contestants are presented with an array of cupcakes. Beneath one cupcake is a reward—a one-pound advantage at the next weigh-in. If not used, it accumulates one pound per week such that it is worth two pounds the following week, and eight pounds in eight weeks. Four of the contestants compete in the challenge. For each cupcake they eat that is not a winner, they get a clue. Adam wins the challenge, but then he starts getting worried as he realizes that he is now a target. If he ever falls below the line, he will be voted off. Brendan in particular targets him. After the end of the challenge, chef Curtis Stone arrives to show them how to make a low calorie cupcake—100 calories vs. the 700 calories that some of the other cupcakes have. It is made with honey and egg whites, and no butter. The icing is made with raspberries.

Then they work out in the gym. Bob works with Elizabeth, who often uses her fear of asthma as an excuse for not working out as hard as she can. Jillian works closely with Aaron, to inspire him to work as hard as he can, and to gain confidence through success. She makes him do ten 2 minutes sprints, which he succeeds.

The contestants weigh in. Frado surprises everyone by losing 20 pounds. Burgandy once again disappoints by losing only 5, preceded by her loss of one pound the previous week. Ada loses 10 pounds—the most amongst the women, but, as usual, is disappointed in her performance and disparages her accomplishments. Jillian says they'll be working on that attitude. Once again, the women lose much less weight than the men. Sophia loses the least and falls below the red line, meaning automatic elimination. Those below the yellow line compete by unrolling a giant, heavy carpet. Burgandy is unable to compete due to tendonitis, so she is automatically up for elimination. Frado, as the week's Biggest Loser, had the option to save her, but opted to save Jessica instead, citing he wanted the competition to truly be against the contestants with the lowest weight-loss percentage. Elizabeth loses the competition so Burgandy and Elizabeth end up being up for elimination. Burgandy is voted off.

Then, there is an additional twist. The five players who had lost the initial challenges back in their home cities are being brought back to the ranch.

At home, it was checked that Sophia goes from 272 pounds down to 225 pounds meaning a loss of 47 pounds. Burgandy goes from 231 pounds down to 180 pounds meaning a loss of 51 pounds.

=== Week 4 ===
First aired October 19, 2010

The five contestants from the first episode who lost their races and did not get to go on the Ranch come to the campus. The one who has the highest percentage of weight loss will get to join the others on campus. All do quite well: Corey loses 37 lb. for 9.46%. Shanna loses 21 lb, 8.68%; Montina 17 lb, 5.92; Sandy 25 lb, 9.65%. and Anna loses 39 lb, for the win. As she joins the rest Alison tells the contestants that they are being divided into Blue and Black teams. Anna will divide people and one person will have no team, but will have immunity for that week and join the team that loses a player at the next weigh in. Anna tries to make everyone happy, and the teams end up being Blue: Aaron, Adam, Jesse, Jessica, Lisa, Mark. Black: Ada, Brendan, Frado, Elizabeth, Rick, Anna. She takes the unusual step of giving Patrick immunity rather than herself, because she wants to be sure she ends up on Jillian's team. Everyone thinks she's crazy for giving up immunity.

The players have a challenge: travel to different food stations and answer a question about the food there. A right answer means you can move to the next station, and a wrong answer means you have to undergo a penalty challenge. The winner gets 40 weeks of the Biggest Loser meal plan delivered to their home, and letters from home. The Black team wins, but four of the Black team members give their letters to some of the Blue team members who are particularly passionate about hearing from home.

At the work out, Frado and Brendan tell Jillian they want to throw the weigh in so they can get Patrick on their team and send Anna home. Jillian gets very upset as she feels Anna needs to be on the ranch. She yells at them to play it straight and not throw the weigh in and they both agree.

At the weigh the blue team loses a total of 62 lb with a percentage of weight loss of 3.16%, with Jesse's loss of 16 pounds being particularly impressive. The black team gets nervous seeing Jesse's weight loss. Alison tells the black team they have to lose more than 52. Frado loses 9 lb and Jillian is really proud of him because he did not throw the weigh in. Alison asks Brendan if he threw the weigh in or played in straight and he answers that he played it straight. But it turns out he only loses 2 pounds Alison asks him if he wants to rethink his answer he gave her before, and he says no and that he played it straight. Alison says that Ada had the highest percentage of weight loss and has immunity.

At the elimination Anna and Rick vote for Elizabeth and the rest of the team vote for Rick, who is eliminated, as he was a great threat. Later we find out he weighs 230 and has lost 120 lbs. He weighed 170 lbs when he married his wife Laurie, and he hopes to go down to that weight by the finale.

=== Week 5 ===
First aired October 26, 2010
The contestants are told that for the next weigh-in, only one person's weight will count in determining which team wins, and that one person will be selected by the other team. They won't know which player that is until the weigh-in. The next morning, Jesse gets up early and goes to the gym at 7am, along with Jessica, since he feels they're targets as he lost a lot the previous week, and Jessica typically has low numbers.

Later, Jillian complains to the camera about Liz and the drama that surrounds her. She also complains about Frado, an "alpha male" who manipulates everyone but doesn't want to do work himself, and who has trouble with Jillian ordering him around. She feels that Frado won't do the work, and then Anna will suffer by being voted off. Frado walks out of the gym. Eventually, though, Frado returns and apologizes to Jillian for disrespecting her. She feels she's gotten through to him a bit.

The teams face a challenge. They meet with chefs Curtis Stone and Lorena Garcia, and half of them make meals as directed, and the other half act as taste testers and pick which meal is best (not knowing which team made which meal). The winner (the blue team) gets a 10-second advantage at the next challenge. The next challenge involves a Dragon Boat Race, which the blue team has a 10-second advantage for. They end up winning, but only barely, and their reward is to have the right to refuse the first team member that the black team chooses for the weigh in. At the last chance workout, Jillian works closely with Elizabeth. She gets Elizabeth to admit that she always felt that she was protected by her two brothers, and that made her feel weak. On the ranch, she now has two new brothers to protect her, repeating her pattern. Jillian gets her to work for herself and not rely on others. At the weigh in, the Blue team picks Elizabeth for the weigh-in, and she loses 5 pounds. Other Black Team members (with the exception of Patrick, who loses 9 pounds, Brendan who loses 11 pounds and Frado who loses 14) all lose very unimpressive weights, and Bob thinks it's because they all took it easy because they figured Elizabeth would be the one selected to count. The Black team picks Jessica for the weigh-in, and the Blue team does not change that because they feel that all of their team will do well. Adam declines to use his 3-pound advantage for himself this week. The Blue Team all have excellent weight losses (including a 13-pound weight loss from Adam and a 16-pound loss from Mark), but Jessica loses only 4 pounds, meaning that the Blue team has lost the weigh-in. Unfortunately, any of the other team member's weights (except Aaron's) would have resulted in their win, meaning had they chosen to block the Black Team's first choice, they would've won.

At the vote, there is a tie between Adam (the biggest threat) and Jessica (the weakest member). So the Black team is called in to choose, and they choose Adam, the biggest threat. At home, Adam has done really well. He works out with his brother, who plays football in college. He goes to the YMCA to ask how he can inspire others, and they start an event to help people get fit. Adam feels that he has found his calling in life. He wants to go back to school to be a social worker. He has lost 138 pounds.

=== Week 6 ===
First aired November 2, 2010
60 minute episode
The teams are told that they will be spending the week with the Marines at Camp Pendleton, where they will undergo Marine training. At the camp, they are subjected to harsh treatment and living conditions, and have a little trouble with the food, which is the same food served to Marine recruits. They face an obstacle course challenge, with the reward being phone calls home. The Blue Team wins handily as Elizabeth, of the Black Team, passes out and needs assistance. The Black Team finishes the course but are practically carrying Elizabeth. The contestants came into their last chance workout and Bob and Jillian are especially surprised to see Brendan getting his hair and beard shaved off. The Teams stayed at Camp Pendleton for Last Chance Workout with Jillian. Ada manages a 10 mph sprint, briefly, on the treadmill. At the weigh-in, the results are dismal. The Blue Team goes first and Mark loses 7 lb. Than Jessica only loses a staggering 4 lb. Lisa goes up there and only loses 2 lb. Then Jesse goes up there and gains a pound! Bob is surprised at the low numbers Jesse accomplished. Aaron goes up there and loses 14 lbs. The black team needs to lose more than 28 lb. Ada goes up there and drops 7 lbs. Patrick drops 7 lbs. also. Then Brendan then Anna loses 2 lbs. Elizabeth gains a pound. Frado gains 4 pounds. Jillian, Bob, and Ali are all disgusted at Frado, who gains 4 pounds, and he swears there was no game play involved in his gain. Ada had the highest percentage of weight loss, so she got immunity. The Black Team loses and they unanimously vote off Anna, as the rest of the team is a tight group

At the check in, Anna was reported down to 250 pounds for a total weight loss of 80 pounds.

=== Week 7 ===
First aired November 9, 2010
The episode starts out with a grueling workout by Bob and Jillian after the elimination of Anna. Alison announces that everyone will be returning to their original colors, but they will not be competing as singles. Instead, they will be paired into teams of two, and one team will be eliminated by weeks' end. Lisa begins to long for home so many decide that when they have the chance, they will send Lisa home.

A temptation soon follows, taking the contestants to a fancy restaurant. Each contestant will be entitled to an appetizer, main course, and dessert, and the winner has the power to choose the new teams. During the temptation, Aaron asks Brendan that he should win, he got Jesse as a partner. Many of the contestants begin to have doubts about sending Lisa home because she got small calorie items at first, but then got a 1,400 calorie dessert, saying she saved her calories for dessert. Brendan ends up winning the temptation, consuming 3,500 calories and picks the new teams: Ada & Jessica, Aaron & Jesse, Brendan & Patrick, Lisa & Elizabeth, and Mark & Frado. Ada is very disappointed to be paired with Jessica, considering that Jessica has the second-lowest weight loss percentage and Ada has the second-highest.

The week's challenge follows, calling for each team to make a tower of sugar cubes that reaches 5 feet in height. The catch: they may only move one cube at a time to the area of building. However, at the one-hour point, Alison announces a "sugar rush", which means that contestants, for 2 minutes only, may move as many sugar cubes as they want to the building area. After over an hour and 20 minutes of building, Ada & Jessica win the challenge, and a 2-week stay at The Biggest Loser Fitness Resort.

The last chance work out arrives, and the contestants are pushed beyond their limits, due to their new teams (and due to their poor results the previous week). Aaron has a breakthrough during a workout with Jillian, and everyone gangs up against Brendan for his decisions in team-making, as well as Lisa for claiming that she did not want to be at the ranch. Bob tries to convince Lisa that she has accomplished many feats during her stay, and hopes that she reconsiders.

At the weigh in, impressive results are thrown, including an 18-pound loss from Frado (really 22 due to his 4 lb weight gain the previous week) & from Brendan, a 16-pound weight loss (17 due to weight gain) from Jesse, a 19-pound loss from Patrick, and a 12-pound loss from Jessica. In the end, after a tense weigh in, including many lash-outs from the contestants and trainers, directed at Lisa & Elizabeth, due to Aaron's poor result (only 4 pounds), he & Jesse, as well as Lisa & Elizabeth (who both lost 8 pounds) fall below the yellow line and go up for elimination, and in a 2 to 1 vote, Jesse & Aaron are eliminated.

=== Week 8 ===
First aired November 16, 2010
With the elimination of Aaron and Jesse, the contestants learn they will be competing as individuals. Bob expresses surprise at Brendan and Patrick voting for Aaron & Jesse, and is angry at the game-playing that has occurred and has caused players who need to be there to be eliminated. After the workout, Bob and Jillian reward and try to re-focus the players with videos from home. Bob informs Ada that she did not receive one, as her family never returned any messages that were left. Ada explains that she is used to not having the family support of the other players; Bob encourages her to use her feelings to push herself harder. The videos from home show how family members have been inspired to lose weight, in particular Patrick's wife, Elizabeth's mother and Mark's cousin, who has lost 65 pounds. Lisa and Brendan comfort Ada outside, and encourage her to come in, where the rest of the contestants have made a 'video from home' just for her. In the following workout, Jillian asks Elizabeth to complete the 500 step-up challenge which she never got chance to finish in Boston. She finishes easily, with Jillian giving her hand weights to use from 360; the point she fainted in Boston.

The challenge involves keeping their balance on suspended platforms (one for each foot) above a pool, where one of the platforms will be withdrawn. Round 1 lasts for 5 seconds, increasing in 5's for each round. The prize is a 1-pound advantage at the weigh in. Brendan, Frado & Elizabeth fall in Round 1. Patrick & Jessica are out in Round 2. Ada, Mark and Lisa all survive Rounds 3 and 4, with Lisa and Ada falling in Round 5 (25 seconds). Mark wins the challenge. After, Jillian takes the contestants to Subway for a nutrition challenge. The prize is a $500 Subway giftcard, for the person who makes the best sandwich. They will judge each other, but can't vote for themselves. Lisa wins, with the most votes and also the lowest calorie sandwich.

At the weigh-in, Frado loses 9 pounds to make him the 2nd to lose 100 pounds, but Jessica only loses 1 pound and Elizabeth loses 4 pounds. Jessica and Elizabeth fell below the yellow line and after deliberation Frado, Brendan and Lisa all voted for Jessica. Jessica treats herself to a makeover before meeting her family, including donating some of her hair. At home, it is revealed that Jessica is down to 200 pounds, making an 82-pound loss.

=== Week 9 ===
First aired November 23, 2010
It's makeover week, and the contestants learn they will also be walking in a charity fashion show for Ford Warriors in Pink, a charity for breast cancer research. They go to Ken Paves's hair salon for hair and eyebrow shaping, and the men shave their own beards. They then head to Smashbox Studios for a photo shoot for People magazine. At the runway show, Shanna comes back to guest speak, as she had been undergoing treatment for Grade 3 breast cancer while applying for The Biggest Loser. She reveals she now has a clean bill of health and has beaten her cancer. The contestants are all surprised by visits from their families in the dressing rooms. Ada's family did not come, but instead she had a visit from her best friend. They are all in the audience for the formal-wear section of the runway show.

The challenge involves completing laps of Angels Flight, the "shortest" railway in the world (320 feet.) Taking the 189 stairs up to the top and back down gets 5 points, taking the trolley gets 1; first to 100 wins. The prize is a brand new 2011 Ford Edge, from Ford Warriors in Pink. No-one takes the trolley. Ada and Brendan have 1 lap to go when they both stop at the top to wait for Patrick. They decide that he needs the car more with 2 young children, and would never be able to afford one on his own. They follow him on the way down for his last lap and allow him to win. Elizabeth reaches 70 points (14 laps) before deciding she couldn't finish the challenge with Patrick already having won. Brendan speaks to Ada about her parents not having come to makeover week. She says that she did not wish them to come, and explains that her brother's death may have caused the distance between her and her parents and her not feeling good enough for them.

In the next workout, Bob decides to help Elizabeth finish the challenge, as she was very disappointed in herself for not finishing. He sets her the challenge of completing 1,800 steps on the step machine to complete the challenge. She manages to finish the challenge with no real difficulty. Brendan, Patrick and Frado talk about their alliance and how it has helped them, but Patrick mentions how it may be threatened with less and fewer people on campus.

At the weigh-in, Patrick loses 10, making him the 3rd person to lose 100+ pounds and the biggest loser of the week. Elizabeth loses 5, putting her in the 100s and gets quite emotional. Brendan loses 7. Ada loses 5. Mark loses 10. Lisa does not lose any weight, putting her under the yellow line. Frado shocks everyone and only loses 4 pounds. This puts him under the yellow line with Lisa. At the elimination, Frado's alliances help him stay on campus; Brendan, Elizabeth and Mark all voted for Lisa and send her home. Lisa's family and friends throw her a party on her return, which Allie (eliminated in Week 1) is shown to be at. At home, Lisa is paying it forward to Blythe, another overweight woman in her community. She has lost 89 pounds.

=== Where Are They Now? ===
First aired November 24, 2010
This episode includes updates on more than 30 contestants from the first nine seasons of "The Biggest Loser." Eight contest winners get together for a Thanksgiving dinner prepared by Curtis Stone, while other former contestants take on the San Francisco triathlon and Treasure Island races. Also: A Season 9 contestant pops the question; a Season 7 player meets with Tonga's royal family. A player has gained almost all of the weight back.

=== Week 10 ===
First aired November 30, 2010
After the elimination of Lisa, Alison announced that two contestants will be eliminated. One will be eliminated whom are below the yellow line, and one automatically eliminated by the red line. By the end of the week, the final four would be determined. At the start of the week, the contestants participated in the final pop challenge of the season. The winner will receive $10,000 courtesy of Subway. Each round was last person standing so the last person who finished each round would be eliminated. The rounds consisted of biking, running, paddling, jump roping, and climbing a ladder. The winner was Brendan, outlasting Patrick in the final round. Later, the final six contestants reflected during the past nine weeks of the competition. They also talked about what they would do to the money. On the same night, Bob and Jillian joined in reflecting how the contestants' lives has changed since.

The week's challenge was a classic Biggest Loser challenge usually played near the finale. Contestants had to wear on their original weight in the beginning of the challenge. In one hundred step increments, contestants removed the weight lost chronologically. Once five hundred steps were achieved, they had to run a mile until reaching their colored flagpole. The winner was Ada, and she won a one-pound advantage plus a home gym worth $25,000.

The contestants had a grueling final last chance workout. This was very important to earn one of the three guaranteed spots for the final four. Contestants were also shown a flashback of their workout nine weeks ago and present. Ada was shown having a breakdown whether her workout was enough to save her a spot. Also, Elizabeth had no idea whether she would be safe from the yellow line like last week, or face the yellow line yet again.

On this week's weigh-in, there were many mixed reactions. After Ada pulls off 6 pounds with the pound advantage, she is not sure whether she will fall below either line. Elizabeth loses 4 pounds, which was usual for her each week. She did not feel confident with the weight at the week, but feels accomplished despite that. Frado and Patrick took the top two spots as the only contestants to lose double digits that week. They lost 15 and 12 pounds respectively. Mark loses 7 pounds, which disappoints him due to feeling that he had put in a lot effort, and losing a single digit number rather than double digit. Lastly, Brendan weighs in and loses 5 pounds. This ultimately pushes him below the red line, eliminating him automatically. Frado, Patrick, and Ada secured a spot in the final four, leaving Mark and Elizabeth below the yellow line. At the vote, Mark is eliminated with two votes because of being such a huge threat.

Mark has high hopes of being the at-home winner. In his exit update video, it is shown that he has lost over 170 pounds, while his cousin has lost over 100 pounds. In addition, he meets former contestant Sunshine Hampton from Season 9.

=== Week 11 (Semi-Final) ===
First aired December 7, 2010
The remaining four contestants ran a marathon. Ada finished first at 4:38.48, beating Tara's time, then Patrick at 5:45.52, followed closely by Frado at 5:51.12, and Elizabeth finished the run at 7:27.10. Patrick came in first place in the weigh in, and Frado came in second. Ada and Elizabeth fell below the yellow line, and it was up to America to decide which of the two women will join Patrick and Frado among the final three.

=== Week 12 (Finale) ===
First aired December 14, 2010
Out of the vote of either Ada or Elizabeth, America decided to vote for Ada to be in the final 3, with Patrick and Frado. Corey, Montina, Sandy and Shanna were not eligible for the 'At Home' prize. Mark won the at home prize. Ada is in third place, Frado in a close second, and followed by Patrick winning the title of The Biggest Loser.

=== After the Show ===
On July 2, 2018, Tina Elliott died at the age of 66.

== Ratings ==
Episode	Timeslot	Rating	Share	Rating/share (18–49)	Viewers (millions)	Rank (Viewers)	Rank (Rating)	Source
1	Tue 8-10pm	—N/a	—N/a	2.9/8	7.16	3	3	
2	Tue 8-10pm	—N/a	—N/a	2.6/8	7.14	4	4	
3	Tue 8-10pm	—N/a	—N/a	2.5/7	6.81	4	4	
4	Tue 8-10pm	4.4	7	2.6/7	7.02	3	3	
5	Tue 8-10pm	—N/a	—N/a	2.4/6	6.74	4	3	
6	Tue 8-10pm	—N/a	—N/a	2.4/7	6.94	3	2	
7	Tue 8-10pm	—N/a	—N/a	2.4/6	6.80	3 / 4	3 / 4	
8	Tue 8-10pm	—N/a	—N/a	2.5/7	6.87	3 / 4	3 / 4	
9	Tue 8-10pm	—N/a	—N/a	2.4/7	6.80	4	4	
10	Tue 9-11pm	—N/a	—N/a	2.9/8	8.30	2	2	
11	Tue 9-11pm	—N/a	—N/a	3.1/9	8.23	2	1	
