= Red Seat Ventures =

American media company

- Company type: Subsidiary
- Website type: Financial technology
- Founded: 2015; 11 years ago
- Headquarters: 1211 Avenue of the Americas, New York City
- Key people: Chris Balfe and Kevin Balfe
- Industry: Personal finance; Fintech
- Products: Online consumer marketplace for financial products, including loan refinancing and mortgages
- Parent: Tubi Media Group (Fox Corporation) (67%)
- Website: redseatventures.com

Red Seat Ventures is a financial technology company headquartered in New York City and incorporated under the name Red Seat Ventures. The company also does business through its subsidiary Red Seat Ventures Operations, Inc. Its online marketplace offers consumers the ability to compare and refinance loans, mortgages, and other financial products from lenders. Red Seat became a subsidiary of Fox Corporation in 2025.

== Overview ==
The founders of Red Seat Ventures are Chris Balfe and Kevin Balfe. The company was founded in 2015. Red Seat works with media personalities and brands to promote audience growth. It is known for partnering with conservative commentators, such as Bill O'Reilly, Tucker Carlson, Megyn Kelly, and Jillian Michaels.

In February 2026, Red Seat bought the subscription platform Supercast, which helps commentators monetize their content. That same year, the company signed a programmatic advertising deal with Amazon, allowing advertisers to gain access to commercial inventory tied to Red Seat’s portfolio of audio and video podcasts.

In September 2026, Red Seat signed a deal with Caleb Hammer’s Financial Audit. In October 2026, the company partnered with Homecoming Golf to expand its sports business.
