= Jillian Michaels =

American personal trainer (born 1974)

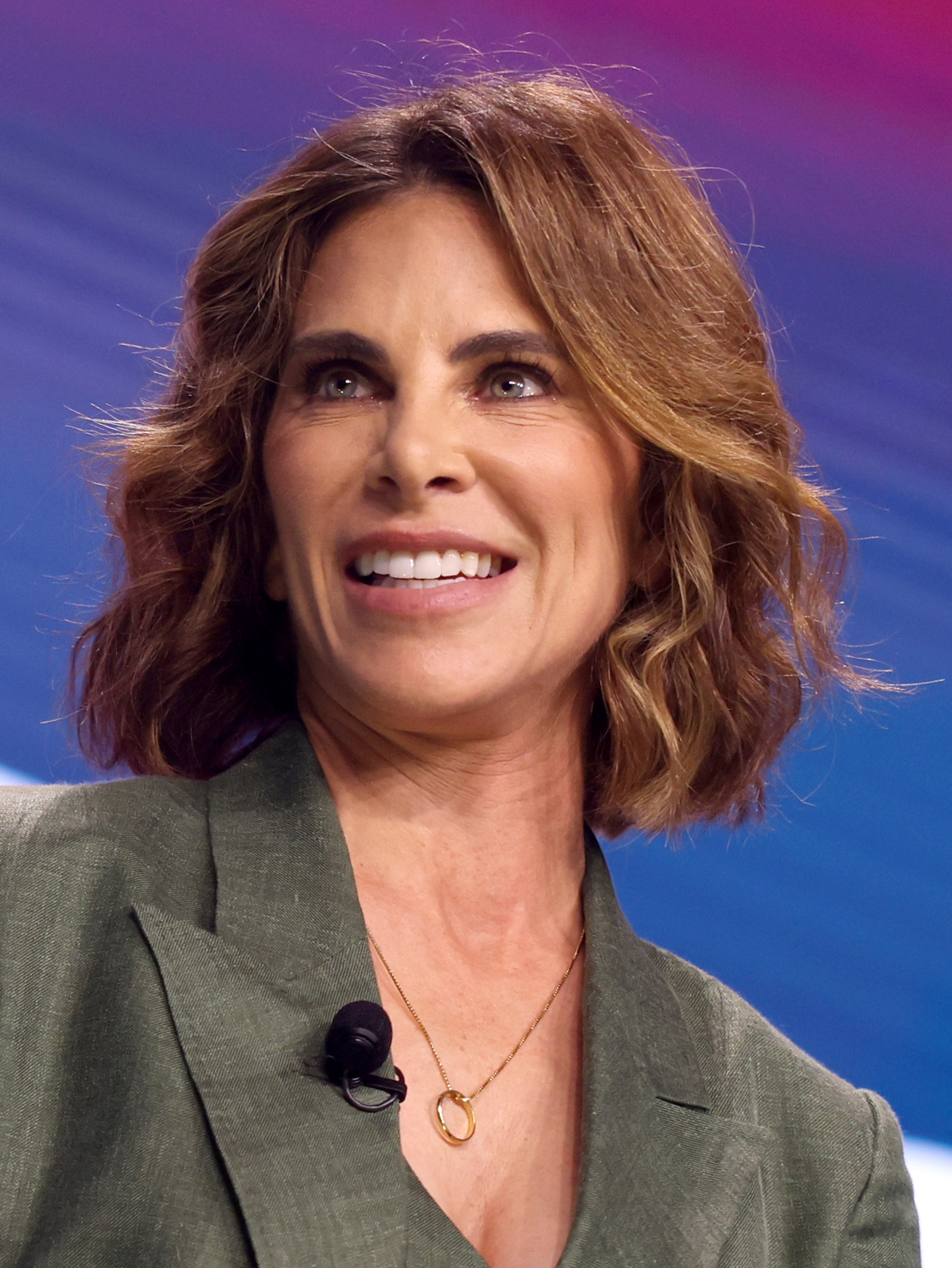
- Michaels in 2025
- Born: Jillian Leigh McKarus; February 18, 1974 (age 52); Los Angeles, California, U.S.
- Occupations: Personal trainer; businesswoman; media personality; author
- Years active: 2004–present
- Spouse: DeShanna Marie Minuto (m. 2022)
- Partner: Heidi Rhoades (2009–2018)
- Children: 2
- Website: jillianmichaels.com

Jillian Leigh McKarus (born February 18, 1974), known professionally as Jillian Michaels, is an American fitness trainer, nutritionist, businesswoman, media personality, author, and podcaster. She is best known for her appearances on NBC series such as The Biggest Loser. She has also made an appearance on the talk show The Doctors. In 2015, she hosted and co-judged a series on Spike titled Sweat, INC. In 2016, her reality television series Just Jillian premiered on E!.

== Early life ==
Michaels was born Jillian Leigh McKarus in Los Angeles on February 18, 1974, the daughter of psychotherapist JoAnn and lawyer Douglas McKarus. Her mother is Jewish and her father is of Syrian and Lebanese descent from both of his parents' sides. She was raised in the Tarzana neighborhood of Los Angeles.

Michaels was overweight in her youth, using food to comfort herself, most pronouncedly at age 12 when her parents divorced, and topping out at 170 lbs. around the time she was 13. Her mother enrolled her in martial arts classes to help her deal with stress, which inspired her interest in exercise and fitness.

She attended California State University, Northridge, supporting herself as a bartender and personal trainer during that time. In 2002, after working briefly as an agent with International Creative Management, she opened the sports medicine facility Sky Sport & Spa in Beverly Hills.

== Career ==
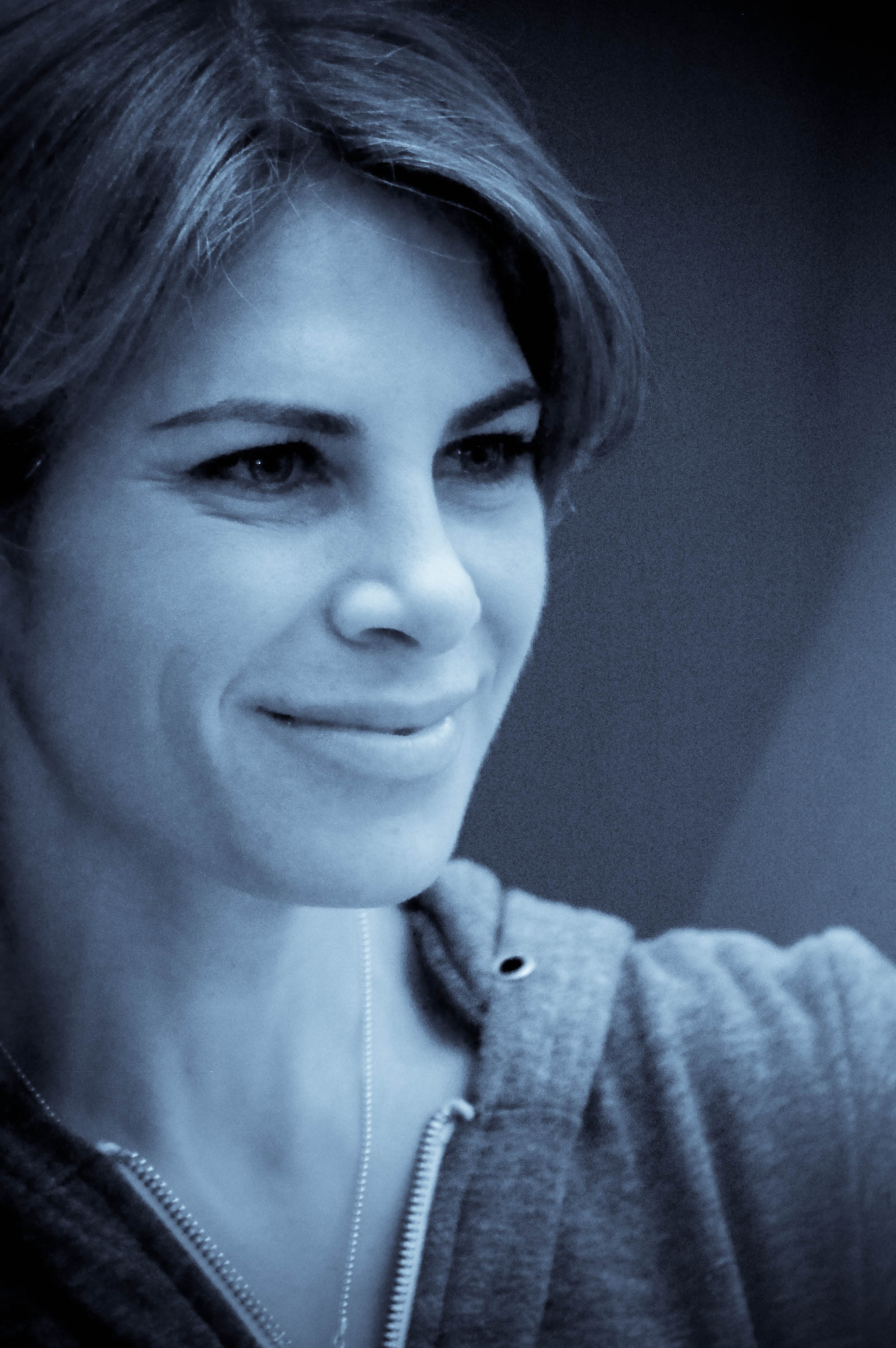
Michaels in April 2011

As a personal trainer, Michaels uses a blend of strength training techniques with her clients, including kickboxing, yoga, Pilates, plyometrics, and weight training. Michaels has also developed a continuing education series for trainers with AFAA and holds a nutrition and wellness consultant certificate with the American Fitness Professionals and Associates (AFPA).

=== Media ===
Jillian Michaels: The Fitness App is one of the top fitness apps globally and has won awards from both Apple and Google for best of in health and fitness app category. Michaels has also authored 9 books on health and wellness topics with eight New York Times Best Sellers New York Times Best Seller list.

Since February 2011, Michaels has hosted a weekly podcast, Keeping It Real, through iTunes. In December 2011, the show was among the podcasts honored by Apple in its App Store Rewind 2011, winning in the Best New Audio Podcast category. Michaels recently formed a partnership with Bill Maher's Club Random to expand her audio podcast "Keeping It Real" to video. Also in the same year, Michaels appeared in a commercial with former race car driver Danica Patrick for the Internet domain website godaddy.com for Super Bowl XLV.

Michaels launched her company, Empowered Media LLC, in 2008 and released her fitness video membership website called Fitfusion.com. Fitfusion is also associated and broadcasts on AT&T U-verse, BroadbandTV Corp, Bell Satellite TV Canada, and other TV channels, as well as Roku, Apple TV, and Fitness OnDemand reaching audiences in Marriott, Hilton Worldwide and Shangri-La Hotels and Resorts.

In 2025, Michaels co-hosted Her Take, an online talk show with an all-woman cast that includes Ana Kasparian and Lindy Li. However, in late September, Michaels walked off the set and quit the show after getting into a heated debate about Israel, Benjamin Netanyahu, and the assassination of Charlie Kirk.

Also in 2025, Michaels signed a podcast deal with Fox Corporation's Red Seat Ventures for Keeping It Real. It ended her previous partnership with Crossover Media Group.

=== The Biggest Loser ===
Michaels was a trainer on the reality series The Biggest Loser when the show started in October 2004. On the show, she assumed the role of Red Team trainer and remained in that capacity for the first two seasons. After her departure in 2006, she was replaced by Kim Lyons. She returned to the show in 2007 as the Black Team trainer competing against Lyons's Red Team and Bob Harper's Blue Team. Along with Harper, Michaels was also a trainer in the Australian version of the show from 2006 to 2008.

On December 7, 2010, Michaels announced via Twitter that the eleventh season of the show would be her last. Michaels made her last appearance on The Biggest Loser on May 24, 2011.

On September 4, 2012, it was announced that Michaels would return to The Biggest Loser in Season 14. Michaels also returned for Season 15, which premiered on October 15, 2013, on NBC, but did not return for Season 16 which aired in the fall of 2014.

=== Losing It with Jillian ===
On June 1, 2010, NBC debuted Losing It with Jillian, a spin-off of The Biggest Loser. In the show, Michaels visits the homes and workplaces of family members for a week.

Losing It with Jillian originally ran on NBC in June and July 2010. As of January 2012, all eight episodes of the series are available for viewing online.

=== Contract with CBS Television Distribution ===
On May 6, 2011, CBS Television Distribution announced that Michaels had signed a multi-year deal to become a co-host of the panel-discussion show The Doctors, as well as to serve as a special correspondent on the CTD program Dr. Phil. Michaels had been a guest on The Doctors several times previously. On the show, Michaels hosted a recurring segment called Ask Jillian, which dealt primarily with nutrition and diet topics.

Michaels left The Doctors in January 2012 after half a season because, she said, the arrangement "wasn't the fit both the show and I hoped for".

== Personal life ==
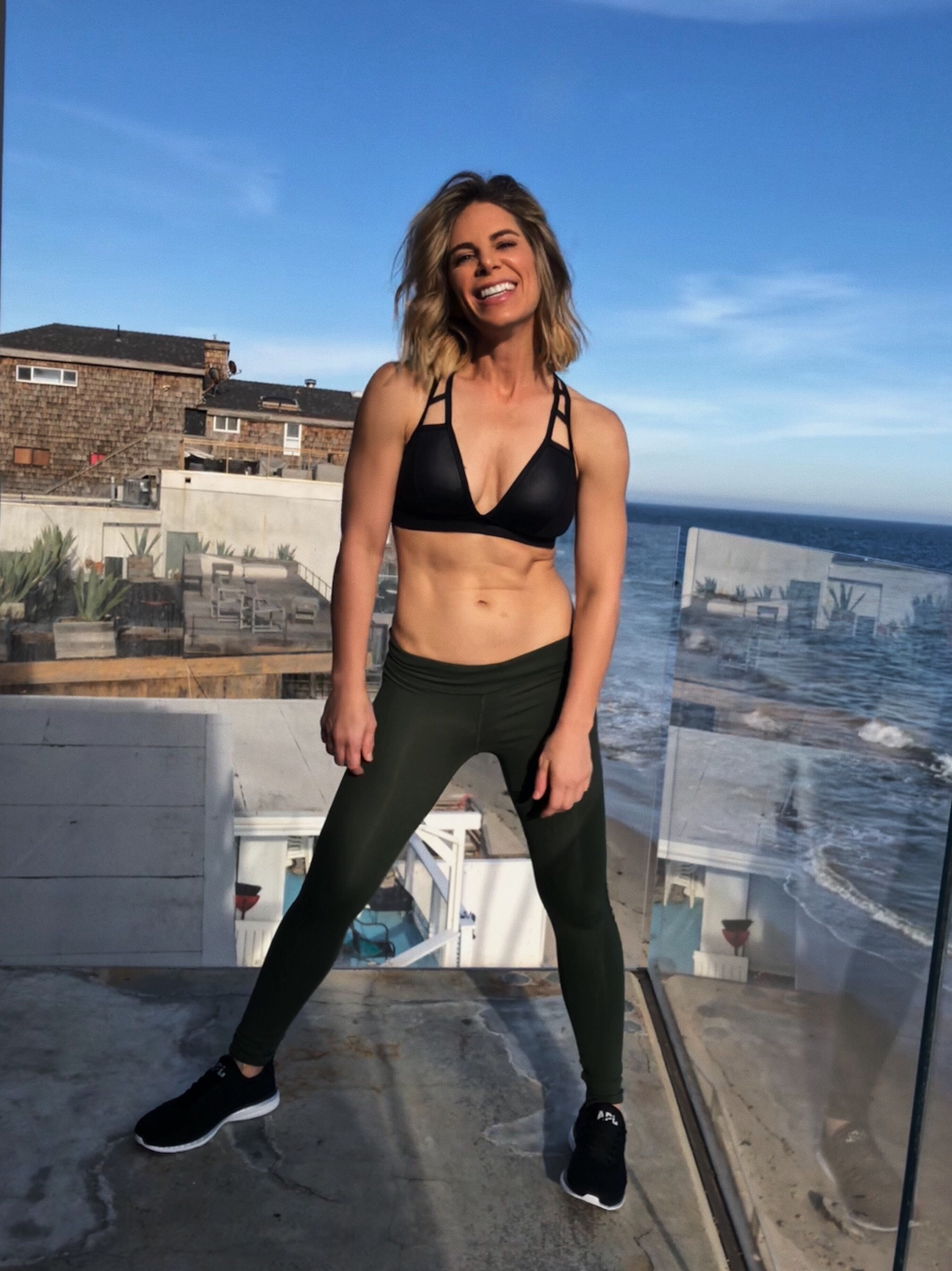
Michaels in 2018

Michaels publicly came out in 2012, but has stated, "Let's just say I believe in healthy love. If I fall in love with a woman, that's awesome. If I fall in love with a man, that's awesome. As long as you fall in love... it's like organic food. I only eat healthy food, and I only want healthy love!" She has credited the music video for Madonna's 1990 song "Justify My Love" with helping her acknowledge her sexuality.

Michaels works with a variety of charities including the UNHCR, the NFL's Play 60, Stand Up to Cancer, Working Wardrobes, Hope for Haiti, Sow a Seed, and Dress for Success. She also devotes time to animal welfare causes, and helped PETA rescue a racehorse from a slaughterhouse in 2012.

From 2009 to 2018, Michaels was in a relationship with Heidi Rhoades. They adopted a two-year-old daughter, Lukensia, from Haiti in May 2012, while Rhoades gave birth to a son, Phoenix, that same month. They became engaged at an unknown date, but announced the end of their relationship in June 2018.

In 2018, Michaels began a relationship with fashion designer DeShanna Marie Minuto. They became engaged in November 2021 and married in July 2022.

=== Lawsuits ===
Michaels and Basic Research LLC were sued in a class action suit for false advertising when marketing Jillian Michaels Maximum Strength Calorie Control, which claimed to promote weight loss by only taking two pills before a meal. Basic Research was given the "Most Outrageous" award for Quackwatch's 2010 Slim Chance Awards, which is awarded to "... promoters of weight loss schemes." Michaels was sued multiple times over the diet pills with her name on them. The lawsuits were later dismissed.

=== Political views ===
In 2016, Michaels labeled President-elect Donald Trump's running mate Mike Pence "the number one anti-gay politician in the country right now."

In 2024, Michaels frequently expressed support for Robert F. Kennedy Jr. on his presidential campaign, praising his views on chronic health. In a reversal of her prior comments regarding Trump, Michaels announced she had voted for him in the 2024 presidential election.

In 2025, Michaels appeared on NewsNight with Abby Phillip, a CNN talk show. During the discussion, she expressed her support for Trump's executive order that ordered the removal of "divisive or partisan narratives" from the Smithsonian. When the news anchor asked her about it, she said, "When you make every single exhibit about white imperialism, when it isn't relevant at all, that is a problem." Her response caused heated reactions on the talk show and social media, with some accusing her of downplaying white supremacy and others supporting her, like conservative commentator Megyn Kelly, who said that Michaels is "awesome".

In November 2026, Michaels stood by her support for Trump, preferring Florida Governor Ron DeSantis but saying "the alternative is worse."

== Bibliography ==
- Winning by Losing: Drop the Weight, Change Your Life (September 2005), William Morrow, ISBN 0-06-084546-5
- Making the Cut: The 30-Day Diet and Fitness Plan for the Strongest, Sexiest You (April 2007), Harmony Books, ISBN 0-307-38250-8
- Master Your Metabolism: The 3 Diet Secrets to Naturally Balancing Your Hormones for a Hot and Healthy Body! (April 2009), Crown, ISBN 0-307-45073-2
- The Master Your Metabolism Calorie Counter (April 2010), Three Rivers Press, ISBN 0-307-71821-2
- The Master Your Metabolism Cookbook (April 2010), Harmony Books, ISBN 0-307-71822-0
- Unlimited: How to Build an Exceptional Life (April 2011), Harmony Books, ISBN 0-307-58830-0
- Slim for Life: My Insider Secrets to Simple, Fast, and Lasting Weight Loss (April 2013), Harmony Books, ISBN 9780804138178
- Yeah Baby!: The Modern Mama's Guide to Mastering Pregnancy, Having a Healthy Baby, and Bouncing Back Better Than Ever (November 2016), Rodale Books, ISBN 9781623368036
- The 6 Keys: Unlock Your Genetic Potential for Ageless Strength, Health and Beauty (December 2018), Little Brown, ISBN 9780316448642
