= The Biggest Loser season 9 =

The Biggest Loser
- Season 9
- No. of episodes: 19

Release
- Original network: NBC
- Original release: January 5 – May 25, 2010

Season chronology
- ← Previous; Season 8 (Second Chances) Next → Season 10 (Pay It Forward)

The Biggest Loser: Couples 3 is the ninth season of the NBC reality television series The Biggest Loser. The contestants competed to win a $250,000 prize, which was awarded to Michael Ventrella, the finalist with the highest percentage of weight lost. It first aired January 5, 2010. After the sixth episode, which aired February 9, The Biggest Loser went on hiatus and returned after the 2010 Winter Olympics on March 2. The live finale aired on May 25, 2010.

The season premiere tallied its best premiere rating ever, scoring a 4.6 in the adults 18–49 ratings for that night, up 2% from the previous season's premiere. In addition to being the top rated premiere for the entire series, it was also the second best rating for a non-finale of the series. It scored a total 11.68 million viewers.

This was also the last season to be filmed in 480i, due to the fall 2010 season moving to high definition.

== Contestants ==
Contestant	Couples Team	Blue vs. Black	Singles	Status	Total votes
James Crutchfield, 30, Orlando, FL	Brown Team			Eliminated Week 1	5
Patti Anderson, 55, Lafayette, CA	Purple Team			Eliminated Week 2	5
Maria Ventrella, 51, Chicago, IL	White Team			Eliminated Week 3	4
Migdalia Sebren, 28, Sanford, NC	Green Team			Eliminated Week 4	4
Cherita Andrews, 50, Houston, TX	Blue Team			Sent Home Week 1 Eliminated Week 5*	^{[E1]}
John Crutchfield, 30, Orlando, FL	Brown Team			Eliminated Week 5	^{[Auto]}
† Darrell Hough, 46, Ann Arbor, MI	Black Team			Eliminated Week 6	^{[C]}
Miggy Cancel, 48, Pemberton, NJ	Green Team	Blue Team		Eliminated Week 7	4
Cheryl George, 50, Ardmore, OK	Orange Team	Black Team		Eliminated Week 8	3
Sherry Johnston, 51, Knoxville, TN	Pink Team	Black Team		Eliminated Week 9	3
Lance Morgan, 38, Aspermont, TX	Red Team	Blue Team		Eliminated Week 10	4
Stephanie Anderson, 29, West Hollywood, CA	Purple Team	Black Team	Purple	Eliminated Week 11	5
Melissa Morgan, 39, Aspermont, TX	Red Team		Red	Eliminated Week 6 Returned Week 11; Re-Eliminated Week 12^{[E2]}	5
Andrea "Drea" Hough, 24, Ann Arbor, MI	Black Team	Black Team	Black	Eliminated Week 13	4
Victoria "Vicky" Andrews, 22, Houston, TX	Blue Team		Blue	Sent Home Week 1 Returned Week 11; Re-eliminated Week 14^{[E1]}	1
O'Neal Hampton, Jr, 51, Minneapolis, MN	Yellow Team	Blue Team^{[*]}	Yellow	Eliminated Week 15	3
Sam Poueu, 24, Rohnert Park, CA	Gray Team	Black Team	Gray	Eliminated Week 16	2
Sunshine Hampton, 24, Minneapolis, MN	Yellow Team	Blue Team	Yellow	Eliminated Week 17	^{[R]}
Koli Palu , 29, Rohnert Park, CA	Gray Team	Blue Team	Gray	Eliminated at the Finale	America's Vote Victim
Daris George, 25, Ardmore, OK	Orange Team	Blue Team	Orange	2nd Runner-Up	
Ashley Johnston, 27, Knoxville, TN	Pink Team	Black Team	Pink	Runner-Up	
Michael Ventrella, 31, Chicago, IL	White Team	Blue Team	White	Biggest Loser	

The "Total Votes" column indicates the number of votes cast against the contestant when he/she was eliminated.
^[Auto] This contestant was automatically eliminated being the last one standing in his/her couples team without any votes.
^[R] This contestant fell below the Red Line and was eliminated without any votes.
^[C] This contestant was eliminated due to losing an Elimination Challenge.
^[E1] Cherita and Victoria (the Blue Team) were both eliminated because they lost the weigh-in against the Yellow Team for the opportunity to return to the ranch. Victoria was allowed to return to the ranch in Week 11 before being re-eliminated three weeks later.
^[E2] Melissa was first eliminated in Week 6 when she fell below the redline. She returned with the other eliminated contestants to try and win their way back onto the ranch. She won the stair-stepping challenge and returned to the game.
^[*] O'Neal was not originally on either Blue or Black team. He joined the Blue Team after Miggy was eliminated.

== Weigh-ins ==
Contestants are listed in reverse chronological order of elimination.

Contestant	Age	Height	Starting BMI	Ending BMI	Starting weight	Week																		Finale	Weight lost	Percentage lost
Contestant	Age	Height	Starting BMI	Ending BMI	Starting weight	1	2	3	4	5	6	7	8	9	10	11	12	13	14	15	16	17	Semi-Final	Finale	Weight lost	Percentage lost
Michael	31	6'3"	65.7	32.7	526	492	481	471	456	443	432	417	408	397	389	381	372	363	358	343	334	322	299	262	264	50.19%
Ashley	27	5'5"	62.2	31.8	374	353	345	333	326	317	311	301	293	286	276	271	264	258	254	248	238	231	213	191	183	48.93%
Daris	25	5'10"	49.6	25.5	346	317	310	301	295	283	274	267	258	248	244	237	233	226	219	214	205	195	197	178	168	48.55%
Koli	29	6'1"	53.2	24.8	403	374	366	353	341	335	326	316	306	297	287	281	276	270	260	259	244	231	218	188	215	53.35%
Sunshine	24	5'6"	44.4	26.0	275	X	X	X	250	245	239	232	225	216	208	202	195	192	191	187	178	176		161	114	41.45%
Sam	24	6'4"	45.3	28.0	372	354	345	334	320	310	298	290	286	278	264	262	252	252	246	240	238			230	142	38.17%
O'Neal	51	5'11"	54.3	32.1	389	X	X	X	338	333	325	316	311	302	295	291	283	278	270	265				230	159	40.87%
Victoria	22	5'9"	52.9	32.8	358	X	X	X	319						285	283	272	267	266					222	136	37.99%
Andrea	24	5'7"	46.7	33.5	298	284	279	272	267	262	255	250	243	238	232	227	225	222						214	84	28.19%
Melissa	39	5'6"	37.6	23.1	233	214	215	214	203	198	199				182	178	175							143	90	38.63%
Stephanie	29	5'8"	40.1	25.1	264	246	243	236	230	225	221	213	210	208	199	198								165	99	37.50%
Lance	38	6'3"	45.6	29.6	365	344	336	324	318	314	305	300	290	282	274									237	128	35.07%
Sherry	51	5'1"	41.2	22.5	218	201	196	190	186	180	177	171	166	163	156									119	99	45.41%
Cheryl	50	5'4"	39.0	25.9	227	213	210	203	197	194	191	187	182		176									151	76	33.48%
Miggy	48	5'9"	35.4	22.0	240	227	219	212	211	206	199	195			191									149	91	37.92%
Darrell	46	5'10"	59.3	32.1	413	383	373	361	351	343	338				309									224	189	45.76%
John	30	6'5"	57.4	39.7	484	461	451	437	427	421					399									335	149	30.79%
Cherita	50	5'8"	42.1	28.3	277	X	X	X	253						230									186	91	32.85%
Migdalia	28	5'9"	39.1	31.5	265	249	245	237	233															213	52	19.62%
Maria	51	5'4"	48.2	28.7	281	268	258	254							224									167	114	40.57%
Patti	55	5'6"	39.2	27.4	243	220	216								197									170	73	30.04%
James	30	6'5"	57.5	42.3	485	462									413									357	128	26.39%

- In week 2, White team's percentage of weight lost dropped to 2.50% due to the 2lb disadvantage. That makes the Green Team's 2.52% the biggest loser of the week.

Winners
$250,000 Winner (among the finalists)
$100,000 Winner (among the eliminated contestants)

Standings
Week's Biggest Loser (Team or Individuals)
Week's Biggest Loser & Immunity
Immunity (Challenge or Weigh-In)
Results from "At-Home Players" Weigh-In (Week 5 and Week 11)
Sent Home for 30 days after losing challenge
Eliminated at the Finale

BMI
Underweight (less than 18.5 BMI)
Normal (18.5 – 24.9 BMI)
Overweight (25 – 29.9 BMI)
Obese Class I (30 – 34.9 BMI)
Obese Class II (35 – 39.9 BMI)
Obese Class III (greater than 40 BMI)

=== Weigh-in figures history ===
Contestant	Week																		Finale
Contestant	1	2	3	4	5	6	7	8	9	10	11	12	13	14	15	16	17	18	Finale
Michael	−34	−11	−10	−15	−13	−11	−15	−9	−11	−8	−8	−9	−9	−5	−15	−9	−12	−23	−37
Ashley	−21	−8	−12	−7	−9	−6	−10	−8	−7	−10	−5	−7	−6	−4	−6	−10	−7	−18	−22
Daris	−29	−7	−9	−6	−12	−9	−7	−9	−10	−4	−7	−4	−7	−7	−5	−9	−10	+2	−19
Koli	−29	−8	−13	−12	−6	−9	−10	−10	−9	−10	−6	−5	−6	−10	−1	−15	−13	−13	-30
Sunshine	-25				−5	−6	−7	−7	−9	−8	−6	−7	−3	−1	−4	−9	−2	-15	
Sam	−18	−9	−11	−14	−10	−12	−8	−4	−8	−14	−2	−10	0	−6	−6	−2	-8		
O'Neal	-51				−5	−8	−9	−5	−9	−7	−4	−8	−5	−8	−5	-35			
Victoria	-39				-34						−2	−11	−5	−1	-44				
Andrea	−14	−5	−7	−5	−5	−7	−5	−7	−5	−6	−5	−2	−3	-8					
Melissa	−19	+1	−1	−11	−5	+1	-17				−4	−3	-32						
Stephanie	−18	−3	−7	−6	−5	−4	−8	−3	−2	−9	−1	-33							
Lance	−21	−8	−12	−6	−4	−9	−5	−10	−8	−8	-37								
Sherry	−17	−5	−6	−4	−6	−3	−6	−5	−3	-7	-37								
Cheryl	−14	−3	−7	−6	−3	−3	−4	−5	-6		-25								
Miggy	−13	−8	−7	−1	−5	−7	−4	-4			-42								
Darrell	−30	−10	−12	−10	−8	−5	-29				-85								
John	−23	−10	−14	−10	−6	-22					-64								
Cherita	-24				-23						-44								
Migdalia	−16	−4	−8	−4	-20														
Maria	−13	−10	−4	-30							-87								
Patti	−23	−4	-19								-27								
James	−23	-49									-56								

=== Weigh-in percentages history ===
Contestant	Week																		Finale
Contestant	1	2	3	4	5	6	7	8	9	10	11	12	13	14	15	16	17	18	Finale
Michael	−6.46%	−2.24%	−2.08%	−3.18%	−2.85%	−2.48%	−3.47%	−2.16%	−2.70%	−2.02%	−2.06%	−2.36%	−2.42%	−1.38%	−4.19%	−2.62%	−3.59%	−7.14%	−12.37%
Ashley	−5.61%	−2.27%	−3.48%	−2.10%	−2.76%	−1.89%	−3.22%	−2.66%	−2.39%	−3.50%	−1.81%	−2.58%	−2.27%	−1.55%	−2.36%	−4.03%	−2.94%	−7.79%	−10.32%
Daris	−8.38%	−2.21%	−2.90%	−1.99%	−4.07%	−3.18%	−2.55%	−3.37%	−3.88%	−1.61%	−2.87%	−1.69%	−3.00%	−3.10%	−2.28%	−4.21%	−4.88%	+1.03%	−9.64%
Koli	−7.20%	−2.14%	−3.55%	−3.40%	−1.76%	−2.69%	−3.07%	−3.16%	−2.94%	−3.37%	−2.09%	−1.78%	−2.17%	−3.70%	−0.38%	−5.79%	−5.33%	−5.63%	-13.76%
Sunshine	-9.09%				−2.00%	−2.45%	−2.93%	−3.02%	−4.00%	−3.70%	−2.88%	−3.47%	−1.54%	−0.52%	−2.09%	−4.81%	−1.12%	-8.52%	
Sam	−4.84%	−2.54%	−3.19%	−4.19%	−3.13%	−3.87%	−2.68%	−1.38%	−2.80%	−5.04%	−0.76%	−3.82%	0.00%	−2.38%	−2.44%	−0.83%	-3.36%		
O'Neal	-13.11%				−1.48%	−2.40%	−2.77%	−1.58%	−2.89%	−2.32%	−1.36%	−2.75%	−1.77%	−2.88%	−1.85%	-13.21%			
Victoria	-10.89%				-10.66%						−0.70%	−3.89%	−1.84%	−0.37%	-16.54%				
Andrea	−4.70%	−1.76%	−2.51%	−1.84%	−1.87%	−2.67%	−1.96%	−2.80%	−2.06%	−2.52%	−2.16%	−0.88%	−1.33%	-3.60%					
Melissa	−8.15%	+0.47%	−0.47%	−5.14%	−2.46%	+0.51%	-8.54%				−2.20%	−1.69%*	-18.29%						
Stephanie	−6.82%	−1.22%	−2.88%	−2.54%	−2.17%	−1.78%	−3.62%	−1.41%	−0.95%	−4.33%	−0.50%	-16.67%							
Lance	−5.75%	−2.32%	−3.57%	−1.85%	−1.26%	−2.87%	−1.64%	−3.33%	−2.76%	−2.84%	-13.50%								
Sherry	−7.80%	−2.49%	−3.06%	−2.11%	−3.23%	−1.67%	−3.39%	−2.92%	−1.81%	-4.29%	-23.72%								
Cheryl	−6.17%	−1.41%	−3.33%	−2.96%	−1.52%	−1.55%	−2.09%	−2.67%	-3.30%		-14.20%								
Miggy	−5.42%	−3.52%	−3.20%	−0.47%*	−2.37%	−3.40%	−2.01%	-2.05%			-21.99%								
Darrell	−7.26%	−2.61%	−3.22%	−2.77%	−2.28%	−1.46%	-8.58%				-27.51%								
John	−4.75%	−2.17%	−3.10%	−2.29%	−1.41%	-5.23%					-16.04%								
Cherita	-8.66%				-9.09%						-19.13%								
Migdalia	−6.04%	−1.61%	−3.27%	−1.69%*	-8.58%														
Maria	−4.63%	−3.73%	−1.51%	-10.68%							-25.45%								
Patti	−9.47%	−1.82%	-8.80%								-13.71%								
James	−4.74%	-10.61%									-13.56%								

* with one pound disadvantage

== Elimination voting history ==
Contestant	Week 1	Week 2	Week 3	Week 4	Week 5	Week 6	Week 7	Week 8	Week 9	Week 10	Week 11	Week 12	Week 13	Week 14	Week 15	Week 16	Week 17	Finale
Eliminated	James	Patti	Maria	Migdalia	Cherita	Melissa	Miggy	Cheryl	Sherry	Lance	Stephanie	Melissa	Andrea	Victoria	O'Neal	Sam	Sunshine	Koli
Eliminated	James	Patti	Maria	Migdalia	Victoria	Darrell	Miggy	Cheryl	Sherry	Lance	Stephanie	Melissa	Andrea	Victoria	O'Neal	Sam	Sunshine	Koli
Eliminated	James	Patti	Maria	Migdalia	John	Darrell	Miggy	Cheryl	Sherry	Lance	Stephanie	Melissa	Andrea	Victoria	O'Neal	Sam	Sunshine	Koli
Michael	James	Patti	X	X	X	X	Lance	X	X	Lance	?	Melissa	Andrea	X	?	X	X	Biggest Loser
Ashley	James	Patti	?	Migdalia	X	X	X	Cheryl	Andrea	X	Stephanie	?	Sam	X	O'Neal	Sam	X	X
Daris	?	?	Maria	Migdalia	X	X	Miggy	X	X	Lance	Stephanie	Melissa	?	X	?	Sam	X	X
Koli	?	Patti	Maria	Miggy	X	X	Miggy	X	X	Lance	Stephanie	Melissa	Andrea	Victoria	O'Neal	Michael	X	Eliminated
Sunshine	X	X	X	X	X	X	Miggy	X	X	?	Stephanie	?	Andrea	X	X	Michael	X	Eliminated Week 17
Sam	?	Patti	Maria	Miggy	X	X	X	Cheryl	Sherry	X	X	?	X	X	O'Neal	X	Eliminated Week 16	
O'Neal	X	X	X	X	X	X	X	X	X	Lance	?	Melissa	?	X	X	Eliminated Week 15		
Victoria	X	X	X	X	X	Eliminated Start of Week 5; Returned Week 11					?	Melissa	Andrea	X	Re-eliminated Week 14			
Andrea	James	?	Maria	Migdalia	X	X	X	?	Sherry	X	Stephanie	X	X	Eliminated Week 13				
Melissa	James	Patti	Maria	Miggy	X	X	Eliminated Week 6; Returned Week 11				Sam	X	Re-eliminated Week 12					
Stephanie	James	X	Michael	Migdalia	X	X	X	Cheryl	Sherry	X	X	Eliminated Week 11						
Lance	James	Patti	Maria	Miggy	X	X	Miggy	X	X	Michael	Eliminated Week 10							
Sherry	James	Patti	?	Migdalia	X	X	X	Sam	Andrea	Eliminated Week 9								
Cheryl	?	?	Maria	Migdalia	X	X	X	Stephanie	Eliminated Week 8									
Miggy	John	?	?	X	X	X	Lance	Eliminated Week 7										
Darrell	James	?	Maria	Migdalia	X	X	Eliminated Week 6											
John	X	Patti	Michael	Miggy	X	Eliminated Week 5												
Cherita	X	X	X	X	X	Eliminated Start of Week 5												
Migdalia	John	?	?	X	Eliminated Week 4													
Maria	James	Patti	X	Eliminated Week 3														
Patti	James	X	Eliminated Week 2															
James	X	Eliminated Week 1																

X Not in house for vote
Immunity
? Immunity, vote not revealed
X Immunity, unable to vote
X Below yellow line, unable to vote
X Below red line, automatically eliminated
X Unable to vote due to disadvantage from challenge
X Lost yellow v. blue weigh-in, was automatically eliminated
X Not in elimination, unable to vote due to Elimination Challenge for the two players below the yellow line
X Not in elimination, unable to vote
X Unable to vote due to single-player falling below the yellow line
? Vote Not Revealed
Eliminated or not in house
Last person eliminated (at the finale) via public voting
Valid vote cast
$250,000 winner (among the finalists)
X Below yellow line, America's vote

Notes

- In week 4, Michael received a disadvantage from the challenge. As a result, he was not allowed to vote in the elimination.
- In week 5, O'Neal and Sunshine were to have the only vote at elimination. However, because John fell below the yellow line, he was automatically eliminated.
- In week 6, Melissa fell below the red line; therefore, she was eliminated automatically. In addition, there was no voting. The elimination between Darrell & Cheryl was decided via an Olympic-styled challenge.
- In week 14, Koli won the right to the only vote at elimination through temptation.

== Episode summaries ==
=== Week 1 ===
First aired January 5, 2010

Eleven teams of couples—siblings or cousins or spouses or parent-child—are chosen this season, and this is the largest, sickest bunch of contestants yet seen on the show. Twin brothers John and James (484 and 485 pounds, respectively) break the team record with a combined weight of 969 pounds. Michael becomes the first contestant to weigh-in at over 500 pounds (526) and is still the heaviest contestant on the American version of the show. Four contestants start out at over 400 pounds, tying the record from the prior season. Unlike prior seasons, the couples initial weigh-in took place in front of family and friends in their hometowns.

Once the contestants arrive at the King Gillette Ranch in California's Santa Monica Mountains, Alison announces their challenge; each team must together complete 26.2 miles on stationary bikes. The Green team wins and gains immunity, and the Blue team of Cherita and Victoria Andrews and the Yellow team of O'Neal and Sunshine Hampton finish last and are sent home, but they will be back at the ranch in 30 days and the team with the greatest percentage of weight loss will return to the ranch. One person is forced to drop out of the challenge early: Cherita of the Blue team is pulled off her bike by Dr. Huizenga due to severe cramps, and Michael from the white team was treated for exhaustion after completing the challenge.

At the first weigh-in, the Purple team won first place with an 8.09% weight loss and Patti lost 23 pounds (9.4%), a record for the largest weight loss in a week for a female contestant. Michael lost 34 pounds, a record for the largest weight loss in a week by any contestant. The Brown team finished last, with a total weight loss of 4.75% (each twin losing 23 pounds), meaning one of them must be voted off by the other contestants. When making their cases, each brother pleaded to be voted off himself and to have his twin kept on campus. John pleaded for the others to allow James to stay due to James' bad knee—he needs the doctors and expert attention at the ranch. James argued that he has a pool at home in which to work out, and also the financial ability to take off work and dedicate his time at home entirely to his recovery and weight loss, whereas if John went home, he would have to return to work right away and have personal obligations to his wife and children, decreasing the time he would have available to devote to weight loss. James was eliminated by majority vote.

In the update segment, James had lost 100 pounds over two months; in addition, he has inspired his wife, and she has lost 24 pounds during that time.

=== Week 2 ===
First aired January 12, 2010

Dr. H. meets with the contestants, and gives each team a "medical task". In Michael's case, it means having Bob put on 303 pounds of weights to equal Michael's current weight, and see the effects. Bob talks about the pain and difficulties associated with that much extra weight. Purple watches a video of Dr. H meeting with Patti's daughter/husband and Stephanie's sister/dad, in which he discusses the terrible effects of diabetes. The Red team is shown the costs of being overweight—the things they can't do, and the money they lose (Lance previously worked as a well-paid commercial diver but his increased weight cost him his certification). The Orange team watches as Jillian eats what they normally eat, and how she is sickened by it.

The challenge involves walking across a beam over a pool. Red team wins immunity (with black a very close second). Maria (white team) is scared of water... She panics, falls, bruises her nose (giving her a black eye) and breaks her ring finger; she is taken to the hospital, thus losing the challenge and getting a two-pound penalty. Jillian works her the next day to try to help overcome her fear of water and avoid future problems. Dr. H. meets with the teams and goes over 3D MRI results (including the contestants' "inner ages").

At the weigh-in, red team has immunity, and Melissa denies purposely gaining weight, but admitted she did 'slow down' the weight-loss, in hopes of getting larger numbers week three. White team loses 21 lbs, but has the two pound penalty. Without the penalty it's a 2.66% weight loss, which would've put them in first place. With the penalty, it's 2.5%, which still leaves them in 2nd place. Michael of the white team has lost 45 pounds in two weeks, and says he will break the record of fastest 100 pounds lost and do it by week six. Purple loses the weigh in, and Patti is voted off.

In the update segment, Patti is now 200 pounds, has been able to be removed from eight different medications, and works out with her other daughter and takes dance lessons with her husband. She did a 5K run with her family on Thanksgiving morning. In addition, her goal is to be off all medications by the finale.

=== Week 3 ===
First aired January 19, 2010

It is "student and teacher week" – one person on each team is the teacher and the other is the student. Pink Team participates in the temptation, giving them control of the game. Only the teachers will see Bob and Jillian, and the student's weight loss is the only one that will count toward elimination. Andrea, Stephanie, Sam, Melissa, Migdalia, Cheryl, Michael, and finally Sherry will be the teachers. Darrell, John, Koli, Lance, Miggy, Daris, Maria, and Ashley are the students. The students are then dismissed. Migdalia (green) is very upset about the choice of whose weight will count. Bob and Jillian say they need to "knock the chip off her shoulder."

For the challenge, the teachers will unravel 1,000 feet (300 m) of ribbon through a playground and then the students will draw for which ribbon they have to untangle. But when they finish the tangling, they learn that they won't be drawing for ribbons, they will untangle their own ribbon blindfolded, with guidance from their teacher. Gray wins. Grey is also given the chance to switch Teacher and Student.

The red team goes to weigh in; Melissa only loses 1 pound, putting her back to her weight after Week 1. Jillian (joined by Bob) accuse her of sandbagging for the second week in a row; what follows is a giant shouting match between the three.

The result is that Michael and Maria are up for elimination; Maria asks to go home, and Maria is eliminated.

In the update segment, Maria, weighing 230 pounds, says that her goal is to overcome her fear of the water when she goes home and plans to swim in the ocean at her next family vacation.

=== Week 4 ===
First aired January 26, 2010

The week starts with a pop challenge, won by Red, which gets immunity, and the ability to assign rules to the others. They are given three penalties to assign to others: no access to the gym; no elimination vote; and a two-pound disadvantage. They give no gym access to John since he just uses the pool. They give no vote to Michael because there were negative things said to him last week and they don't want him taking revenge. They give the two pound disadvantage to the Green team. Bob and Jillian continue their argument with Melissa over her supposed sandbagging; Lance takes exception to their accusations against his wife.

They have another challenge, with the reward being calls home. Gray is first and Red second. Gray gets to reward three other teams, and chooses Red, Green, and Brown. On Miggy's call she tells her fiancé, "I might be home sooner than you think." Migdalia tells her husband, "I want to go home!"

At the weigh-in, Miggy and Migdalia fall below the yellow line, and Jillian says stress helped them to fail. Migdalia, whose husband will soon ship out to Afghanistan, asks to go home, and while some of the teams are upset by her request, Migdalia receives the majority of the votes and is sent home.

At home, Migdalia is down to 219. She says she gained 10 pounds when she first went home, because of her husband leaving. After he left, she "started working hard again". Her goal is to run a marathon with her husband when he returns from Afghanistan.

=== Week 5 ===
First aired February 2, 2010

As the episode begins, an ambulance is called to campus for Miggy, who has appendicitis. After surgery, her physical activity is extremely restricted; she is only allowed to walk.

The Blue Team and Yellow Team return to weigh in for a spot back in the game; the Yellow team wins the weigh-in and also receives immunity for the week. The Yellow Team also receives another reward: the only vote at that week's elimination.

The challenge consists of pulling two boxing boxes side to side 1000 times. The team who comes in first wins immunity, and the team that comes in last place gains a two-pound disadvantage. Michael comes in first, and wins the immunity. Grey team comes in second, Red team comes in third, Orange team in fourth, John in fifth, Stephanie in sixth, Black in seventh, Yellow team in eighth(despite having immunity) and Pink team came in last, resulting in a two-pound disadvantage. Miggy did not participate in the challenge because of her surgery.

At the weigh-in, Miggy loses 5 pounds, despite her surgery and the saline IV she received. John falls below the yellow line and, as the only member of his team, he is automatically eliminated.

At the check in, John reveals he has lost 104 pounds, and now weighs 380. He's now learned that it's a lifestyle change and he needs to find something he enjoys doing. For the finale, he wants to be under 300 and earn his first Jiu Jitsu belt.

=== Week 6 ===
First aired February 9, 2010

The contestants go to the Olympic training center in Colorado this week, and many Olympians guest star. The teams are also dissolved, and the contestants now compete as individuals. Two players will be eliminated: the one who loses the least percent of their weight will fall below the red line will be instantly eliminated, and the two next least will fall below a yellow line and one will go home.

The pop challenge, introduced by Olympic skater J. R. Celski, involves contestants going back and forth on a slide board 500 times. There will be a gold, silver, and bronze winner, with the prize hidden until later. O'Neal, Darrell, and Miggy sit out due to medical problems. Sam wins gold with Melissa a close second for the silver, and Sunshine narrowly defeats Lance for the bronze.

The next challenge is introduced by Kelly Underkofler, a biathlon/cross country para-Olympian. The challenge is based on the biathlon – the contestants run around a track and then take a shot with a laser gun at one of the other players' targets. When a contestant gets their five targets hit they will be eliminated. The winner gets immunity. The winners of the pop challenge get to assign hits to other contestants before the game begins. Sunshine, as bronze winner, gets one free "shot", which she assigns to Sam; as silver winner, Melissa assigns two to Sam; as gold winner, Sam gets three shots, which he assigns to Sunshine and Melissa according to their actions. The winner of the challenge will get immunity. The contestants get taken out in the following order: Lance, Melissa, Miggy, Daris, Michael, Andrea, Sunshine, Koli, Sam, Stephanie, Sherry, Cheryl, Ashley, and Darrell, so O'Neal wins immunity.

Upon returning to LA, the contestants have a last chance workout and then the weigh-in. Michael hoped to lose 17 pounds to beat the record for fastest loss of 100 pounds, but he falls short of that goal. Sam gets below 300 pounds, a weight he hasn't seen since he was 15 years old. Miggy breaks the 200 pound barrier. Melissa gains one pound, placing her below the red line and automatically eliminating her.

Darrell and Cheryl are up for elimination, but Ali now informs the contestants that with the Olympics, there's no voting. Instead, Cheryl and Darrell will go head-to-head in an elimination challenge, with the loser going home. For the challenge, their job is to keep their Olympic torch "lit" by balancing a large torch stem on their heads. The show cuts to a "To be continued..." message and then visits Melissa to see how she is doing. She is down to 175 pounds, a loss of 58 pounds. She has taken up boxing and has her kids come with her to the gym. She tells us that her struggles on the scale were real and that people just need to give it time if they have similar struggles. Her goal weight is 145 pounds.

=== Week 7 ===
First aired March 2, 2010

The conclusion of the challenge between Darrell and Cheryl starts the show, with Cheryl winning. Next, there is a contest to determine who will select the Black and Blue teams. Michael and Andrea decide to do the challenge, which involves choosing small boxes, trying to match foods hidden behind the doors. If they don't make a match, they have to eat a cookie, and if they do make a match, their opponent must eat whatever that food is. To win they have to match two golden tickets. Andrea finds many food matches, causing Michael to eat a lot of food, but Michael finds the golden tickets.

Michael chooses teams, as well as one person to get immunity. The person with immunity won't be on a team the first week, but they will go onto the losing team next week. For the teams, Michael says he "put himself first for the first time in his life." He splits up most of the pairs, and puts many of the weakest players on the Black team: Sam, Cheryl, Andrea, Stephanie, Sherry, and Ashley. He put the heaviest competitors on Blue: Koli, Daris, Lance, Miggy, Sunshine, as well as himself, and gives immunity to O'Neal. When they meet the trainers, both Bob and Jillian express surprise and Jillian expresses dismay, saying it's the "most unfair thing I've ever seen."

For the first team challenge, the teams have to raise a banner to the top of a building by pulling it up. The winning team will get letters from home. The Blue team wins. The contestants also check in with Dr. H to see how they've improved, with all of them showing dramatic improvements in just seven weeks of effort.

At the weigh-in, the Black team wins, shocking everyone, since they seem to be the weakest team.

The Blue team's votes are divided between Miggy and Lance (he has the lowest percentage of weight loss), and Miggy is voted off.

At the revisit, Miggy weighs 174 pounds, so far losing 66 pounds. She also says she has started learning how to meditate and stop putting out negative energy. Nicole from season 7 comes to visit her and welcome her into the "Biggest Loser family". She will continue to train with Nicole until the finale. Darrell checks in as well and shows the leather jacket he wore when he first met his wife; that's his goal. He's now down to 293 pounds and works out with his wife, who looks like she's in good shape. He can also fit into the leather jacket shown earlier and his goal is to get down to 200 by the finale.

=== Week 8 ===
First aired March 9, 2010

Ali tells the teams that this is "work week"—they'll all go home eventually and they won't have all day to work out. So this week they'll have "full-time jobs" and the gym will only be open from 6AM to 7:30PM. They'll be working at a food bank for their "jobs". The contestants are then immediately taken to a challenge, which has blue and black teams pulling 33,000 pound semis. As they pull the trucks, they need to load puzzle pieces onto the truck, and then at the end they have to assemble the puzzle that spells the award: "Groceries for one year". Five members will pull the semis and the sixth will pick up puzzle pieces. The Black team, consisting of primarily small women, can't even get the truck moving at the start; the Blue team has much more initial success, and ultimately wins.

At the food bank, contestants meet one of the workers who is also overweight, and they hear his story and try to give him some advice/tips on how to change his life. After work, the contestants work out at the gym, and as the week goes on, the players appear to get burnt out by the 9-to-5 jobs; they wake up at 5:30AM and don't get to bed until after 10PM.

This week, there are no bonuses or penalties to either team for the weigh-in, and the only immune person will be the highest weight loss on the losing team. Ashley achieves her goal of being under 300 pounds for the first time in 12 years, but, the black team loses due to low numbers from Stephanie (3 pounds) and Sam (4 pounds). Sherry had the highest percentage of weight loss, giving her immunity.

At the elimination, the team seems divided as Cheryl cast a vote for Stephanie and Sherry cast her vote for Sam. Both Sam and Stephanie vote for Cheryl, and Ashley breaks the tie in an emotional vote for Cheryl, therefore sending her home.

At the check up with Cheryl, she reveals she's at 164 pounds now (27.75%). She's now leading a workout group and has "found her voice". She's planning on running 5k this month and wants to be at 135 pounds by the finale.

=== Week 9 ===
First aired March 16, 2010

The week begins with a pop challenge based on trivia. The winning team goes to the Four Seasons spa and resort for the night, and gets pampered with a nice dinner. The losing team has to clean the kitchen and the gym. The Blue Team wins.

The next day is a challenge with Chef Curtis Stone present as the judge. It's a cooking challenge: make an appetizer, entrée, and dessert using only 12 (6 per team) ingredients. The winner gets a 5-pound advantage at the weigh in. Black wins the dessert and the overall challenge.

At the weigh-in, Ashley, Sam, and Andrea lose fair numbers, but afterward, Sherry lost 3 pounds and Stephanie only lost 2 pounds. The Blue Team needed to lose more than 45 pounds to be safe, Koli reaches the milestone of getting below 300 pounds and losing more than 100 pounds total. Michael was gone much of the week because his grandmother is seriously ill. Nevertheless, he loses 11 pounds, and says "that was for my grandma! I'm doin' you proud!" He also ends up at below 400 pounds. The Blue Team loses 56 pounds and the Black team is sent to the elimination room with Sam winning immunity.

At the elimination, Ashley, claiming to never vote for her mother, emotionally votes for Andrea and so does Sherry. Sam and Andrea vote for Sherry, and Stephanie breaks the tie by emotionally voting for Sherry.

Two months later, Sherry is down to 138 pounds; 25 pounds lost since going home and 80 pounds since the beginning of the competition. She also visits her husband's grave and says he taught her how to live life and enjoy it. Her goal is to reach the weight she had been at her wedding 30 years earlier, which according to a revealing how many pounds away from her goal weight in a previous week, she intends to be 104 pounds by the finale.

=== Week 10 ===
First aired March 23, 2010

At the start of the week, the contestants learn they are going home. Upon arriving home, they are reunited with their families and are faced with another challenge. A package arrives at each of their houses, containing a stationary bicycle, a box filled with cupcakes, and a DVD. Alison appears on the DVD and announces the challenge: a 42.195-kilometre (26.219 mi) bicycle race (the length of a marathon), with a prize of $10,000. The cupcakes are also part of the challenge. Each cupcake a contestant eats will add a 5-minute penalty to another contestant's time. Lance eats 17, Andrea eats 9, Michael eats 6, and the other players turn down the temptation. O'Neal is ineligible for the challenge for medical reasons.

In the bike race, Sam takes and maintains the lead, finishing first. Koli, Lance, Sunshine, Daris, Andrea, Stephanie, Ashley, and Michael finish in that order. In the cupcake tally, Sam has the most cupcakes against him at 10, adding 50 minutes to his time. This drops him to second to last place. Stephanie has 7 cupcakes against her, dropping her to last; Andrea has 6 cupcakes against her, dropping down to seventh; Sunshine has 5, dropping to sixth; and Daris has 4 cupcakes, but this does not affect his placement. Koli, Lance, Ashley, and Michael have no time penalties, thus Koli is the winner.

At the weigh-in, the Blue Team loses 45 pounds, but on the Black Team, Stephanie, Ashley, and Sam lose large amounts of weight (9, 10, & 14), causing their team to win. Sunshine has the highest percentage of weight loss on the Blue Team, giving her immunity. Afterward, although Michael receives one vote, Lance is voted off. By the time this episode aired, Lance has lost 9 additional pounds. He hopes to go down to 220 pounds by the time of the finale and reclaim his old job as a diver.

=== Week 11 ===
First aired March 30, 2010

The Black and Blue Teams are eliminated and the contestants will now work as individuals. All of the eliminated contestants return for a chance to return to the ranch (with the exception of Migdalia, who remains at home to take care of her children due to her husband's deployment). The players still in the game vote to determine which eliminated contestant will return to the ranch. Each eliminated contestant is given a chance to weigh in and then give a brief statement about why they should return. The players choose Victoria of the Blue Team to return, as she has not yet had a chance to be on campus. Afterwards, Alli announces that a second person will return: the winner of a stepping challenge, which was previously done in season six. The first player to step on and off a platform 1,000 times will earn a spot back on the ranch. Ultimately, Melissa wins the challenge and returns to the game followed by Sherry, Miggy, and Lance.

Bob and Jillian enter and are happy to see that the teams are now singles and are surprised when, a few moments later, Melissa and Victoria enter the gym. During the week, Ashley begins to feel that she can no longer trust Stephanie, especially after Koli brings to her attention speculation that Stephanie threw the Week 9 weigh-in in order to eliminate Sherry. Ashley and Andrea confront Stephanie, who denies the allegations. The rumors continue to upset Stephanie the remainder of the week and she continues to claim that it is not her character or who she is, and that she was nervous for the weigh-in.

At the weigh-in, Victoria and Melissa have immunity because of their return; Victoria loses two pounds and Melissa loses four. Ashley loses five pounds, making her the fifth woman to lose 100 pounds on campus. Sam loses two pounds, putting him below the yellow line. Stephanie loses a single pound, putting her in the bottom two with Sam. In the elimination, Melissa votes for Sam, Koli, Daris, Sunshine, and Andrea all feel like they need Sam to push them, so they vote for Stephanie. Ashley emotionally agrees and sends her home.

Since her elimination, Stephanie has lost 30 pounds in seven weeks, having lost 96 pounds since the beginning of the show and currently weighing 168. She hopes to wear a new size 8 dress at the finale.

=== Week 12 ===
First aired April 6, 2010

At the beginning of the episode, the immunity challenge for the week is explained. Immunity will be granted to the player who loses two percent of his or her body weight first. A red buzzer has been placed in the gym, which gives each contestant access to the scale a single time. If they choose to weigh in and find that they have not yet lost the required amount of weight, they forfeit their scale privileges and cannot try to win immunity again that week. In addition, the person who wins immunity will not be required to participate in the "regular" weigh-in at the end of the week, and can therefore carry any weight loss from the rest of the week over to the next weigh-in. Sam, Koli, and Melissa all express a strong desire to win the immunity challenge, working out at all hours of the day and night. Victoria is the first to push the buzzer; however, she loses only three of the six pounds she needed. Sam is the next contestant to attempt the challenge and wins immunity by losing 10 pounds, which is four more than he needed.

The same day that immunity is awarded, the players compete in another challenge involving retrieving 100 one pound weights each from the bottom of a swimming pool, with a prize of a two-week vacation at the Biggest Loser resort. The player who comes in last will receive a one-pound disadvantage at the weigh in. After a player has retrieved all of his or her weights, he or she may assist others in retrieving their weights if they so choose. Sunshine wins the prize, and as contestants finish picking up their weights, they choose to assist O'Neal and Michael. This causes Melissa to fall to last place and receive the one-pound disadvantage. Several contestants privately note that their decision not to help Melissa sent her a clear message that they did not want her in the house, while Melissa becomes even more determined to do well in the weigh-in despite her disadvantage.

At the main weigh-in, Daris and Koli both lose only small amounts of weight and are in the bottom two for most of the weigh-in. O'Neal reaches his goal of losing 100 pounds. Ultimately, Andrea (who loses two pounds) and Melissa (who loses three pounds and has her one-pound disadvantage to contend with) are up for elimination. Melissa attempts to rouse a gameplay spirit in the contestants by arguing that she is the easiest person to beat, and that if she is kept in the house, the other contestants will be able to eliminate whichever player falls below the yellow line with Melissa each week. However, the players still unanimously vote to send Melissa home.

=== Week 13 ===
First aired April 13, 2010

At the start of the episode, a pop challenge is explained. Each contestant is assigned a tray attached by hinges to a post, along with a fishbowl of quarters. Each contestant can add as many or as few quarters to the tray as he or she likes. The object of the game is to see who can hold their tray upright the longest without spilling; that person will win ten dollars for every quarter they have on their tray. Michael wins the challenge by holding one hundred quarters on his tray for forty-five minutes, and Sunshine comes in a close second with sixty-five quarters. Michael's earnings are doubled, meaning he wins $2,000, and Sunshine wins $650 because she came in second. Suze Orman visits the house to talk to the contestants after the challenge.

Another challenge is presented the next day, involving keys tied to the strings of nine large balloons that are anchored atop a hill. There are 140 keys in all, and two keys will start the engines of new cars parked at the bottom of the hill. The object of the game is to find a key that starts a car before anyone else does. Andrea finds one key and O'Neal the other. As it is raining and muddy out, the contestants have a mud fight against Bob and Jillian, who vows to get back at the contestants during the Last Chance workout.

At the weigh-in, Sunshine and Koli each lose only a small amount of weight and are in the bottom two for most of the weigh-in. However, the bottom two end up being Andrea (who loses three pounds) and Sam (who loses no weight at all). In the end, Andrea is voted off, although Sam does get one vote cast against him. In her follow-up segment, she states that she has become a spin instructor and hopes to start a career as a fitness instructor for special needs children.

=== Week 14 ===
First aired April 20, 2010

At the start of the episode, it is announced that the kitchen will be closed for the day. All their meals will be eaten in a room filled with healthy and unhealthy foods. The person who consumes the most calories for the day will be given the sole vote for the week. Most contestants stick to healthy food, saying they do not want to waste a day on game play. O'Neal eats three burgers (no buns), Vicky eats a single chicken wing and Ashley eats one taquito. Koli wins by eating 4,164 calories – almost 3,000 more than his daily limit of 1,500 calories.

The challenge this week is to build a structure using 175 building blocks in order to reach a banner suspended above. Daris wins the challenge; his prize is a one-pound advantage for the weigh-in. O'Neal falls from his structure, injuring his knee. As a result, he does not finish the challenge and receives a one-pound disadvantage at the weigh-in. Later, the contestants work out at the beach with guest trainer Gabrielle Reece, who shows them a workout that can be done anywhere. O'Neal & Sunshine receive news that O'Neal's oldest brother has died from cancer, causing him stress, but also determination.

At the weigh-in, Sunshine and Vicky both fall below the yellow line. Koli decides to send Vicky home as an encouragement to work harder, since he feels she didn't work as hard as the week she lost 11 pounds. Vicky is shocked by these comments; when she goes home, she is determined to show Koli just how hard she can work. At the time of the episode's airing, Vicky weighed 240 pounds. She and her mother, Cherita, finished the challenge from Week One that sent them home with their friends and family cheering them on. The episode also reveals that Cherita has to date lost 77 pounds, putting her weight at 200 pounds.

=== Week 15 ===
First aired April 27, 2010

At the beginning of the episode, it is announced that the contestants are going to Texas for the week to encourage people to get fit. Once they arrive, all contestants visit radio stations to promote a Biggest Loser 5k at the Cotton Bowl in Dallas. During the race, the contestants talk to the participants about their fitness goals. All participants finish the race, and in follow-up segments, three particular 5k participants' progress is updated for the viewers.

The immunity challenge for the week involves each contestant herding calves into pens labeled with their names; the object of the game is for each contestant to attempt to herd the most cattle into his or her pen. Sam and Koli work together to herd seven calves into Koli's pen, giving him immunity. Later, Michael, Daris, and Ashley decide to start working together, since their partners are no longer in the competition. Meanwhile, Bob goes to a gym to work out and answer questions from locals; and Jillian joins Season 8 contestant Abby at a local high school, where they speak to the students about health and fitness.

Everyone is present for the last-chance workout, except for Sunshine and O'Neal, who had to fly back home to go to O'Neal's brother's funeral. At the weigh-in, Michael loses 15 pounds, his largest weight loss in several weeks, and is told he only has seventeen more pounds to lose before he hits the 200-pound weight loss mark. Ultimately, O'Neal and Sunshine are below the yellow line. O'Neal asks the contestants to send him home, and his wish is granted. Sunshine starts crying like a baby, before finally coming to the realisation that the world doesn't revolve around her and her dad.

In his follow-up segment, O'Neal reveals that he now weighs 250 pounds and has lost 139 pounds to date. He is now able to do things he couldn't do before his journey on The Biggest Loser such as tie his shoes, get onto his motorcycle, and climb up and down stairs with ease. He wants to found an organization to combat childhood obesity.

=== Week 16 ===
First aired May 4, 2010

The remaining six contestants have been on campus for four months and Ali informs them that it is Makeover Week. Each contestant gets $1,000 to shop for clothes around Los Angeles, a trip to a professional hair stylist, and attendance at a concert. Having completed the makeovers, they watch videos of themselves from when they arrived on campus before examining their new looks in a 360 degree mirror. A short time passes and a mirror panel slides open reuniting the contestants with a few of their family and friends who had been hiding behind it.

Later on, a private concert is prepared for the six contestants and their families and friends. Ashanti is the guest performer and performs an inspirational song.

The next day, Ali issues a challenge to see who can stay on Jacob's Ladder the longest. The winner receives a one-pound advantage at the weigh-in while the loser receives a one-pound disadvantage. Ashley falls off after 3 minutes and receives the disadvantage. Daris and Koli hang on for 2 1/2 hours before Daris decides to give up, making Koli the winner.

The next morning, the contestants meet Bob and Jillian who are shocked at what happened at the challenge. Bob decides to work with Daris on not giving up and Jillian works with Ashley on the treadmill since she has the disadvantage. At the weigh-in, Ashley loses 10 pounds, setting the record for the most total weight lost by a woman on campus. Michael and Sam fall below the yellow line. At the elimination, the vote is split between the two. As Sam had the lowest percentage of weight loss, he is sent home.

During the follow-up segment on Sam, it is revealed that 238 pounds was his goal weight and he now sits at 236 pounds, losing a total of 136 pounds. He moves to Los Angeles and is roommates with a recently eliminated contestant, Stephanie. He reveals that he and Stephanie started a relationship on campus and they have fallen in love. Sam now wants to help her reach her goal weight.

=== Week 17 ===
First aired May 11, 2010.

Ali informs the contestants that it is their final week on campus and that there is a red line instead of a yellow line, meaning the contestant with the lowest percentage of weight loss will be automatically eliminated. They are then surprised when Season 7 winner Helen and Season 3 winner Erik (who had gained most of his weight back before revealing that he has lost over 70 lbs) have come to advise them.

After the first workout, Ali issues a challenge that was done two seasons back. The contestants carry all the weight they had lost over a series of hills and discard one weeks worth at each hill based on the chart above. Daris finishes first in 15 minutes and though he is offered $10,000, he sells it for a 1-pound advantage.

The contestants then go to a Wal-Mart with Bob to meet quarterback Tony Romo, where they go for a run. Before the last-chance workout, the contestants are shown highlight videos of their journeys during the show. The last-chance workout is really proven to be the toughest yet. At the weigh-in, Michael sets the record for the most weight lost on the ranch at 204 pounds. Sunshine loses the least amount of weight and is automatically eliminated.

At the at-home check-up, Sunshine has lost 113 pounds so far and got to throw the first pitch at a Minnesota Twins game and hopes to lose an additional 20 pounds by the finale.

=== Week 18 (Semi-Final) ===
First aired May 18, 2010

In this episode all four of the contestants (Ashley, Daris, Koli, and Michael) go home for 30 days. All of them leave warmly, and after weighing in at their hometowns, Alison contacts them through the scale monitor and tells them that their final challenge will be to run a marathon on foot, paralleling the first challenge of the year, which was to do a marathon on stationary bikes. Ashley calls Michael and asks if they can do the marathon together, and he says yes. Koli goes away from his home and goes to Las Vegas, where he hires a martial arts trainer and gets in shape for the marathon. Bob and Jillian go to the contestants' homes as a surprise to help them work out, and Bob is surprised and angered at Koli for leaving his home, saying that eventually he'll have to return to his normal life. He also talks to Rosangela, Michael's sister, about her weight. All of the contestants are seen having difficulties with their at-home weight loss; Daris is seen getting up in the middle of the night and snacking and eventually over-trains and ends up with a knee injury, Ashley struggles with the urge to go out with her friends and party, Koli relocates to Las Vegas to focus on training for the marathon and on the finale, and Michael believes that he was gaining weight. The contestants eventually do the marathon, and Daris shatters season 7 Tara's record time of 4 hours 55 minutes with a time of 4 hours 2 minutes. Many of the past contestants and family members of the current contestants appear at mile points throughout the marathon, like season 2's Matt, season 7's Sione and Mike, and season 5's Ali. Koli finishes second, but is farther behind Daris's time with a time of 6 hours 8 minutes. Michael and Ashley finish shortly thereafter at 6 hours 26 minutes.

At the weigh-in, Michael loses 23 pounds, and Ashley loses 18. Both are above the yellow line and are guaranteed a spot in the final 3. Koli only loses 13 pounds and Daris gains 2 pounds, saying that he "focused more on the marathon" and that "it's hard to lose weight when you're training for a marathon". Bob and Jillian both call him out saying that he "sabotaged himself". Both are below the yellow line. Alison then announces that America will have the vote on who will be the third finalist. Both Daris and Koli plead their cases through their confessionals.

=== Week 19 (Finale) ===
First aired May 25, 2010

The Finale aired on NBC at 8pm on Tuesday, May 25, 2010.

Daris escaped elimination which resulted in Koli's elimination, making the final 3 Ashley, Michael, and Daris.

Before the eliminated contestants weighed in, Season 8 contestant Shay Sorrells weighed in at 252 pounds (52 pounds below her previous 304 from the Season 8 finale). Subway rewarded her a check for $52,000 and a chance to double it by running in an upcoming marathon with a previous Subway spokesperson.

The ill-fated Blue Team's Cherita was the first on the scale among the eliminated contestants. Koli won the at-home prize of $100,000 out of the eliminated contestants. Michael won the first prize of $250,000 with Ashley and Daris coming in a narrow second and third, respectively. Michael Ventrella is the Biggest Loser losing 264 pounds and a total percentage of weight loss of 50.19%, breaking Danny Cahill's record of 239 pounds lost at the finale.

== After the show ==
On January 23, 2021, Darrell Hough died from bone cancer.

== US ratings ==
Episode	Rating	Share	Rating/share (18–49)	Viewers (millions)	Rank (timeslot)	Rank (night)
1	7.3	11	4.6/12	11.68	2	3
2	5.0	8	3.2/8	8.12	3	4
3	5.8	9			2	2
4	5.9	9			2	3
5	5.8	9	3.7/9	9.48	2	3
6	5.5	8	3.5/9	8.89	3	4
7	5.1	8	3.2/8	8.27	3	3
8	5.0	8			3	5
9	4.5	7			3	5
10	4.9	8			3	4
11	4.6	7			4	6
12	4.7	7	3.0/8	7.69	5	6
13	5.1	8	3.3/9	8.37	6	7
14	5.2	8	3.4/9	8.58	5	7
15	4.6	7	2.8/8	7.54	3	7
16	5.2	8	3.2/9	8.44	3	6
17	5.1	8	3.4/9	8.47	4	7
18	5.0	8			4	7
19	5.8	9			3	6
