= Gait belt =

Device put on a patient who has mobility issues

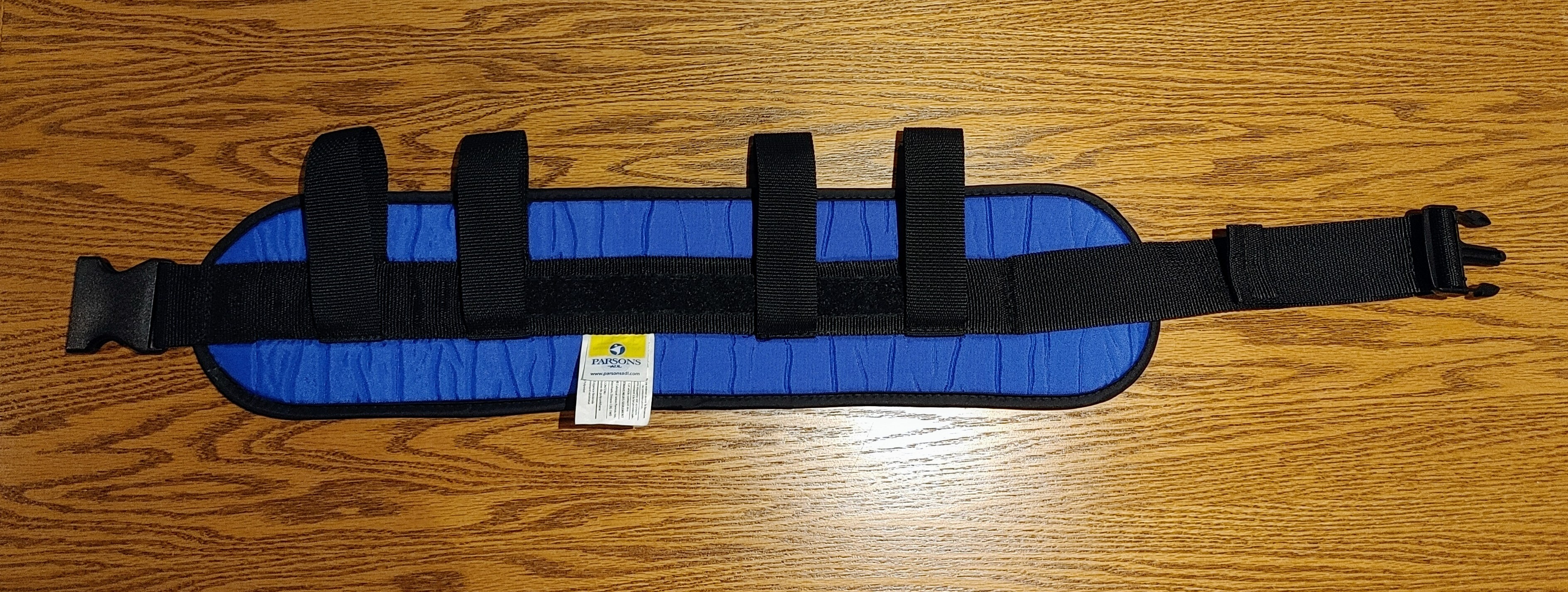
Gait belt

A gait belt or transfer belt is a device put on a patient who has mobility issues, by a caregiver prior to that caregiver moving the patient. Patients may have problems with balance and a gait belt may be used to aid in the safe movement of a patient, from a standing position to a wheelchair, for example. The gait belt has been customarily made out of cotton webbing, with a durable metal buckle on one end. Cleanable vinyl gait belts were introduced due to the tendency of webbing to harbor supergerms.

== Purpose and use ==
Gait belts are worn around a patient's waist. Their purpose is to put less strain on the lumbar spine of the patient as the caregiver(s) are transporting the patient. Gait belts are used in nursing homes, hospitals, or other similar facilities. It is a 2-inch-wide (5 cm) belt, with or without handles. The gait belt must always be applied on top of clothing or gown to protect the patient's skin. A gait belt can be used with patients in both one-person or two-person pivot transfer, or in transfer with a slider board.

== Problems ==
With the advent of supergerms, such as MRSA and VRE, trying to limit the ways germs are transmitted is a major concern for the healthcare industry. Identifying proper methods for cleaning webbed belts is an issue that most healthcare facilities are struggling with. Organizations like the Joint Commission, OSHA and the CDC are constantly updating their recommendations for cleaning inanimate objects like the gait belt. An antimicrobial vinyl gait belt was patented by Barry Chapman in 2013.

== When required by law ==
When required by law, nursing homes may be fined if a patient is hurt during transport and subsequent investigations show the patient was not wearing a gait belt. On September 13, 2017, Douglas Manor nursing home in Windham, Connecticut, was fined $1,530 after a patient sustained several injuries when staff failed to use the gait belt when assisting with transfer.

== OSHA guidelines ==
The OSHA website offers current practice guidelines for the use of gait belts. The guidelines point out that more than one caregiver may be needed, and that belts with padded handles are easier to grip. It further states that gait belts are never to be used as restraints or on patients with G-tubes, and are avoided with patients who have catheters.
