= The Biggest Loser season 8 =

The Biggest Loser
- Season 8
- No. of episodes: 13

Release
- Original network: NBC
- Original release: September 15 – December 8, 2009

Season chronology
- ← Previous; Season 7 (Couples 2) Next → Season 9 (Couples 3)

The Biggest Loser: Second Chances is the eighth season of the NBC reality television series The Biggest Loser. This season premiered on NBC on September 15, 2009. Contestants competed to win a $250,000 grand prize, awarded to the individual with the highest percentage of weight loss . The winner of the season was Danny Cahill.

The season's theme meant that each of the candidates had met with heartbreak and tragedy during their lifetime. Among notable stories, Shay Sorrells grew up in foster care while her mother unsuccessfully struggled with heroin addiction, while Abby Rike lost her husband and children in a head-on collision caused by a speeding driver. Amanda Arlauskas became a contestant after winning a public vote against Erinn Egbert (who got at-home special assistant packages and made a cameo appearance in the week 12 episode) held during the Season 7 live finale. Contestant Daniel Wright was a contestant in Season 7 and has returned to "finish what he started".

Another change to the format this season is that the two trainers work with all contestants, rather than dividing them into two teams and framing the competition as a rivalry between the trainers. In the fifth week, when teams are changed to blue and black, Jillian leads black while Bob leads blue. In the eighth week, the contestants are competing as individuals and Bob and Jillian are once again training the contestants together.

== Contestants ==
The complete sixteen contestant cast list was revealed by NBC on August 20, 2009.

| Contestant | Original team | Blue vs. Black | Singles | Status | Total votes |
|---|---|---|---|---|---|
| Alexandra White, 20, Harrisburg, PA | Black Team | | | Eliminated Week 1 | 4 |
| Antoine Dove, 23, Dudley, NC | Red Team | | | Eliminated Week 3 | 4 |
| Sean Algaier, 29, Tulsa, OK | Red Team | | | Eliminated Week 3 | 4 |
| Julio Gomez, 40, Algonquin, IL | Black Team | | | Eliminated Week 4 | 3 |
| Mozziz "Coach Mo" Dewalt, 56, Louisville, KY | Purple Team | Blue Team | | Eliminated Week 5 | 4 |
| Dina Mercado, 28, Commerce, CA | Blue Team | Black Team | | Eliminated Week 6 | 4 |
| Abby Rike, 35, Mabank, TX | Green Team | Black Team | | Eliminated Week 7 | 3 |
| Tracey Yukich, 37, Allen, TX | Purple Team | Blue Team | Purple | Eliminated Week 8 | 4 |
| † Daniel Wright, 20, Willow Spring, NC | Orange Team | Black Team | Orange | Eliminated Week 9 | 0^{[r]} |
| Shauntina "Shay" Sorrells, 29, Newport Beach, CA | Orange Team | Black Team | Orange | Eliminated Week 9 | 3 |
| Rebecca Meyer, 25, Des Moines, IA | Pink Team | Blue Team | Pink | Eliminated Week 10^{[w]} | 2 |
| Allen Smith, 44, Columbus, IN | Green Team | Blue Team | Green | Eliminated Week 11 | 2 |
| Liz Young , 49, Lewisburg, TN | Brown Team | Blue Team | Brown | Eliminated at Finale | America's Vote Victim |
| Amanda Arlauskas, 20, Butler, NJ | Pink Team | Black Team | Pink | 2nd Runner-Up | |
| Rudy Pauls, 31, Brooklyn, CT | Blue Team | Blue Team | Blue | Runner-Up | |
| Danny Cahill, 39, Broken Arrow, OK | Brown Team | Black Team | Brown | Biggest Loser | |

The "Total Votes" column indicates the number of votes cast against the contestant when he/she was eliminated.
^{^[r]} This contestant fell below the Red Line and was eliminated without any votes.
^{^[w]} At Home Winner of $100,000

== Weigh-ins ==
Contestants are listed in chronological order of elimination.

| Contestant | Age | Height | Starting BMI | Ending BMI | Starting weight | Week | | | | | | | | | | | Semi- final | Finale | Weight lost | Percentage lost |
| Contestant | Age | Height | Starting BMI | Ending BMI | Starting weight | 1 | 2 | 3 | 4 | 5 | 6 | 7 | 8 | 9 | 10 | 11 | Semi- final | Finale | Weight lost | Percentage lost |
|---|---|---|---|---|---|---|---|---|---|---|---|---|---|---|---|---|---|---|---|---|
| Danny | 39 | 5'11" | 60.0 | 26.6 | 430 | 406 | 394 | 390 | 382 | 372 | 357 | 345 | 333 | 316 | 304 | 288 | 229 | 191 | 239 | 55.58% |
| Rudy | 31 | 6'4" | 53.8 | 25.3 | 442 | 414 | 400 | 388 | 377 | 369 | 355 | 341 | 332 | 324 | 308 | 296 | 253 | 208 | 234 | 52.94% |
| Amanda | 20 | 5'6" | 40.4 | 26.3 | 250 | 244 | 240 | 235 | 230 | 224 | 218 | 214 | 207 | 202 | 193 | 186 | 170 | 163 | 87 | 34.80% |
| Liz | 49 | 5'7" | 41.8 | 27.6 | 267 | 257 | 247 | 243 | 240 | 232 | 228 | 221 | 218 | 206 | 203 | 198 | 182 | 176 | 91 | 34.08% |
| Allen | 44 | 5'11" | 45.3 | 29.1 | 325 | 306 | 296 | 292 | 285 | 278 | 270 | 262 | 253 | 243 | 238 | 230 | | 209 | 116 | 35.69% |
| Rebecca | 25 | 5'6" | 45.0 | 22.6 | 279 | 261 | 255 | 248 | 244 | 237 | 232 | 223 | 219 | 209 | 206 | | | 140 | 139 | 49.82% |
| Shay | 30 | 5'8" | 72.4 | 46.2 | 476 | 459 | 443 | 437 | 432 | 416 | 411 | 402 | 393 | 376 | | | | 304 | 172 | 36.13% |
| Daniel | 20 | 5'8" | 47.4 | 30.6 | 312 | 300 | 293 | 287 | 287 | 276 | 277 | 272 | 261 | 256 | | | | 201 | 111 | 35.58% |
| Tracey | 37 | 5'2" | 45.7 | 24.1 | 250 | 238^{*} | 228 | 217 | 213 | 206 | 202 | 197 | 194 | | | | | 132 | 118 | 47.20% |
| Abby | 35 | 5'4" | 42.4 | 25.2 | 247 | 232 | 221 | 216 | 213 | 208 | 204 | 201 | | | | | | 147 | 100 | 40.49% |
| Dina | 28 | 5'5" | 42.1 | 29.0 | 253 | 245 | 237 | 234 | 229 | 223 | 218 | | | | | | | 174 | 79 | 31.23% |
| Coach Mo | 56 | 6'2" | 45.6 | 33.8 | 355 | 336 | 327 | 326 | 318 | 312 | | | | | | | | 263 | 92 | 25.92% |
| Julio | 40 | 6'0" | 55.2 | 30.8 | 407 | 394 | 375 | 368 | 364 | | | | | | | | | 227 | 180 | 44.23% |
| Antoine | 23 | 6'0" | 49.8 | 29.2 | 367 | 349 | 341 | 330 | | | | | | | | | | 215 | 152 | 41.42% |
| Sean | 29 | 6'2" | 57.0 | 37.1 | 444 | 422 | 411 | 405 | | | | | | | | | | 289 | 155 | 34.91% |
| Alexandra | 20 | 5'8" | 47.0 | 33.1 | 309 | 296 | | | | | | | | | | | | 218 | 91 | 29.45% |

Winners
$250,000 Winner (among the finalists)
$100,000 Winner (among the eliminated contestants)

Standings
Week's Biggest Loser (Team or Individuals)
Week's Biggest Loser & Immunity
Immunity (Challenge or Weigh-In)
Eliminated at the Finale

BMI
Underweight (less than 18.5 BMI)
Normal (18.5 – 24.9 BMI)
Overweight (25 – 29.9 BMI)
Obese Class I (30 – 34.9 BMI)
Obese Class II (35 – 39.9 BMI)
Obese Class III (greater than 40 BMI)

Notes

^* – Tracey was still in the hospital and was weighed in at the hospital in Week 1. However, on the ranch, Coach Mo represented their team with the power of Tracey in his hands.

=== Weigh-in figures history ===
| Contestant | Week | | | | | | | | | | | Semi- final | Finale |
| Contestant | 1 | 2 | 3 | 4 | 5 | 6 | 7 | 8 | 9 | 10 | 11 | Semi- final | Finale |
|---|---|---|---|---|---|---|---|---|---|---|---|---|---|
| Danny | −24 | −12 | −4 | −8 | −10 | −15 | −12 | −12 | −17 | −12 | −16 | −59 | −38 |
| Rudy | −28 | −14 | −12 | −11 | −8 | −14 | −14 | −9 | −8 | −16 | −12 | −43 | −45 |
| Amanda | −6 | −4 | −5 | −5 | −6 | −6 | −4 | −7 | −5 | −9 | −7 | −16 | −7 |
| Liz | −10 | −10 | −4 | −3 | −8 | −4 | −7 | −3 | −12 | −3 | −5 | −16 | -6 |
| Allen | −19 | −10 | −4 | −7 | −7 | −8 | −8 | −9 | −10 | −5 | −8 | -21 | |
| Rebecca | −18 | −6 | −7 | −4 | −7 | −5 | −9 | −4 | −10 | −3 | -66 | | |
| Shay | −17 | −16 | −6 | −5 | −16 | −5 | −9 | −9 | −17 | -72 | | | |
| Daniel | −12 | −7 | −6 | 0 | −11 | +1 | −5 | −11 | −5 | -55 | | | |
| Tracey | −12 | −10 | −11 | −4 | −7 | −4 | −5 | −3 | -62 | | | | |
| Abby | −15 | −11 | −5 | −3 | −5 | −4 | −3 | -54 | | | | | |
| Dina | −8 | −8 | −3 | −5 | −6 | −5 | -44 | | | | | | |
| Coach Mo | −19 | −9 | −1 | −8 | −6 | -49 | | | | | | | |
| Julio | −13 | −19 | −7 | −4 | -137 | | | | | | | | |
| Antoine | −18 | −8 | −11 | -115 | | | | | | | | | |
| Sean | −22 | −11 | −6 | -116 | | | | | | | | | |
| Alexandra | −13 | -78 | | | | | | | | | | | |

=== Weigh-in percentages history ===
| Contestant | Week | | | | | | | | | | | Semi- final | Finale |
|---|---|---|---|---|---|---|---|---|---|---|---|---|---|
| Danny | −5.58% | −2.96% | −1.02% | −2.05% | −2.62% | −4.03% | −3.36% | −3.48% | −5.11% | −3.80% | −5.26% | −20.49% | −16.59% |
| Rudy | −6.33% | −3.38% | −3.00% | −2.84% | −2.12% | −3.79% | −3.94% | −2.64% | −2.41% | −4.94% | −3.90% | −14.53% | −17.79% |
| Amanda | −2.40% | −1.64% | −2.08% | −2.13% | −2.61% | −2.68% | −1.83% | −3.27% | −2.42% | −4.46% | −3.63% | −8.60% | −4.12% |
| Liz | −3.75% | −3.89% | −1.62% | −1.23% | −3.33% | −1.72% | −3.07% | −1.36% | −5.50% | −1.46% | −2.46% | −8.08% | -3.30% |
| Allen | −5.85% | −3.27% | −1.35% | −2.40% | −2.46% | −2.88% | −2.96% | −3.44% | −3.95%* | −2.06% | −3.36% | -9.13% | |
| Rebecca | −6.45% | −2.30% | −2.75% | −1.61% | −2.87% | −2.11% | −3.88% | −1.79% | −4.57% | −1.44% | -32.04% | | |
| Shay | −3.57% | −3.49% | −1.35% | −1.14% | −3.70% | −1.20% | −2.19% | −2.24% | −4.33% | -19.15% | | | |
| Daniel | −3.85% | −2.33% | −2.05% | 0.00% | −3.83% | +0.36% | −1.81% | −4.04% | −1.92% | -21.48% | | | |
| Tracey | −4.80% | −4.20% | −4.82% | −1.84% | −3.29% | −1.94% | −2.48% | −1.52% | -31.96% | | | | |
| Abby | −6.07% | −4.74% | −2.26% | −1.39% | −2.35% | −1.92% | −1.47% | -26.87% | | | | | |
| Dina | −3.16% | −3.27% | −1.27% | −2.14% | −2.62% | −2.24% | -20.18% | | | | | | |
| Coach Mo | −5.35% | −2.68% | −0.31% | −2.45% | −1.89% | -15.71% | | | | | | | |
| Julio | −3.19% | −4.82% | −1.87% | −1.09% | -37.64% | | | | | | | | |
| Antoine | −4.90% | −2.29% | −3.23% | -34.85% | | | | | | | | | |
| Sean | −4.95% | −2.61% | −1.46% | -28.64% | | | | | | | | | |
| Alexandra | −4.21% | -26.35% | | | | | | | | | | | |

* Allen had a one-pound advantage in Week 9. So his percentage of weight loss counted as 4.35%.

=== Total overall percentage of weight loss (Biggest Loser on Campus) ===
Bold denotes whom has the overall highest percentage of weight loss as of that week

| Contestant | Week | | | | | | | | | | | Semi- final |
|---|---|---|---|---|---|---|---|---|---|---|---|---|
| Danny | −5.58% | −8.37% | −9.30% | −11.16% | −13.49% | −16.98% | −19.77% | −22.56% | −26.51% | −29.30% | −33.02% | **-46.74%** |
| Rudy | −6.33% | −9.50% | −12.22% | −14.71% | −16.52% | **-19.68%** | **-22.85%** | **-24.89%** | **-26.70%** | **-30.32%** | **-33.03%** | −42.76% |
| Amanda | −2.40% | −4.00% | −6.00% | −8.00% | −10.40% | −12.80% | −14.40% | −17.20% | −19.20% | −22.80% | −25.60% | −32.00% |
| Liz | −3.75% | −7.49% | −8.99% | −10.11% | −13.11% | −14.61% | −17.23% | −18.35% | −22.85% | −23.97% | −25.84% | −31.84% |
| Allen | −5.85% | −8.92% | −10.15% | −12.31% | −14.46% | −16.92% | −19.38% | −22.15% | −25.23% | −26.77% | −29.23% | |
| Rebecca | **-6.45%** | −8.60% | −11.11% | −12.54% | −15.05% | −16.85% | −20.07% | −21.51% | −25.09% | −26.16% | | |
| Shay | −3.57% | −6.93% | −8.19% | −9.24% | −12.61% | −13.66% | −15.55% | −17.44% | −21.01% | | | |
| Daniel | −3.85% | −6.09% | −8.01% | −8.01% | −11.54% | −11.22% | −12.82% | −16.35% | −17.95% | | | |
| Tracey | −4.80% | −8.80% | **-13.20%** | **-14.80%** | **-17.60%** | −19.20% | −21.20% | −22.40% | | | | |
| Abby | −6.07% | **-10.53%** | −12.55% | −13.77% | −15.79% | −17.41% | −18.62% | | | | | |
| Dina | −3.16% | −6.32% | −7.51% | −9.49% | −11.86% | −13.83% | | | | | | |
| Coach Mo | −5.35% | −7.89% | −8.17% | −10.42% | −12.11% | | | | | | | |
| Julio | −3.19% | −7.86% | −9.58% | −10.57% | | | | | | | | |
| Antoine | −4.90% | −7.08% | −10.08% | | | | | | | | | |
| Sean | −4.95% | −7.43% | −8.78% | | | | | | | | | |
| Alexandra | −4.21% | | | | | | | | | | | |

== Elimination voting history ==
| Contestant | Week 1 | Week 2 | Week 3 | Week 4 | Week 5 | Week 6 | Week 7 | Week 8 | Week 9 | Week 10 | Week 11 | Finale |
| Eliminated | Alexandra | None* | Antoine & Sean | Julio | Coach Mo | Dina | Abby | Tracey | Daniel & Shay | Rebecca | Allen | Liz |
|---|---|---|---|---|---|---|---|---|---|---|---|---|
| Danny | Alexandra | X | ? | X | X | Daniel | Daniel | Tracey | Amanda | Rebecca | Allen | Biggest Loser |
| Rudy | Alexandra | X | ? | Liz & Danny | Coach Mo | X | X | ? | Shay | Rebecca | Liz | X |
| Amanda | Julio | X | Antoine & Sean | ? | X | Dina | Abby | Tracey | X | Liz | Allen | X |
| Liz | Alexandra | X | ? | X | Coach Mo | X | X | X | Amanda | X | X | Eliminated at Finale |
| Allen | Alexandra | X | Antoine & Sean | Julio | ? | X | X | ? | Shay | ? | X | Eliminated Week 11 |
| Rebecca | Julio | X | Antoine & Sean | ? | Coach Mo | X | X | Tracey | Shay | X | Eliminated Week 10 | |
| Shay | Julio | X | X | Julio | X | Dina | Abby | Liz | X | Eliminated Week 9 | | |
| Daniel | Julio | X | X | Julio | X | Dina | Abby | Tracey | X | Eliminated Week 9 | | |
| Tracey | X | X | Antoine & Sean | Julio | Coach Mo | X | X | X | Eliminated Week 8 | | | |
| Abby | Alexandra | X | Antoine & Sean | Julio | X | Dina | Amanda | Eliminated Week 7 | | | | |
| Dina | Alexandra | X | ? | Liz & Danny | X | Daniel | Eliminated Week 6 | | | | | |
| Coach Mo | Alexandra | X | Antoine & Sean | Julio | ? | Eliminated Week 5 | | | | | | |
| Julio | X | X | Antoine & Sean | X | Eliminated Week 4 | | | | | | | |
| Antoine | Julio | X | X | Eliminated Week 3 | | | | | | | | |
| Sean | Julio | X | X | Eliminated Week 3 | | | | | | | | |
| Alexandra | X | Eliminated Week 1 | | | | | | | | | | |

Immunity
? Immunity, vote not revealed
X No elimination due to total immunity
X Below yellow line, unable to vote
X Not in elimination, unable to vote
? Vote not revealed
Eliminated or not in house
X Below red line, automatically eliminated
Valid vote cast
X Below yellow line, America Votes
Last person eliminated before the finale (by America voting)
$250,000 winner (among the finalists)

Notes

- In week 2, the contestants completed a weight-loss challenge that allowed them to avoid elimination.
- In week 9, Daniel fell below the red line, and as a result, was automatically eliminated.

== Episode summaries ==
=== Week 1 ===
First aired September 15, 2009
Before arriving on the Biggest Loser Ranch, the contestants are given a challenge: a footrace along the last mile of the Biggest Loser Marathon from Season 7. The winner would receive immunity for themselves and the person they would choose as his or her partner. Daniel Wright is brought to the race separate from the other contestants and introduced as a surprise to them. Daniel wins the race, Allen came in 2nd, Amanda came in 3rd, Rebecca 4th, Dina and Rudy both came in 5/6th, Abby came in 7th, Antoine 8th, Liz 9th Alexandra in 10th, Júlio 11th, Danny 12th, Sean 13th, Shay came in 14th, Coach MO 15th and Tracey came in 16th even though she would have been fourth or third but she ran out of energy so she collapsed. And Tracey and Mozziz ("Coach Mo") are hospitalized following the challenge. Tracey does not return until the second week, but Coach Mo returns midway through the first. Back at the ranch, the contestants share their stories before picking teams. Daniel, winning the race, has first choice of teammates and chooses Shay as his partner, granting her immunity as well for the first week. The other contestants pick teammates in the order of finish; Tracey and Coach Mo are paired up because they were not chosen by another player.

The contestants then weigh in for the first time (with the exception of Coach Mo and Tracey). The weights are a shock to many, including trainers Jillian Michaels and Bob Harper. The initial weigh-in featured three Biggest Loser records: the greatest number of contestants having initial weights exceeding 400 pounds (five, four males and one female) and the heaviest female and heaviest contestant overall (Shay, weighing in at 476 pounds). The contestants visit several doctors, including Dr. Huizenga, who talks to them about their health, explaining their health problems in grim terms. He informs 29-year-old Sean that he has type II diabetes. The contestants then go through two workouts, with both Bob and Jillian working with all contestants, rather than dividing the gym.

At the second weigh-in, Coach Mo represents the Purple Team by himself and is the contestant with the second largest percentage of weight lost. The Black Team (Alexandra and Julio) fall below the yellow line; after the usual deliberations, the other teams choose to send Alexandra home from the ranch.

By the time this episode aired, Alexandra has lost 60 pounds. She plans to weigh 180 pounds at the finale. She also reveals that she had a crush on someone at the ranch, but will not tell who until the finale. It was revealed later (in Week 3) that she is dating fellow contestant Antoine.

=== Week 2 ===
First aired September 22, 2009

Alison offers the participants a challenge – if the group can lose a combined total of 150 pounds, then all of them can stay for at least one more week; otherwise, two of them will be eliminated. The challenge will be particularly difficult because

1. Tracey, although returning to the show, is medically limited from participating in most activities and
2. historically, the second week has been the most challenging, with contestants generally losing far less weight than in week one (and, at times, even gaining weight).

However, the group is given two challenges with rewards resulting in reductions in the weight to be lost:

- First, after a nutrition demonstration from chef Curtis Stone, the group is required to answer a series of eight questions (one per team). If the group collectively answers five questions correctly, 15 pounds will be deducted from the 150 requirement.
- Second, the group participates in a balance beam challenge. In an over-water setup similar to a baseball diamond, the group has to navigate across a series of ever-narrowing beams. The first platform (first base) gains an additional five pounds from the overall requirement; the second platform (second base) gains another five pounds; the third platform (third base) gains everyone the right to one phone call home, and the final platform (home) gains another 10 pounds.

The group successfully completes both challenges; thus, at the weigh-in the group only needs to lose 115 pounds (approximately 7.5 pounds per person).

At the weigh-in, the pink team (Amanda and Rebecca) start poorly, with only 10 pounds lost between them. However, the remaining members pick up the slack (Tracey loses 10 pounds in her first week despite her medical restrictions while Julio, the remaining black team member, loses 19 pounds, a six-pound improvement over the prior week, a surprise to Shay, who was highly critical of his passive attitude toward the workouts). The result is that the group loses 155 pounds total (five more than the original goal). Thus, no one is eliminated in Week 2.

=== Week 3 ===
First aired September 29, 2009

In a week about choices, the contestants are presented with a choice to take a two-pound advantage at the weigh-in in exchange for not working with the trainers. The first contestant to step over a line will get that exchange for his or her team. If no one takes the exchange, the amount of weight offered will go up until someone takes it. Tracey chooses to take the two-pound advantage out of a fear that one of the other contestants would jump over the line before her when the amount of weight offered was higher. Coach Mo looks shocked and reveals to the camera that he's unhappy about it.

Later, when Bob and Jillian arrive, they are angry, feeling Tracey gave up something that was worth more than just two pounds—time with the trainers is invaluable. Before setting off to train everyone else, Bob and Jillian sit Tracey down for a talk, and tell her to stop, think, and stare fear in the face without panicking.

A temptation challenge is presented to the contestants: whether to control their diets or control the game. Players are put into private booths and given small, 100-calorie cupcakes. For each team, only one player will weigh in for the entire team that week. The reward for the person who eats the most cupcakes in 10 minutes is to choose which player will represent each team at the weigh-in. Antoine eats one cupcake, causing Tracey to panic and start eating cupcakes when Ali announces that someone is winning. Tracey wins, having eaten four cupcakes. When Bob and Jillian find out, Jillian is furious and says she's done working with Tracey. She says she wants to go over there and throttle her.

For immunity, teams have to carry 500 pounds up a ramp, either by carrying two five-pound loads up at a time from a pile next to the ramp or by carrying a 25-pound load from a pile farther away. Tracey and Abby sit out due to injury, so the three contestants without teammates in the competition (Mo, Julio and Allen) each carry 250 pounds. Allen wins for the green team, but all players choose to finish their loads.

A few of the teams speak with Tracey in private to try to influence her decision of which teammate to choose to weigh in. Orange (Daniel and Shay), pink (Amanda and Rebecca), and brown all talk with her. She does not really give a clear view of what she will do, although she does agree with Daniel that "Shay has to be here." At the weigh-in, Jillian criticizes Tracey again, and chastises Mo silently accepting Tracey's decisions. As the teams weigh in, Tracey chooses the opposite of what the teams who confided in her told her they wanted. It affects the results for a couple teams, and Jillian comments to the camera that it's one of the nastiest examples of game play the show has ever seen. This puts the red and orange teams below the yellow line, with Tracey surprisingly losing 11 pounds, making her the biggest loser of the week (the Brown and Black teams would have been below the line had the "better" player from each team been chosen). Antoine and Sean appeal to the teams to send them home instead of the Orange team, saying that the Orange team (specifically Shay) needed to be on the ranch more and that the Red team has a great support system at home. The teams, though upset, respected their wishes, thus unanimously voting to send the Red team home.

By the time this episode aired, Sean has lost 120 pounds, and Antoine has lost 105 pounds. Antoine hopes to weigh less than 200 pounds by the time of the finale. This episode reveals that he is dating fellow contestant Alexandra, who was eliminated Week 1.

=== Week 4 ===
First aired October 6, 2009

On the first morning of Week 4, Bob and Jillian meet with teams and hear how Antoine and Sean "fell on the sword". Jillian tries to encourage everyone to fight for themselves. Bob admits that "Shay needs to be here," but emphasizes that they ALL need to be here!

Everyone goes to the gym to train with Bob and Jillian except for Tracey. Tracey meets with Dr. H. She's waiting to hear that she is cleared to exercise, but he tells her that her CPK levels are up from 9000 to 17000. She has to stay off her feet this week. She freaks out wondering how she's going to lose weight. Mo comes to visit her and she tells him that he is going to have to "carry the weight for the team" (again).

Ali reveals that the kitchen has been locked down. They have to order out every single meal.

Challenge: there are three choices for dinner. Whichever team chooses the healthiest option will win groceries for a year. The teams are brought in individually to see the dinners.

Dinner A: 1/4 roasted chicken breast without skin (175). 1/2 cup low fat creamed spinach (80), 2.75 oz sweet potatoes (95), 1/2 cup nonfat peach frozen yogurt (100), and 2 cups unsweetened ice tea (0). (445)

Dinner B: 1/2 rotisserie chicken with skin, 1/2 cup creamed spinach, 1/2 cup vanilla frozen yogurt, 1/2 cup blueberries, and 2 cups green tea.

Dinner C: 1/4 BBQ chicken breast with skin, 1 cup brown rice, 1 cup peas and carrots, 1 cup mango slices, and 1 cup skim milk.

Each team has two minutes to ask Ali questions before making their choice. Many of the teams go with Dinner C, others select Dinner A. No team picks Dinner B. Dinner A is the correct choice. Brown, orange, and pink got it right, but they cannot all win the groceries. They have to guess how many calories are in the meal without going over. Brown guesses 547, pink 385, and orange 475. Correct answer is 445 calories and pink wins. The teams also all get the Biggest Loser cookbook.

The teams look through menus and order food, giving instructions for how they want food prepared. It is infrequently prepared to order. Bob and Jillian visit and discover the restaurant challenge. They decide to take everyone out for dinner.

They go to a Mexican restaurant. No one brings their calorie counting book. They return the chips and salsa to the kitchen. Some people send food back to get it done right. Bob and Jillian say the best ways to cook vegetables are steaming and roasting. Avoid anything sautéed or fried and order food grilled, baked, poached, or broiled. If the kitchen cannot tell you how something is prepared, stay away.

Immunity Challenge: Each person will hold a handlebar while a platform over the water is inclined. Whoever holds on the longest wins immunity. Abby and Tracey sit out with injuries once again. Liz is the first in the water; Danny is second; brown is out. Amanda is next, followed by Rudy. Rebecca falls next and pink is out, and then Dina so blue is out. Shay is still hanging on – the last girl. Mo falls after about five minutes and purple is out, so only three teams are left. Shay falls at about ten minutes. Julio falls and is in third place, leaving Allen and Daniel. Allen looks much fitter than Daniel, and looks like he will win, but Allen says "See ya!" and falls in, so Daniel wins. Since Daniel won immunity. Daniel is also congratulated for meeting his goal and staying on longer than four weeks. Last season he was eliminated at Week 4.

Last chance workout: Bob and Jillian are "working to beat out some of the crappy food they have been eating all week." Jillian works with Rudy and he is not doing what she wants him to do. She just rips into him and he says to the camera that he's not prepared mentally today. He appears to keep working despite struggles. Next is Bob working pink team – "Pink team has to work for every single pound they get!" Liz talks to the camera and says she feels like she might have gained weight this week. Julio looks like he's doing well.

Tracey is in the house not working out. Mo says he's working twice as hard to keep them there one more week. He looks like he's working hard and Julio says he's an old warrior. After one of the rotations, it appears that Mo may have overdone it and he cramps up. The medical staff comes in. Mo says he's "done".

Bob can see the pain, and Mo looks like he's trying to walk it out. Bob says it looks like Mo is panicking and that makes your injury feel worse. Bob says he has brought 20 years of pain with him and he's struggling. He tells Mo to rest for an hour and see if that will help and if he can then get back on a bike. Triumphant music plays as Mo reenters the gym saying that he wants to stay.

Going into the weigh in, everyone is anxious because of all the restaurant food. One team will be going home this week.

The weigh in starts with orange, since they have immunity. Daniel loses 0 pounds and is accused of planning it that way. Tracey says she's expecting to gain weight, but she loses 4 – even though she was not supposed to lose anything. Shay is angry that "another healthy team is going home" while Tracey get to stay when she's not even supposed to lose weight. Julio gets 4 pounds and says he "struggled mightily to get those four pounds ... it is what it is, Alison." At 1.09%, Julio will be below the yellow line for sure. Jill thinks that his results should have been higher, and she says something is not right – that if he makes it through elimination, it will be their mission to find out what's going on. Julio and brown team are below the yellow line. Two staying is better for the people than one, but at the same time getting rid of two competitors is better for the game than only removing one.

Mo says Julio is his closest friend in the house and made a deal to not write his name down, and Tracey says she made a deal with Liz. They were at a deadlock until the last minute; she says they had to make a decision and they both cried, but they voted for Julio. Julio is eliminated. He weighed 299 pounds at the time this episode aired.

=== Week 5 ===
First aired October 13, 2009

The show starts with a temptation that resembles Wheel of Fortune meeting "Charlie and the Chocolate Factory": spin a wheel (with 36 spaces) to win the "Golden Ticket" (which allows the winner to choose teams and trainers), win $1000, or eat 1000 calories. The contestants have to choose in or out: everyone except Abby goes in, but Tracey pauses to psyche the others out. Players spin in order of total weight lost so far, starting with Rudy. He gets a 1000-calorie slice of chocolate cake and has to eat it before the next player spins. Then he goes back to the end of the line. Rebecca is next and gets a 280 cal chocolate donut. Allen then spins and gets a 100 cal cupcake. Danny gets a 780 cal cupcake. Tracey steps up and they start playing tense music – Mo says the wind started blowing and everyone felt something was coming. They were serious: she got the Golden Ticket. Everyone is shocked – gasps, groans, etc. Mo says it was "supernatural" – that she has the ability to gain control whenever she wants it.

Tracey is given time on her own to choose teams – no input from anyone else. Bob and Jillian show up to find out they are going blue vs. black, and they are a bit disgusted that Tracey is in control. She chooses Bob and says she has a "connection with Bob". Bob says "wow" and Jillian says there's no connection; she's just getting out of the ass whooping Jillian was going to give her. Daniel goes to black, Mo goes to blue, Shay goes to black. She says she "chose from the heart" and put Daniel and Shay together. Allen then goes to blue and Abby to black. Liz is starting to cry and Tracey picks her for blue. Ali asks if she's happy and she says "she needs her partner", and then Tracey puts Danny on black. Danny is pretty ticked. Rudy goes to blue (which is the color he and Dina had at the beginning of this season) and Amanda to black; Amanda starts to cry and says "Bob is more than a trainer to me." Bob says he does not want to pick favorites, but that he did have a connection with Amanda. The final picks are Rebecca for blue and Dina for black. Amanda and Rebecca start crying, and so does Tracey.

The players all basically say Tracey pissed everyone off, and it's now "World War III". Liz told Tracey it was important for her to stay with Danny, and she was "backed into a corner". Liz tells them she's going to back-stab Tracey this week – she will be so nice to her this week and cook, etc., but that she will then send her home. Workouts start next as teams and Bob says the whole situation can be really stressful. Jillian says after all the drama she just wants to deliver a good beating. Amanda begins by stopping the treadmill while working with Jillian and says she's going to puke. Then she whines about Bob and ends up puking. Jillian actually checks to make sure she was not faking. Liz says she's killing herself this week to make sure she can send Tracey home. Then Liz faints while on a treadmill. After the commercial, they show medical staff treating Liz. Bob tells her she needs to have her head on straight and she says it is – that she's going to win immunity so she can send Tracey home.

Jillian is shown working out with Dina, with the step stool. Apparently Dina has a serious mental hangup with the stool – she's afraid. Jillian tells her it's time to write a new story, but she needs to let go of the old story of not being able to do things. "Either make your butt smaller, or jump on the platform and change your life. Quit wasting time." She walks out. Rudy talks to her to try to figure out what's going on and says she needs to save herself. He tells her to stop moping around and do it. He shows her a couple times and she jumps but not on the stool. He leaves and tells her to do it for herself. They show a camera view of her trying to jump on the stool… but not really.

Bob takes his team shopping after the commercial and tutors them on how to make a quick wrap. 3 oz Jennie-O turkey breast, then free-for-all on vegetables.

Then the teams go to their first competition as blue and black. Ali: "Good players help themselves; great players help others." Each team races up a hill, splashes through mud, across a field, and to the finish. The catch is they will be carrying a platform with one player sitting the whole race. The winning team gets videos from home. Once again, Tracey and Abby sit out the challenge. They can also switch who's sitting on the platform, but someone has to be there the whole time. They start with Dina and Rebecca being carried. The path is narrow, so blue goes for the lead. Black stops because Shay is struggling while blue powers on. Blue stops for a rest before the mud and then goes through; black is not even at the mud, and then Amanda loses her shoe in the mud. After the mud, Amanda hops on the platform so she can fix her shoe; Rebecca is happy to start carrying. There's a second mud pit and black appears to be catching up but has to stop and rest several times; Shay cannot go any further so Amanda moves to the front so Shay does not have to work as hard. Daniel is struggling as well, and Shay is getting angry at him.

After the commercial, blue is shown finishing well ahead of the black team and they spin around to celebrate. Black finishes probably 60 seconds later and blue gets their videos from home. Rebecca gives her video to Dina and tells her she wants her to have a video. Dina cries and is extremely thankful. Then Rebecca tells her, "You better get on that platform!" Dina then tells her she cannot take and that she has to get on the step on her own, but she's very thankful still. The blue players are shown watching their videos. Tracey's husband says he's sleeping on a couch because it would not be fair to her for him to have a nice bed. "Pain is temporary; pride is forever! You go and win this." Liz asks Danny to come watch her video together; she wants to keep him "motivated". It turns out that Liz grabbed Danny's video instead, and he starts crying. Danny's wife says she's lost 20, her dad 26, and others as well are working at losing weight.

Last chance workout: Jillian works to help team form new bonds and trust. Bob takes his team to 24 Hour Fitness and conducts a group workout. Amanda says she feels better with Bob not visible. Tracey is walking on a treadmill and says she wants to be going faster, but that's all she can do. Mo has a hurt foot and is on a recumbent bike. Jillian says the last task for the black team's last chance workout is for them to "get Dina's ass on that platform!" She still cannot do it, but Jillian says she will get there so they go to grab a snack. Bob gives a trainer tip on doing wall push-up if normal push-ups are too much, then move to a desk and then to a full push-up when you are ready.

At the weigh in, Tracey says she feels pressure because she was the one that chose teams. One of the blue members says looking around, there's no reason why blue should lose – their team is "stacked". The person on the losing team with the highest weight loss will be immune. The weighing starts with Tracey. Tracey tells the camera everyone needs to stop acting like kindergarten kids and act like adults. She then pulls a 7-pound loss. Mo is next and he says the week was not too good, but gets 6 pounds (he was apparently injured during the week). Allen is next and gets 7, but he says his goal is 8 or 10 each week. Rudy is next and he says he's pulled double digits every week so far, but he only gets an 8 this time. Bob is annoyed by his disappointment and says 8 is a great number, especially at this point in the game. Rebecca loses 7 and says she weighed that much when she was 14. Liz wraps up the blue team weigh-in; she loses 8. That ends up making her the biggest loser on blue team, so she's immune if they lose (but it does not appear likely at this point). Blue ends up with a total loss of 2.56% and black will need to lose 46 pounds.

Abby starts and she tells the camera "we are ready"; she gets a 5. Dina is next and she says she is disappointed by the week and not getting on the platform; she loses 6. Amanda gets 6 pounds, and so far percentage-wise black is right on target to match blue team. Danny goes next; only three players remain, but two are the biggest players. Danny loses 10 pounds, and he says he's also off all his meds so he's extremely happy with double digits this week. Daniel is next, but he lost nothing last week so he may pull a big number—he gets 11, leaving 8 pounds for Shay. The tension builds… Shay says she failed the last time she had to lose 8 and they went below the yellow line. Cut to commercial, and afterwards they show her losing 16. Everyone is very excited for her on black, along with some of blue. She says taking charge, coming together, forgetting the game play, and staying in control of yourself is what matters. Bob and Jillian say goodbye, and then Rebecca says Bob asked what would happen and she suggests Tracey. Ali confirms that Liz is the highest loss and is immune; Liz is very excited to get revenge. Rudy says they knew leaving the weigh-in whom they planned to send home.

The team consults and they ask what they want to do. Tracey talks about how hard she's been working and that she has earned her spot. Rudy says that her staying may not be the best thing for the team. Mo says he feels bad that he's the lowest and that he should go—he does not want to benefit from someone else getting sent home. Rebecca tells the camera she's irritated about it, and Liz is ticked that Mo is "falling on the sword". Allen says Tracey is actually the stronger player, and he suggest they remove emotions to make the decisions. Rudy says he feels better with a coach than a Tracey. They appear split, and then they go to commercial.

Rudy tells the camera that they need to do what the best thing is for the team, even if Mo says he wants to go. Liz starts the voting; she says five weeks ago she would not have written this name down, but now they need to stay together as a team. She writes down Mo. Rudy is next and also wrote down Mo. Tracey cries and says she cannot believe she's writing down this name, but she also chose Mo. Rebecca finishes the voting off with Mo. He cries and says his goodbyes, but he appears to be looking forward to going home. After all, he asked them to send him home. He says he's excited to see his family and he will not be going back to where he was. "He's going to let everyone know it can be done at home."

Mo has now lost 76 pounds and he says that the Biggest Loser "saved his life". He talks about his group called "The Village" that he founded to help kids, and he focuses a lot more on exercise and nutrition. The final shot says Mo is working out every day with his student athletes and he hopes to lose 150 by the finale.

=== Week 6 ===
First aired October 20, 2009.

The challenge has each team looking for four keys buried in the sand, which are all needed to unlock their team's box. The prize is kept a secret. The Blue team wins, and then the prize—a week at home—is revealed. They are also offered the chance to give the reward to the opposing team, which they choose to do in order to be able to work out with the trainers while the other team must struggle off campus. The episode description and preview last week already spoiled the surprise, however, as they said one of the teams gets to go home. Because of unbalanced teams, the black team needs to sit out one other player (along with Tracey and Abby), and Amanda volunteers. Each player is assigned a pile of sand to dig through, but they soon realize that they are digging several feet into the ground to find boxes containing their key. Rudy and Allen are the first to reach their boxes, though they cannot help each other until their key is found. Once a player has found their key and removed their lock they can go help others. Danny is first to get his box out and remove his lock, and then he goes to help Daniel. Allen is next and helps Rudy who is close behind, putting blue in the lead. Danny helps Daniel finish and then each helps another teammate. Rudy and Allen help Liz, giving the blue team three keys found. Shay does not look like she's doing too well, and the blue team is getting close to finished. They get their final box out before the last two keys are found by the black team.

At home, the contestants struggle with their family responsibilities and their desire to eat healthy and work out at the gym. Shay is shown shopping for organic foods and other healthy options and Danny is keeping a food journal; Abby has a family potluck and Dina is shown jogging while her son bikes. Amanda hangs out with friends, and Daniel says they are at a real disadvantage. Danny goes to a gym to work out with his wife and says it's going to be a big distraction, but it's the only way he can spend more time with her. Abby is swimming and she's still struggling with her stress fracture; it's a 30-minute drive to a pool for her, but she makes it a priority. Daniel says that it's sort of expected for him to do well, since he's been home before. At home, Dina has difficulty with her son, since she now has to help out while her husband works. Amanda is shown at the gym and she looks lost and says that she does not know how to use the equipment. Shay feels uncomfortable at a gym with all the fit people looking at her like she does not belong. This footage is juxtaposed with footage of Bob working the Blue team really hard, with the Blue team responding enthusiastically to the training.

Bob takes the blue team to The Food Bank at their request as they were "inspired by the challenge last season." The director of the food bank states how many people in the United States are at risk for hunger (1 in 8). The Black team returns to the ranch and the last chance workout takes place. Jillian focuses particularly on Daniel, saying that he's been through two seasons and that he's just not showing the intensity as though there's something he's not telling her. Daniel cries during the workout and talks about how his mom was always trying to stop him from gaining weight, but he always saw it as her not loving him for who he was. Jill says that Daniel had an epiphany about his family dynamic and how it contributed to his weight.

The weigh-in begins. The Blue Team goes first and most of the team are disappointed in their losses. Rudy, however, is not, having lost 14 pounds, for a grand total of 87 pounds in 6 weeks. Ali says that if Rudy can lose 13 pounds at the next weigh-in, he will have lost 100 pounds faster than any other contestant in U.S. Biggest Loser history.

The Blue Team loses a total of 35 pounds, or 2.65% weight lost. The black team will need to have lost more than 45 pounds, a bit more than 7 pounds each, to beat them.

The Black team is disappointed with their losses, except for Danny, who loses 15 pounds. The team learns they have lost when Daniel is weighed and has gained a pound. He says being home was emotionally difficult, and assures his teammates that he did not go home and slack off. Daniel feels like the one pound gain puts a target on his back. The black team ends up with 1.98% of weight loss and goes to the elimination room. Danny is immune from elimination as the biggest loser of the week.

The votes are split between Daniel and Dina, with Dina losing by one vote.

The crew visits Dina now. She says the person she was when she came to the ranch had zero confidence but she's beginning to see her potential. "I'm gonna win this battle. I'm going to look in the mirror one day and see the Dina that's been hiding." They show her update and she weighs 188 pounds, having lost 65 pounds. She has now made working out more of a family affair. She goes to get a makeover in an effort to help let go of her past. She comes out with new clothes and a different hairdo to the cheers of her family. It is revealed that she recently completed her first half marathon and hopes to complete a full marathon.

=== Week 7 ===
First aired October 27, 2009

Bob takes his blue team to the pool, while Jillian works in the gym with her black team. Jillian says she's trying to push them out of their comfort zone so it's uncomfortable and she can help them learn to deal with difficult situations. Amanda says she cannot deal with the pressure anymore and has a breakdown, and ends up leaving the gym.

The players have a challenge at a baseball stadium. To help explain the challenge, Derek Jeter (who owns several New York-area 24 Hour Fitness franchises) is on the big stadium TV. He encourages several of the players by name, and tells the black team to step it up. The winning team gets Curtis Stone to cook lunch for the entire team, plus a 2-pound advantage at the weigh-in. They can split it up 1 pound to two players, or 2 pounds to one person. Abby is out for medical reasons, and Tracey sits out for Blue.

Jillian talks to Abby and she says how she's learning to live and love again. Losing everything she loved was her worst nightmare. She talks about what exactly happened. She was not feeling well and went to the emergency room to get checked out. She kissed her daughter one last time and that was the last she saw her. They were killed about 5 miles from her home by a guy going over 100 mph. She was supposed to have been with them and is apparently feeling some guilt. "I'm going to live and not just exist anymore." Jillian is touched and says she is not sure she could have handled what happened to Abby. Abby says going home last week and playing with her niece was the first time in a long time where she was living with her family again and not just being present.

Amanda talks to Jillian about walking out of the gym. She has difficulty being in a leader role and not just being the fat girl in the back. Jillian says she needs to redefine failure; it's not failing, it's a learning process. Bob does last chance workout, starting with Allen. He's doing jumps to stools, and gets up to a 3-foot platform. After a bit of psyching himself up, he does it. Bob works Amanda and Rebecca, who are facing off, together on exercise bikes. Jillian talks with Shay about how it was being the daughter of a heroin user. Then Shay admits, "I could not make her love me!" Jillian tells her she needs to forgive herself and stop blaming herself for not saving her mom.

The weigh-in starts. The two pound advantage is given to Amanda. Rudy loses 14 pounds at the weigh-in, breaking the record for fastest loss of 100 pounds—seven weeks. Daniel and Abby fall below the yellow line. Abby basically volunteers to be voted off, saying she has completed what she set out to do. Abby tells the camera, "The next chapter of my life is yet to be seen… I'm ready to fly again." Abby started at 247 and leaves the ranch at 201 pounds. "When I came, I was at the lowest point in my life; I was broken and I knew something had to change." At her homecoming, there's a big party in her home town for her, with over a hundred people chanting "Abby, Abby!" She lost her family 2.5 years ago, "and I'm sure you felt at times that you lost me too. But I'm back!" At her revisit, Abby has lost a total of 80 pounds since starting – making her weight as of this airing 167 pounds, with a loss of 34 pounds since going home.

Prior to the disclaimer credit, the episode is dedicated in the memory of her deceased husband (Rick) and children (Macy and Caleb).

=== Week 8 ===
First aired November 3, 2009

The mission for the next week is for them to do everything they can to help Americans live healthier, happier lives. To do this, they are going to spend the episode in Washington DC.

Bob and Jillian are going to do a public workout at the Washington Memorial, and contestants must bring members of the public to join them. Whoever brings the most people, wins. The winning team also gets a free meal at Subway. Tracey starts stealing people from other teams! Amanda loses her whole group when they find out Daniel is on the show again this season. Allen gets firemen to help him and they show up at the workout. Ultimately, Liz wins over Allen by one person. The next day the contestants go meet and talk with two Senators (Kirsten Gillibrand and Bob Casey, Jr., both of whom serve on the Subcommittee on Hunger, Nutrition and Family Farms) about the issue of obesity among youth and children. They tell their stories about how they got to where they are and what might help.

At the week's challenge, contestants have four tasks: run one mile (two laps) around Constitution Gardens Lake; move 17954 pennies each from the bottom to the top of the steps of the Lincoln Memorial— one penny for each pound lost on the Biggest Loser; balance on a platform on a narrow 2" brick while holding a Pilates ball, in front of the Capitol; and then, take 206 steps on a step platform, one for each Biggest Loser contestant since season one. Rebecca wins.

The contestants then get a tour of the White House. They meet the White House chef for the tour, and they are shown Michelle Obama's garden where she grows vegetables to eat in the White House. The contestants help to pick and prepare vegetables, then eat them at lunch.

The weigh-in is held at the steps of the Lincoln Memorial. Liz and Tracey fall below the yellow line and Tracey is voted off. Tracey tells the camera that it has been an amazing experience and she's come so far from the start. She "did what I had to do to stay here; I played the game and no one likes that." "I may have struggled to run a mile this week, but the next time you see me I'll look like I've run a thousand miles!" She says that was the old Tracey who is dead and buried, and this is the new Tracey. Her husband and kids cry when she gets home, and they hug her. They show her at the several month update, running a mile on the beach same beach where she collapsed. She runs the mile without difficulty in 11:22.18. She has lost 41 pounds since going home (85 pounds total).

=== Week 9 ===
First aired November 10, 2009

Ali reveals to the contestants that two people will be going home, but there's a second twist. In addition to the yellow line, there will also be a red line. Whoever falls below the red line will be automatically eliminated and sent home prior to the voting. After that, the remaining two lowest will be up for elimination. After this revelation, there's a pop challenge for a 1-pound advantage. Each player has 50 tennis balls on a wall, and they need to jump up, grab one, run to their bucket and drop it in. Liz and Amanda sit out the challenge because of injury. Allen wins.

Rebecca and Amanda say that the best option would be for Liz to be below the red line. They feel the older and younger generations have separated. Danny and Liz reiterate that there appears to be a generational split. This week, everyone appears to be working extra hard due to fear of the red line. The older group is shown discussing possibilities. Their "best-case" is for all of them to stay above both lines.

After the break, a challenge takes place at the Ringling Brothers-Barnum and Bailey circus. The contestants will jump through hoops. Each time a person goes through another contestant's hoop, that player gets a point, and you are out at 100. Alison reveals that they are playing for immunity. Rudy and Shay appear to have an alliance at the start. All of the young alliance start by targeting Liz; they want "someone that could fall below the line" to not have immunity. Liz is the first to be eliminated from the challenge. Amanda is next, followed by Daniel and Allen. Rudy has 0, while Rebecca, Danny, Rudy, and Shay are getting points. Rebecca is next out, and Rudy then starts going through Shay's hoop, which upsets Shay because she thought she and Rudy had a good relationship. The two fight, and Rudy puts Shay out. Rudy wins immunity. Daniel and Rebecca move spin bikes into Shay's room so that the young members can exercise while the other team thinks they are sleeping or resting.

At the weigh-in, Shay loses 17 pounds, making her the fastest woman to lose 100 pounds. However, she and Amanda end up below the yellow line, and Daniel ends up below the red line, so he must leave the show. Shay is voted off.

Daniel and Shay have their homecomings with many friends and family there. Everyone at Shay's house is happy to hear of her success. She says the highest weight loss on TBL ever is 212 pounds, so she wants to lose at least 213 pounds by December. Daniel has lost 198 pounds total so far and still hopes to fulfill his goal of losing the most total weight of any contestant. He says, "winning the show was not the goal; making the decision to change was winning." At the check in, Daniel is down to 239 pounds. He visits David, his friend from last season, who has gained back most of the weight he lost on the previous season and does not plan to change. Daniel also has a girlfriend that he hopes to introduce to America at the finale (it is revealed later that it is fellow contestant Rebecca).

=== Week 10 ===
First aired November 17, 2009
90 minute episode

This week is makeover week, and each contestant is made over with the assistance of Tim Gunn and Tabatha Coffey. They then give speeches designed to inspire and motivate others.

The challenge this week is a repeat from a previous season: they have wires crossing a chasm with pictures of their "old selves" on the other side. The contestants will need to cross on the wire using a pulley to cross the 700 feet at a height of 200 feet. The winner of the challenge wins a two-week trip to the new Biggest Loser resort in St. George, Utah. Liz is afraid of heights but manages to complete the challenge, and Rudy wins the challenge.

After the challenge, they have the last chance workout. Bob hold Allen back to find out why he is not winning challenges. Allen admits he's playing the game—letting others win in order to make himself less of a threat. Jillian learns that Rudy's weight gain began with the death of his older sister when he was a teen and she talks with him about it.

At the weigh-in, Liz and Rebecca fall below the yellow line. Rebecca loses after Rudy voted against her. Rebecca and Rudy had a heated angry exchange as he said he "does not trust her", and she asserted her trustworthiness. After Rebecca goes home, she runs a half marathon, crying as she does it because she is so happy to have become the person she wanted to be. She has lost 107 pounds.

=== Week 11 ===
First aired November 24, 2009

Investment guru Suze Orman makes a guest appearance on the show to advise the contestants and to administer a quiz. She says she is there to help them find the balance between health and wealth. She tells them that obesity is a very expensive disease. She asks them financial questions relating to health and weight.

Jillian has a talk with the contestants about going home and eating right while they sit around the kitchen table. Later at the gym, Bob talks to them about keeping the weight off and wants to know what is scary for them, so they can work on it before they go home. The contestants are made to perform the same exercises they did when they first arrived, so they can see how far they have come.

The Challenge involves the contestants having to carry the weight they have lost each week in the form of footballs. They will run across a football field, and each trip down the field, they will drop off one football representing that week. The winner will win a vacation package for two to the 2010 NFL Pro Bowl. Alison then introduces cornerback Rod Woodson, wearing his Steelers jersey. Woodson tells them that the NFL will also donate $5000 in athletic equipment to the school of the winner's choice. Allen wins. Back at the house, Danny plays and sings a song he wrote about their time at the Biggest Loser Ranch.

At the weigh-in, Rudy breaks the record for the most weight lost in 11 weeks. Danny breaks the record for most losing double digits for the most weeks in a row (a record that previously belonged to Jeff Levine from season 2). The winner (Danny) wins a Chef Curtis Stone visit to their home to show them how to cook right. Allen and Liz fall below the yellow line, and Allen is voted off. Allen arrives home to a cheering crowd at City of Columbus Fire Station Number 2. He now weighs 220 pounds.

=== Week 12 (semi-final) ===
First aired December 1, 2009

The contestants all go home for 60 days, in which they have to find time to balance time with their families, their jobs, and find time to work out. They each get sent a video from Bob and Jillian, saying how far they have come and showing them during Week 1, and how they are no longer that person. Amanda also get Extra gum in her package. After they watch the videos, they each get a phone call from either Bob or Jillian, explaining that they were going to run a marathon. They all look forward to the challenge, but are scared. Later they each get visits from either Bob or Jillian, checking in on them: Jillian focuses on helping Danny and his wife work together, Bob encourages Amanda to put all her effort into working out, Jillian works with Liz on focusing on herself before others for once, seeing she is isolated and a gym is nowhere near, and her husband is often out of town, while Bob helps Rudy balance his family, his job, and working out. They all come back to run the marathon, and at the halfway point each one is accompanied by a companion: Rudy gets Dina, Amanda gets her best friend, Liz gets her husband, and Danny gets his wife. Rudy finishes first, then Amanda, and then Danny and Liz finish together. At the weigh-in, Liz and Amanda fall below the yellow line, and they are put to America's vote to see who will go on to the finale.

=== Week 13 (finale) ===
First aired December 8, 2009

In the first five minutes of the finale, it is revealed that Amanda has been chosen to be a member of the final three, and Liz is eliminated. Sean reveals that his wife has given birth to a baby girl, who they have named Jillian. Antoine proposes to Alexandra during the finale, and she says yes. Rebecca Meyer wins the $100,000 prize for the greatest percentage of weight loss among the eliminated contestants. Among the final three, Amanda weighs in at 163, with a weight loss of 87 pounds and a percentage of 34.80%. After Amanda, Rudy weighs in at 208 pounds, with a weight loss of 234 pounds, meaning he has broken Erik Chopin's record of greatest amount of weight lost, by 20 pounds, with a total percentage of weight loss of 52.94%. Then, Danny weighs in at 191 pounds, meaning a loss of 239 pounds. Thus the new record-breaking weight loss of 55.58% means that Danny Cahill wins the $250,000 prize, and is the eighth season's Biggest Loser.

Bob and Subway (a Biggest Loser sponsor) offered Shay a chance to be weighed again at the finale of the upcoming Season 9, "Couples 3" – Shay will be awarded $1,000 for every pound that she loses below her final weight of 304 pounds. She lost 52 pounds, which made her be awarded $52,000. She currently (November 2010) weighs 252 pounds.

One item of note is that at the final weigh-in, Tracey's starting weight is listed as 250 pounds; however, due to illness, she missed the first weigh-in and that weight was not announced at that time. She was listed as being 238 at the second weigh-in, Which means she lost 12 pounds the first time her weight was announced on the show. The difference in weight does not affect her overall ranking, though.

== US ratings ==
| Episode | Rating | Share | Rating/share (18–49) | Viewers (millions) | Rank (timeslot) | Rank (night) |
|---|---|---|---|---|---|---|
| 1 | 6.2 | 10 | | | 1 | 1 |
| 2 | 4.8 | 7 | 3.1/8 | 7.56 | 4 | 5 |
| 3 | 5.7 | 9 | | | 2 | 3 |
| 4 | 5.6 | 9 | 3.7/10 | 9.25 | 2 | 3 |
| 5 | 5.5 | 9 | | | 2 | 3 |
| 6 | 5.8 | 9 | 3.9/11 | 9.82 | 1 | 2 |
| 7 | 5.8 | 9 | 3.7/10 | 9.67 | 1 | 1 |
| 8 | 5.6 | 9 | 3.5/9 | 9.11 | 3 | 4 |
| 9 | 5.8 | 9 | 3.8/10 | 9.65 | 3 | 3 |
| 10 | 5.5 | 9 | 3.7/10 | 9.56 | 1 | 2 |
| 11 | N/A | N/A | 2.8/8 | 7.70 | 1 | 1 |
| 12 | 6.3 | 10 | 3.7/10 | 9.99 | 1 | 1 |
| 13 | 8.1 | 13 | 5.0/13 | 13.45 | 1 | 1 |
