= Transfer board =

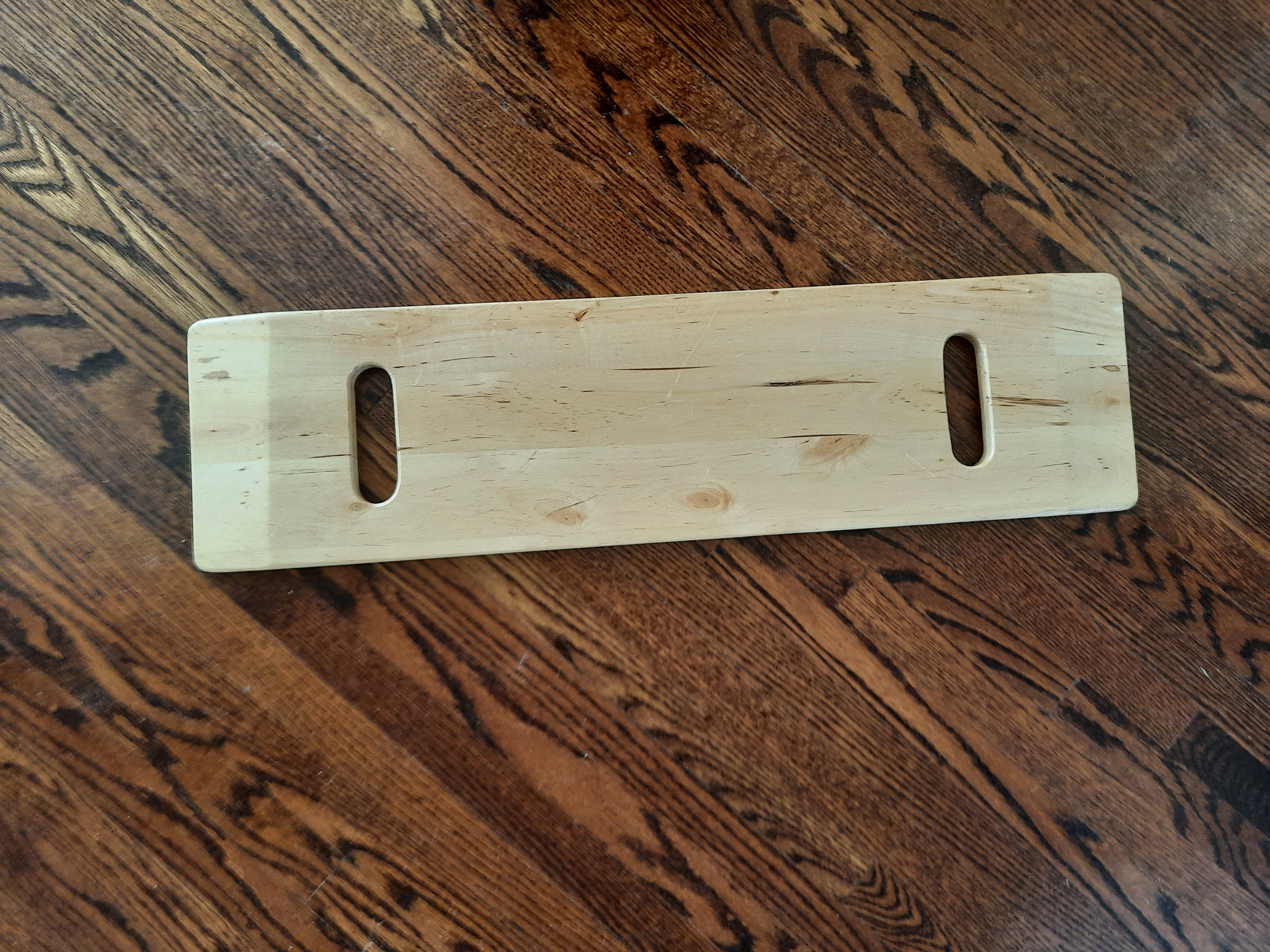
A transfer board

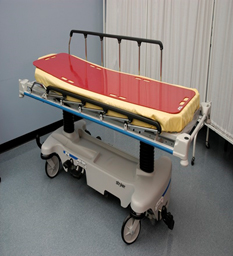
Transfer board (red) on a stretcher

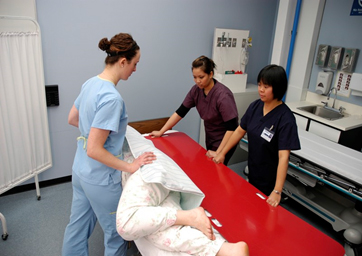
Placing a transfer board (red) under a patient

A transfer board, sliding board or slider board is a device designed for helping those with a physical disability to move from one surface (like a bed) to another (like a wheelchair). For safe use of a transfer board, the person who is being transferred should be able to participate in the move by sliding over the transfer board, there should be some cushioning in the buttock area for safe transfer.
