= List of health club chains =

This is a list of gym chains by country. Some gyms may have the same name but in fact be unrelated. This is a list of generally corporate-owned or franchised gyms operating worldwide.

== Africa ==
=== Egypt ===
- Gold's Gym
- Snap Fitness

=== South Africa ===
- Virgin Active

=== Namibia ===
- Virgin Active

== Americas ==
=== Canada ===
- 24 Hour Fitness
- Anytime Fitness
- Crunch Fitness
- Equinox Fitness
- Gold's Gym
- GoodLife Fitness
- LA Fitness
- Orangetheory Fitness
- Planet Fitness
- Snap Fitness
- World Gym

=== Chile ===
- Hard Candy Fitness - Santiago

=== Costa Rica ===
- Gold's Gym

=== Dominican Republic ===
- Gold's Gym
- Planet Fitness

=== Ecuador ===
- Gold's Gym

=== Mexico ===
- Gold's Gym
- Hard Candy Fitness - Mexico City
- Snap Fitness
- World Gym - Querétaro
- Planet Fitness

=== Peru ===
- Gold's Gym

=== United States ===
- 24 Hour Fitness
- Anytime Fitness
- Crunch Fitness
- Curves International
- Equinox Fitness
- F45 Training
- Gold's Gym
- John Reed Fitness
- LA Fitness
- Lifetime Fitness
- Orangetheory Fitness
- Planet Fitness
- Blink Fitness
- Snap Fitness
- Town Sports International
- Youfit

== Asia ==
=== Hong Kong ===
- Anytime Fitness
- Fitness First

=== India ===
- Anytime Fitness
- Fitness First
- Gold's Gym
- Snap Fitness
- Celebrity Fitness
- Talwalkars

=== Indonesia ===
- Celebrity Fitness
- Fitness First
- Gold's Gym
- Anytime Fitness

=== Japan ===
- Anytime Fitness
- Gold's Gym
- Gunze Sports (ja)

=== Kuwait ===
- Gold's Gym

=== Malaysia ===
- Anytime Fitness
- Celebrity Fitness
- Fitness First

=== Philippines ===
- Anytime Fitness
- Fitness First
- Gold's Gym
- Snap Fitness

=== Saudi Arabia ===
- GymNation
- Fitness First
- Gold's Gym

=== Singapore ===
- Anytime Fitness
- Celebrity Fitness

=== Taiwan ===
- World Gym

=== Thailand ===
- Anytime Fitness
- Fitness First
- Jetts Fitness - Bangkok
- Virgin Active

=== Turkey ===
- John Reed Fitness

=== United Arab Emirates ===
- GymNation
- Fitness First
- Gold's Gym

== Europe ==
=== Austria ===
- John Reed Fitness
- McFit

=== Czech Republic ===
- John Reed Fitness

=== France ===
- John Reed Fitness

=== Germany ===
- Fitness First
- Gold's Gym
- John Reed Fitness
- Hard Candy Fitness
- McFit

=== Hungary ===
- John Reed Fitness

=== Ireland ===
- Anytime Fitness
- Ben Dunne Gyms
- West Wood Club

=== Italy ===
- Hard Candy Fitness - Rome and Milan
- Gold's Gym
- John Reed Fitness
- McFit

=== Netherlands ===
- Gold's Gym
- John Reed Fitness
- Jetts Fitness

=== Poland ===
- McFit

=== Russia ===
- Gold's Gym
- Hard Candy Fitness - Moscow and St Petersburg
- World Gym

=== Spain ===
- Gold's Gym
- McFit

=== Nordic countries ===
- Elixia

=== United Kingdom ===
- Anytime Fitness
- Bannatyne
- Ben Dunne Gyms
- David Lloyd Leisure
- Energie Group Gyms
- Everlast Gyms
- F45 Training
- Fitness First
- Gold's Gym
- The Gym Group
- Gymbox
- JD Sports Gyms
- Jetts Fitness
- John Reed Fitness
- Nuffield Health
- Places for People
- PureGym
- Snap Fitness
- Sports Direct Fitness
- Total Fitness
- Village Hotel Club
- Virgin Active

== Oceania ==
=== Australia ===
- Anytime Fitness
- Crunch Fitness
- EFM Health Clubs
- F45 Training
- Fitness First
- Gold's Gym
- Goodlife Health Clubs
- Hard Candy Fitness
- Hypoxi
- Jetts Fitness
- Les Mills International
- Snap Fitness
- Virgin Active
- World Gym

=== New Zealand ===
- Anytime Fitness
- F45 Training
- Jetts Fitness
- Les Mills International
- Snap Fitness

== Defunct chains ==
- Bally Total Fitness
- California Fitness
- Esporta Health Clubs

== See also ==
- YMCA
