= California Fitness =

Gym franchise based in East Asia

JV Fitness
- Trade name: California Fitness
- Type: Private
- Industry: Fitness
- Founded: 1996; 30 years ago, Hong Kong

California Fitness was a fitness company based in Hong Kong. It opened its first club in 1996 at the business district of Hong Kong near Lan Kwai Fong. There were 16 clubs in Hong Kong, Singapore and China. California Fitness was acquired in 1999 by 24 Hour Fitness Worldwide, which sold it to the Ansa Group in 2012.

California Fitness was the trading name of JV Fitness; it was the second largest gym operator in Hong Kong with nine locations.

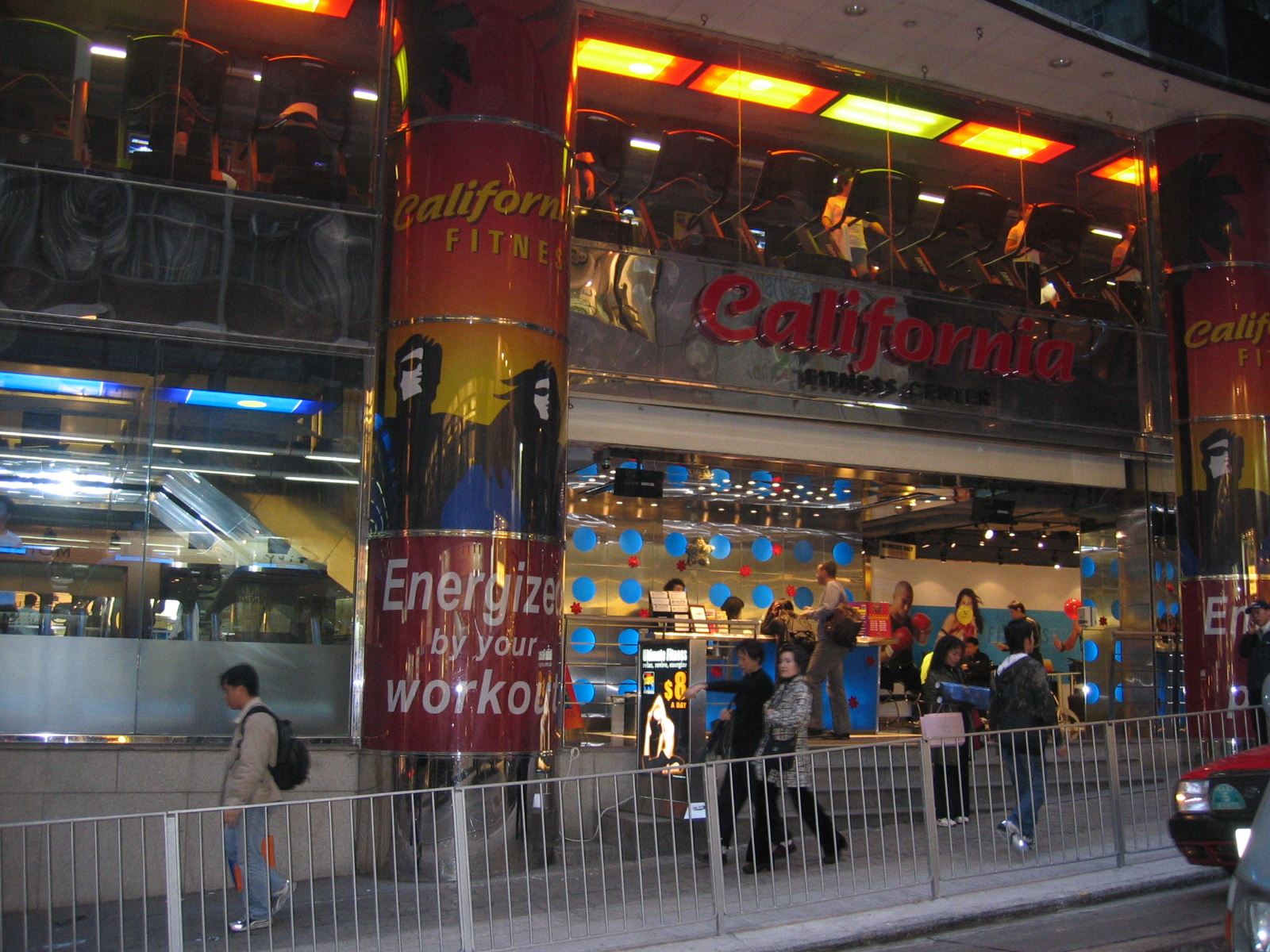
The first California Fitness club opened in 1996 in Wellington Street, Hong Kong (relocated to Queen's Road Central in 2011). Former club entrance in 2005.

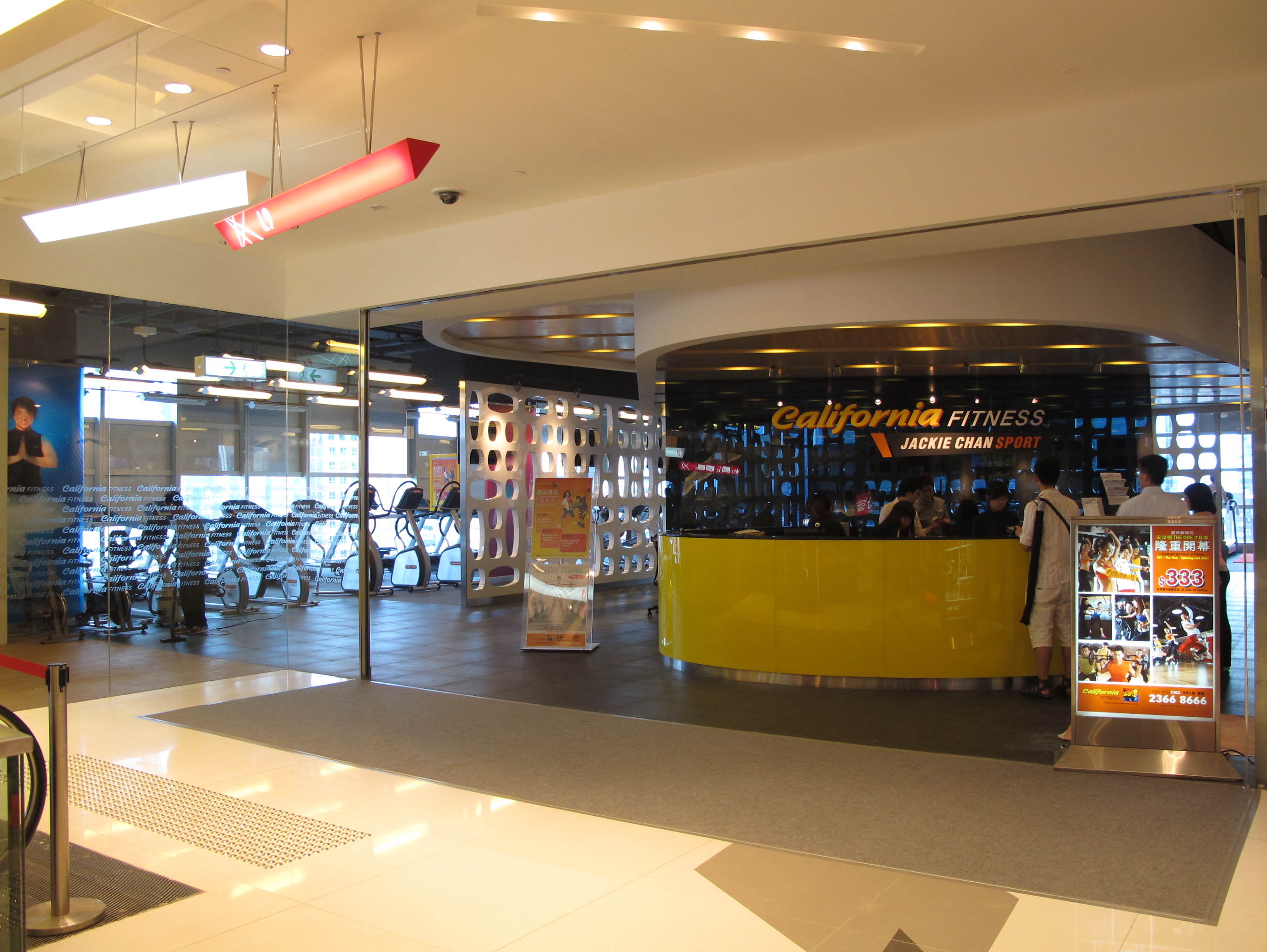
California Fitness Tsim Sha Tsui club

== Clubs ==
- Mainland China (3)

Beijing (The Place), Shanghai (Infiniti Plaza), Guangzhou (Seasons Mall)

- Hong Kong (9)

Central, Causeway Bay, Wan Chai, Tsim Sha Tsui, Mongkok, Whampoa, Tuen Mun, Quarry Bay, Megabox, Leap by California Fitness: One Kowloon

- Singapore (4)

Bugis, Novena Square, Orchard, Raffles

Beginning in 2005, California Fitness partnered with two fitness superstars, Jackie Chan and Yao Ming, to create signature clubs in the region. There were two California Fitness-Yao Ming Sport clubs in mainland China which were re-branded as normal California Fitness in 2010. Also were four California Fitness-Jackie Chan Sport clubs in Asia (two in Hong Kong and two in Singapore) re-branded as normal California Fitness in 2012. California has chosen Richie Jen as new spokesman since 2012. California Fitness is infamous for having the most number of complaints lodged against them to the Consumers' Association of Singapore (CASE).

- The Thai and Korean chains were spun off into California WOW Xperience in the early 2000s.
- Three former Malaysian clubs were acquired by Celebrity Fitness in 2009.
- Six former Taiwan clubs were acquired by World Gym in September 2010.

== Products, services and facilities ==
The company's business model is based on an entry fee and contracts of variable duration that are tacitly renewed unless one month's notice in writing is given. In addition to cardio and resistance equipment, free weights, group exercise studios, all California Fitness clubs have free internet access (wifi or in-club kiosks). Most of its clubs have steam and sauna rooms and there is an outdoor swimming pool at Megabox Club Kowloon Bay, one of its Hong Kong clubs.

== Controversies ==
=== Credit control policies ===
The company took legal action against 522 of its members between 30 March and 15 September 1999 for non-payment of subscriptions. Many of these were in fact members who did not want to renew and had allowed their membership to lapse, or who had not given the required 1-month's notice stipulated in the contract. The judge at the Small Claims Court criticised the company for allowing the credit to roll on for at least one month before taking action. The company argued that its policy was to avoid unilateral termination by them as it would cause members to pay a rejoining fee.

=== Monitor complaints in Singapore ===
California Fitness clubs in Singapore were hit by a significant number of consumer complaints filed against them with the Consumers Association of Singapore (CASE) between 2011 and 2014. Gripes against California Fitness and a rival True Fitness made up more than three-quarters of 86 complaints involving fitness clubs filed last year with the former receiving 35 complaints against it in 2013. As of April 2014 nine complaints were filed against California Fitness with CASE.

=== California WOW Xperience ===
California Fitness centers (CalFit) in Thailand began operating in 2002, were sold (or rebranded) as California WOW Xperience (SET: CAWOW) in 2005 (CalWow), a totally separate company yet started by people with connections to 24 Hour Fitness founders like Mark Mastrov, with the California Fitness founder Eric Levine as the CEO, bringing in outside investors such as Bank of Ayutthaya. In Thailand this allowed it fund a domestic expansion from 2 to over 13 locations as well as then expanded to many countries, including Korea, outside Thailand as franchise locations. The franchises didn't last more than 2 years in Korea, these franchisees abruptly closed doors on members in Korea by 2006, who had been sold expensive lifetime memberships. The cross-membership agreements between California Fitness and 24 Hour Fitness were rolled into California WOW Xperience, however once financials became worrisome in August 2008, cross-memberships were terminated between CalWow and 24 Hour Fitness (USA), but remained between Asian chains CalWow and CalFit and between CalFit and 24 Hour Fitness. In August 2008, California Fitness and 24 Hour Fitness were terminated. In 2009, Malaysian branches of CalFit were sold to Celebrity Fitness, whose founders also had ties to 24 Hour Fitness. Despite company changes, California WOW Xperience is still frequently confused with California Fitness.

In 2012, California WOW Xperience found itself entangled in a financial dispute and was sued in Thailand's Bankruptcy Court by Bangkok Bank Plc. which sought the repayment of a 72 million baht loan including 4 million baht in interest. As a result, California WOW Xperience shut down seven of its eight branches in Thailand. The company faced much criticism for continuing to sign up customers at the various branches until their date of closing. In August 2012, more than 200 members, many of whom found themselves unable to travel to California WOW Xperience's single remaining Thailand branch to make use of long term or lifetime memberships, filed complaints against the company in hopes of being refunded. The Foundation for Consumers along with 100 former customers have filed a lawsuit against California WOW Xperience which is now awaiting a court order. Incidentally, this was also the very same month 24 Hour Fitness was sold in USA. At roughly the same time, CalFit Taiwan gyms abruptly closed on customers, some who had been sold lifetime memberships, and these became World Gym centers. Membership was honored at the new gym over for a few months and then terminated.

In 2016, CalFit itself abruptly closed doors on members in Hong Kong and Singapore, some who had been sold lifetime memberships.

=== Watchdog complaints in Hong Kong ===
In April 2016, Consumer Council censured California Fitness for intimidation and misleading sales practices. The council said complaints regarding California Fitness had increased continuously in the previous few years, from 227 cases in 2013 to 296 cases in 2015, despite the council having already given several warnings. In 2015, California Fitness represented more than half of the complaints regarding fitness centres, and the value involved reached to 8.5 million Hong Kong dollars. The council had met with company management in January, and made its censure public after the situation failed to improve. In most of the cases, The sales use "free trial" or "free gift" as excused to attract new customers to enter their centre and collect identity card and credit card from the customers, then convince, mislead and force them to sign the contracts and pay for membership, as well as training courses. Some of the sales even force the customers to take a picture with smiling face to prove the contracts are based on their own willing. Some of the cases involve persons with intellectual disability.

Two members of staff were arrested by customs officers on 18 May after a customer claimed she had been coerced into paying for private training classes after her credit card was charged HK$140,000 without her consent. The two staff at the Causeway Bay branch of the gym operator chain were accused of violating the unfair trade practice provision under the Trade Descriptions Ordinance.

== Financial difficulties ==
JV Fitness, the company that operates the chain, were reported in July 2016 to be owing some HK$130 million for rents and other operating costs in Hong Kong. A number of landlords and building contractors had filed writs with the High Court for debts owed to them. A petition to wind up the company was lodged with the court in early July 2016, and creditors including prepaid members and staff have been coming forward. Five of its outlets had shut as of 7 July; one branch in Beijing was closed from 8 July for "internal reorganisation". All outlets owned and operated by JV Fitness, the holding company, were officially closed on 12 July, and two senior executives were being interrogated by the Customs and Excise on suspicion of violating trade description law. On 20 July it was announced that all its gyms in Singapore would also close.
