= Toback =

Toback is a surname. Notable people with the surname include:

- James Toback (born 1944), American screenwriter and film director
- Paul Toback, American lawyer
