= Jim Rowley =

American businessman

- Occupation: Executive Chairman of Crunch Fitness
- Military career
- Allegiance: United States
- Branch: United States Marine Corps

Jim Rowley is an American businessman. He is currently the Executive Chairman of Crunch Fitness. Rowley is a veteran of the United States Marine Corps.

== Early life ==
In 1986, Rowley enlisted in the United States Marine Corps. Rowley served until 1994, including OCONUS assignments with the State Department and Marine Corps Embassy Security Group, and a combat tour during the Persian Gulf War as a platoon sergeant.

== Career ==
After finishing his service in the Marine Corps, Jim landed an entry-level position in the fitness industry. Rowley then spent years working his way up to Division President at 24 Hour Fitness. In this capacity, he oversaw 225 clubs, managed $750 million in revenue, and led nearly 8,000 employees. In 2005, 24 Hour Fitness was sold for $1.68 billion. In 2008, Rowley co-founded UFC gym.

In 2008, Mark Mastrov (Founder of 24 Hr Fitness) and Rowley co-founded New Evolution Fitness Co. ("NEFC"/New Evolution Ventures). That same year, investor Angelo Gordon brought them in to evaluate Crunch’s failing business model. Mastrov and Rowley then purchased Crunch Fitness after its 2009 bankruptcy. In 2010, they chose to franchise Crunch, accelerating its location growth and branding. In 2019, TPG Growth acquired Crunch. Crunch experienced a 5.6% growth in memberships from March 2020 to January 2021 across the company’s franchise network.

Rowley served as Chairman of Crunch from 2009 to 2019. Since 2019, Rowley has served as CEO of Crunch, revamping the marketing, sales, and operational processes. Focus was placed on carving out a niche in the premium segment of high-value, low-price health clubs. This model offered facilities with a variety of amenities at reasonable prices.

During his time as CEO, Crunch’s member base grew to 3 million and nearly 500 locations. During the COVID-19 pandemic, Crunch took the time to re-examine the business and improve existing facilities. When they were able to re-open, the business grew by 5%.

In 2023, the company launched Crunch+, a streaming platform offering on-demand and live workouts. By August 2024, the company reported double-digit sales growth. In December of the same year, Crunch was valued at $1.5 billion. In April 2025, Leonard Green & Partners acquired a majority interest in Crunch from TPG Growth. Crunch plans to add over 90 gyms in 2025 and remodel 25 to 50 gyms in this deal. Also in 2025, Crunch Fitness signed a master franchise agreement to open at least 75 gyms in India over the coming years. Crunch secured the #1 fitness franchise spot for Entrepreneur’s Franchise 500 ranking in 2025.

In June 2026, Rowley was named an EY US Entrepreneur of the Year for the New York region. In July 2026, he announced his transition to Executive Chairman of Crunch Fitness. In August 2026, Rowley authored Perspire to Greatness, a book on leadership, discipline, and professional development.

== Personal life ==
Rowley was born into a military family as a sixth-generation Californian, which influenced his decision to serve in the Marine Corps. He played sports as a youth. Rowley has an identical twin.
