= Marq*E Entertainment Center =

Entertainment center in Houston, Texas

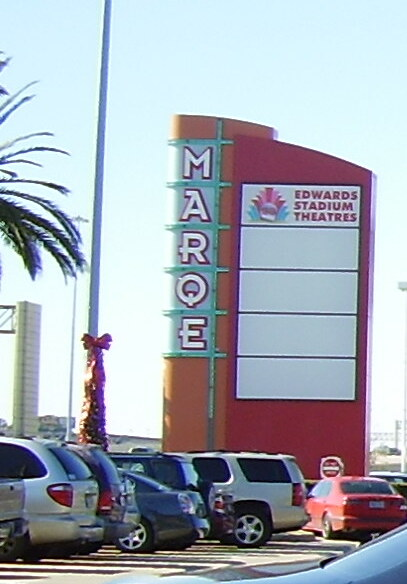
- Sign for the center
- Interactive map of Marq*E Entertainment Center
- Address: House, Texas; United States
- Coordinates: 29°47′10″N 95°27′54″W

The Marq*E Entertainment Center is an open-air, 35-acre entertainment center in Houston, in the U.S. state of Texas. The center has a Regal theater with an IMAX theatre.

== Tenants ==
The 360,000-square-foot center houses a large selection of businesses such as restaurants and entertainment.

Restaurants

- Aviator Pizza & Drafthouse
- Big City Wings
- Hugh O'Conner's
- Red Robin
- Warehouse 72

Entertainment

- Dave & Buster's
- Escape It: Houston
- Houston Improv
- Immersive Gamebox
- Little Beakers
- Regal Edwards Theater
- Sloomoo Institute

Health & Wellness

- LA Fitness

The entertainment center has a Regal Edwards movie theater, whose IMAX auditorium has the largest commercial movie theater screen, measuring 57 by 75 feet (17 by 23 m).
