= Hard Candy Fitness =

American fitness center chain

- Industry: Health clubs
- Founded: 2010
- Founder: Madonna, Guy Oseary, Mark Mastrov
- Defunct: 2019
- Headquarters: United States
- Area served: Worldwide
- Products: Gyms, Fitness programs, DVD series
- Divisions: Berlin, Germany; Mexico City, Mexico; Milan, Italy; Moscow, Russia; Rome, Italy; Santiago, Chile; St. Petersburg, Russia; Sydney, Australia

Hard Candy Fitness was a chain of fitness centres that were a partnership between Madonna, her manager Guy Oseary and Mark Mastrov, the founder and CEO of 24 Hour Fitness. Founded in 2010, the venture had centres in Berlin (8 clubs), Mexico City, Moscow, Rome, Santiago, St. Petersburg, and Sydney. The company's name was a reference to Madonna's 2008 studio album Hard Candy. The German division went into administration in 2016 and closed its studios that year. That same year, the location in Toronto was rebranded as Aura Fitness after the initial media attention didn't translate into gym memberships. The only club remaining in operation as of 2019 was in Santiago, Chile, which rebranded as Energy Sport Club in May 2019.

== History ==
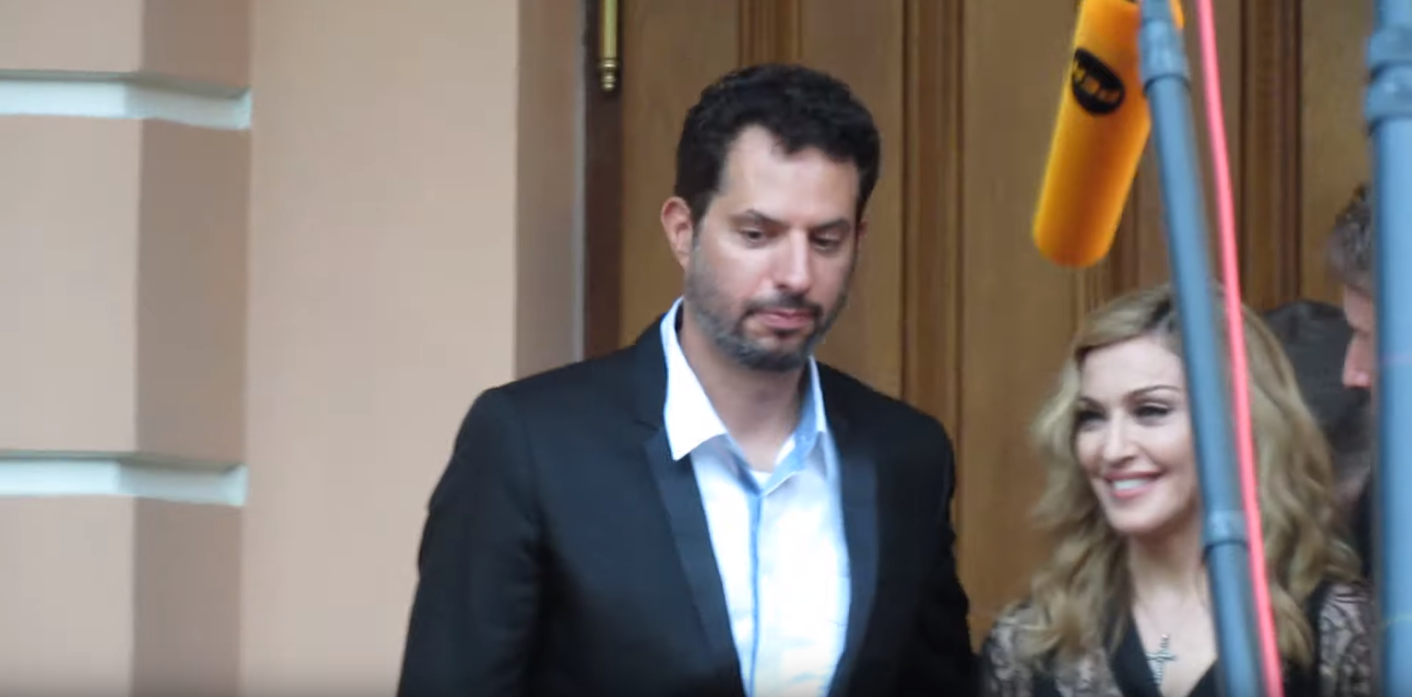
Oseary and Madonna during the opening of the Australian branch in 2012.

The fitness clubs were founded in 2010 as a partnership between Madonna, her manager Guy Oseary and New Evolution Ventures (NEV). An initial meeting between Mark Mastrov (the innovator behind 24 Hour Fitness and NEV) and Oseary was held in early in 2008. With Mastrov's partner Jim Rowley of NEV, Craig Pepin-Donat, the Vice President of Marketing and Development, along with Madonna and Oseary, they created the business venture.

The first club opened in Mexico City in November 2010 with Madonna visiting the gym on the 29th for the official launch. Since then the company has opened clubs in Russia, Australia and Chile. In January 2013, it was announced that a sixth fitness club would be opened in Rome, Italy in May. In June 2013, it was announced that a seventh fitness club would be opened in Berlin, Germany in September.

== Locations ==
| Opened | Closed | Region | Country | City | Address |
|---|---|---|---|---|---|
| 2015 October | Rebranded in 2018 | Europe | Italy | Milan | Via Parini 1, 20121 |
| 2015 October | Rebranded in 2018 | Europe | Italy | Milan | Via Bronzino 15, 20121 |
| 2015 March | | Europe | Germany | Fürth | Rudolf-Breitscheid-Straße |
| 2014 February | closed | North America | Canada | Toronto | Aura building, 382 Yonge Street, 4th Floor, Toronto ON, Canada M5B 1S8 |
| 2014 January | | Europe | Italy | Rome | Viale Romania, 22, 00197 Roma |
| 2013 October | 2016 | Europe | Germany | Berlin | schönhauser Allee 112, Berlin Prenzlauer Berg, 10439 |
| 2013 August | | Europe | Italy | Rome | Via Capo D'Africa 5, 00184, HCF Colosseo 06-70490452 HCF Parioli 06-8075577 |
| 2012 September | 2016 August | Oceania | Australia | Sydney | 48 Druitt Street, Sydney, NSW Australia 2000 |
| 2012 July | Rebranded in 2019 | South America | Chile | Santiago | Parque Araucano, Presidente Riesco 5330, Las Condes |
| 2011 December | 2017 July | Eurasia | Russia | Moscow | B.Kislovskiy per 9 |
| 2011 July | 2018 July | Eurasia | Russia | St. Petersburg | Petrogradskaya nab., 18, 197046 |
| 2010 November | Rebranded in 2019 | North America | Mexico | Mexico City | Bosque de Duraznos No. 47, Col. Bosque de las Lomas. 52457550 y 51 |

== DVD series ==
The enterprise launched a DVD series, Addicted to Sweat, in 2012. They feature the exclusive programs created by Madonna and demonstrated by her personal trainer Nicole Winhoffer. The videos were previously available only at the fitness clubs.

The following are included in the Addicted to Sweat series:

- Volume 1 – Dance: Get Sweat –structured like a dance class, Winhoffer breaks down all steps in this tutorial-style DVD.
- Volume 2 – Jaw Breaker Towel: Slippery When Wet – a unique, total body conditioning workout that targets every muscle during a short, intense routine that pays special attention to abs, core, arms, chest and back.
- Volume 3 – Dance: Wet, Wet, Wild – building from Volume 1, featuring more diverse moves that increase the power of the workout.
- Volume 4 – Jaw Breaker Chair: Dripping Wet – chair and the floor workout aimed at sculpting, toning and tightening the entire body.

== See also ==
- Madonna and business
