= Fitness First =

British multinational fitness center chain

Fitness First Ltd.
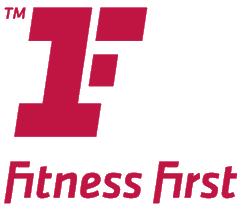
- Type: Private
- Industry: Health clubs
- Founded: 1993; 33 years ago
- Founder: Mike Balfour
- Headquarters: Wigan, United Kingdom
- Number of locations: 360 clubs
- Area served: 17 countries
- Services: Health and wellness services
- Owner: Evolution Wellness (Asia); Fitness and Lifestyle Group, a division of Quadrant Private Equity (Australia); Landmark Group (Middle east)

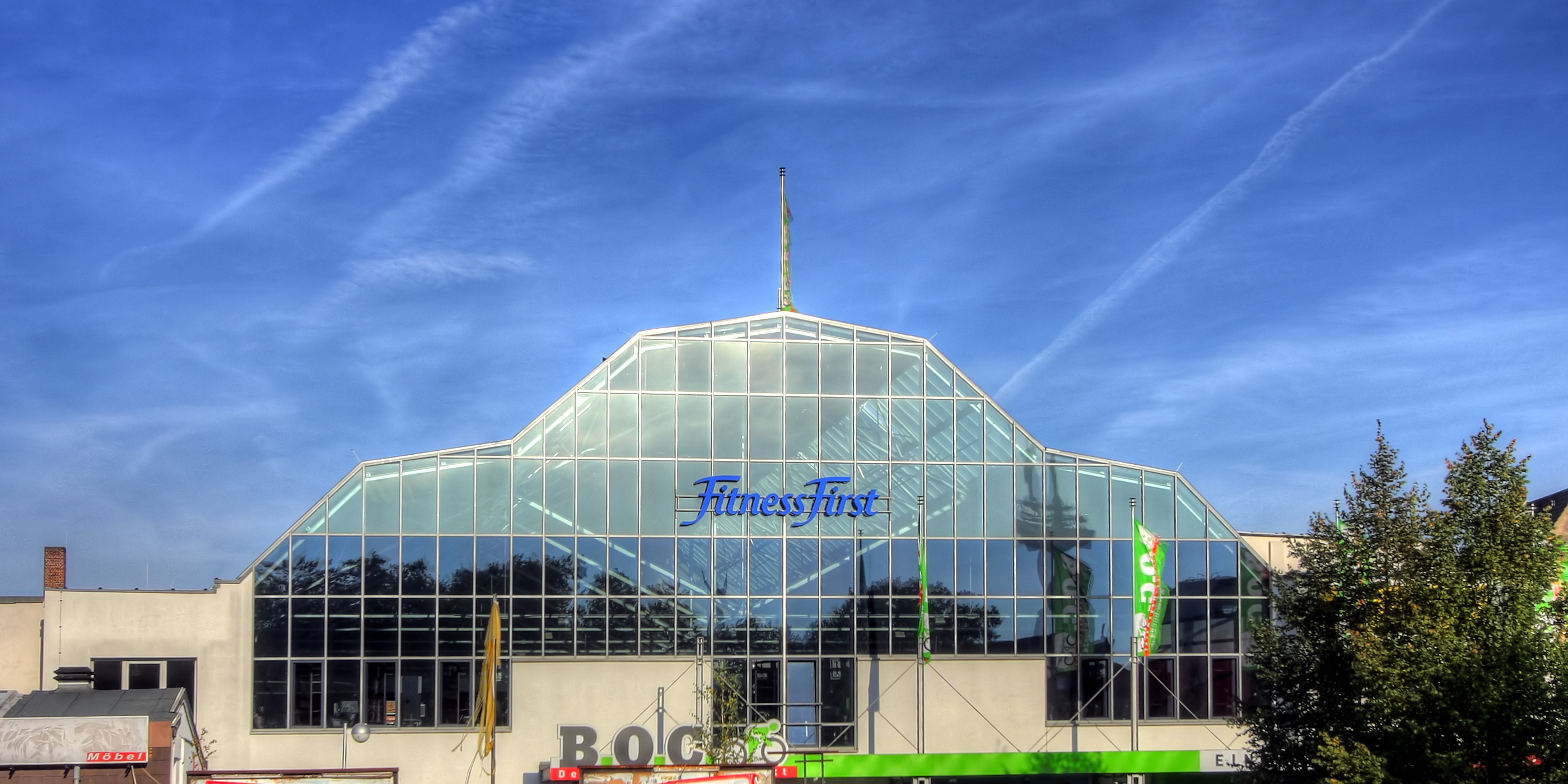
Fitness First studio in Cologne, Germany

Fitness First is an international fitness centre brand founded in 1993 in the United Kingdom. The company owned and operated its clubs around the world until financial pressures saw parts of the company sold off to various owners in different regions.

== History ==
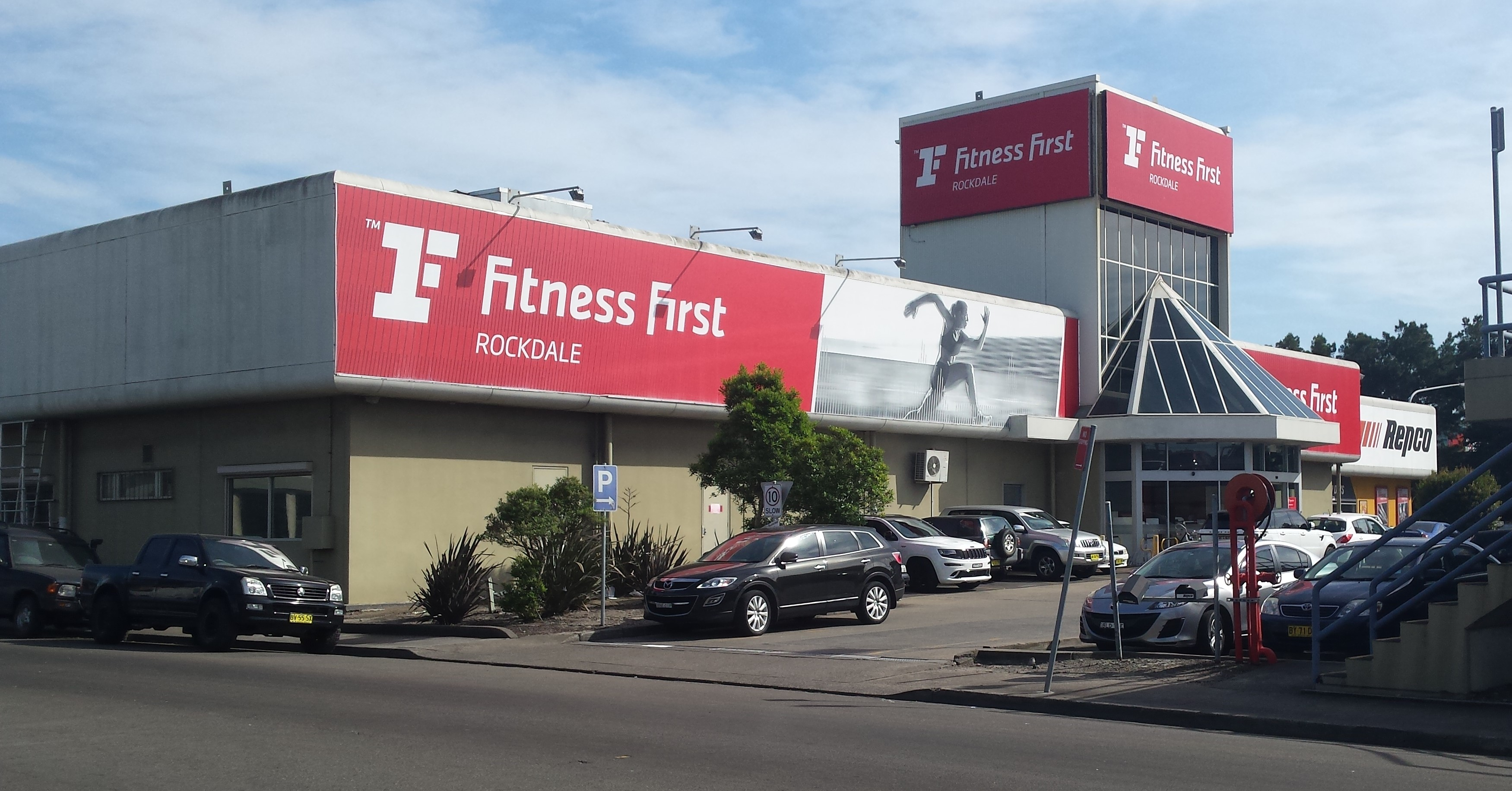
A Fitness First gym in suburban Sydney, Australia in 2016.

The first Fitness First club was opened by Mike Balfour in 1993 in Bournemouth, UK.

Fitness First entered the Australian market in 2000 after buying assets from the collapsed Healthland chain and acquiring a number of Living Well Lady locations owned by the Hilton Group in 2006.

In 2003, the company was sold to Cinven for £404 million, making the company private, and re-sold in 2005 to BC Partners for £835 million, at a time when EBITDA was around £95 million. The company opened its first clubs in India in 2008.

By 2012, a high debt, a failed IPO, and increasing competition from low-cost fitness chains forced the company to abandon expansion plans and had to sell clubs in Spain, Italy, and Benelux-member nations and sell off 24 of its 97 Australian clubs. It was subsequently acquired by Oaktree Capital Management and Marathon Asset Management through a £550 million debt-for-equity swap.

Since then, ownership of the company has been diluted around the world, largely due to sustained losses. The Australian arm of Fitness First was sold in 2016 to the Fitness and Lifestyle Group. In the same year, DW Sports Fitness acquired all 62 Fitness First clubs in the UK, selling 14 of those and continuing to operate 48 under the Fitness First brand. In 2017, the Fitness First Asia business that was operating in Hong Kong, Indonesia, Malaysia, Philippines, Singapore, and Thailand, merged with Celebrity Fitness to create Evolution Wellness, co-owned by Oaktree and Navis Capital Partners.

== Products and services ==
Fitness First is the company behind International Fitness Week, which takes place each February. Initiatives in 2009 have included the launch of Strictly Fit in conjunction with BBC Worldwide, intended to be a low-impact aerobics group class.

The company opened the concept club ‘The Zone’ in Australia in 2013. In 2014, Fitness First launched their Global Rebrand and opened ‘BEAT’; a heart rate based training micro gym in London, and their Australia club in Melbourne the same year.

On 21 January 2014, Fitness First in Australia officially relaunched, changing its logo. Jane Fonda was the brand ambassador for the relaunch.

The Asian arm of Fitness First developed a reality television show called Fit for Fashion. There were two seasons of the show, which aired in October 2014 and January 2016 respectively.

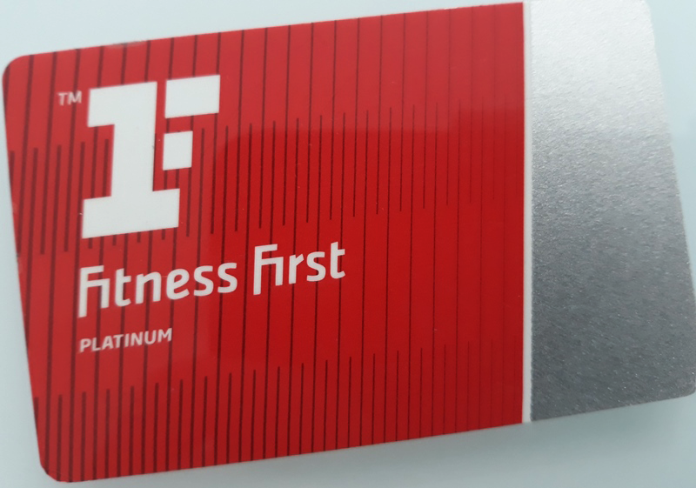
An Australian Fitness First Platinum membership card

== Controversies ==
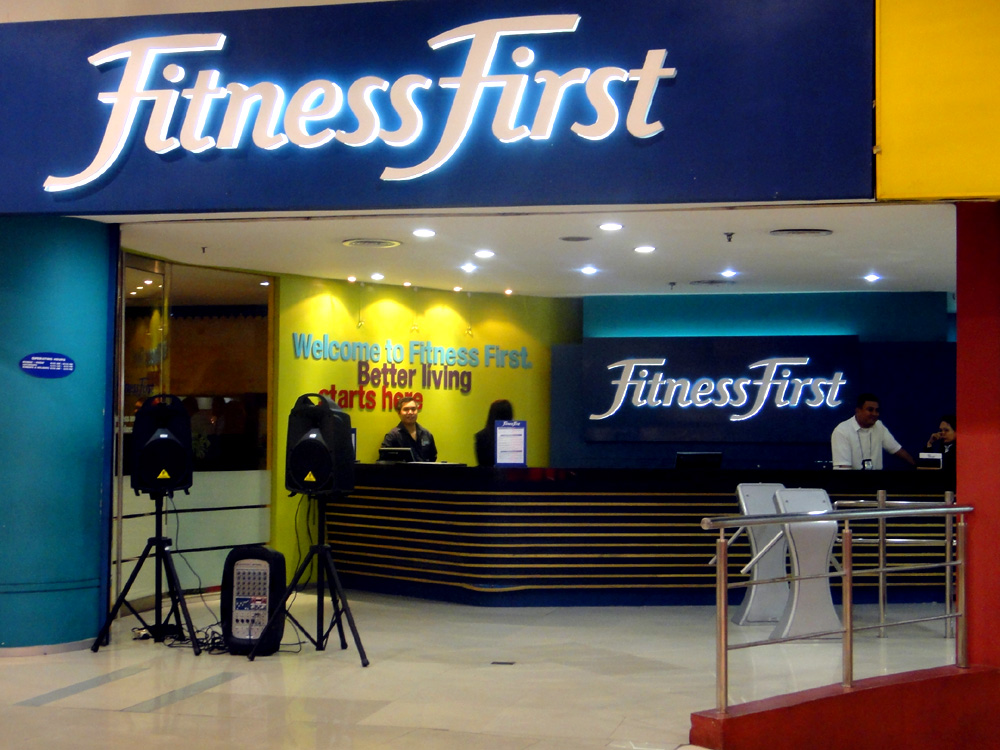
Fitness First at Robinsons Mall, Manila, Philippines

There have been historical cases where direct debit accounts were still debited after the member had cancelled their membership.

In a July 2004 study comparing Fitness First with other Australian gyms, Fitness First respondents were less likely to have been shown how to use equipment by a qualified staff member, offered a fitness assessment or advised on an appropriate exercise routine.

In August 2008, Fitness First took a club member to the Australian New South Wales (NSW) Supreme Court to recover a $200 cancellation fee. The court ruled in favour of Fitness First, although she could not afford to pay and was no longer able to use the gym on medical grounds. The patient explained her medical condition before signing up and was instructed to sign the contract. Fitness First sought action to ensure that gym contracts with clients were still legally valid even if the court were to find that the client did not understand what he or she had signed. Fitness First's victory on appeal overturned a prior decision against the company by the NSW Consumer, Trader and Tenancy Tribunal, which had found that a contract required a "meeting of the minds, in that they each fully know and understand the terms and conditions of the agreement".

In March 2009, a Sydney Fitness First trainer allegedly attacked a member after a dispute about closing times, pushing him down a flight of stairs. The member spent the night in hospital with a broken nose and seven stitches to the forehead from a deep gash.

In May 2009, the Australian consumer magazine "Choice" found Fitness First to have the most aggressive psychological techniques in getting customers to sign complicated contracts and not explaining what the cancellation policy is, in a test involving "shadow shoppers" visiting two gyms run by Fitness First, Contours, Fernwood Fitness, Curves and Virgin Active.

In 2018, Mick Hawi was shot dead by criminals at a Fitness First gym in Sydney. The criminals ambushed him just as he was getting into his black Mercedes and fled in a getaway car before dumping it and setting it on fire. They were arrested but found not guilty.

In 2023 members of the United Workers Union launched a campaign against underpayment, wage cuts, and poor work conditions at over 150 Fitness First and Goodlife Health Clubs. Within a few months instructors successfully pressured management to concede to their demands.

== List of countries ==
- Australia
- United Kingdom
- Germany
- Bahrain
- Jordan
- Kuwait
- Qatar
- United Arab Emirates
- India
- Hong Kong (Under Voluntary Liquidation since 2022)
- Indonesia
- Malaysia
- Philippines
- Singapore
- Thailand
- Libya

== See also ==
- Australian Institute of Personal Trainers
