= List of long-course swimming pools in Ireland =

This page contains list of the long course swimming pools in Ireland. It includes pools that conform to the Olympic standard which are 50 x 25 metres with 10 lanes. It also list the pools that are 50 meters, but are not quite up to the Olympic standard.

== Olympic standard pools in the Republic of Ireland ==
- University of Limerick, Castletroy, Limerick, opened 2002
- National Aquatic Centre, Abbotstown, North Dublin, opened 2003
- University College Dublin, Belfield, South Dublin, opened 2012

== Other 50m pools in the Republic of Ireland ==
- West Wood Club, Clontarf, Dublin – 50 metres, 6 lanes, members only pool opened in 2000 (the first modern indoor 50 metre pool in Ireland)

== Northern Ireland ==
There are 50 meter pools in Northern Ireland too:

- South Lake Leisure Centre, in Craigavon, County Armagh
- Bangor Aurora
