= Bally Total Fitness =

American fitness club chain

- Company type: Public
- Industry: Fitness
- Founded: 1983; 43 years ago
- Defunct: October 2016; 9 years ago
- Fate: Chapter 11 bankruptcy Liquidation events
- Headquarters: Chicago, Illinois, U.S.
- Area served: United States
- Website: ballytotalfitness.com

Bally Total Fitness was an American fitness club chain. At its 2007 peak, prior to the filing of the first of two Chapter 11 bankruptcies, Bally operated nearly 440 facilities located in 29 U.S. states, Mexico, Canada, South Korea, China, and the Caribbean under the Bally Total Fitness, Crunch Fitness, Gorilla Sports, Pinnacle Fitness, Bally Sports Clubs, and Sports Clubs of Canada brands.

== History ==
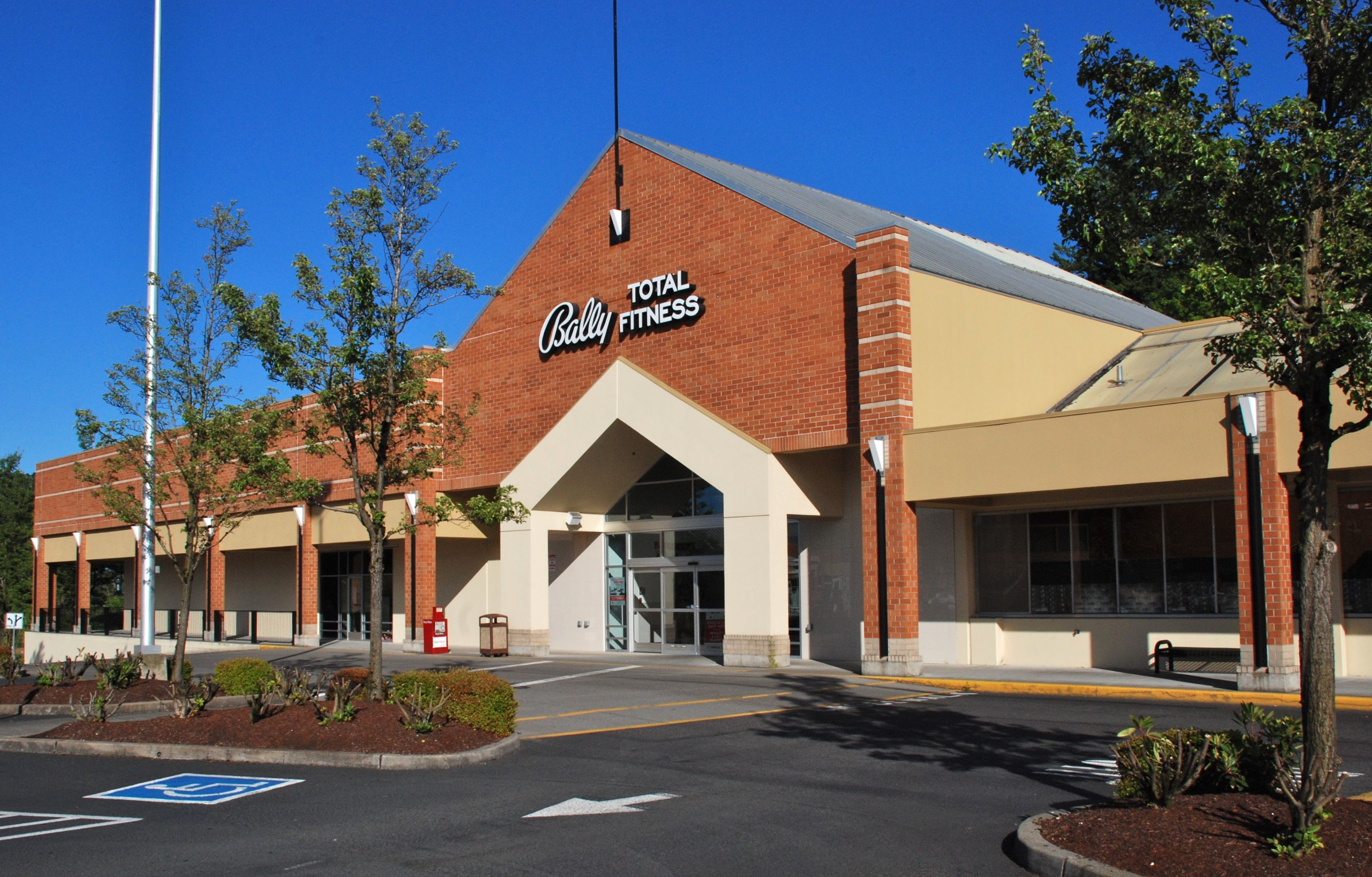
A Bally gym in Cedar Mill, Oregon in July 2011. The gym building was renovated the following year into an Orchard Supply Hardware.

In 1983, slot-machine and arcade game manufacturer Bally Manufacturing purchased Health and Tennis Corporation of America, entering the leisure industry and creating the Bally Health and Tennis Corporation division of the company. It also purchased Lifecycle (Life Fitness), an exercise bike manufacturer, renaming the company Bally Fitness Products.

In 1987, Bally was the world's largest owner and operator of fitness centers. It further expanded with the purchase of the American Fitness Centers and Nautilus Fitness Centers, which were once connected to Vic Tanny and Jack LaLanne.

The various brands were consolidated under the Bally Total Fitness brand in 1995. By that year, the company was the world's largest owner and operator of health clubs. It operated a total of 325 health clubs in the United States and Canada. The rebranding was done to take advantage of the Bally name as well as rename the existing Tanny and LaLanne locations.

In 1996, Bally Total Fitness was spun off from its casino-owning parent. In May 1998, it was listed on the New York Stock Exchange trading under the ticker symbol of BFT. The company carried $300 million in debt at the time of its initial public offering.

Paul Toback, a former White House aide in the Clinton administration, who had joined Bally as a corporate development officer in 1997, was named Chief Executive Officer (CEO) in December 2002, immediately after predecessor Lee Hillman resigned.

On November 18, 2011, Bally Total Fitness announced the sale of 171 of its clubs located in sixteen states and the District of Columbia to an affiliate of LA Fitness for $153 million. After the LA Fitness transaction, Bally had approximately 800,000 members; the sale allowed Bally to retire its corporate debt.

In April 2012, Bally sold an additional 39 facilities to Blast Fitness. Blast Fitness began operating the new facilities under their own name in stages, transitioning entirely away from the Bally's name.

The two sales left Bally with 44 locations, 27 of them in the New York area, 8 in the San Francisco area, 1 in Louisiana and 8 in Colorado.

The number of clubs still in the Bally chain continued to dwindle. The Bally Total Fitness location in Danville, California closed on June 22, 2012 and reopened as Danville Fit. The former Bally club in Colorado Springs, Colorado, changed ownership in June 2014, and became Voretex Fitness.

In December 2014, 32 locations in New York, New Jersey, Denver, and San Francisco Bay Area were acquired by 24 Hour Fitness. The Greece, New York location closed without notice on December 30, 2014.

The 106th St location in New York City became a Tapout Fitness center in August 2016, and the last Bally location in NYC closed on October 26, also becoming a Tapout Fitness center. As a result, Bally Total Fitness became completely defunct.

As of 2026, the Bally Total Fitness name was still being used for a line of fitness equipment and clothing owned by FAM Brands.

== Bankruptcies ==
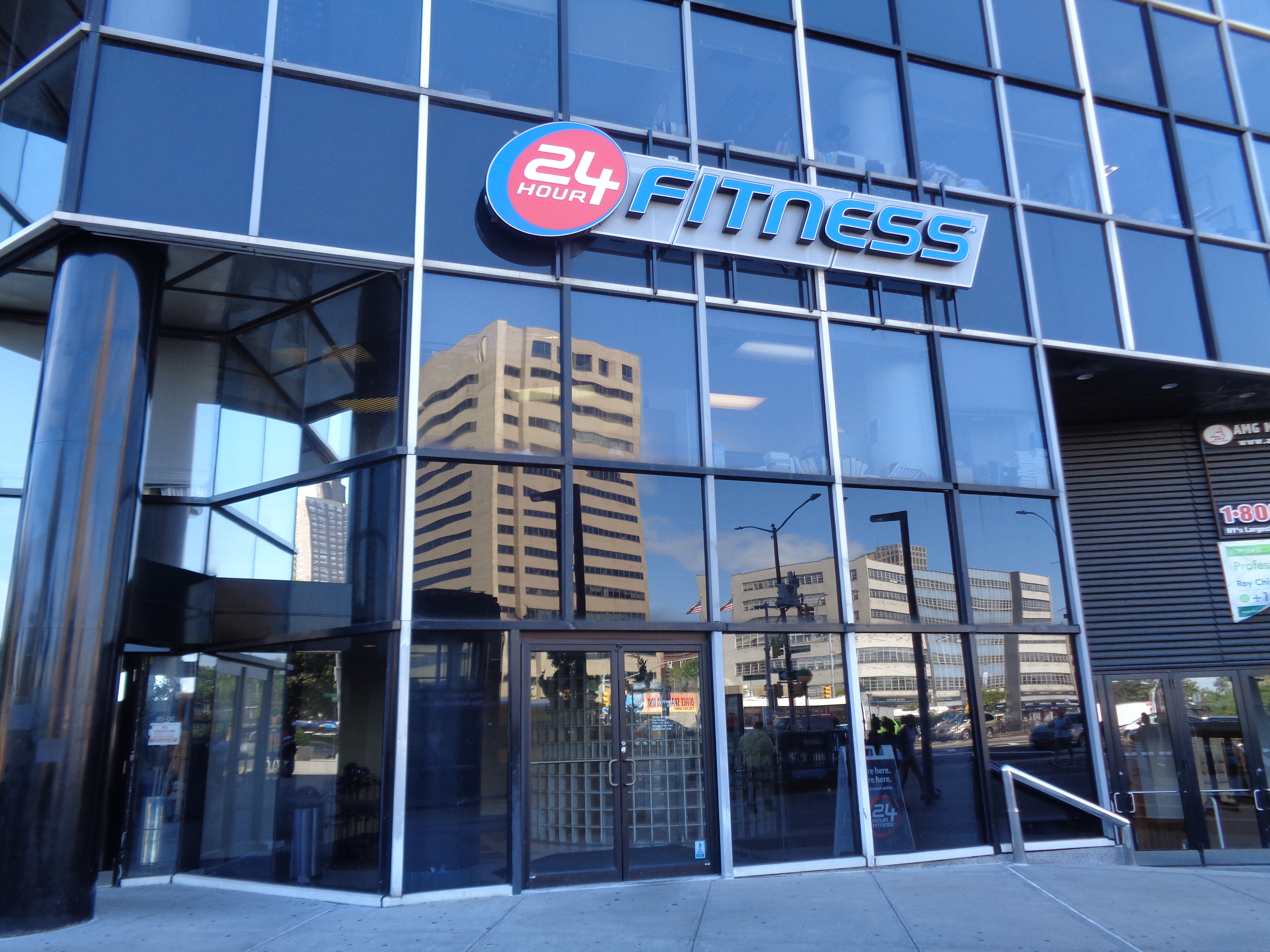
A former Bally Total Fitness renovated into a 24 Hour Fitness

Bally filed for bankruptcy in August 2007, with outstanding debts of $761 million. Over the preceding ten years, its stock price had fallen from a high of approximately US$37.00 to less than $0.37 on the Pink Sheets, a plunge of over 99% of its value. It was removed from the NYSE shortly thereafter.

On October 1, 2007, Bally announced its emergence from bankruptcy court protection, 100% owned by a hedge fund, Harbinger Capital. Earlier that year, it had sold off its 16 Toronto health clubs to existing chains: 10 locations were sold to GoodLife Fitness, and 6 to Extreme Fitness, allowing the latter company its first move into the downtown core for what had heretofore been a suburban chain.

On December 3, 2008, Bally again filed for bankruptcy due to problems arising from the global credit crisis. The company indicated at that time that it would explore options including reorganization or possibly even a sale, but that it hoped to emerge from bankruptcy as soon as possible.

== Investigations and controversies ==
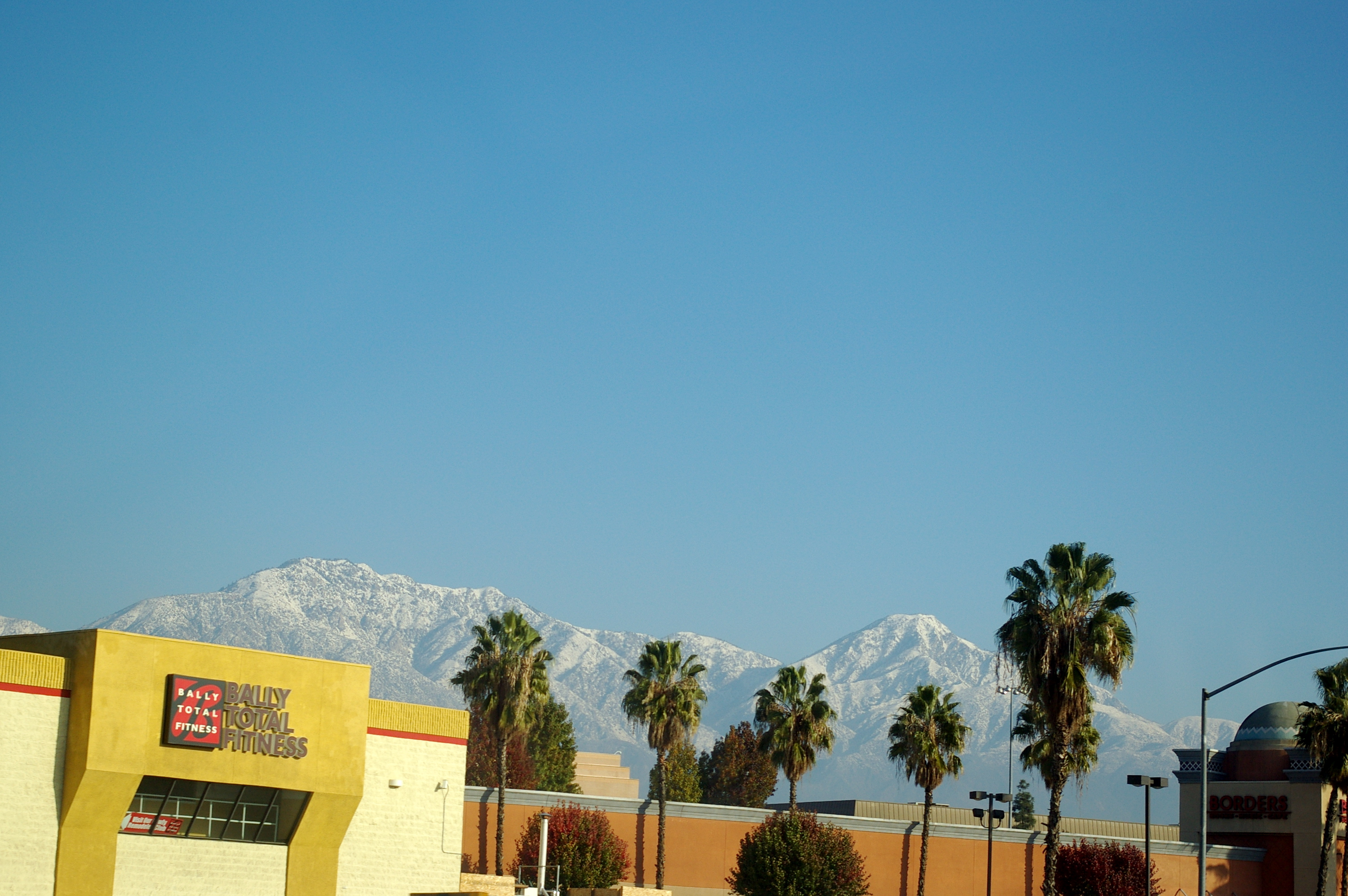
Exterior of now defunct Bally Total Fitness from 2008

Bally Total Fitness has been the subject of controversy over its sales and membership cancellation practices, with some customers claiming they were misled into signing loans with terms up to three years using documents containing uncommonly-used language such as "Retail Installment Contract". Customers alleged that they subsequently found themselves dealing with collection agencies.

In April 1994, Bally paid $120,000 to settle Federal Trade Commission charges of illegal billing, cancellation, refund, and debt-collection practices. Consumers have complained, however, that little has changed over the years. From 1999 to 2004, over six hundred customers complained to the New York Attorney General's office, leading to an investigation and subsequent agreement by Bally Total Fitness to reform their sales tactics in February 2004.

In 1997, Bally’s became the subject of a pioneering type of website that published consumer complaints. Bally’s club members Drew Faber and Ryan Meyer believed they were subjected to a bait and switch marketing scheme by Bally’s, so they decided to create a website called “Bally Sucks.” On it, Faber and Meyer put Bally’s trademark with the word “sucks” printed across it. The website also collected complaints from Bally’s customers and published them.

Bally’s sued Faber and Meyer for trademark infringement, trademark dilution, and unfair competition. A federal district court, however, ruled in favor of Faber and Meyer, concluding that there is no likelihood that consumers would confuse Faber’s and Meyer's mark, which is critical of Bally’s, with Bally’s actual trademark. The court also held that Faber and Meyer did not dilute Bally’s trademark or engage in unfair competition. After the court’s decision, Bally’s and Meyer agreed to a settlement. But the case had already rendered a roadmap for consumer complaint websites. The settlement included confidentiality and nondisparagement provisions, so Meyer was forced to decline all media requests for interviews.

Bally has been the subject of at least one federal investigation, in addition to the aforementioned probe into consumer complaints against Bally, conducted by the New York State Attorney General, regarding the firm's sales practices. In April 2004, Bally disclosed the U.S. Securities and Exchange Commission (SEC) was investigating its accounting practices, and in February 2005, the U.S. Justice Department joined the probe. The company eventually restated its financial statements for 1997 through 2003.

On February 28, 2008, the SEC filed financial fraud charges against Bally Total Fitness. The SEC alleged that in 2001, Bally overstated its originally reported stockholder's equity by roughly $1.8 billion (over 340%), and that Bally underestimated its 2003 net loss by $90.8 million (or 845%).

In 2010, Texas Attorney General Greg Abbott announced that the company had mailed over 11,000 fake past-due notices to former members. The Attorney General charged that Bally had urged consumers to immediately pay their late fees and that the conduct was part of a scheme to get consumers to re-join the club.
