= Snap Fitness =

US multinational fitness center franchise

- Company type: Private
- Genre: Fitness
- Founded: 2003; 23 years ago
- Founders: Peter Taunton; Chad Kirchoff
- Headquarters: Chanhassen, Minnesota, U.S.
- Key people: Ty Menzies (CEO)
- Website: snapfitness.com

Snap Fitness is a privately owned global chain of 24/7 fitness centers headquartered in Chanhassen, Minnesota, United States. It was founded in 2003 and currently operates over 1,000 locations in over 17 countries across 5 continents, with almost a million members.

Snap Fitness is associated by ownership and otherwise with other fitness and franchise businesses through its parent Lift Brands and various affiliate companies. Those brands include Fitness On Demand and Fitstop.

== History ==
Snap Fitness was founded in 2003 by Peter Taunton and Chad Kirchoff. A few years later, Kirchoff decided to pursue full-time religious ministry, and sold his half of the business.

The first Snap Fitness location opened in River Falls, Wisconsin, in 2004.

=== International expansion ===
In 2007, Snap Fitness opened its first international location, expanding into Canada with a location in Winnipeg, Manitoba.

By 2008, Snap Fitness had 910 clubs with 400,000 members in 46 states in the U.S., and continued its global expansion with its first club in India, as well as adding locations in Australia and New Zealand. In 2009, Snap Fitness continued to expand with locations in Mexico.

In 2010, the company opened its first location in New Zealand in Papanui, Christchurch, and in 2012 opened its first United Kingdom location in Milton Keynes.

By 2015, Snap Fitness entered Spain, The Netherlands, Belgium, Luxembourg, Georgia, and the Philippines by way of separate Master Franchise Agreements for each country. That same year, the company signed a Master Franchise Agreement with Saudi Arabia. In late April 2016, Snap Fitness announced that the company had secured a major development deal for the United Kingdom with MSG Life Limited.

An Area Developer Agreement was signed for Ireland in August 2016 and in 2017, Snap Fitness signed agreements with Hong Kong, Taiwan, Indonesia, Singapore, Malaysia, Vietnam, Thailand, Sri Lanka and Bangladesh.

Tim McGraw’s Signature Snap Fitness club, TRUMAV, opened in January 2019 in Nashville, Tennessee.

In October 2024, Snap Fitness opened its 100th location across the United Kingdom and Ireland. There are over 500 Snap Fitness gyms in North America, 130+ in Europe and 350+ in Asia and the Pacific.

=== Recent changes ===
In 2019, then-CEO Peter Taunton stepped down from his role to become the nonexecutive chairman of the Lift Brands’ board, where he served as a strategic advisor and Tom Welter, then Lift Brands’ chief operating officer, took over as interim CEO. In August 2020, Ty Menzies was appointed to Global CEO for Lift Brands.

Throughout the early 2020s, Snap Fitness went through an extensive rebrand to its current “For the Feeling” model, which emphasizes how fitness makes you feel over how it makes you look.
