= West Wood Club =

West Wood Club is a privately owned company which operates a chain of fitness centres in Dublin, Ireland. The first gym was founded in 1994. There are six gyms in the chain, including at Clontarf Road on the Northside, and Leopardstown and Sandymount on the Southside.

At the time of its opening, the Clontarf Road facility housed what was then the first 50-metre indoor swimming pool in Ireland. It is also home to an 11-metre indoor climbing wall. From 2003 to 2010, a visitor centre which focused on the life and works of author Bram Stoker operated from the Clontarf Road location. Stoker, who wrote the classic Dracula novel, was born nearby.

== See also ==
- List of Olympic-size swimming pools in Ireland
