= Crunch Fitness =

Membership-based fitness and training gym

Crunch Holdings LLC
- Trade name: Crunch Fitness
- Native name: Crunch
- Type: Franchise
- Industry: Health club
- Founded: 1989
- Founder: Doug Levine
- Headquarters: New York City, United States
- Number of locations: 500
- Key people: Jim Rowley (Worldwide CEO); Chequan Lewis (President); Molly Long (COO); Dan Gallagher (CFO); Chad Waetzig (CMO)
- Brands: Crunch Signature, Crunch Select, Crunch Fitness
- Members: 3 million
- Website: www.crunch.com

Crunch Fitness is a US-based brand of over 500 franchised and corporate owned fitness clubs located in the United States, Canada, Spain, Portugal, Costa Rica, and Australia. Founded by Doug Levine in 1989, its current Worldwide CEO is Jim Rowley.

== History ==
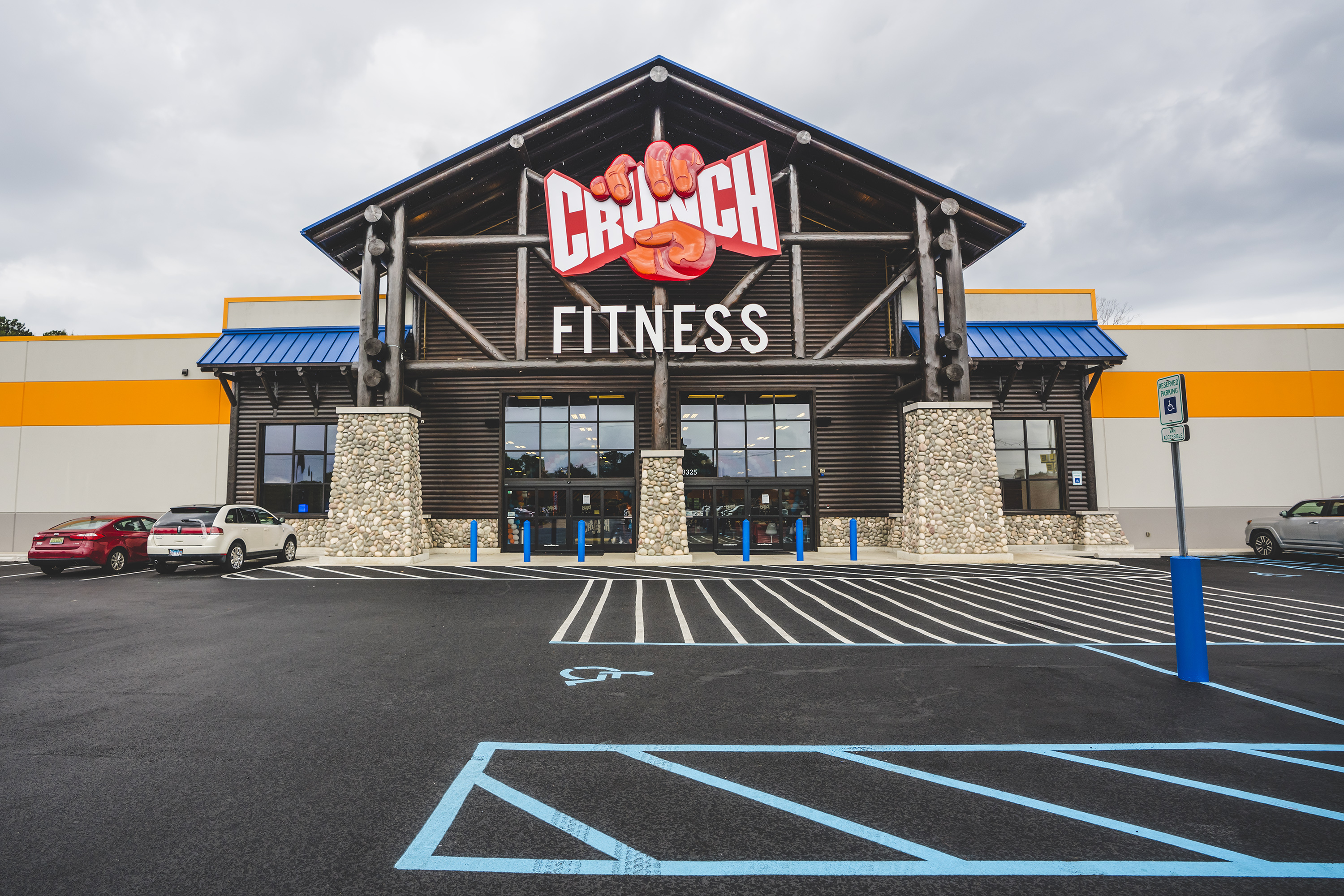
Exterior Crunch Fitness

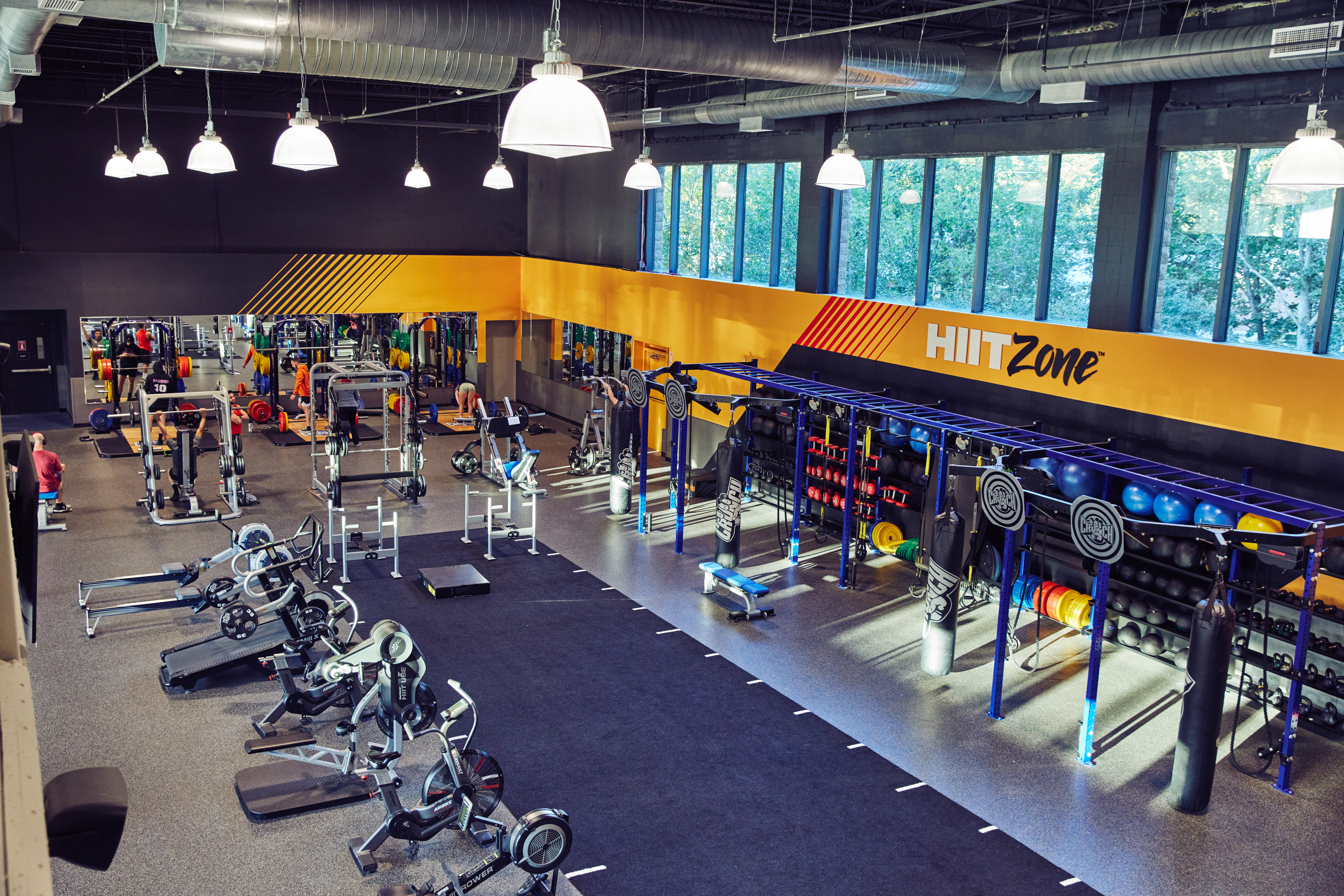
Interior Crunch Fitness

Crunch was founded in NYC's Greenwich Village in 1989 by Doug Levine, a former stockbroker. Crunch began as a fitness studio in a small basement. Levine came up with the "No Judgments" philosophy to remove the intimidation factor from going to the gym as well as combining this model with entertainment and diverse offerings, keeping members inspired to work out. The clubs became successful by appealing to young upscale members and by selling logo merchandise.

On May 6, 2009, Crunch filed for Chapter 11 bankruptcy in the United States.

The gym's model began as a welcoming place for diverse groups of people to get fit, focusing on group workouts and combining entertainment with exercise. Crunch began franchising in 2010. The first franchise location was Crunch Norwalk (Connecticut). In 2019, Crunch had 1.5 million members across 325 gyms in 30 States, Puerto Rico, Australia, Spain, and Canada.

While many chains struggled during the pandemic, Crunch Fitness held its footing by offering virtual classes via Crunch Live, said CEO Ben Midgley. Before the pandemic, he said that Crunch Live was available only to top-tier members, but it was rolled out to all members during the health crisis. Participation jumped 150% to about 100,000 workouts daily by July 2020. When clubs started to reopen, that number declined. The chain opened 40 clubs during the pandemic, including two Long Island sites, and systemwide membership was up 31% compared to pre-pandemic levels in February 2020.

In February 2022, Crunch opened its 400th location in San Angelo, Texas. Also in February, Crunch launched "Strengthened by Heroes", a military-based employment initiative.

In June 2022, Crunch celebrated reaching the 2 million member mark.

Following the success of Crunch Live, the company introduced a new streaming online workout platform called Crunch+. This new platform hosts hundreds of on-demand workouts, live-streamed workouts, and includes a web browser version, along with native iOS, tvOS, Android, Amazon Fire, and Android TV apps. After piloting in late 2022, the platform launched globally in February 2023.

=== Ownership ===
Bally Total Fitness acquired Crunch in 2001 for $90 million in cash and company shares, holding the brand for four years. In 2005 Angelo, Gordon & Co., a private equity firm, purchased Crunch from Ballys for $45 million, and in 2009 added New Evolution Fitness Company ("NEFC"/New Evolution Ventures), a company founded by Mark Mastrov (founder of 24 hour fitness) and fitness Veteran Jim Rowley, as an equity and operating partner.

On July 1, 2019, it was announced that private-equity firm TPG was acquiring Crunch Fitness through its growth-equity unit.

In April 2025, Crunch announced a strategic investment from Leonard Green & Partners, where Leonard Green would acquire a majority interest in Crunch Fitness from TPG Growth.

Of Crunch Fitness' 405 clubs in the United States and five other countries, 92% are franchises. Crunch will assist franchisee owners in finding a site, financing, club design, and construction, public relations and marketing, operations, infrastructure, and training.

Crunch is led by Worldwide CEO Jim Rowley and President Chequan Lewis.

=== Partnerships ===
On August 25, 2021, Pegula Sports & Entertainment announced a multi-year extension with Crunch Fitness as an Official Partner of the Buffalo Bills.

Also in 2021, Crunch partnered with Olivia Newton-John to raise money for Cancer treatment research. During this partnership, Crunch set a Guinness World Record for the most people simultaneously performing lying lateral leg raises.

== Group fitness classes ==
The clubs offer an array of group fitness classes, including stationary bike workouts, Pilates, Ride, TRX, Yoga, and Zumba. Crunch was an early adopter of these group exercises and the first gym to offer Zumba. Initially, Crunch Fitness featured some unusual classes such as bicycle-based yoga, coed wrestling, and an "Abs, Thighs and Gossip" class run by a drag queen. As early as 1997, Crunch offered pole dancing and capoeira. Although the classes were later standardized across various locations, some popular offbeat classes remain, such as karaoke bicycling, Pound, Antigravity Yoga, among others. For Crunch Fitness, there's been an online streaming platform incorporated into its membership model since 2013.

== Memberships ==
Crunch experienced a 5.6% growth in memberships from March 2020 to January 2021 across the company's franchise network. That includes 300 franchisee gyms and another 23 company-owned locations that follow a franchise business model.

The company has two primary categories of gyms: Crunch Signature and Crunch Fitness. Crunch Signature locations are premium, full-service clubs with monthly memberships that typically range from $85 to $130, mainly located in major metropolitan areas, and offer a wide array of services, classes, and amenities. Crunch Fitness locations offer group classes, advanced HIIT classes, and traditional gym services for $9.99 to $36.99 a month. As of 2022, 28 of Crunch's locations were Signature gyms.
