= EFM Health Clubs =

Australian health and fitness club franchise group

- Industry: Health and Fitness
- Founded: 1991
- Headquarters: Unley, South Australia, Australia

EFM Health Clubs is an Australian health and fitness club franchise group. The company operates over 65 franchised locations throughout Australia. EFM Health Clubs offer personal fitness coaching services to their members. The company is headquartered in Unley, South Australia. The company CEO is former Port Adelaide Football Club Operations Manager Peter Rohde, who commenced in the role in January 2014.

== History ==
EFM commenced operations in Unley, South Australia in 1991. The company was founded by former Australian rules footballer Shane Radbone while Matthew Lindblom assumed control of the company in 2000 and exited the role in 2014, making way for current CEO, Peter Rohde. The company is privately held.

== Operations ==
As of 2015, EFM have over 65 clubs nationally with locations in New South Wales, Queensland, South Australia, Tasmania and Victoria. EFM specialize in corporate health and fitness programs for the employees of major Australian hospitals. EFM Health Clubs also specialize in running on-site fitness programs for schools, with over 20 school programs running around Australia. EFM provide free commercial grade fitness equipment as well as professionally run programs for students, staff, past students, parents and the local school community. Tailored fitness programs are developed collaboratively to meet the needs of the school community and are integrated into the school's strategic plans.

== Awards ==
EFM Health Clubs were awarded a Bronze level of recognition in the 2012 Fitness Australia Quality Awards.

== Technology ==
EFM Health Clubs updated their company website in December 2013.
