= Orangetheory Fitness =

Fitness studio franchise

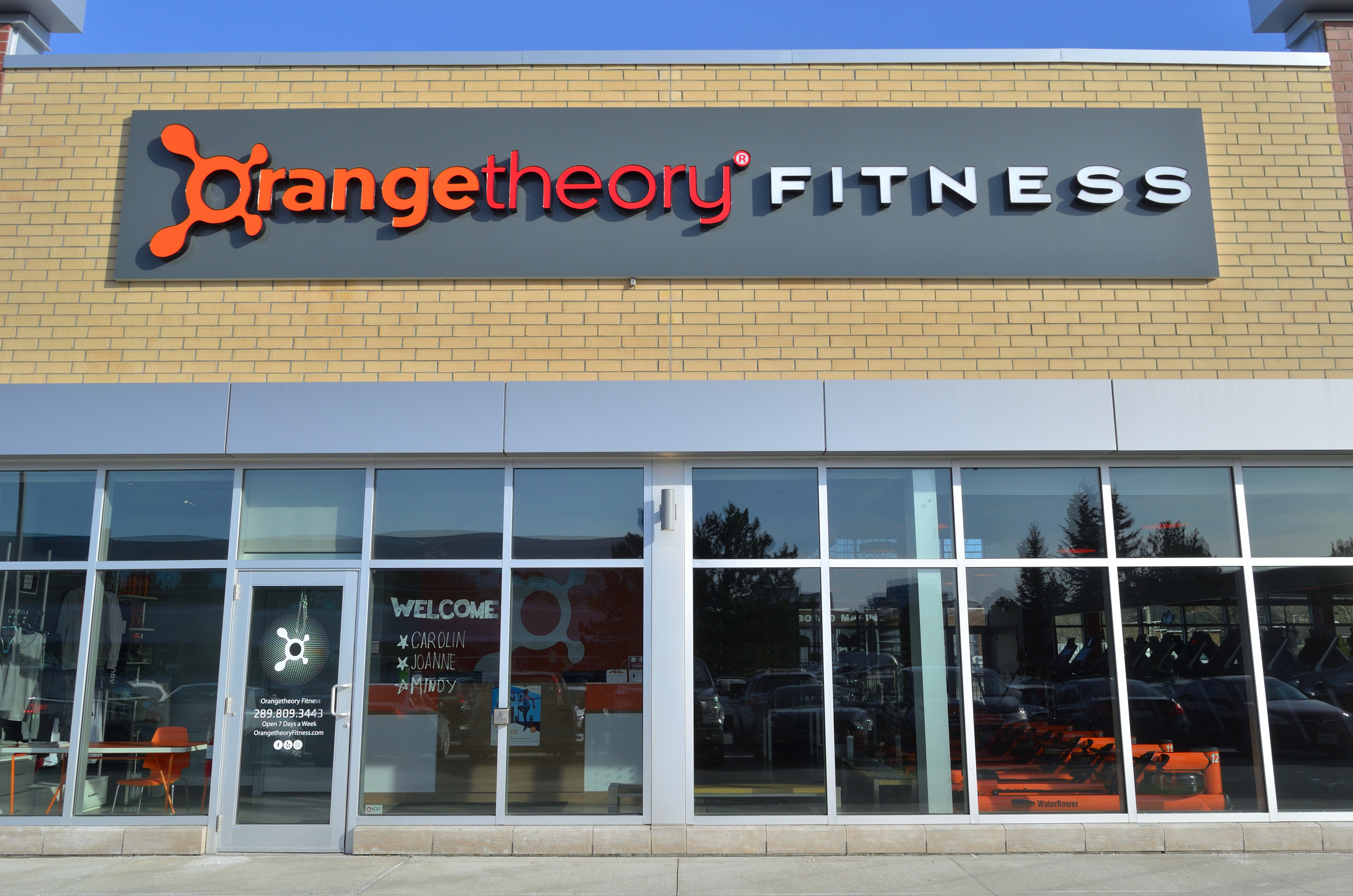
- An Orangetheory Fitness studio in Markham, Ontario
- Type: Private
- Industry: Fitness
- Founded: 2010; 16 years ago
- Founders: David Long, Jerome Kern, Ellen Latham
- Headquarters: Boca Raton, Florida, United States
- Number of locations: 1,500 (2023)
- Areas served: Australia, Bahrain, Canada, Chile, China, Colombia, Costa Rica, Denmark, Dominican Republic, Germany, Guatemala, Hong Kong, India, Israel, Japan, Kuwait, Mexico, New Zealand, Peru, Puerto Rico, Qatar, Saudi Arabia, Singapore, Spain, United Arab Emirates, United Kingdom, United States
- Parent: Company Founders (2010–2016), Roark Capital Group (2016–)
- Website: www.orangetheory.com

Orangetheory Fitness (OTF) is a boutique fitness studio franchise, operating globally and based in Boca Raton, Florida. The first studio was established in Fort Lauderdale, Florida, in 2010 by founder, Ellen Latham. The signature classes are one hour long and involve two or three groups, one on the treadmills and the other group working with weights or on rowers. Since its founding in 2010, the chain has expanded, surpassing $1 billion in systemwide sales in 2018, with over one million members in 2020. As of 2023, Orangetheory Fitness has over 1,500 studios throughout 50 US states and 24 countries.

In 2024, Orangetheory Fitness merged with the parent company of Anytime Fitness.

== History ==
Orangetheory Fitness was founded by exercise physiologist Ellen Latham, Jerome Kern, and David Long in March 2010. It is the successor to a Fort Lauderdale-based Pilates studio, "Ellen's Ultimate Workout", founded by Latham in the late 1990s.

Orangetheory Fitness was ranked No. 415 in Inc. magazine's "Fastest-Growing Private Companies" list and No. 255 in Entrepreneur magazine's 2016 "Franchise 500" list of top franchises in the world. Orangetheory had grown to 350 studios in 7 countries by 2016. That year it received growth equity investment from the private equity firm Roark Capital Group to support its domestic and international growth. Its position on the "Franchise 500" rose to No. 25 in 2019 and No. 43 in 2020. It had 1,200 studios by early 2020. In 2025 Orangetheory was #2 on the fitness Franchise 500 list.

=== COVID-19 pandemic response ===
On March 17, 2020, during the COVID-19 pandemic, Orangetheory Fitness closed all corporate-owned studios and encouraged franchisees to do the same.

During the closures, the company suspended membership fees and introduced at-home workout options.

During the closure, Orangetheory Fitness' Medical Advisory Board developed a plan for reopening. The new policies implemented follow the guidelines created by the Centers for Disease Control and Prevention, which consisted of "temperature checks before entry; reduced class sizes to maintain social distancing; redesigned workouts to minimize equipment cross-contamination; class scheduling modifications to allow for thorough sanitation protocols in between classes; training and implementation of electrostatic cleanings; temporarily closures of showers and towel service; recommended use of face masks by members; and required use personal protective equipment by all staff." Despite reopening their studios, however, the decision was made to continue providing their at-home workouts.

=== Merger ===
In late February 2024, it was announced that Orangetheory Fitness would merge with the parent company of Anytime Fitness, Self Esteem Brands, to form a fitness franchise chain that has more than 7,000 locations (over 1,500 from Orangetheory, 5,500 Self Esteem) with combined sales of $3.5 billion. The merger was completed in April 2024. The parent company formed by the merger was named Purpose Brands. Orangetheory retains its logo but adjusted its branding. Lauren Cody was appointed its president, while Dave Long became the co-chair of the Purpose Brands board.

== Overview ==
Orangetheory workouts are a form of high-intensity interval training, alternating between short periods of intense exercise and long recovery periods. These hour-long sessions are designed to generate excess post-exercise oxygen consumption (EPOC). Excess post-exercise oxygen consumption is a physiological concept that occurs after an elevation in oxygen consumption as the body returns to its pre-exercise state.

Studios are split into three stations: treadmill, water-resistant rowing machines, and weight training. Attendees cycle between these stations over the course of a session. Workouts are categorized as emphasizing endurance, power, or strength, or a combination of the three. Workout sessions are group exercises led by a coach. Classes are pre-designed and not divulged to attendees prior to arrival.

Members can book classes through the Orangetheory app which displays the location, day and time of open classes as well as which coach will be teaching. Members have the option to book classes at any OTF location around the world.

== Technology ==
Heart rate monitors are to be worn around the chest, forearm, or wrist. All metrics are shown on screens within the studio and for updated studios, they are shown on tablets attached to the treadmills or rowers.

There are five heart rate zones used in the Orangetheory workout; grey, blue, green, orange, and red.

1. The grey zone is 0–60 percent of an attendee's maximum heart-rate and is equivalent to an attendee's resting heart rate.
2. The blue zone is 61–70 percent of an attendee's maximum heart-rate. This is considered a warm-up period.
3. The green zone is 71–83 percent of an attendee's maximum heart-rate. This is considered an aerobic period of exercise.
4. The orange zone is 84–91 percent of an attendee's maximum heart-rate and when an attendee may reach EPOC.
5. The red zone is 92–100 percent of a participant's maximum heart-rate and represents a period of extreme physical exertion by an attendee.

Each attendee has the option to wear a branded heart rate monitor that is synchronized to a screen displaying performance metrics for the entire class. The workout tracks proprietary units called "splat points," which correspond to minutes spent in the orange and red heart rate zones. The recommended amount of splat points per class is 12 to 20, depending on your age, weight, and gender. Statistics are delivered to each member after each workout via email and a mobile app.

OTF recently partnered with InBody to give members the opportunity to see their body composition analysis through the InBody Test. The analysis measures body weight, metabolic rate, skeletal muscle mass, and body fat percentage.

== Social involvement ==
Orangetheory Fitness hosts several challenges throughout the year, including the Transformation Challenge, Dri-Tri, Marathon, All Out Mayhem, Hell Week, Orange Voyage, Catch Me If You Can, Inferno, Capture the Flag, and 12 Days of Fitness. The franchise holds annual events, such as 'Hell Week' and the 'Transformation Challenge,' which involve specific workout schedules.
