= Esporta Health Clubs =

British fitness club chain

Esporta Health & Fitness Clubs (usually known as just Esporta) was a chain of health clubs in the United Kingdom, which also once owned clubs in Spain. The clubs offered a wide variety of different fitness facilities, including gyms, swimming pools and courts for racquet sports. In addition they offered a choice of bar food and drinks, spa treatments and live sporting coverage.

On 26 April 2011, after two years of ownership, Société Générale confirmed that it had agreed to sell its Esporta health, fitness and racquets clubs to Virgin Active for £77.5m.

== History ==
After expanding quickly, in 2004 the firm announced their six Spanish clubs were up for sale. Selling all six in 2005, they sold seven UK locations to Virgin Active: Birmingham, Bolton, Crawley, Chelmsford, Gloucester, Medway, and Rugby. .

== Membership ==
Membership of the club allowed members to use other Esporta clubs for free except for certain 'Premium' clubs.

During 2009 Esporta changed this policy, adding a small one-off initial fee to use 'non-home' clubs. However, some clubs continued to offer free UK-wide usage for no extra fee.

== Controversy ==
The company was known for its stringent 12-month contracts and 3-month cancellation periods, which led to complaints in the media.
