= Mark Mastrov =

American businessman (born 1958)

- Born: January 29, 1958 (age 68); Oakland, California, U.S.
- Occupations: Businessman, executive
- Known for: 24 Hour Fitness

Mark S. Mastrov (born January 29, 1958) is an American businessman who is the co-founder and former CEO of 24 Hour Fitness. He is also part of the Sacramento Kings ownership group.

== Career ==
The 24 Hour Fitness began in 1983 as a one-club operation called 24 Hour Nautilus. Mark Mastrov and Leonard Schlemm began the firm, with Mastrov and Schlemm remaining to continue its expansion.

In 1998, David Giampaolo and Mark Mastrov co-founded Fitness Holdings Europe, a private-equity-backed investment vehicle, to open and acquire small chains of European health clubs. Fitness Holdings Europe was merged into 24 Hour Fitness Worldwide, Inc. in 2000. In 2010 Mastrov founded Hard Candy Fitness with Madonna and her manager Guy Oseary.

In 2013, Mastrov became a member of a new Sacramento Kings ownership group, which was led by Vivek Ranadivé.

In November 2015, he founded professional video gaming esports team NRG Esports with Gerard Kelly and Andy Miller.

== Personal life ==
Mastrov was born in 1958 in Oakland, California. He grew up in the San Francisco Bay Area and graduated from Castro Valley High School where he played point guard. He has a bachelor's degree in business from California State University, Hayward.

Mastrov's daughter, Mia Mastrov, played college basketball for the California Golden Bears.
