= Paul Toback =

American lawyer

Paul Toback is an Illinois attorney who was chief executive officer and chairman of the board of Bally Total Fitness Corporation from December 2002 until August 11, 2006, prior to the company's Chapter 11 bankruptcy filing in 2007. He received a lump sum payment for more than $3 million, and the vesting of 135,000 shares of restricted stock upon his resignation. Seven months before his resignation, Toback ceded effective control of the Bally board of directors to John Rogers, chief executive of Ariel Capital Management, who was named as "lead director." Prior to his resignation, Toback alleged that major Bally shareholder Emanuel Pearlman of Liberation Investments and former Bally CEO Lee Hillman were behind calls for his ouster, which Pearlman and Hillman denied.

According to Bally's 2003 Securities and Exchange Commission 10-K report, Toback was the director of administration for the then-mayor of Chicago, Richard M. Daley until 1993. After 1993, he became the executive assistant to the chief of staff Mack McLarty, under President Bill Clinton, for the next two years, where he worked on the North American Free Trade Agreement. From 1995 to mid-1997, he was also the COO of a private company, Globetrotter Engineering in Chicago. In 1997, he began to work at Bally.
