= GymNation =

Chain of fitness centers

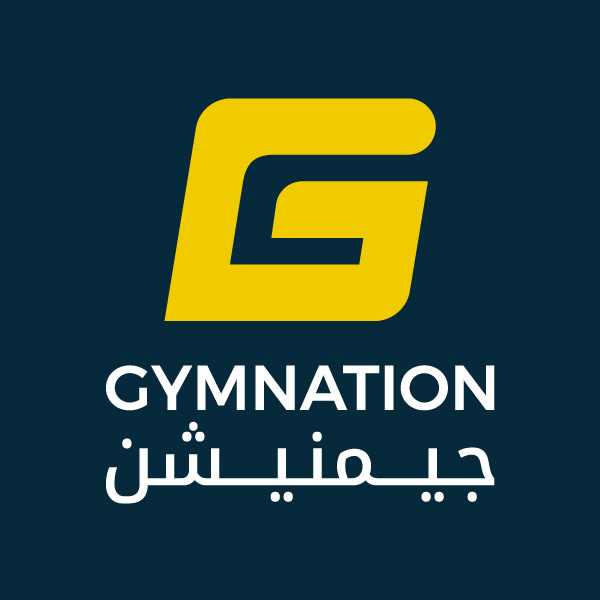
- Type: Private
- Industry: Fitness
- Founded: 2018
- Founders: Loren Holland; Frank Afeaki; Ant Martland
- Headquarters: Dubai, United Arab Emirates
- Number of locations: 34
- Area served: United Arab Emirates, Saudi Arabia, Bahrain
- Number of employees: 811 (2026)
- Website: www.gymnation.com

GymNation is a chain of fitness centers based in the United Arab Emirates, Saudi Arabia and Bahrain.

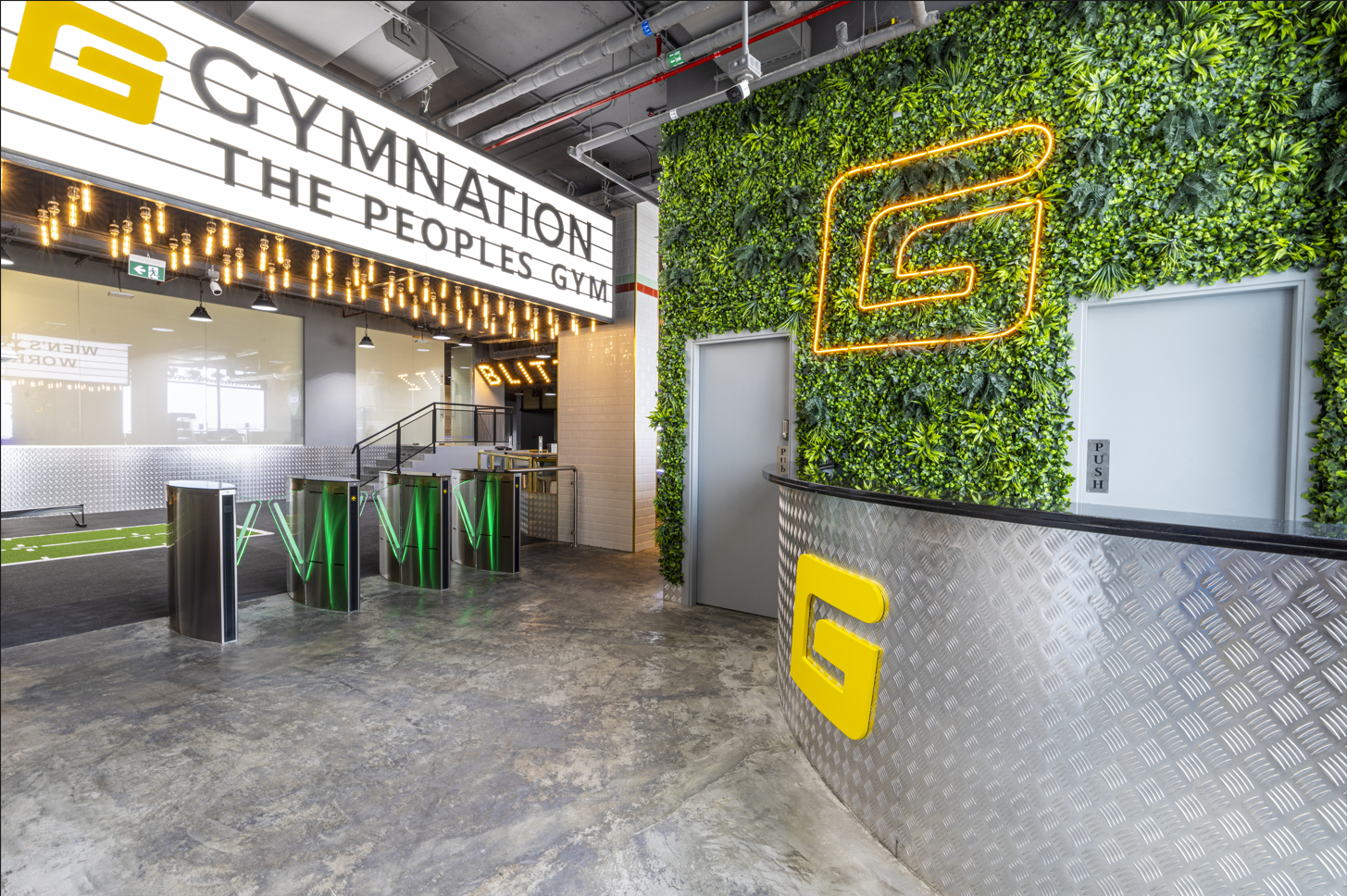
GymNation Downtown Dubai Entrance

== History ==
GymNation was established by Loren Holland, Frank Afeaki, and Ant Martland, with the first GymNation gym opening in June 2018 in Al Quoz, Dubai. By mid-2021, GymNation had become one of the largest chains of fitness centers in the United Arab Emirates. In May 2021, GymNation signed a contract with the United Arab Emirates Rugby Federation and became the sponsor of the United Arab Emirates National Rugby Union Team.

In August 2024, GymNation launched in Saudi Arabia, selling out its initial 12,000 memberships in less than 72 hours. In the same month, GymNation acquired its Motor City site in the Control Tower for AED 70 million.

In February 2022, JD Sports Gyms, part of the FTSE 100-listed group JD Sports, announced an investment into GymNation in its bid to expand within the Gulf Cooperation Council (GCC) region. In November 2023, GymNation announced a management buyout of all equity held by previous investor JD Sports. This deal, backed by Tricap Investments and Ruya Partners, made GymNation's founders and management team, Loren Holland, Frank Afeaki, and Anthony Martland, significant majority shareholders in the business.

In December 2025, GymNation expanded into the Kingdom of Bahrain with the opening of its first gym at Atrium Mall in Saar. Ahead of the official opening, the company reported selling more than 3,000 memberships within the first 24 hours of pre-launch sales. At the time of the Bahrain launch, GymNation operated a total of 34 gyms across the United Arab Emirates and Saudi Arabia and had reported serving more than 150,000 members.
