= LA Fitness =

Health club chain in the United States and Canada

Fitness International LLC

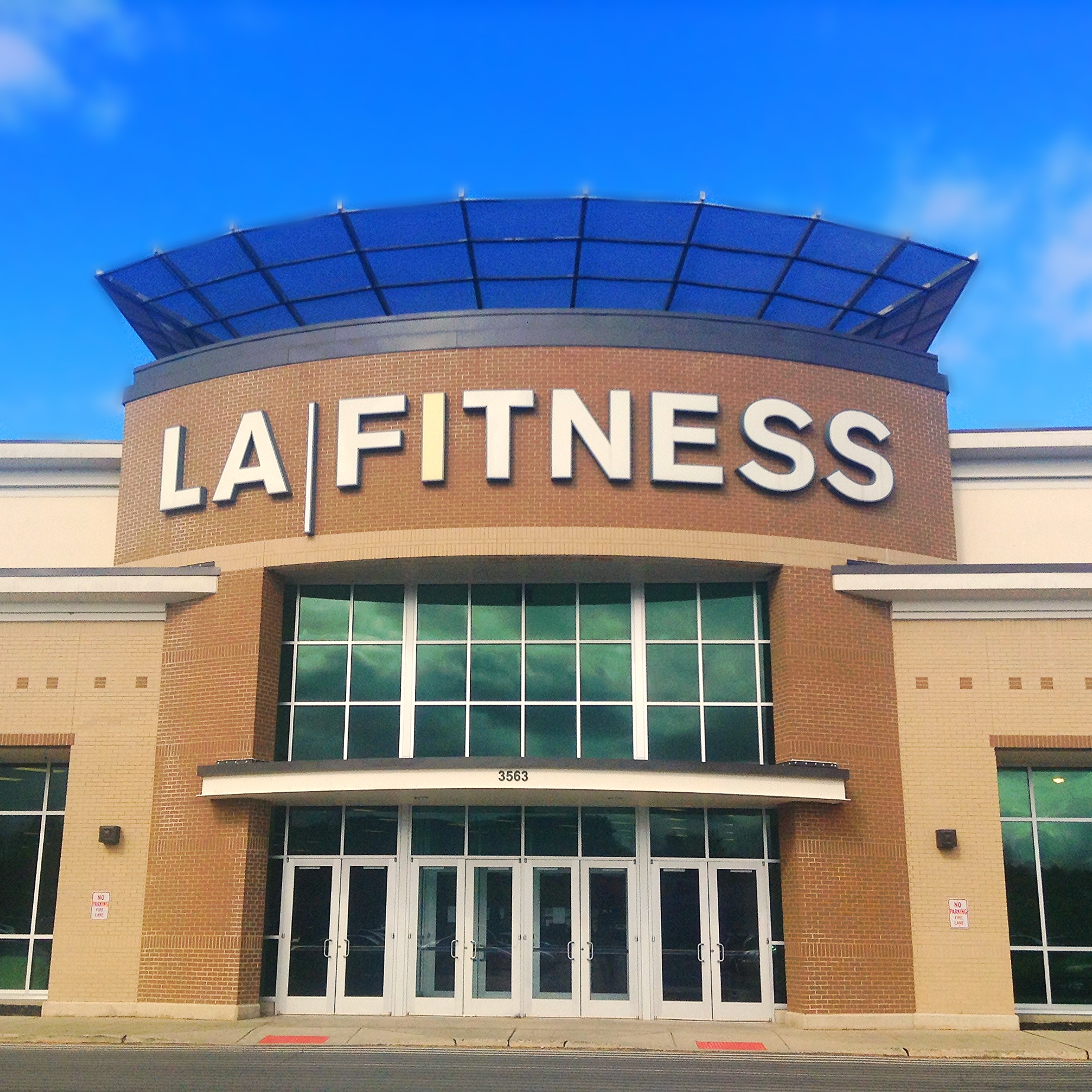
- Trade name: LA Fitness
- Type: Private
- Founded: November 1, 1984; 41 years ago Covina, California, U.S.
- Headquarters: Irvine, California
- Area served: United States, Canada
- Brands: LA Fitness; City Sports Club; Club Studio Fitness; Esporta Fitness (former)

Fitness International LLC is an American gym chain based in Irvine, California. The company was founded in 1984, with nearly 700 clubs across the United States and Canada.

== History ==
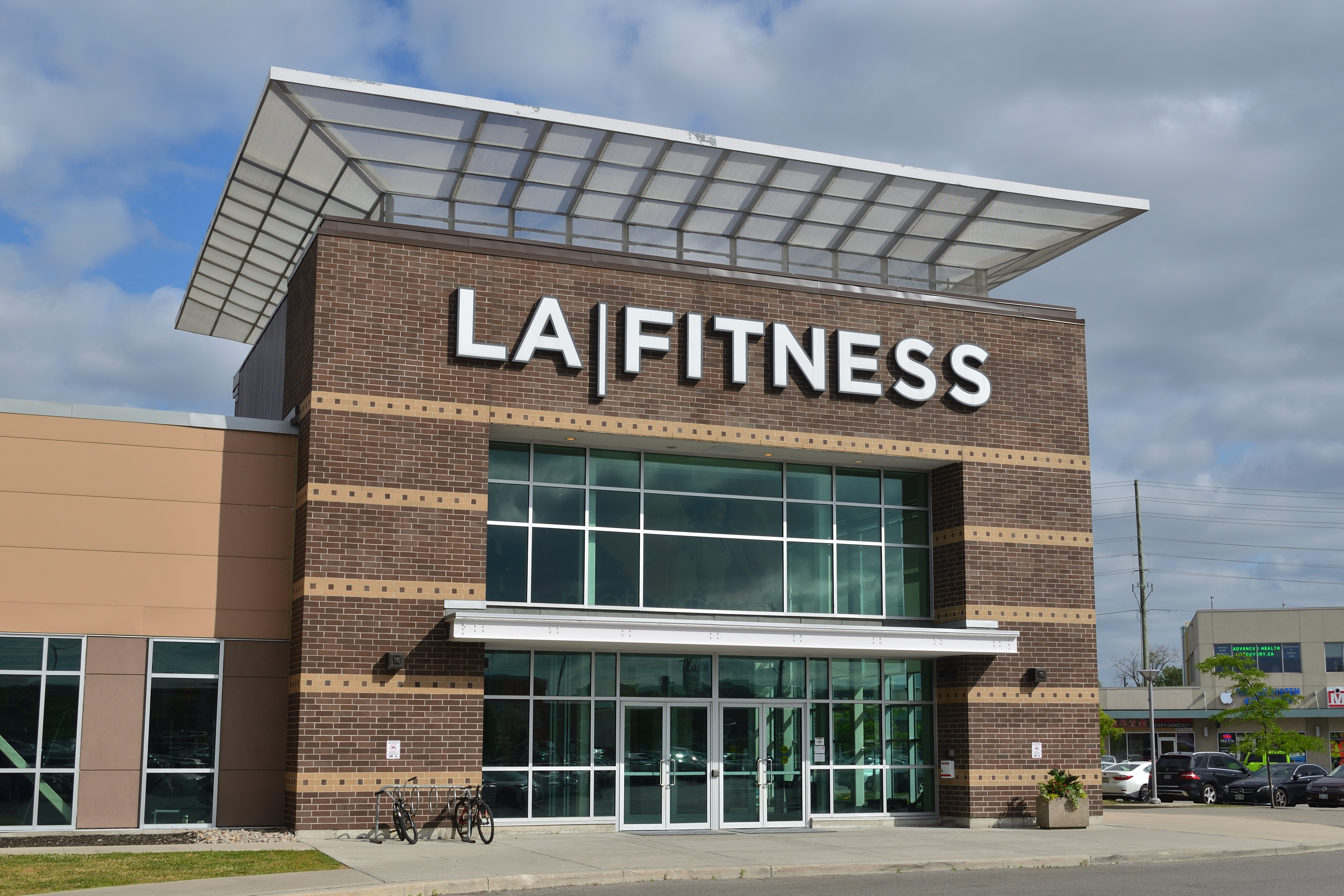
LA Fitness in Markham, Ontario

In 1984, Chinyol Yi and Louis Welch founded the first LA Fitness in Covina, California. The company expanded over the next 10 years by acquiring other gyms in Southern California. In 1995, it introduced a 45,000-square-foot club design. By 1998, LA Fitness operated 36 clubs in California, Arizona, and Florida. This new model cost $6 million to build and included full-court basketball, lap pools, racquetball, saunas, and steam rooms. The company received funding from Peter Seidler to continue expanding this new concept. Additional funding was later provided by CIVC Partners.

LA Fitness entered the Atlanta market in June 2000 by purchasing Australian Body Works, a 22-club chain, and converting all locations to the LA Fitness brand.

In 2007, the company expanded internationally by acquiring seven fitness clubs in Toronto, Ontario. The chain opened its first location in Wisconsin in March 2007. In May 2007, Madison Dearborn Partners acquired a 20 percent stake in LA Fitness for $600 million. By August 2008, the company had grown to more than 250 locations.

In 2010, the company acquired 11 Phoenix locations from Pure Fitness Arizona and closed one location in Tempe. By the end of that year, LA Fitness operated over 340 locations and generated $1 billion in revenue.

On November 30, 2011, the company acquired 171 clubs from Bally Total Fitness for $153M. LA Fitness took over operations for all clubs in Arizona, California, Florida, Georgia, Illinois, Indiana, Maryland, Michigan, Minnesota, Oregon, Pennsylvania, Washington, and the District of Columbia. Additional locations included Massachusetts, New Jersey, New York, and Virginia.

The company agreed to acquire all 33 Lifestyle Family Fitness Clubs in Florida in June 2012. The transaction was completed in July, and one location was closed. In October 2012, LA Fitness acquired 36 Urban Active clubs in multiple states. By the end of the year, the company operated 14 locations in Ontario.

In October 2012, Fitness International LLC launched its City Sports Club brand in Northern California, opening its first locations in San Jose by rebranding existing LA Fitness facilities. The company opened a Fremont location in April 2013 and later opened its first Sacramento location in 2021.

On December 23, 2013, LA Fitness announced the acquisition of the Buffalo and Rochester Athletic Clubs in Western New York. On December 30, it completed the acquisition of all 10 Vision Quest Sport and Fitness clubs in the Seattle metropolitan area. In November 2015, LA Fitness acquired all 24 Hour Fitness locations in Arizona. Three of them were later closed. At the end of that year, the company permanently closed its sole Wisconsin location after nine years of operation.

In January 2020, Fitness International LLC launched its Esporta Fitness brand by rebranding 17 LA Fitness locations within the Phoenix metropolitan area. The brand was introduced to compete with low-cost, high-volume gyms like Planet Fitness. By 2023, Fitness International had rebranded additional LA Fitness locations throughout the United States, operating over 100 locations under the Esporta Fitness name.

Co-founder, president, and co-CEO of Fitness International, Louis Welch, died in September 2023.

In July 2024, Fitness International announced the acquisition XSport Fitness. Its 35 locations in New York, Chicago, and Virginia were rebranded under the company's other brands.

In 2024, Fitness International LLC began winding down the Esporta Fitness brand. Most locations reverted to the LA Fitness name, while the other locations were permanently closed. Fitness International LLC discontinued the Esporta Fitness brand entirely in 2025. On February 27, 2025, the company sold eight Esporta Fitness locations in Arkansas, Kentucky, and Louisiana to Genesis Health Clubs. By April 1, 2025, the three remaining locations in California, Illinois, and Massachusetts were rebranded as LA Fitness.

In support of an executive order issued by U.S. President Donald Trump to re-establish the Presidential Fitness Test, Fitness International announced in August 2025 that it would offer high school students free after-school access to LA Fitness and City Sports Club locations.

== Legal issues ==
In 2015, a Muslim man sued LA Fitness after workers at a Cincinnati location told him he would be banned from the facility if he continued to pray in the locker room.

In 2018, two Black men were racially profiled and ordered to leave an LA Fitness location in New Jersey. Staff then called police on them twice while they were working out.

In 2024, Fitness International closed an Esporta Gym in Morgan Park, Chicago. Community members protested the closure for disproportionately impacting Black members in Chicago. Following the protests, Esporta was replaced by a new UFC boxing gym.

In October 2024, the Department of Justice sued LA Fitness for violating the Americans with Disabilities Act, alleging that the company discriminates against members with disabilities.

In August 2025, the Federal Trade Commission sued Fitness International LLC for unfair trade practices, alleging that the cancellation policies at its LA Fitness clubs made it exceedingly difficult for customers to cancel their memberships. The company disputed the allegations.

== Facilities ==
LA Fitness locations feature full-court basketball courts, lap pools, racquetball courts, saunas, and steam rooms, with clubs ranging from 20,000 to 60,000 square feet.

Beginning in 2022, Fitness International partnered with Xponential Fitness to add its brands, starting with Club Pilates and StretchLab, to LA Fitness and City Sports Club locations. The company also began offering access to the Les Mills+ fitness app for an additional fee.

In 2026, the company piloted a motion-tracking basketball court system from Shoot 360 that uses artificial intelligence to provide real-time analytics, virtual leaderboards, and training technology.

== Club Studio ==
In December 2022, Fitness International launched Club Studio, a premium gym brand that includes multiple boutique fitness programs in a single facility. Locations offer cycling, boxing, Pilates, yoga, and cardio training as well as free weights, strength and cardio areas, swimming pools, functional training areas, and basketball courts. Other amenities include cryotherapy, red light therapy, massage beds and rollers, compression and percussion therapy, babysitting services, a wellness cafe, and an athleisure retail store.

The first location was in Irvine, California. By October 2025, the company had expanded to 15 locations. By March 2026, the company was operating 18 Club Studio sites in California, Connecticut, Florida, Illinois, Michigan, New Jersey, New York, Texas, and Virginia.
