= Xponential Fitness =

American fitness franchise company

Xponential Fitness Inc
- Type: Public
- Traded as: NYSE: XPOF
- Industry: Fitness
- Founded: August 11, 2017; 9 years ago
- Headquarters: Irvine, California
- Key people: Mikey Nuzzo CEO
- Number of employees: 690 (2023)
- Subsidiaries: Club Pilates; StretchLAB; BFT; Pure Barre; YogaSix; Lindora
- Website: www.xponential.com

Xponential Fitness is an American franchisor of boutique fitness brands. Its franchises operate in 49 U.S. states and 31 countries with more than 3,000 studios open. The company is headquartered in Irvine, California.

== Overview ==
The company was founded by Anthony Geisler, who served as CEO until early 2025. Geisler had resigned following a suspension. Geisler was replaced by Mark King, who formerly served as Taco Bell CEO.

Xponential Fitness grew out of Club Pilates, which Anthony Geisler had acquired in 2015 before formally establishing Xponential Fitness LLC in August 2017 as a multi-brand boutique fitness franchisor.

Xponential owns and operates five subsidiary brands. These include Club Pilates, StretchLab, YogaSix, Pure Barre, and BFT. Pure Barre was purchased by Xponential in 2018. The company had planned an initial public offering for 2020, but the COVID-19 pandemic delayed it. Xponential listed on the New York Stock Exchange on July 23, 2021. It offered 10 million shares at $12 each, down from an original plan of 13.3 million shares at $14 to $16. Xponential sold off four subsidiary brands to Extraordinary Brands: Row House in 2024, CycleBar in 2025, Rumble in 2025, and Lindora in 2025.

In March 2025, Xponential Fitness posted a net loss of US$98.7 million for the full year and restated its 2023 financial position. In its 2026 annual report, the company reported a continued net loss of US$53.7 million for 2025. This was against a profit of US$37.5 million in 2023.
