= Virgin Active =

International health club chain

Virgin Active Limited
- Type: Joint venture
- Industry: Health club, gym
- Founded: 1998; 28 years ago, in Preston, Lancashire, United Kingdom
- Founder: Richard Branson, Matthew Bucknall
- Headquarters: London, England
- Number of locations: 226; 32 (UK); 136 (South Africa); 33 (Italy); 11 (Australia); 6 (Singapore); 8 (Thailand); 2 (Namibia); 1 (Botswana)
- Area served: South Africa, Namibia, Botswana, Italy, Australia, UK, Singapore, Thailand
- Key people: Sir Richard Branson; Matthew Bucknall (CEO of Virgin Active Group)
- Owner: Christo Wiese (80%); Virgin Group (20%)
- Website: www.virginactive.com

Virgin Active Limited is a chain of health clubs in South Africa, Namibia, Botswana, Italy, Australia, Singapore, Thailand and the United Kingdom.

== History ==
Virgin Active was founded in 1999. Their first club opened in Preston, Lancashire that year. Initially headquartered in Milton Keynes, in 2013 headquarters were moved to London, leaving a small call centre in Milton Keynes which closed in 2018.

In South Africa the company bought the assets of the 'Health and Racquet Club' chain after the latter's parent company, Leisurenet, had been placed in liquidation in October 2000 for 319.6 million South African Rand (approximately £24.5m as at November 2011). The South African company also runs Virgin Life Care.

In 2002, by which point the company had 350,000 members, Branson sold 55 percent of the company to Bridgepoint Capital for £40 million. In 2005, Branson bought out Bridgepoint's stake in the business for £134.5 million.

It subsequently expanded its operations in 2004 to Italy. By 2005 the company had 25 clubs in the UK, 77 clubs in South Africa and 12 clubs in Continental Europe. It opened its first Australian club in Sydney in late 2008, with further clubs launched in Singapore and Thailand in 2014.

On 1 November 2006 it took over the UK-based operation of the more prestigious Holmes Place chain, thus increasing its UK chain of clubs from 24 to 72 overnight. On 26 April 2011 it announced the takeover of UK gym operator Esporta's 55 clubs increasing the UK business to 124 clubs.

In 2013, Virgin Active expanded into the South East Asian market, first opening a club in Singapore at the heart of the CBD. Located on Level 6, Tower 2, One Raffles Place. Playing a significant role in opening the first club in South East Asia was Christian Mason, the newly appointed 'Managing Director South East Asia'. Virgin Active then went on to open 14 more clubs in both Singapore and Thailand.

In 2014 Virgin Active launched a new low-cost gym called Virgin Active RED. The RED gyms focuses on first timers who may be intimidated by training by strategically placing exercise equipment in different stages around the gym and further having touch screen computers and other technologies placed in these predefined area's teaching the user how to do the exercise correctly.

On 16 April 2015, it was reported that Virgin Group and their private equity backers had sold 80% of Virgin Active to the South African investment firm Brait, owned by the billionaire Christo Wiese. The sale price was £682 million for an 80% stake, valuing the business at £1.3 billion, including debt, and the transaction was completed in July 2015. The company will continue to operate under the Virgin Active brand.

In December 2015, the South African Competition Tribunal announced that it was investigating Virgin Active's South African operations and the Discovery Group for contravening the Competition Act.

In 2016, 35 clubs were sold to Nuffield Health, then in 2017, 15 clubs were sold to David Lloyd Leisure.

Facing the impacts of Covid-19 and the closure of clubs in all territories during the government mandated lockdowns, in 2020 Virgin Active's revenue dropped to £224.7 million. The company began working with Allen & Overy as legal counsel and Deloitte as restructuring advisors, plus their lenders began working with Hogan Lovells and Alvarez & Marsal to help them through the restructuring process.

Following further closures as of September 2023 the number of Virgin Active gyms in the UK dropped to 32, with 23 of these inside the M25. The nine Virgin Active gyms outside London are Salford Quays, Sheffield, Nottingham, Solihull, Northampton (2), Chelmsford, Hadleigh and Brentwood.

Virgin Active has had the following Chief Executive Officers (CEOs) since its inception:

1. Matthew Bucknall (1999–2013): Co-founder Matthew Bucknall was CEO from the opening of the first club in Preston, UK, in 1999 until 2013.
2. Paul Woolf (2013–2022): Paul Woolf succeeded Bucknall as CEO in 2013.
3. Dean Kowarski (2022–present): Appointed in March 2022, Dean Kowarski, founder of The Real Foods Group, became the Group CEO.

In August 2025, following a legal threat from GB News host Michelle Dewberry and supported by gender-critical group Sex Matters, Virgin Active instituted a ban on trans women from female changing rooms within the United Kingdom.

== Accidents and deaths ==
In March 2003, 32 year old City banker Katarzyna Woja stepped out of the lift at the Virgin Active (then Holmes Place) Broadgate Health Club in central London, when its cable snapped and the hydraulic cabin plunged downwards. Woja became trapped between the cabin's mantel and the lift shaft and was dragged downwards, suffering disastrous injuries. She died soon after. Although she was with seven other people in the lift, she was the only one injured in the accident, as she was the last one to step out of the lift. Following a lengthy investigation by health and safety experts Holmes Place (bought by Virgin Active) was charged with six breaches of the Health and Safety at Work Act while the lift manufacturer ThyssenKrupp was charged with four breaches.

In December 2011, Virgin's flagship club in High Street Kensington was accused of covering up the death of model and city worker Elsa Carneau, who drowned in the swimming pool at the west London club. A fire crew and paramedics tried to revive the Imperial College graduate for almost an hour before she was taken to Chelsea and Westminster Hospital, where she was pronounced dead. Westminster coroner's court heard that staff at the club administered CPR incorrectly and falsified paperwork relating to CCTV checks to pretend that they had been monitoring the pool in a “distasteful” attempt to cover their tracks. Firemen also described how a man, who said he was a member of staff, had stood by filming efforts to resuscitate Carneau on his mobile telephone. Pierre Carneau, the victim's father criticised Virgin Active for not apologising for the accident. He stated "It was an accident waiting to happen. If things had been done properly, I think there’s a chance our daughter may still be alive.” Virgin Active admitted health and safety breaches and was fined £100,000 at Southwark Crown Court in December 2013. An investigation found “serious shortcomings in the management of risks connected with swimming activity at the club” going back to 2009.

In April 2014, three gym goers were injured when a suspended ceiling collapsed on to a line of rowing machines at the Virgin Active on Chiswick High Road, in West London.

In November 2024, a 34-year-old doctor was fatally shot in the parking lot of Virgin Active Riverside in Mbombela, South Africa, by unknown assailants. The motive and suspects were unknown at the time of reporting.

== Legal issues ==
=== Legal issues and controversy in Italy ===
==== Unauthorised construction ====
In October 2020, the Virgin Active gymnasium in Palermo, Sicily, was subject to judicial seizure for building abuse involving an increase in the useful surface area of the building and a different outline of the same, with non-payment of 60,000 Euros corresponding to urbanisation charges. The Virgin Group company pleaded ignorance of the facts as it had a lease agreement with the company that owned the building, Euroleasing Company Spa; Virgin Group terminated the lease in January 2022.

==== Unfair business practices fine ====
On June 18, 2025, the Italian Competition and Market Authority (AGICOM) fined the company €3 million euros for unfair business practices in Italy regarding the terms of subscriptions, cancellation and early termination of the contracts. The authority indicated that the company had failed to provide information on the price increases practiced in the year 2024 and that it had complicated the contract termination methodology between the company and the customer.
