= Celebrity Fitness =

Fitness center operator

Celebrity Fitness (CF)
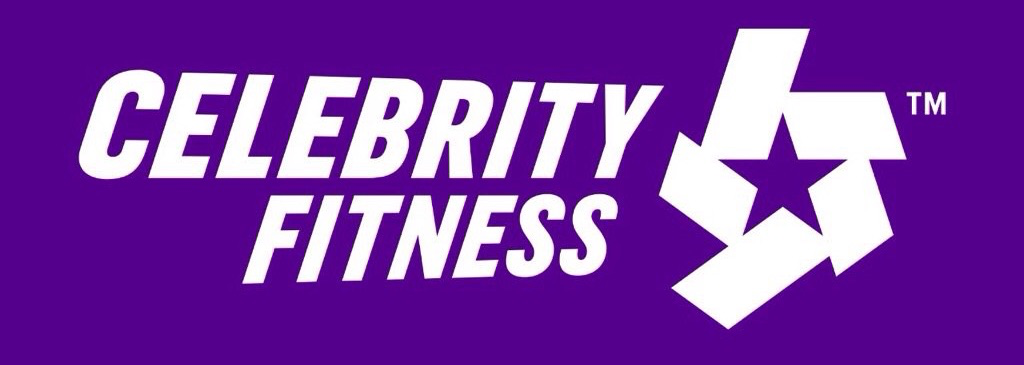
- Company type: Private
- Industry: Health and Fitness
- Genre: Fitness
- Founded: Jakarta, Indonesia (2003)
- Founder: John Franklin, Mike Duane Anderson, John Joseph Sweeney
- Headquarters: Jakarta, Indonesia
- Number of locations: Indonesia 76 clubs; Malaysia 24 clubs; Philippines 2 clubs; India 2 clubs; Thailand 2 clubs
- Key people: Simon Flint (CEO, Evolution Wellness) Rajat Singh  (CEO-India)
- Number of employees: ≈2,400
- Parent: Evolution Wellness (Oaktree Capital Management (50%) and Navis Capital Partners (50%)) - for Celebrity Fitness Indonesia and Malaysia
- Website: www.celebrityfitness.com
- Footnotes / references Celebrity Fitness in Indonesia, Malaysia, the Philippines and India, are separate entities with different shareholders, and managed by different leadership teams.

Celebrity Fitness is a fitness center operator with a network of clubs across Indonesia, Malaysia, the Philippines, and India.

== Background ==
Celebrity Fitness was founded in 2003 by John Franklin, Mike Anderson, and JJ Sweeney. Celebrity Fitness commenced operations in February 2004 in Jakarta.

In 2005, Celebrity Fitness entered the Malaysian market with its first club in Kuala Lumpur. This is located at 1 Utama Shopping Centre in Petaling Jaya, Selangor, Malaysia. The Malaysian business expanded in 2009 with the purchase of California Fitness (Malaysia) gyms.

In 2007, the majority shareholding of Celebrity Fitness was acquired by Navis Capital Partners.

In 2012, Celebrity Fitness entered the Singaporean market.

In 2017, Fitness First Asia merged with Celebrity Fitness to create Evolution Wellness Holdings Pte. Ltd., equally co-owned by Oaktree Capital Management and Navis Capital Partners. However, both brands will remain separate.
