= Anytime Fitness =

American multinational fitness center chain

Anytime Fitness Franchisor, LLC

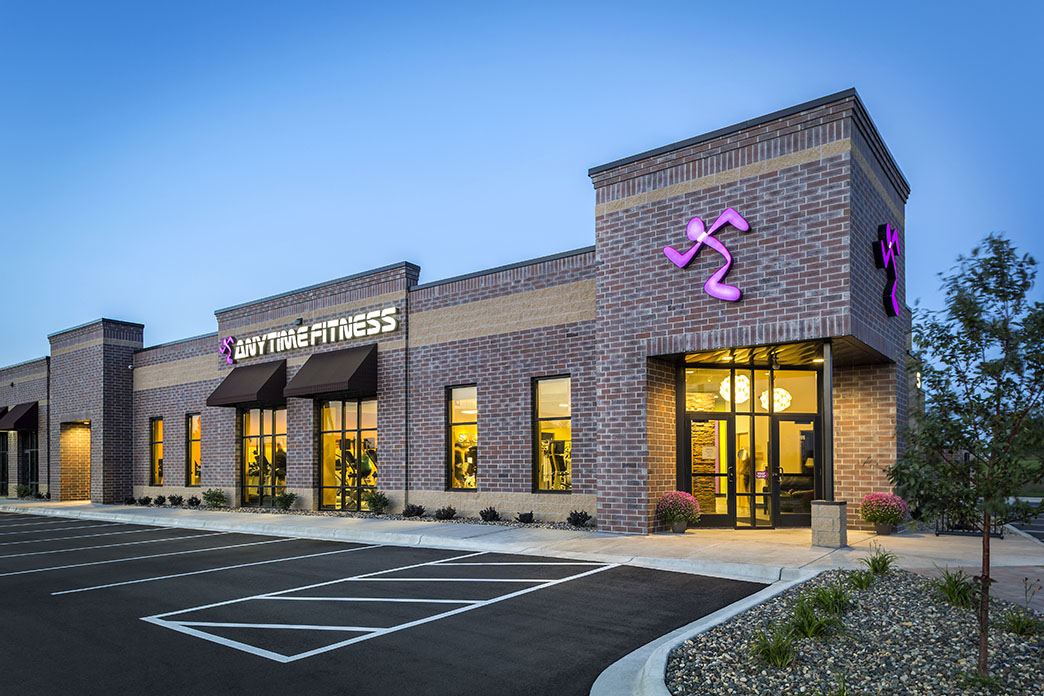
- Exterior view of an Anytime Fitness in Rosemount, Minnesota.
- Trade name: Anytime Fitness
- Type: Subsidiary
- Genre: Fitness
- Founded: 2002; 24 years ago
- Founders: Chuck Runyon; Dave Mortensen; Jeff Klinger
- Headquarters: Woodbury, Minnesota, United States
- Number of locations: 5,196 (2023)
- Revenue: US$1.45 billion
- Parent: Self Esteem Brands, LLC
- Website: anytimefitness.com

Anytime Fitness Franchisor, LLC, doing business as Anytime Fitness, is an American franchise of 24 hour health and fitness clubs that is based in Woodbury, Minnesota, United States. The company operates over 5,000 franchised locations in 50 countries. In 2014, Anytime Fitness was named the top franchise of 2014 by Entrepreneur magazine.

The parent company of Anytime Fitness merged with Orangetheory Fitness in 2024.

== History ==
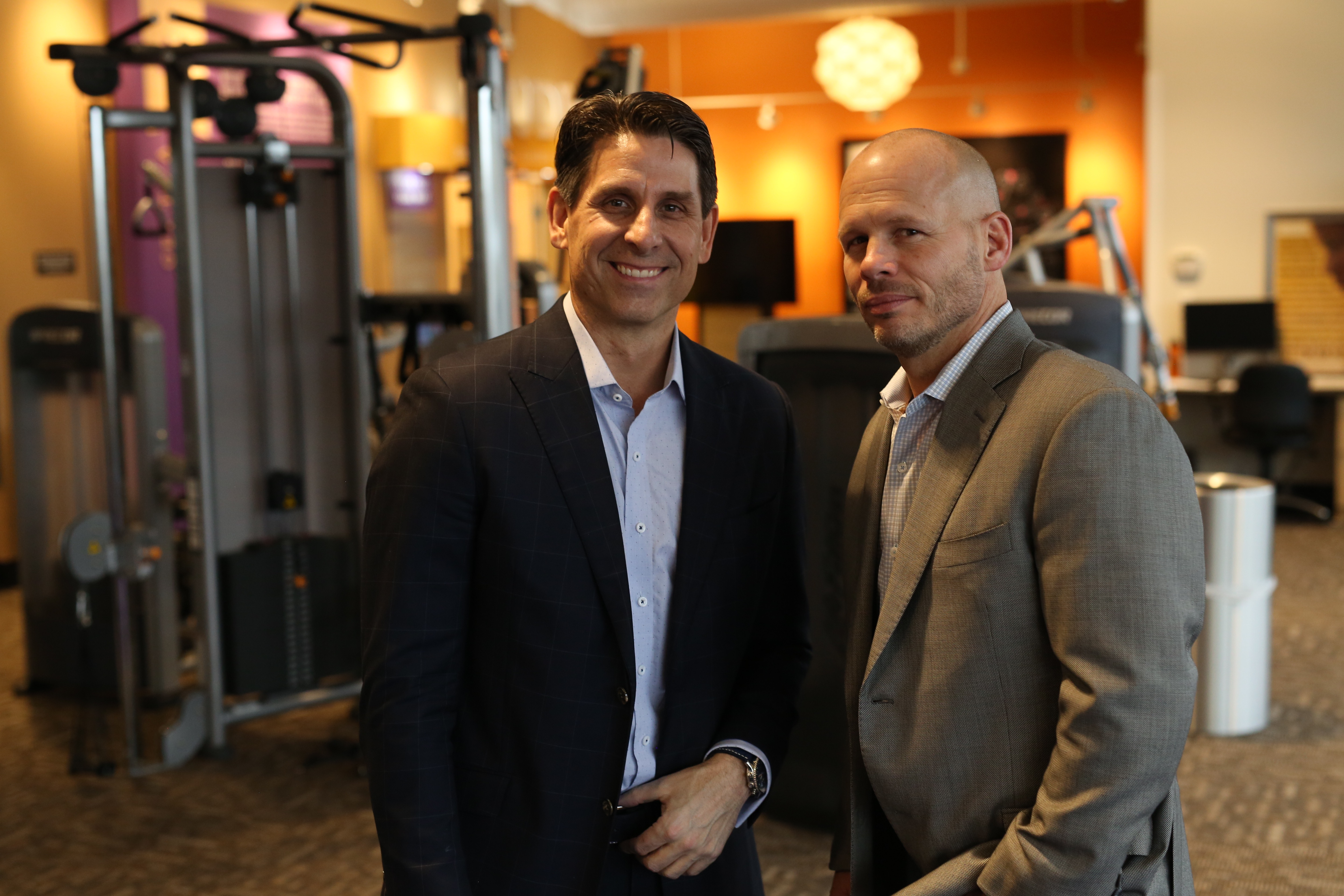
Anytime Fitness co-founders Chuck Runyon and Dave Mortensen

The founders, Chuck Runyon, Dave Mortensen, and Jeff Klinger initially met in the early 1990s while employed at a fitness club in St. Paul, Minnesota. Their collaboration began in 1995 when they jointly acquired and operated the Southview Athletic Club for seven years. Under their ownership, the club grew in membership, growing from 500 to 4,000 members. It was sold in 2001. During their ownership of Southview Athletic Club, they developed the idea for Anytime Fitness after surveying the expectations that long-term members of large gyms had for their fitness clubs.

Runyon, Mortensen, and Klinger founded Anytime Fitness in 2002. Eric Keller, a former employee of Southview Athletic Club, was interested in their business concept and agreed to become the first franchise owner of Anytime Fitness.

The debut franchise location opened its doors in Cambridge, Minnesota, later that year. The selection of this site was influenced by the absence of competing fitness clubs in a sufficiently large population. Soon after, two more locations were opened by former Southview Athletic Club employees in Duluth and Albert Lea, Minnesota. Runyon, Mortensen and Klinger sold 29 franchises before they opened a corporate-owned location in Bemidji, Minnesota.

=== Growth and international expansion ===
In February 2005, Anytime Fitness opened its first club outside of the United States in Halifax, Nova Scotia, Canada. By 2008, the company had almost 700 franchisees in 45 U.S. states and Canada, including 12 locations that they wholly owned themselves. In January 2009, they opened their 1,000th club in Wake Village, Texas. By October 2009, the company had more than 1,200 clubs with around 800,000 members.

In December 2009, Jeff Klinger, who had been the company's CEO since inception, sold his shares in Anytime Fitness and stepped down from his role as CEO. Chuck Runyon took over the role as CEO upon his departure.

In 2010, the company announced plans to open clubs in Japan, Belgium, the Netherlands, Luxembourg, the United Kingdom, and Ireland. By 2010, it had already expanded into Mexico and India.

In 2011, Anytime Fitness expanded into Qatar, Poland and the Netherlands. By 2012, the franchise had opened locations in Australia, Canada, Grand Cayman, Japan, Mexico, the Netherlands, Poland, New Zealand, Qatar, and the United Kingdom.

In 2012, Runyon and Mortensen formed Self Esteem Brands as an umbrella organization that included Anytime Fitness to expand into other personal care brands. Waxing The City, a small chain of waxing and hair removal salons, was the first to be bought by the new group in November 2012. Runyon and Mortensen converted Waxing The City into a franchise model similar to Anytime Fitness. Other brands that joined the group included Basecamp Fitness in 2018, The Bar Method in 2019, and Stronger U Nutrition in 2021.

In December 2013, Anytime Fitness purchased a 38-acre site in Woodbury, Minnesota, to build new company headquarters. Roark Capital Group acquired a large minority share in Anytime Fitness in March 2014. Erik Morris and Steve Romaniello, two directors from Roark, joined the board at Anytime Fitness after the acquisition. Mortensen and Runyon remained the company's primary holders and continued to run the business.

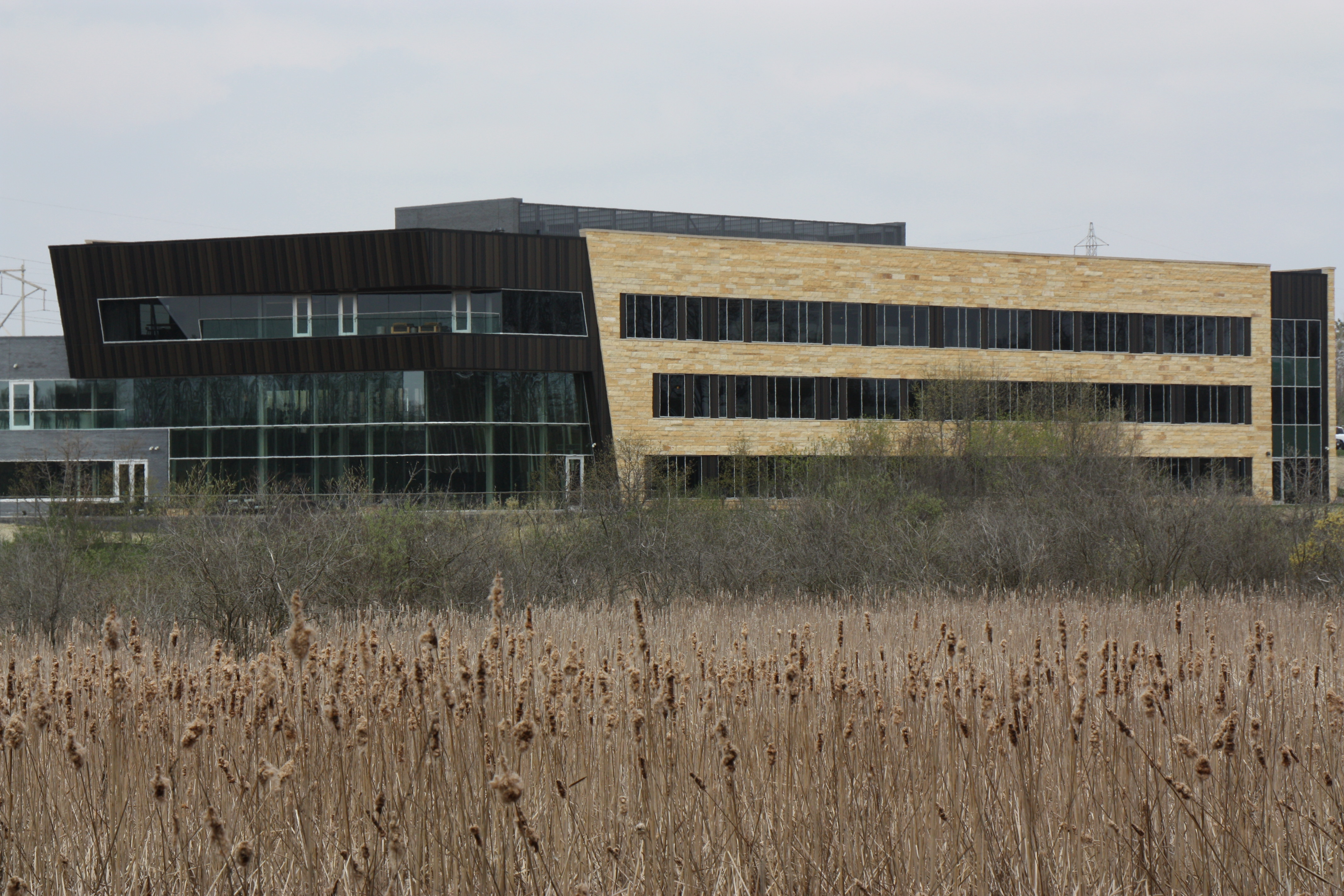
Exterior view of Anytime Fitness headquarters in Woodbury, Minnesota. Image taken in 2016.

On October 12, 2015, Anytime Fitness opened its 3,000th club, in Stroud, Gloucestershire, England.

The company moved its headquarters from Hastings to Woodbury, Minnesota, in April 2016. The new location contained 80,000 square feet of office space with a tattoo parlor and running trail.

In June 2017, Anytime Fitness became the first U.S.-based fitness chain to be granted a franchising license in China. The company entered into a master franchise agreement with Maurice Levine, who had previously opened franchise locations in Singapore, Malaysia, and the Philippines.

In 2019 the Anytime Fitness franchise started to provide passengers on the cruise ship Magellan Explorer with a gym to exercise traveling to and from Antarctica.

In 2018, Anytime Fitness had over 4,200 gym locations and 3 million clients in more than 32 countries. The number of gyms increased to over 5,200 by 2023.

In late February 2024, it was announced that the parent company of Anytime Fitness, Self Esteem Brands, would be merging with Orangetheory Fitness to form a fitness franchise chain that has more than 7,000 locations (over 1,500 from Orangetheory, 5,500 Self Esteem Brands mostly consisting of Anytime gyms) with combined sales of $3.5 billion. The merger was completed in April 2024. The parent company formed by the merger was named Purpose Brands.

== Operations and amenities ==
Each location is open 24 hours a day, 365 days out of the year. Rates are dependent on the prices set by the member's "home club," but they are allowed access to other Anytime Fitness locations. In 2016, the company had 188 employees.

Members and employees have a history of getting the logo tattoo, with an estimated 4,000 individuals inking their bodies, including CEO Chuck Runyon. Anytime Fitness provides a tattoo artist at its monthly training events and covers all expenses.

Anytime fitness typically includes a full range of gym equipment for the major muscle groups of the body. Machines for the upper body and legs populate the main area, while dumbbells and barbells are situated in the back of each location. Cardiovascular machines, such as treadmills are placed near the middle, while functional training machines are placed against the wall.

== Awards ==
In 2010, the International Health, Racquet, and Sports Club Association named Anytime Fitness the fastest-growing fitness club. In 2014, Entrepreneur magazine ranked Anytime Fitness number one on their franchise 500 list. In 2015 and 2016, Anytime Fitness was ranked first on the publication's top global franchises list.
