= 24 Hour Fitness =

Fitness center chain

- Type: Private
- Genre: Fitness
- Founded: 1983; 43 years ago
- Founder: Mark S. Mastrov
- Headquarters: Carlsbad, California, United States
- Number of locations: 244
- Area served: 9 U.S. states
- Key people: Karl Sanft (CEO)
- Owner: Sculptor Capital Investments LLC; Monarch Alternative Capital LP; Cyrus Capital Partners LP
- Number of employees: 7,500+
- Website: 24hourfitness.com

24 Hour Fitness is a privately held and operated fitness center chain headquartered in Carlsbad, California. It is the second largest fitness chain in the United States based on revenue after LA Fitness, and the fourth in number of clubs (behind LA Fitness, Anytime Fitness, and Gold's Gym), operating 244 clubs across nine U.S. states. The company was originally founded by Mark S. Mastrov and was sold to Forstmann Little & Co in 2005, and then to AEA investors and Ontario Teachers Pension Plan in 2014.

After the COVID-19 pandemic forced gym closures and ravaged the fitness industry in 2020, the company filed for bankruptcy in June 2020, closed over 130 clubs, and successfully emerged from bankruptcy under new owners Sculptor Capital Investments LLC, Monarch Alternative Capital LP and Cyrus Capital Partners LP in December, 2020.

== History ==
=== Early history and founding ===
24 Hour Fitness was founded initially as 24 Hour Nautilus in 1983, in San Leandro, CA by Mark Mastrov. With the merger of the #2 and #3 largest fitness chains in the United States. Mastrov had been using a local gym for rehab after a knee injury, and turned the gym into a 24-hour Nautilus facility after buying out the owner. The company was originally named "24 Hour Nautilus", but in 1996 it merged with Carlsbad, California-based company "Family Fitness" (founded by Ray Wilson in 1977) which resulted in both brands emerging as "24 Hour Fitness"

=== 2004–2008: Olympics and other sponsorships ===
In 2004, 24 Hour Fitness became a sponsor of the 2004–2008 United States Olympic teams. The sponsorship grants memberships to some U.S. Olympic hopefuls, and includes upgrades to some U.S. Olympic Training Centers across the country, including renovation of the facility in Colorado Springs, Colorado, in 2004 to be followed by Lake Placid, New York, and Chula Vista, California.

24 Hour Fitness partnered with NBC to develop a reality show, The Biggest Loser, which features 12 to 22 overweight contestants competing to lose weight over several million dollars. The show first aired in late 2004.

Beginning in 2005, 24 Hour Fitness partnered with cyclist Lance Armstrong co-sponsored the Discovery Channel Pro Cycling Team. That same year, 24 Hour Fitness opened its first Lance Armstrong Signature Club. 24 Hour Fitness cut their ties with Armstrong in 2012 after his doping scandal.

=== 2009–2020: Acquisition and Coronavirus ===
24 Hour Fitness formerly had some 15 clubs in Singapore and China. Besides the United States, it had centers in Singapore and Hong Kong, Beijing and Shanghai in China) through its wholly owned subsidiary California Fitness (CalFit). Its European clubs closed in the early 2000s. CalFit was sold to Ansa Group, a Hong Kong company in 2012; 24 Hour Fitness became an exclusively US gym chain.

Its former affiliate and spinoff California Wow Xperience (CalWowX), a California Fitness offshoot, formerly had member swap agreements with both 24 Hour, then only California Fitness, and at its height ran gyms located in Bangkok, Chiang Mai and Pattaya in Thailand, including one female-only club.

In August 2012, the owner of 24 Hour Fitness put the 416 location gym chain on the auction block with a price tag reported to have been close to $2 billion. After being courted by various interests for over six months, ultimately in January 2012, the board of directors took 24 Hour Fitness off the market. Offers reportedly fell short of the asking price.

In May 2014, Forstmann Little & Co. reportedly sold 24 Hour Fitness Worldwide Inc. for $1.85 billion to an investment group led by AEA Investors LP and the Ontario Teachers' Pension Plan.

In April 2020, due to the coronavirus gym closings, the company was exploring the option of filing for bankruptcy within the next few months. In June 2020, the company officially declared bankruptcy and indicated plans to close over 130 gyms. In December 2020, the company successfully emerged from bankruptcy.

=== 2021-present: Emergence from bankruptcy and re-investment ===
In December 2020, 24 Hour Fitness exited Chapter 11 bankruptcy after the U.S. Bankruptcy Court for the District of Delaware confirmed its reorganization plan. The restructuring eliminated roughly US$1.2 billion in debt and transferred ownership to a group of lenders including Sculptor Capital, Monarch Alternative Capital, and Cyrus Capital Partners.

Following emergence, the company began a multiyear effort to rebuild its membership base and modernize its club portfolio. These initiatives have included equipment and facility upgrades at over 30 locations, expanded recovery services through their Recovery24 amenities, and a streamlining of the operating footprint through selective club closures.

In 2025, 24 Hour Fitness secured a US$305 million senior-secured credit facility to refinance near-term maturities and fund capital improvements.

The company has stated that future priorities include continued investment in facility upgrades, expansion of wellness and recovery amenities, and further optimization of its club network. In November 2025, 24 Hour Fitness launched Reformer24 Pilates, a pilot program introduced in Southern California, offering studio-style reformer Pilates through a hybrid model that combines video-led classes with in-club equipment access.

== Operations ==
As of October 2025, 24 Hour Fitness operates 244 clubs in nine states: California, Colorado, Hawaii, New Jersey, New York, Nevada, Oregon, Texas, and Washington, with more than 7,500 employees. Its major competitors in the US are Anytime Fitness, Gold's Gym and LA Fitness.

On February 3, 2025, Onelife Fitness announced the acquisition of two Virginia 24 Hour Fitness clubs, located in Fairfax and Falls Church.

On April 15, 2025, Crunch Fitness announced the acquisition of nine Florida 24 Hour Fitness clubs, located in Apopka, Doral, Homestead, Kirkman, Lake Mary, Miami Gardens, Orlando Park, Plantation, and Winter Park.

== Partnerships ==
Since emerging from bankruptcy, 24 Hour Fitness has established multiple partnerships across professional sports and community organizations. In 2023, the company partnered with Playworks, a national nonprofit focused on active play in schools, to support children’s physical activity and social-emotional development. In 2024, the company also partnered with Boardroom, the sports and entertainment media brand founded by Kevin Durant and Rich Kleiman, to create athlete-led activations, community events, and branded content across its club network.

The brand has also formed partnerships with several professional sports teams, including the Los Angeles Rams, the LA Clippers, and San Diego Wave FC, a National Women's Soccer League club.

== Criticisms ==
On July 31, 2007, 24 Hour Fitness settled a class-action lawsuit brought against it by 1.8 million current and former members. The plaintiffs claimed damages for the continuation of automatic withdrawals by 24 Hour Fitness long after their monthly memberships were canceled by request. In McCardle vs 24 Hour Fitness USA, Inc., the Alameda County Court ruled in favor of the plaintiffs of the class-action lawsuit. In 2010, the court found that 24 Hour Fitness did not act in good faith after denying members who purchased an "All Club" membership access to rebranded locations without charging additional fees not disclosed in the original contract.

Six former employees of 24 Hour Fitness filed a separate class-action lawsuit on July 13, 2010. This lawsuit was brought in the State of California pursuant to allegations that 24 Hour Fitness discriminated based on race and gender in their promotion practices. The claimants are either females, minorities, or both.

== Ratings and reviews ==
As of May 31, 2024, 650 complaints had been registered against 24 Hour Fitness with the Better Business Bureau (BBB) in the previous three years, 291 in the previous 12 months. As of November 12, 2025, 24 Hour Fitness has a "NR" rating with the BBB.
