= Ken Sprague =

American film producer

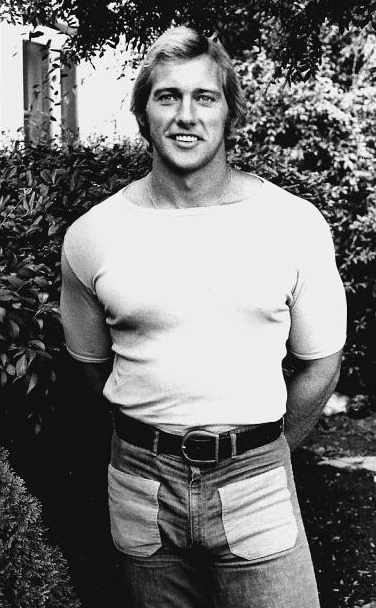
- Sprague, 1970
- Born: July 14, 1945 (age 81); Cincinnati, Ohio, U.S.
- Other name: Dakota
- Education: University of Cincinnati
- Occupations: Bodybuilder; businessman; author; teacher; model; pornographic actor
- Years active: 1969–2010
- Height: 6 ft 2 in (1.88 m)
- Spouses: Melrose Thrower (m. 1964; div. 1969) Maryon Riesenfeld (m. 1971; died 1978) Donna Wong (m. 1978)
- Children: 3

Kenneth Ray Sprague (born July 14, 1945) is an American bodybuilder, businessman, author and school teacher. He is best known as the owner of the original Gold's Gym in Venice, Los Angeles, which he purchased and managed between the years 1972 and 1979.

Born in Cincinnati, Ohio, Sprague had a passion for sports since childhood. While still in school, he actively pursued track and field, football, boxing, Olympic weightlifting, and bodybuilding. He competed in numerous Amateur Athletic Union (AAU) championships and won the Mr. Cincinnati bodybuilding title in 1967. After enrolling at the University of Cincinnati, Sprague was encouraged by a friend to try modeling, which led him to COLT male erotica studio in New York City. At first, he posed nude for several gay publications, but soon he was asked to travel to California where he starred in a handful of hardcore gay porn clips under the name Dakota. His instant popularity in the porn industry brought him enough money and contacts to establish his own independent film studio and purchase the Gold's Gym in 1972.

After the modest beginnings following his purchase of the then declining fitness club, Sprague managed to make Gold's a household name. Sponsoring bodybuilding competitions such as AAU Mr. America, it caught the attention of press and was soon dubbed "the Mecca of bodybuilding". It was frequented by Arnold Schwarzenegger and Dave Draper, and featured in the 1974 book Pumping Iron and its 1977 film adaptation. Sprague sold Gold's in 1979 and later moved to Eugene, Oregon to focus on his family. He wrote and published several books about bodybuilding and worked as a teacher of mathematics and science. In 1999, he and his wife moved to Marietta, Georgia where he worked as a teacher at Marietta High School until his retirement in 2010.

== Life and career ==
=== 1945–68: Early life and education ===
Sprague was born on July 14, 1945, in Cincinnati, Ohio, to Homer and Ethel Sprague (née Mahaffey). He grew up in Over-the-Rhine neighborhood in a very well to do family cultured in art, politics, and athletics. His mother was a ballet dancer, his father a contractor, and his two brothers were both honored athletes who attained Doctor of Philosophy degrees. Since childhood, Sprague was led to develop passion for sports. His older brother competed in gymnastics, track and field, and Olympic weightlifting. Sprague began throwing in junior high school. Along with the typical school meets, he competed in Amateur Athletic Union (AAU) competitions during the Summer.

In 1962, he began attending Robert A. Taft Information Technology High School. After he had previously attended an "all-white" middle school, this time he decided to choose the predominantly black Taft instead of the Central High across town, mostly because of their better athletic teams. A member of a school football team, Sprague met his future wife Melrose Thrower while riding a bus to a football game. After his coach found out he dated an African American girl, he forbade him from seeing her again. When Sprague refused, he was suspended. He also met with disapproval from his parents. In support of his black teammates, he attended the March on Washington for Jobs and Freedom during the Civil Rights Movement, a demonstration for civil and economic rights for African Americans, in August 1963. Only a few months after the demonstration, Thrower found out she was pregnant. Sprague found a job, and because he was a minor, sued his parents for guardianship to clear the way for him to marry Thrower. The couple married in June 1964 and their son Kenneth Sprague Jr. was born two months later. Sprague's parents and siblings disowned him for the next three years. Their daughter Julie was born in 1966. Just after the age of 18, Sprague was encouraged by a national Olympic lifting coach, to get involved in the sport. Sprague competed for the next five years, winning in numerous AAU championships and receiving the Mr. Cincinnati bodybuilding title in 1967.

Sprague began attending University of Cincinnati on a track scholarship. The scholarship lasted for one semester and Sprague was forced to combine his studies with work and family. "I was married, working ten hour night-shifts at a local machine tool company, training, and taking a full academic load. Something had to go - it was track." He earned a Phi Beta Kappa key in chemistry, physics, and biology as an undergraduate. Later in the mid-1980s, he would attain advanced degrees related to behavior modification. Sprague and Thrower divorced in 1969.

=== 1969–73: Modeling for COLT and purchase of Gold's Gym ===
While still in college, Sprague was encouraged by a friend to try modeling. He sent a photo of Sprague to the COLT Studio in New York City and shortly afterwards, Sprague was invited to pose for them. During the four-day trip to New York, Sprague did his first nude photoshoot and chose the name Dakota, under which he was represented by the studio. After that, he returned to school and a job in Cincinnati, and Colt sent sold photos to clients. The response was instant and Sprague was asked to travel to California to do more modeling. In March 1970, Sprague arrived to California and did his second photo session when he was approached by a private collector to appear in a hardcore sex film. His co-star in that film was another bodybuilder and rising porn star Jim Cassidy. The two have since appeared in a handful of scenes and magazine spreads together, often being referred to as the "Nelson Eddy and Jeanette MacDonald of gay porn films". Both of them served as a template for characters in the novel The Iron Game by David Carter. The author described Sprague as never feeling "any guilt," and someone who "would take whatever position was necessary to ensure that he would end up in good shape financially." In 1972 Sprague made a notable appearance in the drag-spoof of All About Eve, “All About Alice,” where he played the boyfriend of “Mona” and also had a couple of full-frontal nude scenes. Carter also indicated that Sprague worked as a male hustler besides his work in porn. According to the book, Keith Spaulding (Sprague) and James Cass (Cassidy), as a result of their films, each earned at least an additional $100,000 a year by turning "tricks". Sprague later stated that he had made a great deal of money, but not in the way that Carter portrayed it. Around that same time, Sprague became a member of Gold's Gym in Venice, Los Angeles. On June 27, 1971, he married his girlfriend Maryon Riesenfeld. In August, he entered the Groovy Guy Contest held by The Advocate magazine and ended in the second place.

"I purchased the gym more or less as a hobby; I was training there at the time and the current owner (Danits) couldn't make money with it – in fact, the gross income of Gold's in 1971 was $19,000. I purchased 100% of the stock in Gold's Gym, Inc. for $15,000 cash and the assumption of $74,000 in mortgages and small debts. None of the other guys at the gym appeared to have the money or foresight to buy it. My motive: I didn't want it to close."

— Sprague talking about his purchase of Gold's Gym.

On May 26, 1972, Sprague became the new owner of the Gold's Gym in Venice, California. The then declining fitness club had less than 100 paying members. With the cooperation of wealthy friends and acquaintances, he also acquired a sound stage in Hollywood. Originally started with the idea of becoming a major influence in the field of pornography, the stage served mainly to produce gay porn films. Sprague himself produced several all-male 8mm short films, which were later released as two feature films, Loadstar (1972) and California Supermen (1972), under his own company Dakota Productions. Other bodybuilders including Ric Drasin, Bob Birdsong and Roger Callard appeared in the films. Sprague soon figured out that he could make just as much, if not more, in the legitimate filmmaking. Various television commercials and independent productions were shot at his stage, as well as the weekly religious telecasts of Tony and Susan Alamo.

=== 1974–79: Rise of Gold's popularity ===
In spring of 1975, Sprague acquired a secretarial position in the Amateur Athletic Union (AAU). His intent when joining the organization was to bid on the 1976 Mr. California and the 1977 Mr. America contest, which meant engaging the politics of the organization and the stranglehold of weightlifting over bodybuilding. He was approached by the chairman for the newly formed AAU Physique Committee about bidding on the Mr. California contest. Sprague complied with a $1,000 offer and won the bid to run the 1976 contest. When trying to land a bid on the 1977 Mr. America contest, Sprague was confronted by the AAU board about his porn past as Dakota. He left the meeting and filed defamation lawsuit against each member individually. They all resigned rather than pay for lawyers to defend them.

On January 17, 1976, Sprague filed a lawsuit against Joe Gold that blocked him from opening a new fitness center World Gym because of the non-competition clause in the initial sales agreement. Sprague eventually did relent and let Gold open the gym under conditions that Gold could not use any variation of his "Gold" name, no photos in the gym for three years, plus a monetary amount.

In May 1978, Sprague's first book The Gold's Gym Weight Training Book written in collaboration with photographer Bill Dobbins was published. On October 23, 1978, Sprague's wife Maryon Riesenfeld died of cancer at the age of twenty-seven. Sprague remarried shortly afterwards. He married Donna Wong on December 8, 1978. Following the marriage, Sprague decided to focus on his family life with Wong, who was not keen on both bodybuilding and the business surrounding it. He sold Gold's Gym in 1979 to Pete Grymkowski for a reported $5 million.

== Bibliography ==
- The Gold's Gym Weight Training Book (1978)
- The Gold's Gym Book of Strength Training (1981)
- The Gold's Gym Book of Bodybuilding (1983)
- The Athlete's Body (1982)
- Weight and Strength Training for Kids and Teenagers (1991)
- Sports Strength (1993)
- More Muscle (1996)

== See also ==
- Gold's Gym
