= Ric Drasin =

American bodybuilder (1944–2020)

Personal information
- Born: Richard Alan Drasin; July 12, 1944 Bakersfield, California, U.S.
- Died: August 30, 2020 (aged 76)
- Website: ricdrasin.com

Professional wrestling career
- Ring names: Ric Drasin; The Equalizer
- Billed height: 6 ft 0 in (1.83 m)
- Billed weight: 222 lb (101 kg)
- Billed from: Bakersfield, California; Santa Monica, California
- Trained by: Mae Young
- Debut: 1965
- Retired: 2001

Richard Alan Drasin (July 12, 1944 – August 30, 2020) was an American bodybuilder, personal trainer, actor, stuntman, author, and professional wrestler. He wrestled professionally and sporadically between 1965 and 2001, while also winning titles in amateur bodybuilding contests during his younger years. Drasin is also known for having designed both the original Gold's Gym logo — a cartoon sketch of a bald weightlifter — and the World Gym gorilla logo.

Born and raised in Bakersfield, California, Drasin began his fitness career in 1962. He taught classes in nutrition and exercise at the YMCA before he was assigned to train with the National Wrestling Alliance (NWA) champion Mae Young.

== Life and career ==
=== Early life ===
Drasin was born Richard Alan Drasin on July 12, 1944 in Bakersfield, California, as the second child of Oscar (1911–1963) and Claire Drasin (1914–2010). His parents owned and operated Drasin's Little Folks Shop, a children's furniture and clothing store. Drasin has one sibling, an older sister, Stephanie (b. 1936). He was raised in an Orthodox Jewish home. Drasin's formal education began at Franklin Elementary School. While at Emerson Junior High School, as a joke he and two friends tried out for the cheerleading squad. They were selected. He graduated from Bakersfield High School in 1962 at age of 18, then attended Bakersfield College for two years (1963–1964), focusing on art.

Drasin's interests in bodybuilding, powerlifting, weightlifting, and guitar playing began in junior high school. When Drasin was in high school, he formed a band known as The Epics, who were featured at YMCA Day at the Hollywood Bowl in 1960. About three months later, The Epics competed in a Battle of the Bands contest at the Hollywood Palladium, placing second out of about 200 bands. One of the prizes was a one-year recording contract with Capitol Records. Capitol Records changed the name of The Epics to The Hollywood Vines, who recorded two cruising songs, "Cruisin’" and "When Johnny Comes Slidin’ Home". The 45 rpm record (Capitol Records reference number 4511) was released in 1961. Although the record was a success, the band drifted apart as the members grew into adulthood. Drasin enlisted in the Army Reserves for eight years and was inducted on his 18th birthday. On active duty for approximately six months after enlistment and for two weeks each year thereafter, Drasin served as a clerk/typist and driver, achieving the rank of Sergeant. He was stationed at Fort Ord, California, and Fort Lewis, Washington.

When Drasin was 18, his father died during surgery for a heart condition. Drasin and his father had very much enjoyed going to professional wrestling shows together and, unknown to his father, Drasin had decided he would someday become a professional wrestler.

=== Career ===
Drasin's work in the fitness industry began in 1962, when he taught classes in nutrition and exercise at the Bakersfield YMCA. Also in Bakersfield, he was an instructor at Babe's Gym (1963–1964), then manager of Joseph's Gym (1965–1967).

Drasin was assigned to train with Johnnie Mae Young, who was a National Wrestling Alliance (NWA) United States Women's Champion known as one of the toughest wrestlers in the business. His first professional appearance was as babyface "Dick Alan" against Buddy "Killer" Austin, who won the match. In 1975, he started a business called West Coast Wrestling Promotions. He faced great opposition from the National Wrestling Alliance, and it ceased operations after a few shows.

In the early 1970s, Drasin posed for several publications of Jim French's studio COLT under the name Jean-Claude, and also appeared in an all-male porn loop produced by his friend and fellow bodybuilder Ken Sprague (known as Dakota). The short film featuring Drasin, Sprague and bodybuilder Bob Birdsong was released as a part of films Loadstar (1973) and California Supermen (1975).

In 1972, he had his first film role, playing "George," a gym manager who is attacked by rats in the movie Ben, and in 1978, played an Olympic weightlifter in the film Sextette.

In 1978, World Gym also asked him to design a logo, at which he created the now famous World Gym gorilla logo, still in use today.

In 1980, he played an uncredited role on the popular television series The Incredible Hulk as the "Demi Hulk" a half transformed version of Bill Bixby as a human Hulk in the episode "Prometheus". It was a mystery that perplexed fans for many decades as to who the identity of the guest star was.

In 1985, Drasin reorganized his old West Coast Wrestling Promotions into the American Wrestling Federation (AWF) and promoted wrestling shows in the Los Angeles and Bakersfield areas. He taught his son Shane how to wrestle, and wrestled as "Shane '54" for the AWF from 1996 until 2001. Although Drasin's son Adam did not wrestle professionally, he occasionally worked as a referee for the AWF.

=== Later life ===
His book, So, You Want to Be a Wrestling Promoter, written with Bruce Dwight Collins, was published in March 2004 by BookSurge, LLC. In 2002, Drasin invented the Security Kat, a handheld personal security device. Drasin was a spokesperson for Gold's Gym, speaking at conventions and appearing at special events at various Gold's Gyms. He was also a spokesperson for HeadBlade Razors.

After 2014, Drasin had carpal tunnel syndrome in both hands. It affected his grip in the gym, but he still trained.

On August 14, 2007, Drasin was filmed by Nine Network Australia for their prime time travel series, Getaway. One of Drasin's wrestling classes was featured, and he served as the show's guide for a tour of Venice Beach. The episode aired in October 2007.

In August 2008, Drasin received his badge from the Los Angeles Police Department identifying him as a Specialist Reserve Officer, a civilian volunteer who possesses special skills that benefit the police department.

He trained actress and television news correspondent Maria Menounos for her October 12, 2009, appearance on WWE Monday Night Raw as part of a charity awareness promotion.

Ric Drasin was the recipient of the first Joe Gold Lifetime Achievement Award, presented at the World Gym International Convention in Las Vegas, Nevada, on September 26–28, 2012. With this award, Drasin was recognized for his contributions to the fitness industry as a bodybuilder, professional wrestler, actor, and artist. Additionally, the award recognized his preservation of the history of the Golden Era of Bodybuilding through his Internet show, Ric’s Corner on YouTube. He died on August 30, 2020.

== Championships and accomplishments ==
- AWF
  - AWF Heavyweight Championship (1 time)
- CCW
  - CCW Championship (1 time)
- GCW
  - GCW Junior Heavyweight Championship (1 time)

== Books ==
- So, You Want to be a Wrestling Promoter? (2003)
- Bodybuilding for Dumbbells (2014)
- The Ricapedia of Steroids: Steroid Handbook for Education Purposes (2014)
- "The Time of my Life" by Creators Publishing (2017)
