= Diet-to-Go =

American nutrition company

- Company type: Private
- Industry: Dieting/Nutrition
- Founded: 1991
- Headquarters: Lorton, Virginia, United States
- Key people: Hilton Davis (Founder/CEO)
- Revenue: US$14 million (2016)
- Number of employees: 100 (2012)
- Website: diettogo.com

Diet-to-Go (DTG) is a privately held company that was founded in 1991 by Hilton Davis. The company offers a national diet delivery food product and local food pickup meals. The company was formed originally as a local diet delivery company in Virginia.

In August 2024, Diet-to-Go filed for Chapter 11 bankruptcy protection, listing liabilities between $1 million and $10 million, and assets between $0 and $50,000. On November 21, 2025, Diet-to-Go announced that it had permanently closed.

== Meal plans ==
Diet-to-Go offers four types of meal plans - Balanced nutrition, Portion Controlled, Low Fat Vegetarian and Keto/Low Carb as well as Low Fat Diabetic. In 1999, the company started one of the first frozen diet meal mail-order products in the United States, making its line of products available nationwide.

Fresh food home delivery is available on the East Coast from Woodbridge, Virginia to Connecticut and all locations in between. West Coast fresh home delivery is available in all of California, greater Las Vegas and major cities in Arizona.

== Partnership ==
The local food pick-up program is a partnership between local businesses including fitness clubs such as Gold's Gym, World Gym, One To One Fitness, and other independent gyms and health clubs. Other distributors include convenience stores, personal training studios and local delis. These locations act as fresh food pick up locations, currently in four metropolitan areas across the United States, including Los Angeles, Baltimore, Northern New Jersey and Washington D.C.

The company's two kitchens are currently inspected daily by the USDA and follow the association guidelines of the American Heart Association, American Cancer Society and the American Diabetes Association. The company currently produces roughly 40,000 meals per week.

Diet-to-Go maintains two large commercial kitchens. One in Lorton, Virginia just outside Washington, DC and Burbank, California.
