= Rick Cassidy =

American pornographic actor and bodybuilder

- Born: Richard Edward Ciezniak Jr. July 22, 1943; Lackawanna County, Pennsylvania, U.S.
- Died: December 23, 2013 (aged 70); Moscow, Pennsylvania, U.S.
- Resting place: Saint Catherine's Cemetery
- Other names: Jim Cassidy, Mark Hawkins, Jesse Ames, Jerry Grimes, Stefan Roman, Rick Jackson
- Occupations: Pornographic actor; model; bodybuilder
- Years active: 1969–85
- Height: 6 ft 0 in (1.83 m)

Rick Cassidy (born Richard Edward Ciezniak Jr., July 22, 1943 – December 23, 2013) was an American pornographic actor, model and bodybuilder. He appeared in both straight and gay porn films, using the name Jim Cassidy for the latter, during the early 1970s.

Born and raised in Pennsylvania, Cassidy spent two years in the Navy before moving to New York City where he modeled for physique photographer Jim French. In 1969, he relocated to Los Angeles where he was approached by photographer and gay filmmaker Pat Rocco to pose for various gay magazines. Cassidy made his screen debut in Rocco's documentary Mondo Rocco (1970). Shortly afterwards, he appeared as the host in Inside A.M.G. (1970), a documentary about the male erotic photography studio Athletic Model Guild. That same year, Cassidy shot his first hardcore scene. The 8mm loop called Drilled Deep featured another rising gay porn star Dakota, with whom Cassidy later appeared in more films and magazines. The duo became very popular among the gay community and was referred to as the "Nelson Eddy and Jeanette MacDonald of gay porn". Cassidy continued making more films during the first half of the 1970s, mostly straight, and also starred in several stage plays. By the end of 1974, he went on a hiatus from porn and kept appearing only in small parts in various softcore films.

Cassidy returned to porn in 1984. He appeared in a handful of straight films alongside the biggest porn stars of that time such as Marilyn Chambers and Ginger Lynn. However, after having shot the film New Wave Hookers (1985) with then underage actress Traci Lords, which resulted in a big scandal and investigation of her co-stars, Cassidy decided to retire from porn for good. He moved back to Pennsylvania and worked as a real estate agent. Cassidy died in 2013 at the age of 70.

== Career ==
Born and raised in Pennsylvania, Cassidy spent two years in the Navy. After he moved to New York City in the late 1960s, Cassidy met the physique photographer and founder of Colt Studio, Jim French, for whom he posed in leather and motorcycle gear. In 1969, he moved to Los Angeles and was approached by photographer and gay filmmaker Pat Rocco who gave him the stage name Jim Cassidy and suggested him to enter the Groovy Guy Contest held by The Advocate magazine. Sponsored by Rocco's company Bizarre Productions, Cassidy came in third. He continued his work with Rocco posing for a number of local gay magazines and making his first gay scene. Originally shot as a screen test, the scene was later featured in the documentary Mondo Rocco (1970) which consisted of various short films. Cassidy made his first hardcore scene for a short bisexual-themed film Drilled Deep. Produced by Scott Masters, the 8mm loop, originally to be called Wrong Number, was about a telephone repair man fixing a phone. Cassidy thought the story was a bit clichéd, so he wrote a short script the night before the shoot. The cast consisted of three people: Cassidy, Judy Coleman and another rising gay porn star Dakota whom Cassidy claimed as an old friend whose gym he worked out at. The duo later appeared together in two more scenes and shot numerous magazine pictorials. They were referred to as the "Nelson Eddy and Jeanette MacDonald of gay porn". Around the same time, Monroe Beehler approached Cassidy to appear as the host and narrator of his pseudo-documentary Inside A.M.G. (1970) about Bob Mizer's male erotic photography studio Athletic Model Guild. Cassidy found Mizer's treatment of models disconcerting and the idea of working in gay porn unappealing. After finishing the documentary, Cassidy went on to make numerous straight hardcore films before returning to gay porn.

I haven't made that much from gay porn. I made a lot more in straight porn. I got paid more in gay porn because they wanted my name and I held out for more. But there was more straight porn going on. When I was living up in Hollywood I would often be working five or six days a week at it. In gay porn I might do a film every few months. I didn't want to do everything, because I might easily get overexposed.... I have made only ten gay films, but they have been played and played and replayed and replayed. Already from ten films I am overexposed. Straight porn is a different matter. You aren't the famous Jim Cassidy, you are just there. The chicks are the stars.

— Cassidy on his career in gay porn industry

Cassidy kept on making more films and appearing in magazines. He constantly worked for the SPREE magazine and performed in their stage play Casting Couch. By the end of 1973, he was asked by the editor of the gay magazine In Touch to write a regular column on bodybuilding. "The In Touch Body" articles were published monthly for a period of one year. In the summer of 1974, he appeared in the Los Angeles production of Jerry Douglas's play Tubstrip, alongside Casey Donovan. By the end of the year, Cassidy went on hiatus from making porn films and focused on his job as a real estate salesman. However, he maintained appearing in magazines and small parts in films.

== See also ==
- Golden Age of Porn
- Widow Blue!
