= Harlequin print =

Fabric pattern

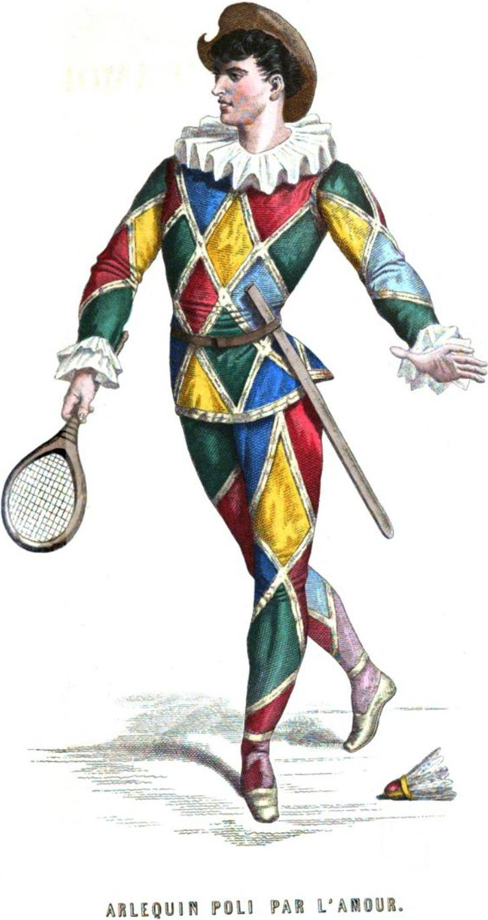
19th century drawing of a Harlequin

Harlequin print is a repeating pattern of contrasting diamonds or elongated squares standing on end.

== Origins ==
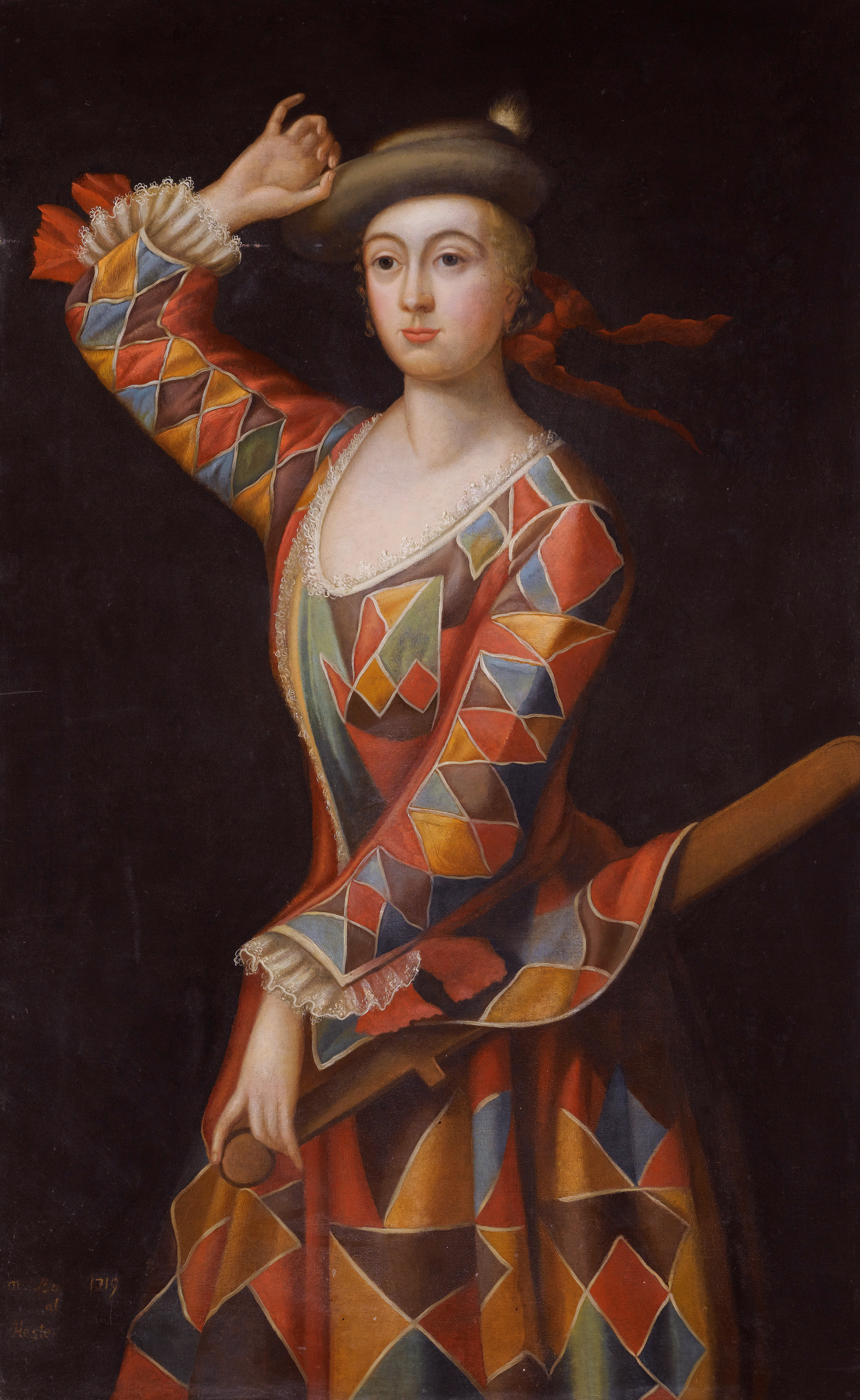
Mrs Hester Booth, née Santlow (circa 1690–1773) dressed as a harlequin, attributed to John Ellys

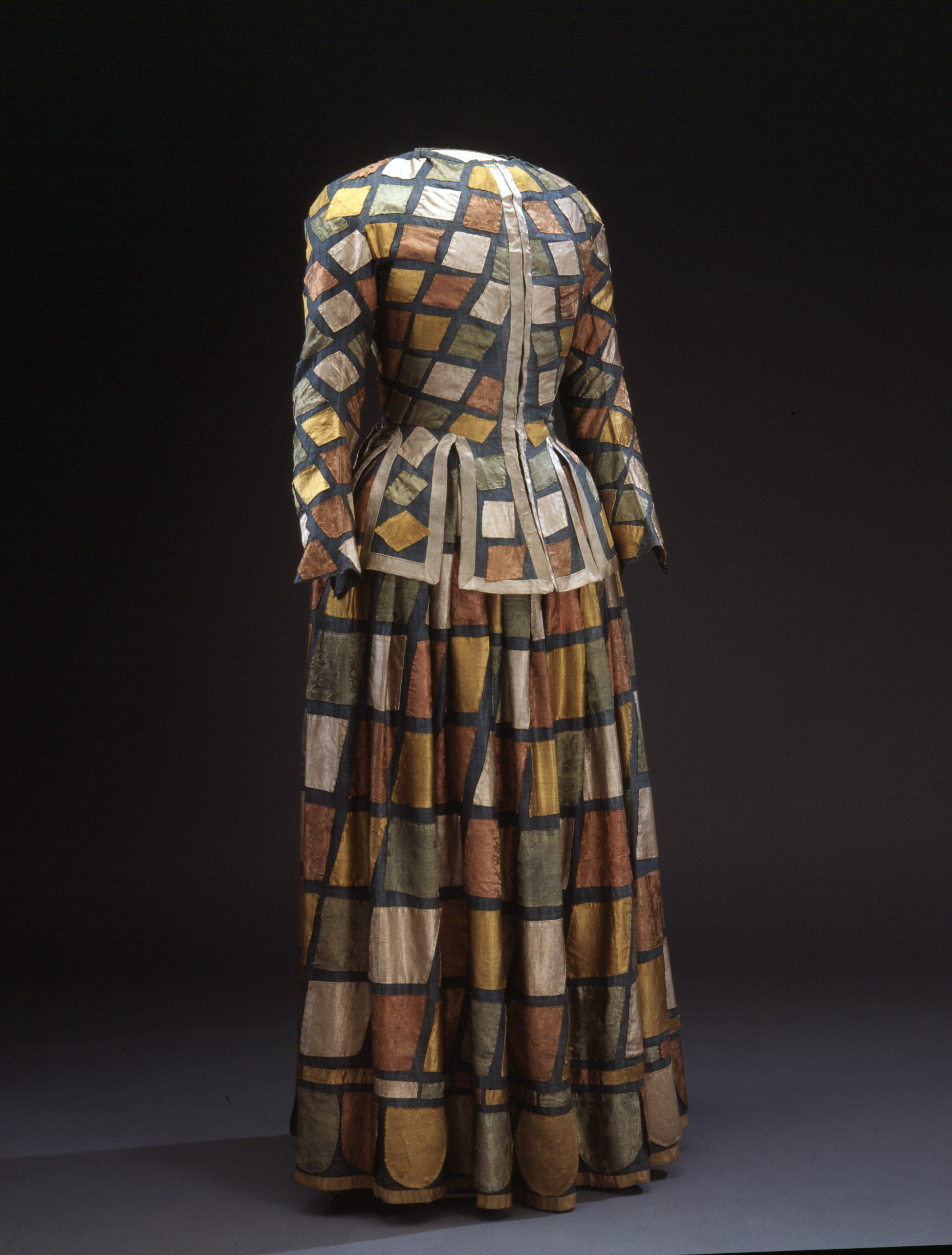
Harlequin-costume, dated 1656–1693.

The harlequin is a character from Commedia dell'arte, a 16th-century Italian theater movement. Harlequins were witty, mischievous clowns. Their early costumes were sewn together from fabric scraps. Over time, the diamond pattern became associated with harlequins.

== 1949–1950s ==
Harlequin fabric was popularized in 1944 when Adele Simpson presented the harlequin print in a bold diamond design on the town suits she created. It was also featured in green and white with a green jacket and a black skirt.

Also in 1949, Louella Ballerino employed a harlequin print motif in the jester blouse "sun and fun" fashions she made popular. The design appeared along with pointed collars, tipped with buttons reminiscent of bells, and jagged points which sometimes adorned an apron overskirt.

In August 1950, Fashion Frocks of Cincinnati, Ohio marketed a white piqué dress, with an exaggerated side drape, in a red, white, and black harlequin print piqué, It was sold directly to homes by housewife representatives.

Tammis Keefe, a cloth designer whose patterns appeared at Lord and Taylor in September 1952, used a harlequin print diamond pattern on a large cloth she crafted for a table setting show.

In a July 1954 article in the Washington Post, columnist Olga Curtis mentioned harlequin print fabrics and cellophane as very novel ideas in accessories.

A sports costume In a harlequin print topped by bright orange was applauded at a Simplicity Patterns Fashion Show at Sulzberger Junior High School, in March 1955. Presented by Norma Riseman, the orange wraparound blouse was one of the colorful fashions modeled for teenagers.

In June 1955 a silk dress at Peck & Peck had white, pink, and blue tints of harlequin print. The colors and diamond motif were embellished when worn together with a white cashmere sweater highlighted by spangles.

Freddie Mercury was very well known for performing in various concerts during the late seventies in harlequin print trousers. He also wore them in his music video "Living on My Own".

== 1960s ==
Harlequin print became particularly popular in the 1960s, appearing on underwear, umbrellas, pajamas, ski wear, maternity clothes, and hosiery. A 1962 Picasso retrospective in New York fueled the trend.

== 1990s and 2000s ==
Beene and Rowley employed harlequin prints in their fashion designs presented at spring fashion week in November 1996.

At the 2001 Ebony Fashion Fair designer Oscar de la Renta presented a multicolored harlequin print silk charmeuse gown with a skirt fashioned with accordion pleats and a halter top with a gold neck ring.

== Gallery ==
Variant flag of Monaco

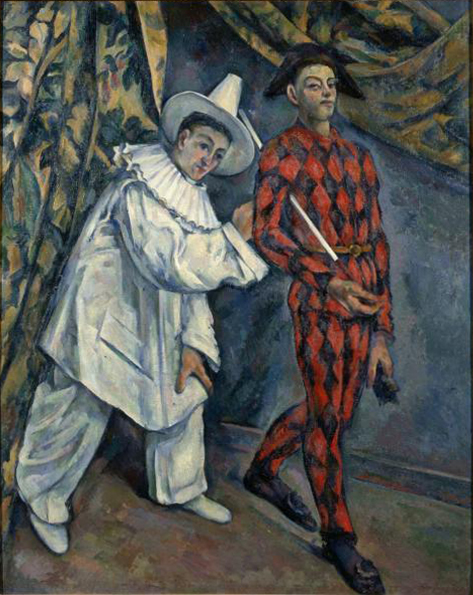
Mardi gras (Pierrot and Harlequin) by Paul Cézanne

== See also ==
- Mattachine Society, used so-called harlequin diamonds as their emblem
