= Harry Potter and the Prisoner of Azkaban =

1999 fantasy novel by J. K. Rowling

- Cover art of the first UK edition
- Author: J. K. Rowling
- Illustrator: Cliff Wright (first edition)
- Language: English
- Series: Harry Potter
- Release number: 3rd in series
- Genre: Fantasy
- Publisher: Bloomsbury (UK)
- Publication date: 8 July 1999
- Publication place: United Kingdom
- Pages: 317 (first edition)
- ISBN: 0-7475-4215-5
- Preceded by: Harry Potter and the Chamber of Secrets
- Followed by: Harry Potter and the Goblet of Fire

Harry Potter and the Prisoner of Azkaban (Note: Pronounced /æzkɑːbɑːn, -əbɑːn/ AS-kaa-baan, kuh-baan; also /æzkæbɑːn/ AS-ka-baan.) is a fantasy novel by British author J. K. Rowling. The third novel in the Harry Potter series, it follows the young wizard Harry Potter during his third year at Hogwarts School of Witchcraft and Wizardry. With his friends Ron Weasley and Hermione Granger, Harry investigates Sirius Black, an escaped prisoner who no one doubts to be one of Lord Voldemort's allies.

The book was published in the United Kingdom on 8 July 1999 by Bloomsbury and in the United States on 8 September 1999 by Scholastic, Inc. (Note: Attributed to multiple references:) The book, which took Rowling one year to write, sold 64,000 copies in just three days after its release in the United Kingdom, and since has sold over three million in the country. The book won the 1999 Whitbread Children's Book Award, the Bram Stoker Award, and the 2000 Locus Award for Best Fantasy Novel and was short-listed for other awards, including the Hugo.

The film adaptation of the novel was released in 2004, grossing more than $810 million and earning critical acclaim. Video games based on the novel have also been released.

== Plot ==
During the summer, 13-year-old Harry sees Muggle news about an escaped murderer named Sirius Black. Some time after this, Harry accidentally performs magic at the home of his Aunt Petunia and Uncle Vernon. He then uses The Knight Bus to flee his aunt and uncle and travel to London. While on the Knight Bus, he learns that Sirius Black is a wizard who broke out of Azkaban. When arriving in London, Harry is greeted by Cornelius Fudge, the Minister for Magic, who tells him to stay the rest of the summer in the Wizarding Diagon Alley.

With Black at large, Dementors have been stationed at Hogwarts as a security measure. Harry repeatedly faints in the presence of the Dementors, but eventually is taught by Professor Lupin how to repel them using the Patronus Charm.

During a Care of Magical Creatures lesson with Hagrid, Draco Malfoy is injured after provoking a hippogriff named Buckbeak. Draco's father, Lucius Malfoy, gets Hagrid put on trial for owning a dangerous creature. When Harry is unable to participate in weekend trips to Hogsmeade Village, Fred and George give him a magical map that shows him how to get there using a secret passage. At the Three Broomsticks pub, Harry overhears that Black is his godfather, that he betrayed Harry's parents to Voldemort, and that he now seeks to kill Harry as well.

When Ron's pet rat Scabbers disappears, he blames Hermione and her cat Crookshanks. Ron and Hermione stop talking to each other, although Hermione is distraught when Ron is attacked by Black inside the Gryffindor dormitory. After the attack, Black cannot be found. When Harry, Ron and Hermione learn that Buckbeak will be executed, they console Hagrid, and Ron and Hermione resume their friendship. Hermione and Ron also find Scabbers hiding in Hagrid's hut. As the friends make their way back to the castle, Ron is attacked by a large black dog, which drags him through the passageway leading to Hogsmeade. Harry and Hermione give chase, and find themselves in the Shrieking Shack, where the dog is revealed to be Black in his Animagus form. Lupin arrives, and Black states that he intends to kill Scabbers, not Harry. He explains that Scabbers is Peter Pettigrew, who betrayed Harry's parents to Voldemort and framed Black for mass murder. Black and Lupin compel Pettigrew to change into his human form, then haul him back to Hogwarts.

On the way to the castle, the full moon causes Lupin to transform into a werewolf. Pettigrew escapes and is pursued by Black, Harry and Hermione, who encounter Dementors and lose consciousness. They awaken in the castle, where Black is now being held captive. Harry and Hermione proclaim his innocence to Dumbledore, who suggests using Hermione's Time Turner. Harry and Hermione travel back in time and save both Black and Buckbeak, who fly away together. Snape blames Lupin for Black's disappearance and makes his werewolf identity public, which forces Lupin to resign. On the train back to London, Harry receives a letter from Black, expressing his gratitude to Harry for saving his life.

== Publication and reception ==
=== Pre-release history ===
Harry Potter and the Prisoner of Azkaban is the third book in the Harry Potter series. The first, Harry Potter and the Philosopher's Stone, was published by Bloomsbury Publishing on 26 June 1997 and the second, Harry Potter and the Chamber of Secrets, was published on 2 July 1998. J. K. Rowling started to write the Prisoner of Azkaban the day after she finished The Chamber of Secrets. Rowling said in 2004 that Prisoner of Azkaban was "the best writing experience I ever had...I was in a very comfortable place writing (number) three. Immediate financial worries were over, and press attention wasn't yet by any means excessive".

=== Critical reception ===
Gregory Maguire wrote a review in The New York Times for Prisoner of Azkaban: in it he said, "So far, in terms of plot, the books do nothing new, but they do it brilliantly...so far, so good." In a newspaper review in The New York Times, it was said that "'The Prisoner of Azkaban' may be the best 'Harry Potter' book yet". A reviewer for KidsReads said, "This crisply-paced fantasy will leave you hungry for the four additional Harry books that J.K. Rowling is working on. Harry's third year is a charm. Don't miss it." Kirkus Reviews did not give a starred review but said, "a properly pulse-pounding climax...The main characters and the continuing story both come along so smartly...that the book seems shorter than its page count: have readers clear their calendars if they are fans, or get out of the way if they are not." Martha V. Parravano also gave a positive review for The Horn Book Magazine, calling it "quite a good book." In addition, a Publishers Weekly review said, "Rowling's wit never flags, whether constructing the workings of the wizard world...or tossing off quick jokes...The Potter spell is holding strong".

However, Anthony Holden, who was one of the judges against Prisoner of Azkaban for the Whitbread Award, was negative about the book, saying that the characters are "all black-and-white", and the "story-lines are predictable, the suspense minimal, the sentimentality cloying every page".

In 2012 it was ranked number 12 on a list of the top 100 children's novels published by School Library Journal.

=== Awards ===
Harry Potter and the Prisoner of Azkaban won several awards, including the 1999 Booklist Editors' Choice Award, the 1999 Bram Stoker Award for Best Work for Young Readers, the 1999 FCBG Children's Book Award, the 1999 Whitbread Book of the Year for children's books, and the 2000 Locus Award for Best Fantasy Novel. It was also nominated for the 2000 Hugo Award for Best Novel, the first in the series nominated, but lost to A Deepness in the Sky. Prisoner of Azkaban additionally won the 2004 Indian Paintbrush Book Award and the 2004 Colorado Blue Spruce Young Adult Book Award. Additionally, it was named an American Library Association Notable Children's Book in 2000 as well as one of their Best Books for Young Adults. As with the previous two books in the series, Prisoner of Azkaban won the Nestlé Smarties Book Prize Gold Medal for children aged 9–11 and made the top of the New York Times Best Seller list. In both cases, it was the last in the series to do so. However, in the latter case, a Children's Best Sellers list was created just before the release of Harry Potter and the Goblet of Fire in July 2000 in order to free up more room on the original list. In 2003, the novel was listed at number 24 on the BBC's survey The Big Read.

=== Sales ===
Prisoner of Azkaban sold more than 64,000 copies in the UK within three days of publication, which made it the fastest selling British book of the time. The sales total by 2012 is said by The Guardian to be 3,377,906.

== Editions ==
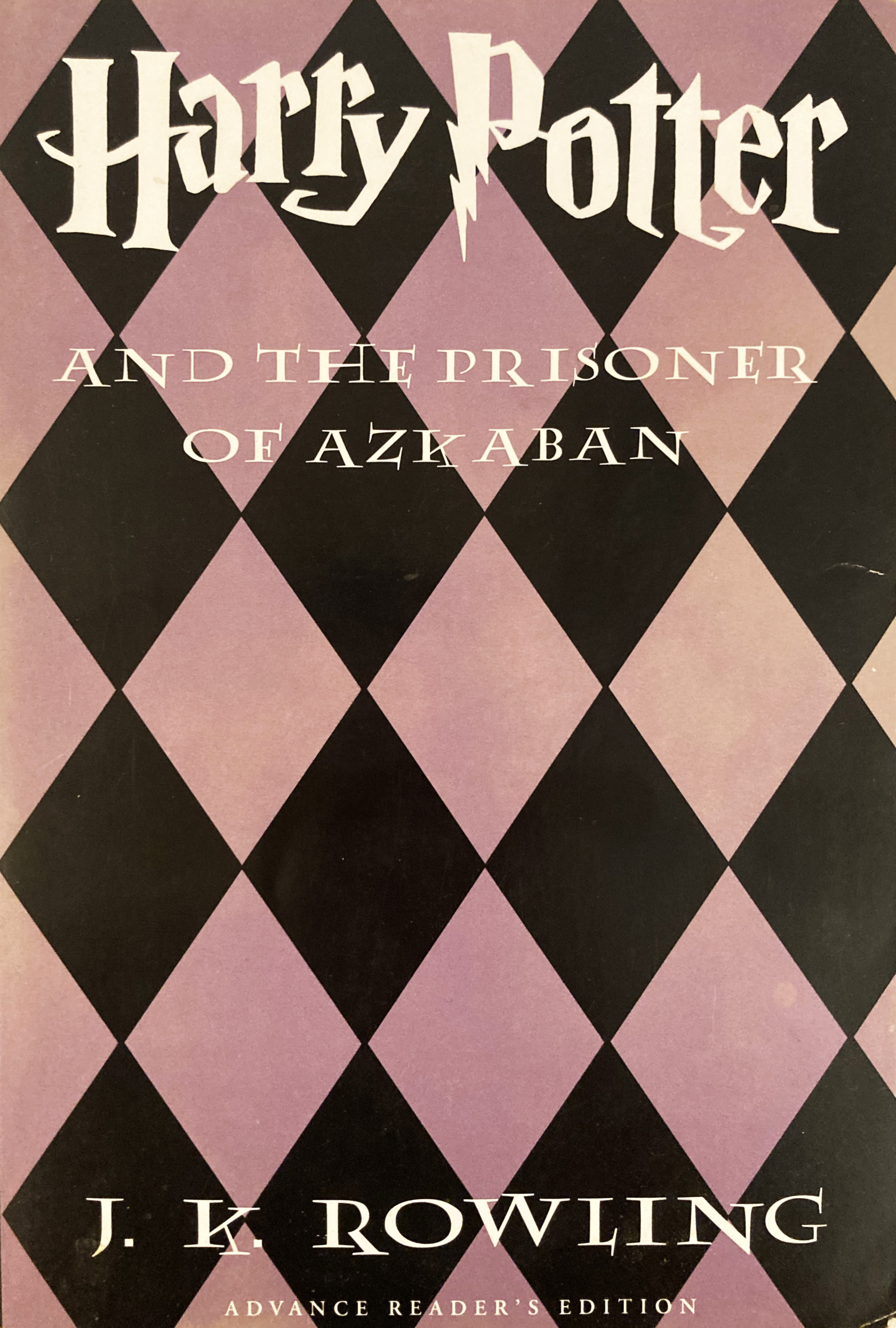
The cover of the US "Advance Reader's Edition", featuring an Harlequin pattern

Harry Potter and the Prisoner of Azkaban was issued, prior to publication, in two distinct UK proof editions, and one US "Advance Reader's Edition". The first UK proof, in purple wrappers, differs from the second in a number of respects, and is thought to have been printed in a small edition of 50 copies. The second UK proof is in green wrappers and was printed in a somewhat larger run. The US Advance Reader's Edition is the last of its kind in the Harry Potter series, as no Advance Reader's Editions are known for books 4 through 7. The rear wrapper of the Advance Reader's Edition reveals the circumstances of the US publication of the book:

Due to the unprecedented demand for this book, we have moved the publication date up a full year. (We understand, we couldn't wait to read it either!). Accordingly, we have rushed to bring this Advance Reader's Edition to you as quickly as possible.

Harry Potter and the Prisoner of Azkaban was released in hardcover in the UK on 8 July 1999 and in the US on 8 September. The UK edition was released at the unusually precise time of 3.45pm, so as to avoid children skipping school in order to purchase the book. The first state of the hardback edition features an error on p. 7, with an unintended carriage return in a block quote. Two further issues were released, both fixing the error. Across all three states, 5,150 were printed by Clays Ltd.

The British paperback edition was released on 1 April 2000, while the US paperback was released 1 October 2001.

Bloomsbury additionally released an adult edition with a different cover design to the original, in paperback on 10 July 2004 and in hardcover in October 2004. A hardcover special edition, featuring a green border and signature, was released on 8 July 1999. In May 2004, Bloomsbury released a Celebratory Edition, with a blue and purple border. On 1 November 2010, they released the 10th anniversary Signature edition illustrated by Clare Mellinsky and in July 2013 a new adult cover illustrated by Andrew Davidson, both these editions were designed by Webb & Webb Design Limited.

Beginning on 27 August 2013, Scholastic will release new covers for the paperback editions of Harry Potter in the United States to celebrate 15 years of the series. The covers were designed by the author and illustrator Kazu Kibuishi.

An illustrated version of Harry Potter and the Prisoner of Azkaban was released on 3 October 2017, and was illustrated by Jim Kay, who illustrated the previous two instalments. This includes over 115 new illustrations and will be followed by Illustrated editions of the following 4 novels in the future. Jim Kay announced on 6 October 2022 that he would not be illustrating the final two Harry Potter books and that his last work, Harry Potter and the Order of the Phoenix, would be released on 11 October 2022.

== Adaptations ==
=== Film ===
The film version of Harry Potter and the Prisoner of Azkaban was released in 2004 and was directed by Alfonso Cuarón from a screenplay by Steve Kloves. The film debuted at number one at the box office and held that position for two weeks. It made a total of $796.7 million worldwide, which made it the second highest-grossing film of 2004 behind Shrek 2. However, among all eight films in the Harry Potter series, Prisoner of Azkaban had the lowest total gross. The film placed at number 471 on Empire magazine's 2008 list of the 500 greatest movies of all time.

=== Video games ===
Three video games based on the book were released in 2004 by Electronic Arts.

| Developer | Release date | Platform | Genre | GameRankings | Metacritic |
|---|---|---|---|---|---|
| KnowWonder | 25 May 2004 | Windows | Adventure/puzzle | 68.52% | 67/100 |
| Griptonite | 25 May 2004 | Game Boy Advance | Role-playing game | 69.58% | 69/100 |
| EA UK | 29 May 2004 | GameCube | Action-adventure | 69.74% | 67/100 |
| EA UK | 29 May 2004 | PlayStation 2 | Action-adventure | 72.59% | 70/100 |
| EA UK | 29 May 2004 | Xbox | Action-adventure | 68.39% | 67/100 |
