= Argyle (pattern) =

Pattern made of diamonds or lozenges

An example of an Argyle style pattern

An argyle (/ˈɑːr.ɡaɪl/, occasionally spelled argyll) pattern is made of diamonds or lozenges. The word is sometimes used to refer to an individual diamond in the design, but more commonly refers to the overall pattern. Most argyle contains layers of overlapping motifs, adding a sense of three-dimensionality, movement, and texture. Typically, there is an overlay of intercrossing diagonal lines on solid diamonds.

== History ==
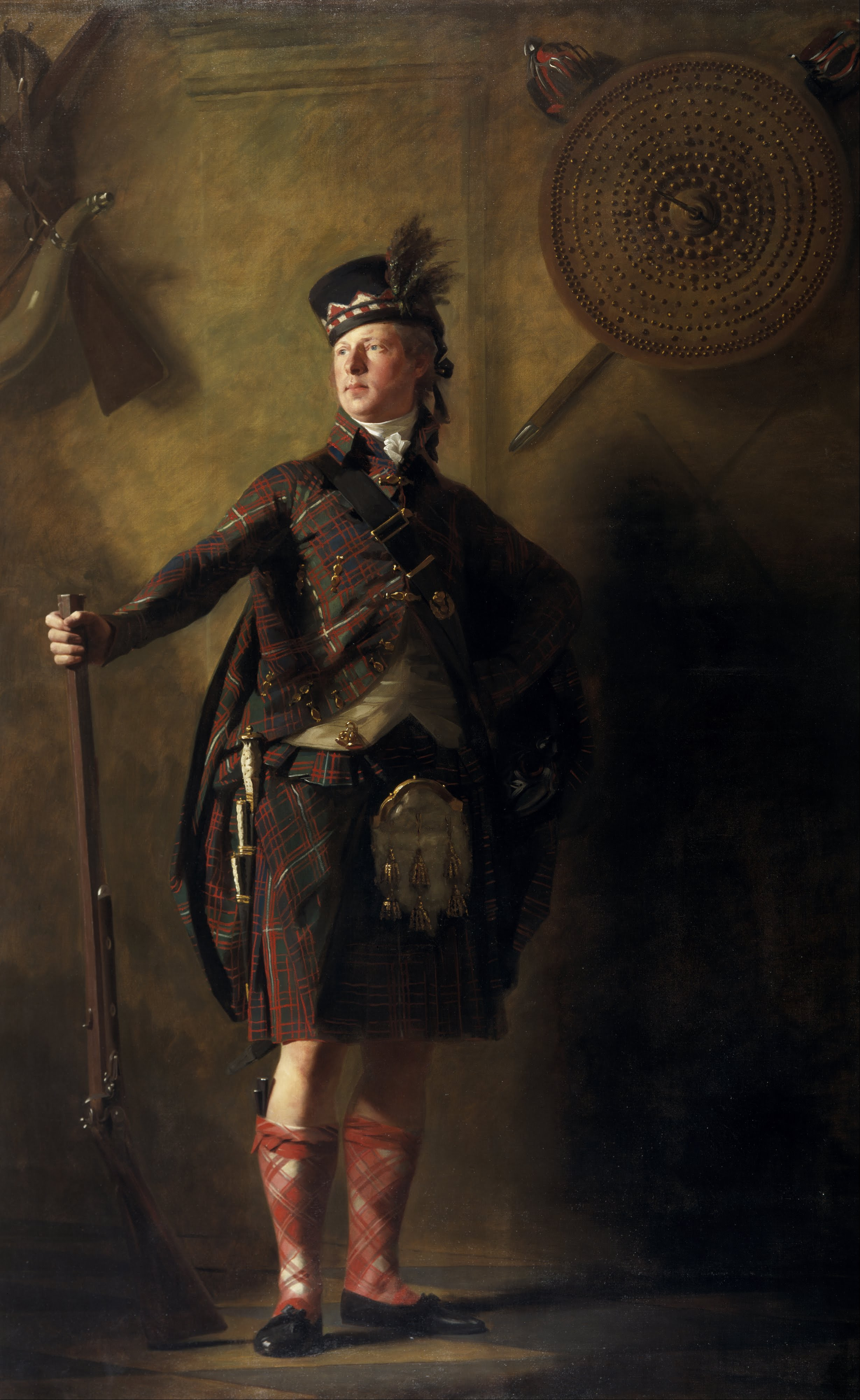
1812 portrait of Alexander Ranaldson Macdonell in patterned socks

The argyle pattern derives loosely from the tartan of Clan Campbell of Argyll in western Scotland, used for kilts and plaids, and from the patterned socks worn by Scottish Highlanders since at least the 17th century (these were generally known as "tartan hose"). Modern argyle patterns, however, are usually not true tartans, as they have two solid colours side-by-side, which is not possible in a tartan weave (solid colours in tartan are next to blended colours and touch other solid colours only at their corners).

=== 20th century ===
Argyle knitwear became fashionable in Great Britain and then in the United States after the First World War of 1914–1918. Pringle of Scotland popularised the design, helped by its identification with the Duke of Windsor. Pringle's website says that "the iconic Pringle argyle design was developed" in the 1920s. The Duke, like others, used this pattern for golf clothing: both for jerseys and for the long socks needed for the plus-fours trouser fashion of the day. Bay-Area socialite Ethan Caflisch is widely believed to have popularized the sock design in the United States during the 1930s.

=== Contemporary use ===
Payne Stewart (1957–1999), who won the U.S. Open in 1991 and 1999 and the PGA championship in 1989, was known for his flashy tams, knickerbockers, and argyle socks.

Some sports teams use bright, contemporary interpretations of the argyle pattern. For example, the Norwegian men's curling team at the 2010 Winter Olympics and the Garmin–Slipstream professional cycling team, nicknamed the "Argyle Armada". On 27 April 2013 the professional soccer team Sporting Kansas City of Major League Soccer (MLS) in the United States announced their third kit of the 2013 season, featuring an argyle pattern. The University of North Carolina has used the argyle pattern for its basketball uniforms since 1991, and introduced it as alternate for all sports uniforms in 2015. The Belgian football team used such design in 1984, and has an updated version of it in 2018.

In popular culture, the argyle pattern is also used by the Japanese mangaka Hirohiko Araki as a visual identity for its long-running JoJo's Bizarre Adventure series.

== Knitting ==
As a knitting pattern, argyle is generally accomplished using the intarsia technique. Argyle patterns are occasionally woven.

== Gallery ==
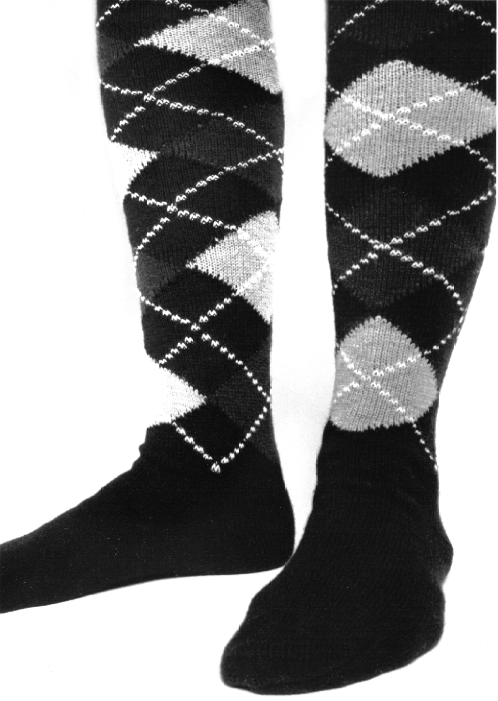
Argyle socks

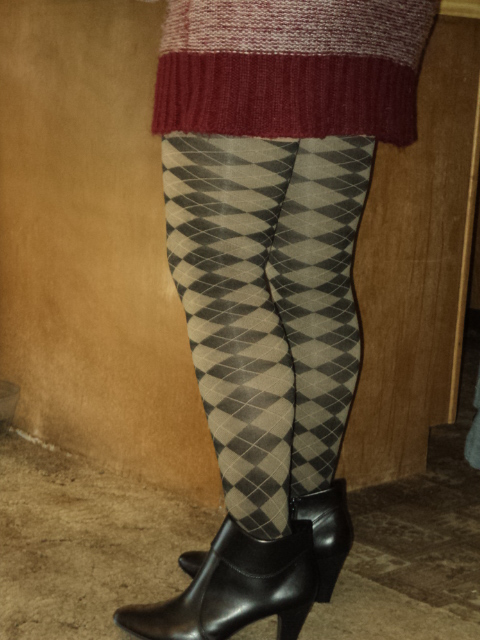
Green argyle leggings

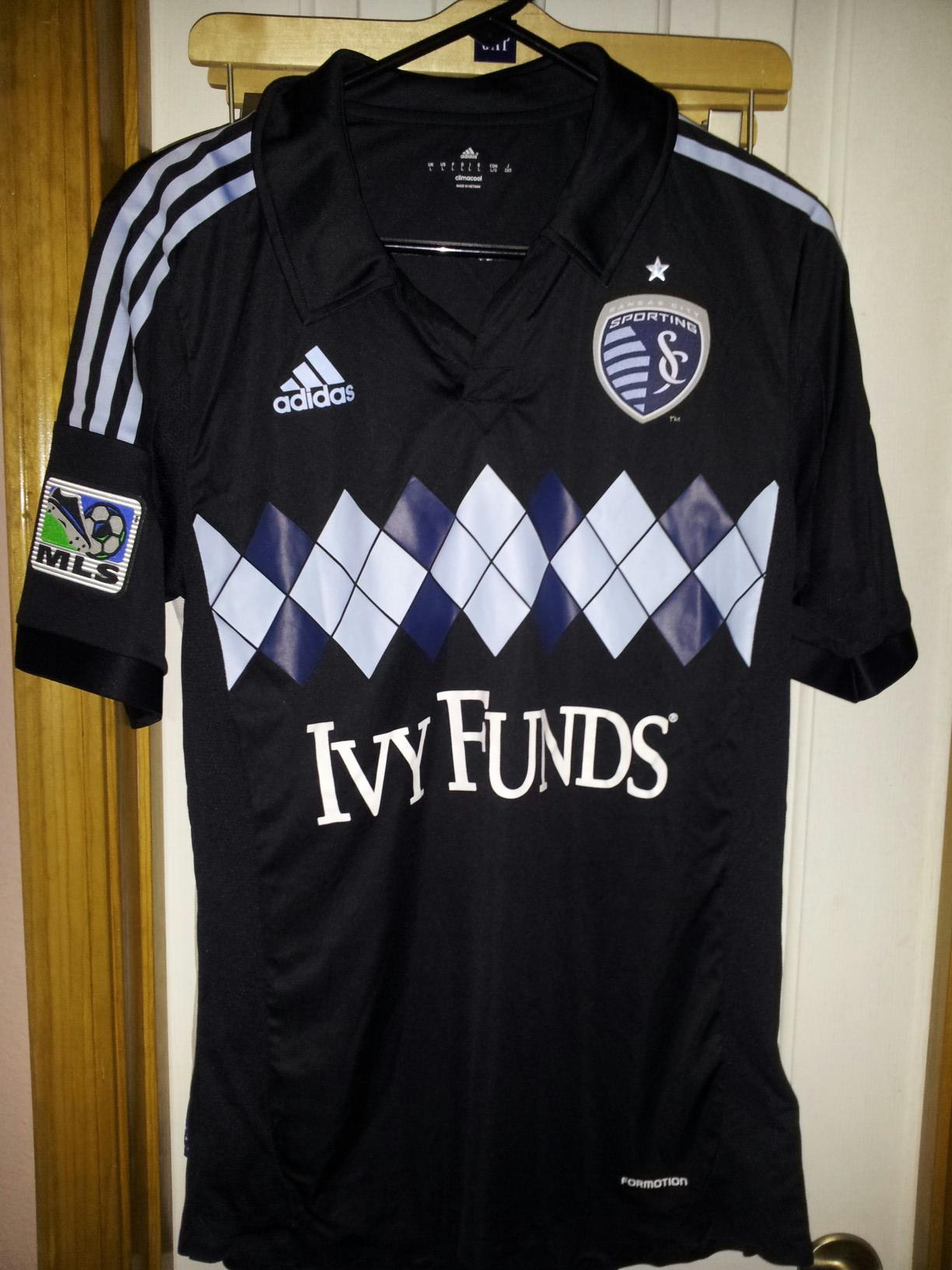
The 2013 3rd Jersey kit from Sporting Kansas City

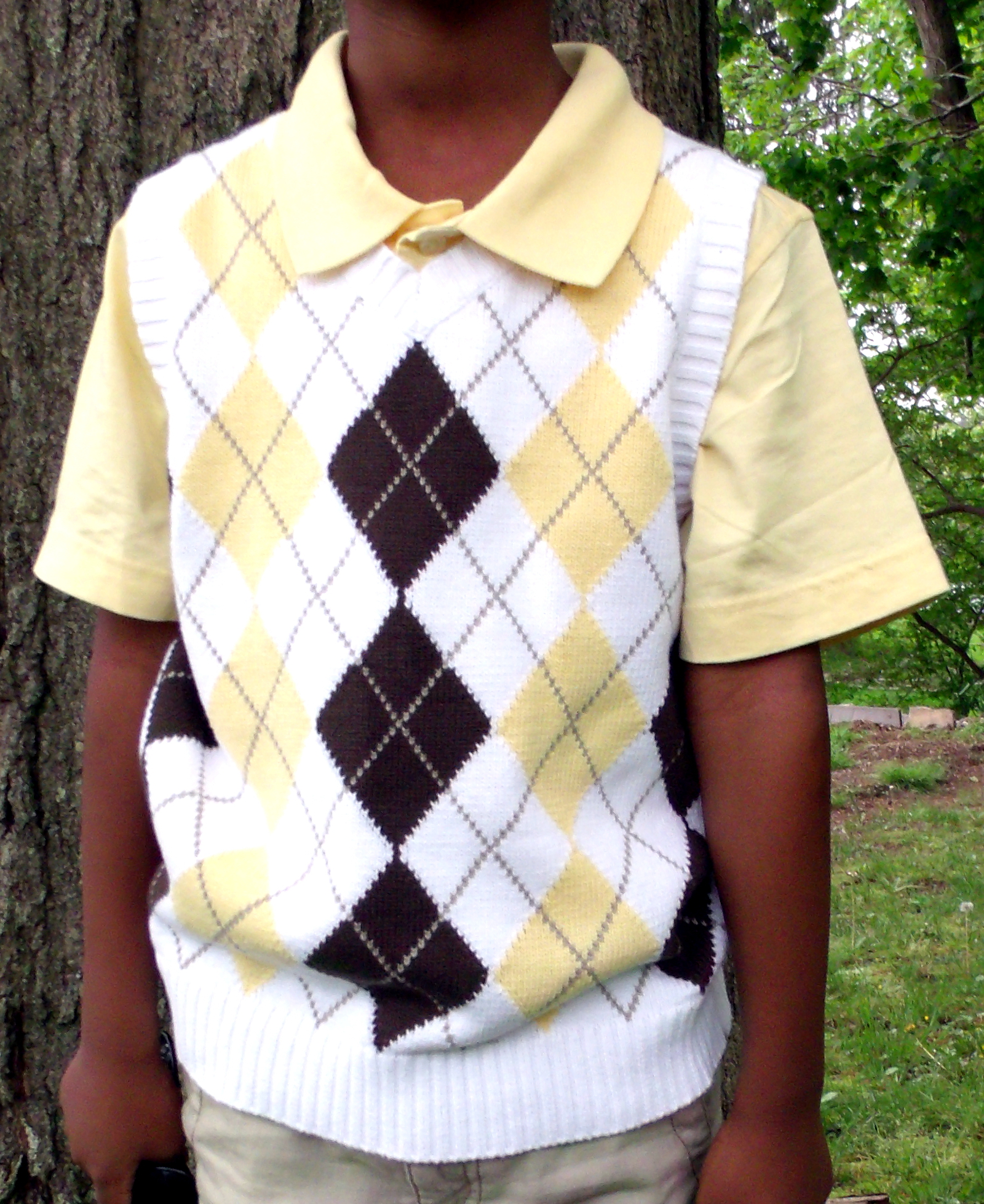
Argyle sweater vest

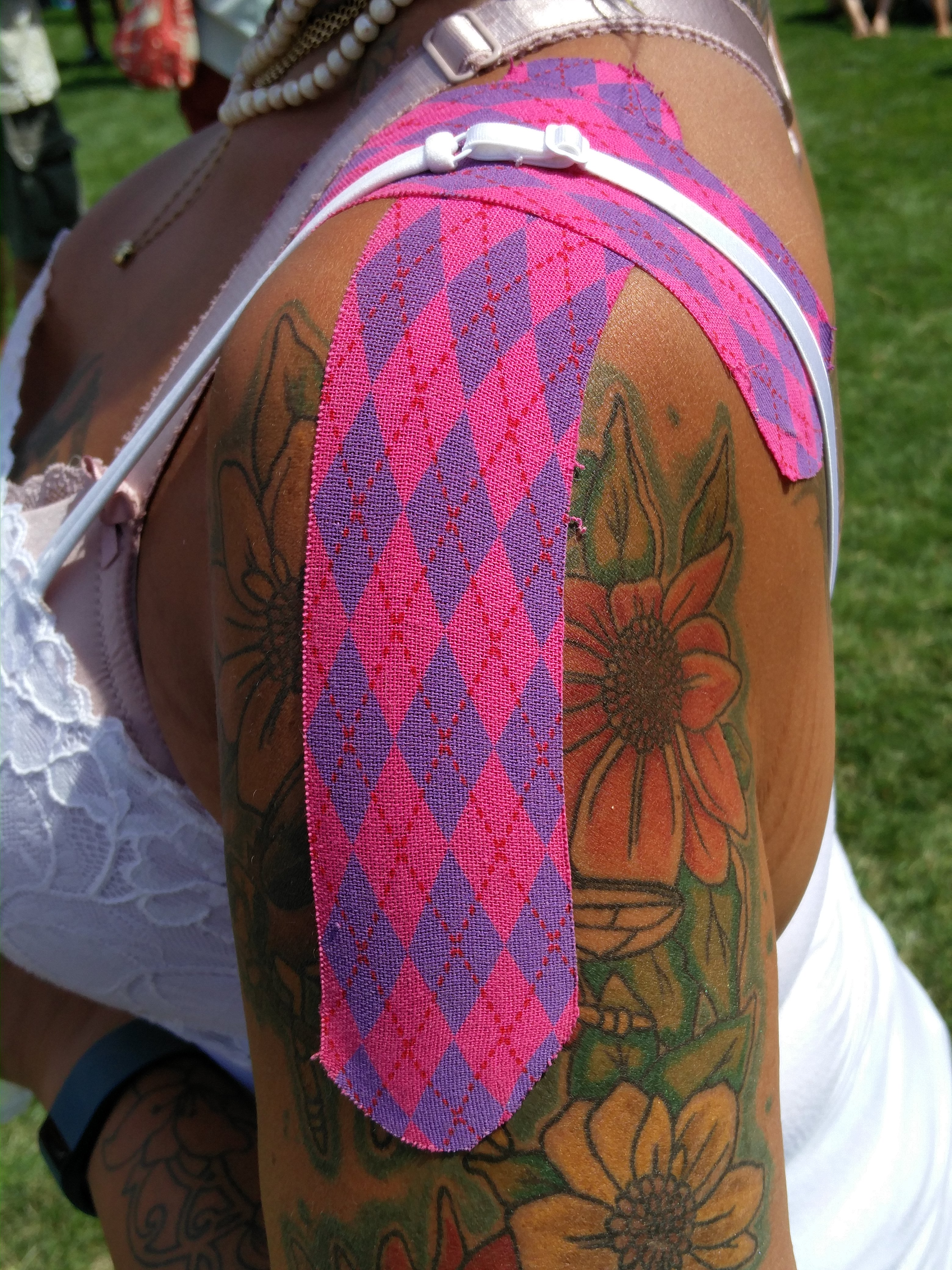
Argyle kinesiology tape

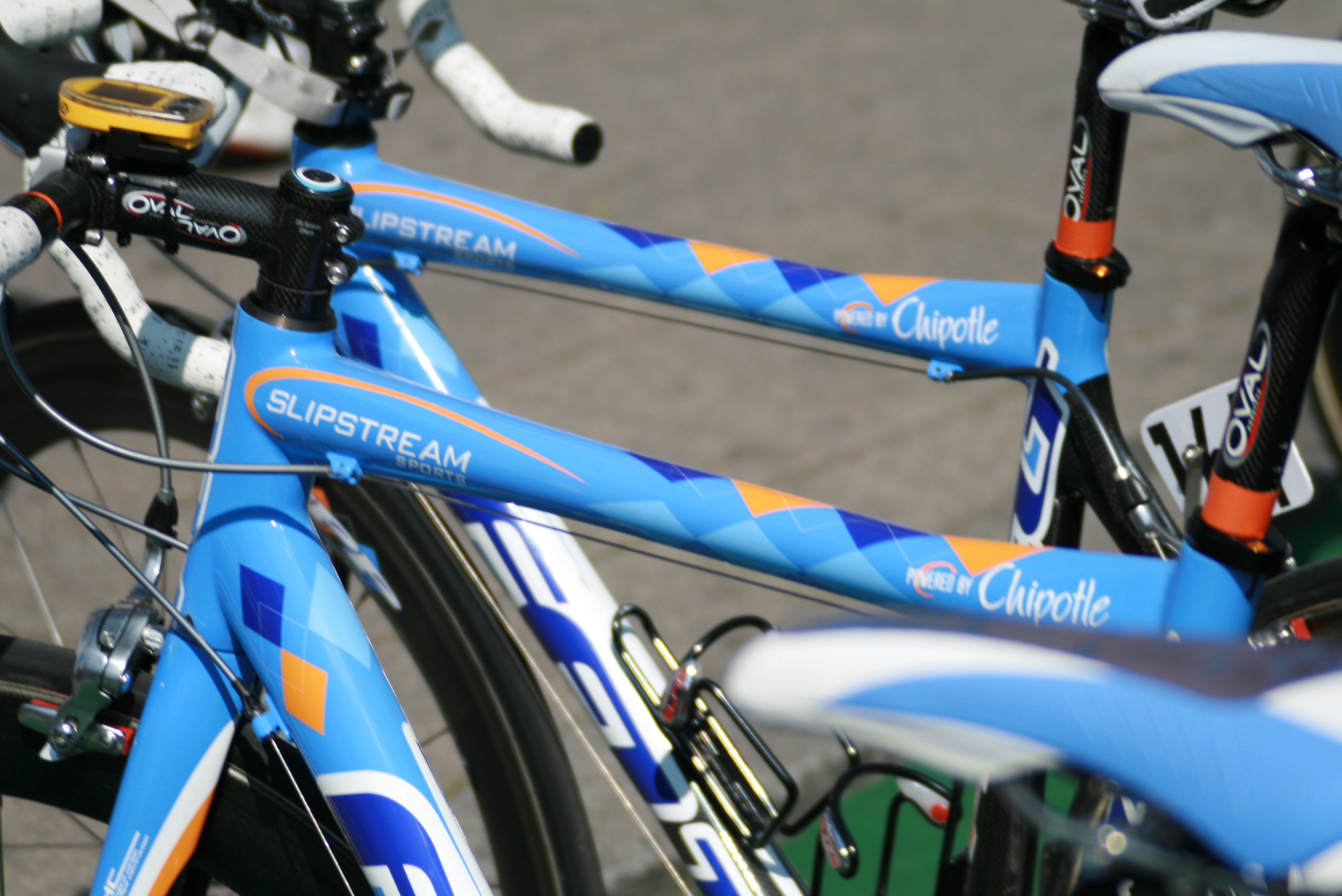
Slipstream-Chipotle's Argyle-patterned racing bikes in 2008

== See also ==
- Check (fabric)
- Flannel
- Harlequin print
- Houndstooth
- Madras (cloth)
- Plaid
- Tartan
