= Bruce Collins =

Bruce Collins may refer to:

- Bruce Dwight Collins (born 1968), American radio host and author
- Bruce Collins (basketball) (born 1958), American basketball player
