= Widow Blue! =

- VHS released by Something Weird Video
- Directed by: Walt Davis
- Written by: Walt Davis
- Produced by: Manuel Conde
- Starring: Alex Elliot; Walt Davis; Charles Lish; Rick Cassidy; John Holmes; Andy Bellamy; Susan Wescott; Sandy Dempsey
- Cinematography: Manny White
- Production company: Lolita Productions
- Release date: 1970 (United States)
- Running time: 78 minutes
- Country: United States
- Language: English

Widow Blue! (also known as Sex Psycho and The Demon in Miss Jones) is a 1970 pornographic horror film written and directed by Walt Davis and starring Alex Elliot, Walt Davis, Charles Lish, Rick Cassidy, John Holmes, Andy Bellamy, Susan Wescott, and Sandy Dempsey.

== Plot ==
Eva Blue gets high on marijuana in her living room, and falls asleep on the couch. A woman named Elise is then shown in bed with her husband, Nick, who she tries to talk into having sex with her. Nick ignores his wife's advances (not for the first time) and berates her appearance, housekeeping, and cooking before heading to a business appointment, mentioning on his way out that they have been invited to dinner at Eva Blue's house. Elise calls her lover over, and Nick buys a meat cleaver at a hardware store.

At the Blue residence, Eva's husband Jerry is having sex with his brother in-law, Marshall. After Marshall ejaculates, Nick and Eva enter the room, and Nick hacks Jerry in the throat with the cleaver, splattering blood on Eva's face. Eva sends Marshall out to get the coffin they intend to put her husband's body in, and makes a reluctant Nick have sex on the bed containing Jerry's mutilated remains, which Eva at one point fellates while riding Nick. Marshall returns with the casket, and after Jerry's corpse is placed in it, Nick forces Eva and Marshall to have sex with him on top of it.

As the trio moves the coffin, two of Eva and Jerry's swinger friends drop by unexpectedly, and insist on group sex. After the orgy, Marshall and the couple leave, and Elise (who Nick and Eva intend to kill) arrives for dinner. Eva spins a lie about getting a call from her ill mother, and pretends to leave while Nick convinces Elise to have sex in one of the bedrooms. While Elise is in the middle of performing oral sex on Nick, Eva and Marshall sneak into the room, and as they are about kill Elise with the cleaver, Elise spots them, and bites off Nick's penis in shock. As Elise chokes to death on Nick's severed genitalia, Eva and Marshall go into hysterics, and run away screaming.

Eva is then shown waking up on her couch, implying the events of the film were just a drug-fueled dream she had. As Eva goes to prepare dinner, the meat cleaver is shown lying on the floor.

== Cast ==
- Andy Bellamy as Lisa
- Rick Cassidy as Elise's Lover
- Walt Davis as Jerry Blue
- Sandy Dempsey as Elise
- Alex Elliot as Nick
- John Holmes as Ron
- Charles Lish as Marshall
- Susan Wescott as Eva Blue

== Release ==
Widow Blue! was never released theatrically it was deemed too disturbing for its time. No distributor would touch it. WB was put out very limited on VHS as Sex Psycho by Something Weird Video once again because of the deranged subject of the film SWV was threatened with shipping pornographic material over state lines, and again the film was pulled in 1995. A decade later, the company reissued the film on DVD-R, under the name The Demon in Miss Jones. In 2014, a remastered cut version of the film, this time under its original name Widow Blue!, was released on standard DVD by Vinegar Syndrome, in a triple feature with Evil Come, Evil Go and Oh! You Beautiful Doll.

== Reception ==
Widow Blue! was praised by Fred Adelman of Critical Condition, who wrote "Davis (who appears as Jerry) liked to give his audience some shock value along with the hardcore sex, but theatergoers at the time were not prepared for it. He was way ahead of his time. All of Davis's films should be re-evaluated today. He should have a cult following". Paul Freitag-Fey of Daily Grindhouse stated Widow Blue! "spirals into a blend of perversion that would make even the most hardcore genre fan blush" and "It's all ridiculous, and it would have been unwatchable if it weren't for Davis's sense of humor, resulting in a movie that seems to have been made with a John Waters-like sense of awareness as to how to deliberately revolt the audience".

Widow Blue! was described as "a completely insane hardcore gore film" by Nathaniel Thompson of Mondo Digital, who said that while the film was nowhere near good "anyone who wants to jump way in the deep end of crazed '70s cinema will really meet their match here". In a review for Rock! Shock! Pop!, Ian Jane said that it had a good cast, and that the fast-paced and quirky film's content, bad music, cheap gore, and lack of production values made it "a trash film of the highest order".

== See also ==
- List of American films of 1970
