= Carlo Masi =

Italian gay pornographic film actor

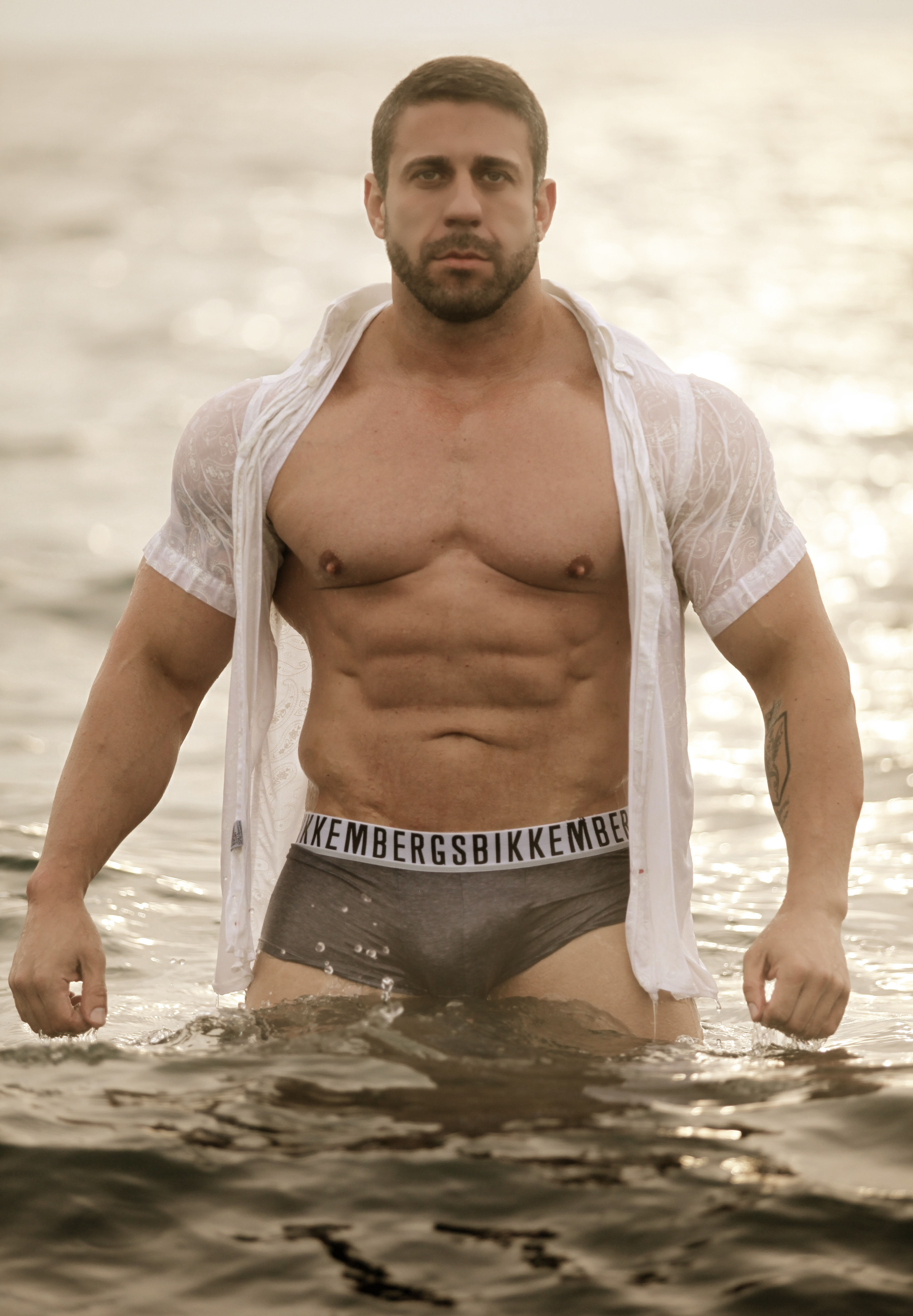
- Born: Ruggero Freddi; 6 October 1976 (age 50); Rome, Italy
- Education: Sapienza University of Rome (BS, MS, PhD)
- Other name: Carlo Masi
- Years active: 2004–2009
- Employer: COLT Studio Group
- Spouse(s): Giovanni Ravaschieri Fieschi Del Drago (m. 2015; died 2016) Gustavo Leguizamon (m. 2018)
- Scientific career
- Fields: Mathematics
- Workplaces: Sapienza University of Rome
- Thesis: Morse index of multiple blow-up solutions to the two-dimensional sinh-poisson equation (2020)
- Doctoral advisor: Angela Pistoia; Massimo Grossi

Ruggero Freddi (born 6 October 1976) is an Italian mathematics lecturer and former gay pornographic film actor known professionally as Carlo Masi. He was married to a member of the Roman noble family Del Drago, holding the title of prince, and became his widower following his husband's death.

== Early life and education ==
Freddi was born in Rome in 1976 to a poor family. His parents divorced when he was three years old. At the age of 14, he began to work out at a local gym, practicing bodybuilding assiduously. In 2002, when he was about to complete his first cycle of study at the Sapienza University of Rome, he moved to Canada, and subsequently to New York.

== Career ==
In 2003, Masi completed a Master of Science (MSc) degree in computer engineering at the Sapienza University of Rome and worked in an artificial intelligence laboratory.

=== Pornography ===
In 2004, after being contacted by a Colt Studio Group (CSG) recruiter, he made his debut in the gay pornography industry participating in his first porn movie, Big N 'Plenty. After his debut, he signed an exclusive model contract with CSG. He has advocated safe sex in some interviews, fraternising with the Italian LGBT community.

In 2006, he was selected to appear on the cover of COLT 40, a coffee table book published to celebrate the fortieth anniversary of the production company.

In 2007, Masi and his future husband, Adam Champ (Gustavo Leguizamon), were selected to appear on the cover of the Damron 2007 Men's Travel Guide.

In 2008, reportedly, CSG and Calaexotic released a dildo reproduction of Masi's penis. That same year, he was named the first and only Colt Man Emeritus and his contract was extended to a lifetime one. In 2008, Masi and Champ, were selected to appear on the cover of Adam Gay Film & Video Directory Magazine.

During his porn career, he was a guest on national Italian TV shows such as Chiambretti Night, L'Infedele and Sugo. Moreover, he was featured in several tours across America, Mexico and Europe to promote the CSG brand. His porn career lasted six years (from age 28 to 34). Following a disagreement with Colt in 2009, Masi retired from the pornography industry.

In the essay Pornage. Viaggio nei segreti e nelle ossessioni del sesso contemporaneo (Il_Saggiatore_(casa_editrice), 2018), the author devotes a passage to Ruggero Freddi, citing him as an example of a former pornographic actor who transitioned into academia.

In 2011, he was included in the anthologies Porn from Andy Warhol to X-Tube and Gay Porn Heroes: 100 Most Famous Porn Stars. In 2013, he was interviewed for the documentary HUSTLABALL BERLIN - A Documentary That Bares All. In 2014, he was included in the coffee table book produced by Colt entitled Hairy Chested Men.

=== Theatre ===
In 2009, he made his theatre debut with Senzaparole, a reinterpretation of Samuel Beckett's Act Without Words I, directed by Andrea Adriatico and staged in Bologna with the Teatri di vitatheatre company. and later in Rome at the Teatro India.

The production is documented in Non io nei giorni felici. Beckett, Adriatico e il teatro del desiderio (Titivillus_Mostre_Editoria , 2010), a volume on Adriatico’s Beckett cycle that also highlights Masi’s role as co-protagonist.

=== Academia ===
After working in the theatre, Masi decided to return to the Sapienza University of Rome. There he earned a Bachelor of Science degree (cum laude) in mathematics, with a score of 110/110 and then a Master of Science degree (cum laude) in mathematics with a score of 110/110. In 2020, he completed a Ph.D. in Mathematical Models for Engineering, Electromagnetism and Nanosciences at Sapienza University of Rome focusing on the application of Morse theory to a Dirichlet problem traced back to Poisson equations. His doctoral advisors were Angela Pistoia and Massimo Grossi.

While he was working on his doctorate, he was a lecturer for Analysis 1 and Analysis 2 courses at the Faculty of Engineering at the Sapienza University of Rome.

His works have been published in peer-reviewed journals indexed in major scientific databases, such as Analysis in Theory and Applications.

In 2020, Freddi was dismissed from Sapienza University of Rome. He stated that he believed the dismissal was related to his past career in the adult film industry. In 2023, an Italian labor court ruled in his favor, condemning the university for vexatious litigation (“lite temeraria”) and ordering it to pay damages and unpaid wages.

Freddi continues to work in artificial intelligence research and remains active in the research community, publishing in peer-reviewed journals such as Scientific Reports and Brain Stimulation and presenting at international conferences, including IJCNN 2026, held as part of the IEEE World Congress on Computational Intelligence (WCCI).

== Media attention ==
In 2017, an article published by la Repubblica revealed his past as a pornographic actor, a revelation that attracted wide international media coverage.

He has appeared on several television programs across Europe, in addition to the ones already mentioned, among them are La vida con Samanta, I fatti vostri, Pomeriggio Cinque and Tagadà. He has also been a guest on numerous radio programs, including Radio 105, Radio Colonna, and La Zanzara on Radio 24.

In 2010, he was officially announced as a permanent member of the cast of Saturday Night Live Italia but he never appeared on the show.

In 2020, writer Strega Prize winner Walter Siti published La natura è innocente – Due vite quasi vere(Rizzoli). This book is a double biography, told in alternate chapters, one of which is that of Ruggero Freddi.

== Personal life ==
In 2015, Masi married Prince Giovanni Ravaschieri Fieschi Del Drago in Porto. Del Drago died in 2016.

During his participation at Pomeriggio Cinque, he proposed to his partner, Gustavo Leguizamon. The civil union was celebrated on 4 May 2018, and was broadcast live on Pomeriggio Cinque.

== Selected videography ==
Year	Title	Studio	Director
2004	Big 'N Plenty	Colt Studios	John Rutherford
2004	Muscle Up!	Colt Studios	John Rutherford
2004	Buckleroose - Special Collectable Edition	Colt Studios	John Rutherford
2004	eXposed: The Making Of A Legend	Colt Studios	John Rutherford
2005	Minute Man 23	Colt Studios	John Rutherford
2005	Wide Strokes	Colt Studios	John Rutherford
2006	Dual: Taking it Like a Man	Colt Studios	John Rutherford
2006	Man Country	Colt Studios	John Rutherford
2006	Waterbucks 2	Colt Studios	John Rutherford
2007	Naked Muscles: The New Breed	Colt Studios	John Rutherford
2007	Hawai'i	Colt Studios	John Rutherford
2007	Paradise Found (no sex)	Buckshot Productions	Steve Landess and Kristofer Weston
2009	Hot Bods	Colt Studios	John Rutherford
2009	MuscleHeads	Colt Studios	John Rutherford
2010	Colt Icon: Luke Garrett	Colt Studios	John Rutherford
2014	Top Shots	Colt Studios	John Rutherford
2014	Top Shots 3	Colt Studios	John Rutherford

== Awards ==
Year	Award	Category	Film	Partnered	Result
2005	GayVN Award	Best Sex Scene	Big 'N Plenty (2004)	Karim	Nominee
2006	HeatGay Award	Best Actor	–	–	Won
2008	XBIZ Award	LGBT Performer of the Year	–	–	Nominee
2008	GayVN Award	Best Sex Scene	Naked Muscles: The New Breed (2007)	Tom Chase	Nominee

== See also ==
- LGBT people in science
- List of actors in gay pornographic films
