= Walter Siti =

Italian writer

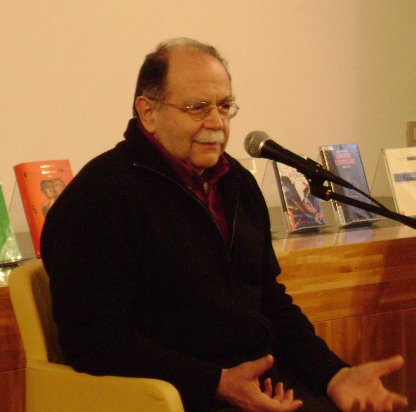
- Siti in 2008
- Born: 20 May 1947 (age 79); Modena, Italy
- Occupation: Writer

Walter Siti (born 20 May 1947) is an Italian novelist, essayist, literary critic and academic. He has won numerous literary awards, including the Strega Prize.

== Life and career ==
Born in Modena, Siti graduated from the University of Pisa and got a doctorate from the Scuola Normale Superiore di Pisa. He served as professor of contemporary Italian literature at the University of Pisa, University of Cosenza and University of L'Aquila. He made his literary debut as a critic, writing essays on Pier Paolo Pasolini, Sandro Penna and Eugenio Montale, among others.

In 1994, Siti released his first novel, Scuola di nudo ("Nude School"). His 2008 novel The Contagion ('Il contagio') was adapted into a film, Tainted Souls. In 2013, his novel Resistere non serve a niente ("Resisting serves no purpose") won the Strega Prize and the Mondello Prize. In 2020 his dual biography La natura è innocente (“Nature is Innocent”), recounting the lives of Ruggero Freddi and Filippo Addamo, won the Premio Flaiano.. His 2021 essay Riflessioni sul Bene in letteratura ("Reflections on the Good in Literature") won the Viareggio Prize.

Siti also worked as a television writer and a television critic for the newspaper La Stampa.
