= Jim French (photographer) =

American erotic photograher (1932–2017)

- 2004, oil on linen by Adrian Gottlieb
- Born: James Thomas French; July 14, 1932; Beaver Falls, Pennsylvania, USA
- Died: June 16, 2017 (aged 84); Palm Springs, California, USA
- Education: Philadelphia Museum School of Art
- Known for: Illustration; drawing; photography; film

Jim French (born James Thomas French, July 14, 1932 – June 16, 2017) was an American artist, illustrator, photographer, filmmaker, and publisher. He is best known for his association with Colt Studio, which he, using the pseudonym Rip Colt, created together with business partner Lou Thomas in late 1967. Thomas parted from the endeavor in 1974 leaving French to continue to build what would become one of the most successful gay male erotica companies in the U.S.

French left a legacy of homoerotic images in artwork, illustrations, photo sets, slides, film, fine-art photographs, magazines, books and calendars that presented his work exclusively and set a new standard in photography of men.

French began drawing and photographing male erotica in the mid-1960s while working as an illustrator and artist for Madison Avenue advertising agencies. His first published book, Man, was issued in 1972. It was one of the first photo books of homoerotic full frontal nudes ever. Other books include Another Man, Jim French Men, Quorum, Opus Deorum, Masc., The Art of Jim French and The Art of the Male Nude. Publication of Colt magazines began in 1969 with the digest-size "Manpower!". During the 1970s, French began marketing his short films in 8mm format; they were soon collected on video-cassette format, which were remastered for DVD format in the 1990s.

French's artwork and photography has been hailed as “iconic, groundbreaking, and singularly influential.” Victor Skrebneski writes in his introduction to the monograph Opus Deorum: "Jim French, master photographer, demonstrates controlled intensity and passion for his work. His images bridge time, lock memory, fire provocation. That is his art."

French died in his home in Palm Springs, California, at age 84.

== Early life ==
French was formally trained at the Philadelphia Museum School of Art from 1950 to 1954 and went on active duty in the United States Army in 1955, having been in the reserves for two years prior to his enlisting. He was honorably discharged from the service in 1957.

French settled in New York and pursued a successful career as an illustrator and artist for Madison Avenue advertising agencies. His work appeared in advertisements for Neiman Marcus and other high-end department stores. He also created designs for textiles for the noted designer, Tamis Keefe.

French also created a number of portrait drawings for use as album art for Columbia Records. Those portraits included Barbra Streisand, Frank Sinatra, Johnny Mathis, and Maria Callas.

== Lüger Studio ==
At the suggestion of an Army contact who had seen some of his early unpublished homoerotic drawings done under the name Arion, he and French formed a partnership to start a mail order company named "The Lüger Studio." "Kurt Lüger" became the pseudonym for French. The name was chosen for its implied association with the German Luger pistol. "Lüger" is also the German word for "liar".

While the Arion drawings had been playful sketches of Fire Island life and similar scenes (influenced by two of his favorite artists, George Petty and Alberto Vargas), the drawings created as "Lüger" featured more hypermasculine subjects: construction men, men in leather, surfers, cowboys, wrestlers, and sailors. The first appearance of a Lüger Studio drawing (two drawings from his "Cowboy" series) was in the May–June 1966 issue of The Young Physique. Photographic copies of the drawing sets were offered for purchase through mail order and were advertised in various magazines available at the time: The Young Physique, Mars, Muscleboy, Sir Gee, Male Classics, and Fizeek Art Quarterly. These copies were offered as thematic sets of either six or eight drawings. Lüger Studios also produced four different photographic sets of various male models.

To avoid legal troubles, Lüger Studio offerings contained minimal frontal nudity but were nonetheless erotic and humorously creative in their suggestiveness. French's artwork was favorably received and was commended for its "unbridled imagination and a fantastic technique."

== Colt Studio ==
Eventually French's partner bought out his share of Lüger Studio, freeing French and a new partner, Lou Thomas, to establish another business called Colt Studio (a reference to American west firearm imagery, although the company soon adopted a logo of a stallion.) Having worked for nearly a year to produce the first drawings and photographs to be offered by the new company, Colt was begun in late 1967. Once more the images were offered in sets of prints by mail and the company quickly became successful. But after fifteen years in New York, often traveling to California to take advantage of the weather and abundance of models, French decided to move west.

In 1974 he bought out his partner's share of the business leaving Lou Thomas to start his own company (Target Studio). French made his home in the Hollywood Hills. From the Colt Studio offices in San Fernando Valley, he continued to run the most successful male physique photography company in America, marketing his work to gay men. For thirty-six years, Colt Studio offered the highest quality male erotica commercially available.

During his career, French worked with over 830 models. Among them were Bruno, Ledermeister, Chris Dickerson, George O’Mara, John Tristram, Alan Albert, Bernie Booth, Dakota, Stoner, Erron, John Pruitt, Gordon Grant, Bruno, Jake Tanner, Jim Morris, Mike Davis, Nick Chase, Mike Betts, Rick Wolfmier, Pat Sutton, Andreas Stock, Danny Collier, Ed Dinakos, Billy Herrington, Franco Corelli, JD Amos, Doug Perry, Tony Romano, Ken Ryker, Tom Chase, Tony Ganz, Steve Kelso, Pete Kuzak, Carl Hardwick, and Wade Neff. French was the first to photograph Drew Okun also providing him with his professional name, “Al Parker.”

In 2003, French sold Colt Studio to former Falcon Studios director John Rutherford and his business partner Tom Settle. The rebranded company, "Colt Studio Group," continues to operate, adding new content, but with digital rights to the drawings, photographs, and films created by French.

== Plagiarism of work ==
One illustration of French's, entitled 'Longhorns - Dance', achieved worldwide notoriety when it was appropriated by the late Sex Pistols manager and fashion designer Malcolm McLaren in 1975 as the basis for artwork for a T-shirt sold through Sex, the King's Road boutique McLaren operated with Vivienne Westwood.

Depicting two cowboys facing each other, each naked from the waist down apart from their boots, 'Longhorns – Dance' was initially sold as one of a pack of six 5″ x 7″ prints in 1969. Reproduced in the book The Colt Album, published in Britain by John S. Barrington in 1973, its appearance in issue 7 of French's magazine Manpower!, published in 1974, piqued McLaren's interest when he acquired a copy in a shop on Christopher Street in Greenwich Village.

McLaren added imagined dialogue between the two figures to express “the frustration and boredom I felt at the time”. Alan Jones, a friend of McLaren's, was the first person to wear the design in public, and was promptly arrested and charged with “showing an obscene print in a public place” under the Vagrancy Act of 1824.

The following day Sex was raided by the police, who impounded shirts bearing the design. Indecency charges were levelled at McLaren. The uproar became a freedom of speech issue when Labour MP Colin Phipps called on Home Secretary Roy Jenkins to review the outmoded law. “It would appear to me to be more logical for a prosecutor to have to demonstrate a specific public hurt in matters of taste rather than being able to rely on antique laws,” Phipps wrote to Jenkins.

Despite the outcry, Jones was fined and McLaren was arraigned to appear in court and was also later fined.

Subsequently, when the 'Cowboys' T-shirt was worn by members of the Sex Pistols such as Sid Vicious, French's illustration became one of the key visual provocations of the punk movement, though French was not impressed when Westwood continued to reproduce the image with McLaren's dialogue.

In 2011, French's spokesman Nat Gozzano told blogger Paul Gorman: “The whole drawing was simply jacked. The illustration was drawn by Jim French well before McLaren and Westwood made a whole bunch of money (and still do apparently) stealing it.”

== State of Man publications ==
French published eight volumes of fine art male photography under his own publishing imprint, State of Man.

- Man (1972)
- Another Man (1974)
- Quorum (1976)
- The Art of Jim French: the Nude Male (1989)
- Men (1990)
- Opus Deorum (1992)
- The Art of the Male Nude (1993)
- Masc.: The Color Photography of Jim French (1999)

== Other publications ==
Felix Lance Falkon, A Historic Collection of Gay Art (San Diego: Greenleaf Classics, 1972.) Although mistakenly identifying the work as by “Jacques,” Falkon concluded his text with two drawings by French along with the effusive comment that [French] "is probably the best artist ever to work in the field of homoerotica."

Like A Moth To A Flame (New York: Little Bear Press, 2003.) A collection of early 1970s photographs by French of the model, David Scrivanek. Scrivanek's nom-de-porn was “Erron.”

Robert Mainardi, editor, and Jim French, Jim French Diaries: The Creator of Colt Studio (Berlin: Bruno Gmünder, 2011.) A large volume with substantial information regarding the life and work of French.

Tinker, Tailor, Soldier, Sailor: Jim French Polaroids (New York: Antinous Press, 2013.) A collection of French's 1960s and early 1970s Polaroid photographs. Accompanied by a very brief text, the volume was published in conjunction with an exhibition of the same name at the gallery, ClampArt, New York.

Ian Berry and Jack Shear, Borrowed Light: Selections from the Jack Shear Collection (Saratoga Springs, New York: The Frances Young Tang Teaching Museum, 2017.) Includes photographs by French.

Paul Martineau and Ryan Linkof, Queer Lens: A History of Photography (J. Paul Getty Museum: Los Angeles, 2025.)

== Exhibitions ==
- The Galleria: a Collection of Physique Art. The Studio Bookshop, New York, 1969. See advertisement in "The Silent Men 4" (NY: Times Square Studio) 1969. French's drawings were included with the work of others in this early exhibition of gay erotica.
- Jim French: Still Point. Wessel + O'Connor Fine Art, New York, June 2 - July 9, 1994. Black and white photographs of the male figure taken by French between 1968 and 1994. See “Art Exhibitions,” New York Magazine 27:23 (6 June 1994): 80.
- Jim French: Masc. Wessel + O’Connor Fine Art, New York, June 26 - August 27, 1999.
- Appearances: Photographic Portraits. Wessel + O’Connor Fine Art, New York, September - October 2001. French's work was included alongside of the work of Horst P. Horst, Blake Little, George Platt Lynes, Robert Mapplethorpe, and others.
- The Photography of Punk. SHOWStudio, London, November 2013. French exhibited both drawings and Polaroid photography as context to the 1975 appropriation (by Malcolm McLaren and Vivienne Westwood) of his erotic cowboy imagery. The show was curated by Nick Knight.
- Photography by the Legendary Jim French Woodman/Shimko Gallery, Palm Springs, CA, November 1–21, 2013
- Tinker, Tailor, Soldier, Sailor: Polaroids by Jim French. ClampArt, New York, November 21 – December 21, 2013. Featured French's original 1960s Polaroid photography.
- Classical Nudes and the Making of Queer History Leslie-Lohman Museum, New York NY, October 17, 2013 – January 4, 2014. Featured artists include James Bidgood, Michelangelo Buonarroti, Paul Cadmus, F. Holland Day, Jim French, Jean Jacques Pradier, William von Gloeden, Nan Goldin, Robert Mapplethorpe and Lyle Ashton Harris.
- STROKE: From Under the Mattress to the Museum Walls Leslie-Lohman Museum, New York NY, March 28 – May 25, 2014. Featured artists included Neel Bate (Blade), Michael Breyette, Michael Broderick, Harry Bush, Jim French (Colt), Oliver Frey, Kevin King (BEAU), Michael Kirwan, Touko Laaksonen (Tom of Finland), Antonio Lopez (Antonio), David Martin, Donald Merrick (Domino), Kent Neffendorf (Kent), Olaf Odegaard (Olaf), Mel Odom, Dominic Orejudos (Etienne), Benoît Prévot, George Stavrinos, Rex, Robert W. Richards, Richard Rosenfeld, William Schmelling (Hun), George Quaintance and Frank Webber (Bastille).
- Jim French Before Colt. Nat Reed Gallery, Palm Springs CA, May 17 - June 20, 2014. Featured examples of French's 1950s and 1960s commercial artwork including early illustrative and design work for such clients as Columbia Records and fabric house Tammis Keefe
- Jim French. Wessel + O’Connor Fine Art, Lambertville, NJ, May 17 - July 13, 2014. Featured French's original 1960s Polaroid photography.
- Sex Crimes. ClampArt, New York, August 15 – September 28, 2019. Included French's original 1960s Polaroid photography.
- AllTogether. Tom of Finland Foundation (USA) and The Community (France.) Studio Cannaregio (Venice, April 22 - June 26, 2022) and The Community Centre (Paris, May 9 - June 26, 2022.) The exhibition features two important early works of French.
- Queer Lens: A History of Photography. Getty Center (Los Angeles, June 17 - September 28, 2025.) Included a display of pages from albums of his 1960-1970s Polaroid photography assembled by French for his personal collection.

== Later life ==
In 2013, French relocated to Palm Springs, California. He continued to offer limited edition art prints from his photographic archives as well as original Polaroid photographs taken as studies for his drawings.

French died at home at age 84. He is survived by husband Jeffery Turner.

== See also ==
- Tom of Finland
