= Jester blouse =

The jester blouse was a popular item in 1950s and early 1960s women's fashion. Fashion designer Louella Ballerino found an illustration of a court jester which inspired her to design her "sun and fun" fashions. The jester theme appeared in long pointed collars tipped with bell-like buttons, harlequin prints, and in the jagged points which occasionally outlined an apron overskirt. Ballerino created plunged-to-the-waist jester blouses in cotton or wool jersey topped sun backed dresses.

== Popularity ==
In March 1961 Scotties sold a jester shirt made by Cromwell Mills at Bloomingdales and Filene's, It was red, white, and blue in color. The jester blouse often featured a nautical theme as with some patterns illustrated in the July 27, 1950 Washington Post. In these fashions young girls frolic attired in change-about four way dresses, nautically styled. At Bullock's in downtown Los Angeles, mother-daughter jester collar blouses were advertised as "the new big collar look", in December 1962.

== Style revival ==
The "Pierrot" look for women became popular in Paris, France in 1979. The look featured "court jester" blouses as part of the trend. The blouses were worn together with tasseled shoes in bold checkerboard squares.
