= Bob Birdsong =

American bodybuilder

- professional bodybuilder

Personal info
- Born: 1948; Tennessee, U.S.

Best statistics
- Height: 5 ft 8 in (1.73 m)

Professional (Pro) career
- Pro-debut: AAU Mr. Los Angeles; 1973
- Best win: IFBB Mr. America; 1974
- Predecessor: Lou Ferrigno
- Successor: Robby Robinson
- Active: 1971–89

Bob Birdsong (born 1948) is a former American bodybuilder. He competed in several IFBB and AAU bodybuilding contests, and won a number of important titles in the 1970s, including the 1974 IFBB Mr. America.

Born in Tennessee, Birdsong first competed in the 1971 AAU Mr. America coming in 21st. He followed by competing in contests, such as AAU Mr. California, AAU Mr. Western America, and IFBB Mr. International.

== Early life ==
Birdsong was born in Tennessee and raised in Kentucky. He described himself as a "skinny and stuttering kid" growing up. As a child, he got bullied by other children because of the name "Birdsong" and his body. At the age of fourteen, Birdsong first became interested in bodybuilding. He later attended Art Center College of Design in Pasadena, California where he studied fine art. He also tried his hand at modeling when he was photographed for Colt Studios circa early 1970s

== Contest history ==
- 1973 AAU Mr. Los Angeles
- 1973 Mr. Pacific Coast
- 1974 IFBB Mr. America
- 1975 IFBB Pro Mr. Universe
- 1975 IFBB Pro World Championships
