= Bruce Dwight Collins =

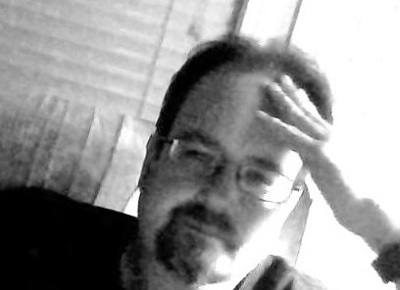
- Born: April 13, 1968 (age 56); San Jose, CA
- Occupation(s): AM radio host, author, former pro wrestling promoter

Bruce Dwight Collins (born April 13, 1968) is an American AM radio host, author, former pro wrestling promoter, and a nationally syndicated (84 AM radio markets) book reviewer (Monster Radio) from 2003-2005. Bruce has hosted The Bruce Collins Show since 2006 with co-host Chad Miles (a former candidate for a seat in the U.S. House of Representatives in Michigan's 14th congressional district) on WSMN 1590 AM in Nashua, New Hampshire, and WWZN 1510 AM in Boston, Massachusetts. Recently, The Bruce Collins Show has been broadcasting at WWPR 1490 AM in Tampa Bay/Bradenton, Florida, on Thursday nights at 10 pm EST.

== Author ==
Collins is the author of three books, among them: The Big Schwag's Positive Self Help Guide- For Complete Losers Like You!, co-written with actor Brett "The Big Schwag" Wagner, and So, You Want to be a Wrestling Promoter? co-written with Ric Drasin, the only book on Amazon about promoting wrestling (wrestling promoters are very secretive about their techniques as revealing them creates more competition). Collins is currently working on a fourth book, tentatively titled The Corpse Wrestled at Midnight.

== Pro wrestling promotions ==
Collins owned the pro wrestling company Boreman's Wrestling Planet from 1996 to 1999. Boreman's Wrestling Planet promoted shows in Northern California, most notably hosting Halloween Horror '99 at the San Jose Civic Auditorium. Bruce's time in wrestling was chronicled in SF Weekly, in an article titled SMACKDOWN!

== Radio ==
Bruce started in radio on Monster Radio, hosted by Brett "The Big Schwag" Wagner (who was the voice of Discovery Channel's Monster Garage) and Alan Taylor (also of Car and Driver Radio). Monster Radio was syndicated in 84 radio markets. Collins appeared on Monster Radio from 2003 to 2005 with his book review segments.

During this time, Collins' book review words appeared on the back cover of the bestselling book Nephilim Stargates: The Year 2012 and the Return of the Watchers by Tom Horn: "A ride of fright, discovery and action… that might have put the late Mr. Hitchcock in the fetal position."

Chad Miles, the co-host of The Bruce Collins Show, appeared on the nationally syndicated Coast to Coast AM with George Noory to represent The Bruce Collins Show and talk about drones over Miami. Based on his AM radio exposure, Collins was approached by the History Channel's Decoded TV (with bestselling author Brad Meltzer) in 2009 to audition for their program. The Bruce Collins Show uses the tagline "The New Theater of the Mind", because many of their segments are scripted and staged, although the guest interviews are, for the most part, legitimate.

The Bruce Collins Show originally started as a focus on more fringe topics (paranormal, supernatural, UFOs) but then gradually became more mainstream.

Past guests include Jesse Ventura (twice), Kevin Trudeau, Gerald Celente, Alex Jones, Larry Pratt of Gun Owners of America, Stryper's Michael Sweet, Megadeth's Dave Ellefson, Nick Redfern, Coast to Coast AM's John B. Wells, wrestling legends Ivan Koloff and Jake "The Snake" Roberts, women's wrestler Gail Kim, wrestler Drew Galloway, Machine Gun Preacher Sam Childers, Jerome Corsi, former Major League ballplayer John Rocker, former NFL player Brian Kinchen and many others.

Vocal talent Gabe Reed appears on The Bruce Collins Show regularly as multiple characters: Collin S. Collins, Jeckleberry Dupont, Sr., etc.

Bruce was a guest on Steve Bonnenberger's nationally syndicated radio show to talk about how dreams come true: how a pro wrestling promoter turned into an author and became a radio host on multiple AM stations.

Bruce Collins/The Bruce Collins Show are credited at the end of the documentary Predictive Programming & Human Microchipping Agenda in the rolling credits: "The Following Radio and TV Shows who have Promoted our Movement: -Bruce Collins Radio Show".

== Family ==
Bruce is the grandson of the late Rev. Clair Boreman, a pastor in the Foursquare Church denomination for over 50 years. Bruce's great uncle was J.W. Ruby, the former owner of Sterling Faucet Company. (The JW Ruby Memorial Hospital at West Virginia University is dedicated to him.) Bruce is a Christian. Bruce's father was Dwight Collins, a safety engineer for IBM. Bruce's mother is Roberta Boreman (Collins).
