= Joe Gold =

American bodybuilder and businessman (1922–2004)

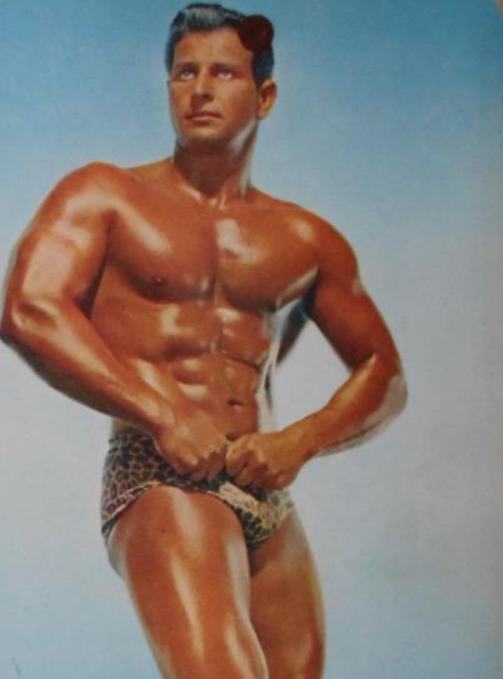
- Gold in 1954
- Born: Sidney Gold; March 10, 1922; East Los Angeles, California, U.S.
- Died: July 11, 2004 (aged 82); Marina del Rey, California, U.S.
- Occupations: Bodybuilder and businessman
- Known for: Founder of Gold's Gym and World Gym

Joe Gold (born Sidney Gold; March 10, 1922 – July 11, 2004) was an American bodybuilder and businessman. He was the founder of Gold's Gym and World Gym. He has been credited with being the father of the bodybuilding and the fitness craze.

== Early life ==
Joe Gold was the youngest of four siblings, Robert Gold (born Ruben Gold), Nathan Gold and Eunice Gold Fiss. His parents, Max Gold (born Abraham Mordechai Goldglejt) and Jennie Gold Glick Sussman (born Zelda Feierman) were both Jewish emigrants having relocated from Belarus to Boyle Heights, Los Angeles. His mother had been born in Turov, Belarus and his father in Indura. Max Gold was the neighborhood junk collector and the family's back yard and garage served as a makeshift junk yard. His mother, Jennie, was a seamstress who divorced Joe's father and remarried twice. Joe attended Theodore Roosevelt High School.

He developed an interest in bodybuilding at the age of 12, when he saw his sister-in-law's design for strengthening her arms. She had attached a filled bucket to each end of a broom handle and was using them as lifts. Joe and his brother, Robert Gold, got the idea for building their own equipment from scrap obtained from their father's scrap yard in Boyle Heights. As a teenager he headed for Muscle Beach in Santa Monica.

== Military service ==
A machinist, he worked in the United States Merchant Marine and served in the United States Navy during World War II, where he was badly injured in a torpedo strike. He also served in the Korean War.

== Career ==
As a professional bodybuilder, he auditioned for Mae West with a group of musclemen. West approved, saying "I'll take all of you." Gold subsequently toured the country with her revue. He also appeared as an extra in two epic movies, The Ten Commandments and Around the World in 80 Days, both released in 1956.

In 1965, Joe Gold opened the first Gold's Gym in Venice, California. It quickly became a landmark for local bodybuilders despite the dirty fixtures of its first incarnation. Joe Gold was known for the personal encouragement he gave trainers, although delivered in sarcastic jabs at their faults.

Among Joe Gold's many devotees was Arnold Schwarzenegger, who began working out at the gym in 1968 soon after arriving in the US, saying that Gold let him work out for free because he had no money. Schwarzenegger called Gold "a trusted friend and father figure." In 1991, when Gold fell ill, Schwarzenegger ran World Gym for him for a year or two until he was better.

Joe Gold opened new gyms and designed the equipment for them. His innovations revolutionized the sport, enabling people to exercise more easily with machines. He sold the Gold's Gym chain in 1970.

In 1977, he launched World Gym in Santa Monica (later in Marina del Rey), which he owned and operated until his death.

== Death and legacy ==
Joe died on July 11, 2004, at age 82, in Marina del Rey. The first Joe Gold Lifetime Achievement Award was presented to Ric Drasin at the 2012 World Gym International Convention in Las Vegas, Nevada.

== See also ==
- List of male professional bodybuilders
