= World Gym =

American-founded and now Taiwan-headquartered global fitness chain

World Gym International LLC
- Type: Public
- Traded as: TWSE: 2762
- Genre: Physical fitness
- Founded: 1976; 50 years ago
- Founder: Joe Gold
- Headquarters: California (to 2024); Taichung, Taiwan (2024–present)
- Number of locations: 297 (2025)
- Revenue: NT$11 billion (2025)
- Net income: NT$409 million (2025)
- Website: www.worldgym.com

World Gym International LLC is an American fitness center founded in 1976 by Joe Gold during the glory days of "Muscle Beach" in Venice Beach, California. Joe Gold is also the founder of Gold's Gym, another unaffiliated gym chain, which he sold in 1973. The gym was often frequented by celebrities and famous bodybuilders such as Arnold Schwarzenegger, Lou Ferrigno, Dave Draper and Franco Columbu.

In March 2021, World Gym said it had over 200 franchises across six continents. Owned by the Cammilleri family since 2009, its plans included further global expansion of the franchise network and the opening of regional flagship gyms. In October 2024, World Gym Taiwan acquired World Gym International.

== History ==
Joe Gold started Gold's Gym in 1965. Many world-famous bodybuilders trained there. Gold sold the gym in 1973 and went back out to sea as a sea merchant. When he came back, he regretted that he had also sold the rights to his name. Since he could not use "Gold" in its name, he opened a new gym in Santa Monica under the name of World Gym. Joe sold his World Gym in the valley to a bodybuilder named Steve Davis, who later sold it for $25,000. Gold moved his Santa Monica World Gym to Venice, then to Marina Del Rey, and the location closed after he died in 2004. World Gym had been owned by the Cammilleri family since 2009.

Joe Gold's gym was where Arnold Schwarzenegger built and sculpted himself when he first came to America. Schwarzenegger has been California's governor, a movie actor, and a former Mr Olympia. For the film Pumping Iron, released in 1977, Schwarzenegger's training was recorded in Joe's gym. Peter Brockway said in an interview that the gym earned $20 million before expenses.

In 2019, the company opened a new gym in Sherbrooke, a city located in Quebec.

In October 2024, World Gym Taiwan announced its acquisition of parent company World Gym International for US$9 million.

== Products and services ==
World Gym International offer products for workout gear such as sports bags, water bottles, nutrition products, accessories, gym clothing and apparel. There are also franchise opportunities available at World Gym International. World Gym International offers gymnasium services, equipment for fitness and physical exercise, fitness and exercise facilities, exercise classes, fitness and nutrition seminars, personal training in nutrition, exercise and fitness, training in fitness, mixed martial arts, boxing and kickboxing. World Gym International also holds exhibitions or contests for athletics, bodybuilding and mixed martial arts.

== List of countries ==
Over 200 franchised locations in over 20 countries and territories

- Australia
- Brazil
- Canada
- China
- Costa Rica
- Egypt
- Cayman Islands
- Germany
- Guatemala
- Hong Kong
- India
- Lebanon
- Macao
- Mexico
- Pakistan
- Philippines
- Russia
- Saudi Arabia
- South Korea
- Taiwan
- United Kingdom
- United States

== Joe Gold Lifetime Achievement Award ==
The first Joe Gold Lifetime Achievement Award was presented to Ric Drasin at the 2012 World Gym International Convention in Las Vegas, Nevada.

Year	Joe Gold Lifetime Achievement Award
2015	Mike Uretz
2014	Jim Brown
2013	Lou Ferrigno
2012	Ric Drasin

== See also ==
- List of companies of Taiwan
