= Gold's Gym =

American chain of international fitness centers

Gold's Gym International, Inc.
- Type: Subsidiary
- Genre: Fitness
- Founded: August 25, 1965; 61 years ago in Venice Beach, California, U.S.
- Founder: Joe Gold
- Headquarters: Dallas, Texas, U.S.
- Number of locations: ~660 (2021)
- Area served: Worldwide (36 countries)
- Parent: RSG Group
- Website: goldsgym.com

Gold's Gym International, Inc. is an American chain of international co-ed fitness centers (commonly referred to as gyms) originally started by Joe Gold in Venice Beach, California. Each gym offers a variety of cardio and strength training equipment as well as group exercise programs. Gold's Gym's is headquartered in Dallas, Texas and is owned by German fitness company RSG Group.

== History ==
Gold's Gym in Round Rock, Texas

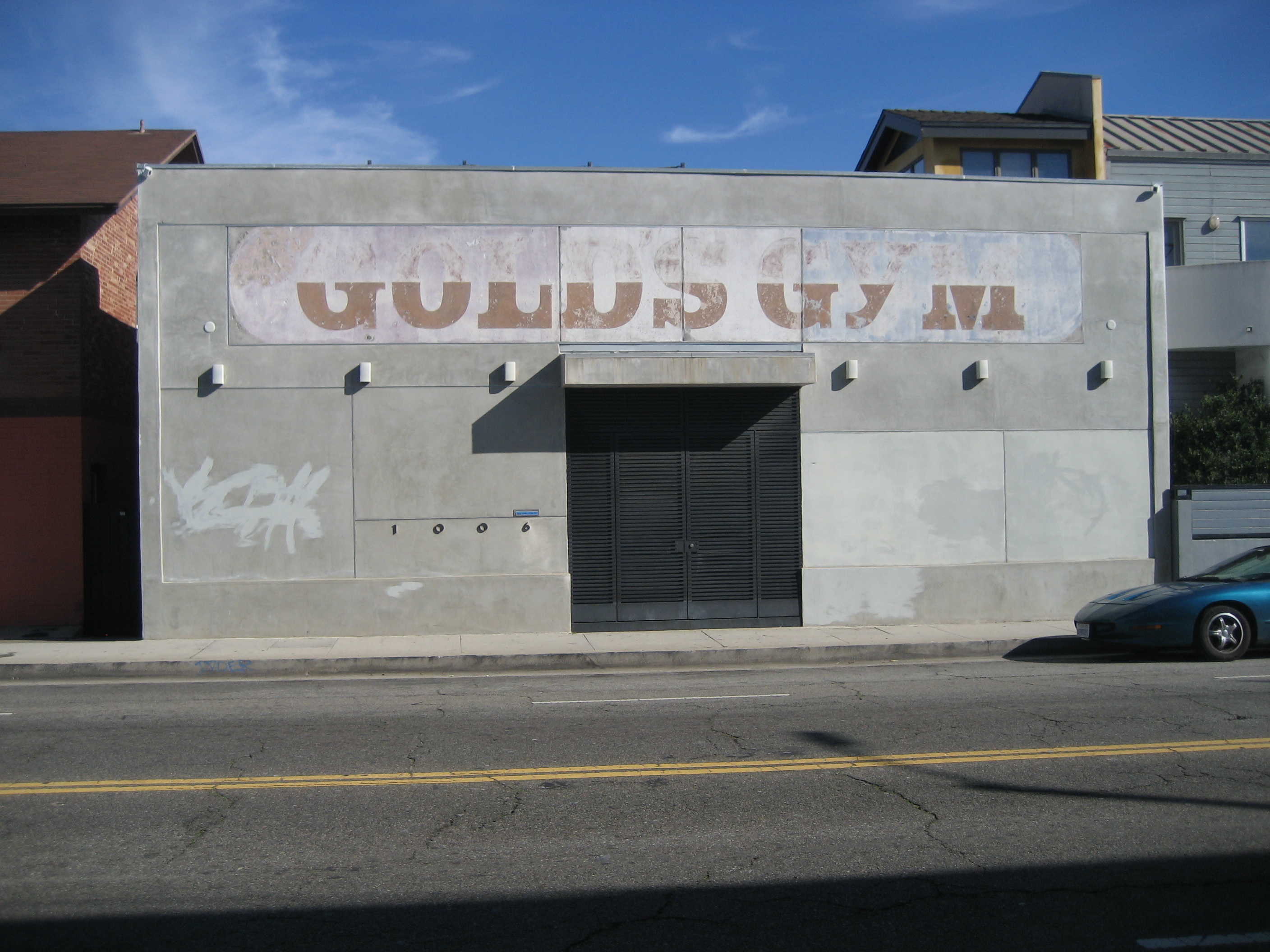
The original Gold's Gym located at 1006 Pacific Ave in Venice, California

Joe Gold opened the first Gold's Gym in August 1965, in Venice Beach, California, long before the modern-day health club existed. Featuring homemade equipment and dubbed "the Mecca of bodybuilding", it was frequented by Arnold Schwarzenegger and Dave Draper.

=== Early developments ===
In the 1950s, bodybuilding was seen as an anti-social outsider sport dominated by outcasts. Gyms in California, the early home of bodybuilding, were usually set up outdoors. An indoor gym had operated in Santa Monica, but it was shut down by the city in 1959 amid allegations of sexual misconduct.

Bodybuilder Joe Gold was dissatisfied with ad hoc gyms, and in 1965, he converted a building he owned on Pacific Avenue in Venice Beach into the first Gold's Gym. Many bodybuilders soon became enthusiastic clients. Dick Tyler commented it as "big news for big men", a location that would become synonymous with the rise of legendary bodybuilders like Arnold Schwarzenegger, Dave Draper, Lou Ferrigno, or Franco Columbu. However, despite the spirited reception and Gold's money-saving measures, such as building his own exercise equipment, monthly membership fees proved insufficient to maintain the business.

A veteran of the merchant marine, Gold wanted to go back to sea, and in 1970, he sold the business to antique dealer Dave Saxe and jeweler Bud Danits for $50,000 (equivalent to $415,000 in 2025). Saxe and Danits were also unable to operate the gym profitably and considered converting it into an antique shop. Instead, gym member Ken Sprague seized the opportunity and purchased the gym in late 1971. Having a background in the film industry, he injected new energy into the business by organizing bodybuilding competitions and shows to exhibit Gold's Gym athletes. Finally, Gold's Gym became profitable.

=== Logo ===
The original Gold's Gym logo, a bald weightlifter holding a barbell, was designed in 1973 by professional wrestler Ric Drasin, who was Arnold Schwarzenegger's training partner for four years. During a training break, he sketched the weightlifter on a napkin. The logo became an iconic symbol within the bodybuilding scene.

=== Gold's Gym as film set for Pumping Iron ===
Filmmaker George Butler filmed his 1977 docudrama Pumping Iron primarily at Gold's Gym. Sprague offered Butler full and unrestricted access to the gym.

To prepare and improve the gym as a film set, he had certain windows painted over to control backlight and installed a lighting grid. When the filmmakers ran out of funds to finish the production, Arnold Schwarzenegger and other bodybuilders helped raise additional funds for its completion. The docudrama became a hit, bringing attention not only to the gym itself but also to bodybuilding and physique in general. Gold's Gym became the most famous gym worldwide and more than tripled its membership prices. Gold's Gym continued to be considered a landmark in bodybuilding culture and achieved cult status.

=== Transition to an international franchise ===
In 1979, Gold's Gym was sold by Sprague to the trio Ed Connors, Pete Grymkowski (former Mr. World), and Tim Kimber. After two years of ownership, they moved from the 5500-square-foot facility into a 60,000-square-foot building over a six-year period. The three owners extended Gold's Gym to the franchise system and made licensing out deals all over the USA. Gold's Gym was one of the first companies in the health and fitness industry to franchise, starting in 1980.

Using the momentum of its fame it sold licenses for products such as fitness equipment and clothing. Soon the brand expanded internationally, after the first outside USA opening in Canada 1985. In 1993 the limit of 1 million members was exceeded. During the nineties Gold's Gym expanded globally. Due to the international franchise, the original character changed subsequently to a modern commercial gym fulfilling the standards of the modern fitness industry. In 1999 the company was sold to the private firm Brockway Moran & Partners for an estimated $50 million.

The company was sold again in 2004, to TRT Holdings, for $150 million. The growth of Gold's Gym continued expanding the business with modern wellness programs that grew to more than 3000 company partners. The original Gold's Gym in Venice Beach is considered a national sports landmark by ESPN and is named on its list of the 100 most important sports venues. Notable users of Gold's Gym have included numerous celebrities. In 2016 Gold's Gym opened 58 new locations across the world and in 2017 its first locations in Amman in Jordan.

=== RSG Group ===
In April 2020, the gym permanently closed 30 company-owned gyms, citing the COVID-19 pandemic. It filed Chapter 11 bankruptcy in the United States in May 2020.

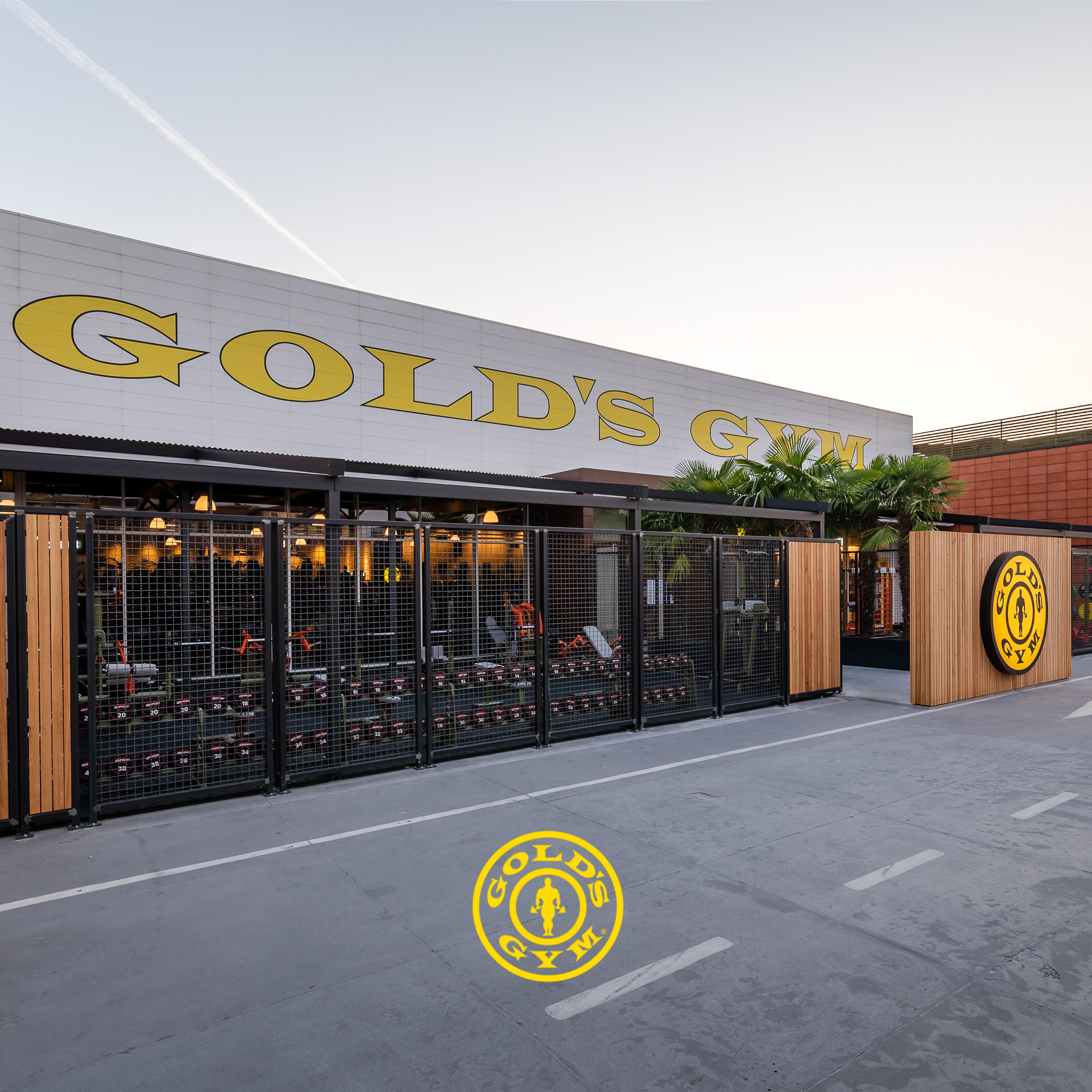
Gold's Gym Milano Monterosa in Italy

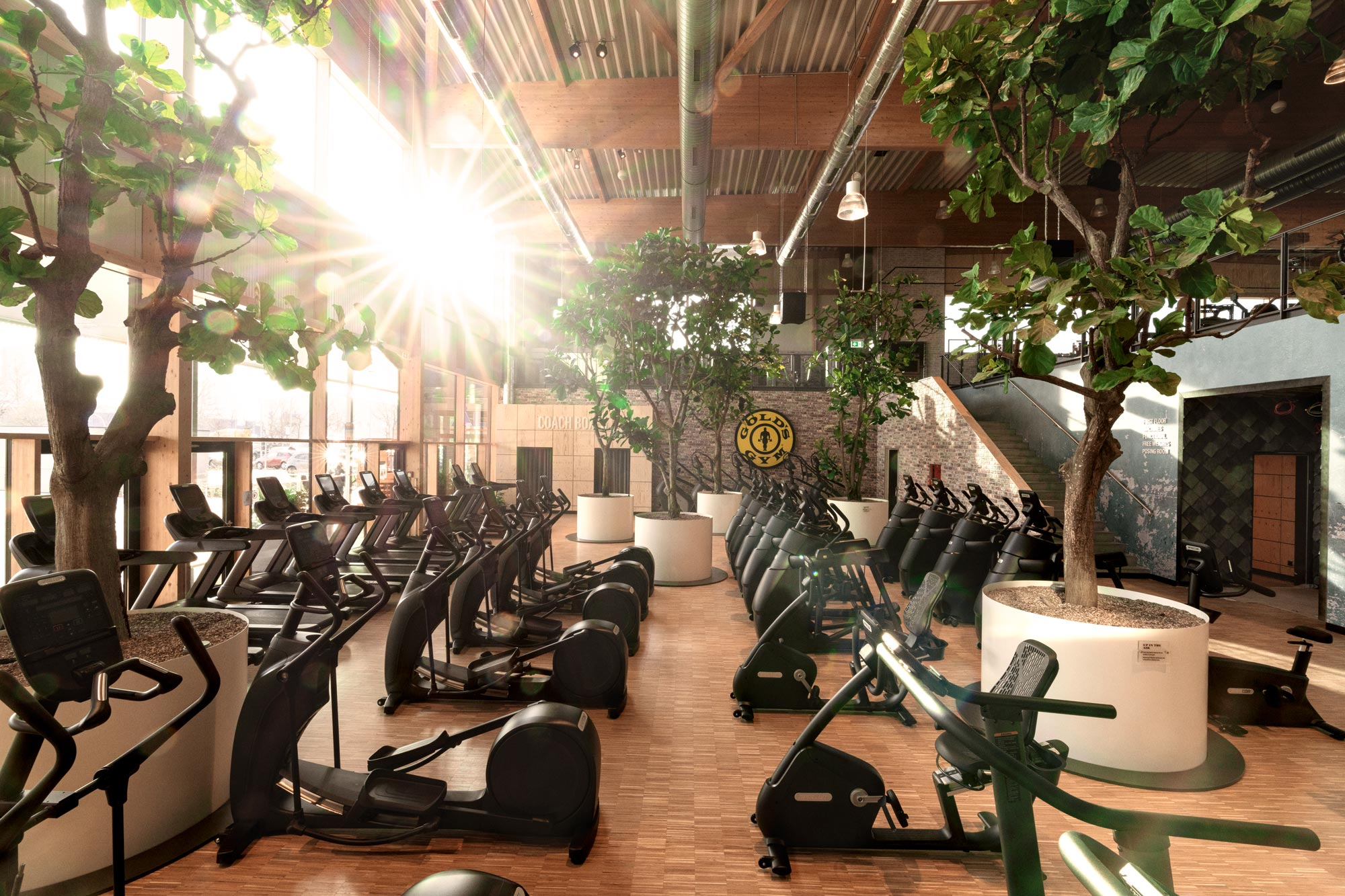
Gold's Gym in Berlin

In August 2020, German fitness company RSG Group won the auction of Gold's Gym for $100 million.

== Operations ==
Gold's Gym is privately owned by the German fitness company RSG Group. As of 2021, it has 660 locations worldwide. Corporate headquarters are in the Dallas metropolitan area.

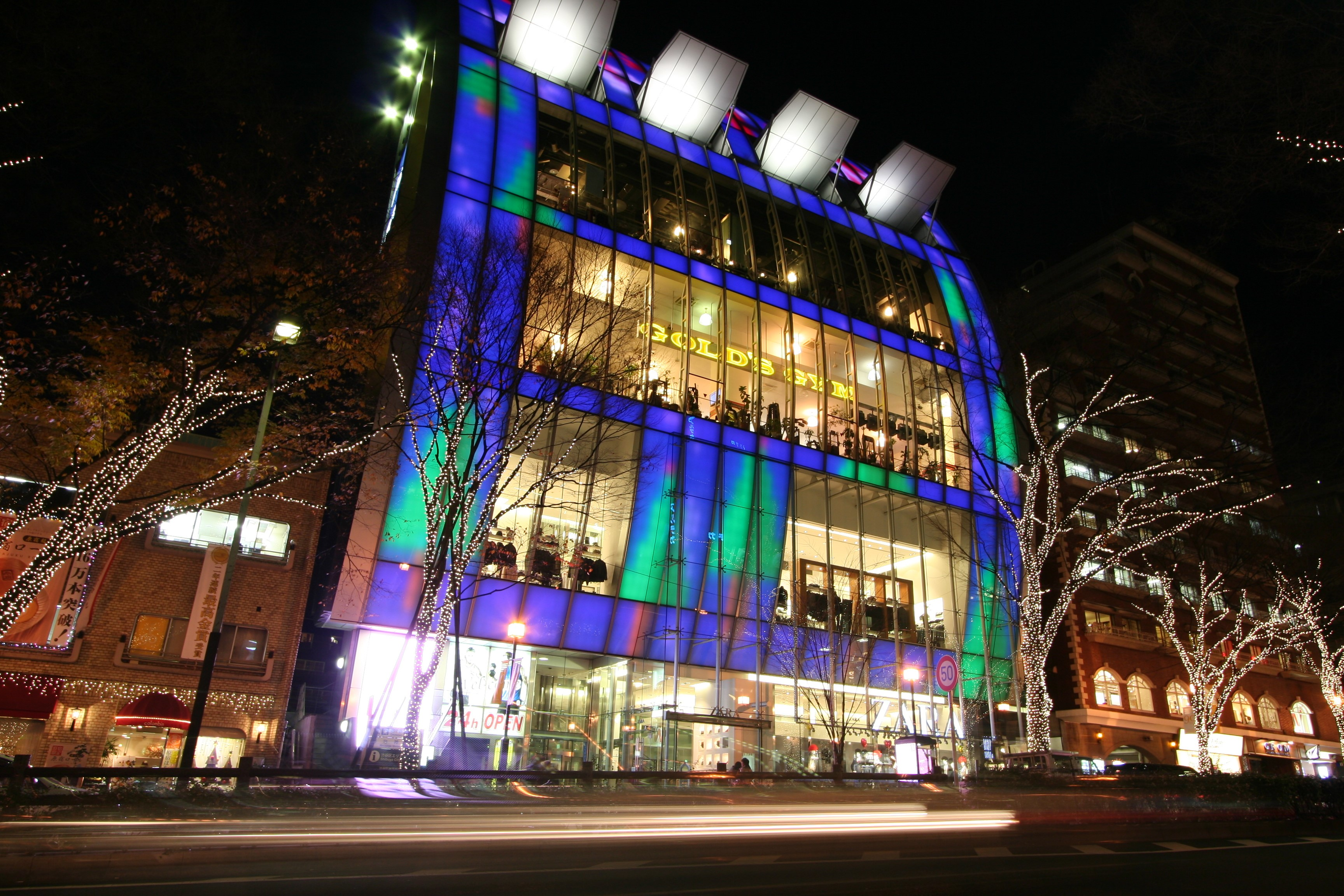
Gold's Gym Harajuku Tokyo

== Criticism ==
Numerous customers have reported that Gold's Gym franchises have acted in dishonest and unscrupulous ways. They cite advertised deals not being honored, billing irregularities, contract terms being fraudulently altered by sales staff after signing, and problems canceling accounts or relocating. A Gold's Gym in Provo, Utah, was successfully sued for fraud in 2006, for changing a contract after it was signed in 1999.

An accusation of the same conduct of fraud arose again in 2017: on February 10, 2017, the billing processor for the gyms, Paramount Acceptance, and 26 companies under the VASA Fitness name (including new gyms since 2014) were served with a consumer class action lawsuit with numerous causes of action including fraudulent misrepresentation, violations of the Telephone Consumer Protection Act, and violations of the Utah Consumer Sales Practices Act. The plaintiff published the entire complaint.

After ten years of litigation involving a licensing agreement for a fitness center in St. George, the Utah Supreme Court affirmed a decision to deny attorney fees to Gold's Gym even though Gold's Gym prevailed in the underlying litigation (Gold's Gym International, Inc. v. Chambers, 2020 UT 20).
