= Tammis Keefe =

American textile designer

- Born: Margaret Thomas Keefe; December 12, 1913; California, U.S.
- Died: June 5, 1960 (age 46); Ridgefield, Connecticut, U.S.
- Education: Chouinard School of Art
- Partner: Margaret Cousins

Tammis Keefe (December 12, 1913 – June 5, 1960), born Margaret Thomas Keefe, was an American textile designer, known for her colorful designs used on accessories such as handkerchiefs and scarves.

== Early life and education ==
Keefe was born in California, the daughter of Thomas F. Keefe and Emma Ellen Stone Keefe. Her father died a few days after she was born; her mother was a nurse. She was raised in Los Angeles, sharing a household with her maternal grandparents and aunts. She began her studies in mathematics at Los Angeles Community College. After a trip to Chicago to see the 1933 World's Fair, she enrolled as an art student at the Chouinard Art School in Los Angeles.

== Career ==
After she graduated from art school, Keefe worked at Disney Studios, and became the art director of Arts and Architecture magazine during World War II. By 1948, Keefe was working as a textile designer for Dorothy Liebes Studio in San Francisco, which provided textile designs to the furnishings firm, Goodall Industries. She also created freelance designs for other home decorative lines and wallpaper for various firms. She designed handkerchiefs commissioned by J. H. Kimball for Lord & Taylor in New York. Keefe was best known for her bright colors playful designs on handkerchiefs, kitchen towels and scarves. In 1960, her shirting fabrics were used for a line of blouses sold by G. Fox, where they were displayed with some of her original art. Some of her designs were signed "Peg Thomas". "Good modern design is simple and serene," she explained in 1949. "It doesn't break with the past—but it looks at the past with different eyes."

== Personal life and legacy ==
Keefe lived with writer and editor Margaret Cousins in New York City. She died from lung cancer in 1960, at the age of 46, at her summer home in Ridgefield, Connecticut. Fabric goods featuring her prints are considered collectible, and can be found at The Metropolitan Museum of Art, the Cooper Hewitt and the Museum at the Fashion Institute of Technology.

In 2000, Keefe's work was included in an exhibit titled "A Woman's Hand: Designing Textiles in America, 1945-1969", at the Fashion Institute of Technology. In 2013, some of her prints were reissued by Michael Miller Fabrics.
