= Louella Ballerino =

American fashion designer (1900–1978)

- Ballerino in an advertisement for Bates fabrics, 1946
- Born: Louella Smith; June 4, 1900; Brooklyn, Iowa
- Died: April 13, 1978 (aged 77)
- Education: University of Southern California
- Occupation: Fashion designer

Louella Ballerino (née Smith; June 4, 1900 – April 13, 1978) was an American fashion designer, best known for her work in sportswear.

== Biography ==
Louella Smith was born in Brooklyn, Iowa and her family later moved to Los Angeles. She attended the University of Southern California as an art history major, and worked with MGM costume designer André-ani. She supported her family by selling fashion sketches to wholesale manufacturers. She also studied pattern-making and tailoring at the Frank Wiggins Trade High School. While there she was made a tutor of fashion design, and began to create some of her own designs at a custom dress shop where she worked. In the late 1930s, she and a friend established their own business.

In the 1940s, Ballerino became well known as a member of the California Design sportswear movement. Following in the footsteps of Claire McCardell, Ballerino drew inspiration from African, Latin American, Pacific, and Caribbean native styles, and helped popularize ethnic garments such as the hopsack dress, midriff top, pollera, and dirndl in the United States.

She designed a popular line of swimwear for Portland manufacturer Jantzen and went on to become their chief designer in the 1950s.
