= Colt Studio Group =

American pornographic film studio

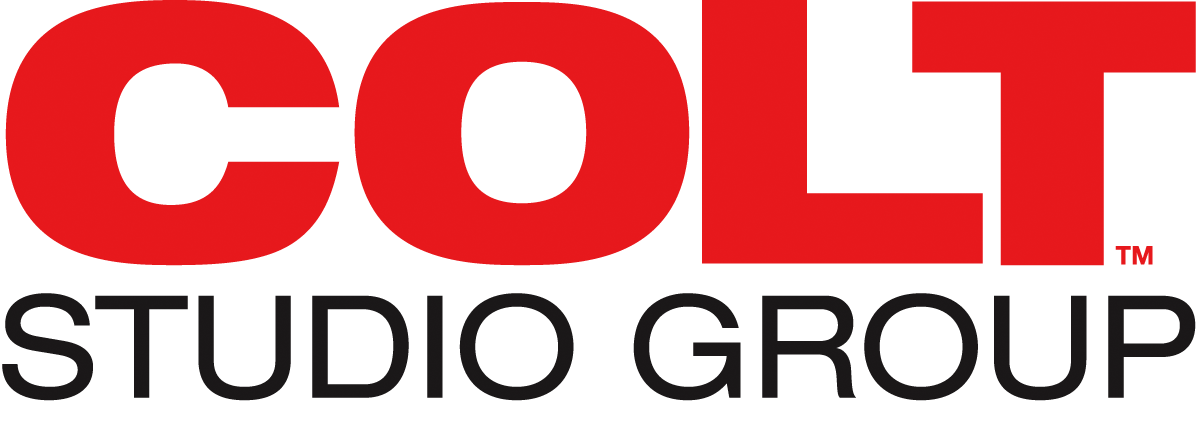
- Type: Private
- Industry: Gay pornography
- Founded: New York City, US (1967)
- Headquarters: San Francisco, California, US
- Website: Official website

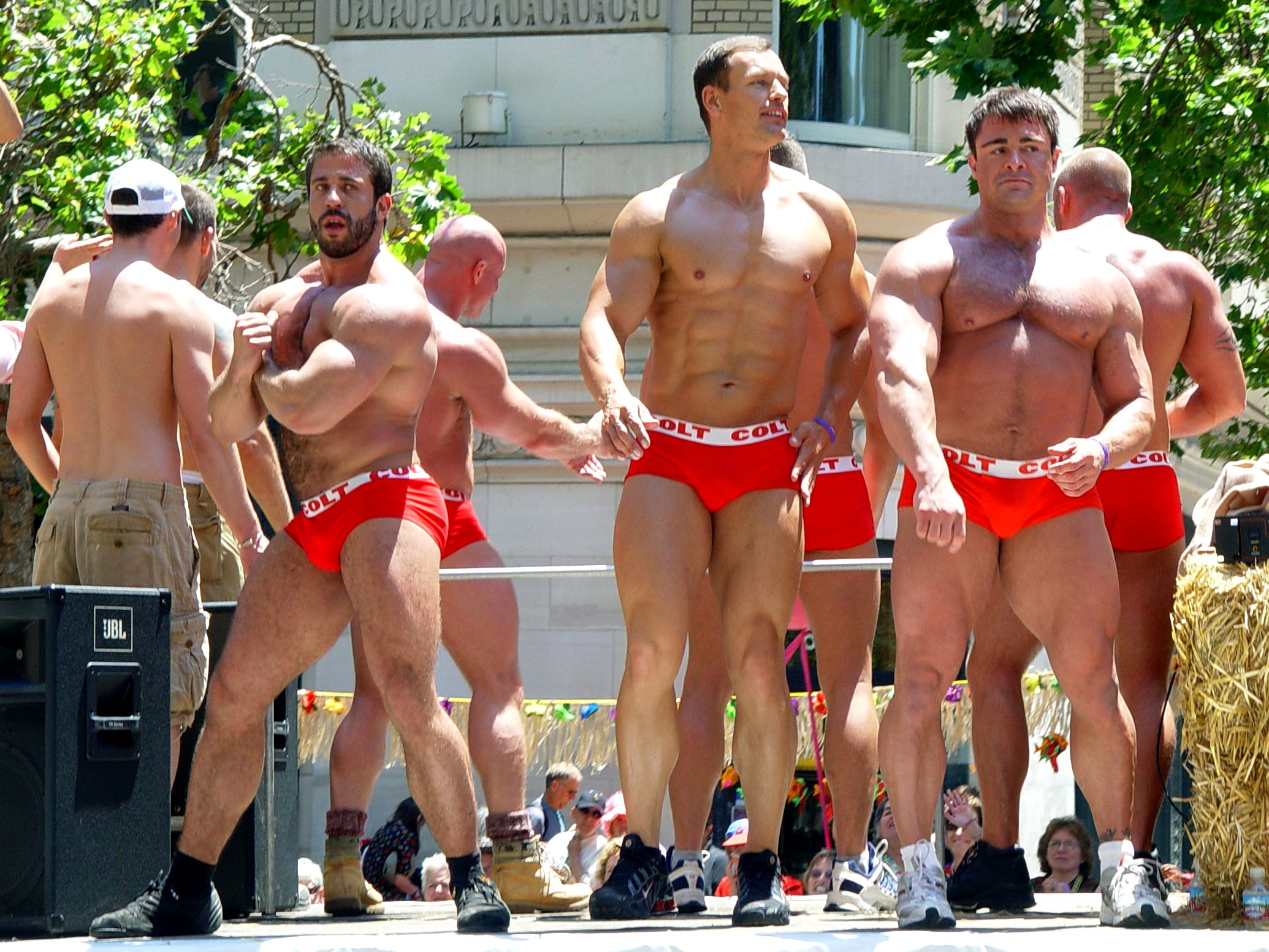
Colt men (among them Carlo Masi) at a 2006 San Francisco parade.

Colt Studio Group is an American independent pornography company. Colt has produced gay pornography since 1967. Colt started in New York City, moved to Los Angeles for 25 years, and is now based in San Francisco, California.

Colt photographed some of the most famous gay stars of the pre-AIDS era, including Bruno and Al Parker.

== History ==
In 2007, Colt Studio Group celebrated its fortieth anniversary. San Francisco mayor Gavin Newsom signed a proclamation declaring February 23, 2007 as "Colt Studio Day" in celebration of this anniversary. This proclamation attracted criticism from conservative commentators including then–Fox News commentator Bill O'Reilly.

== Popular models ==
1. Carlo Masi
2. Pat Sutton
3. Steve Kelso
4. Owen Moore
5. John Pruitt
6. Big Max

== Awards ==
GayVN Awards

- 2004 Best Renting Film: Reload, COLT Studio
- 2006 Best Solo Video: Minuteman 23, COLT Studio
- 2007 Best Solo Video: Minuteman 28, COLT Studio
- 2008 Best Solo Video: Minuteman 29, COLT Studio
- 2009 Best Solo Film: Minute Man Solo 31: Hangin' OUT, COLT Studio
