= Leanne Ratcliffe =

Australian vegan celebrity (born 1980)

- Born: 17 September 1980 (age 46); Queensland, Australia
- Other name: Freelee the Bananagirl
- Education: Australian Institute of Fitness
- Occupations: Author; speaker; YouTuber Raw vegan activist
- Years active: 2007–present
- Notable work: Raw till 4 Diet
- Movement: Raw veganism
- Children: 0
- Website: thebananagirl.com

Leanne Ratcliffe (known online as Freelee the Bananagirl) is an Australian YouTube personality, vegan activist, speaker, and author. She is the creator of the YouTube channel Freelee The BananaGirl, where she talks about her diet, exercise and lifestyle. Her channel, which was started in 2007, has accumulated over 790 thousand subscribers and 113 million views.

== YouTube channel ==
Ratcliffe began posting videos about her raw vegan diet in 2009. Her YouTube channel is popular, with more than 790k subscribers and over 330 million views. She is also active on other social media platforms like Facebook, Instagram and Twitter, where she has amassed a significant following.

Her username, Freelee the Banana Girl, is drawn from a combination of the word "Freedom," her first name, "Leanne," and her fruit of choice, bananas.

== Diet ==
Ratcliffe describes her diet as "frugivorous", a zoological term for species which thrive on a diet consisting mostly of fruit. Ratcliffe counters arguments against a high carbohydrate diet with examples of and references to the eating habits of the longest surviving Asian cultures. She maintains that a low fat and low salt diet is the key to effectively extracting nutrition from any kind of diet. She has been featured in publications such as Men's Fitness, Huffington Post, Daily Mail and News.com.au.

=== Controversy ===
The frugivore diet promoted by Ratcliffe is not considered advisable by many, if not all, mainstream nutritionists. Specifically, there are concerns that raw vegan diets which restrict nuts and seeds are too low in essential amino acids, fats, calcium, iodine, iron, and omega 3 fatty acids.

After the death of teenage makeup guru, Talia Castellano (known as Taliajoy18 on YouTube), Ratcliffe published a video claiming that Castellano's death could have been prevented had she forgone chemotherapy in favor of a raw food vegan diet. Ratcliffe also claimed that chemotherapy was a dangerous, poisonous, and ineffective treatment for cancer.

Ratcliffe has claimed that amenorrhea (the absence of her period) for nine months was a sign that her body was healthy and had fewer "toxins" to flush out via menstruation. In a modern medical perspective, amenorrhea in women of child-bearing age is frequently a result of low body weight, poor nutrition, disordered eating, and other illnesses. Additionally, maintaining living conditions resulting in secondary amenorrhea may result in infertility and osteoporosis, which is not always reversible. There is no scientific evidence that menstruation is a way for the body to "flush out toxins."

Ratcliffe has made many controversial statements criticizing the appearances of critics, other YouTube personalities, and overweight people in general. Ratcliffe posted a video in which she stated that more deaths were caused in the 9/11 terrorist attacks because of "obese people" blocking the doors, not allowing "fit people" to pass through. In late 2019, Ratcliffe was criticized for a response video she made to Emma Chamberlain's "what I eat in a day" video. She criticized Chamberlain's coffee consumption and appearance.

== Personal life ==
Before joining YouTube, Ratcliffe was at various times a bartender, a promoter for an alcohol brand, a snack vendor at a movie theater, a receptionist and an employee at McDonald's.

Ratcliffe was in a relationship with fellow YouTube personality Harley 'Durianrider' Johnstone for seven years before the couple split in 2016. While the two initially claimed the split was mutual, allegations later emerged of physical abuse from both parties and emotional abuse by Ratcliffe.

In 2018, Ratcliffe and her partner moved to a cabin in South America. The pair have since moved to Queensland, Australia, where she and her partner own 12 acres of rainforest.

== Books ==
Ratcliffe has advertised her own self-published e-books outlining her diet principles under the titles, ‘Raw Till 4 Diet’, ‘Go Fruit Yourself’ and ‘My Naked Lunchbox’. These books were met with the criticism that following her plans could lead to disordered eating, and nutritional deficiency, and that the diets are unbalanced and incredibly restrictive.
