= Jetts Fitness =

- Industry: Health club
- Founded: 2007
- Headquarters: Sunshine Coast, Queensland, Australia
- Number of locations: 129 gyms (Australia)
- Areas served: Australia; New Zealand; Thailand; United Kingdom; Netherlands
- Website: jetts.com.au

Jetts Fitness is an Australian-based chain of fitness centers. It is owned by private investors.

== History ==
Jetts Fitness was founded in Australia in 2007 by husband and wife Brendon and Cristy Levenson, with the first club opening in Gold Coast, Queensland.

In 2012, the company was selected by BRW as Australia's #1 Fastest Growing Franchise, with revenue growth of 403% and turnover of roughly $43 million, and in 2012 was the 2nd fastest growing company in Australia.

In 2016, the company was sold to Quadrant Private Equity, which owned the company through its Fitness and Lifestyle Group along with other Australian-based gym brands including Fitness First, Goodlife Health Clubs and Hypoxi.

In 2022, following a strategic review of its operations, Fitness & Lifestyle Group (FLG) sold via management buyout led by Jetts Fitness Australia CEO Elaine Jobson that encompasses 129 franchised clubs in Australia as well as international franchise businesses in the UK and the Netherlands.

Fitness and Lifestyle Group retains full ownership of its Jetts Fitness brand and operations in New Zealand, Vietnam and Thailand.

== International expansion ==
In June 2010, the franchise launched its first international club in Royal Oak, New Zealand. In late 2013, the first European club opened in the Netherlands, and the company announced further expansion plans into the UK in October 2014.

In January 2016, the company opened its first Asian club in Bangkok, Thailand. In 2021, there are roughly 33 clubs in Thailand.

In 2015, Jetts Fitness was named the best medium-sized fitness company at the New Zealand Exercise Industry Awards. That year the group operated about 250 clubs, comprising more than 300,000 members.

The head office is located in Sunshine Coast, Queensland.

== See also ==
- Australian Institute of Personal Trainers
