= Quadrant Private Equity =

Australian private equity investment firm

- Formerly: Quadrant Capital
- Type: Proprietary limited company
- Industry: Private Equity
- Founded: 1996; 30 years ago
- Founder: Chris Hadley
- Headquarters: Sydney, Australia
- Products: Private equity funds
- Website: quadrantpe.com.au

Quadrant Private Equity (also simply known as Quadrant) is an Australian private equity investment firm based in Sydney, Australia. The company was founded as Quadrant Capital in 1996 by Chris Hadley. Hadley now serves as the firm's Executive Chairman.

Quadrant hosts multiple investment funds which invest in businesses across a wide array of industries and sectors, specifically targeting management buyouts, growth capital and strategic equity transactions. The first three Quadrant funds delivered a collective 37% return between 1996 and 2006. Since its inception, Quadrant has raised $10 billion throughout 15 funds and has made over 100 investments.

The firm has owned or co-owned a number of well-known Australian companies including: Canva, Adore Beauty, Amart Furniture, Pumpkin Patch, One Rail Australia, Fletcher Building, TOWER Software, Virtus Health, Craveable Brands, Affinity Education, Barbeques Galore, Darrell Lea, Journey Beyond, Fitness First, and Timezone.

Quadrant is Australia's largest fitness centre operator through acquisitions of brands including Fitness First, Jetts Fitness and Goodlife Health Clubs. Quadrant has floated a number of its interests on the Australian Securities Exchange (ASX) including Kathmandu, Virtus Health, Isentia, APN Outdoor, Bapcor (previously Burson Auto Parts) and Estia Health.

== Notable investments ==
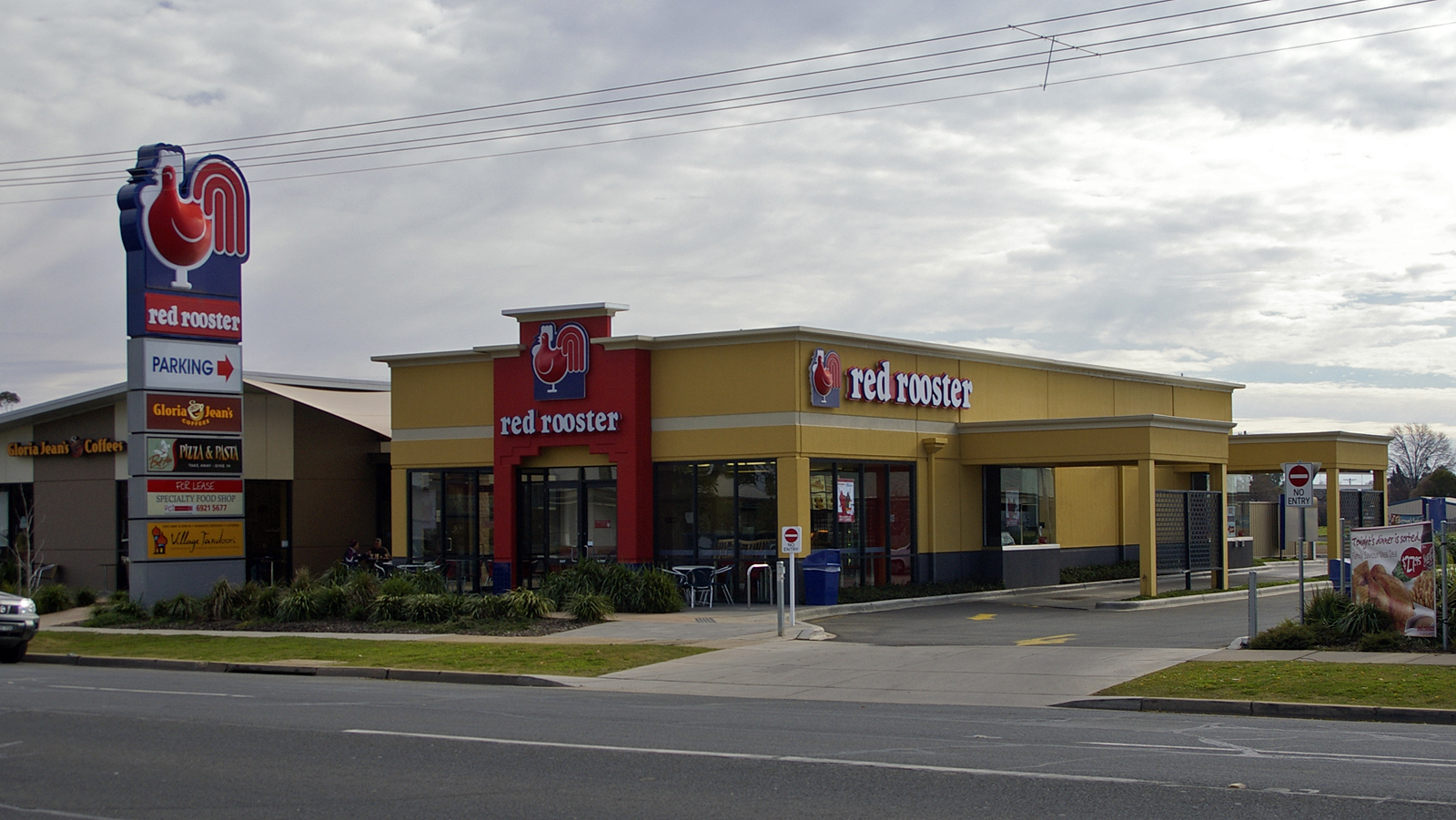
A Red Rooster outlet

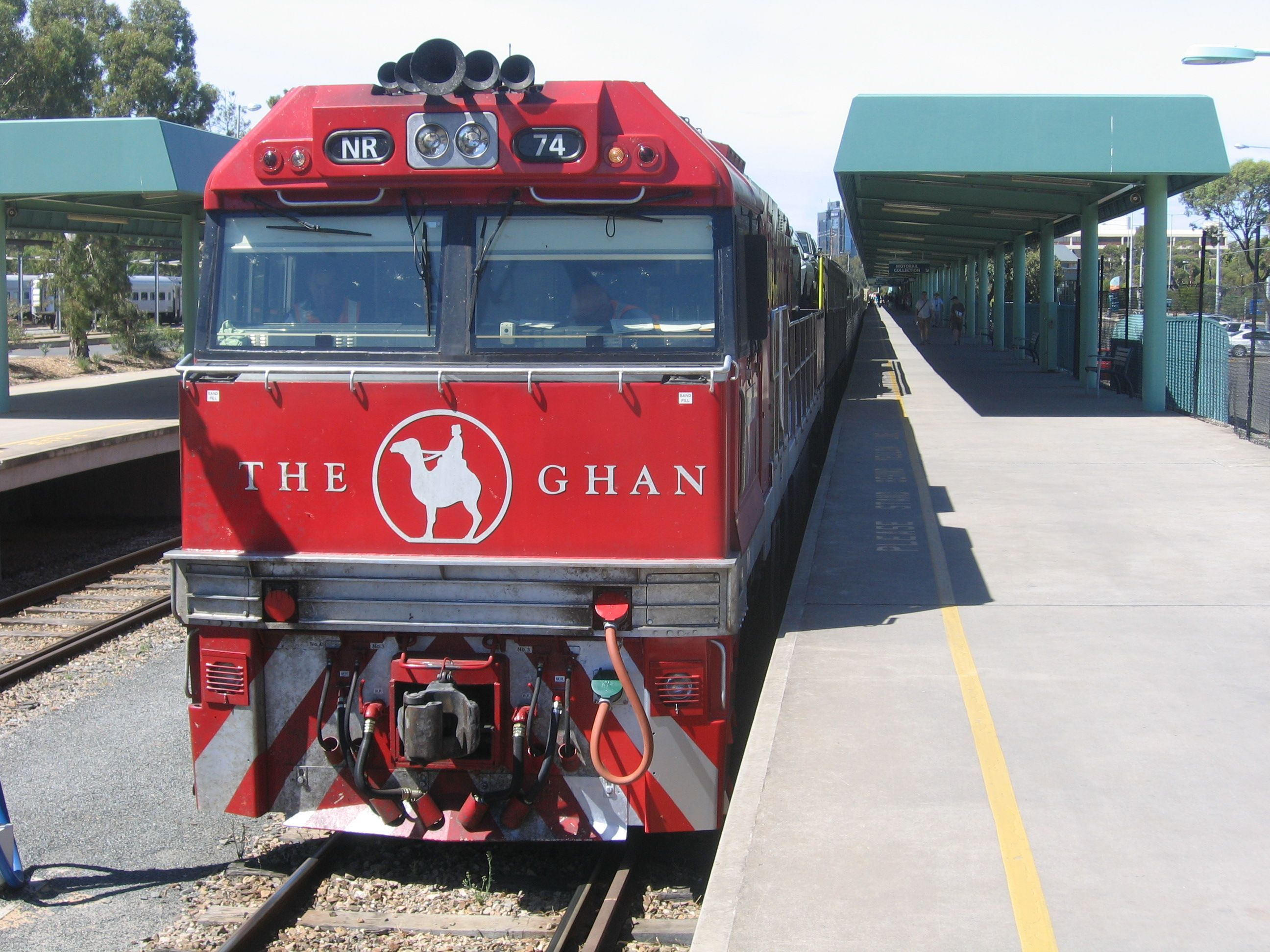
The Ghan, a rail service operated by Journey Beyond

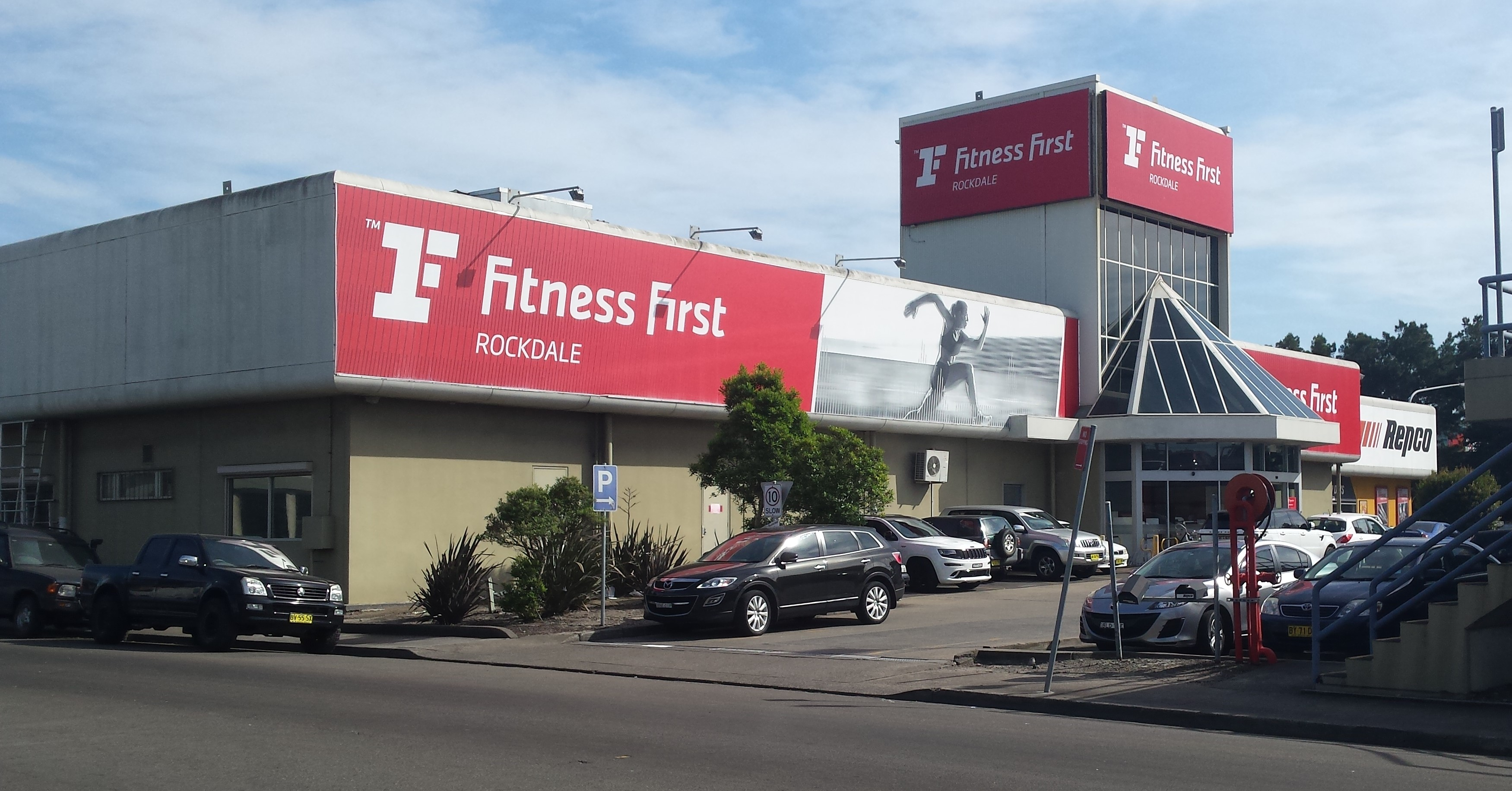
A Fitness First gym in suburban Sydney, Australia in 2016.

Quadrant bought Kathmandu Holdings in 2006 for NZ$275 million, floating the company on the ASX three years later for around AU$350 million.

In 2007, Quadrant acquired Australian-owned fast food restaurants Red Rooster, Chicken Treat and Oporto in deals collectively worth A$240 million, forming Quick Service Restaurant Holdings (renamed in 2017 as Craveable Brands). The group of 620 stores was sold in 2011 to Archer Capital for A$450 million.

Quadrant purchased a half-stake in advertising company APN Outdoor in 2011, before acquiring the remaining stake from APN News & Media in 2013 for around A$70 million. It was listed on the ASX in 2014.

In 2012, Quadrant and Ironbridge Capital formed BBQSAM Holdings after acquiring retailers Barbeques Galore and Amart Furniture.

Quadrant purchased Zip Industries in 2013 from its founder, and after abandoning an IPO offloaded the company to Culligan in 2017 for around US$550 million.

In 2014, Quadrant purchased a 45% stake in Canberra Data Centres for A$140 million, selling the businesses two years later. The deal was recognised with an award from The Australian Private Equity and Venture Capital Association Limited (AVCAL).

In 2015, Quadrant purchased Queensland-based pet food company VIP Pet Foods for A$410 million. After renaming the company The Real Pet Food Company, Quadrant sold the business to a foreign consortium including Singapore's Temasek Holdings and Chinese firms Hosen Capital and New Hope Group for A$1 billion in 2017.

In 2016, Quadrant acquired restaurants owned by chef Neil Perry through its Urban Purveyor Group for a reported A$65 million, creating the Rockpool Dining Group. Quadrant acquired a majority stake in Great Southern Rail in 2016, operator of the Indian Pacific and The Ghan train journeys, folding the company into its investments in Cruise Whitsundays and Rottnest Express to form tourism company Experience Australia Group.

Also in 2016, Quadrant Private Equity formed Fitness and Lifestyle Group, after purchasing Jetts Fitness, Goodlife Health Clubs, Hypoxi and the Australian arm of Fitness First, becoming the largest operator of fitness centres in Australia. The holding company is partially owned by Oaktree Capital Management. Queensland-based Go Health Clubs were added in 2017. The Australian arm of Jetts Fitness was divested in 2022, retaining the international Jetts brand including New Zealand and Thailand.

In 2017, Quadrant acquired a partial stake in gaming arcade company Timezone.

In 2017, Quadrant sold their majority share of Icon Group, Australia's largest oncology provider, in a reported $1.1 billion deal.

Quadrant purchased an 80-90% stake in confectionary company Darrell Lea in 2018 in a deal worth around A$200 million.

In 2019, Quadrant bought auction business Grays Online for A$60 million from Eclipx Group.

In 2020, Quadrant bought the Enterprise business from Arq Group as part of a consortium for A$35 million.

Quadrant acquired Jaybro, a supplier to the construction and infrastructure sector operating in Australia and New Zealand, in March 2022.

Quadrant's second Growth Fund invested in three New Zealand cybersecurity businesses in March 2023; the trio offers GRC, penetration testing, and cloud security services.

Quadrant's Strategic Equity Fund closed its biggest investment in May 2024; $500 million was invested into Canva’s secondary sale at a $25 billion valuation. Also in May 2024, Quadrant invested growth equity into Birch & Waite, valuing the company at $300 million.

It was announced in August 2024 that Quadrant partner Johnny Zhang accepted terms to invest in Evolution Surgical, a manufacturer of spinal implants. In November 2024, the firm offloaded its majority stake in Quad Lock to Thule in a deal that valued Quad Lock at $500 million.

In 2025, workers at Affinity Education – which owns Australian childcare brands such as Papilio, Milestones and Kids Academy – told of a toxic workplace culture where cost cutting, low wages, staff shortages and overreliance on trainees led to children being abused and harmed. Parents said conditions had dropped at childcare centres after Affinity bought them. Affinity expanded from 150 to 250 childcare centres since Quadrant took over, and in New South Wales its rate of compliance actions from the government regulator had increased to more than triple that of other providers. In December 2025, the company bought a 21% stake of New Zealand apparel company AS Colour.

== Funds ==
Quadrant Private Equity has operated a total of 15 individual funds.

Fund	Years active	Capital ($m)	No. of investments
Quadrant Capital Fund No. 1	1996-2007	$50	16
Quadrant Capital Fund No. 2	1998-2008	$75	13
Quadrant Capital Fund No. 3	2001-2009	$125	7
Quadrant Private Equity No. 1	2005-2015	$265	7
Quadrant Private Equity No. 2	2007-2017	$500	5
Quadrant Private Equity No. 3	2010-2020	$750	7
Quadrant Private Equity No. 4	2014-2024	$850	7
Quadrant Private Equity No. 5	2016-2026	$980	5
Quadrant Private Equity No. 6	2017-2027	$1,150	1
Quadrant Growth Fund	2019-2029	$400	8
Quadrant Private Equity No. 7	2020-2030	$1,240	6
Quadrant Growth Fund 2	2021-2032	$520	7
QPE MotorOne Fund	2022-2027	$255	1
Quadrant Strategic Equity Fund	2023-2033	$600	3
Quadrant Growth Fund 3	2024-2034	$660	0
