= Adore Beauty =

Australian beauty retailer

- Type: Public
- Traded as: ASX: ABY
- Industry: Retail
- Founded: 1999
- Founder: Kate Morris; James Height
- Headquarters: Southbank, Australia
- Number of locations: 9 stores (2025)
- Area served: Australia; New Zealand
- Key people: Sacha Laing (CEO)
- Website: adorebeauty.com.au

Adore Beauty is an Australian beauty retailer. The company was founded in 1999 by Kate Morris and James Height and is based in the suburb of Northcote in Melbourne, Victoria. It was listed on the Australian Securities Exchange in 2020. For most of its history, Adore Beauty operated as an online-only e-commerce business. It opened its first physical stores in 2025. The company also owns the Ikou wellness and skincare brand.

== History ==
The company was founded in 1999 by Kate Morris, a 21-year-old business student, and her boyfriend James Height. Morris used savings and an A$12,000 loan from Height's parents to start the business, which she ran out of her garage. She found a company in the newspaper to build the first website, which cost A$8,000 and took six months.

At first, the company only stocked two small Australian brands: Baiame and Santalia. The first mainstream brand, Bloom, signed on in 2002. Clarins signed on in 2006.

The company had a $2 million turnover by the end of 2010. In 2014, the company secured a deal with Estee Lauder Companies to become an authorized agent for Clinique, Bobbi Brown and Estee Lauder brands. That same year, the company earned over $7 million in revenue and ranked 29th in the Smart Company ‘Smart50’ Awards. Morris won the Innovation Award for Victoria in the 2014 Telstra Women's Business Awards.

In 2015, the Australian conglomerate Woolworths bought a 25% stake in the company for an undisclosed sum. The investment grew the company 70% over one year. The company reported an annual turnover of $16 million in 2016, carrying 150 brands and 10,000 products. The company is an official online stockist of Dermalogica, ghd, Clarisonic, Lancôme, Benefit Cosmetics, Aesop and Kérastase. The company's Findation service, which compares 22,000 foundations to find the best match, had 1.5 million users, as of 2015.

In 2016, the company began expanding into China by launching a digital shop front on Tmall. In 2017, Morris bought back Woolworths' 25% stake in the business, restoring full ownership to her. Morris and Height were co-CEOs until 2018 when Height became the sole CEO.

In 2019, Morris sold 60% of Adore Beauty to Quadrant Private Equity. In August 2020, Tennealle O'Shannessy took over as CEO from Height. In October 2020, the company listed on the Australian Stock Exchange. In March 2021, the company launched its Adore Society loyalty program. The company launched Viviology, its first private label skincare brand, in June 2022. The range was developed in collaboration with dermal therapist James Vivian and the brand is run separately from Adore Beauty. In October 2022, the company launched its second private label brand, AB Lab.

Tamalin Morton became CEO in January 2023 after O'Shannessy left the company the previous month. In May 2023, Morris and Height announced they would step down from their executive roles (chief innovation officer and chief data officer, respectively) at the end of June but retain their boards seats.

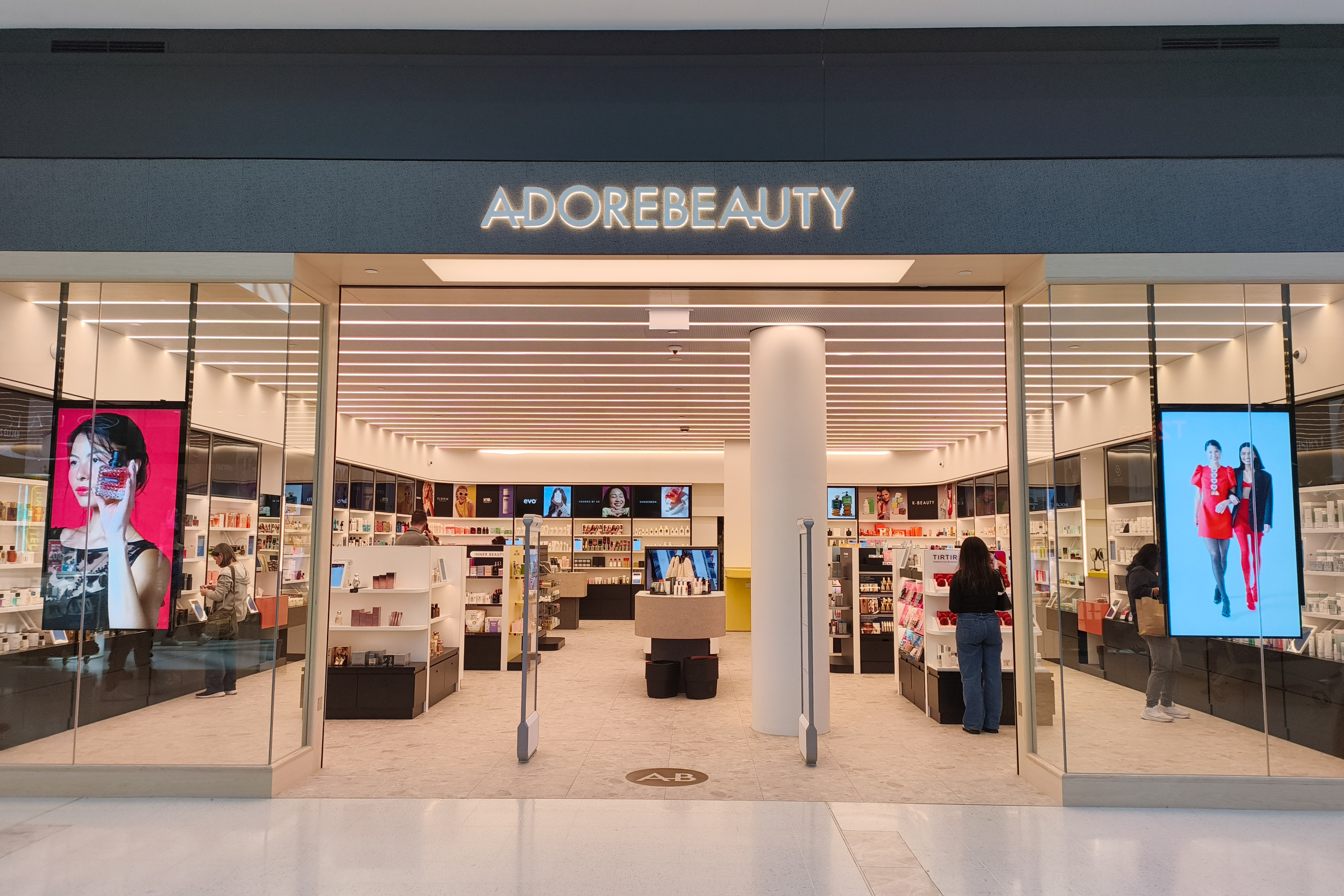
Adore Beauty store in Westfield Carousel

Adore Beauty purchased Ikou, a wellness and skincare brand with three stores in New South Wales, in June 2024 for $25 million. The purchase gave Adore Beauty its first physical retail footprint and helped the company improve its private label revenue. In July 2024, Sacha Laing took over as CEO. In November 2024, the company announced its plan to open at least 20 Adore Beauty stores and expand Ikou to 8–10 stores within three years. The first Adore Beauty store opened on 1 February 2025. As of November 2025, there are nine Adore Beauty stores across Australia.

In June 2025, the company rebranded its loyalty program to Adore Rewards and moved it to a cashback model. In November 2025, Adore Beauty was ranked number one on Power Retail's Most Loved Retailer Report.

== See also ==
- Mecca (company)
