= Barbeques Galore =

Australian barbecue and outdoor furniture retail company

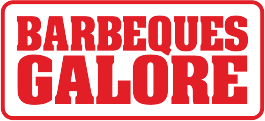
- Industry: Retail
- Founded: 1976
- Founder: Max Mason
- Fate: Receivership, liquidation and acquistion by ACOM International
- Key people: Mike Ainsworth (Chief Executive Officer)
- Products: Barbeques and accessories, outdoor furniture, and heating products
- Parent: ACOM International
- Website: www.barbequesgalore.com.au

Barbeques Galore is an Australian specialist barbeque and outdoor furniture retailer. It specialises in barbeque grills, accessories and consumables. As at February 2026, there were 68 company owned stores and 27 franchises.

With brands including Ziegler and Brown, Kamado Joe, Prosmoke, Traeger, Beefeater and Saxon, Barbeques Galore offers a wide range of gas and solid fuel barbeques, fuels and consumables, accessories, heating, and outdoor furniture.

In 2026, the company fell into receivership, only weeks after being turned to Gordon Brothers by Quadrant Private Equity in 2025. In June 2026, the company fell into liquidation after a recapitalisation deal fell through, with the remaining company-owned stores to close.

With the company-owned stores closed, on 3 August, the company's operations were acquired by ACOM International.

== History ==
Barbeques Galore was founded by Max Mason in Sydney, Australia in 1976. The company expanded to the United States in 1980, opening a store in Santa Fe Springs, a suburb of Los Angeles.

After ten years as a listed company on the Australian Securities Exchange, Barbeques Galore delisted in 1996, and listed on the US Nasdaq soon after. In late 2005, the firm was delisted from the Nasdaq after a leveraged buy-out by Australian venture capital firm, Ironbridge Capital. Ironbridge Capital split the Australian and US arms of the business into two separate entities, retaining ownership of both.

Following a severe downturn in business in the US, partly attributed to the fall in new housing on the back of the sub-prime mortgage crisis, Barbeques Galore USA filed for protection under Chapter 11 on 15 August 2008. Barbeques Galore US assets were purchased by Grand Home Holdings on 12 September 2008.

In 2016, the Australian company was acquired by Quadrant Private Equity. In 2019, Barbeques Galore's sales were close to the $200 million mark.

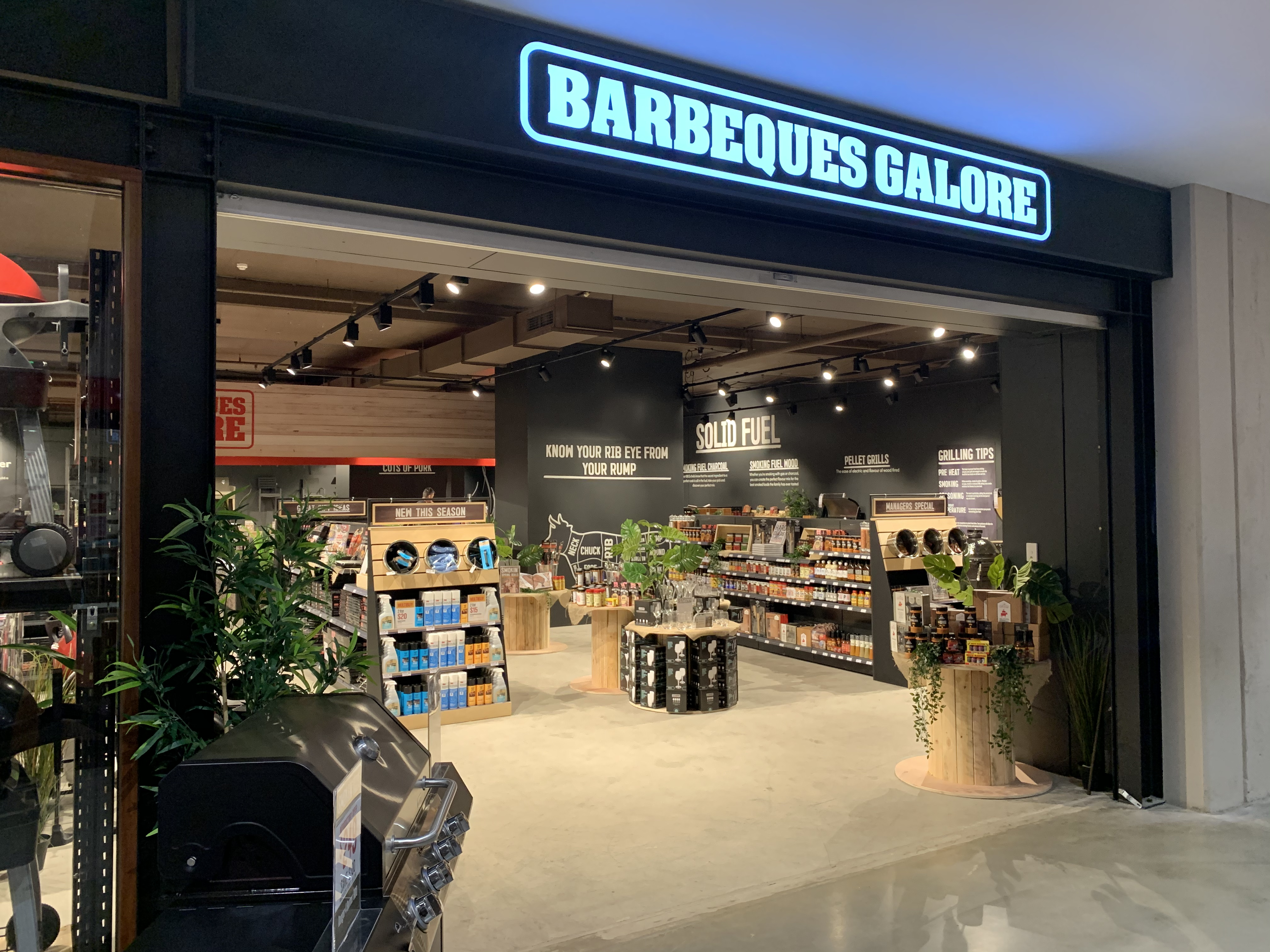
Barbeques Galore store at Artarmon

As part of a transformation of the brand, in 2020, Barbeques Galore launched a new TV campaign, ‘Now you’re cooking’, and also commenced the rollout of new store design, creating a more engaging in-store experience. The company also added a number of new product ranges in a number of stores, including the introduction of fresh BBQ cuts of meat.

Later that year, Inside Retail included Barbeques Galore on its list of the 20 coolest retailers for 2020. In 2021, Barbeques Galore won Gold at the Sydney Design Awards for its new concept store in Everton Park and, in 2022, was a winner at the Australian Retail Innovators Awards for the development and launch of the BBQ Legends loyalty program.

In 2022, the company outlined growth plans to open a number of new stores, expand ranges in store and online, and make further investment in its systems.

Barbeques Galore was named "Medium Retailer of the Year" at the Australian Retail Association’s annual awards for 2024, and was also presented with a Good Design Award for the Ziggy Elite portable grill in the same year.

In December 2025, the business was sold to the US investment firm Gordon Brothers. In February 2026, Barbeques Galore was placed in receivership with Ankura appointed receivers and managers and Grant Thornton appointed as administrator. At the time of entering administration, there were 68 company-owned stores and 27 franchises. "Liquidity issues" amidst a reportedly good turnaround have been blamed for the move, with receivers exploring options for the company.

On 31 March 2026, receivers announced they were closing five underperforming company-owned stores around the country identified by the directors, and that there is "significant interest" in the company with an outcome expected for mid-April.

On 9 June 2026, receivers announced that the remaining 62 stores will close, after receivers so far failed to find a buyer and suppliers could not approve a deed of company arrangement for Gordon Brothers to recapitalise the business themselves due to disagreements with their trading conditions. The franchisees are reported to not be affected by the receivership and continued to trade as beforehand during a "transitional" period. Grant Thornton was reportedly officially reappointed liquidator on 16 June.

On 3 August 2026, the company's intellectual property and wholesale network were acquired by Seaford, Victoria-based outdoor adventure wholesaler ACOM International. The franchisees will continue to operate as ongoing licensees under this new ownership, with the owners also considering leveraging online retail, wholesale and possible other retailers in order to reinvigerate the business.

== Products ==
Barbeques Galore was the exclusive Australian distributor of the Ziegler & Brown range of barbeques and accessories, including the award-winning Ziggy range of portable grills. Barbeques Galore also exclusively offers the Beefmaster range of barbeques, which carry a range of features including the SearPRO cooking system, Structural Heat Retention, and a 6-year warranty.

Barbeques Galore distributed Kamado Joe ceramic grills and accessories, and also carries a wide range of other leading brands, including Beefeater, Everdure by Heston Blumenthal, ProQ, Masterbuilt, and Traeger.

These brands were supported by a range of barbeque fuels, sauces, rubs, and other cooking accessories, and a range of outdoor furniture products. Heating products include the Saxon, Austwood and Norseman brand indoor wood heaters.
