= Australian Fitness & Health Expo =

The Fitness Show Australia
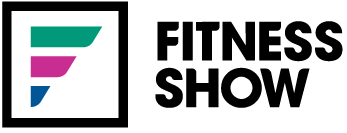
- Be inspired at Australia's leading fitness, health & wellness event.
- Status: Active
- Locations: Sydney Melbourne & Brisbane
- Country: Australia
- Inaugurated: 1995
- Attendance: 29,000+
- Organizer: Reed Exhibitions Australia
- Website: fitness-show.com.au

The Fitness Show Australia is Australia's largest fitness and health event and is owned and organised by Reed Exhibitions Australia.

Held annually at the Sydney Convention and Exhibition Centre in Darling Harbour, the three-day expo attracted 29,000 industry professionals in 2012.

In addition to exhibitors showcasing products, services, techniques and solutions, the Australian Fitness & Health Expo provides visitors with access to seminars, product launches, fashion parades and body building demonstrations.

== History ==
In 1995, the Australian Fitness Network launched the inaugural Fitness Industry Leisure Expo (FILEX) at the Sydney Convention & Exhibition Centre in Darling Harbour attracting 60 exhibitors and in excess of 3000 visitors.

Exhibitors at the inaugural event included: Lorna Jane, Gatorade, Reebok, Nike, IEP Body Mechanics, Avia, Clubnet, Ecomist, Repco Fitness, Kelmix, Cutting Edge, HF Industries, Aerobics Wear Australia, Mono, Music and Motion, LA Gear, Rhythm Express and Rock Wear.

In 1998, following Gatorade's appointment as naming rights sponsor, the convention and expo was renamed The Gatorade Fitness Expo. This reverted to the Australian Fitness Expo in 2001.

In 2004 the expo component was sold to Australian Exhibition Services, now Diversified Exhibitions Australia. The Australian Fitness Network continued to host the FILEX Convention, which is held alongside the expo.

In 2010, Diversified renamed the expo the Australian Fitness & Health Expo.

In 2012, the Australian Fitness & Health Expo was the largest in history with 287 exhibitors across 20,000 square meters. The Show incorporated a range of new additions including an 'Education' zone, a 'Wellness' zone and a 'Healthy Eating' zone. Celebrities Danny Green, Beto Perez, Ronnie Coleman, Michelle Bridges and Shannan Ponton were in attendance.

At the conclusion of the 2012 expo, Diversified Exhibitions Australia announced that it would triple its fitness portfolio in 2013-2014.

The Australian Fitness & Health Expo will be relocated to Melbourne in 2014 due to the redevelopment of the Sydney Convention & Exhibition Centre.

April 2013 will see the last expo held at the Sydney Convention & Exhibition Centre before moving to the Melbourne Convention & Exhibition Centre in 2014.

January 2017 saw another rebrand with the expo being renamed to "The Fitness Show".

May 2017 saw Reed Exhibitions Australia acquire a majority stake in Fitness Show Pty Ltd (Fitness Shows) from event operator T2M.

November 2017 saw a Fitness Australia led joint venture acquire FILEX from the Australian Fitness Network. The purchase was made by FILEX holdings, a joint venture made up of Fitness Australia and four other parties.

In July 2020, Director of The Australian Fitness Show, Shaun Krenz announced that he was stepping down from his role as Director. Later that month Reed also announced they would no longer be continuing the Fitness Show.

In 2021, a new tradeshow for the Australian Fitness Industry was announced "Fitness + Wellness Australia" (FWA). The inaugural event will be held in late November at the International Convention Centre Sydney, Darling Harbour. In April 2021 Fitness Australia announced they would partner with the event.

== Community ==
The event has been supported by non-profit organisations, such as the National Heart Foundation of Australia and Diabetes Australia-NSW, and also receives support from industry organisations including GymLink, FILEX, Fitness Australia, Fitness First and industry magazine Australasian Leisure Management.

== See also ==
- Australian Institute of Fitness
- Australian Institute of Personal Trainers
