= Luba Grigorovitch =

Australian politician

Luba Grigorovitch MP

Minister for Youth
- Incumbent
- Assumed office 15 April 2026
- Premier: Jacinta Allan
- Preceded by: Natalie Suleyman

Minister for Carers and Volunteers
- Incumbent
- Assumed office 15 April 2026
- Premier: Jacinta Allan
- Preceded by: Ros Spence

Member of the Victorian Legislative Assembly for Kororoit
- Incumbent
- Assumed office 26 November 2022
- Preceded by: Marlene Kairouz
- Parliamentary group: Labor Left (Industrial Left)

Personal details
- Born: Altona, Victoria
- Party: Labor
- Spouse: Ben Gray
- Website: Official website

Luba Norma Grigorovitch is an Australian politician. She represents the Labor Party and is a former trade union official.

Since the 2022 state election, she has been the representative of the District of Kororoit in the Victorian Legislative Assembly, sitting as a backbencher. Prior to the election, she was a state secretary of the Rail, Tram and Bus Union (RTBU). She is a member of the Industrial Left faction of the Victorian ALP.

She is married to Ben Gray, a founding partner of private equity firm BGH Capital, and the son of the former Liberal Premier of Tasmania, Robin Gray.

== Early life and education ==
Grigorovitch was born in Altona. She was raised mostly by her mother, who cared for her and her brother Robbie, as well as her uncle Ken, who had an intellectual disability.

She attended secondary school at Mount St. Joseph Girls' College in Altona. When she was twelve, she was present during a visit by Joan Kirner, the first female premier of Victoria. Her mother was an ALP member and noticed her daughter's enthusiasm about this encounter, encouraging her to attend a party branch meeting. After that, Grigorovitch became an active member of her local branch. (Note: Luba Grigorovitch, Member for Kororoit (8 February 2023). "Address to Parliament" (PDF). Parliamentary Debates (Hansard). Vol. 60th Parliament. Parliament of Victoria: Legislative Assembly.)

She attended Melbourne's Victoria University, completing a double bachelor's degree in Arts and Business.

== Career ==
In 2008, Grigorovitch was elected as a councillor for the City of Hobsons Bay. She was re-elected in 2012, and assumed the role of Deputy Mayor.

Her involvement with the RTBU began in 2010. Her initial role in the union was as an industrial officer and women's officer in its Victorian branch. In 2011, she became an elected organiser and women's officer for one of its divisions. (Note: The union's Administration, Salaried, Technical and Professional Division)

In 2014, she became the first female, and youngest, state secretary of the RTBU. (Note: In February of that year she was appointed to the position and, in November, was elected by the union's membership) During her tenure as the state secretary, the union undertook industrial action in pursuit of enterprise agreements with Metro Trains and Yarra Trams. There was also an unsuccessful campaign in 2017 to pressure the Andrews Labor Government to return Victoria's railways to public ownership.

In 2015, Grigorovitch was elected to the national body of the ACTU executive. In 2019, she was appointed national president of the RTBU, serving until 14 December 2022. She was the first female national president of the union.

In December 2021, she was preselected as Labor's candidate for the safe seat of Kororoit. The incumbent member, Marlene Kairouz, attempted to retain preselection but was defeated in internal party processes. Following that, in April 2022, Grigorovitch resigned as the state secretary of the RTBU and was succeeded by Vik Sharma. John Setka spoke at her farewell event in June of that year.

=== Parliamentary career ===
Grigorovitch was elected as the member for Kororoit at the 2022 Victorian state election. She sat on the board of the Victorian Responsible Gambling Foundation until, under the Victorian State Labor Government, the foundation "ceased operating from 1 July 2024". She also Chairs the Victorian Parliament's Electoral Matters Committee.

In December 2024, Grigorovitch was appointed Parliamentary Secretary for Outdoor Recreation in the Allan Labor Government.

In April 2026, Grigorovitch was appointed Minister for Youth in the Allan Labor Government.

== Personal life ==
In 2017, Grigorovitch attended the Australian American Leadership Dialogue where she met Ben Gray. He later founded the Australian private equity firm BGH Capital, with business partners Robin Bishop and Simon Harle. In December 2020, The Age reported that the two had been quietly dating.

In January 2023, Grigorovitch and Gray married at their Portsea home. Former Greens MLC, Colleen Hartland, officiated. The wedding was attended by many of Victoria's political, business, and union elite, including Premier Daniel Andrews, Public Transport Minister Ben Carroll, union leader John Setka, and Alan Tudge M.P., who was best man. Reportedly, the event was a popular topic of discussion among Victorian politicians even a week after the date.

The couple's ownership of a $30m mansion has also been a talking point in Victorian political circles, with the Herald Sun reporting speculation that it would be used by opponents to harm her political image. In response to a request for comment on the issue, Grigorovitch stated she was "proudly a woman from the west", and pointed to her having a mortgage being paid in her own name.

According to her parliamentary register of interests, Grigorovitch is a landlord, owning a rental property in Southbank, as well as industrial land in Altona. Her partner runs the Australian private equity firm BGH capital.
