= Kamado (disambiguation) =

A kamado is a traditional Japanese wood- or charcoal-fueled cook stove.

Kamado may also refer to:

- Kamado, alien race that appear in Marvel Comics.
- Kamado family, fictional family from the manga Demon Slayer: Kimetsu no Yaiba
  - Nezuko Kamado (竈門 禰豆子)
  - Tanjiro Kamado (竈門 炭治郎)
- Kamado Joe, brand of Barbeques Galore
- Kamado Shrine (竈門神社), Shinto shrine in Dazaifu, Fukuoka prefecture, Japan
- Kamado Station (釜戸駅), railway station in the city of Mizunami, Gifu Prefecture, Japan
- Kamado Ueshita (上下 かまど), fictional character from the manga Future Diary
