= The Biggest Loser Australia season 2 =

The Biggest Loser Australia
- Season 2
- Starring: Jillian Michaels; Bob Harper; Michelle Bridges; Shannan Ponton; Steve Willis
- Presented by: Ajay Rochester
- No. of episodes: 68

Release
- Original network: Network Ten
- Original release: 4 February – 26 April 2007

Season chronology
- ← Previous; Season 1 Next → Season 3

The second season of the Australian version of the original NBC American reality television series The Biggest Loser premiered on Sunday 4 February 2007 at 7pm on Network Ten, with the finale on 26 April 2007. The show features 14 overweight contestants competing for A$200,000 and the title Australia's Biggest Loser for 2007. The eventual winner was Chris Garling, one of "The Outsiders", who lost 70.1 kg (46.89% of his start weight). Eliminated contestants also had the chance to compete for a runners-up prize of $50,000, which was won by Michael losing 70.0 kg (42.37% of his start weight). Five episodes were screened each week night, with a sixth episode introduced on Sunday nights. Industry experts were skeptical of its success screening on this competitive night. The show averaged more than 1 million viewers each night, peaking at 1,995,000 viewers for the finale and 1,560,000 viewers for a weigh-in show. Over 10,000 Australians applied, 2,000 more than the 2006 season. The show is licensed and produced by FremantleMedia Australia in association with Reveille.

14 contestants (2 more than the previous season) competed in 2 teams, later becoming pairs and then playing individually. An additional four being introduced throughout the game as part of twists or as replacement contestants. In the first two weeks, one contestant voluntarily quit and one withdrew on medical advice.

Two new Australian trainers, Michelle Bridges and Shannan Ponton, were introduced to replace the previous American trainers Bob Harper and Jillian Michaels who reprised their role temporarily. Although Michelle states she doesn't like the format of the reality television show, she feels in the end it is helping change people's lives. Jillian was ridiculed for participating in the Australian version and not the American version, she stated that the Australian show represented her more accurately. Contestants were also introduced to former SAS soldier Steve Willis, dubbed "The Commando". Bob and Jillian left at the end of the second week, revisiting in the eighth week for a final time.

Two main new elements were introduced to the game including "The Walk" which gave contestants power to change the outcome of the game and a further two contestants were "secretly" trained outside the house and entered as "The Outsiders".

Before going to air, there were various allegations that Australian Idol winner Casey Donovan had applied to be a contestant and had been rejected. Network Ten argued that Donovan had simply not survived the application process. Further criticism was received by exercise experts, saying the show promoted risky weight loss techniques and may endanger the show's viewers. There was also much criticism of contestants leaving on medical advice after multiple health scares.

== Season Overview ==
=== Game variations ===
Immunity: A small change to immunity was that the contestant to win immunity retained it for the following week if no other contestant gained immunity.

"The Walk": A new element known as "The Walk" involved the winner of the immunity challenges having a random choice of four game-altering options. Some options included a 24-hour training prior to the first weigh-in, choosing replacement contestants, swapping team members, giving up immunity, and immediate mid-week elimination.

New Trainers: Two new primary Australian trainers were introduced, who appeared to replace the previous American trainers. A third element was former SAS soldier Steve Willis dubbed "The Commando" who was used for rewards or penalties in challenges. The Commando trained "The Outsiders" at a secondary training secret ranch before they entered the game.

"The Outsiders": Two contestants called "The Outsiders", Chris Garling and Kimberlie Stewart, entered the game in week 7, having been weighed in the white house at the beginning of the game without the knowledge of all other contestants. They were trained with the Commando during the 6 weeks before entering the house and formed a pair upon entering the game.

"Wild card" contestant: As with the previous season, all previously eliminated contestants were invited to return to the game for a second chance "wild card" entry back into the game. The difference with this game element was that only 5 out of the returning 10 contestants could enter the game by winning a qualification weigh-in. All eliminated contestants returned except for walk-out contestants Sarah, Jules and Sam. P'eta chose not to return, similar to Tracy from the first season.

Trainer's Choice Award: At the end of the series a Suzuki Grand Vitara was awarded to Jules by the trainers, recognizing her for "handling herself exquisitely throughout the whole show".

=== List of episodes ===
There were a total of 68 episodes that followed the general weekly format of Elimination, Minor Challenge, Temptation, "The Walk", Major Challenge, and The Weigh-in. In some instances, episodes were replaced with specials where major twists were introduced, or previous events were explained for viewers missing information. Some of these special episodes included:

- Two contestants leave: Due to unexpected withdrawal of contestants, episode 3 in week 1 focussed on this event.
- The game so far: In week 6 was a recap episode where all previous episodes were summarised.
- Duos Decided: In week 6 teams were separated into pairs. Damien won the minor challenge and power to choose pairs.
- The Biggest Twist Thus Far; The Outsiders: The secret contestants training on the outside for 6 weeks enter the house in week 7.
- Make Overs: Remaining contestants were given new clothes and hairstyles for a magazine photo-shoot in mid week 8.
- Fear Challenges: Replacing the regular spot for "The Walk", fear challenges were personal mental challenges that each remaining contestant participated in, for no tangible reward. The 6 remaining contestants were flown to Queenstown, New Zealand. Courtney went on a large cliff swing, Chris used a rocket swing, Damien and Kimberlie rock climbed a 30 m cliff face, Munnalita bungee jumped and Pati participated in white water sports
- Mountain hike: Contestants participated in a mountain hike, add weighted bags weighing the amount of weight they had lost each week. All contestants reaching the mountain peak carrying the weight they started the show with. The experience was to feel the relief when they removed their backpacks. Kimberlie added an extra 40 kg to match what she was at her heaviest weight.
- Return of the eliminated contestants: On being invited back for a chance to enter back into the game, contestants went through various challenges:
  - Second chance challenge: Contestants were required to hold two medicine balls whilst balancing on a series of three varied sized logs, each one smaller than the last, for half an hour each. Mel, who had an ankle problem stepped down and was immediately eliminated. Gerard won the challenge, Kelly coming a close second.
  - Second chance temptation: Contestants had a 1 in 6 chance to receive a wild card chance, elimination and other prizes. Laura won a guarantee qualification, Greg was immediately eliminated. Other prizes included a trip won by Kelly, a scooter won by Alex, a small hamburger and chips won by Damien, and a chocolate platter won by Courtney. Michael and Marty chose not to participate in the temptation challenge.
  - Super Challenge: Remaining contestants competed in a sand dune and mental challenge, with the three remaining places going to Michael, Marty and Damien. Courtney, Alex and Kelly were immediately eliminated.
- Train the trainers: Mid week 11 contestants were tested with their knowledge of training routines in preparation for moving outside of the game.
- Trainer's Choice Award: The episode before the finale was a consolation for Jules who withdrew from the show on medical advice. She was given a Suzuki Grand Vitara

=== The Weigh-Ins ===
At the end of each week, contestants must be weighed to determine how much weight they had lost since the previous week or weigh in. Generally the person with the highest weight loss receives immunity. With teams, the total percentage of weight loss for the team must be highest to avoid elimination. With pairs and individuals, players must come in "above the yellow line" which is usually the 2 lowest weight losers of the week. Weigh-in episodes were generally screened on Sunday nights, or left as a cliffhanger and combined with elimination episodes.

Contestant	Age	Height	Starting BMI	Ending BMI	Starting weight	Week													Kilos Lost	Percentage lost
Contestant	Age	Height	Starting BMI	Ending BMI	Starting weight	1	2	3	4	5	6	7	8	9	10		11	Finale	Kilos Lost	Percentage lost
Chris	23	198	38.1	20.3	149.5						118.2	111.8	104.8	101.0	X	93.1	89.9	79.4	70.1	46.89%
Marty	38	193	43.1	25.4	160.6	150.2	146.0	141.6	136.8	130.1	122.5	119.9	121.0		117.5	109.9	105.0	94.7	65.9	41.03%
Pati	26	172	40.6	24.4	120.2	114.9	111.5	108.9	105.1	101.4	96.3	94.1	92.6	90.0	X	85.4	84.8	72.2	48.0	39.93%
Munnalita	32	170	44.0	25.6	127.3	119.4	116.4	113.5	110.5	106.9	97.9	97.9	95.3	92.9	X	86.6	85.0	74.1	53.2	41.79%
Kimberlie	32	173	47.4	31.7	141.8						121.5	119.4	114.6	110.4	X	105.2		95.0	46.8	33.00%
Courtney	21	185	40.7	28.7	139.2	133.5	130.3	126.9	123.5	117.2	111.2	110.5	108.7	107.9	107.9			98.3	40.9	29.38%
Damien	34	188	70.6	40.1	216.3	203.2	201.0	193.8	187.1	179.7	174.5	170.6	173.0	X	167.0			141.7	74.6	34.49%
Laura	20	175	35.7	23.8	109.2		105.2	103.8	101.2	95.7	94.4	93.1			88.9			84.2	25.0	22.89%
Mel	24	183	32.4	23.3	108.4	100.7	98.7	96.4	94.7	90.2	88.0				85.0			78.0	30.4	28.04%
Greg	33	175	48.6	32.6	148.8	138.7	134.8	132.3	126.6	121.2	114.7				110.6			99.9	48.9	32.86%
Jules	34	170	43.8	31.7	126.5	120.2	118.2	115.1	111.4	106.9								91.6	34.9	27.59%
Gerard	43	175	43.6	29.5	133.5	126.1	122.1	120.6	116.4						104.0			90.2	43.3	32.43%
P'eta	27	179	41.1	33.3	131.6		127.7	126.3										106.7	24.9	18.92%
Michael	28	192	44.8	25.8	165.2	155.6	151.0	145.7							120.9			95.2	70.0	42.37%
Kelly	28	174	38.7	29.4	117.1	112.7	108.7								94.4			89.1	28.0	23.91%
Sam	37	171	43.8	29.9	128.0	121.0												87.4	40.6	31.72%
Alex	37	167	55.6	40.7	155.2	144.6									121.3			113.4	41.8	26.93%
Sarah	24	170	53.0	X	153.3													Did not attend		

Standing
Week's Biggest Loser
Immunity
The Biggest Loser
Winner of the At-Home prize

=== Eliminations ===
Each week, after a weigh in, contestants must cast a vote against another contestant and avoid elimination. The contestant that received the most votes left the game immediately. Contestants can avoid elimination by their team or themselves losing the most percentage of weight loss, winning immunity at a temptation challenge. Contestants make themselves an elimination target if they are a threat of losing a lot of weight by the end of the show. Elimination episodes screened on Mondays. Below is a table of voting history for what each contestant voted.

Week	Wk 1	Wk 2	Wk 3	Wk 4	Wk 5	Wk 6	Wk 7	Wk 8	Wk 9	Wk 10	Wk 11
Eliminated	Alex	Kelly	Michael	P'eta, Gerard	Marty	Greg / Mel	Laura	Marty	Damien, Courtney	Kimberlie	Munnalita
Chris	Arrived Wk 7 as an "Outsider"						Courtney	Marty	Courtney	Kimberlie	Munnalita
Marty	Alex	X	X	X	Courtney	Damien / Laura	Laura	X	Re-eliminated Wk 8, Re-returned Wk 10	Pati	Munnalita
Pati	Alex	X	X	X	Munnalita	Greg / Mel	Laura	?	Courtney	X	X
Munnalita	Alex	X	X	P'eta	Marty	Greg / Mel	X	Marty	X	Kimberlie	Eliminated Wk 11
Kimberlie	Arrived Wk 7 as an "Outsider"						Laura	?	?	X	Eliminated Wk 10
Courtney	Alex	X	X	X	Marty	Greg / Mel	X	Marty	X	Eliminated Wk 9	
Damien	X	Kelly	Laura	?	X	X	X	X	X	Eliminated mid Wk 9	
Laura	Arrived Wk 2	X	Gerard	Gerard	X	X	X	Eliminated Wk 7			
Mel	X	Kelly	X	Gerard	X	X	Eliminated Wk 6 (Double elimination)				
Greg	?	X	X	X	Courtney	X	Eliminated Wk 6 (Double elimination)				
Jules	X	Kelly	Michael	Gerard	Withdrew mid Wk 5 (on medical advice)						
Gerard	X	Michael	Michael	?	Eliminated Wk 4						
P'eta	Arrived Wk 2	?	Michael	?	Eliminated mid Wk 4 "The Walk"						
Michael	X	Damien	Gerard	Eliminated Wk 3							
Kelly	X	Mel	Eliminated Wk 2								
Sam	X	Withdrew mid Wk 2 (on medical advice)									
Alex	Munnalita	Eliminated Wk 1									
Sarah	Quit mid Wk 1										

Immunity
X Immunity, unable to vote
X Below yellow line, unable to vote
X Finished last in the elimination challenge, eliminated
X Not in elimination, unable to vote
? Vote not revealed
Eliminated or not in house
Last person eliminated before the finale
Valid vote cast
Elimination notes

- Sarah quit in week 1 due to feeling isolated from the rest of the group. All four trainers and former contestant Cat from season 1 failed to convince her to stay in the game.
- Sam withdrew in week 1 due to deep vein thrombosis.
- P'eta was unexpectedly eliminated as part of a twist introduced by "The Walk". Munnalita had the choice to eliminate a female contestant and chose P'eta.
- Jules withdrew in week 5 due to irregular heart patterns. Despite the contestants wanting her to stay, the on-site medic advised her to leave the game.
- Damien was eliminated in week 9 as a result of a Super Challenge. The penalty for losing the challenge was to be immediately eliminated.
- Damien's elimination marked the first time that an entire team was eliminated before the finale. He and Laura returned two weeks later and were eliminated again. With their eliminations, trainers Bob and Shannan had lost their entire team, and thus they both were also eliminated from the competition, as they had no other contestants to represent them at the finale. However, both trainers still remained in the house to train their former rival contestants.
- Marty was also eliminated twice. His first elimination was by a "hung" or tied vote in week 5, giving the voting decision to the other team. Upon returning to the game, Marty secured immunity in week 8 but was voted out as he had gained weight at the weigh-in, stripping him of his eligibility of immunity, and was subsequently re-eliminated. He also returned twice, returning again in week 10 after his second elimination, and went on to become a finalist.
- Chris and Pati are the only contestants to have not been eliminated, but Pati is the only contestant to be in the game for the entire length of the season, Chris entered the game in week 6.

=== Minor challenges ===
Contestants must compete in challenges to earn individual or team rewards. These rewards often lead to giving contestants power to change the outcome of the game with weight advantages or penalties, or individual personal prizes generally awarded by the shows advertising suppliers or sponsors. Generally, minor challenges were screened on Tuesday nights.

Week	Challenge	Reward(s)	Penalty	Winner(s)	Loser(s)	Notes	Description
1	Cinema	Massages	Spend the night outside	Blue team	Red team		Contestants were taken to the Cremorne Orpheum Cinema where they raced against each other, choosing food products that were lower in calories.
2	Beach Volleyball	3 course banquet	go on frozen meals and TV dinners for 24 hours	Red team	Blue team	The Blue team won the 1st set. The red team won the 2nd set and won the final match point equalling victory	Contestants played beach volleyball against each other.
3	Treadmill	A cardiology gym, and team session with the commando		Red Team (Greg)	-	Greg walked for over 2 hours, walking an extra 5 minutes after the second place holder	3 contestants for each team competed to see who could last the longest on a treadmill going 8 km/h
4	Jump and Duck Obstacle	The choice of training with the Commando or an afternoon at a Baha'i Temple, giving either other to the other team.		Red Team	Blue Team	The red team won and chose to go to the temple leaving the blue team to face the Commando. Also the red team got a bonus DVD on what happens in the kitchens in the house when no one is looking.	Teams had to duck and jump over spinning bars, beating 5 contestants in a row.
5	Basketball match	Messages from home	Commando training	Red team	Blue team	The Blue team were in the lead the entire game until red caught up in the dying minutes of play.	Teams competed against each other in a game of basketball game, each team coached by a member of the Sydney Kings.
6	The Power balls Challenge	The power to choose duos, LG 32-Inch Plasma TV, LG Notebook Computer	no choice of the pairs	Damien	-	Duos were to be picked with male and females paired. This would single out one female to be alone.	Contestants each had 10 heavy balls in their enclosure and had to get all balls in their area to win.
7	Commando Challenge	1 kg advantage	1 kg penalty, outsiders lose immunity	Courtney and Munnalita	Damien and Laura	Courtney and Munnalita received the Commando as part of The Walk	

=== Major Challenges ===
Contestants compete in more demanding physical, mental or tempting challenges giving contestants more significant prizes than those awarded with minor challenges giving contestants power to change the outcome of the game, change team setup, or earn immunity. Generally, major challenges were screened as a cliffhanger episode on Friday nights.

Week	Challenge	Reward(s)	Penalty	Winner(s)	Loser(s)	Notes	Description
1	Sydney Tower Climb	Choice of lunch at restaurant or paddle on a kayak boat	5 kg team weigh-in penalty	Blue team	Red team	The Blue Team chose lunch	Teams were taken to Sydney Tower where they raced against each other- 50 laps round the tower
2	Plane pull	Power to choose what team the new contestants would be placed, Letters from Home	lose their dignity, letters from home and choice of team member	Blue team	Red team	The Blue team chose P'eta	Teams raced to pull a 9-tonne DC3 aircraft 150 metres, stopping periodically for individual running sequences.
3	Beach obstacle	Phone calls to loved ones	No trainer for the last chance workout.	Blue team	Red team	Blue won only by a narrow margin and also let the Red team call	Teams compete on a beach obstacle course to fill up sacks with sand and dig holes to get through the course.
4	Moving house	An LG product for each team member, and the power to decide which member of the red team will become a blue.	No choice of whom to swap to oppisite team	Red team	Blue team	The Red team chose to swap Mel, who was previously swapped into Red from Blue.	Teams competed against each other to remove all contents from one house into another.
5	Heartbreak Hill	The choice between returning gym equipment or training with the Commando	-	Red team	Blue team		Teams had to run a relay 200 times up and down a steep hill with weights
6	Hangman Challenge	1 kg weigh-in advantage	1 kg weigh-in penalty	Damien & Laura	Courtney & Munnalita	2nd place: Greg & Mel, 3rd place: Marty & Pati	Contestants had to fill a 15-liter container with water by raising and lowering their paired contestants using a pulley system and transferring water from a container on the ground using just 1 cup.
7	Wood Challenge	Massages and two Vanuatu holidays	24 hours lock down, no trainer or gym	Marty and Pati	Damien and Laura	2nd place: Chris and Kimberlie, 3rd place: Courtney and Munnalita. Marty and Pati finished in 4 hours, 50 minutes.	Contestants had to shift 4 tonnes of wood from one spot to another by hand while being chained to their pair.

=== Temptation ===
Contestants competes in a temptation challenge to secure their place in the game for another week by gaining immunity making them unable to be voted out unless they gain weight. Challenges are generally psychologically based and gave contestants the choice to act against temptations they would otherwise participate in. This is a strategic part of the game. Temptation challenges were generally screened on Wednesday nights.

Week	Challenge	Reward(s)	Winner(s)	Notes	Description
1	Choice	Immunity and power of The Walk	Courtney	Contestants had to decide whether to eat the food or not in private. Last one left wins. Courtney only ate one slice of watermelon after everyone else backed away for immunity.	
2	Pizza	Immunity, an LCD TV courtsy of LG and power of The Walk	Gerard	The pizza got smaller in slice and the challenge can only happen if all eight slices are taken. Gerrard was the only one taking part in the challenge and ate a whole pizza after it shrunk in size.	Contestants must pick a slice of pizza for a 1 in 8 chance of immunity.
3	Chocolate	Immunity and power of The Walk	Pati	Pati participated as part of a team strategy, only one other contestant participated and that was Michael. Pati chose celery pieces in the temptation.	Contestants ate sticks of food dipped in chocolate. The winner was determined by the one who ate the most.
4	Sushi Train	Immunity and power of The Walk, 5 massages, a $4000 barbecue, a trampoline, a DVD player & a home video from the contestant's family	Munnalita	This was the first and only temptation challenge where all contestants participated in this temptation	Contestants must choose random plates of meals from a sushi train.
5	Food deli	Immunity and power of The Walk	Courtney	Other contestants chose to eat certain foods also. Unfortunately, after the trainers found out about the challenge, Munnalita cried when Michelle told her off that she ate two Mars bars. Munnalita countered saying that why she couldn't eat Mars bars after able to resisted eating other foods like chips and very high calorie foods.	Contestants were individually tempted with their favorite foods, the winner being the one who consumed the most calories.
6			Chris & Kimberlie	Chris and Kimberlie would lose immunity if they came last in the challenge.	
7	Chocolate		Marty	Marty was stripped of his immunity after gaining weight.	

=== "The Walk" ===
As an addition to receiving immunity, contestants also receive the power of "The Walk" which gave them the choice to change the game from options provided to them. "The Walk" was generally screened on Thursday nights.

Week	Contestant(s) with power	Options	Result
1	Courtney	24-hour training prior to the first weigh-in	Alex received additional training with Jillian.
2	Gerard	To choose 2 new contestants to enter the game	Laura and P'eta were chosen to enter the game, Jess and Kelli could not participate any further in the game.
3	Pati	To swap 1 member of the blue team for 1 member of the red team.	Pati switched Laura from the Red Team for Mel from the Blue Team.
4	Munnalita	To immediately vote out a player	Munnalita had to vote out a female. Other options included you must vote someone from the red team, the blue team, or a male. Munnalita voted out P'eta.
5	Courtney	To give immunity to a Blue team member	Other options included to give up immunity to a red team member, male or female. Courtney lost immunity and gave it to Damien. Originally, Laura wanted it knowing that she would be the next to go. The other members of the blue team made a pact that they would take Courtney to the finals if they picked Mel for immunity. Courtney selected Damien by random pick and angered all the members from the blue team.
6	None		
7	Chris & Kimberlie	To give the Commando to another duo for the next challenge	Other options included, a team will receive a five-minute time advantage, a five-minute time penalty, or to give anyone (including themselves) the Commando. Courtney and Munnalita received the Commando.

=== Finale ===
The finale was a pre-recorded show which aired on 6 April 2007.

Final 3 Contestants: Non-eliminated contestants competed for the "crown" and official label of "Australia's Biggest Loser for 2007", the winner being Chris losing a total of 70.1 kg (46.89% of his start weight).

Contestant	Start Weight (kg)	Starting BMI	Ending BMI	Finale (kg)	Total loss (kg/%)	Goal (kg)	Goal Difference
Chris	149.5	38.1	20.3	79.4	70.1 (46.89%)	90	-10.6
Marty	160.6	43.1	25.4	94.7	65.9 (41.03%)	95	-0.3
Pati	120.2	40.6	24.4	72.2	48.0 (39.93%)	70	2.2

Runner-up Contestants: All other contestants (excluding Sam, Jules and Sarah) weighed in against each other for the runner-up prize of A$50,000. The winner by a small margin was Michael, closely followed by Munnalita.

Contestant	Start Weight (kg)	Starting BMI	Ending BMI	Finale (kg)	Total loss (kg/%)	Goal (kg)	Goal Difference
Michael	165.2	44.8	25.8	95.2	70.0 (42.37%)	99	-3.8
Munnalita	127.3	44.0	25.6	74.1	53.2 (41.79%)	60	14.1
Damien	216.3	61.2	40.1	141.7	74.6 (34.49%)	110	31.7
Kimberlie	141.8	47.4	31.7	95.0	46.8 (33.00%)	99	-4.0
Greg	148.8	48.6	32.6	99.9	48.9 (32.86%)	90	9.9
Gerard	133.5	43.6	29.5	90.2	43.3 (32.43%)	85	5.2
Courtney	139.2	40.7	28.7	98.3	40.9 (29.38%)	90	8.3
Mel	108.4	32.4	23.3	78.0	30.4 (28.04%)	75	3.0
Alex	155.2	55.6	40.7	113.4	41.8 (26.93%)	95	18.4
Kelly	117.1	38.7	29.4	89.1	28.0 (23.91%)	70	19.1
Laura	109.2	35.7	27.5	84.2	25.0 (22.89%)	70	14.2
P'eta	131.6	41.1	33.3	106.7	24.9 (18.92%)	75	31.7

Disqualified contestants: Contestants Jules and Sam weighed in at the Finale but their results were not counted towards the runners-up prize as they were disqualified from play as they withdrew from the game, even though it was for medical reasons. Sarah did not make a finale appearance.

Contestant	Start Weight (kg)	Starting BMI	Ending BMI	Finale (kg)	Total loss (kg/%)	Goal (kg)	Goal Difference
Sam	128.0	43.8	29.9	87.4	40.6 (31.72%)	79	8.4
Jules	126.3	43.7	31.7	91.6	34.9 (27.59%)	75	16.6
Sarah	153.3	53.0	x	DNQ		75	DNQ

== Cast and personalities ==
=== Host ===
Ajay Rochester returned to the second season reprising her role as host of the show. Ajay has since stated goals for herself after the completion of this season, moving into hosting a radio show. Before the show went to air, Ajay was under the spotlight for her own weight. During primary production of the show, Ajay appeared on Network Ten's New Years celebrations.

=== Trainers ===
- Bob Harper (US trainer)
- Jillian Michaels (US trainer)
- Michelle Bridges (New Australian trainer)
- Shannan Ponton (New Australian trainer)
- Steve Willis (Australian Commando)
- Professor Clare Collins (Nutritionist and dietitian)

=== Contestants ===
14 contestants started the game, 2 more than the previous season. As a result of contestant withdrawal, "The Outsiders" and replacements, the total number of contestants was 18.

== Contestants ==
Contestants are listed in chronological order of elimination.

Contestant	Age	Hometown	Occupation	Team	Status
Sarah Peak	24	Carlingford, New South Wales	Online Account Manager	Red Team	Quit Week 1
Alex Tsao	37	Ringwood North, Victoria	Chef	Red Team	Eliminated Week 1
Sam Birrell	37	Bell Park, Victoria	Gym Manager	Blue Team	Withdrew Week 2^{[W1]}
Kelly Donaghy Lewis	28	Caringbah, Victoria	Police Detective	Blue Team	Eliminated Week 2
Michael Hinde	28	Adelaide, South Australia	Tax Officer	Blue Team	Eliminated Week 3 Runners-Up Prize Winner ($50,000)
P'eta Phelan	27	Melbourne, Victoria	Lecturer	Blue Team	Joined Week 2^{[R]} Eliminated mid Week 4^{[E1]}
Gerard Fleischer	44	Bentley, Western Australia	Sales Rep	Blue Team	Eliminated Week 4
Jules Condon	34	Gordonvale, Queensland	Mother of Three	Blue Team	Withdrew mid-Week 6^{[W2]} Trainer's Choice Award
Greg Koutsovidis	33	Glynde, South Australia	Fast Food Shop Owner	Red Team	Eliminated Week 6
Mellisa "Mel" Russell	24	Wollongong, New South Wales	Advertising Coordinator	Blue Team^{[T1]}	Eliminated Week 6
Laura Kufersin	20	Melbourne, Victoria	Beauty Therapist	Blue Team^{[T2]}	Joined Week 2^{[R]} Eliminated Week 7
Damien Wicks	34	Larrakeyah, Northern Territory	Musician	Blue Team	Eliminated mid Week 9^{[E2]}
Courtney Jackson	21	Varsity Lakes, Queensland	Retail Assistant	Red Team	Eliminated Week 9
Kimberlie Stewart	32	Sydney, New South Wales	Chief Financial Officer	Outsiders^{[O]}	Entered White House Week 7 Eliminated Week 10
Munnalita Kyrimis	32	Mount Gambier, South Australia	Hairdresser	Red Team	Eliminated Week 11
Patima "Pati" Singe	26	Bayview Heights, Queensland	Public Service Manager	Red Team	3rd place ($20,000)
Marty Barrett	38	Cleveland, Queensland	Coach Tour Guide	Red Team	Eliminated Week 5^{[E3]} Returned Week 6 Eliminated Week 8^{[E4]} Returned Week 10; 2nd Place ($30,000)
Chris Garling	23	Sydney, New South Wales	Student	Outsiders^{[O]}	Entered White House Week 7 Biggest Loser ($200,000)

^[W1]Sam was diagnosed with deep vein thrombosis after the week 1 weigh-in and withdrew from the game.

^[R]Laura and P'eta entered the White House in week 2 to replace Sarah and Sam. ^[E1]P'eta was eliminated mid-week by Munnalita due to The Walk, when she was asked to eliminate one female player.

^[E2]Damien was eliminated mid-week 9 due to finishing last in the Super Challenge that week

^[E3]Marty was eliminated in Week 5, but rejoined in Week 6 due to Jules' withdrawal

^[E4]Marty was eliminated again in week 8, but rejoined in week 10 by winning the eliminated contestant weigh-in.

^[T1]Mel started on the Blue Team, but was swapped to the Red Team in Week 3 by Pati due to The Walk; she rejoined the Blue Team in Week 4 after the Red Team won the challenge

^[T2]Laura joined the Red Team when she entered the White House, but was swapped to the Blue Team in week 3 by Pati due to The Walk

^[W2]Jules withdrew mid-week 5 due to a heart condition.

^[O]Kimberlie and Chris weighed in at the White House in week 1, but went home and were kept a secret until they entered the White House in week 7.

== Replacement Contestants ==
The replacement contestants were selected from a choice of four people as part of "The Walk".

The two people that did not become contestants were Jess and Kelli. Laura and P'eta joined the team.

Contestant	Age	Hometown	Height	Goal Weight
Kelli Harvey	26	Brisbane, QLD	180 cm	68 kg
Jess Balding	22	TAS		
Laura Kufersin	20	Melbourne, VIC	175 cm	70 kg
P'eta Phelan	27	Melbourne, VIC	179 cm	75 kg

=== Team arrangements ===
Teams: The show started with two teams, "Blue Team" trained by Bob and Shannan and "Red Team" trained by Jillian and Michelle. The Australian trainers entered the game and individually the contestants chose their trainers, with the heaviest contestant choosing first (Damien) and the lightest choosing last (Mel). Bob and Jillian then entered and joined the Shannan and Michelle respectively as co-trainers. As teams became uneven throughout the game, some challenge rewards or penalties were to swap team members which retained even numbers for teams to compete fairly.

Duos: With 8 contestants remaining, teams were broken into 4 pairs of male and female contestants. Damien won the power to choose teams as a result of a minor challenge. At this stage of the game, Jules left the game making an uneven number of contestants, leaving Damien with the decision to leave one contestant to compete by themselves. The pairs grouped together were: Damien and Laura, Greg and Mel, Courtney and Munnalita, and Pati was left by herself which introduced a new twist. The biggest weight loser of all eliminated contestants returned to the game, this being Marty who was only just eliminated the day before. Greg and Mel were eliminated as part of a double elimination, and were replaced by new contestants Chris and Kimberlie, introduced as "The Outsiders".

Individuals: With 7 contestants remaining (including the new "The Outsiders"), pairs no longer existed and contestants competed in all challenges individually.

Final 4: The final four contestants were Chris, Kimberlie, Pati and Munnalita. As a result of the "wild card" challenge, contestant Marty returned to the game and replaced eliminated contestant Kimberlie, making Marty part of the final 4 contestants.

== Production and release ==
=== Filming locations ===
Filming of The Biggest Loser was primarily located in Sydney, NSW, Australia. The main filming locations seen throughout the show are the White House (where contestants reside and train), the "Outsider" training ranch (where "The Outsiders" trained before entering the house), the elimination room (a room inside the house where votes are cast for contestants to be eliminated from the game) and the diary room (a studio set up for contestants to leave video entries of their time in the house). Other game locations include "The Walk" which was filmed around Bobbin Head National Park, Turramurra, NSW. Other filming locations include areas around the house gardens for individual contestant interviews. There are also filming locations at South Sydney beaches and other areas where challenges take place. Areas of Queenstown, New Zealand were also primary filming locations as part of the New Zealand Super Challenge, the focus points being the hike and sprint up Coronet Peak and the Super Challenge at Paradise. There are also the studios for the live finale reunion.

=== Filming dates ===
There are three main dates organised around the production of the show including the application and audition process, primary photography and production and the show finale which occurs 6 weeks after the final week of primary photography (the tenth week of game play), and was filmed on Monday, 23 April (instead of a live show like the previous season).

=== Air dates and channels ===
This season began airing on Sunday 4 February 2007 at 7:00pm on Network Ten, five episodes each week night, with an additional sixth episode introduced on Sunday nights. After a total of 67 episodes (10 × 6 weeklies) the pre-taped finale episode screened on 26 April 2007.

=== Credits and associations ===
The Biggest Loser is a trademark of Reveille LLC and is licensed and produced by FremantleMedia Australia Pty Limited. In Australia it is distributed by Crackerjack Productions, Grundy-Fremantle Media Group and Network Ten Australia. Among others, the major sponsors and suppliers that were explicitly credited were 100% Pure newzealand.com, Accredited Practising Dieticians, Air New Zealand, Brooks, Chrysler, Fernwood Health Club, LG Electronics, Workout World and Valiant Hire.

== Reception and public response ==
=== Controversies ===
Casey Donovan: Before the show went to air, there were some controversies when allegations emerged that morbidly obese singer and Australian Idol series two winner Casey Donovan had applied to be a contestant and had been rejected. Network Ten dismissed these allegations, arguing that Donovan had simply not survived the application process.

Health risks: The show received further criticism, being attacked by exercise experts for promoting risky weight loss techniques that may endanger the show's viewers. There was also much criticism when news leaked of contestant Jules, then unknown, was forced to quit after multiple health scares and hospital visits. An eating disorders support group, The Butterfly Foundation, commenting on Chris's achievement, warned that such a dramatic weight loss could be a health risk.

New trainers: With Shannan and Michelle introduced, this was a tactic to make sure that in the future series of the Biggest Loser, the two trainers will be Shannan and Michelle. By doing this, they hope that the Australian public can appreciate them as much as Bob and Jillian and to make future series of Biggest Loser an all Australian cast.

=== Reviews ===
The length of the show compared to the American version was accused of being too "bloated" with over 3 hours of extra footage for each "episode" or week, but at the same time, the type of participants used in the show are a good change from regular reality television "wannabes".

=== Television viewing and ratings ===
The show averaged more than 1,000,000 viewers each night, peaking around 1.56 million viewers for one weigh-in show and 1.31 million viewers for one elimination show. The season premiere attracted only 1.17 million viewers compared to the first-season premiere of 1.4 million, although depending on what was happening with the Cricket on Channel Nine, the total audience peaked at 1.45 million. The ratings were considered a great success by the network, receiving a large portion of the target demographic (39.2% commercial share in demographic ages 18–49, and 42.6% of the 16-39 demographic). The season finale was the ratings success, being the highest rating episode of the show and ranking number 1 for the day with 1,995,000 viewers.

The following are some of the ratings achieved from the highest-rated episodes. Unless otherwise stated, sources are gathered from OzTAM as a primary or secondary source.

Episode name	Total viewers (Rounded to nearest 1000)	Original airdate
Season Premiere	1,170,000 (peaking at 1.45m)	Sunday, 4 February
The Weigh-in (#8)	1,560,000	Sunday, 1 April
Elimination (#9)	1,319,000	Monday, 9 April
The Weigh-in (#10)	1,310,000	Sunday, 15 April
Elimination (#10)	1,302,000	Monday, 16 April
The Final Weigh-in and Elimination	1,323,000	Thursday, 19 April
The Finale	1,995,000	Thursday, 26 April
