= Inthemix =

Former online music publication

inthemix
- Website type: Online music magazine/dance music portal
- Available in: English
- Headquarters: {{{location_country}}}
- Owner: Junkee Media (formerly Sound Alliance)
- Creators: Andre Lackmann, Libby Clark, Matt Callander (initial)
- Website: inthemix.com.au (archived)
- Commercial: Yes
- Launched: 1999
- Current status: Defunct

inthemix (styled as inthemix.com.au) was an Australian online publication and social community focused on electronic dance music, club culture, and related industry news. Established in 1999, it served as the primary central hub for the Australian dance music community for nearly two decades before its closure in 2018. The publication was the foundation for the publishing house Sound Alliance, which later rebranded as Junkee Media and was acquired by oOh!media.

== History ==
The site was launched in 1999 by Andre Lackmann and Libby Clark, originally to document the underground rave and club culture in Sydney through photography and community forums. During the early 2000s, it played a significant role in documenting the Australian electronic scene at a time when mainstream media coverage of the genre was limited.

Following the site's success, the founders established Sound Alliance, a digital media company that launched other niche titles including FasterLouder. Sound Alliance formally rebranded as Junkee Media in July 2015. The site officially ceased operations in November 2018, with its editorial legacy absorbed into Music Junkee.

== Features and Community ==
Initially launched as a platform for sharing photographs of Sydney's underground club scene, inthemix evolved into a comprehensive digital media platform with several distinct sections:

- Community Forums: The site's forums were a central networking hub for the Australian electronic music community. At their peak, they were used by DJs, promoters, and fans to discuss music production, event logistics, and subculture trends. Editorial staff later described the forums as the "unwieldy" but essential foundation of the site's growth.
- Event Photography and Listings: The site maintained an extensive archive of event photography, documenting both major festivals and local club nights across Australia. Its event listings were categorized by state capital (Adelaide, Brisbane, Canberra, Melbourne, Perth, and Sydney), providing localized information and online ticket sales for regional scenes.
- Editorial and News: As the site professionalized, it developed a full editorial team that provided domestic and international dance music news, artist interviews, and technical reviews of DJ equipment.

== Cultural Impact and Legacy ==
inthemix is frequently cited as a significant record of Australian digital and music culture. The National Library of Australia selected the site for its PANDORA electronic collection, archiving it as a publication of national significance.

The publication has also been utilized as a primary source in academic research regarding Australian performance practice and subcultures, including the Southern Cross University study Human Machine Music (2010), which examined the site's role as a networking and information hub for the "neo-tribes" of the Sydney rave scene.

The annual inthemix Awards (formerly the Sony inthemix50) served as a major industry benchmark for nearly 15 years. The awards were widely reported by national outlets such as Rolling Stone Australia and The Music, helping to launch the careers of artists like the Stafford Brothers and Tigerlily.
