= Brian Coleman (footballer, born 1935) =

Australian rules footballer (born 1935)

Personal information
- Full name: Brian H. Coleman
- Born: 28 May 1935
- Original team: Camberwell
- Height: 175 cm (5 ft 9 in)
- Weight: 80 kg (176 lb)

Playing career^{1}
Years	Club	Games (Goals)
1959	Hawthorn	6 (5)
- ^{1} Playing statistics correct to the end of 1959.

Career highlights
- Hawthorn Hall of Fame

Brian H. Coleman (born 28 May 1935) is a former Australian rules footballer who played with Hawthorn in the Victorian Football League (VFL).

Coleman played six senior games for Hawthorn, all in the 1959 VFL season. He was recruited from Camberwell where he played 49 senior games.

== Coaching ==
He later served as coach of the Hawthorn Under-19s, he was the only coach to win a premiership for the club, in 1972.

== Chairman of Selectors ==
From 1983 to 1995, Coleman was the Chairman of Selectors at Hawthorn. It was most successful period in Hawthorn's history, winning five premierships and playing finals every year.

== Club President ==
In 1995, the finances at Hawthorn were deteriorating, boardroom largesse was revealed, and pressure was put upon president Geoff Lord to resign. Coleman was elevated to clean up the finances. Coleman was club president in 1996. He presided over, and supported, the planned merger between Hawthorn and Melbourne in 1996. After losing the vote to merge the clubs, Coleman stepped down s president and was replaced by Ian Dicker.

== Honours and achievements ==
Individual

- Hawthorn Hall of Fame
- Hawthorn life member
