= Goodlife Health Clubs =

Chain of health clubs

- Industry: Fitness
- Founded: 2002; 24 years ago
- Founder: Leon McNiece
- Area served: Australia
- Parent: Fitness and Lifestyle Group
- Website: goodlife.com.au

Goodlife Health Clubs is a chain of health clubs, with more than 80 locations in Australia.

== History ==
Leon McNiece founded Goodlife Health Clubs in 2002 in Queensland. McNiece sold a 53 per cent stake in the business to wealth management firm Colonial First State in 2006. However, Colonial soon decided to close its private equity division and put Goodlife up for sale.

In September 2007, Macquarie Leisure Trust acquired Goodlife Health Clubs for $60 million. At the time, Goodlife had 18 health clubs across Queensland, Victoria and New South Wales. In March 2008, Macquarie Leisure purchased the Zest Health Clubs chain for $7.4 million, allowing it to expand Goodlife to South Australia and grow its Queensland footprint. In August 2009, Macquarie Leisure Trust was renamed Ardent Leisure Group. In January 2010, Ardent acquired seven of Zest's Western Australian health clubs for $4.2 million in cash and stock. The locations were rebranded to Goodlife Health Clubs.

In August 2016, Ardent sold the 76-club Goodlife business to Quadrant Private Equity for $260 million, forming part of its Fitness and Lifestyle Group.

In 2023 members of the United Workers Union launched a campaign against underpayment, wage cuts, and poor work conditions at over 150 Fitness First and Goodlife Health Clubs. Within a few months instructors successfully pressured management to concede to their demands.

== See also ==
- Australian Institute of Personal Trainers
