= Junkee Media =

Australian digital media company, founded 2000

- Formerly: Sound Alliance
- Industry: Digital media
- Founded: 2000; 26 years ago
- Headquarters: Surry Hills, New South Wales, Australia
- Key people: Piers Grove, Publisher
- Products: Junkee; Punkee; AWOL
- Parent: RACAT Group
- Website: junkeemedia.com

Junkee Media, formerly known as Sound Alliance, is a digital media company based in Australia.

== History ==
Junkee Media was founded in 2000 when Matt Callander, Libby Clark, and Andre Lackmann launched their dance music website inthemix. The website began as a part-time hobby for the three, who were soon joined by Neil Ackland. Ackland discovered the site online and got in touch with its creators.

Sound Alliance acquired Mess+Noise in October 2008 from failed media group Destra Corporation. Mess+Noise has been operating since 2005 when it began as a bimonthly print publication. In 2006, Tim Duggan co-founded the national LGBT site Same Same with Sound Alliance.

Sound Alliance launched Junkee in March 2013, an online title aimed at an audience aged 18 to 29 years. Sound Alliance used Junkee to trial native advertising, which is now used across all of its publications as of October 2014.

Sound Alliance formally rebranded itself as Junkee Media in July 2015. CEO Neil Ackland told media the name change reflected the company's transformation from being a music-only publisher to becoming a youth-focused lifestyle publisher. In September 2015, Junkee Media sold the LGBT title Same Same to Evo Media.

In 2016, oOh! Media purchased an 85% shareholding in Junkee Media. It acquired the remaining 15% several years later.

In April 2017, FasterLouder was rebranded to Music Junkee, and a new site targeting Generation Z, Punkee, was launched the following month. In November 2018, Junkee Media closed down Inthemix after 18 years.

In December 2021, Junkee Media was sold to RACAT Group. Oh!media retained Junkee's branded content and production arm, Junkee Studio.

== Digital publications ==
- Junkee - launched in 2013 as a pop culture and political satire site targeting 18- to 29-year-olds
- AWOL - launched in 2014 as a youth travel site, produced in partnership with Qantas
- Punkee - launched in 2017 as an entertainment and pop culture site aimed at 16- to 24-year-olds; refocused in December 2024to focus on social-first content.
- The Phodcast - released in October 2025, a one-off four episode podcast mini-series

== Awards ==
Junkee was named media brand of the year at the 2014 Mumbrella Awards. Qantas and Junkee Media's AWOL was named the content marketing strategy of the year in 2015.

In 2011, Sound Alliance was named to the Digital Media Top 10 Power Index.

Sound Alliance was named one of Australia's best places to work in both 2010 and 2009 by the publication BRW.

Punkee was named the media brand of the year at the 2018 Mumbrella Awards. Junkee Media was named publishing company of the year - large publishers at the 2018 Publish Awards.
