= APN Outdoor =

Australian company

- Founded: 2004; 22 years ago
- Defunct: 2018
- Headquarters: Sydney, Australia
- Products: Outdoor advertising
- Parent: JCDecaux
- Website: www.apnoutdoor.com.au

APN Outdoor was an Australian outdoor advertising company based in Sydney, Australia.

== History ==
Former APN Outdoor logo

APN Outdoor was founded by APN News & Media in 2004 when it consolidated the operations of its acquired outdoor ad firms Cody, Australian Posters and Buspak.

In 2011, APN News & Media sold half the business to Quadrant Private Equity, and in 2015 sold the other half. This severed business links from APN News & Media, despite retaining the name "APN", which caused some confusion in the market until APN News & Media rebranded as Here, There & Everywhere in 2017.

The business was listed on the Australian Securities Exchange in 2014. At the time of listing, Quadrant retained a 20% stake in the company and management held 2.5%.

Richard Herring was CEO of the company from its founding until retiring after 22 years in 2017. James Warburton became CEO in 2017.

In 2017, APN Outdoor planned to merge with rival outdoor advertising company oOh!media, however was aborted after the Australian Competition & Consumer Commission raised preliminary concerns.

In June 2018, JCDecaux made a takeover bid worth $1.1 billion, suggesting APN Outdoor would complement the former's existing Australian assets. The takeover was approved in late 2018, shortly after which APN Outdoor ceased trading on the ASX and became a subsidiary of JCDecaux with the latter's branding adopted.
