= Ben Gray =

Australian businessman

- Occupation: Businessman

Ben Gray is an Australian businessman who is a founding partner of the private equity firm BGH Capital.

== Career ==
In 2015 Ben publicly announced that he was preparing to set up his own private equity firm. In 2017, he resigned from TPG Inc. and set up BGH capital with business partners Robin Bishop and Simon Harle.

He has publicly claimed that his investment approach is not a 'slash and burn' approach to investing.

In 2020, it was publicly reported by the AFR that a threat from James Packer had caused him to fear for his well-being following an attempt to take over the Crown casino business.

== Personal life ==
Ben is married to the Australian politician Luba Grigorovitch They own a $30m mansion named 'Westbank', a two-acre early 20th century limestone house built located in the coastal town of Sorrento, Victoria. His father is former Tasmanian premier Robin Gray
