= Australian Institute of Fitness =

Australian fitness training organisation

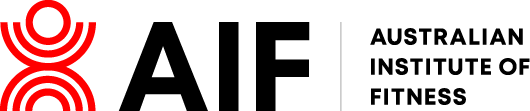
- Other names: AIF
- Former names: ACHPER Fitness Leader; Australian Fitness Network; Institute for Fitness Professionals; National College of Fitness; the Australian Institute of Fitness
- Type: Registered training organisation
- Established: 1979
- Founders: Greg Hurst, Nigel Champion, Russell Creagh
- Parent institution: Clean Health Group
- Chairman: Daine McDonald
- Chief Executive Officer: Daine McDonald
- Location: Australia
- Website: fitness.edu.au

The Australian Institute of Fitness (AIF) is a privately owned, registered training organisation, and one of the largest fitness training organisations in Australia. Beginning operations as the Health Studio Attendants course in Perth in 1979, the Institute became Australia's first national fitness training provider in 2000, with the merger of five state-based fitness training programs.

== History ==
In 1979, sports educator and author Nigel Champion began running a Health Studio Attendants course in Perth, the first of its kind in Australia. In 1981, Champion partnered with Australian academic Dr Garry Egger to establish the ACHPER Fitness Leader group of courses in Sydney; before joining, in 1986, with fitness entrepreneur Greg Hurst to establish the Australian Fitness Network. In 2000, Hurst & Champion together with Russell Creagh, Monty Dortkamp, Dr Grant Pavia and Kerry McEvoy, merged five existing fitness training programs – ACHPER Fitness Leader; Australian Fitness Network; Institute for Fitness Professionals; National College of Fitness; and the Australian Institute of Fitness – to create the national Australian Institute of Fitness (AIF).

Russell Creagh served as the first CEO of the consolidated AIF, from 2001 to 2006, followed by Greg Hurst (2006–2011) and Dyanne Ward (2011–2016). In December 2016, Steve Pettit, then CEO of AIF Queensland, was appointed as its National Chief Executive on the retirement of Dyanne Ward.

Since its inception, the founding entities provided a variety of fitness industry-specific certification and training courses. Following the Federal Government's 1996 training reform agenda, these courses were incorporated into the Australian Qualifications Framework. Since 1996, AIF has delivered nationally recognised qualifications in fitness, massage and business, in compliance with the regulatory standards of the Australian Qualifications Framework.

In early 2024, the AIF was acquired by Clean Health, the worlds trusted source of online education for fitness professionals which was Founded by Daine McDonald, signalling a new era for the company as it transitions into a 100% online fitness education business.

== Company overview ==
=== Board of directors ===
- Daine McDonald – CEO and Chairman [2024–present]
- Lauren McDonald – Vice Chairperson [2024–present]
- Nouri Groom – Chief Financial Officer [2018–present]
- Paul Siderovski [2024–present]

=== Ambassadors ===
- Michelle Bridges [2009 – 2017]
- Hayden Quinn [2015 – 2017]

== Courses and subjects ==
AIF is an Australian Registered Training Organisation (RTO) delivering vocational education and training (VET) courses at Certificate III, Certificate IV and Diploma level. Auditing and registration of Australian RTOs is managed by the Australian Skills Quality Authority (ASQA), as such AIF's programs must meet guidelines set out by State and Federal Governments and associated training bodies.

=== Registered training organisation ===
Australian Institute of Fitness (RTO ID 121508) is approved to deliver the following qualifications under the Australian Qualifications Framework:

- Certificate III in Fitness (SIS30315)
- Certificate IV in Fitness (SIS40215)
- Certificate IV in Nutrition (11046NAT)
- Diploma of Remedial Massage (HLT52015)

=== Programs and Courses offered ===
- Master Trainer Program™ (Certificate IV in Fitness SIS40215)
- Master Nutritionist Program™ (Certificate IV in Nutrition 11046NAT)
- Remedial Massage Therapist (Diploma of Remedial Massage HLT52015)

=== Monty Dortkamp Scholarships ===
The Monty Dortkamp Scholarship Program awards one scholarship annually covering the tuition costs of a Master Trainer Program™ certification. The scholarship was established by AIF in memory of Monty Dortkamp, to assist people from disadvantaged backgrounds and communities.

== Notable students and graduates ==
- Michelle Bridges – personal trainer, author and TV personality
- Kayla Itsines – Founder of the Bikini Body Guide and social media influencer
- Leisel Jones – Gold, silver and bronze medalist in Swimming at the 2000, 2004, 2008 and 2012 Olympic Games.
- Jayde Taylor – Olympian and Hockeyroo

== Industry Awards ==
Finalist 2015 NSW Training Awards – Large Training Provider of the Year

== See also ==
- Australian Fitness & Health Expo
- Australian Institute of Personal Trainers
