= Geoff Lord =

Australian businessman and investor (born 1945)

- Born: March 28, 1945 (age 81)
- Occupations: Chairman, Belgravia Group
- Spouse: Nanette Lord
- Children: 4

Geoffrey Fredrick Lord (born March 28 1945) is an Australian businessman and investor, best known as the founder, chairman, and chief executive of the Belgravia Group.

Lord is currently chairman or director of several publicly listed companies within Australia including ex-chairman and founder of UXC Limited, executive chairman of Tesserent LTD, non-executive and founding director of Judo Capital, director of the Melbourne Business School and chairman of Salvest.

Lord first appeared on the BRW Rich 200 in 2005 with a net worth of A$115 million. In 2020, Lord's net worth was assessed at A$569 million. Lord did not reach the threshold for inclusion on the 2021 Rich List. This is theorised to be due to his large holdings in difficult-to-measure private companies.

== Early life and education ==
Lord was born to a father who was a published author and insurance man. In regard to his childhood, Lord has previously called himself a "working class boy". He completed his high school education at Melbourne High School. He went on to study his bachelor of economics at Monash University, followed by a post-graduate at La Trobe University and a Master of Business Administration (Distinction) at the University of Melbourne.

== Career ==
Lord began his career in 1965 with the Ford Motor Company before joining Henry Jones IXL in 1973, where he was promoted to the Board in 1978. Lord served as a Director for several companies associated with the Elders Group until 1992, including Elders IXL and Foster's Brewing. In 1985, Lord established Elders Resources Limited, a public company, and was appointed as its chief executive and deputy chairman.

In 1992, Lord was cleared by the Australian Securities Commission in relation to the WA Companies and Securities Code and WA Inc. This decision came after Lord established that, having been overseas at the time of all issues, he could not have possibly attended such a meeting or been involved. As evidence, Lord produced his passport, airline tickets, hotel bills and minutes from the Elders Resources board meeting, which proved his absence from the country.

In 1990, Lord retired from Elders Resources. He cashed his Elders' bonus shares and used the AUD$11 million to create the Belgravia Group, a privately owned investment group that employs approximately 7,000 people across Australia and New Zealand, as of 2005. Belgravia Group is named for the location of Elders' London offices. Belgravia focuses on medium developments of under $50 million each, with many areas pertaining to different markets. In regards to the beginning of Belgravia, Lord said "I felt I had to start again. But to start again, I think you have to be prepared to eat some humble pie and start small, rather than continuing at the level where you were in a grand way. You have to go back to basics."

Sections of Belgravia include Belgravia Apparel, which manufactures uniforms for companies such as KFC, Burger King, Emirates, Virgin Atlantic, Coles, Woolworths, Officeworks. in addition to being responsible for all product manufacturing for New Balance in Australia.

In Addition to launching Belgravia, Lord put money into King Island Dairy and a property portfolio including Buckie Station.

As of 2003, Belgravia Leisure managed 80 community facilities for local governments.

== Sports Administration Career ==
Lord has been an active participant in the sports industry. He served as President of Hawthorn Football Club from 1993 to 1995, where he is a life member and helped the club win four premierships. In 2011, Lord contested the presidency once again but was defeated by then-vice-president, Andrew Newbold.

Lord also founded and served as chairman of the Melbourne Victory Football Club from 2004 to 2010, winning additional premierships with the club.

== Philosophy ==
In regards to operations at Belgravia, Lord said "Is Belgravia the most sensible business model in the world? That's not material to me because I'm not driven just by the money." and "Why're we doing this? Probably because I love it."

Lord keeps a low profile, reasoning that "I'm not out there trying to sell or promote Geoff Lord, probably because I'm scared and averse to what happened in the 1980s building megastars and seeing those megastars burned at the stake, a la John Elliott. That's the last thing I want to do draw attention to Geoff Lord."

Sporting positions
Preceded by Trevor Coote	Hawthorn Football Club President; 1993–1995	Succeeded by Brian Coleman
Sporting positions
Preceded by Office Established	Melbourne Victory Chairman; 2004-2010	Succeeded by Anthony Di Pietro
