= Judo Bank =

Australian Challenger Bank focused on small and medium-sized businesses

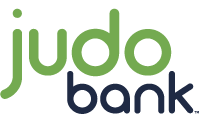
- Traded as: ASX: JDO
- Industry: Financial services
- Founded: October 16, 2016; 10 years ago
- Headquarters: Melbourne, Australia
- Key people: Joseph Healy (Chief Executive Officer), Peter Hodgson (Chairman)
- Products: Business Banking, Term Deposits, financial and related services: Business Loan, Line of Credit, Equipment Loan, Finance Lease, Home Loan, Personal Term Deposit, SME Guarantee Scheme Loans
- Website: www.judo.bank

Judo Bank is an Australian neobank focused on small and medium-sized enterprise lending but also offers a range of personal term deposit products to consumers.

As of January 2020, Judo Bank had lent $1B to Australian businesses and another $1B in digital retail term deposits.

== History ==
=== Foundation 2016-2019 ===
Judo was founded in 2016 with an initial seed investment from an Australian consortium of family offices, led by businessman Geoff Lord. It did a capital raising in 2018, the largest in Australia at that time, and launched as Judo Capital, raising more than $140 million from Australian and international investors, coordinated by Ironbridge Capital.

At this time a number of global investors bought shares in the bank, these included Ironbridge Capital, Canadian pension fund manager OPTrust, Myer Family Investments, Abu Dhabi Capital Group, Zhong Yi Investment and Credit Suisse Asset Management, Cambooya, Inception Asset Management, Esson and CH Warman Group.

That same year, former Australian Treasury Secretary John Fraser joined the board alongside former Federal Small Business Minister Bruce Billson. Credit Suisse increased their interest in Judo with a $350 million debt facility. This was followed by a $100 million facility from Goldman Sachs in April 2019.

=== Licensing 2019 ===
In April 2019, The Australian Prudential Regulation Authority announced it had granted Judo Bank Pty Ltd a licence to operate as an authorised deposit-taking institution (ADI) without restriction following its application in May 2018. As part of the licence grant, the business changed its name from Judo Capital to Judo Bank.

=== Further investment and growth 2019- ===
In June 2019, Judo Bank closed series B round raising $400 million, new investors now include the Paris and London fund Tikehau Capital, and the Boston-based alternative investment firm Bain Capital.

On Thursday, 2 April 2020, The Australian government announced that it would invest an initial $250 million into Judo Bank's lending warehouse through the Australian Office of Financial Management's (AOFM) Australian Business Securitisation Fund and a further $250 million through its recently announced Structured Finance Support Fund (SFSF). The investment from the AOFM made Judo Bank the first recipient of capital from the government's $2 billion small and medium enterprise funding scheme that was unveiled in November 2018.

In May 2020, Judo Bank had raised $230 million in fresh equity from existing investors at a post-money valuation of over $1 billion, giving the bank Unicorn status. Judo Bank was the first of the Australian challenger banks to reach this position.

In December 2020, Judo Bank was ranked among the top 10 independent neo-banks globally by WhiteSight's Top 20 neo-banks of 2020 research, which based the ranking of the neo-banks on valuation. Judo Bank was the only Australian bank to rank among the top 10 neo-banks.

== Operations ==
Judo follows the small and medium enterprises (SME) challenger bank model developed by Aldermore, Shawbrook Bank and OakNorth Bank in the UK.

== Political commentary ==
Small Business & Family Enterprise Ombudsman Kate Carnell says Judo Bank's launch is well-timed with the lending shortfall continuing to grow. "There is no competition", Carnell said. "The big four banks have 80 percent plus of the SME lending market and they mostly don't lend except if it is secured against property and that means access to capital is very difficult for many SMEs."

Australian Prime Minister, Scott Morrison gave a virtual speech at the Singapore FinTech Festival on 8 December 2020, speaking about fintechs' positive impact on the economic recovery, referring to Judo and four Australian fintechs in particular. "I am incredibly proud of what our Aussie start-ups and early age ventures are achieving, as well as our well-established unicorns and what they’re achieving. You know some of them: Atlassian, Airwallex, Afterpay, Judo Bank, Athena Home Loans."

== See also ==
- Banking in Australia
- List of banks
- List of banks in Australia
- List of banks in Oceania
