= BGH Capital =

Australian private equity company

- Industry: Private equity
- Founded: 2017; 9 years ago
- Founders: Robin Bishop; Ben Gray; Simon Harle
- Headquarters: Melbourne, Australia
- Website: https://www.bghcapital.com

BGH Capital (BGH) is an Australian private equity company established in 2017 by Robin Bishop, Ben Gray, and Simon Harle. BGH is headquartered in Melbourne and is owned and managed by its founding partners.

== History ==
Ben Gray and Simon Harle established and led the Australian and New Zealand private equity team at TPG Capital, while Robin Bishop was previously head of Macquarie Capital Australia and New Zealand.

BGH Capital Fund I had a final close of approximately A$2.6 billion in May 2018.

In 2019, BGH purchased Perth-based education provider Navitas in a $2.3 billion deal with AustralianSuper and invested in CyberCX, a cyber security services firm.

In 2020, BGH acquired Healius' medical practices (now known as ForHealth), purchased a stake in online travel agency TripADeal – a 51% stake in TripADeal was sold to Qantas in 2022 and the remainder in June 2024. – and acquired Abano Healthcare Group and a majority stake in Village Roadshow.

In 2021, BGH acquired dental chain 1300SMILES, and invested in Melbourne-based bakery Laurent and Australian chicken producer Hazeldene's.

In 2022, BGH acquired Bupa NZ's dental business and Virtus Health, which was de-listed from the ASX. It also took a stake in Pushpay.

BGH Capital Fund II achieved final close in February 2022 at A$3.6 billion. This is the largest private equity fund focused on Australia and New Zealand.

== Current investments ==
The following schedule indicates the businesses BGH continues to manage.

Investment	Year acquired	Description	Ref
Navitas	2019	Global education provider	
CyberCX	2019	Australian cyber security provider	
ForHealth	2020	Australian primary services care provider	
Abano Healthcare	2020	One of the largest dental networks in Australia and New Zealand	
Village Roadshow	2020	Entertainment and leisure business	
Laurent	2021	Melbourne-based wholesale and retail artisan bakery	
Hazeldene's	2021	Australian Poultry producer	
Virtus Health	2022	Provider of assisted reproductive services	
Pushpay	2023	Software and payments provider to faith-based sector	
Fusion5	2024	Australasian business applications technology specialist	

== See also ==
- Robin Gray (Australian politician) – father of BGH co-founder Ben Gray
