= Clarisonic =

Brand of skin-care devices

- Country: United States
- Introduced: 2004
- Markets: Worldwide

Clarisonic is a brand of skin-care devices, primarily known for its sonic facial cleansing brushes, originally developed by Pacific Bioscience Laboratories of Redmond, Washington. The brand and its parent company were acquired by L'Oréal in 2011. In 2018, Clarisonic devices made up 14% of the skin care device market. In July 2020, L'Oréal announced it would discontinue the Clarisonic brand and products, choosing instead to focus on other core business offerings. It is speculated that the actual cause was increasing competition from cheaper alternatives as the skin care device market grew.

== History ==
Pacific Bioscience Laboratories was founded in 2001 by David Giuliani, Robb Akridge, Steve Meginniss, Ward Harris, and Ken Pilcher. Giuliani, Clarisonic's CEO, is the former co-founder and CEO of Optiva, which developed the Sonicare line of toothbrushes. Giuliani sold Optiva to Philips Oral Healthcare in 2000. Akridge was a scientist at Optiva Corporation before co-founding Clarisonic. He holds a bachelor's degree from University of Texas, a Master of Science degree in biology from Texas State University–San Marcos and a doctorate in microbiology from Texas A&M University. Ken Pilcher is the lead inventor of Clarisonic's skin care systems. In the past, he has developed avionics for the NASA Space Shuttle, as well as medical electronics. Clarisonic was backed by angel groups including Keiretsu Forum who provided the seed capital for the company.

Pacific Bioscience Laboratories launched its first sonic facial-cleansing brush under the Clarisonic brand in 2004, which was later known as the Mia 1. In 2012, the company launched the Mia 2, featuring two different oscillating speeds. The company introduced the Alpha Fit, a black model marketed toward men, in 2015. This was followed in early 2016 by the Mia Fit, a compact version of the original device. In September 2016, L'Oréal announced the elimination of 120 employees at the Clarisonic manufacturing facility in Redmond, Washington, and would begin to outsource production of the devices.

== Awards and recognition ==
2012

- Glamour (magazine) Best Skin Device
- Allure (magazine) Best of Beauty
