= Virtus Health =

- Parent: BGH Capital
- Website: www.virtushealth.com.au

Virtus Health is an Australian company, headquartered in Sydney, that provides assisted reproductive technology, specialist pathology and day hospital services. Today, Virtus is one of the top five providers of assisted reproductive services in the world with a presence in Australia, Singapore, Ireland, the UK and Denmark.

The company operates seven specialist day hospitals across Queensland, NSW, Victoria and Tasmania, supporting procedures in fertility, IVF and gynaecology, plastic and cosmetic procedures, dentistry, ophthalmology, urology, orthopaedics and general surgery.

Virtus Diagnostics was established as a separate division in 2015 and offers general pathology services as well as specialist fertility and genetic testing.

Virtus Health completed a number of acquisition, including Canberra Fertility Centre in 2016, IDS Pathology in 2015, Rotunda IVF in 2015, TasIVF in 2014 IVF Sunshine Coast in 2014, and Sims IVF in 2014.

Virtus Health listed on the Australian Stock Exchange in June 2013. On 4 August 2022 Virtus Health was de-listed from the ASX following its acquisition by private equity firm BGH Capital.

== Scientific achievements ==
- A/Prof John McBain AO, founder of Melbourne IVF, was part of the team responsible for the conception and birth of Australia’s first IVF conceived child, Candice Reed .
- Dr Leeanda Wilton, Melbourne IVF, is an international leader in the field of pre-implantation genetic testing
- A/Prof Kate Stern, Melbourne IVF, lead the team that achieved the world’s first pregnancy from ovarian tissue grafted in the anterior abdominal wall of a woman.
