= OOh!media =

Australian outdoor advertising and media company

oOh!media
- Formerly: Outdoor Network Network Limited
- Type: Public
- Traded as: ASX: OML
- Industry: Advertising
- Founded: 1989
- Founder: Brendon Cook
- Headquarters: Sydney, Australia
- Key people: James Taylor (CEO)
- Products: Outdoor advertising
- Revenue: $691million (2023)
- Net income: $55 million (2023)
- Website: www.oohmedia.com.au

oOh!media Limited is an Australian outdoor advertising and media company operating nationally across Australia and New Zealand, based in Sydney, Australia. The company was founded by Brendon Cook as Outdoor Network Australia in 1989, and is Australia's largest operator of out of home advertising products.

== History ==
The company was founded in 1989 as an advertising site representation business called Outdoor Network Australia by Brendon Cook.

The company listed on the Australian Securities Exchange (ASX) in 2002 as Network Limited (ASX:NWK), rebranding as oOh!media in 2008, following the acquisition of Melbourne based firm Media Puzzle. Also in 2008, it acquired regional advertising company Sports & Outdoor Media in a $40 million deal.

In 2012, oOh!media was privatised by Champ Private Equity and WWP. Shortly after being privatised, the company acquired EYE Corp from Ten Network Holdings for $145 million (which was later reduced to $113 million).

In December 2014, the oOh!media was floated once again on the ASX, raising $169 million for its shareholders, which prior to listing were Champ (75.5%), WPP (20.3%) and the remainder by management and other stakeholders.

In 2016, oOh!media purchased 85% of Junkee Media for $11 million. It acquired the remaining 15% several years later.

In 2017, oOh!media planned to merge with rival APN Outdoor, however was aborted after the Australian Competition & Consumer Commission raised preliminary concerns.

In June 2018, oOh!media purchased street furniture business Adshel for $570 million from Here, There & Everywhere, in a competitive bidding war against rival APN Outdoor.

In January 2020, founder Brendon Cook announced he would step down as managing director and CEO. Cathy O'Connor was announced as the new CEO in August 2020.

In December 2021, oOh!media sold Junkee Media to RACAT Group. oOh!media retained Junkee's branded content and production arm, Junkee Studio. Junkee Media CEO Neil Ackland remained at oOh!media.

In December 2024, following multiple years of revenue loss, O'Connor announced a restructure with the aim of saving up to $15 million in costs. Despite this attempt to preserve her role and maintain good standing with shareholders, in April 2025 O'Connor announced that she would resign in the latter half of the year.

In April 2026, Pacific Equity Partners launched a takeover offer valued at A$750 million.
