= Inside Retail =

Inside Retail is an International trade magazine and websites for the retailing industry, published by Octomedia.

It started as Inside Retail Weekly, launched as a printed weekly newspaper back in the early 1970s in Australia followed by a bi-monthly magazine and a free internet website in June 2006.

In 2014 Inside Retail launched Inside Retail NZ following the Australian success covering New Zealand Retail News and later in 2015 also launched in Asia in general as well as Hong Kong and Singapore.

Throughout the day they publish retail news, intelligence and analysis, facilitating and informing the retail industry in various locations around the world.
