= "What I eat in a day" video =

Social media trend

A still from a "what I eat in a day" video

"What I eat in a day" videos are a trend on several social media platforms where a person describes all the meals and snacks that they eat during a given day, often as part of a given diet. The videos, shared on platforms including Twitter, TikTok and YouTube, become increasingly popular in 2020, with some of them accumulating millions of views, and they are considered a profitable industry for the people making them. Some have raised concerns that the videos may promote an unrealistic standard for healthy eating and contribute to the development of eating disorders.

== Format ==
These videos often feature a montage of the food that the creator eats over the course of the day, sometimes with the associated calorie count of the foods that they describe. Unlike related mukbang videos, however, in which participants eat large amounts of food, the diets described are often restrictive. However, other videos are labeled as "unhealthy" and depict large portion sizes and higher amounts of processed food.

== Popularity ==
"What I eat in a day" videos have been used by fitness and food influencers since the 2010s, but became more widespread around 2021, particularly on Instagram. This phenomenon is self-reinforcing because when social media users watch or like these videos they are likely to see more of them in the future. Some of the most successful videos have millions of views each.

== Criticism and controversy ==
Several dieticians and mental health professionals over the impacts that these videos can have, as they can advocate a restrictive style of eating and not "promote body diversity." They have also raised concerns that this trend could contribute to a rise in disordered eating, especially since use of social media is known to increase feelings of negative body image. This trend is particularly prevalent among young adults, which are also the group with the highest vulnerability to eating disorders.

More recently, a portion of these videos have begun to challenge diets and depict more realistic ways of eating in order to reduce the potential consequences of the trend.

== See also ==
- Dieting
- Social media and psychology
