= Ironbridge Capital =

- Industry: Private Equity
- Founded: 2003
- Founder: Neil Broekhuizen; Paul Evans; Julian Knights; Greg Ruddock
- Area served: Australia; New Zealand

Ironbridge Capital is an Australian equity firm that invests in Australian and New Zealand businesses. It invests in buyouts and expansions of medium to large sized businesses. Ironbridge was founded in 2003 by Neil Broekhuizen, Paul Evans, Julian Knights and Greg Ruddock, who collectively own the company.

Its largest investment since July 2007 has been media company MediaWorks New Zealand, which owns TV3, C4 and half of New Zealand's radio stations including Radio Live, More FM, The Rock, The Edge and The Breeze. It had a 70% controlling stake in MediaWorks, making it one of the largest owners of the New Zealand media industry, and played an active role in the management of the company. MediaWorks' lenders took control of MediaWorks in 2013 and pushed Ironbridge out.

Its other investments include Affinity Health, Australian Drilling Solutions, EnviroWaste, FleetPartners, iNova Pharmaceuticals (now sold), Qualcare, ReproMed, Recreational Tourism Group, Stardex Insurance Group and Amart Furniture. Ironbridge Capital also owns the Global Renewables Alternative Waste Treatment Plant located at Eastern Creek, NSW.

Ironbridge invest $13M and co-ordinate Australia largest pre-revenue capital raising in Australian SME Challenger bank Judo Capital
