= Michelle Bridges =

Personal trainer, author, television personality

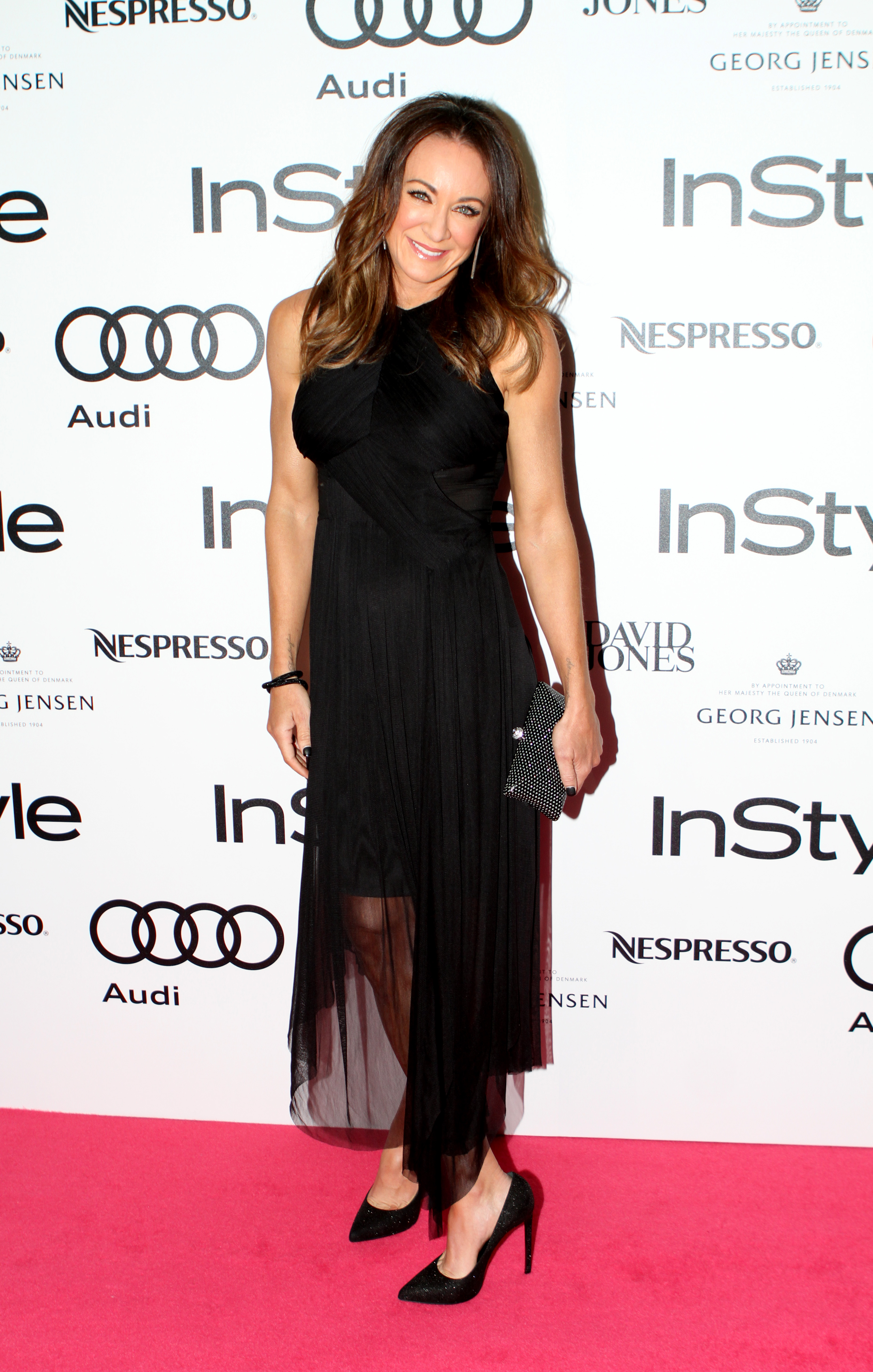
- Bridges in 2015
- Born: 20 October 1970 (age 56); Newcastle, New South Wales, Australia
- Occupations: Personal trainer, author, television personality
- Spouse: Bill Moore (2003–2013)
- Partner: Steve Willis (2012–2020)
- Children: 1
- Website: michellebridges.com.au

Michelle Bridges (born 20 October 1970) is an Australian personal trainer, author and television personality. From 2007 to 2015, she was a trainer on the Australian version of The Biggest Loser, making her first appearance in the second season.

== Early life ==
Bridges attended high school in [Newcastle, Lambton High School]. In an interview with The Sydney Morning Herald, she said "I was 14 when I pitched the idea to my school mistress that I would take the kids at school who didn't play sport, who hung around smoking cigarettes, and do fitness classes with them." She then went on to take over space at a local squash court along with her personal trainer Tash Sheehy and taught classes there. At 18, Bridges graduated from the Australian Institute of Fitness as a certified fitness instructor, and has served since 2009 as an ambassador for the organisation.

Bridges opened up about being sexually assaulted when she was 18 years old. Bridges escaped from her attacker and ran to a police station with cuts and bruises. She reported the assault to police and indicated she most definitely wanted to press charges. Months later, she found herself in the local court room facing down her attacker and enduring a fierce cross-examination from his lawyer, who quizzed her on what sort of clothes she had been wearing and how short her skirt had been. The man who assaulted her was sentenced to a year in prison.

== Career ==
=== Television appearances ===
In 2007, Bridges became a trainer on The Biggest Loser. In her first season, she trained the red team alongside Jillian Michaels. She appeared as the red team trainer for every season. In 2016, Bridges announced she was leaving the series.

Bridges has appeared on the Nine Network's Mornings with Kerri-Anne as a women's health and fitness expert.

Bridges was one of the contestants on the first season of Celebrity MasterChef Australia in 2009. She describes herself as "a bit of a foodie" and won the second heat with her signature dish of Moroccan spiced lamb with eggplant and currant couscous, beating performer Kathleen de Leon Jones and journalist Peter FitzSimons to continue in the competition.

In 2019, Bridges competed in the sixteenth season of Dancing with the Stars, where she got paired with Aric Yegudkin. She was fifth to be eliminated from the competition.

Bridges regularly appears as a guest on shows such as Can of Worms, The Project and Sunrise.

In September 2020, Bridges was announced as a celebrity contestant on the revived new season of The Celebrity Apprentice Australia in 2021.

In March 2024, she was announced as a celebrity contestant on the tenth season of I'm a Celebrity...Get Me Out of Here!.

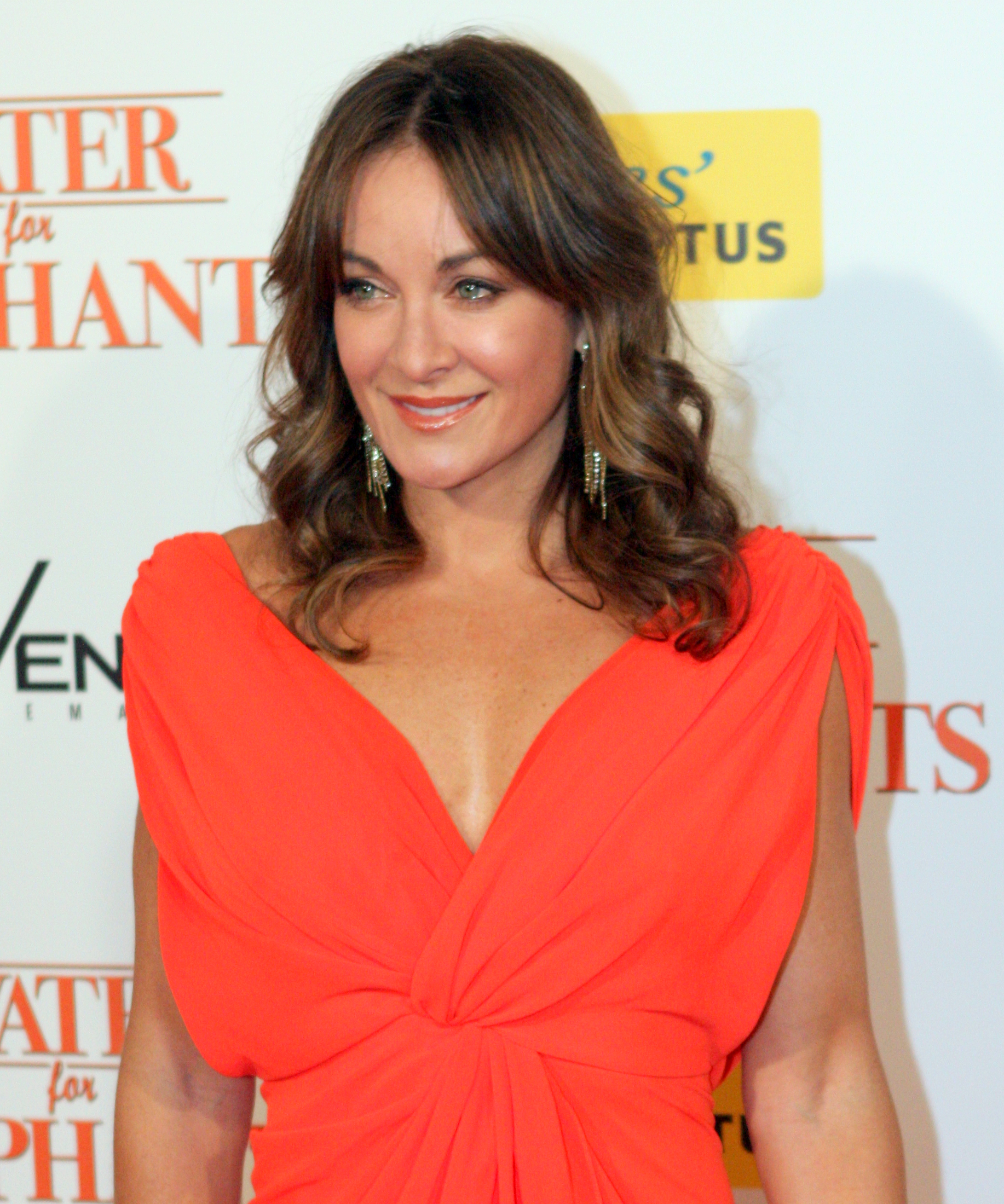
Bridges at the Sydney premiere of the film Water for Elephants in May 2011

=== Books ===
In addition to her TV appearances, Bridges is the author of several books, including:

- The Perimenopause Method
- Crunch Time: Lose Weight Fast and Keep it Off
- Food for Life
- Super Foods Cookbook
- Keeping It Off
- Low Carb Solution
- Losing the Last 5 Kilos: Your Kick-Arse Guide to Looking and Feeling Fantastic
- Crunch Time Cookbook: 100 Knockout Recipes for Rapid Weight Loss
- The No Excuses Cookbook
- Make it Happen
- Losing The Last 5 Kilos
- 5 Minutes A Day
- Everyday Weight Loss
- Your Best Body
- Get Real!

=== BIG W ===
In 2012, Bridges launched the fitness and leisure range ONEActive, sold in Big W stores across Australia. This includes hardware fitness goods, footwear and apparel. Her fitness wear ranges in sizes from 8–26. In August 2013 her apparel was launched on the BIG W website and in September 2013 she established a licence agreement to also sell kitchenware with the retail chain. Also in September 2013, Bridges expanded her apparel to include children's fitness clothes for ages 8 to 16.

=== Games ===
In 2010, Ubisoft brought Bridges to Canada to help develop the weight loss segments of their product Your Shape: Fitness Evolved. The company used motion capture to create an avatar of Bridges to appear in the game, which will use the Kinect technology. Bridges said "It was quite extraordinary. I'm now a fitness trainer inside an XBox game." Bridges said fitness games could provide as good a workout as going to the gym, saying "If you can roll out of bed and turn on your Xbox and get into it games like this one, you've just cut your travel time to get the gym, to find a park and you're good to go. There's a real opportunity to spark a passion to get into your fitness."

=== 12 Week Body Transformation ===
Michelle Bridges started the online 12 Week Body Transformation in 2010. As of January 2019, the program claims that users have lost a combined weight of over 1,500,000 kilograms.

== Personal life ==
Bridges married fitness trainer and gym owner Bill Moore, who later became her business manager, in 2003. The couple separated in May 2013 and Bridges began dating fellow Biggest Loser trainer Steve Willis. She currently resides in Sydney. In July 2015, the couple announced they were expecting their first child together. On 19 December 2015, Bridges gave birth to their son. She later confirmed that she and Steve Willis had ended their relationship.

=== Legal issues ===
On 26 January 2020, Bridges pleaded guilty to mid-range drink-driving after being caught behind the wheel of her 4WD with her five-year-old son in the car. She allegedly returned a blood alcohol reading of 0.086. She was fined $750 and banned from driving for three months.
