= Australian Institute of Personal Trainers =

- Industry: Education (Health & Fitness)
- Founded: 1999
- Founder: Paul Timms
- Headquarters: Brisbane, Australia
- Number of locations: 100+
- Area served: Australia
- Key people: Kevin Kalinko, AIPT Director;
- Website: aipt.edu.au

The Australian Institute of Personal Trainers (AIPT – RTO 32363) is a privately owned registered training organisation (RTO) that offers health, wellness, and fitness qualifications both online and face to face.

== History ==
The Australian Institute of Personal Trainers was established in 2000 by Paul Timms. Registration requirements varied between states at the time, with just New South Wales providing recognition for personal trainers. The idea for AIPT came to Timms initially while living in Cairns, Queensland.

For the first five years, the AIPT offered a membership program to support independent personal trainers and gym owners. In 2006, it became an RTO and expanded throughout regional areas. The AIPT began to further expand via partnerships with major gym chains in 2011.

== VET FEE-HELP controversy ==
In 2015, the Australian Institute of Personal Trainers was the subject of a submission to the Senate Education and Employment References Committee inquiry into the operation, regulation and funding of private vocational education and training providers in Australia. AIPT later lodged a response to the Committee concerning the submission by Andrew Jeremijenko, in which it defended its enrolment procedures and stated that it had complied with applicable laws and guidelines.

Between 2014 and 2016, AIPT received approximately $109.73 million in VET FEE-HELP loans for 11,289 students, growing from $20.5 million in 2014 to a peak of $54.9 million in 2015.

On 21 March 2017, AIPT received five infringement notices for alleged contraventions of clause 39DH of Schedule 1A to the Higher Education Support Act 2003, relating to accepting requests for Commonwealth assistance when students were allegedly not entitled. AIPT voluntarily revoked its VET provider approval, effective 17 January 2018.

Following legislative changes that commenced on 1 January 2019 allowing the removal of VET FEE-HELP debts incurred due to inappropriate conduct by vocational education providers or their agents, AIPT was listed among providers subject to a Notice of Debt Removal. The notice, most recently updated on 20 December 2024, confirmed that VET FEE-HELP debts were removed or in the process of being removed for students who were enrolled with AIPT between 1 January 2014 and 31 December 2016, did not complete relevant units of study, and had a VET FEE-HELP debt for those incomplete units. The VET FEE-HELP Student Redress Measures operated from 1 January 2019 until 31 December 2023.

AIPT remained a significant source of complaints to the VET Student Loans Ombudsman through 2020-2021. Open complaints increased from 64 as of September 2020 to 95 by December 2020. During the April-June 2021 quarter, AIPT received 30 new complaints and finalised 47, with 82 complaints remaining open as of 30 June 2021, representing approximately 6% of all open VET FEE-HELP complaints nationally at that time.

== See also ==
- Australian Fitness & Health Expo
