= John Reed Fitness =

International fitness center chain

John Reed Fitness LLC
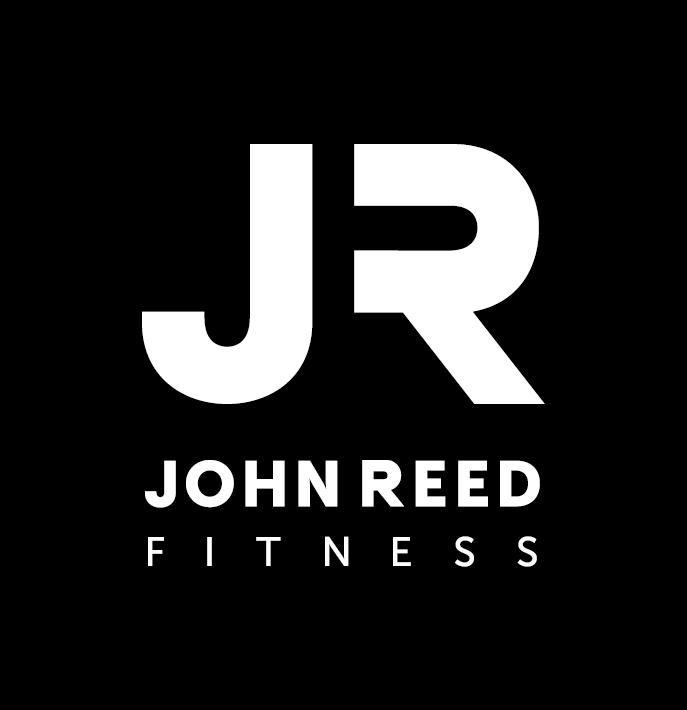
- Type: Health club
- Genre: Fitness
- Founded: 2016
- Founder: Rainer Schaller
- Headquarters: Schlüsselfeld and Berlin, Germany
- Number of locations: 24 (20123) in 12 countries
- Area served: Europe (11 countries) and the United States
- Key people: Dr. Jobst Müller-Trimbusch (Co-CEO), Hagen Wingertszahn (Co-CEO), Danny Waggoner (Co-CEO Group USA Inc.), Brian Warne (Co-CEO RSG Group USA Inc.)
- Revenue: €347.2 million (2019) of RSG Group
- Parent: RSG Group
- Website: johnreed.fitness

John Reed Fitness Music Club is an international health club chain with studios in Europe and the US. It is a brand of the RSG Group, whose headquarters are located in Schlüsselfeld and Berlin, Germany. With more than 4.5 million members, the RSG Group is one of the leading fitness companies worldwide. It also owns the fitness brands McFit and Gold's Gym.

== History ==
The first John Reed Fitness Club opened in Bonn, Germany in 2016. Rainer Schaller, who also founded the health club chain McFit, wanted to bring a studio concept onto the market with John Reed that placed a strong focus on the interior design and the musical accompaniment during training. This approach should be significantly different from his own chain McFit and classic fitness studio chains in order to appeal to broader target groups. The second John Reed Fitness Music Club opened in July of the same year in Salzburg, Austria. In 2017, a John Reed Club opened exclusively for women in the Prenzlauer Berg district of Berlin. From then on, rapid expansion followed across Europe: in 2017, clubs opened in the Czech Republic and Hungary, in 2019 the entry into Switzerland followed. In 2020, John Reed opened in Turkey, in 2021 in the Netherlands and the United Kingdom.

In 2022, John Reed Fitness Music Club partnered with soccer world champion Sergio Ramos and opened a studio in the Spanish capital Madrid under the name SERGIO RAMOS by John Reed. After the death of Schaller, the collaboration with Ramos was dissolved in 2023. The studio continues to exist under the name McFit Gold. Global expansion into the US market followed with studios opening in 2022 in Dallas and 2023 in Los Angeles.

== Concept ==
=== Design ===
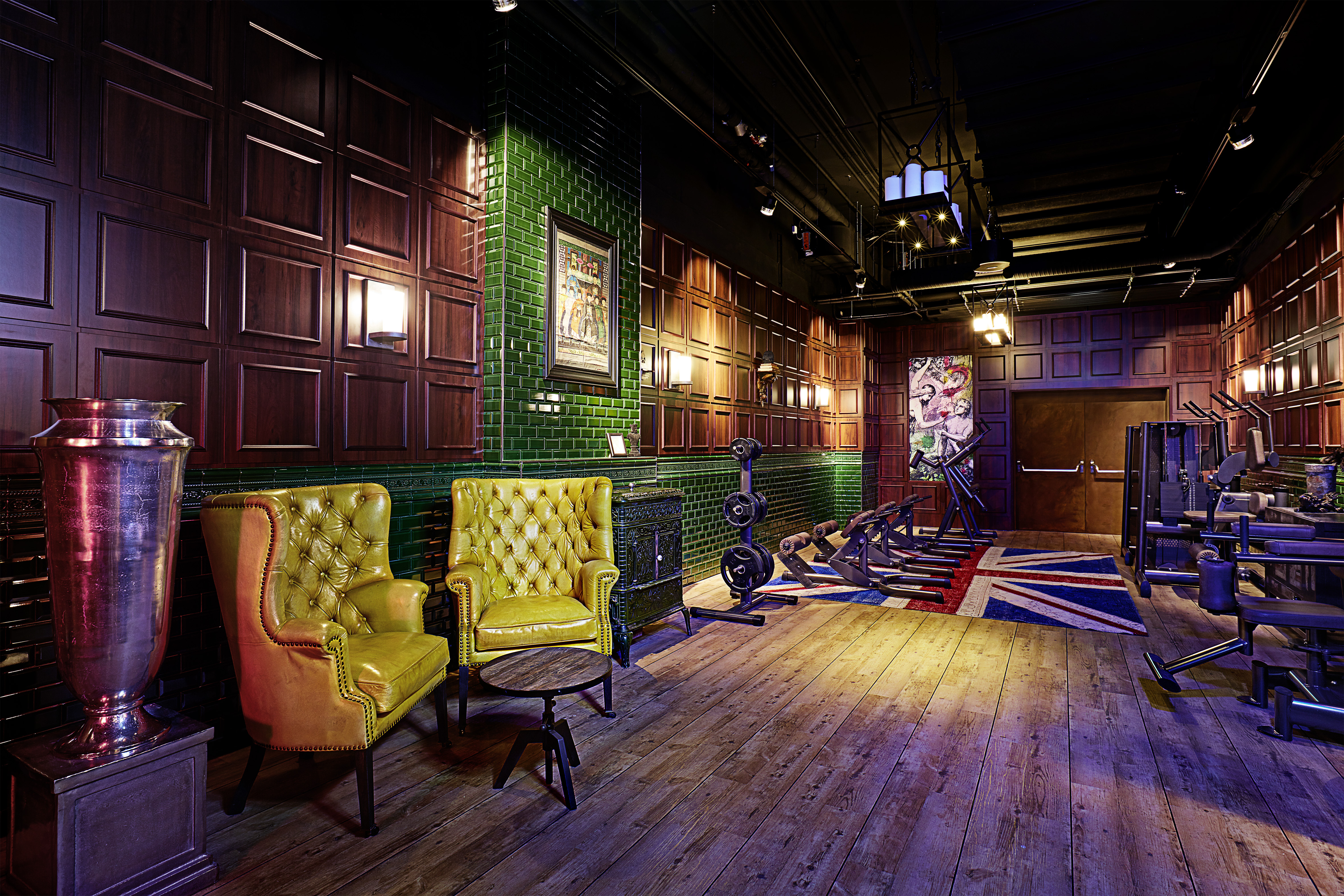
John Reed Studio in Berlin

The facilities at John Reed Fitness Music Club are visually very different from traditional gyms. Each location has its own unique design and art concept. The studios feature large-scale paintings on the walls, such as graffiti, calligraffitis, or stencil painting. Some clubs also have small art galleries integrated into them. The exhibition of works of art primarily supports local and national artists. For example, works by Ron Miller or El Bocho can be found in many of the studios. The artworks are combined with special decorative elements, sculptures and different furnishing styles.

=== Fitness and music ===
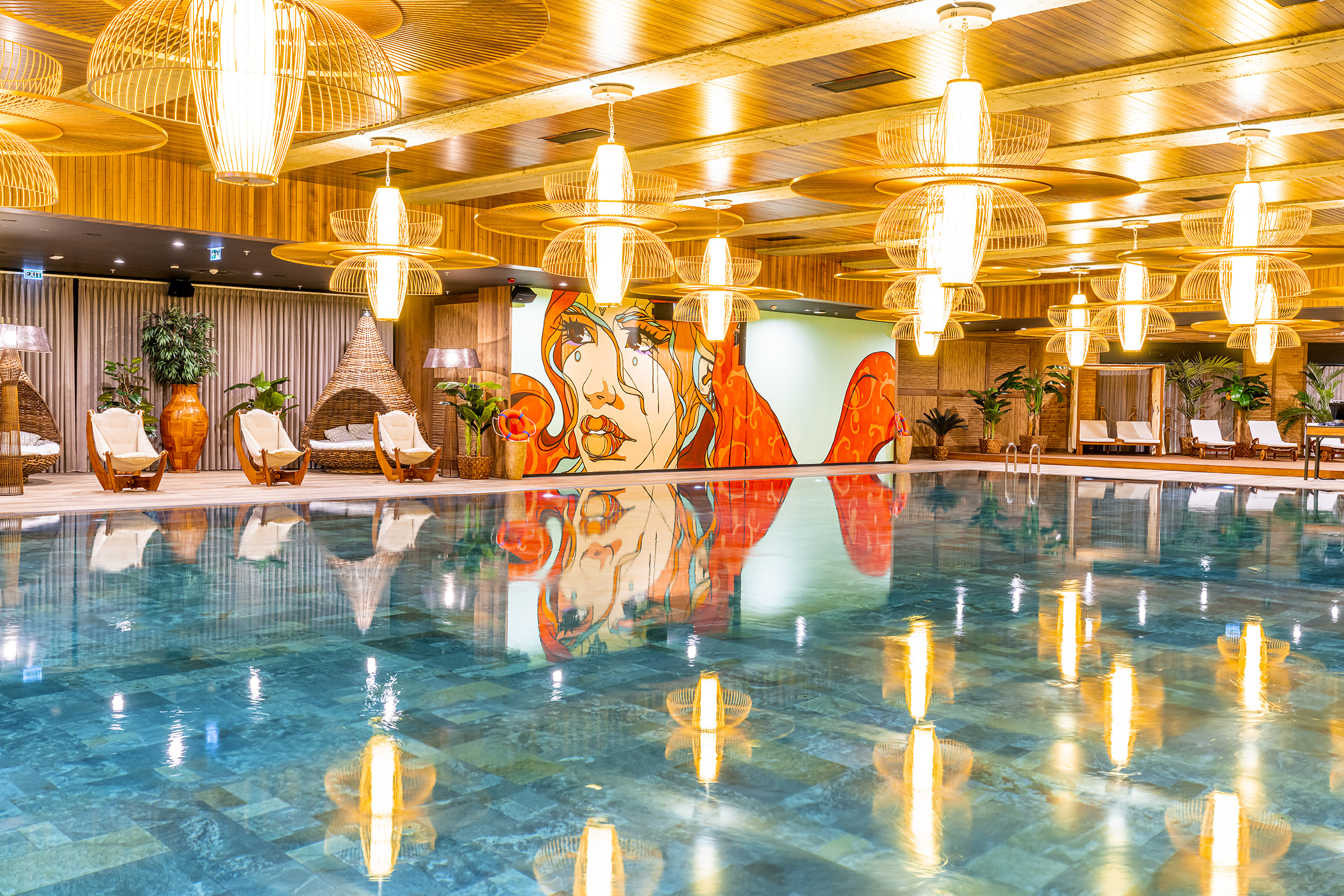
Pool area of John Reed Studio in Istanbul

The studios have various training areas with free weights, exercise machines, cardio and functional areas. A large selection of fitness courses using the methods Pilates, Yoga or strengthening and endurance are also offered. Each studio is equipped with its own DJ booth, where international DJs play live music twice a week. Meanwhile, a training program is offered in the form of group courses. In addition, John Reed has his own radio station with four different stations, which can be listened to in the studio or on the go via an app. The company puts together the music itself. Depending on the size and situation, around a third of the clubs have wellness areas with a sauna, swimming pool, whirlpool and relaxation room.

=== Special locations ===
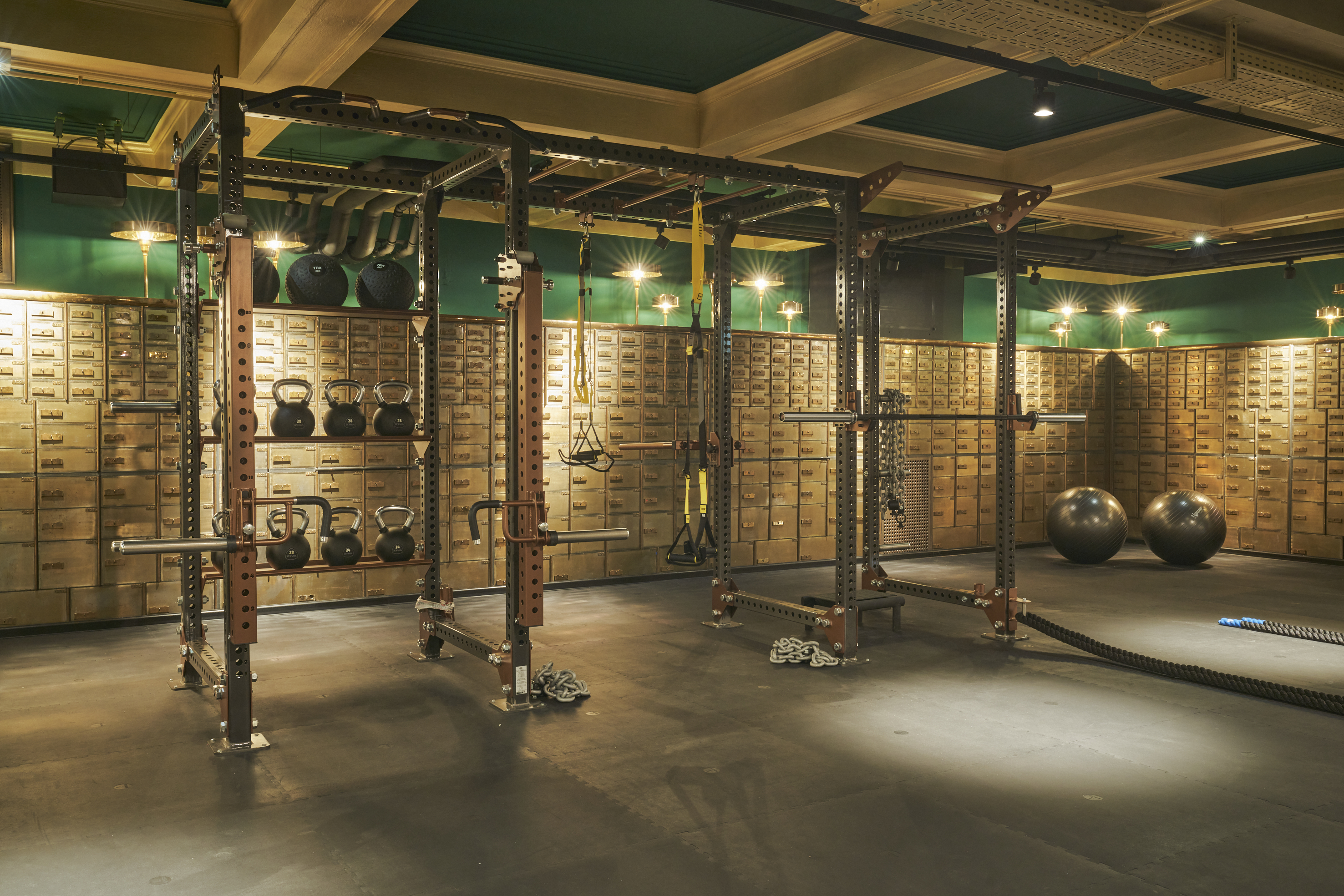
John Reed Studio using parts of the safe-deposit room in Vienna

Some studio locations are housed in historically relevant buildings. In Salzburg, Austria, a former cinema was converted to retain many old features. Cardio training, for example, takes place in front of the big cinema screen. In Vienna-Schottentor, the John Reed Fitness Music Club is located on 5,000 m^{2} in a former bank building that is a listed building. The meter-thick walls and armored doors remained here, as did the vault in which the weight benches were housed. In Hanover, John Reed Fitness Music Club has converted the former main freight station into a fitness studio. Many elements were left in the industrial style or designed in the shabby chic style in order to maintain the atmosphere of the station. The largest German studio opened in Berlin in September 2023 in the vaulted cellars of the former Bötzow brewery. Here too, the architectural conditions were integrated into the design. Under seven-meter-high vaulted ceilings, there are now individual relaxation areas in the old coolships of the beer brewery.

=== Additional concepts ===
Some John Reed Fitness studios offer free childcare from ages six months to six years.
