= RSG Group =

International fitness center chain

- logo used since 2019

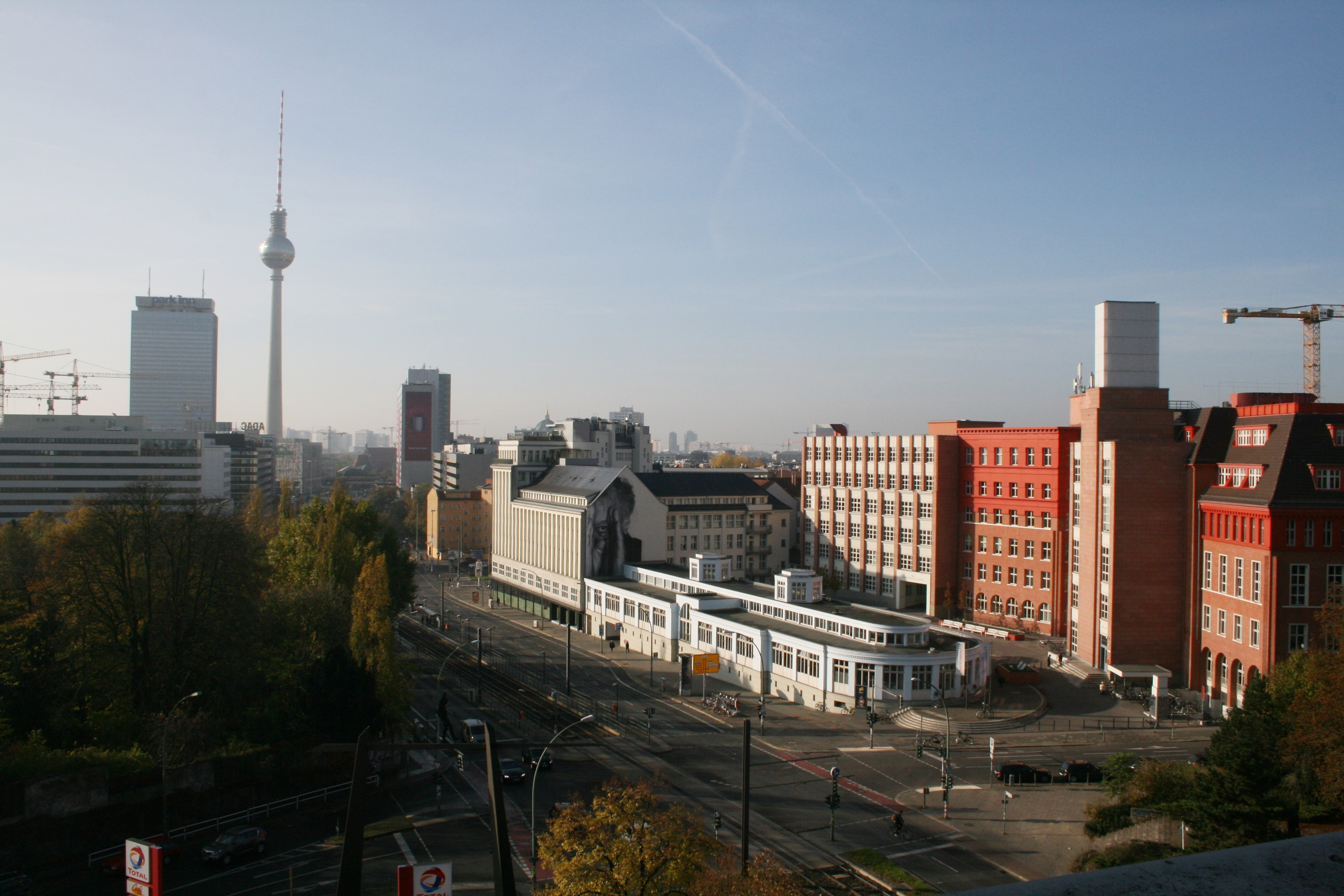
- Headquarters in Berlin, Germany
- Type: LLC
- Industry: Health clubs Fitness; Fitness food
- Predecessor: McFit LLC (1996-2016), McFit Global Group (2016-2019)
- Founded: January 1, 1996; 30 years ago in Würzburg, Germany
- Founders: Rainer Schaller
- Headquarters: Berlin, Germany
- Number of locations: ▲900 health clubs
- Area served: Worldwide (30+ countries)
- Key people: Dr. Jobst Müller-Trimbusch (Co-CEO), Hagen Wingertszahn (Co-CEO), Bradford Reynolds (CEO RSG Group USA Inc.)
- Products: McFit; Gold's Gym; John Reed Fitness; McFit Models; Loox; Cyberobics
- Revenue: ▲US$325 million (2021)
- Members: 4.5 millions
- Number of employees: c. 10,000 (2022)
- Subsidiaries: RSG Group North America LP, RSG Group USA Inc., Gold's Gym Trading LLC, IncCyberobics LLC, The Reed LLC, Loox Sports LLC, and McFit Model Agency LLC
- Website: rsggroup.com

RSG Group LLC (Rainer Schaller Global Group) is a German, internationally active fitness group founded in 1996 by Rainer Schaller. The registered office is in Schlüsselfeld, Germany, and the administrative headquarters are in Berlin, Germany. The group's best-known brands are the Gold's Gym, McFit and John Reed studio chains. In the United States, the company operates under RSG Group North America LP and RSG Group USA Inc.

RSG Group is one of the largest fitness groups worldwide in the turnover and number of gym members. The various companies and brands of the RSG Group offer their customers a wide range of fitness and wellness services, including endurance and strength training, group fitness classes, and personal training. RSG Group also has other businesses: a modelling agency, a restaurant with event spaces, and a digital sports magazine. It also owns shares and partnerships in gym80, Hero Workout, and Ron Miller.

== Corporate structure ==
RSG Group is a limited liability company under German law. After its foundation, Rainer Schaller took over the management alone until his death in October 2022. Since December 2022, Hagen Wingertszahn and Dr Jobst Müller-Trimbusch have been Co-CEOs. Within RSG Group USA Inc. (Gold's Gym) the Co-CEOs are Danny Waggoner and Brian Warne.

== History ==
Rainer Schaller founded McFit Fitness LLC with the concept of low-priced fitness studios open 24 hours a day. After opening the first McFit studio in Würzburg, Germany in 1997, other branches followed throughout Germany. In 2007, McFit bought out its competitor Fit24. The company was then perceived as a major player in the industry. It reached revenue of over 100 million euros the same year. In 2008 Wladimir and Vitali Klitschko appeared as celebrity ambassadors for the McFit brand for several years. One year later, the international expansion began with studios in Austria and Spain. Italy was added in 2014 with a studio in Verona. In the same year, McFit took over the Italian gym chain Happy-Fit, whose 14 branches were renamed McFit.

With John Reed Fitness, a studio concept for the urban environment was developed in 2016. Under his leadership, music became a central element, and value was placed on the interior design and furnishings. The brand also expanded in the US with clubs in Los Angeles and Dallas.

McFit was founded in 1996 (actual logo)

After entering international markets, McFit became the McFit Global Group in 2016. With the expansion of other divisions, the name eventually changed to RSG Group (Rainer Schaller Global Group) in 2019. In addition, a new headquarters for RSG Group North America was built in Los Angeles. According to Statista, the group was the fitness provider with the highest number of members in Germany in 2020.

In the summer of 2020, the group acquired for $100m the American fitness chain Gold's Gym, which had gone bankrupt in the wake of the COVID-19 pandemic. With this, it took over more than 70 of its own and more than 530 franchise studios worldwide. By 2023, the RSG Group says its portfolio will include over 900 gyms in more than 30 countries.

== Brands ==
=== Gold's Gym ===
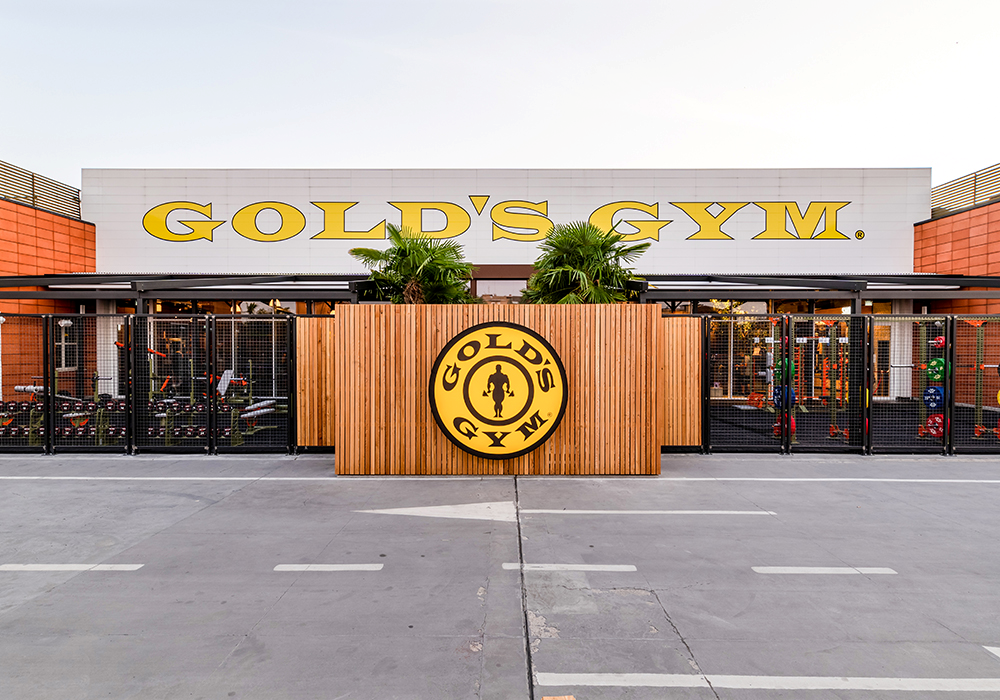
Gold's Gym Studio in Milan opened in 2023.

Since 1965, Gold's Gym has developed into a global brand with over 600 locations, expanding to six continents with three million members. More than 70 gyms are company-owned, and the rest of the gyms are franchised. Famous personalities such as Arnold Schwarzenegger, Lou Ferrigno and Franco Columbu trained at the original Gold's Gym in Venice Beach. Ten months after the Gold's Gym acquisition, new gyms were opened also in Europe. RSG Group opened the brand's flagship gym in Berlin in June 2021, which is also the world's greenest gym as well as the greenest LEED Platinum certified studio.

=== John Reed Fitness ===
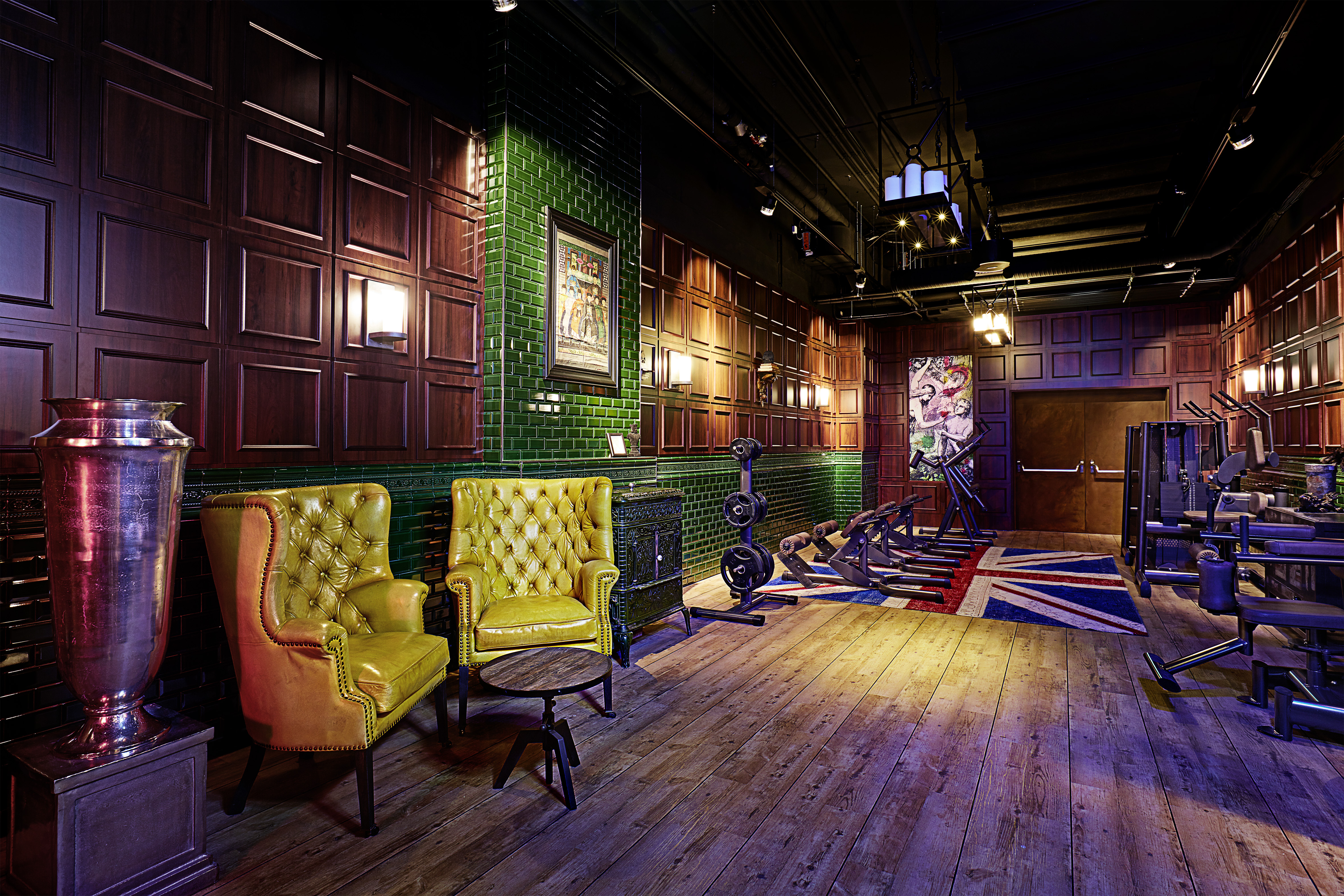
John Reed Studio opened 2016 in Berlin.

The approximately 50 clubs of the John Reed Fitness brand stand out from regular gyms primarily because of the specially curated art and music, as well as live DJs and club atmosphere. John Reed Fitness curates each location specifically. Around a third of the studios have additional wellness facilities such as a sauna, swimming pool and whirlpool. In 2021 a new location was opened in London and in March 2021, the first John Reed brand gym in North America opened in Los Angeles. The brand's flagship studio in Europe was inaugurated in Vienna, Austria in September 2022.

=== Heimat ===
Heimat is a new brand of the RSG Group that focuses on the top premium and lifestyle market as a place where you feel most at home in an exclusive club environment. This includes different wellness options such as, massages, sauna, swimming pool, health courses, restaurant, as well as hydrafacials and pedicures. Heimat combines the idea of discipline and sacrifice of a gym with the idea of living a little, making it more of an exclusive lifestyle club. The word Heimat derives from the German language and can be translated to home or homeland, although there is no exact semantic translation to English possible, that would match the idea and feeling of a location one is deeply connected to, more than your own home. The first Heimat fitness opened on 75,000-square-foot in Hollywood in 2022 and an exclusive female gym in Paris in 2023.

=== McFit ===
McFit is the core brand of the RSG Group in Europe and has over 250 studios in Germany, Italy, Austria and Spain. It is with 1.7 million members the largest fitness chain in Europe. Most studios are open 365 days a year, around the clock. The offer includes equipment for endurance, functional, and strength training as well as fitness courses. To keep the monthly fee low, the studios do not offer wellness facilities such as saunas. McFit expanded in 2009 Europe-wide.

=== McFit Models ===
The group operates a pan-European modelling agency under its eponymous name, focusing on sports models. The talent scouts recruit new models who are actual members of RSG Group gyms. Instead of classic model measurements, the agency emphasizes a healthy appearance. The models are used mainly for sports and lifestyle shoots. In 2017, it started a new body award McFit, in Europe.

=== Loox ===
The magazine focused on sporty exercise and healthy eating was published in print from 2012 to 2014. It has now been published free of charge as an online magazine in Germany since 2018. The target group consists primarily of lifestyle-oriented readers. Regular interviews feature celebrities as well as RSG Group's members, who share their personal training stories.

=== Gold's Gym Nutrition ===
Gold's Gym Nutrition is an international supplier of sports nutrition and dietary supplements tailored to the individual needs of athletes. The goals of this line are promoting muscle building in weight training, supporting weight loss and improving well-being.

=== Cyberobics ===
Cyberobics is a provider of digital video courses and workouts with different levels of difficulty and with the goals of muscle building, weight loss, body toning, endurance training and increasing flexibility. Further training videos are offered on topics such as wellness, Pilates, dancing and courses with exercise bikes, dumbbells, steppers and latex bands. Numerous people around the world train with CYBEROBICS, at home and on the go with the CYBEROBICS app or at a large number of business partners.

=== The Reed ===
The Reed is a mixture of restaurant, café, bar and event space on Berlin's Alexanderplatz, Germany and offers various uses, including a classroom by John & Janes. Music events of various genres with international artists take place there at regular intervals. Inside is a 20-metre-long LED wall, which is used time and again by different artists who present their digital works there.

== Partnerships ==
=== gym80 ===
RSG Group has been equipping its studios with gym80 equipment from day one. In 2020, RSG Group acquired a 35% stake in the leading German fitness equipment manufacturer, making it the sole outside investor. The objective is to increase cooperation in the development of new and improved weight training equipment as well as the expansion of new business areas.

=== Hero Workout ===
RSG Group has held a 50% stake in fitness start-up Hero Workout since 2020. The company has developed a training app with fitness courses and interactive trainers for beginners, advanced and professionals. Using digital motion detection with the help of a special wristband, all exercise executions can be recorded and evaluated in terms of distance, accuracy and intensity, as well as their speed, with athletes receiving voice-activated feedback.

=== Ron Miller ===
The German urban art duo Ron Miller has been part of the RSG Group since 2016. Behind them are two Berliners Ronny Kindt and Marcus Langenick. The key visual of the multidisciplinary artists is the iconic geisha. Their works have already been shown at art exhibitions and fairs worldwide in Miami, New York, Paris, London, Madrid, Milan, Monaco, Zürich, Munich, Leipzig, Frankfurt and Berlin. In many John Reed Studios, their work can be seen alongside that of other artists.

== Social commitment ==
Since 2009, the RSG Group has been supporting the children's and youth organisation Die Arche (“The Ark”) throughout Germany. In addition to monetary and material donations, personal commitment is also an important component of the long-term cooperation. The company regularly organises and accompanies excursions, parties and activities with the children. The company also founded the Torre del Sol - Terapia Para el Alma Foundation, which supports social projects on an alpaca farm on Mallorca, Spain.

== Publication ==
McFit (ed.): #forever strong. Edition Michael Fischer, Igling 2022, ISBN 978-3-7459-1105-3 (recipes and exercises).
