= McFit =

European fitness center chain

McFIT LLC
- Type: Health club
- Genre: Fitness
- Founded: 1996
- Founder: Rainer Schaller
- Headquarters: Schlüsselfeld, Berlin, Germany
- Number of locations: 257 (2019)
- Area served: Europe (5+ countries)
- Revenue: €347.2 million (2019)
- Members: 1.7 millions
- Number of employees: 4000 (2012)
- Parent: RSG Group
- Website: www.mcfit.com

The McFIT LLC is Germany's largest fitness studio chain in terms of membership. Across Europe, it has more than 250 studios in Germany, Austria and Italy. The company previously also operated studios in Poland and Spain. McFit is a brand of the German RSG Group, whose headquarters are in Schlüsselfeld and Berlin, Germany.

== History ==
McFit was founded in 1996 by Rainer Schaller. In the 1990s, he had the idea of opening a discount fitness studio. The goal was to make fitness accessible to everyone at a low monthly fee. The first McFit studio opened in 1997 in the Franconian university town of Würzburg in a converted industrial hall covering an area of around 700 square meters. In the following years, further locations opened in the Ruhr area and Berlin. In 2006, McFit became Germany's largest fitness studio chain in terms of number of members, with almost half a million. In 2007, in addition to the registered headquarters in Schlüsselfeld, another company headquarters was established in the German capital Berlin, where marketing, PR, creative and fitness were concentrated. In the same year McFit took over its most important competitor Fit24 in Germany. In 2008, the 100th studio in Germany opened in Munich, and brothers Wladimir and Vitali Klitschko promoted McFit as celebrity ambassadors over a five-year period. McFit became known to the broad public by sponsoring various TV formats and sporting events that were organized together with moderator Stefan Raab in German TV channel Pro7.

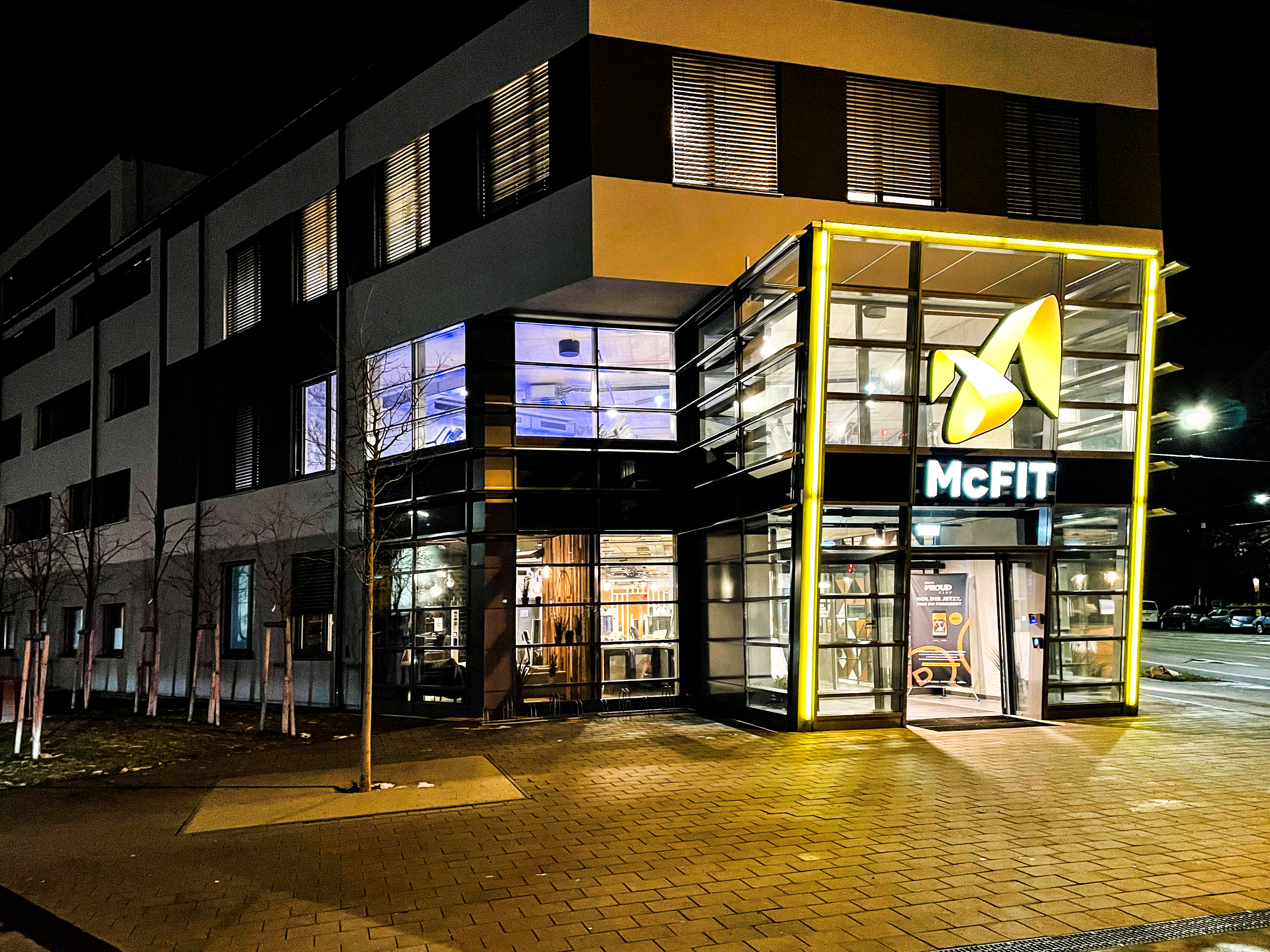
McFit studio opened 2009 in Vienna.

Starting in 2009, the brand also expanded into Austria, Italy and Spain. By 2011, McFit had 1,000,000 members across Europe. In 2014, German designer Michael Michalsky created a design concept for the so-called "Home of Fitness" studios that was intended to be reminiscent of one's own home. The studios exist in Germany and Austria. While the concept was not grown over time, it did lay the foundation for the further development of the chain. Michael Michalsky also served as the art director of McFit Models, a sports model agency that also belongs to the RSG Group and has its own Body Award. McFit Models describes itself as the largest sports model agency in Europe and recruits its models from its own studio members. These models are then cast mainly for sports photo campaigns and video shoots.

With diversification of the business model and a larger international focus, McFit GmbH was renamed McFit Global Group in 2016 and thus simultaneously transformed into an umbrella for all the constituent brands. Additional brands such as High5 (2015) and John Reed Fitness (2016) were added, which were lived within the parent company. As it progressed, McFit Global Group evolved into RSG Group in 2019. Today, McFit has 18 sister brands in RSG Group as a result.

In 2022, the RSG Group exited the Polish market and sold its Polish McFit subsidiary and its studios to the Medicover Group. Following the acquisition, McFit Poland continued to operate under Medicover, but was increasingly separated from the international McFit brand. Locker systems were changed so that existing McFit key cards no longer functioned, requiring members to use padlocks. International McFit membership cards also stopped working at turnstiles, as the systems were no longer connected. Members from other countries were required to request entry from staff, as cross border access was no longer officially supported. In 2025, Medicover restructured McFit Poland and rebranded all but two locations into two new gym chains, JustGym and WellFitness. This process included the remodeling of the converted locations. Most of the gym80 equipment originally used by McFit was retained. As of 2026 there are only two McFit locations left in Poland: one in Lodz and one in Katowice.´

The RSG Group exited the Spanish market in 2024 and sold all of its McFit studios to the Dutch company Basic Fit N.V., which operates a competing low cost international chain of fitness studios.

== History of the logo ==
The first studio opened in 1997 with a banana as the mascot in the logo and the words "The gym for everyone". Over the years, only the banderole with the brand name remained. The color scheme was always the yellow McFIT lettering on a bright blue background. Later the advertising message "Simply look good" followed as an addition on the logo. In 2013, there was a revision of the entire design, which is still current today: they revived the original banana, but developed it further and replaced it with a curved, yellow bow on an anthracite background. Underneath the bow is the white McFIT lettering. The adapted color scheme makes the logo look more discreet overall. The advertising message "Simply look good" (German: "Einfach gut aussehen") remained under the brand name.

== Concept ==
The McFit studios are equipped with a variety of machines for endurance and strength training that are available in multiples so that many people can train at the same time. These include, for example, the leg and chest press, but also treadmills, cross trainers, steppers and rowing machines. While the classic fitness studios in the 1990s and prior were used more by bodybuilders and athletes, which often gave the studios a unapproachable reputation , Rainer Schaller, in developing his concept, attached importance to making fitness possible for the broad masses and enhancing the reputation of fitness. Schaller's basic idea was to keep the offering to consumers as transparent and simple as possible and to focus exclusively on the training equipment. Contrary to the wellness trend that emerged in the fitness sector in the 1990s, additional services such as classrooms, swimming pools or saunas were deliberately omitted in all studios. Even the use of showers initially had to be paid for separately.

Another novelty in Germany at that time was the idea of 24-hour opening hours 365 days a year, which offered members the greatest flexibility in terms of time to go to the gym. Over the years, the McFit concept has changed and evolved somewhat. In the meantime, the studios also have training areas specifically for women, course rooms and areas for functional fitness. The monthly membership fee includes access to all areas, the shower fee and the possibility of fitness courses. Members are allowed to bring their own beverages. With most contracts, training is allowed in all McFit studios throughout Europe. The majority of clubs in Germany and Austria remain open 24 hours a day, 365 days a year.

As of 2026 there are 230 in the following countries:

Country	Number of stores
Germany	176
Italy	46
Austria	16

And the list of former countries includes:

Country	Number of stores
Spain	37 (former locations)
Poland	13 (former locations)

== COVID-19 pandemic ==
During the COVID-19 pandemic, McFit developed creative measures to defy the officially imposed studio closures. Together with the infectiologist Prof. Dr. Klaus-Dieter Zastrow, a special hygiene concept was developed that allowed fitness training to take place outdoors. McFit was the first fitness studio chain in Germany to open outdoor training areas in car parks or under tents to offer its own members the sport despite the Corona restrictions. Each training session was limited to a maximum of 45 minutes per person and only possible after prior registration. Locations in Germany were Hamburg, Bremen, Rostock, Braunschweig, Mannheim, Wiesbaden, Mainz, Magdeburg, Neunkirchen and Berlin. McFit also had such outdoor training areas in Italy.
