= Rainer Schaller =

German entrepreneur (1969–2022)

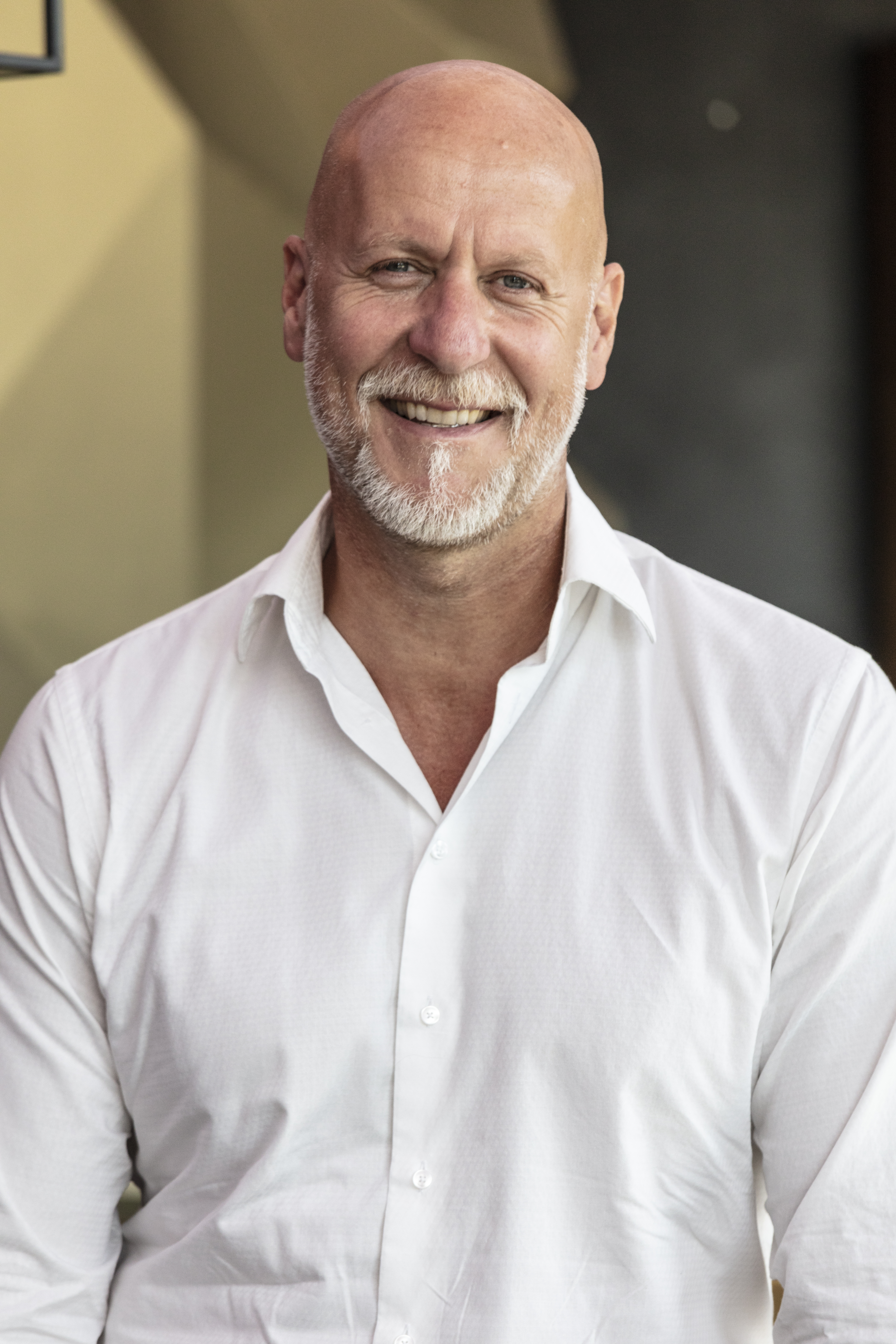
- Schaller in 2018
- Born: 4 January 1969; Bamberg, Bavaria, West Germany
- Died: 21 October 2022 (aged 53); Caribbean Sea near Limón, Costa Rica
- Occupation: Founder CEO of RSG Group GmbH
- Partner: Christine Schikorsky
- Children: 2
- Relatives: Gerd Schaller (brother)

Rainer Schaller (4 January 1969 – 21 October 2022) was a German entrepreneur. He was the founder CEO of RSG Group, which includes the McFit, John Reed Fitness and Gold's Gym fitness studios. He hit headlines as a result of the disaster at the 2010 Love Parade in Duisburg, which he organized. On 21 October 2022, Schaller and his son Aaron died in a private plane crash in Costa Rica.

== Early life ==
Schaller grew up in Schlüsselfeld, West Germany near Bamberg. His mother and grandfather worked in retail there. The conductor and Anton Bruckner expert, Gerd Schaller, is his brother.

== Business career ==
=== Retail ===
Schaller completed his training as a retail salesman in Schlüsselfeld. He supplemented this with further training to become a business and retail specialist. At the age of 22, he took over his first Edeka supermarket, and shortly afterwards three more in his home region.

=== Fitness industry ===
In 1997, he switched to the fitness industry and opened his first studio under the McFit brand in Würzburg, Germany. He tapped into the discount segment of the market with this brand. By mid-2006, McFit was operating 62 fitness studios in Germany with a combined 400,000 members and 1,000 permanent employees. In 2011, McFit was considered the largest fitness studio operator in Europe, with more than 1 million members. Schaller gradually diversified his business to reach different target groups. In 2018, Schaller appointed Vito Scavo to oversee operational management of his holding company. In August 2019, the McFit Global Group holding company was renamed RSG Group and encompasses twelve fitness chains (including McFit, John Reed Fitness, High 5). In 2020, Schaller acquired Gold's Gym, which was in bankruptcy (Chapter 11 proceedings) due to the COVID-19 pandemic. By the end of 2020, Schaller's group of companies employed 41,000 people in 48 countries, managed 17 different brands and more than 1,000 studios.

=== Love Parade ===
In 2006, Schaller became managing director of Lopavent, which organized the Love Parade until 2010. The aim was to use the event to promote McFit's studios. The Love Parade went off without incident, under Schaller's direction, for three years. In 2010, however, he came under fire for the Love Parade disaster in Duisburg, which left 21 people dead and 652 injured. Schaller testified as a witness in the court proceedings on the accident in 2018, accepted moral responsibility, but was not charged.

=== Disappearance and death ===
On 21 October 2022, a Piaggio P.180 Avanti plane carrying Schaller, his partner Christine Schikorsky, their two children, a 66-year-old Swiss pilot and another German passenger crashed into the Caribbean Sea on approach to Limón, Costa Rica, at the end of a flight from Palenque, Mexico. The bodies of Schaller and his son were recovered from the sea two days after the accident.
