= Love Parade disaster =

2010 crowd disaster event

Coordinates: 51°25′13.5″N 6°46′20.5″E

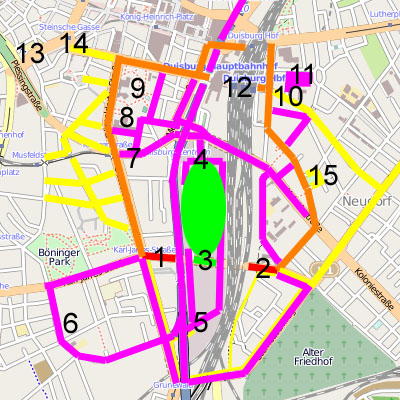
- Map of the Love Parade in Duisburg
- Date: 24 July 2010
- Location: Duisburg, Germany
- Deaths: 21
- Injuries: 652

On 24 July 2010, a crowd disaster at the 2010 Love Parade electronic dance music festival in Duisburg, North Rhine-Westphalia, Germany, caused the deaths of 21 people from suffocation as attendees sought to escape a ramp leading to the festival area. The disaster injured 652 people.

The Love Parade was a free-access music festival and parade that originated in 1989 in Berlin. The parade featured stages, but also had floats with music, DJs, and dancers moving through the audience. The Love Parade in Duisburg was the first time that the festival had been held in a closed-off area. Between 200,000 and 1.4 million people were reported to be attending the event and 3,200 police were on hand.

As a consequence of the disaster, the organizer of the festival announced that no further Love Parades would be held and that the festival was permanently cancelled. Criminal charges were brought against ten employees of the city of Duisburg and of the company that organized the event, but eventually rejected by the court due to the prosecutors' failure to establish evidence for the alleged acts of negligence and their causal connection to the deaths. In 2017, the prosecution of 10 event planners on charges of negligent homicide and mayhem were reinstated, but the trial was ended without a verdict in 2020.

== Background ==
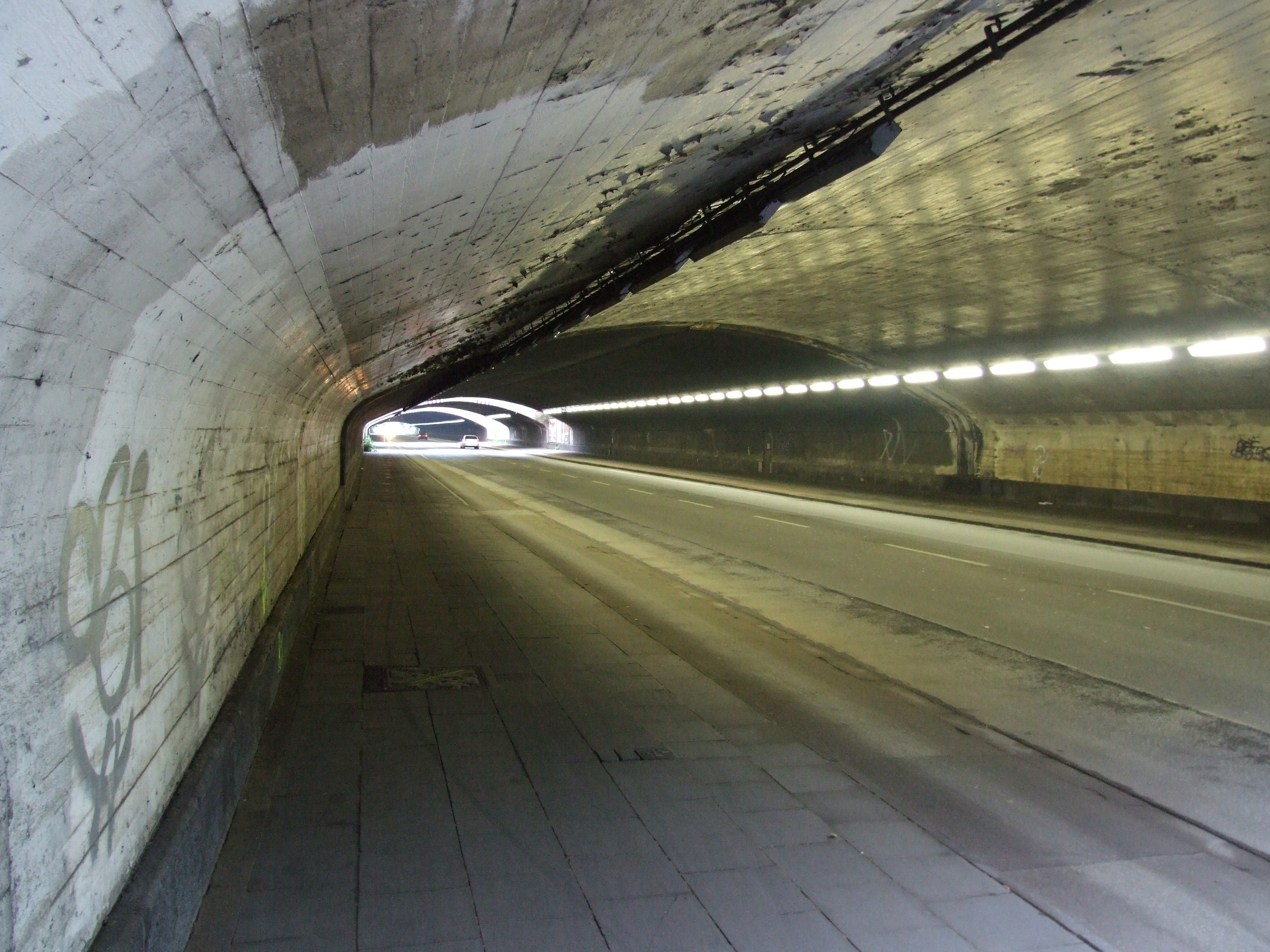
A 2008 photograph of the tunnel that leads to the site of the disaster

With the slogan "The Art of Love", the event was a prominent part of RUHR.2010, a campaign to celebrate Germany's Ruhr valley as one of 2010's European Capitals of Culture. The festival, which had previously been a parade through Berlin, was staged on the grounds of a former freight station in 2010. The confined area had a maximum capacity of 250,000 people; the average turnout of the previous years would have suggested a number of close to one million attendees for the event.

Bruce Cullen of Parker, Colorado, and founder of Trance Elements, a LoveParade artist/performer on float number 7, "The Ship of Fools", mentioned that he and other performers were concerned before the event that there would be problems, stating "we all said it seems like this is not going to work". Although Cullen did not witness the actual event, he stated: "These guys didn't have this planned out right", "They didn't have enough police at the entrances in that tunnel. I am just really upset because people died. Everybody was there to have fun".

== Incident ==
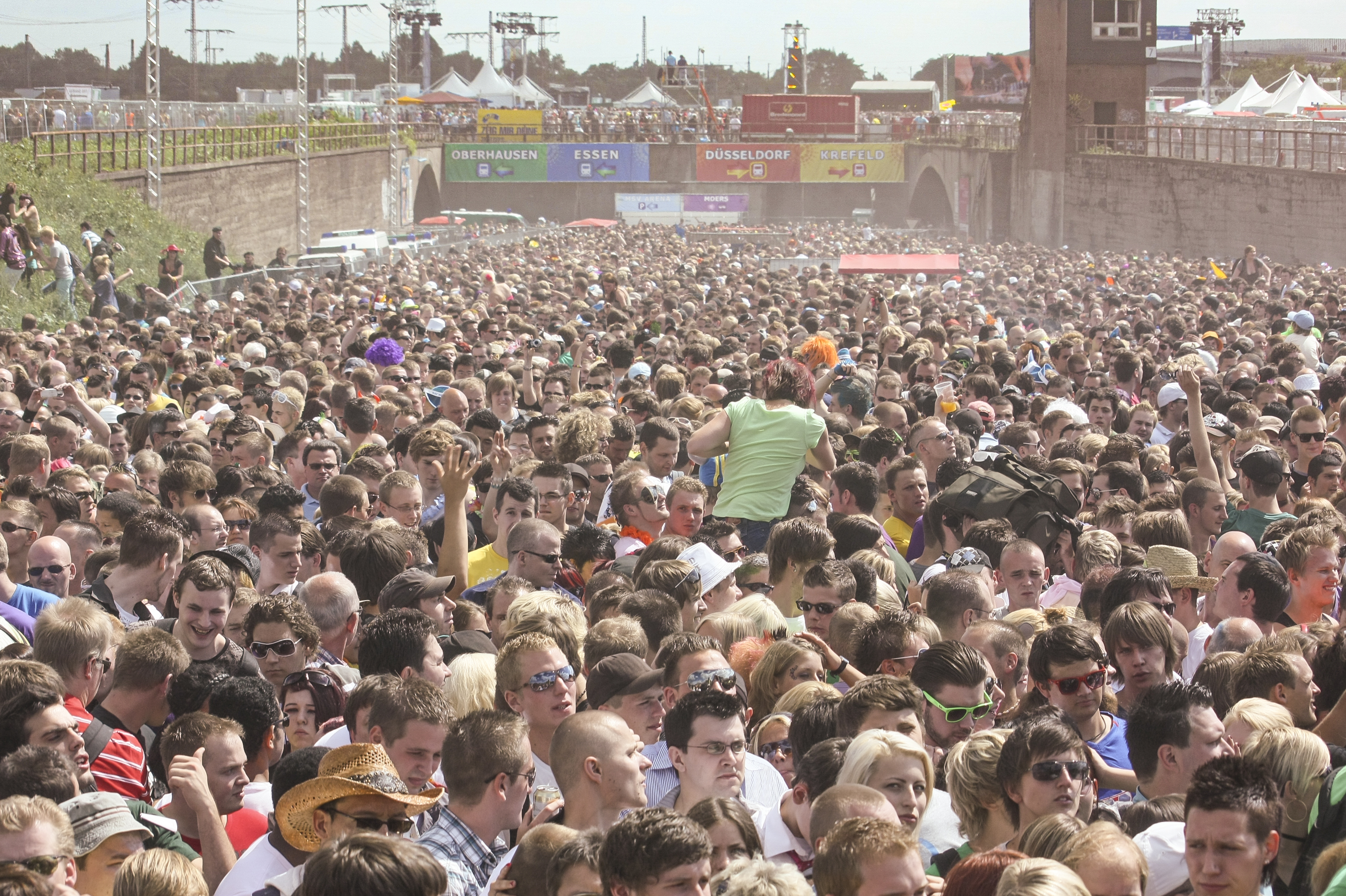
The inclined ramp an hour and a half before the disaster occurred

Admittance to the festival grounds was supposed to begin at 11:00 but was deferred until as late as 12:00 CEST. At the convergence of a 240-meter (260 yard) long tunnel extending from the east and a series of underpasses from the west, was a ramp that served as the only entrance and exit point of the festival area; that is, excepting one smaller ramp between the westerly underpasses. In an effort to relieve overcrowding, police at the entrance began instructing new arrivals by loudspeaker to turn back. Despite being told that the tunnel's only exit was barred off, one which would have otherwise led to the parade area encircling the festival, people continued pushing on into the confined space of the tunnel from the rear. The fatalities occurred when the ramp between tunnel underpasses and the festival area overcrowded until there was a crush. One police officer reported that;

The atmosphere was explosive. Many in the crowd seemed to be intoxicated. When people started falling off the stairs and pulling others with them, it became just chaotic. They just couldn't be stopped. It was a living hell.

— Eyewitness police officer

I will never forget the sight. There were all these twisted-up bodies of those who had been crushed. They were lying at the tunnel exit. Their faces had all turned blue.

— Eyewitness woman trapped in tunnel

There was some debate as to how the deaths occurred. Some reports suggested they were caused by people falling off a staircase as they tried to escape the tunnel. However, autopsies showed that all of the fatalities were due to crushed rib cages.

A 2012 scientific analysis of the causes of the disaster dismissed the earlier descriptions of the incident as a "human stampede" or crowd panic, and instead found evidence of a phenomenon called "crowd turbulence". The study stated that most people died between the staircase and the billboard on the ramp.

Lopavent GmbH, the organiser of the Love Parade, released a film, depicting an explanation of the events. The film is based on CCTV recordings, explanatory animations, documents, press reports and eyewitness accounts released by the organiser.

== Fatalities ==
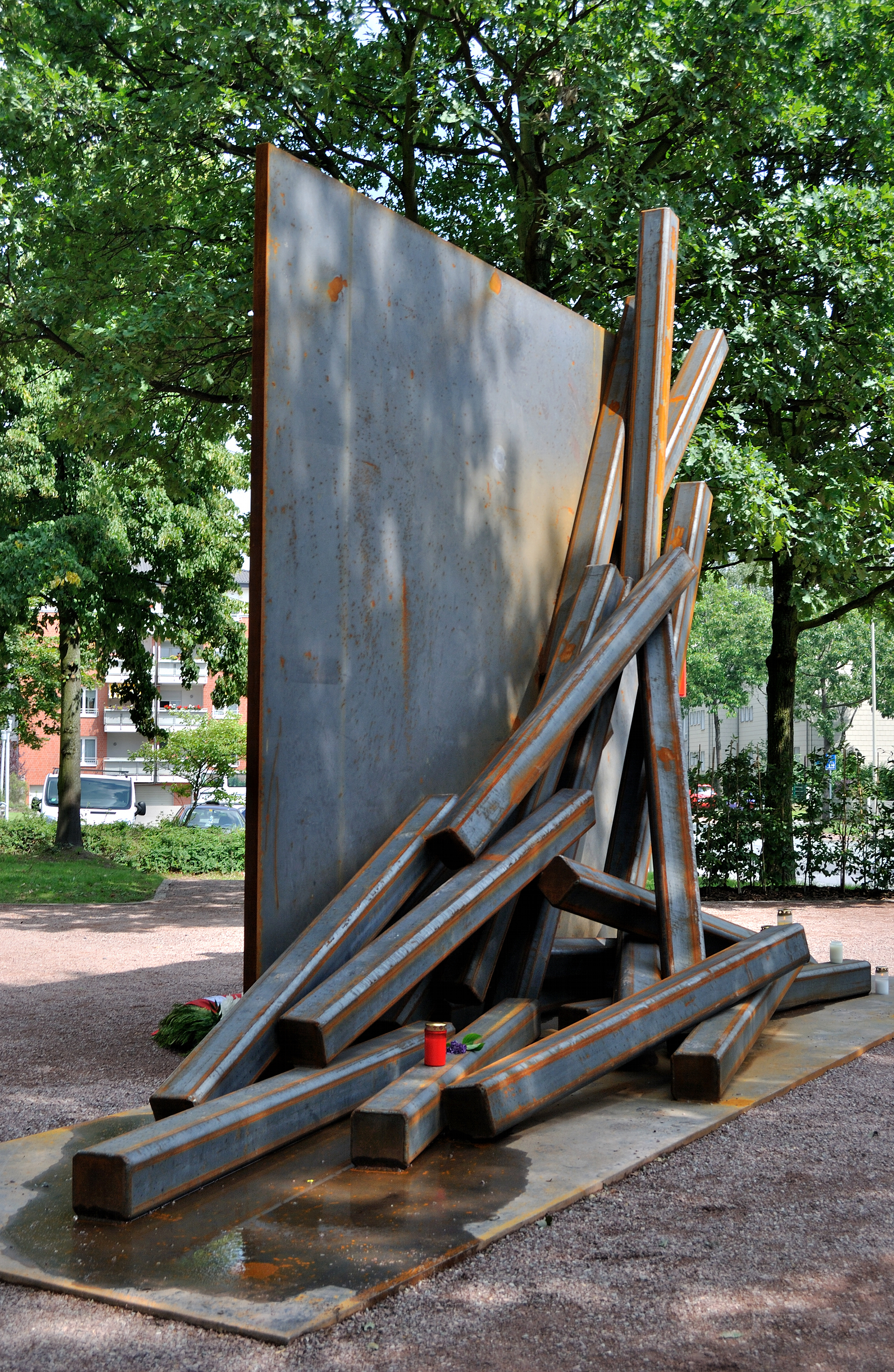
Monument to the victims

A total of 21 people died, 13 women and 8 men, aged between 18 and 38 years. Fourteen of the fatalities were German, including seven men and seven women. Among the seven casualties of other nationalities were two Spanish women aged 21 and 22 years, a 38-year-old Chinese woman living in Germany, a 22-year-old man from the Netherlands, a 21-year-old woman from Italy, a 21-year-old woman from Bosnia, and a 27-year-old woman from Australia. Fifteen died at the site, six died in hospital.

== Immediate aftermath ==
Police chose not to close down the event, fearing that doing so could spark another panic. Nearby motorway A59, which was closed during the whole Love Parade, functioned as an access route for emergency services.

German Chancellor Angela Merkel and German President Christian Wulff expressed their sorrow and condolences for the victims.

During a press conference on 25 July, organiser Rainer Schaller stated that there would never again be another Love Parade, out of respect for those who lost their lives, and the festival was permanently cancelled. Schaller blamed the deaths on police mistakes in crowd control. The North Rhine-Westphalia interior minister rejected this and assigned all the blame to Schaller, his company Lopavent, their security concept and the festival personnel.

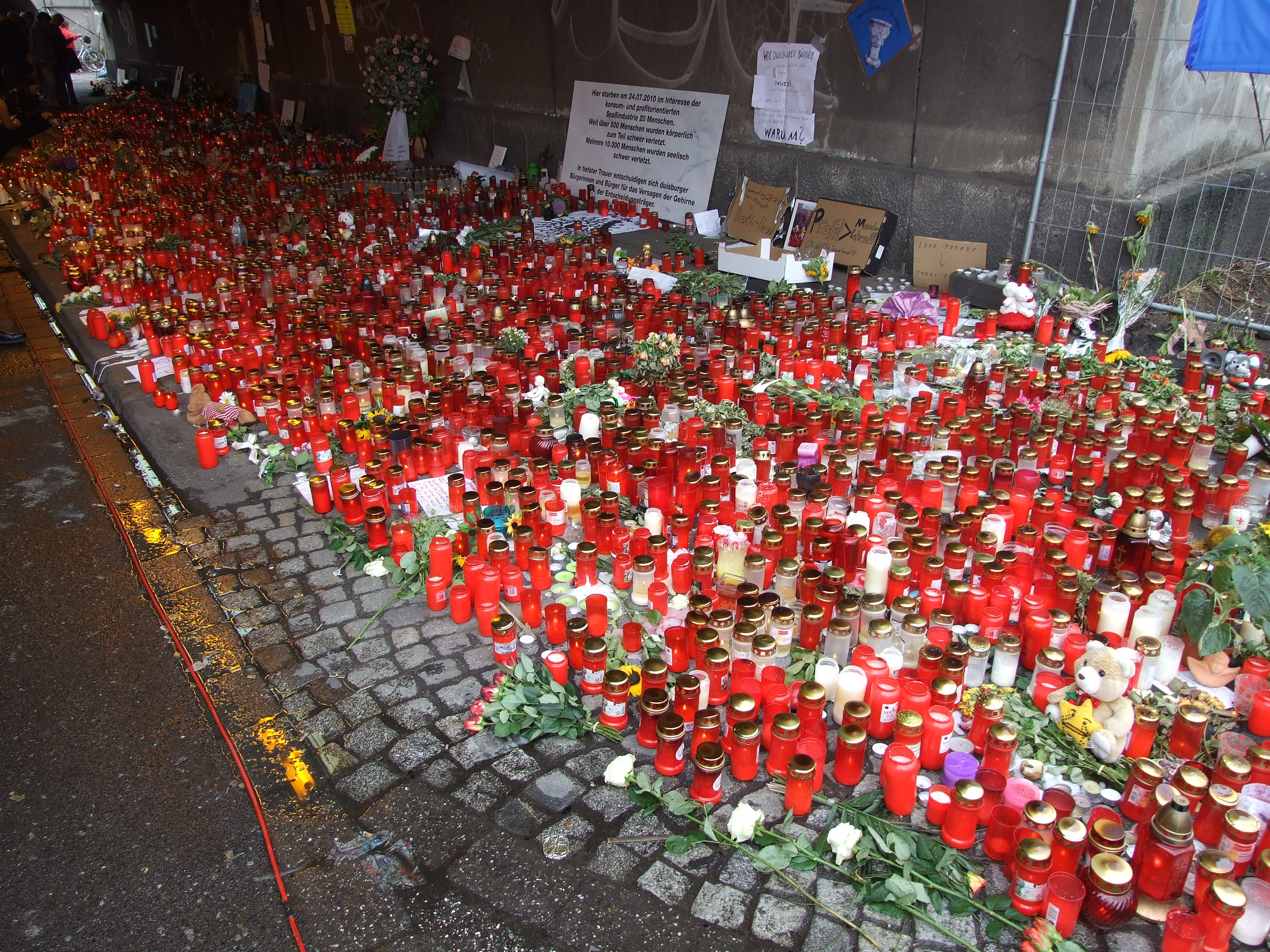
Candles near where the disaster took place

A local resident published internal documents of the city administration regarding the planning of Love Parade. The city government reacted by securing a court order on 16 August forcing the removal of the documents from the site on which it was hosted. On 20 August 2010, WikiLeaks released a publication entitled Loveparade 2010 Duisburg planning documents, 2007–2010, which comprised 43 internal documents regarding the Love Parade 2010, from the Duisburg police, contractors at the parade and other parties involved from 2007 to 2010.

== Aftermath ==
=== Investigation ===
The German police and State's Attorney (Staatsanwaltschaft) opened a criminal investigation. In 2016, a Duisburg court rejected the case, stating that the prosecutors had failed to "establish proof for the acts of negligence the defendants have been charged with, and for their causality". Central to the court's concerns were numerous flaws in the report by professor Keith Still, a British crowd safety expert from Manchester Metropolitan University, which formed the basis of the charges.

The report's initial version from 2011 was described by Süddeutsche Zeitung as "sloppily written and full of errors"; the judges subjected it to more than 70 follow-up questions over the next few years and eventually called it "unusable due to professor Still's serious violations of the basic duties of an expert witness." Keith Still was also criticized by newspapers and the victims' attorney for disregarding possible mistakes by the police, causing the prosecutors to only include staff of the event organizer and the city among the ten defendants it charged.

=== Prosecutions ===
In April 2017, a Higher Regional Court (Oberlandesgericht) decided that a criminal trial against 10 festival organizers and city employees should go ahead. It ruled that there was a "sufficient probability" of convictions and that the lower court (Landgericht) had set "overly high demands" of the chances of conviction to make its decision. The Higher Court dismissed several key aspects of the lower court's judgment, including ruling that evidence from Keith Still was admissible.

The trial started on 8 December 2017 in Düsseldorf. Six Duisburg city officials and four LopaVent festival organizers were charged with negligent manslaughter and inflicting bodily harm. In February 2019, charges against seven defendants were dropped. In May 2020, the court terminated the trial of the remaining defendants without a verdict, finding that their alleged culpability was minor and that the 10-year statute of limitations might lapse before the completion of the trial, especially given the COVID-19 pandemic and related restrictions.

=== Recall of Duisburg mayor ===
Duisburg's mayor Adolf Sauerland was widely criticized in the aftermath of the disaster. In July 2010, several hundred people rallied at Duisburg's city hall, demanding his resignation while depicting him at the gallows. The protesters claimed that Sauerland had been aware of sub-standard security provisions for the festival, but pushed his administration to approve the plans nonetheless. Sauerland refused calls for his resignation.

An attempt to oust Sauerland as mayor failed in September 2010, because the required two-thirds majority of the city council did not vote for his removal. Opponents then collected signatures, forcing a recall election. Sauerland, a member of the Christian Democrats, was removed at the 12 February 2012 election. The recall was supported by labor unions and by opposition parties (the Social Democrats, Greens, and Left), who blamed Sauerland for flawed planning of the festival, charges that Sauerland denied. In the recall election, 130,000 people voted to recall Sauerland, while 21,500 voted to retain him in office.

== Depiction in media ==
The incident is directly referred to with footage in the 2011 documentary Life in a Day. In 2010, a song titled "Remember Love" was produced by Paul van Dyk, Paul Oakenfold and Armin van Buuren with the proceeds going to the families of the victims of the disaster.

In 2014, German rock band Axxis released a song titled "21 Crosses", which demands the truth about who was to blame, with the names of the killed victims being recited at the end of the song.

The German television drama film Life Afterwards (German: "Das Leben danach"), filmed and edited by director Nicole Weegmann, is from the perspective of a traumatised survivor, portrayed by actress Jella Haase. The 90-minute feature film was first broadcast on ARD on 27 September 2017.

There is a book Dance or Die: Die Loveparade-Katastrophe. Ein Roman by Jessika Westen, published in June 2020.

There was a documentary episode about the disaster in TV series "What Went Wrong? Countdown to Catastrophe" (season 2, episode 5, 2021).

== See also ==
- List of fatal crowd crushes
- Herd behaviour
- Crowd control
