= El Bocho =

Berlin Street Artist

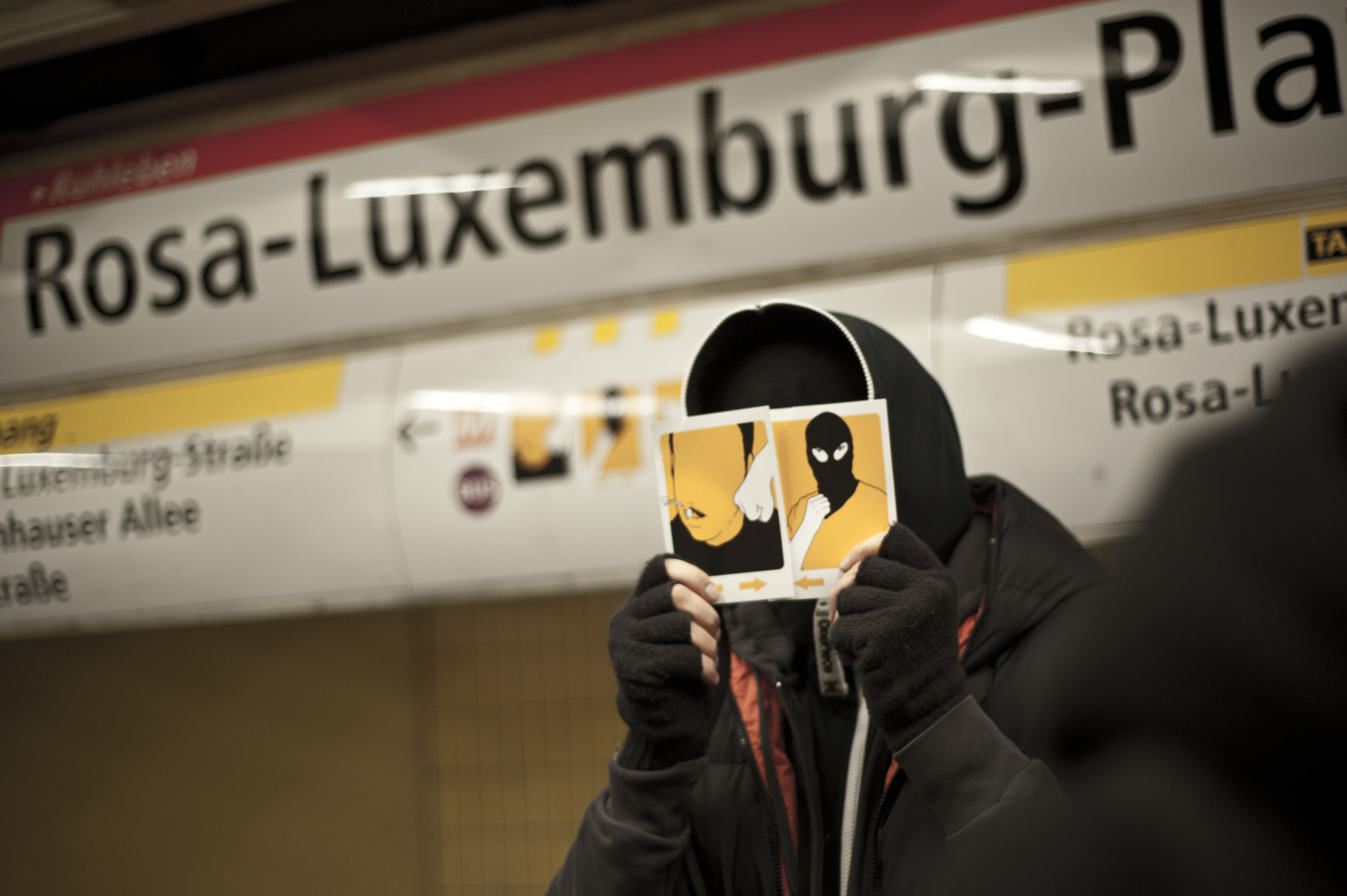
- El Bocho applying stickers from his "Violence" series. Berlin, November 2012
- Known for: characters, especially Little Lucy
- Style: graffiti characters
- Website: elbocho.net

El Bocho (Little Donkey) is the Mexican nickname of a street artist from Spain, who works in Berlin.

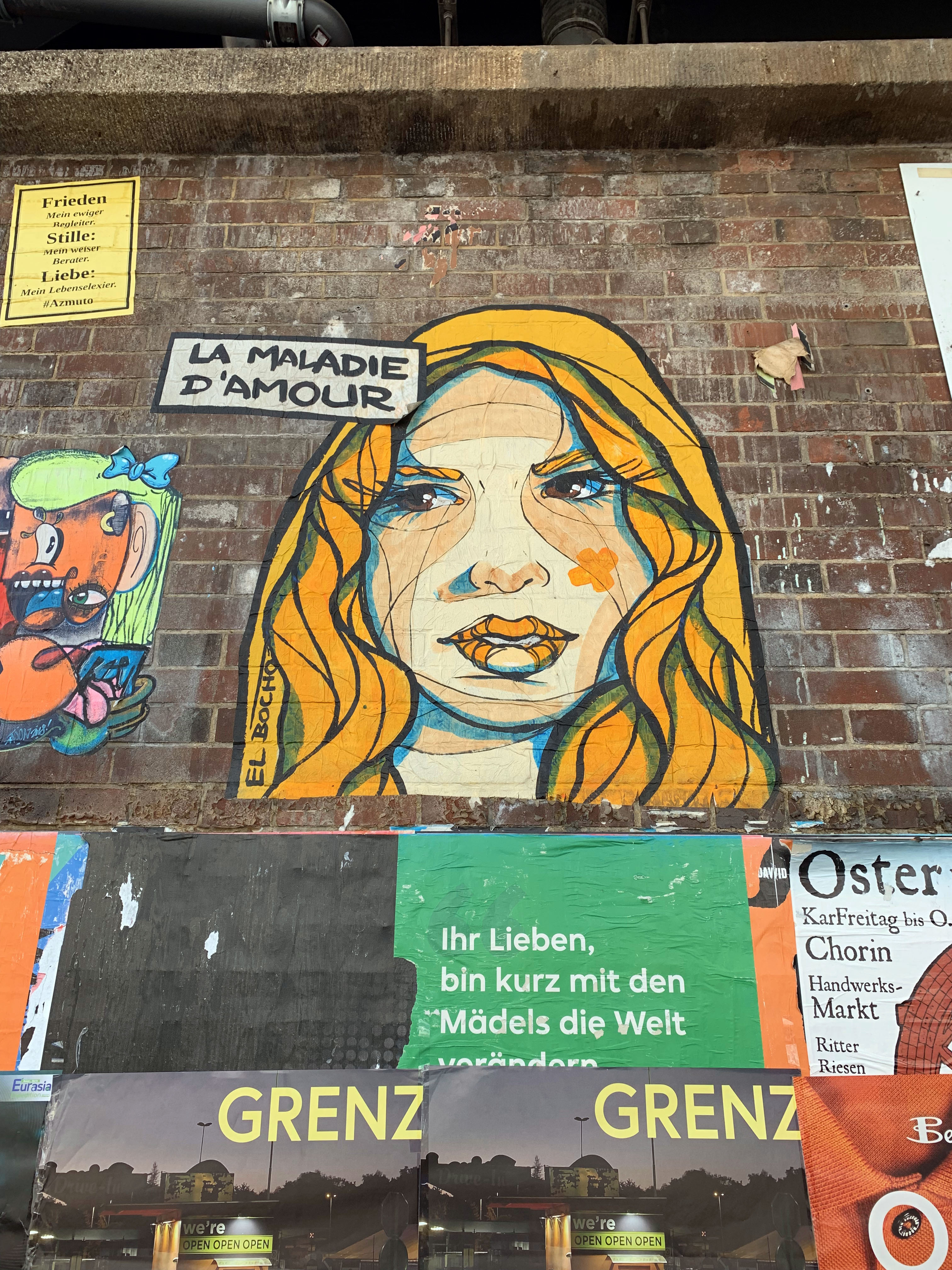
El Bocho, Hackescher Markt, Berlin, Germany

== Career ==
El Bocho started graffiti in 1997. Spanish-born El Bocho, formally lived in Frankfurt, is a former illustrator and typographer, who has published his works in numerous newspapers, including Frankfurter Allgemeine, he now currently works as a graffiti artist, depicting many styles from the macabre to the romantic with giant wheatpasted cut-outs, stencils, and installations, some up to 20 ft tall, which he hangs on Berlin's walls at night.

In 2003, El Bocho created a signature character, the Little Lucy doll, based on a 1970s Czech TV series, Lucy—Streets bugaboo. In 2003, El Bocho created a signature symbol, the Little Lucy doll, based on a 1970s Czech TV series, Lucy—Streets bugaboo. In El Bocho's art, Lucy maltreats her cat but the cat survives all the murder attempts. El Bocho also creates portraits of women he calls “Citizens” using the same stylistic elements to make them recognisable.

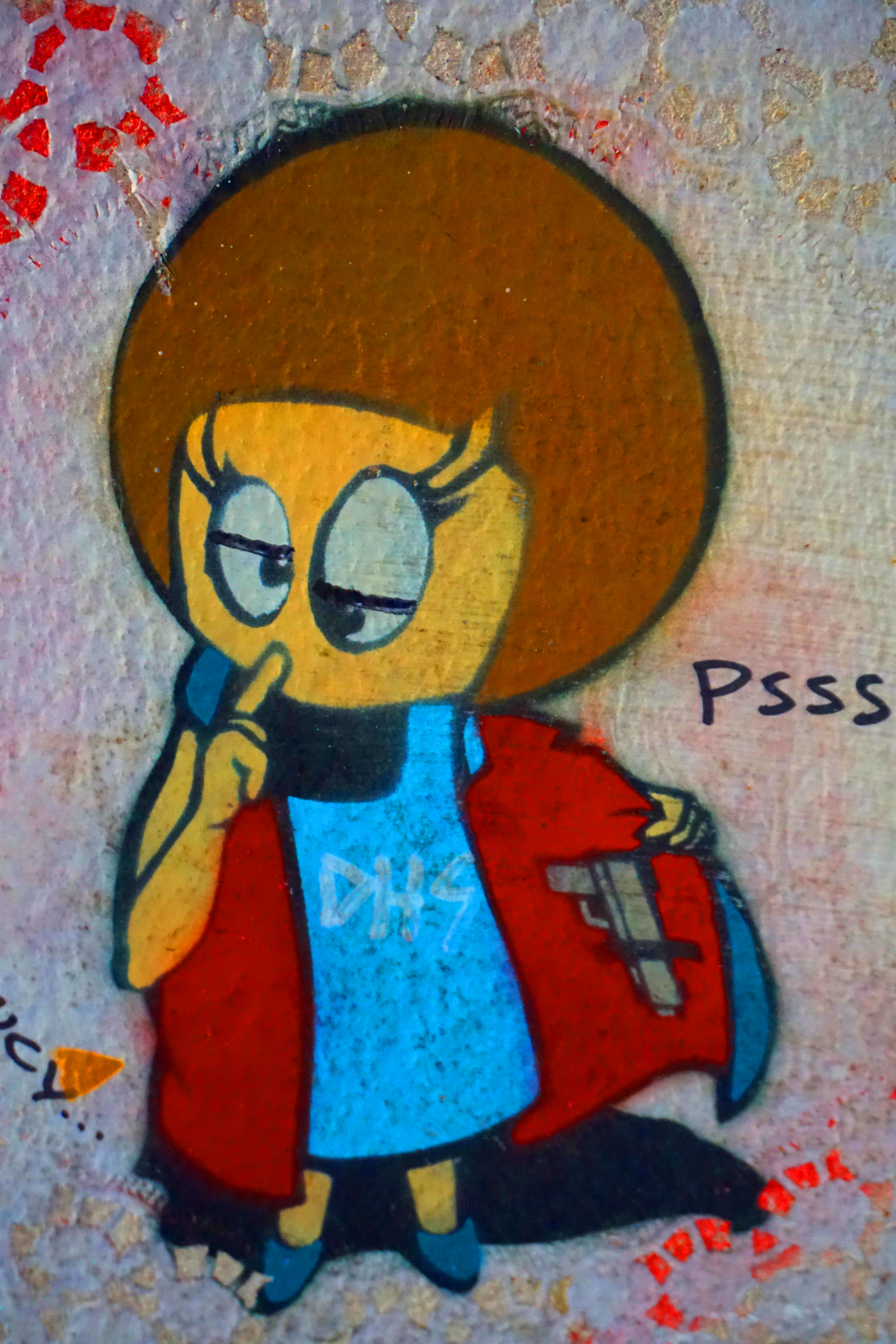
Little Lucy of El Bocho, Berlin 2015, Germany

In July 2009, El Bocho made eco-friendly bags.

=== Gallery of the character "Little Lucy" ===
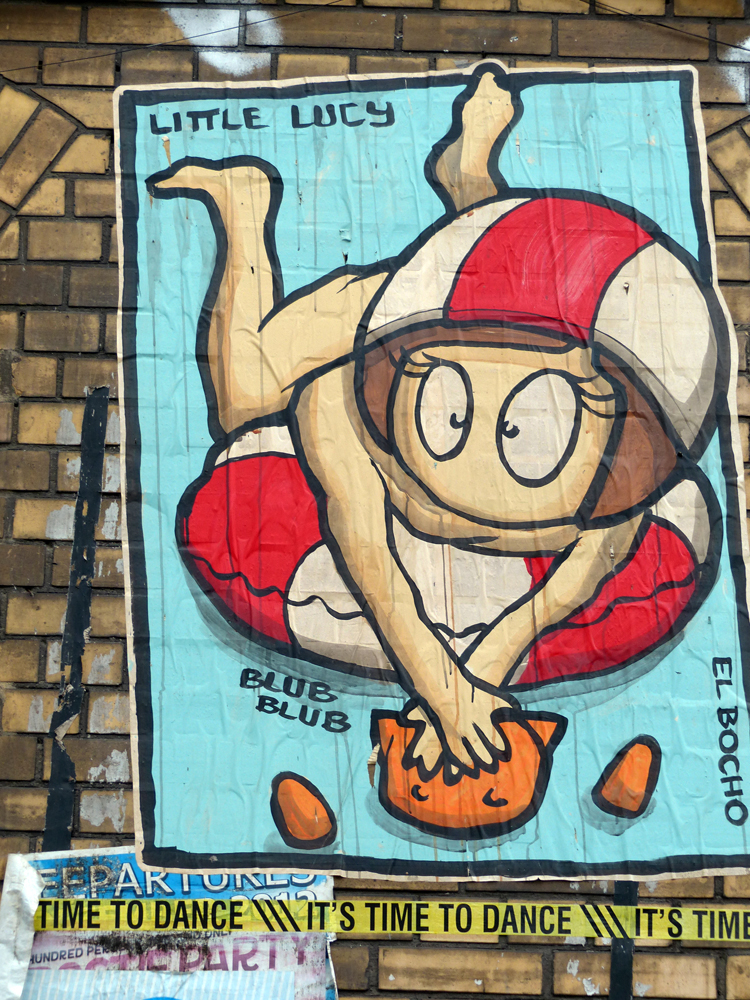
"Blub Blub", Paste-up Berlin, (Germany)

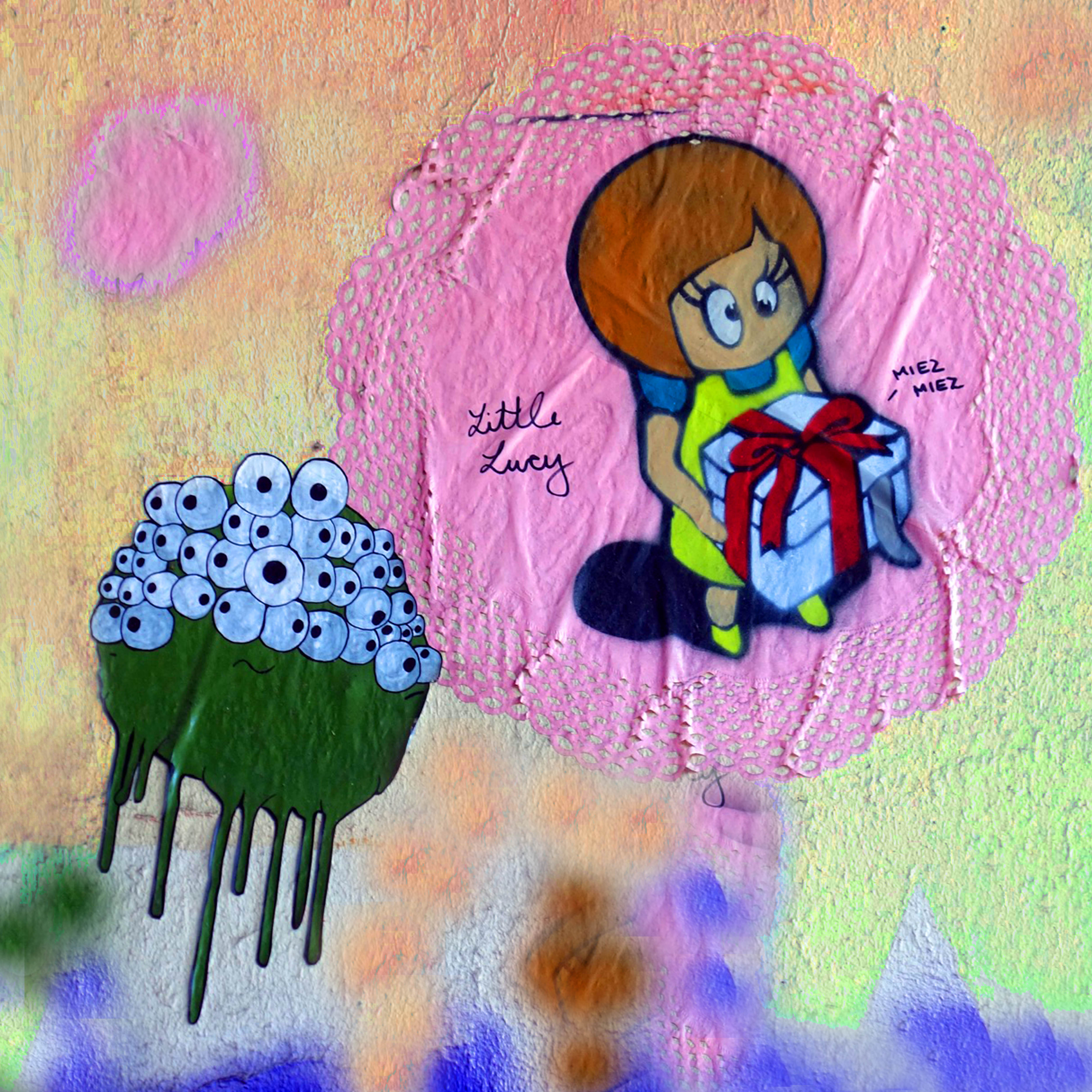
"Miez, Miez. Kitty, kitty", Paste-up, Hamburg 2015, (Germany)

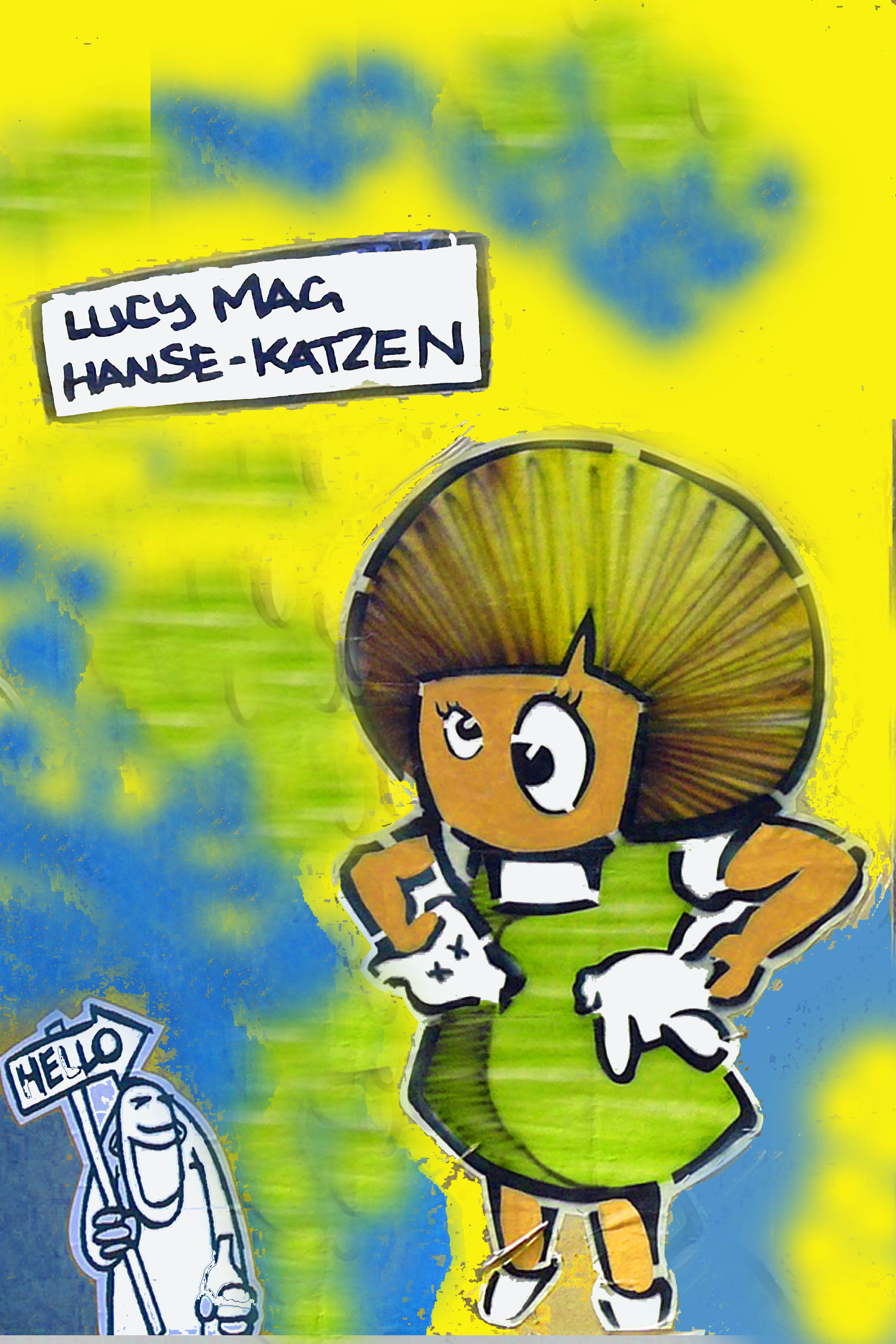
"Lucy mag Hanse-Katzen. Lucy likes Hanseatic cats", Paste-up, Hamburg 2015, (Germany)

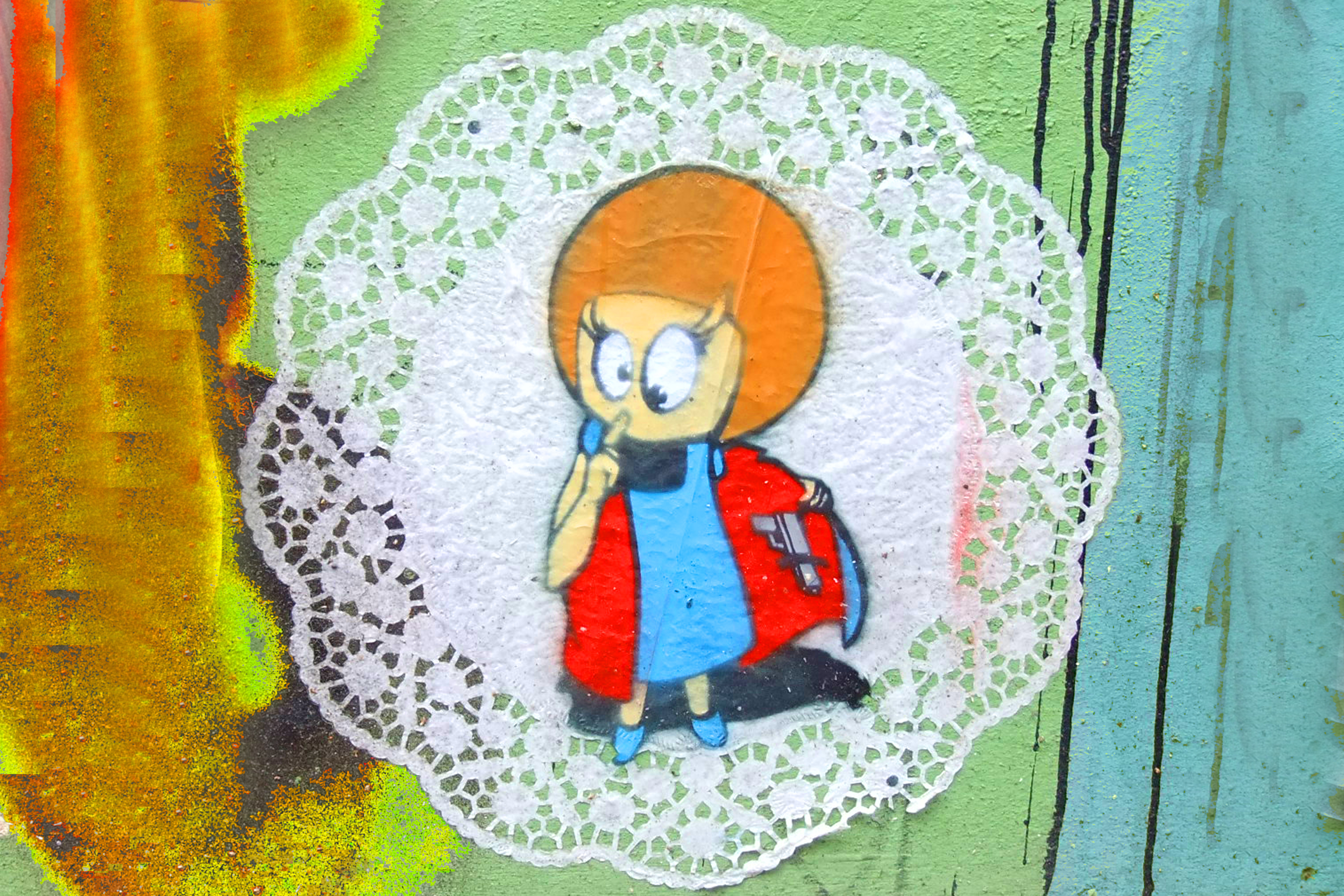
"Psssst", Paste-up, Hamburg 2015, (Germany)

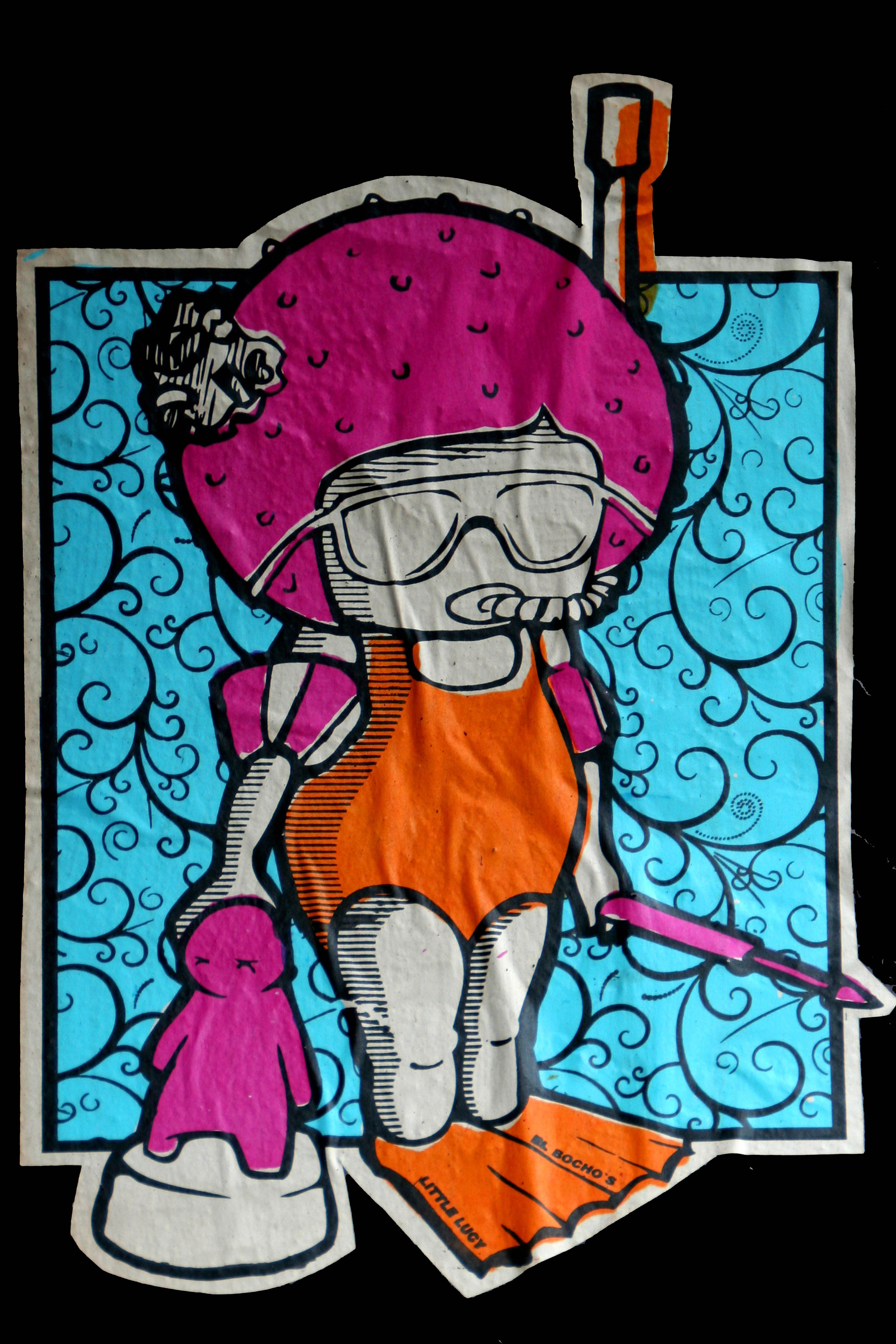
Paste-up, Hamburg 2015, (Germany)

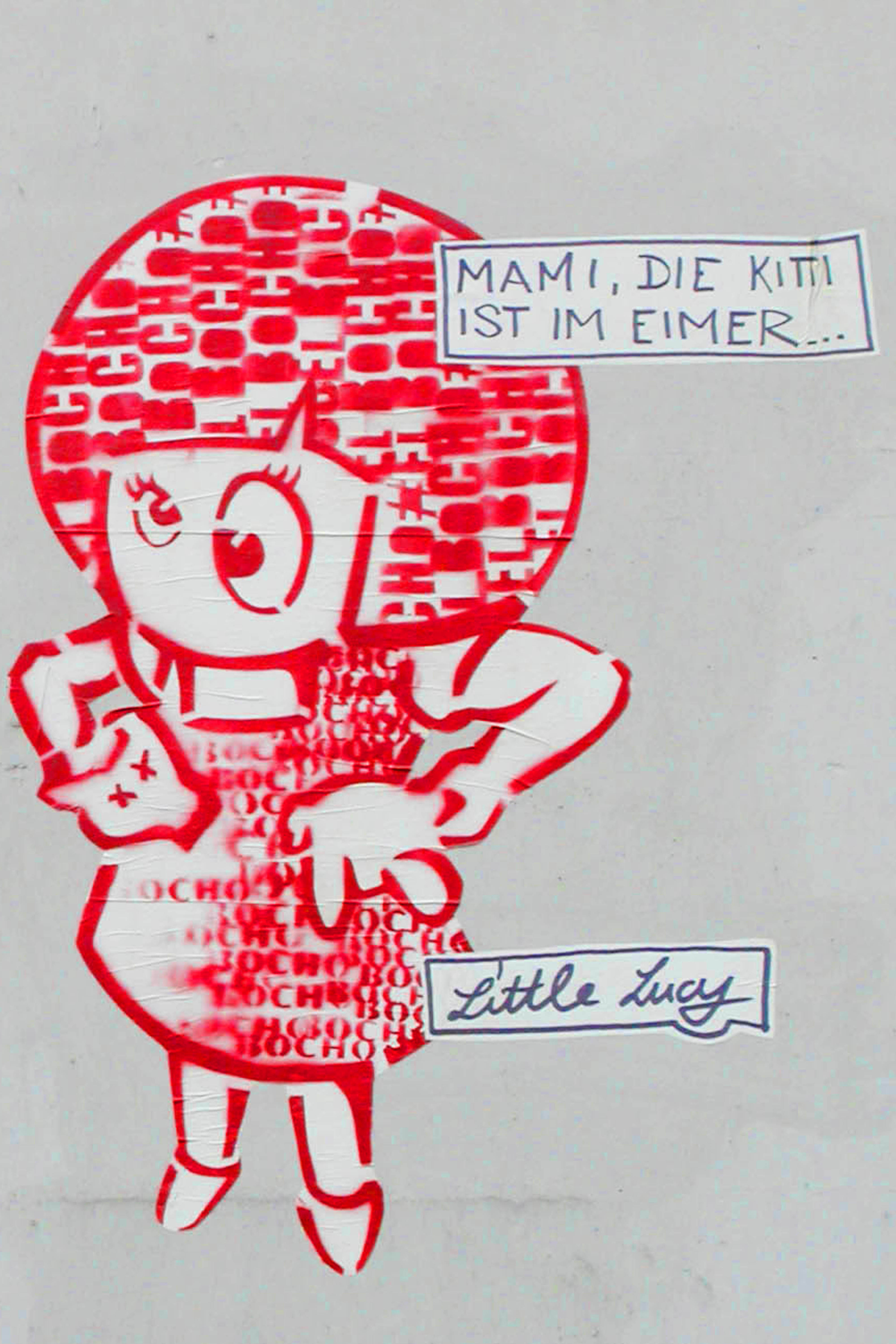
"Mami die Kitty ist im Eimer", Paste-up, Trier 2017, (Germany)

=== General Gallery ===
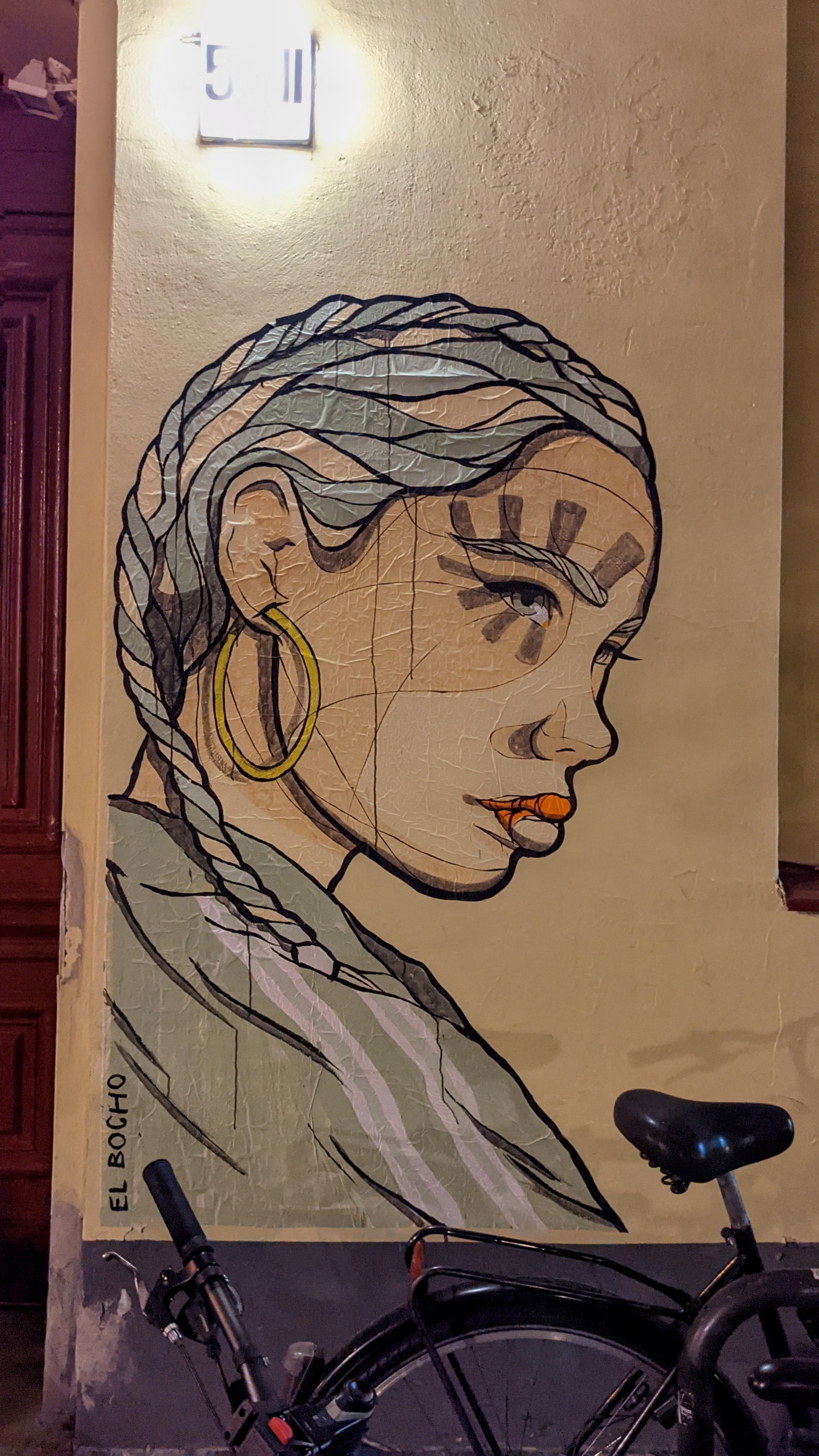
This is a Street Art Painting by El-Bocho

== Exhibitions (selection) ==
- 2016: Kenya, Nairobi Muralpainting
- 2016: Tokyo, solo show
- 2015: Ostrale Dresden, Germany
- 2014: Rosenheim, Germany, Museum - Municipal Gallery
- 2013: Völklingen, UrbanArt Biennale (Völklinger Hütte), Germany
- 2013: Cologne, Germany, Art Cologne,
- 2012: Ludwigsburg, Germany, Kunstverein,
- 2011: Permm, Russia, Museum of Contemporary Art (Музей современного искусства)
- 2009: Berlin, Germany, City Bath Wedding
- 2009: Berlin, Germany. Urban Affairs/Tape-Art-World-Record
- 2009: Hamburg, Germany, Mono Concept
- 2009: Karlsruhe, Germany, Art Karlsruhe
- 2009: London, Bricklane Gallery
- 2009: Sao Paulo, Brasilia, Red Bull "HOUSE OF ART
- 2008: Berlin, Germany, Urban Affairs
- 2008: Berlin, Germany, Sticker Museum

2007: Naples, Italy, Bazar-one
