= Schlüsselfeld =

- Town
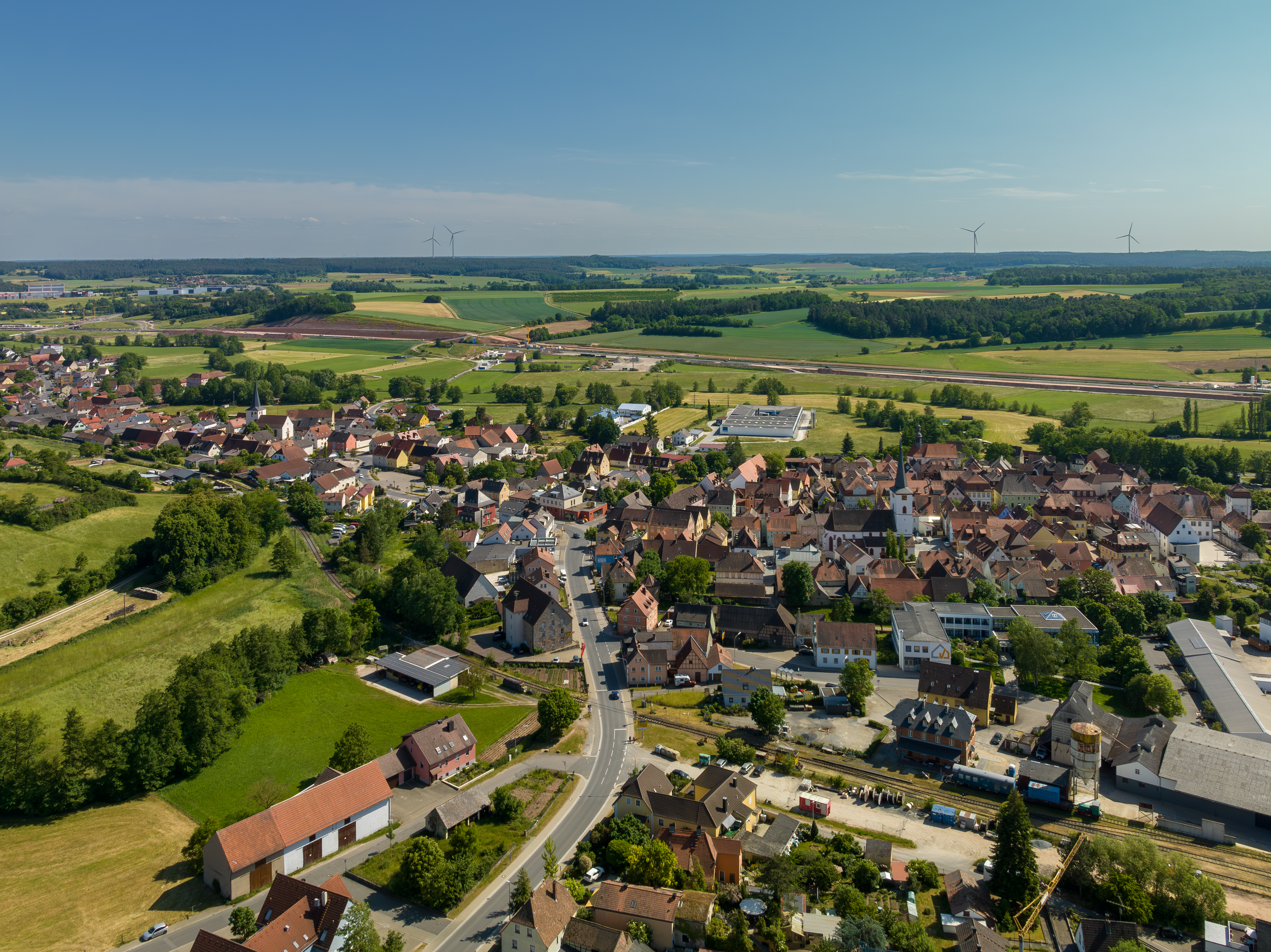
- Aerial view of Schlüsselfeld

- Coat of arms

- Location of Schlüsselfeld within Bamberg district
- Interactive map of Schlüsselfeld
- Location within Germany Location within Bavaria
- Coordinates: 49°46′N 10°37′E
- Country: Germany
- State: Bavaria
- Admin. region: Oberfranken
- District: Bamberg
- Subdivisions: 22 Ortsteile

Government
  - Mayor (2020–26): Johannes Krapp (CSU)

Area
  - Total: 70.24 km^{2} (27.12 sq mi)
- Elevation: 300 m (980 ft)

Population (2025-12-31)
  - Total: 5,895
  - Density: 83.93/km^{2} (217.4/sq mi)
- Time zone: UTC+01:00 (CET)
  - Summer (DST): UTC+02:00 (CEST)
- Postal codes: 96132
- Dialling codes: 09552
- Vehicle registration: BA
- Website: www.schluesselfeld.de

Schlüsselfeld (German pronunciation: [ˈʃlʏsl̩ˌfɛlt]) is a town on the southwestern edge of the Upper Franconian district (Landkreis) of Bamberg

== Geography ==
Schlüsselfeld lies 24 km southwest of Bamberg in the Steigerwald (forest) in the valley of the Reiche Ebrach, 299 m above sea level.

=== Constituent communities ===
The town of Schlüsselfeld is made up of 22 Ortsteile, which for the most part were independent communities until administrative reform:

- Aschbach
- Attelsdorf
- Bernroth
- Debersdorf
- Eckersbach
- Elsendorf
- Fallmeisterei
- Güntersdorf
- Heuchelheim
- Hohn am Berg
- Hopfenmühle
- Lach
- Obermelsendorf
- Possenfelden
- Rambach bei Schlüsselfeld
- Reichmannsdorf
- Schlüsselfeld
- Thüngbach
- Thüngfeld
- Untermelsendorf
- Wüstenbuch
- Ziegelsambach

The town also has these traditional rural land units, known in German as Gemarkungen (most are former independent communities retained as cadastral areas):

- Aschbach
- Eckersbach
- Elsendorf
- Heuchelheim
- Reichmannsdorf
- Schlüsselfeld
- Thüngfeld
- Untermelsendorf
- Ziegelsambach

All share names with the town's constituent communities as it is traditional for a Gemarkung to be named after a town or village lying nearby.

From 1972 to 1978, Schlüsselfeld belonged to Middle Franconia.

=== Climate ===
Schlüsselfeld's average yearly temperature is 8.24 °C.

== History ==
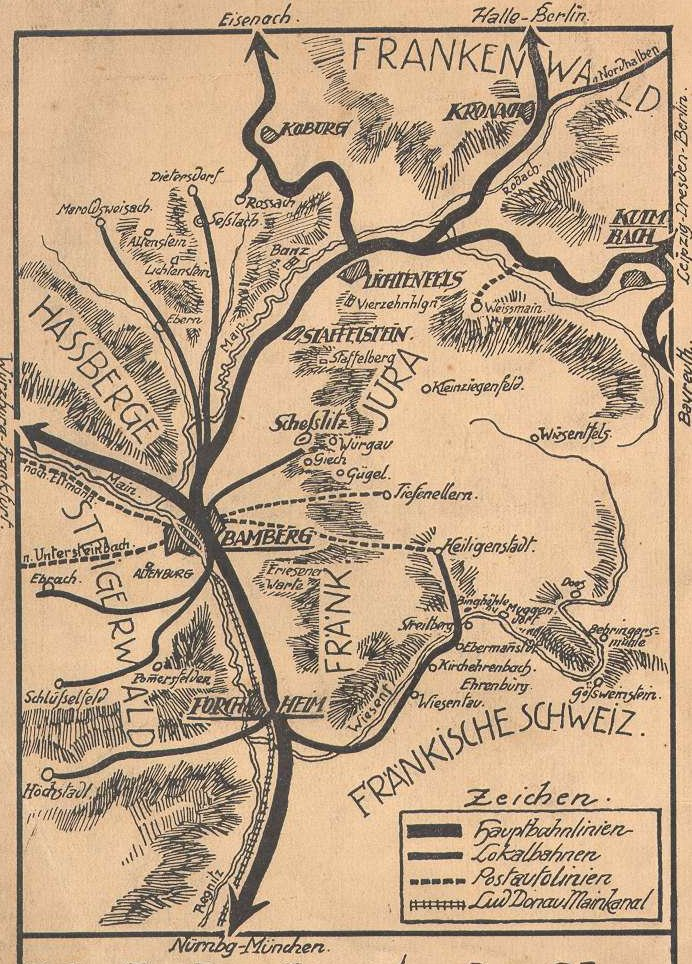
Roadmap from 1912 with Schlüsselfeld at lower left

Schlüsselfeld was founded on 10 June 1336 by Konrad von Schlüsselberg. He was granted the right to found a town by Holy Roman Emperor Ludwig IV. After its founder's death, Schlüsselfeld passed to the Bishops of Bamberg and Würzburg. Through a compromise, Würzburg also acquired Bamberg's share of the town in 1390.

In 1396, the market town of Schlüsselfeld had its town rights confirmed.

The Würzburg Bishops built Schlüsselfeld up into an Amt and chose as their Amt seat the Thüngfeld Castle (Thüngfelder Schloss).

The town hall built in 1723 declares the following in a Latin inscription: “This house hates unrest, loves peace, punishes crime, upholds the law, honours goodness. ”

As part of the Würzburg High Monastery, the tithing centre (Centamt) of Schlüsselfeld was secularized in Bavaria’s favour in 1803, passed in 1805 with the Peace of Pressburg to the newly formed Grand Duchy of Würzburg, and then eventually, after territorial adjustments in 1810, was returned to Bavaria. In the course of administrative reform in Bavaria, today’s community came into being under the Gemeindeedikt (“Community Edict”) of 1818.

=== Religion ===
Of the town's inhabitants, 4,262 belong to the Catholic Church, 1,217 to the Evangelical Church and 588 to other or no religious bodies.

=== Population development ===
Within town limits, 4,780 inhabitants were counted in 1970, 5,034 in 1987 and 5,711 in 2000. Over the next six years, the population rose and on 31 December 2006, it had reached 5,824.

== Politics ==
The mayor is Johannes Krapp (CSU).

In 1999, municipal tax revenue, converted to euros, amounted to €2,715,000 of which business taxes (net) amounted to €817,000.

=== Town council ===
Town council consists of:

- CSU 9 seats
- SPD 4 seats
- Freie Wählergemeinschaft 3 seats
- Unabhängige Bürgergemeinschaft 3 seats
- Überparteilich Christliche Wählergemeinschaft 1 seat

=== Coat of arms ===
Schlüsselfeld's arms might heraldically be described thus: In gules a key argent per bend sinister with the bit upturned, flanked per bend each side by a mullet of six Or.

The key refers not only to the town's name (“Schlüsselfeld” literally means “Key Field” in German), but also by its charges and tinctures to the arms borne by the old Lords of Schlüsselberg, who have since died out, but who were once the town's owners and founders. The town was first mentioned in history as Konrad von Schlüsselberg's property. The current coat of arms appeared for the first time in a seal from the 16th century. The town flag is gold, white and red.

== Culture and sightseeing ==
Worth seeing in the Schlüsselfeld area are the following:

- in Schlüsselfeld: the Town Gate Tower with remains of the town wall and two round towers, the Petrusbrunnen (fountain), the Old Town Hall with pillory, the New Town Hall, the Gothic parish church, the Klein-Mariazell im Steigerwald church (with a copy of the Icon of Mariazell in the Steiermark, Austria)
- in Aschbach: the Baroque castle, the Mariä-Himmelfahrt church, the Evangelical church with Marienaltar
- in Reichmannsdorf: Dientzenhof Castle
- in Heuchelheim the Dreifrankenstein

== Economy and infrastructure ==
The town of Schlüsselfeld lies at the common point of all three of Franconia's Regierungsbezirke, right on the A 3 (Würzburg-Nuremberg) with its Schlüsselfeld interchange, and is acknowledged as a smaller centre.
