= Tiffiny Hall =

Australian television personality and author

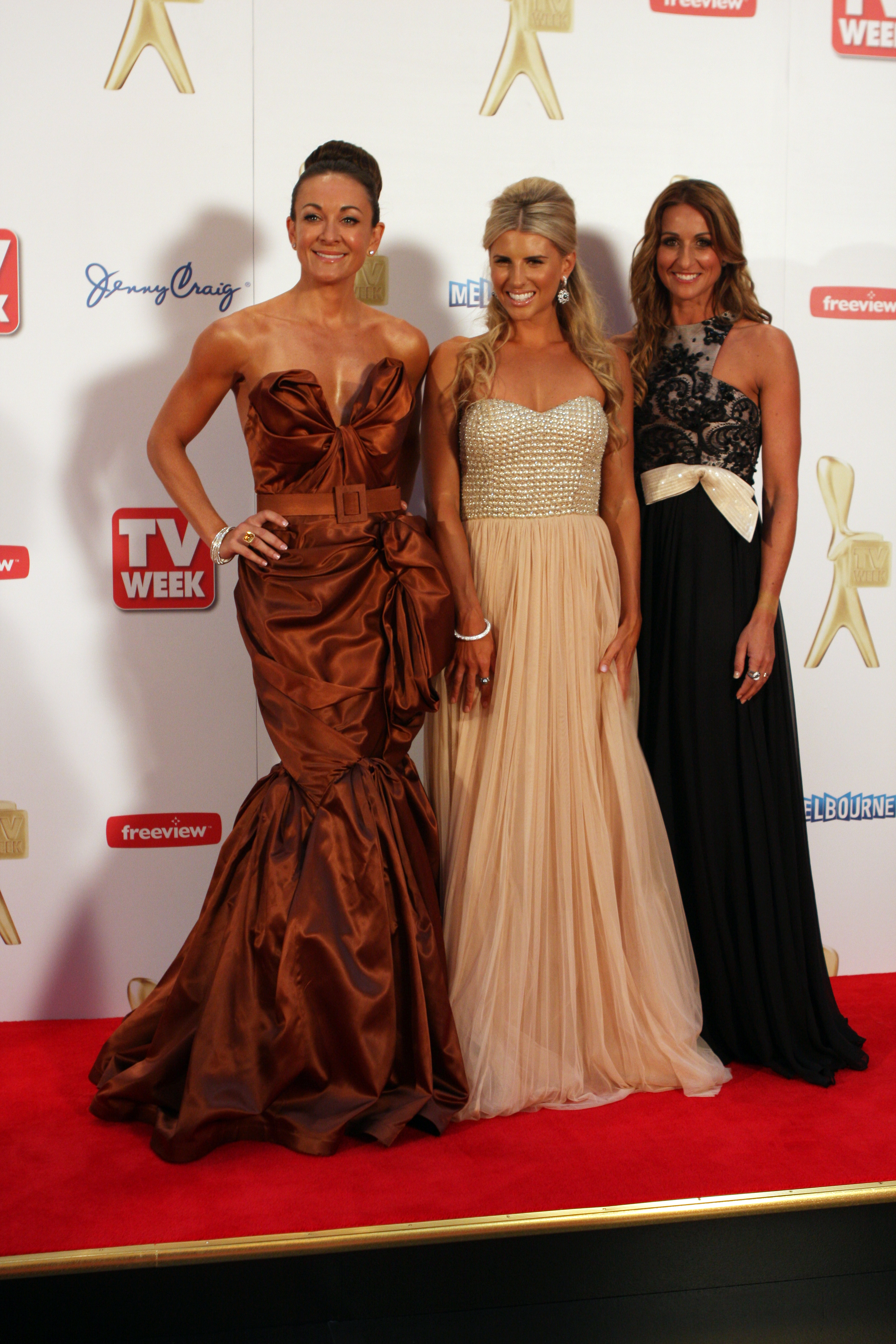
- Left to right, Michelle Bridges, Tiffiny Hall and Hayley Lewis (2011)
- Born: Tiffiny Elizabeth Hall; 11 July 1984 (age 42); Melbourne, Victoria, Australia
- Occupations: Personal trainer, author, television personality, journalist
- Spouse: Ed Kavalee (m. 2014)
- Children: 2

Tiffiny Elizabeth Hall (born 11 July 1984) is an Australian personal trainer, author, journalist and television personality best known from television appearances on Gladiators, the morning show The Circle (2010), The Biggest Loser Australia: Families (2011) and The Biggest Loser Australia: Singles (2012).

== Background and education ==
Hall was born in Melbourne, Victoria to Martin and Jeanette Hall. She is the oldest of three siblings, Bridgette and Lleyton. She grew up in the suburb of Essendon. Her parents own a Taekwondo centre headquartered in Tullamarine. Hall attended Lowther Hall Anglican Grammar School, where her English teacher was Australian writer John Marsden.

Hall graduated from the University of Melbourne in 2007 with a Bachelor of Arts (Media and Communications) majoring in creative writing and print journalism, and a Diploma in Modern Languages (French). Hall practises the Korean martial art of Taekwondo and is a Sixth Dan Black Belt.

== Career ==
After writing for the Herald Sun and freelancing for various magazines, Hall joined the cast of the Australian TV revival of Gladiators in 2008. Her Gladiator name was Angel.

In 2010, she joined morning television show The Circle as a regular health and fitness presenter and weightloss coach to host Chrissie Swan.

In 2011, Hall joined The Biggest Loser: Families as the newest addition to the full-time cast of trainers in the sixth season of the show. During the show's three months on air she wrote a blog at the official Biggest Loser website and a weekly column for the magazine OK!. Her second non-fiction book Weightloss Warrior: How to win the battle within was released in April 2011. Tiffiny returned to train the White Team in The Biggest Loser Singles for the 2012/13 series.

Hall released her third and fourth health books, Fatloss For Good and a cookbook called Lighten Up, in 2012.

In 2012, Hall released the children's novel White Ninja, the first in her Roxy Ran trilogy of children's books published by HarperCollins. The sequel Red Samurai was released in April 2013 and the third, titled Black Warrior, in March 2014.

In 2019, she and her husband released a book entitled "A First Time For Everything" which is about their first year as parents.

In March 2025, Hall was announced to be competing on the forthcoming ninth season of Network 10's The Amazing Race Australia alongside her husband Ed Kavalee. The couple were eliminated after the first leg, ultimately finishing in last position.

In August 2025, Hall announced she had sold her business, TiffXO to 28 by Sam Wood, who starred in third season of The Bachelor, an Australian TV series.

== Personal life ==
In 2014, Hall married comedian, radio host, actor and film maker Ed Kavalee. In September 2017, Hall gave birth to their first child. In May 2022, Hall gave birth to their second child.

In 2021, Hall announced she is suffering from Chronic Fatigue Syndrome, which she describes as having her whole body covered in cement.
