= The Biggest Loser Australia: Couples 2 =

- Genre: Reality television, Game show
- Created by: NBC and Network Ten
- Developed by: Fremantle
- Presented by: Hayley Lewis
- Starring: Michelle Bridges; Shannan Ponton; Steve Willis (The Commando); Dr Norman Swan; Janella Purcell
- Opening theme: "Lift" by Shannon Noll
- Ending theme: "Lift" by Shannon Noll
- Country of origin: Australia
- Original language: English
- No. of episodes: 67 (list of episodes)

Production
- Executive producers: Paul Franklin; Jonathan Summerhayes; Tara McWilliams

Original release
- Network: Network Ten
- Release: 31 January – 18 April 2010

Related
- Season 4 (2009); Season 6 (2011); The Biggest Loser (American TV series)

The fifth season of the Australian version of the original NBC American reality television series The Biggest Loser, known as The Biggest Loser Australia: Couples 2, premiered on 31 January 2010 on Network Ten. This season saw Australia's first female Biggest Loser. 41-year-old education assistant Lisa was the winner, dropping 56.2 kg from her 121.9 kg starting weight - or 46.10% - to become the first woman to win the competition. Also, she is the first contestant to double her prize money since she was crowned The Biggest Loser with the Double bracelet on her wrist.

== Host and personalities ==
- Host: Hayley Lewis (new host)
- Trainers: Shannan Ponton, Michelle Bridges, Steve Willis ("The Commando")
- Masterclass: Dr Norman Swan (Doctor and Medical Journalist), Janella Purcell (Masterclass Chef)
- Nutrition Consultant. Professor Clare Collins PhD FDAA

== Game variations ==
- Couples: Season Five began with contestants split into 9 teams of two, each with a pre-existing relationship. These couples were divided into two groups for training purposes only - the contestants undergo challenges, Temptations and eliminations in their pairs. Like the previous season, this season was set to have 10 teams, but due to the arrest of one contestant before broadcast (see Production and release), all references to the 10th team (light blue) were removed in the broadcast episodes they originally appeared in.
- Double or Nothing bracelets: This feature was first introduced in the last season and is featured again. During the season, one contestant is given a gold bracelet (the "Double" bracelet shown with two-dollar signs) and another contestant is given a silver bracelet (the "Nothing" bracelet written with the word "Nothing"). Should the holder of the Double bracelet become this season's winner, he or she will win double the normal prize money (normal prize money is $200,000, so double this is $400,000; however, the normal prize amount is reduced if a contestant accepts cash to leave the competition early, and the double prize money is calculated from the reduced normal amount). Should the holder of the Nothing bracelet become this season's winner, he or she will win $0. No contestant can hold both bracelets at the same time, but they can hold one at one time and hold the other at a later time.
- Marathon: In week 1, the contestants were informed that towards the end of the series the eliminated contestants would participate in a full 42 km marathon. This would be the only opportunity presented for the eliminated contestants to return to the game. To train for this event, the contestants participated in several long-distance races over the weeks leading up to the marathon: a 4 km run in week 1, a 10 km run in week 3, and a 21 km half-marathon in week 8. The full marathon was run in week 12.
- No red and blue teams: For the first time this series, there was no red and blue teams.

=== Teams ===
Contestant	Week														
Contestant	1	2	3	4	5	6	7	8	9	10	11	12	13		Finale
Lisa	Principal & Teacher's Aide					Individuals									Final 4
Joe	Twin Brothers					Individuals			Training with The Commando					Individuals	Final 4
Shannon	Best Mates					Individuals									Final 4
Wayne	Coach & Player			New Red Team		Eliminated						Eliminated Contestant	Individuals		Final 4
Daina	Sisters					Individuals	Eliminated					Eliminated Contestant	Individuals	Eliminated	Eliminated Contestant
Phil	The Dads					Individuals			Training with The Commando					Eliminated	Eliminated Contestant
David	The Dads					Individuals							Eliminated		Eliminated Contestant
Phoebe	Aunt & Niece			New Red Team		Individuals						Eliminated Contestant	Eliminated		Eliminated Contestant
Rick	Twin Brothers					Individuals				Eliminated		Eliminated Contestant	Eliminated		Eliminated Contestant
Caitlin	Sisters					Individuals			Eliminated			Eliminated Contestant	Eliminated		Eliminated Contestant
Jarna	Principal & Teacher's Aide					Individuals		Eliminated				Eliminated Contestant	Eliminated		Eliminated Contestant
Chris	Best Mates					Individuals	Left via Temptation								Eliminated Contestant
Elise	Twin Sisters				Eliminated							Eliminated Contestant	Eliminated		Eliminated Contestant
Teneale	Twin Sisters				Eliminated							Eliminated Contestant	Eliminated		Eliminated Contestant
Jenni	Aunt & Niece			Eliminated								Eliminated Contestant	Eliminated		Eliminated Contestant
Geoff	Coach & Player			Left due to medical condition											Eliminated Contestant
Allan	Husband & Wife	Eliminated										Eliminated Contestant	Eliminated		Eliminated Contestant
Romi	Husband & Wife	Eliminated										Eliminated Contestant	Eliminated		Eliminated Contestant

=== Bracelets ===
The two bracelets were introduced in week 1, and have moved around over the course of the series due to Eliminations, non-elimination penalties, biggest loser rewards and challenges. The Double bracelet has the power to double the prize money (to a maximum of $400,000) if worn by the winner of the overall competition, while the Nothing bracelet has the power to deny the prize money (so they win no prize money) if worn by the overall winner. If the wearer of a bracelet is eliminated, that person must choose onto which of the remaining contestants to pass their bracelet. Lisa won TBLC 2010, and was wearing the Double bracelet, but by the finale the prize money had been reduced to $185,000, so she won double that amount ($370,000).

Bracelet	Week														
Bracelet	1	2	3	4	5	6	7	8	9	10	11	12	13		Finale
Double ($$)	Allan	Caitlin				Caitlin			Rick	David	Lisa				
Nothing	Shannon					Shannon					David		Daina	Shannon	Shannon

=== Weigh-ins ===
Weigh-ins occur every week. They show the contestant's weight, previous weight and difference. Every week contestants are weighed in. While the contestants are in "couples", the two couples with the lowest weight loss percentages are eligible for elimination. When the game shifts to "singles", the two players with the lowest weight loss percentages are eligible for elimination. After the finalists are decided, they go home for a certain amount of time to continue their diets at home until the live finale where the "Biggest Loser", the winner, for 2010 is crowned. The contestant's weekly results can be seen below, and are listed in chronological order of elimination with the exception of the finalists, who are listed in order of the place they finish.

Notes

- In week 2, Geoff didn't weigh in as he was in hospital.
- In week 5, it was "All vs. One"; Caitlin & Daina weighed in against the other five couples, comparing the two teams' average percentage weight losses. Caitlin & Daina also had a 2 kg advantage from winning the challenge.
- In week 6, the contestants began weighing in as singles.
- In week 7, a head-to-head competition was in place, similar to "Face-off week" featured on the American Version, so contestants were paired up (with the exception of David who held immunity) and whichever contestant in each pair had a lower percentage of weight loss fell below the yellow line and was eligible for elimination.
- In week 9, Rick gained weight and therefore lost his immunity, as the rules of The Biggest Loser state that if the holder of immunity gains weight at the weigh-in, the immunity is revoked.
- In week 10, there was no elimination, but the contestants still weighed in, and Hayley explained that the player with the lowest weight loss percentage would suffer a penalty. That player was revealed to be David, who had gained weight that week, and so received the penalty, which was to bear the Nothing bracelet. As he already had the Double bracelet, he had to forfeit it. As "Biggest Loser" for the week, Lisa was awarded the choice of choosing another contestant to allocate the Double bracelet. She chose to keep it for herself. In addition, because David gained weight, he was ineligible to take part in the next immunity challenge.
- In week 13, Phil and Joe weighed-in first having returned from training with The Commando in the Northern Territory, and whichever of them recorded a greater percentage weight loss since Day 1 of the competition would stay, and the other would be eliminated. Phil recorded a weight loss of 61.4 kg since Day 1, which was a percentage of 41.80%. Joe recorded a weight loss of 77.7 kg, which was a percentage of 43.19%. Phil was eliminated while Joe remained and his weigh-in result carried over to face off against the other four contestants' weigh-in results as normal.

Contestant	Age	Height	Starting BMI	Ending BMI	Starting weight	Week														Finale	Kilograms Lost	Percentage lost
Contestant	Age	Height	Starting BMI	Ending BMI	Starting weight	1	2	3	4	5	6	7	8	9	10	11	12		13	Finale	Kilograms Lost	Percentage lost
Lisa	41	159	48.2	26.0	121.9	113.2	108.4	104.3	100.3	96.0	89.8	84.7	81.5	78.6	77.2	74.4	X	71.0	70.9	65.7	56.2	46.10%
Joe	20	186	52.0	28.1	179.9	167.6	161.2	154.5	148.7	141.9	132.6	126.5	122.5	115.3	113.3	113.1	X	105.5	102.2	97.2	82.7	45.97%
Shannon	24	183	64.0	37.2	214.3	200.5	193.7	187.3	180.8	174.7	165.0	157.9	150.6	145.1	144.2	138.5	X	132.0	129.0	124.7	89.6	41.81%
Wayne	43	193	43.4	26.5	161.5	147.1	139.5	130.3	124.0	119.9							110.8	102.2	101.1	98.7	62.8	38.89%
Daina	25	174	34.7	25.7	105.2	96.5	92.8	89.1	88.7	83.7	81.5						78.6	75.6	78.0	77.8	27.4	26.05%
Phil	44	189	41.1	26.3	146.9	135.1	129.3	123.3	119.7	112.7	98.0	94.1	99.0	91.2	90.2	89.0	X	84.3	85.5	93.0	53.9	36.69%
David	40	198	42.2	26.4	165.6	149.0	141.5	134.0	129.2	122.9	115.8	113.3	107.8	103.5	103.6	95.4	X	97.3		99.2	66.4	40.10%
Phoebe	19	164	43.1	28.6	116.0	108.9	104.6	101.2	97.4	93.5	87.8	85.0	82.5	80.3	79.5	78.0	TBA			76.9	39.1	33.71%
Rick	20	186	49.9	28.1	172.6	157.8	149.6	142.9	137.4	133.0	122.3	116.6	111.1	111.6			107.2			97.2	75.4	43.68%
Caitlin	23	172	60.6	42.2	179.4	164.2	158.6	153.5	150.6	143.3	136.9	131.5	126.9				121.9			124.8	54.6	30.43%
Jarna	38	171	40.6	25.8	118.8	110.3	106.9	103.3	99.7	97.0	90.5	86.3					80.6			75.5	43.3	36.45%
Chris	26	185	37.7	30.4	128.9	120.5	116.6	112.2	107.2	103.2	LEFT						X			104.2	24.7	19.16%
Elise	24	161	40.4	25.7	104.6	97.6	93.0	90.1	87.7								72.1			66.7	37.9	36.23%
Teneale	24	161	37.6	22.7	97.4	88.4	84.6	81.1	78.7								63.6			58.8	38.6	39.63%
Jenni	47	162	49.8	31.7	130.6	122.4	117.0	113.3									92.9			84.3	46.3	35.45%
Geoff	56	183	48.3	35.1	161.6	147.6	DNW	LEFT									X			117.8	43.8	27.10%
Allan	34	185	45.5	38.4	155.8	147.7											TBA			131.5	24.3	15.60%
Romi	29	154	41.9	36.2	99.3	94.0											87.6			85.8	13.5	13.60%

Contestants

- Winner (among finalists)
- Winner (among eliminated)
- Below the yellow line
- Had immunity for the week
- Gained weight
- Gained weight and below the yellow line
- Had immunity but lost it due to gaining weight, and below the yellow line
- Gained weight, below the yellow line and last person eliminated before finale
- The week's biggest loser
- Had immunity and the week's biggest loser
- DNW - Not weighed in for medical or other reasons
- LEFT - The contestant left the competition before a weigh-in (by choice or challenge)
- Results from the Northern Territory weigh-in
- Results from the eliminated contestants' return weigh-in
- Won weigh-in after returning from training with The Commando, and the week's biggest loser
- Eliminated by losing weigh-in after returning from training with The Commando

BMIs

- Healthy Body Mass Index (less than 25.0 BMI)
- Overweight Body Mass Index (25.0–29.9 BMI)
- Obese Class I (30.0–34.9 BMI)
- Obese Class II Index (35.0–39.9 BMI)
- Obese Class III (40.0 or above)
- Phoebe, in the episode before the beginning of the marathon, stated that had lost 100 grams.

=== Weight Loss History ===
Contestant	Week													Finale
Contestant	1	2	3	4	5	6	7	8	9	10	11	12	13	Finale
Lisa	-8.7	-4.8	-4.1	-4.0	-4.3	-6.2	-5.1	-3.2	-2.9	-1.4	-2.8	-3.4	-0.1	-5.2
Joe	-12.3	-6.4	-6.7	-5.8	-6.8	-9.3	-6.1	-4.0	-7.2	-2.0	-0.2	-7.6	-3.3	-5.0
Shannon	-13.8	-6.8	-6.4	-6.5	-6.1	-9.7	-7.1	-7.3	-5.5	-0.9	-5.7	-6.5	-3.0	-4.3
Wayne	-14.4	-7.6	-9.2	-6.3	-4.1	-9.1						-8.6	-1.1	-2.4
Daina	-8.7	-3.7	-3.7	-0.4	-5.0	-2.2	-2.9					-3.0	+2.4	-0.2
Phil	-11.8	-5.8	-6.0	-3.6	-7.0	-14.7	-3.9	+4.9	-7.8	-1.0	-1.2	-4.7	+1.2	+7.5
David	-16.6	-7.5	-7.5	-4.8	-6.3	-7.1	-2.5	-5.5	-4.3	+0.1	-8.2	+1.9	+1.9	
Phoebe	-7.1	-4.3	-3.4	-3.8	-3.9	-5.7	-2.8	-2.5	-2.2	-0.8	-1.5	-1.1		
Rick	-14.8	-8.2	-6.7	-5.5	-4.4	-10.7	-5.7	-5.5	+0.5	-14.4				
Caitlin	-15.2	-5.6	-5.1	-2.9	-7.3	-6.4	-5.4	-4.6	-2.1					
Jarna	-8.5	-3.4	-3.6	-3.6	-2.7	-6.5	-4.2	-10.8						
Chris	-8.4	-3.9	-4.4	-5.0	-4.0	+1.0								
Elise	-7.0	-4.6	-2.9	-2.4	-21.0									
Teneale	-9.0	-3.8	-3.5	-2.4	-19.9									
Jenni	-8.2	-5.4	-3.7	-29.0										
Geoff	-14.0	-29.8												
Allan	-8.1	-16.2												
Romi	-5.3	-8.2												

=== Weight Loss Percentage History ===
Contestant	Week													Finale
Contestant	1	2	3	4	5	6	7	8	9	10	11	12	13	Finale
Lisa	-7.14%	-4.24%	-3.78%	-3.84%	-4.29%	-6.46%	-5.68%	-3.78%	-3.56%	-1.78%	-3.63%	-4.57%	-0.14%	-7.33%
Joe	-6.84%	-3.82%	-4.16%	-3.75%	-4.57%	-6.55%	-4.60%	-3.16%	-5.88%	-1.73%	-0.18%	-6.70%	-3.13%	-4.89%
Shannon	-6.44%	-3.39%	-3.30%	-3.47%	-3.37%	-5.55%	-4.30%	-4.62%	-3.65%	-0.62%	-3.95%	-4.69%	-2.27%	-3.33%
Wayne	-8.92%	-5.17%	-6.59%	-4.83%	-3.31%	-7.59%						-7.76%	-1.08%	-2.37%
Daina	-8.27%	-3.83%	-3.99%	-0.45%	-5.64%	-2.63%	-3.56%					-3.82%	+3.17%	-0.26%
Phil	-8.03%	-4.29%	-4.64%	-2.92%	-5.85%	-13.04%	-3.98%	+5.21%	-7.88%	-1.10%	-1.33%	-5.26%	-1.42%	+8.77%
David	-10.02%	-5.03%	-5.30%	-3.58%	-4.88%	-5.78%	-2.16%	-4.85%	-3.99%	+0.10%	-7.92%	+1.99%	+1.95%	
Phoebe	-6.12%	-3.95%	-3.25%	-3.75%	-4.00%	-6.10%	-3.19%	-2.94%	-2.67%	-1.00%	-1.89%	-1.41%		
Rick	-8.57%	-5.20%	-4.48%	-3.85%	-3.20%	-8.05%	-4.66%	-4.72%	+0.45%	-12.90%				
Caitlin	-8.47%	-3.41%	-3.22%	-1.89%	-4.85%	-4.47%	-3.94%	-3.50%	-1.65%					
Jarna	-7.15%	-3.08%	-3.37%	-3.48%	-2.71%	-6.70%	-4.64%	-12.51%						
Chris	-6.52%	-3.24%	-3.77%	-4.46%	-3.73%	+0.97%								
Elise	-6.69%	-4.71%	-3.12%	-2.66%	-23.95%									
Teneale	-9.24%	-4.30%	-4.14%	-2.96%	-25.29%									
Jenni	-6.28%	-4.41%	-3.16%	-25.60%										
Geoff	-8.66%	-20.19%												
Allan	-5.20%	-10.97%												
Romi	-5.34%	-8.72%												

== Contestants ==
There are 18 contestants in this season, competing as nine teams of two. There were originally 20 contestants, but with the arrest of a contestant, the number was dropped to 18. Although the 10th pair participated in the competition, the episodes featuring them were heavily re-edited prior to airing to exclude them entirely.

In Week 6, the remaining contestants were given black T-shirts, and were told that they were all competing as singles now.

"Singles Team 1" refers to the black team when the contestants first started competing as individuals in week 6.

"Singles Team 2" refers to the teams after Phil and Joe left to become the white team training with The Commando in week 8.

"Singles Team 3" refers to the teams after Wayne and Daina re-entered the competition as a result of the marathon in week 12.

"Singles Team 4" refers to the black team after Joe returned to Camp Biggest Loser by winning the weigh-in against Phil after training with The Commando in the Northern Territory for 5 weeks.

Members	Teammate	Couples Team	Singles Team 1	Singles Team 2	Singles Team 3	Singles Team 4	Status	Votes when Eliminated
Allan Cook	Romi	Orange Team					Eliminated Week 1	4
Romi Cook	Allan	Orange Team					Eliminated Week 1	4
Geoff Ibbs	Wayne	Red Team					Left Week 3	0
Jenni Noble	Phoebe	Brown Team					Eliminated Week 3	3
Elise Cameron	Teneale	Pink Team					Eliminated Week 4	3
Teneale Cameron	Elise	Pink Team					Eliminated Week 4	3
Wayne Bettany, Returned Week 12	Geoff, Phoebe	Red Team					Eliminated Week 5	1
Chris Galea	Shannon	Blue Team	Black Team				Left Week 6	0
Daina Bottrell, Returned Week 12	Caitlin	Yellow Team					Eliminated Week 6	4
Jarna Craig	Lisa	Purple Team					Eliminated Week 7	3
Caitlin Bottrell	Daina	Yellow Team	Black Team				Eliminated Week 8	2
Rick Medway	Joe	Green Team	Black Team				Eliminated Week 9	2
Phoebe Noble	Jenni, Wayne	Brown Team	Black Team				Eliminated Week 11	1
Phoebe Noble	Jenni, Wayne	Red Team	Black Team				Eliminated Week 11	1
David Dobbie	Phil	Grey Team	Black Team	Black Team			Eliminated Week 12	2
Phil Green	David	Grey Team	White Team	White Team			Eliminated Week 13 - After Training with The Commando	0
Daina Bottrell	Caitlin	Yellow Team	None	Black Team	Black Team		Re-eliminated Week 13	2
Wayne Bettany	Geoff, Phoebe	Red Team	None	Black Team	Black Team	None	4th Place	N/A
Shannon Bourke	Chris	Blue Team	Black Team	Black Team	Black Team	Black Team	3rd Place	N/A
Joe Medway	Rick	Green Team	Black Team	White Team	Black Team	White Team	2nd Place	N/A
Lisa Hose	Jarna	Purple Team	Black Team	Black Team	Black Team	Black Team	Winner	N/A

== Game elements ==
The episodes and elements of the show are screened on a weekly rotation, generally in the following set up:

- Tuesday: Challenge (sometimes Temptation)
- Wednesday: Family Reveal
- Thursday: Challenge (sometimes Temptation)
- Friday: Masterclass
- Sunday: Last-Chance Training and Weigh-In
- Monday: Elimination

Towards the end of the season, the elements of each day's episode vary slightly as special events occur.

[N.B. In numbering the weeks on this page, Elimination is considered to mark the end of each week. Due to heavy re-editing, Week 1 aired entirely in Episode 1 (Sunday 31 January 2010), and Week 2 aired entirely in Episode 2 (Monday 1 February 2010). Week 3 started in Episode 3 (Tuesday 2 February 2010) and then proceeded as normal.]

Compared to previous years, the episodes contain less of an emphasis on gameplay and more of an emphasis on training.

In addition, this series introduces the Masterclass segment. Modeled after the similar segment from MasterChef Australia, the Masterclass educates both contestants and viewers on how to maintain a healthy lifestyle.

=== Challenges (Tuesday and Thursday) ===
Each week there are two challenges, one on Tuesday and one on Thursday. Sometimes one of the two challenges will be called "Temptation". Immunity is often a prize for winning a challenge, but other prizes are also given.

Immunity means that even if their weight loss means they would fall below the yellow line in the next weigh-in, they will not be up for elimination and the next couple or contestant with the lowest percentage of weight loss will take their place under the yellow line. Immunity is revoked if the holder of immunity records a weight gain at the weigh-in. Additionally, if a contestant records a weight gain at the weigh-in, they are ineligible to compete for immunity in the following week.

Temptation is symbolic of the fact that foods offered in Temptation may be foods that tempt the contestants in the outside world and some contestants restrain from Temptation for the fact that they want to steer away from these foods for good. To win immunity during Temptation, an element of risk is involved as couples or contestants may have to eat high-calorie or unhealthy foods for a chance to win immunity and this could jeopardise their performance in the next weigh-in.

N.B. Weeks 1 and 2 were each condensed into a single episode, airing on Sunday 31 January 2010 and Monday 1 February 2010 respectively. However, the challenges of those two weeks are listed as Tuesday and Thursday challenges for categorisation purposes.

==== Week 1 Tuesday - Last 4 km of the marathon ====
After finding out that they will all participate in a 42 km full marathon in three months' time, the contestants ran the last 4 km of the marathon. They ran the race in couples. The results were as follows:

- 1st place: Rick & Joe (37 mins)
- 2nd place: David & Phil (38 mins)
- 3rd place: Jenni & Phoebe (41 mins)
- 4th place: Allan & Romi (42 mins)
- 5th place: Jarna & Lisa (44 mins)
- 6th place: Elise & Teneale (45 mins)
- 7th place: Caitlin & Daina (1 hour 11 mins)
- 8th place: Wayne & Geoff (1 hour 16 mins)
- 9th place: Chris & Shannon (1 hour 54 mins) [Shannon only made it to the 1 km mark, but this was a great achievement for him.]

==== Week 1 Thursday - Housewarming Gift ====
Upon moving into Camp Biggest Loser, one couple was to find an extra special housewarming gift: the Double and Nothing bracelets. This couple had the power to choose who would get each bracelet. Allan & Romi found the bracelets in their room. They chose to give the Nothing bracelet to Shannon to protect him, and chose to keep the Double bracelet for Allan as they felt they couldn't make another contestant a target by giving it to them.

==== Week 2 Tuesday - Beachside Challenge ====
At Palm Beach, the contestants competed in couples for immunity. The couple first had to dig up a rowboat that was buried in the sand beneath them. They then had to carry the boat 200m to the other side of the beach, pick up a pair of oars tied together, and untie the oars. One person from the couple then had to row 500m out to a pontoon, collect their team's flag and row back to the beach. Finally, the couple had to run the 200m back to the start and plant their flag on the finish line. Due to medical issues, Geoff and Shannon were unable to compete, so their partners Wayne and Chris opted to compete solo (rather than sit out). Rick & Joe quickly dug out a boat and were off to a good start. They ran to the other side, rowed out, got their flag and ran to the finish line all before any other team had even managed to dig up a boat. Chris couldn't find a boat and Wayne offered to work together with him. Wayne and Chris got a boat out, and took it to the other side. They agreed that Wayne would row out first to get his flag, and then Chris would row out and get his flag, and then they would finish together. Wayne retrieved his flag, but on the way back one of his oars snapped. Wayne left Chris on the beach without a functioning boat and took his flag to the finish line. David & Phil were close behind Wayne and Chris, but Phil was unable to properly steer his boat, veering further and further off course, eventually having to be rescued by a motorboat. Jarna & Lisa arrived at the rowing side of the beach and Lisa rowed to retrieve their flag. The final results were:

- 1st place: Rick & Joe
- 2nd place: Wayne
- 3rd place: Jarna & Lisa
- Did not finish: Chris, David & Phil, Caitlin & Daina, Jenni & Phoebe, Elise & Teneale

==== Week 2 Thursday - Public Speaking ====
The contestants dressed up and were taken to the Riverside Theatre. They were told that they were each going to be given 5 minutes to speak on their own in front of an audience consisting mainly of past applicants for The Biggest Loser. Many of the contestants were afraid of the task but they all overcame their fears and shared with the audience their personal journeys, struggles and dreams.

==== Week 3 Tuesday - Secret Service ====
This was the contestants' first Temptation. The prize was immunity. The contestants were seated at tables in booths, separated from each other's view by curtains. Each table had a bell. The Temptation took place over the course of several rounds. Each round, a waiter came with a dessert. The number of calories in the dessert increased each round. After Hayley said "Who's tempted?", whoever rang their bell first would have to eat the dessert. Whichever contestant had consumed the most calories after the final round would win immunity for themselves and their partner. If no one played Temptation, immunity would stay with the previous week's immunity holders, Rick & Joe. The desserts that came out and the contestants that ate them were:

- Mini-lamington (65 Cal or 270 kJ): Daina
- Chocolate-coated strawberry (100 Cal or 420 kJ): Wayne
- Strawberry cupcake (137 Cal or 570 kJ): Daina
- Slice of sticky date pudding (274 Cal or 1,150 kJ): Daina
- Caramel slice (376 Cal or 1,570 kJ): Daina
- Carrot cake (762 Cal or 3,190 kJ): Daina
- Crème brûlée (2,498 Cal or 10,450 kJ): Daina

Daina nearly couldn't finish the last dish, and if she didn't she would forfeit all the calories she had eaten, but she managed to finish eating, winning immunity for herself and Caitlin.

==== Week 3 Thursday - Commando Challenge ====
The Commando surprised the contestants in the middle of the night, waking them up at midnight. He took them to a construction area. Instead of competing against each other, every member had to work together to do certain tasks by The Commando. The first task was for them to pull a heavy construction vehicle from one end of the area to the other, working as a team. The next task was to move 40 tonnes of crushed rock from one pile to another 15m away. During the task, The Commando revealed that at the bottom of the rock pile was something they all wanted, but they had to get to it before 6am. They managed to reach it and opened a box to reveal a key. Upon returning to Camp Biggest Loser, the key opened a package containing letters from home.

==== Week 4 Tuesday - Brains and Brawn ====
As couples, one member (the Quiz Master/Brains) was to answer a series of multiple-choice questions about food, diet and exercise. The other member (the Bucket Holder/Brawn) had to hold a rope that was suspending a bucket of water in the air via a pulley. Each couple got to choose which of them would play which role. For each question answered wrong, five litres of water would be added to the couple's bucket. The winner is the last couple still holding their bucket in the air. In the end, it came down to Rick & Joe and Caitlin & Daina. When Rick & Joe's bucket contained 50 litres, it was too much for them to hold onto and as a result, Caitlin & Daina won the challenge and immunity for the week. The couples were eliminated in the following order:

- 1st out: Chris (Brawn) & Shannon (Brains) - after 7 questions, carrying 30L
- 2nd out: Elise (Brains) & Teneale (Brawn) - after 7 questions, carrying 25L
- 3rd out: Wayne (Brawn) & Phoebe (Brains) - after 8 questions, carrying 25L
- 4th out: Jarna (Brawn) & Lisa (Brains) - after 10 questions, carrying 30L
- 5th out: David (Brains) & Phil (Brawn) - after 11 questions, carrying 40L
- 6th out: Joe (Brawn) & Rick (Brains) - after 14 questions, carrying 50L
- Winners: Caitlin (Brawn) & Daina (Brains) - carrying 30L

==== Week 4 Thursday - 10 km run ====
The contestants had been training to do a 10 km run, but didn't know exactly when it would be. On the day, Shannan and Michelle surprised the contestants by saying that the day had arrived. Whoever came first would win three phone calls, either to use themselves or give to another contestant. Unlike the 4 km run, the contestants ran this race as individuals. Due to injuries, Lisa, Shannon and David were unable to run the race. The results were as follows:

- 1st place: Wayne (1 hour 11 mins 45 secs)
- 2nd place: Daina (1 hour 14 mins 59 secs)
- 3rd place: Chris (1 hour 17 mins 12 secs)
- 4th place: Phil (1 hour 17 mins 46 secs)
- 5th place: Joe (1 hour 23 mins 16 secs)
- 6th place: Rick (1 hour 24 mins 35 secs)
- 7th place: Jarna (1 hour 25 mins 17 secs)
- 8th place: Phoebe (1 hour 30 mins 26 secs)
- 9th place: Teneale (1 hour 38 mins 36 secs)
- 10th place: Elise (1 hour 40-something mins)
- 11th place: Caitlin (1 hour 55 mins 7 secs)

As the winner, Wayne won the three phone calls. He chose to give them all away: one to Shannon, one to Lisa, and one to Phil.

==== Week 5 Tuesday - Mexican Standoff ====
In this Temptation, two couples stood over a barrel with a maraca. A plate of Mexican food was placed on the barrel. Once the 60-second timer was started, whoever grabbed the maraca first had to eat the plate of food, and so did their partner. If no-one grabbed the maraca, the couple originally at the barrel won the round without having to eat the food. The winners of the round then chose the couple to challenge next. Whichever couple won the last round would win the prize of Temptation, which was the power to choose which couple would be pitted against the other five couples for the next week. As winners of the previous week's immunity challenge (Brains and Brawn), Caitlin & Daina started as the first couple at the barrel and chose their first challengers.

- Round 1: Caitlin & Daina challenged Chris & Shannon. Caitlin & Daina figured that Chris & Shannon may have been tempted, and if they took it they would have to continue eating for the rest of the rounds. The dish was a beef enchilada worth 265 calories (1,110 kJ). No-one took the maraca. Caitlin & Daina won without eating.
- Round 2: Caitlin & Daina challenged Jarna & Lisa. They wanted to challenge the non-Firm members first. The dish was a chicken burrito worth 432 calories (1,810 kJ). No-one took the maraca. Caitlin & Daina won without eating.
- Round 3: Caitlin & Daina challenged David & Phil. The dish was five chilli chocolates worth 569 calories (2,380 kJ). No-one took the maraca. Caitlin & Daina won without eating.
- Round 4: Caitlin & Daina challenged Rick & Joe. The dish was nachos worth 745 calories (3,120 kJ). No-one took the maraca. Caitlin & Daina won without eating.
- Round 5: Caitlin & Daina challenged Wayne & Phoebe. The dish was a capirotada worth 1,265 calories (5,290 kJ). Despite being a part of the Firm alliance, Wayne surprised Caitlin & Daina by taking the maraca, forcing himself and Phoebe to eat the food on the plate. they each had a plate of capirotada to eat. Wayne finished it, but Phoebe wasn't able to finish hers, and as a result, Wayne and Phoebe didn't win the round.

Caitlin and Daina won Temptation without eating anything and decided they would be the couple to face off against the other five couples. For the remainder of the week, it was "all vs one" where Caitlin and Daina's percentage weight loss had to be greater than the other five couples' average percentage weight loss to win the weigh-in. Caitlin & Daina chose their trainer for the week and picked Michelle, leaving the others with Shannan. Should Caitlin and Daina win the weigh-in, they will decide which of the other contestants to eliminate. Otherwise, the five couples will decide who between Caitlin or Daina will be eliminated.

==== Week 5 Thursday - Mini-Carnival ====
The challenge this week was one couple vs. five - Caitlin & Daina vs. the rest, due to the results of Temptation. They were playing for a 2 kg weight advantage at the next weigh-in, which would also be Caitlin & Daina vs. the rest (according to average percentage weight loss). The challenge consisted of five events in a mini-carnival format, testing their knowledge, agility, speed, strength and stamina. As the lone couple, Caitlin & Daina chose which of them would compete, and which of the other contestants they would compete against. For each event, they had to choose a competitor from a different couple. The first team to win three out of the five events would win the challenge.

- Event 1 - Speed: Daina competed against Jarna. The event was a 100 m sprint. Daina won.
- Event 2 - Strength: Caitlin competed against Phoebe. The event was a tug of war. The competitors stood on platforms holding a rope between them. Each competitor had to pull the other off their platform. The event was best out of three, so the first to win two rounds would win the event. Caitlin won two rounds back-to-back by getting Phoebe off-balance and then loosening the rope, making Phoebe fall off her platform.
- Event 3 - Agility: Daina competed against Phil. The competitors stood inside a circle with a rotating beam machine. The machine had two beams sticking out from it, one at about shoulder height and the other at shin height. The machine rotated the beams clockwise, starting slowly but increasing in speed over time. The competitors had to duck under and jump over the beams as they passed, without stepping out of the circle. A competitor would lose a round if they broke one of the beams or stepped outside of the circle. After one competitor lost three times, the other would be the winner. Phil broke one beam by stepping on it. In the second round, Daina clipped a beam without breaking it, but Phil thought Daina had broken it and so stepped out of the circle, losing the round. In the third round, Phil again stepped on a beam and broke it, so Daina won the event.

There was no need to run the last two events, as Caitlin & Daina had already won three events out of the five. Caitlin & Daina won the 2 kg advantage at the next weigh-in.

==== Week 6 Tuesday - Survival of the Fittest ====
In this challenge, the contestants had to navigate a mud obstacle course to reach a pile of car tyres. They could then collect one or two tyres to carry back through the obstacle course and place on poles assigned to their rivals. They could then go back and continue to fetch tyres. Once a contestant's poles carried 30 tyres (10 tyres on each of 3 poles), they were eliminated from the challenge. The last competitor remaining won the challenge and the prize of immunity. Shannon and David were unable to compete due to injury. The contestants were eliminated in the following order: Chris (30 tyres), Lisa (retired due to back injury), Daina (retired due to thumb injury), Caitlin (retired due to ankle injury), Joe (30 tyres), Jarna (30 tyres), Phoebe (30 tyres), Rick (30 tyres). After 4 hours, Phil was the last contestant remaining and won immunity.

==== Week 6 Thursday - Everyone Has Their Price ====
The contestants were given a Temptation to leave the game (including forfeiting participation in the second-chance marathon) for a certain amount of money (to be taken out of the amount set aside for the winner of the competition). The money was offered to each contestant one after the other, in increasing order of the contestants' total percentage of weigh-loss at that time since the beginning of the game. Jarna (who had the lowest total percentage of weight-loss) was offered $1,000, which she declined. The money was increased to $5,000 and offered to Shannon, which he also declined. The money was then offered to Phoebe and again increased, this time to $10,000; she also declined. The money was then offered to Chris and increased to $15,000. He accepted the money stating he can now get his life back on track after money problems due to him losing his job. Chris now has no way of returning to the game, as he will not be allowed to compete in the marathon.

==== Week 7 Tuesday - Wheel of Temptation ====
Temptation consisted of several rounds of spinning one of three wheels to win a prize. The most important prize on the wheels was immunity, and along with immunity the winner would receive power to pair off the other eight contestants to go head-to-head for the rest of the week. This would culminate at the weigh-in, where the contestant from each pair with the lower percentage weight loss would be below the yellow line (so there would be four contestants below the yellow line). Apart from immunity, there were other prizes on the wheels worth a total of $50,000. To obtain a spin of a wheel, the contestant would have to eat a chocolate item, with the number of calories getting greater as chances of winning increased. The order of contestants being offered a spin was determined by numbered discs the contestants were standing on.

- 1st wheel: There was a 1 in 33 chance of winning immunity, and a 10 in 33 chance of winning another prize (10 prizes with a combined value of over $5,000). The admission fee for a spin of this wheel was to eat a small chocolate worth 77 calories (320 kJ).
  1. Shannon: Declined to play.
  2. Joe: Played. Won nothing.
  3. Jarna: Played. Won nothing.
  4. Phil: Played. Won nothing.
  5. Phoebe: Declined to play.
  6. Rick: Played. Won nothing.
  7. Caitlin: Played. Won nothing.
  8. Lisa: Declined to play.
  9. David: Played. Won an Avanti dumbbell package worth $199.
- 2nd wheel: There was a 1 in 16 chance of winning immunity, and a 7 in 16 chance of winning another prize ( prizes with a combined value of over $30,000). The admission fee for a spin of this wheel was to eat five profiteroles worth 500 calories (2,100 kJ).
  1. Shannon: Declined to play.
  2. Joe: Declined to play.
  3. Jarna: Declined to play.
  4. Phil: Played. Won nothing.
  5. Phoebe: Declined to play.
  6. Rick: Played. Won nothing.
  7. Caitlin: Declined to play.
  8. Lisa: Declined to play.
  9. David: Played. Won a 3-night adventure package for two people with flights and accommodation to Queenstown, New Zealand.
- 3rd wheel: There was a 1 in 4 chance of winning immunity, and a 1 in 2 chance of winning another prize (the two prizes were an 8-day tour of China for two people including airfares worth over $7,000 and two VIP tickets to the Australian Formula 1 Grand Prix including flights and accommodation worth $8,000). The admission fee for a spin of this wheel was to eat a chocolate mousse worth 1,000 calories (4,200 kJ).
  1. Shannon: Declined to play.
  2. Joe: Declined to play.
  3. Jarna: Declined to play.
  4. Phil: Played. Won the tour of China.
  5. Phoebe: Declined to play.
  6. Rick: Played. Won nothing.
  7. Caitlin: Declined to play.
  8. Lisa: Declined to play.
  9. David: Played. Won nothing.
- Final round: Since immunity had not been won in the first three rounds, contestants were offered another spin on the third wheel at the cost of eating another chocolate mousse (1,000 calories or 4,200 kilojoules). As the China tour prize had been won, its slot was replaced by a free spin. This time, the order of offers was determined by Hayley pulling names out of a bag.
  1. Shannon: Declined to play.
  2. David: Played. Won immunity.

As the winner of immunity, David paired off the other contestants to go head-to-head at the next weigh-in: Lisa and Jarna, Shannon and Phoebe, Joe and Phil, Caitlin and Rick.

==== Week 7 Thursday - Head to Head ====
The contestants were taken to the State Sports Centre at Sydney Olympic Park for this week's challenge. Following on from the week's theme of pitting pairs of contestants against each other in a head-to-head battle, the challenge involved the head-to-head pairs competing in exercise activities. The four losers of the activity challenges would be denied access to the gym, equipment and trainers for the rest of the week until the weigh-in. As the holder of immunity, David did not have to compete.

1. Shannon vs. Phoebe (10-minute gym cardio): Whoever did the most reps in 10 minutes won the challenge. Shannon did 656 reps, defeating Phoebe who did 589 reps.
2. Rick vs. Caitlin (spin bikes): Whoever clocked the higher number of kilometres in 10 minutes won the challenge. Rick clocked 8.6 km, defeating Caitlin at 7.4 km.
3. Phil vs. Joe (treadmills): The contestants ran on the treadmills, starting at 5 km/h and increasing their speed by 1 km/h at every minute mark. Whoever lasted the longest won the challenge. Joe forfeited when they were running at 14 km/h (after the 9-minute mark), making Phil the winner.
4. Lisa vs. Jarna (rowing machines): The contestant that rowed 2.5 km first won. Lisa defeated Jarna.

As a result, Phoebe, Caitlin, Joe and Jarna lost access to the gym, equipment and trainers for Last-Chance Training.

==== Week 8 Tuesday - Balance and Concentration ====
In this challenge, the contestants all stood on a long platform made up of seven poles positioned in the middle of a swimming pool. Poles were stripped away from the platform one after the other at random times, making the platform narrower and narrower as time went on. Whichever contestant was the last one still standing on the platform would win immunity. Rick and Joe tried to unsettle the other contestants by wobbling the platform, and there was trash talking between the contestants trying to get each other to lose balance. At 20 minutes in and after three of the seven poles had fallen, Phil lost his balance due to Rick's wobbling and fell off. Shortly afterwards, Lisa lost her balance too. She grabbed Rick to try to stabilise herself but Rick fell and grabbed Lisa to take her with him. At 42 minutes in, another pole fell, the remaining contestants tried to shake each other off, and David fell. At 1 hour 33 minutes in, Shannon lost his balance and fell off. This sent a shockwave through the platform, causing Caitlin to lose her balance and fall off. Caitlin's fall in turn made Joe lose his balance and fall, leaving Phoebe as the last one standing and the winner of immunity.

==== Week 8 Wednesday - Half-Marathon ====
This challenge was aired on a Wednesday instead of a Thursday. The day of the 21 km half-marathon arrived, and the contestants were taken to a national park for the race. Hayley said that the winner of the race would be presented with a unique opportunity, but did not say what it was. David was unable to run the race at all due to medical conditions. Shannon was only able to run 200m, Lisa was only able to go for half an hour, and Rick was only able to run 7 km and then walk the rest of the way. The results were as follows:

- 1st place: Phil (2 hours 24 mins 18 secs)
- 2nd place: Joe (2 hours 35 mins 20 secs)
- 3rd place: Rick (2 hours 56 mins 56 secs)
- 4th place: Phoebe (3 hour 15 mins 42 secs)
- 5th place: Caitlin (4 hour 16 mins 4 secs)

Lisa was able to cover close to 3 km in the half an hour she was able to race. As the winner, Phil was to be presented with a unique opportunity. It was to be a challenge of sorts, but before he was told what the opportunity was, Phil had to choose another contestant to confront the challenge with him. Phil chose to take Joe with him. It was then revealed that the two of them would be taken by The Commando to train for the next five weeks in a secret location. Whichever of the two of them had lost the higher total percentage weight loss since week 1 would return to the competition as one of the final 4. The following episode (Thursday) focused on Phil and Joe's first day of training with The Commando in the Northern Territory.

==== Week 9 Tuesday ====
There was no challenge on this day as the episode instead focused on the contestants receiving total body makeovers from Joh Bailey.

==== Week 9 Thursday - Food Heaven ====
In this week's Temptation, the contestants each had a turn in a room filled with all kinds of different foods, each labelled with the number of calories in them. Each contestant could eat as much food as they wanted, and did not know how much the other contestants ate. Whichever contestant ate the highest number of calories would win immunity, or if none of the contestants ate, immunity would remain with Phoebe, the holder of immunity from the previous week. The contestants went into the room in the following order:

1. Phoebe: Ate chocolates (98 Cal or 410 kJ), lollies (70 Cal or 290 kJ), strawberries and cream (106 Cal or 440 kJ), and more chocolates (98 Cal or 410 kJ), for a total of 372 calories (1,560 kJ).
2. David: Did not eat anything.
3. Lisa: Did not eat anything.
4. Rick: Ate a sausage roll (517 Cal or 2,160 kJ), hot chips (392 Cal or 1,640 kJ), a hamburger (545 Cal or 2,280 kJ), tomato sauce (14 Cal or 59 kJ), cola (129 Cal or 540 kJ), a doughnut (305 Cal or 1,280 kJ), a lamington (244 Cal or 1,020 kJ), a creaming soda (100 Cal or 420 kJ), and another hamburger (545 Cal or 2,280 kJ), for a total of 2,791 calories (11,680 kJ).
5. Shannon: Did not eat anything.

Rick won immunity, having consumed 2,791 calories (11,680 kJ).

==== Week 10 Tuesday - Abseiling ====
For their first challenge in New Zealand, the contestants had to abseil down Kitekite Falls, drops of 18, 4 and 48 metres (totalling 70 metres). They were led by Shannan and Michelle and encouraged to leave their old selves at the top of the falls and embrace their new life at the bottom of the falls.

==== Week 10 Wednesday - Personal Challenge ====
The contestants were in New Zealand, and there was an extra challenge for the contestants this week. Aboard the R. Tucker Thompson in the Bay of Islands, each contestant was set a personal challenge by Shannan and Michelle to face their deepest fears. Michelle challenged Phoebe and Lisa to climb to the top of the rigging, then climb halfway down and jump over the side of the ship. Shannan challenged David and Shannon to swim underneath the ship from one side to the other.

==== Week 10 Thursday - Treasure Hunt ====
The contestants were set another challenge by Shannan and Michelle. At the end of the challenge was a treasure that they had 30 minutes to find in order to receive it. Starting on a beach, each contestant swam out to a kayak, dove down to unclip it from its anchor, and then climbed in and paddled 400m to the beach on the other side of the water. There they found a tiki with their name on it, indicating the location at which they were to dig to find their treasure. David found his treasure chest first after 15 minutes, then Lisa found hers after 19 minutes, Phoebe found hers after 24 minutes and Shannon found his after 27 minutes. The treasure chests contained items from home for each of the contestants. David's chest contained his karate black belt (with extension), a charm from his wife's charm bracelet that he gave to her, a card from his two children, and some family photos. Lisa's chest contained a card from her daughter Chelsea, and a shirt belonging to her husband Campbell. Phoebe's chest contained some photos, and a letter from her mum. Shannon's chest contained a gold chain that he used to wear but stopped wearing because it didn't fit his neck, his old football jersey that he hadn't worn since he was 17, and a letter from his fiancée Sarah.

==== Week 11 Wednesday - Flag Raising ====
This challenge was aired on a Wednesday instead of a Tuesday, as the Tuesday episode instead focused on the contestants viewing a video of Phil and Joe training with The Commando in the Northern Territory. The prize in this challenge was immunity, but David was ineligible to compete as he had gained weight at the previous weigh-in. In this challenge, each contestant had to retrieve a winch handle from a flag pole, and then use it to raise the flag poles belonging to their opponents. Each contestant had 5 flag poles, and if all 5 of their flags were raised, they were out of the challenge. The last contestant remaining would win immunity. Flags were raised in the following order:

1. Shannon raised Lisa's 1st flag.
2. Phoebe raised Shannon's 1st flag.
3. Lisa raised Shannon's 2nd flag.
4. Phoebe raised Shannon's 3rd flag.
5. Shannon raised Lisa's 2nd flag.
6. Lisa raised Phoebe's 1st flag.
7. Shannon raised Lisa's 3rd flag.
8. Phoebe raised Lisa's 4th flag.
9. Shannon raised Phoebe's 2nd flag.
10. Lisa raised Phoebe's 3rd flag.
11. Phoebe raised Shannon's 4th flag.
12. Shannon raised Phoebe's 4th flag.
13. Lisa raised Phoebe's 5th flag. (Phoebe was eliminated while raising Lisa's 5th flag.)
14. Shannon raised Lisa's 5th flag (partially raised by Phoebe). (Lisa was eliminated while raising Shannon's 5th flag.)

Shannon won immunity with 4 flags raised.

==== Week 11 Thursday - Rochelle Gilmore's Spin Bike Challenge ====
In a special training session with cyclist Rochelle Gilmore, the contestants were challenged on their spin bikes. Each spin bike was hooked up to a car's headlights, with the headlights being turned on when the contestant cycled above a settable RPM level. At the end of the spin training session, Rochelle set a challenge for the contestants to maintain 130 rpm for 4 minutes. All four contestants hit 130 rpm. Lisa dropped out first, followed by Shannon. Phoebe and David were still going after 3 minutes, at which point Shannan raised the bar to 140 rpm for the last minute, which both Phoebe and David met. With 30 seconds remaining, Shannan raised the bar again to 150 rpm. David was able to reach 150 rpm, but Phoebe was not. David was able to last the set time and won the challenge. There was no prize for the challenge.

==== Week 12 Wednesday - Northern Territory Marathon ====
Tuesday's episode focused on the eliminated contestants returning to Camp Biggest Loser in preparation for the marathon. In the Wednesday episode, Phil and Joe undertook their own 42 km marathon in the Northern Territory, starting at 2am. For each of them that finished the race, $10,000 was donated by Vodafone Foundation to Red Dust Role Models. Phil finished first in 5 hours and 6 minutes. Joe finished in 6 hours and 17 minutes. As both of them made the distance, $20,000 was donated to Red Dust Role Models.

==== Week 12 Wednesday-Thursday - Eliminated Contestants' Marathon ====
All the eliminated contestants (except for Geoff and Chris) took part in the 42 km marathon, having trained for it for the past 11 weeks. Lisa and David were unable to participate due to injuries, but Shannon was allowed to walk 10 km. The first male and first female eliminated contestants to finish the race would return to the competition. The results were as follows:

- 1st place: Wayne (1st male, 5 hours 20 mins 35 secs)
- 2nd place: Daina (1st female, 5 hours 28 mins 31 secs)
- 3rd place: Teneale (2nd female, 5 hours 56 mins 2 secs)
- Equal 4th place: Jarna (3rd female, 6 hours 5 mins 11 secs)
- Equal 4th place: Rick (2nd male, 6 hours 5 mins 11 secs)
- 6th place: Phoebe (4th female, 6 hours 43 mins 19 secs)
- 7th place: Elise (5th female, 7 hours 5 mins 4 secs)
- Equal 8th place: Jenni (6th female, 7 hours 7 mins 13 secs)
- Equal 8th place: Allan (3rd male, 7 hours 7 mins 13 secs)
- 10th place: Caitlin (7th female, 8 hours 4 mins 50 secs)
- Did not finish: Romi (retired after 23 km)

Shannon completed the 10 km he was allowed to walk. Wayne and Daina received black T-shirts and returned to the competition.

==== Week 13 Monday - Filling Cars with Apples ====
Instead of having a special guest trainer following Elimination, the contestants were set a challenge by Shannan and Michelle as a training session. The contestants were taken to Barangaroo, where they each had to carry a total of 3 cubic metres of apples using a wheelbarrow, buckets or sandbags and fill a small car with the apples. Lisa was not allowed to carry heavy loads, so her car was moved closer to the apples than the other contestants', and Shannon was not allowed to run. Wayne and Shannon took the lead at first. Shannon overtook Wayne but Lisa caught up to them. Lisa and Shannon took the lead, and Lisa ended up finishing first.

==== Week 13 Tuesday - Super Challenge ====
The contestants were taken to Katoomba for a super challenge. The winner of the super challenge would win the power to move one of the bracelets, potentially to themselves or away from themselves. In addition, the winner would win 5 nights for two at The Golden Door retreat in the Hunter Valley and $5,000 cash. The challenge consisted of two parts. In the first part, the four contestants were split up into two teams (allocated randomly by drawing coloured stones from a bag). Lisa and Shannon drew blue stones, so they were a team, and Daina and Wayne drew red stones, so they were the other team. For the first part of the challenge, one member from each team had to climb down a ladder hanging from the Scenic World Skyway, a cable car suspended 1,000 feet (300 m) above the ground, and retrieve a flag at the bottom of the ladder. The other team member had to support their teammate by rope from the cable car. The team that retrieved their flag first won the first part of the challenge and the chance to compete against each other in the second part of the challenge. Shannon was chosen to climb down the ladder as Lisa was unable to do so due to her foot injury, and Daina chose to climb down as Wayne had a fear of heights. Daina retrieved her flag first, so she and Wayne competed in the second part of the challenge. For the second part of the challenge, the contestants were taken to a table with 8 different foods: a tin of baked beans, 1 large hamburger bun, 50g of potato crisps, 1 Mars bar, 250 mL of full fat milk, small fries, a can of Coca-Cola, and a slice of cheese. In the best of three rounds, each contestant (Wayne and Daina) had to choose a different food, and whoever chose the food with the lower number of calories won the round. Wayne and Daina took turns being first to choose a food in a round. To choose who would choose first in the first round, they drew stones from a bag. Daina drew a stone without an X on it, so Wayne was allowed first choice in the first round.

- 1st round: Wayne went first and chose the slice of cheese (84 calories). Daina chose the tin of baked beans (112 calories). Wayne won the round.
- 2nd round: Daina went first and chose the potato crisps (255 calories). Wayne chose the milk (158 calories). Wayne won the round.

Wayne had won two rounds, so there was no need for a third round. Wayne won the super challenge, including the prizes of the holiday, the cash, and the power to move one of the bracelets. He chose to leave Lisa with her Double bracelet, and instead relieve Daina of the Nothing bracelet (giving it to Shannon) as reward for winning the first part of the challenge.

==== Week 13 Wednesday - Hanging In There ====
In the Northern Territory, The Commando set a challenge for Phil and Joe to hold onto vines of a banyan tree with their legs in an L-shaped sitting position, facing each other, until one of them dropped. It was a face-off between the two as they would soon be competing against each other for a spot back at Camp Biggest Loser. Phil dropped first, so Joe won the challenge.

==== Week 13 Thursday - Whitewater Rafting Team Challenge ====
The contestants were taken to the Penrith Whitewater rafting centre, where they took on the Olympic-grade course in two rafts. Lisa was unable to participate due to her injuries. There was a girls' raft (Daina, Michelle, and two female instructors) and a boys' raft (Shannon, Wayne, Shannan and a male instructor). After a couple of practice runs, the two rafts raced. Although the boys took the lead early, they hit a rock and spun around, allowing the girls to overtake them and win the race.

==== Week 13 Thursday - Whitewater Rafting Solo Challenge ====
After racing in team rafts, the three contestants took to the course individually in kayaks, with one instructor each to guide them. Shannon took the lead early but was thrown into a wall and capsized. Wayne overtook him but then Daina overtook Wayne. Daina won the race.

==== Summary ====
Week	Day	Title	Challenge or Temptation	Prize	Winner(s)	Calories consumed
1	Tuesday	Last 4 km of the marathon	Challenge	N/A	Rick and Joe	N/A
1	Thursday	Housewarming Gift	Challenge	Power to allocate the Double and Nothing bracelets	Allan & Romi	N/A
2	Tuesday	Beachside Challenge	Challenge	Immunity	Rick and Joe	N/A
2	Thursday	Public Speaking	Challenge	N/A	N/A	N/A
3	Tuesday	Secret Service	Temptation	Immunity	Caitlin & Daina	4112 cal (Daina), 0 cal (Caitlin)
3	Thursday	Commando Challenge	Challenge	Letters from home	All contestants	N/A
4	Tuesday	Brains and Brawn	Challenge	Immunity	Caitlin & Daina	N/A
4	Thursday	10 km Run	Challenge	3 phone calls	Wayne	N/A
5	Tuesday	Mexican Standoff	Temptation	Power to choose the couple pitted against the other five couples for the week	Caitlin & Daina	0 cal
5	Thursday	Mini-Carnival	Challenge	2 kg advantage at the next weigh-in	Caitlin & Daina	N/A
6	Tuesday	Survival of the Fittest	Challenge	Immunity	Phil	N/A
6	Thursday	Everyone Has Their Price	Temptation	Money, but at the cost of leaving the game without chance of return	Chris ($15,000)	N/A
7	Tuesday	Wheel of Temptation	Temptation	Immunity and power to pair off the other contestants to go head-to-head, plus other prizes worth a total of $50,000	David (Immunity and the power, Queenstown adventure package, dumbbell package)	2577 cal
7	Tuesday	Wheel of Temptation	Temptation	Immunity and power to pair off the other contestants to go head-to-head, plus other prizes worth a total of $50,000	Phil (China tour)	1577 cal
7	Thursday	Head to Head	Challenge	Continued access to gym, equipment and trainers	Shannon	N/A
7	Thursday	Head to Head	Challenge	Continued access to gym, equipment and trainers	Rick	N/A
7	Thursday	Head to Head	Challenge	Continued access to gym, equipment and trainers	Phil	N/A
7	Thursday	Head to Head	Challenge	Continued access to gym, equipment and trainers	Lisa	N/A
8	Tuesday	Balance and Concentration	Challenge	Immunity	Phoebe	N/A
8	Wednesday	Half-Marathon	Challenge	Training with the Commando	Phil	N/A
9	Thursday	Food Heaven	Temptation	Immunity	Rick	2791 cal
10	Tuesday	Abseiling	Challenge	N/A	N/A	N/A
10	Wednesday	Personal Challenge	Challenge	N/A	N/A	N/A
10	Thursday	Treasure Hunt	Challenge	Items from home	David	N/A
10	Thursday	Treasure Hunt	Challenge	Items from home	Lisa	N/A
10	Thursday	Treasure Hunt	Challenge	Items from home	Phoebe	N/A
10	Thursday	Treasure Hunt	Challenge	Items from home	Shannon	N/A
11	Wednesday	Flag Raising	Challenge	Immunity	Shannon	N/A
11	Thursday	Rochelle Gilmore's Spin Bike Challenge	Challenge	N/A	David	N/A
12	Wednesday	Northern Territory Marathon	Challenge	$10,000 donated to Red Dust Role Models by Vodafone Foundation for each contestant finishing the race	Phil (1st), Joe (2nd)	N/A
12	Wednesday-Thursday	Eliminated Contestants' Marathon	Challenge	Returning to the competition	Wayne (1st male), Daina (1st female)	N/A
13	Monday	Filling Cars with Apples	Challenge	N/A	Lisa	N/A
13	Tuesday	Super Challenge	Challenge	Power to move one of the bracelets, 5 nights for two at The Golden Door retreat in the Hunter Valley, and $5,000 cash	Wayne	N/A
13	Wednesday	Hanging In There	Challenge	N/A	Joe	N/A
13	Thursday	Whitewater Rafting Team Challenge	Challenge	N/A	Daina	N/A
13	Thursday	Whitewater Rafting Solo Challenge	Challenge	N/A	Daina	N/A

=== Family Reveal ===
The week's biggest loser is rewarded with a visit from their family and an opportunity to spend the day with them. If a contestant has already been the week's biggest loser and received a family visit, that contestant has the choice of selecting another contestant to receive a family visit instead.

- Week 1: There was no Family Reveal this week.
- Week 2: Although David was the biggest loser in the previous week, no Family Reveal was aired (possibly due to heavy re-editing of the first two weeks' episodes).
- Week 3: Rick was the biggest loser in the previous week, and was rewarded with a visit from his girlfriend Melissa, who revealed to everyone (Rick already knew) that they were having a baby.
- Week 4: Wayne was the biggest loser in the previous week, and was rewarded with a visit from his wife Carolyn, daughter Sienna, and sons Nick and Ben.
- Week 5: Wayne was the biggest loser again for the previous week, and gave his reward away to Phil, who received a visit from his daughter Memphis, son Maverick, and wife Karen.
- Week 6: Phil was the biggest loser in the previous week, but as he had already received a visit from his family, he gave it away to Joe, who received a visit from his girlfriend Lucy. However, Phil also received a reward: a visit from Hazem El Masri of the Bulldogs NRL team, Phil's favourite team.
- Week 7: Phil was the biggest loser again for the previous week, and gave his reward away to Lisa, who received a visit from her daughters Chelsea and Tegan, and husband Campbell.
- Week 8: Lisa was the biggest loser in the previous week, but there was no Family Reveal as the Wednesday episode instead focused on the 21 km half-marathon (see Challenges section for details).
- Week 9: David was the biggest loser in the previous week. There was no Family Reveal, but all the contestants received a visit from a family member in the Wednesday episode after their total body makeovers.
- Week 10: David was the biggest loser in the previous week, but there was no Family Reveal as the Wednesday episode instead focused on the contestants undergoing personal challenges in New Zealand. See Challenges section for details.
- Week 11: Lisa was the biggest loser in the previous week, but there was no Family Reveal as the Wednesday episode instead focused on a challenge. See Challenges section for details.
- Week 12: David was the biggest loser in the previous week. There was no Family Reveal as the Wednesday episode instead focused on the 42 km full marathon (see Challenges section for details), but Shannon received a visit from his fiancée Sarah after walking the 10 km he was allowed, and Wayne received a visit from his original teammate Geoff. Furthermore, in the Thursday episode, which showed the conclusion of the marathon, the competing contestants were cheered on by their families at the half-way mark and at the finish line.
- Week 13: Wayne was the biggest loser in the previous week, but there was no Family Reveal as the Wednesday episode instead focused on the contestants trying on their dream outfits.

=== Masterclass ===
A new feature for this season of The Biggest Loser, Masterclass is a time for the contestants to step away from the competition and focus on learning skills and knowledge to improve their lives even after they leave Camp Biggest Loser. The episode contains a segment by Shannan and Michelle on an aspect of physical training, a talk by Dr Norman Swan about health issues, a cooking demonstration by Janella Purcell, and a visit from a special guest. There is also a challenge, separate to the main game, in which the contestants can apply what they've learnt during Masterclass. A Masterclass Champion's Shield trophy records the contestants that won the Masterclass challenge each week.

- Week 1: No Masterclass aired this week.
- Week 2: No Masterclass aired this week.
- Week 3: Shannan and Michelle each demonstrated their top 3 stretches. Dr Swan discussed diets, indicating that it's important to think about the total package of your meal, and Mediterranean people have the best diet. Janella made Mediterranean dishes: chicken & chick pea salad, and fish & grilled vegetables. Sharif, a finalist from the previous year's The Biggest Loser competition, was the special guest, sharing his story and giving some advice to the contestants. The challenge was to burn as many calories as possible in ten minutes. Shannan and Michelle gave some tips on improving workouts on treadmills and rowing machines by using timed and distance intervals.
- Week 4: Shannan and Michelle demonstrated some core exercises to minimise back injuries. Dr Swan discussed heart disease and risk factors. Janella made a beef curry and salmon patties, as alternatives to frozen meals and fast food. The special guest was Alison Braun, the runner-up in season 3 of The Biggest Loser, who shared her experiences before, during and after her time on The Biggest Loser. The challenge was to make healthy alternatives to popular takeaway meals.
- Week 5: Shannan and Michelle demonstrated some more core-strengthening exercises, focusing on the back. Janella made healthy alternatives to quick meals on the go: a chicken & pumpkin salad mountain bread wrap (as an alternative to a ham & cheese toastie), and a baby quiche (as an alternative to a king-sized meat pie). The special guest was mountaineer Lincoln Hall, who told the story of his ascent to the summit of Mount Everest and surviving the night near the summit after being left for dead. Dr Swan and health psychologist Dr Lenny Vartanian of the University of New South Wales talked to the contestants about the psychology behind eating. The challenge this week was to create a training circuit from items that can be found around the house. After designing their exercises, the couples demonstrated them to Shannan and Michelle, and then they all ran through the entire circuit, spending one minute at each exercise.
- Week 6: Shannan and Michelle showed the contestants some games and activities they can do with friends and family to keep fit and be positive role models: basketball, bike riding and rollerblading. Dr Swan talked about carbohydrates. Janella showed the difference between good and bad carbohydrates. She made some meals with good carbohydrates: a wholemeal pasta with chicken & vegetables, brown fried rice, and couscous with lentils. The special guest was paralympian Kurt Fearnley, who shared the story of how he crawled the Kokoda Track. For their challenge, the contestants had to cook healthy breakfasts for a peloton of cyclists.
- Week 7: Shannan demonstrated some chest exercises: bench press (a compound exercise), chest fly (an isolation exercise) and push ups (a total body exercise). Dr Swan discussed sleep disorders and sleep hygiene. Janella made a healthy Australian barbecue: spicy prawn skewers with asparagus salad, baby snapper with green bean salad, and kangaroo wholemeal burgers. The special guest was swimming coach Laurie Lawrence. For their challenge, the contestants had to design training programs to work around injuries.
- Week 8: Michelle demonstrated some fun activities to do with friends and family to stay fit in regular life: skipping, frisbee-throwing, and walking & playing with your dog. Dr Swan and Professor Bob Montgomery, president of the Australian Psychological Society, talked about goals and motivation. Janella made some meals for a whole day: orange couscous with apricots, sultanas and yoghurt for breakfast; a Mediterranean salmon and chickpea sandwich for lunch; and a pork stir-fry with quinoa for dinner. The special guest was Sean Holbrook, a contestant from season 3 of The Biggest Loser, who shared how much his life had changed after losing weight on The Biggest Loser and afterwards, in particular being cured of type 2 diabetes. For their challenge, the contestants had to cook healthy lunches for a gym class.
- Week 9: Shannon and Michelle demonstrated some weight-training programs: chest press, lateral pulldown, shoulder press, squats, and Swiss ball hamstring curl. Janella cooked healthy dinner party food: an antipasto platter for starters, Tandoori chicken with mashed pumpkin and carrot for the main course, and Bliss Balls for dessert. The special guest was Hawaiian Ironman world champion Craig Alexander, who shared his experience of running and winning the 2009 Ironman triathlon, and inspired the contestants in the lead-up to their 42 km marathon. Dr Swan was away, so Shannan, Michelle, and podiatrist Peter Lumb discussed feet, footwear, and foot injuries. Kim and Neil from The Athlete's Foot assessed Rick's feet and the type of footwear suitable for him. There was no Masterclass challenge this week.
- Week 10: The contestants had a training session with a Māori warrior, using the taiaha. New Zealand chef Charles Royal took the contestants to find ingredients in the bush and then demonstrated some traditional Māori cooking: Kawakawa wild-herb chicken, and a Manuka smoked lamb rack. The contestants received a traditional Māori welcome into the community. For their challenge, the contestants were taken to the Sky Tower in Auckland, and had to participate in the SkyJump, a 192m jump off the tower.
- Week 11: No Masterclass aired this week.
- Week 12: Janella gave a list of good foods, and cooked a meal using some of them: a quinoa pilaf (a salad with chicken and vegetables). She then made a healthy birthday cake: a chocolate walnut and orange cake. Finally, she made a healthy afternoon snack for kids: carrot and zucchini muffins. Dr Swan tested David's blood pressure, and talked about the genetic attraction to fatty foods and how to control this attraction, with Shannon as a test subject. Michelle demonstrated how to use super sets to maximise the use of workout time, alternating between cardio training and strength training exercises non-stop. The special guest speaker was Rowena McEvoy, who dropped out of school in Year 10 but worked her way up to become a successful trainer and businesswoman in the aerobics industry. For their challenge, the contestants cooked delicious affordable seafood meals.
- Week 13: Michelle and guest trainer Rachel Crompton, a former professional ballet dancer, taught the contestants about Pilates and good posture. Dr Swan and Paul Taylor, director of The Human Performance Institute, gave the contestants the results of their BioAge tests, including DXA scans showing body fat, key test results, and the changes in their biological age. Janella showed how to cook healthy versions of some of the contestants' favourite meals: a vegetarian lasagne, a Thai-style seafood curry, and a steak with mushrooms and sweet potato chips. For their challenge, the contestants each had to instruct a class in a workout in a particular activity. The special guest speaker was Bob, winner of the previous year of The Biggest Loser, who spoke to the contestants about dealing with life after the competition.

==== Masterclass Challenges ====
- Week 1: No Masterclass aired this week.
- Week 2: No Masterclass aired this week.
- Week 3: The challenge this week was a ten-minute workout. Each couple had a different exercise station, and had ten minutes to burn as many calories as possible. Whichever couple burnt the most calories (according to their heart-rate watches, and adjusted for their relative sizes) won the challenge. The couples picked their exercise stations out of a bag in the following order:
  - Caitlin & Daina: Punching bag (248 calories burnt, 5th place)
  - Elise & Teneale: Steps (226 calories burnt, 6th place)
  - Wayne & Geoff (although Geoff could not compete due to medical conditions): Mat area (130 calories (x2 = 260 calories) burnt, 4th place)
  - David & Phil: Treadmills (308 calories burnt, 2nd place)
  - Jarna & Lisa: Cross trainers (186 calories burnt, 7th place)
  - Jenni & Phoebe: Rowers (176 calories burnt, 8th place)
  - Chris & Shannon: Spin bike combo (297 calories burnt, 3rd place)
  - Rick & Joe: Free weights (461 calories burnt, 1st place)
- Week 4: The challenge this week was to cook healthy alternatives to popular fast food dishes. After being allocated a dish, each couple had $15 and 15 minutes at the local supermarket to buy ingredients for their healthy alternative. They then returned and had 60 minutes to cook their meals, to be judged by Shannon, Michelle and Hayley. Each couple chose a fast food dish at random in the following order:
  - Caitlin & Daina: Fish & chips with mayonnaise sauce (alternative: pan-fried white basa with sweet potato & parsnip chips)
  - Wayne & Phoebe: Hamburger with the lot (alternative: kangaroo burger with hollowed-out Soy-Lin bun and vegetables)
  - Chris & Shannon: Steak, baked potatoes, mushrooms & creamy sauce (alternative: rib-eye steak with mashed cauliflower and other vegetables)
  - Rick & Joe: Big breakfast with bacon, fried eggs, sausages & hash brown (alternative: egg-white omelette with chicken, capsicum, shallots & onion plus a side dish of garlic, mushrooms and grilled capsicum)
  - Elise & Teneale: Creamy pasta carbonara with bacon (alternative: wholemeal pasta with tomato-based sauce & chicken)
  - Jarna & Lisa: Family sized pizza (alternative: prawn & pine nut pizza with ham & low-fat ricotta cheese)
  - David & Phil: Roast chicken with skin on, roast vegetables & gravy (alternative: steamed chicken breast, no skin on, healthy vegetables)
  The winners as judged by Shannan, Michelle and Hayley were Rick & Joe. An extra mention was made for Wayne & Phoebe's hamburger, and the Coach's Encouragement Award from Shannan went to David & Phil (as it was Phil's first meal ever cooked).
- Week 5: The challenge this week was to create a gym workout out of items commonly found around the home. Each couple was allocated an area of the body to target with their workout, and a collection of household items. The couples had to design two exercises, using the items, that would work the muscles in their allocated area of the body. The workouts were judged by Shannan and Michelle based on creativity and effectiveness in working the target area. The couples picked their target areas out of a bag in the following order:
  - Wayne & Phoebe: Arms
  - Caitlin & Daina: Legs
  - Jarna & Lisa: Shoulders
  - Chris & Shannon: Dynamic core
  - David & Phil: Chest
  - Rick & Joe Back
  The couples had 15 minutes to design their exercises, which had to be safe, efficient and effective. The winners were Caitlin & Daina, who designed an agility cardio workout stepping in tyres, and a step workout.
- Week 6: The contestants had to cook breakfasts for a peloton of 30 cyclists. There were four tents, each with an ingredient that was to be the core of their breakfast: eggs, bread, pancakes, and oats. Teams were chosen by the contestants running to the tent of their choice, with a maximum of three contestants to a tent. The teams had a short time to decide what to cook, and then one member from each team had a minute to make a single trip to the table of ingredients to choose the rest of their ingredients. The teams then had half an hour to cook their meals. The cyclists then arrived and ate their choice of breakfasts, and then voted on their favourite meal. Whichever team received the most votes would win the challenge.
  - Eggs tent: (Joe and Caitlin): Scrambled eggs with onion, garlic, parsley, mushrooms, grilled capsicum and tomato.
  - Bread tent (Daina and Phil): 2 types of bruschetta (tomato, spinach, onion and balsamic vinegar; and mushrooms, ham, cottage cheese and parsley).
  - Pancakes tent (David, Rick and Phoebe): Banana wholemeal pancakes with sliced fruit, ricotta, lemon juice and lemon zest.
  - Oats tent (Lisa, Jarna and Shannon): Wet muesli with dried fried and yoghurt, toasted oat trifles layered with yoghurt and fresh fruit.
  The eggs tent came fourth with 4 votes, the oats and bread tents came equal second (unknown number of votes) and the pancakes tent won with 9 votes.
- Week 7: The contestants were taken to Fitness First, and worked in groups of three to design workout plans to allow someone to train despite having an injury. The groups each developed a minimum of three exercises to train while protecting the injured part of the body. They were to be judged by Shannon and the gym's physiotherapist Todd on how efficiently, effectively and safely their workout exercised their whole body without troubling their injury. They could use any part of the gym, and had 5 minutes to devise their workout plan and 10 minutes to demonstrate it. There were three teams, each having to work around having a particular injury:
  - Hamstring injury team (Lisa (leader), Shannon and Phil): lateral pulldowns & chest presses, grinder machine, and boxing.
  - Rotator cuff injury team (David (leader), Rick and Joe): cross trainers & crunches, leg presses & squats with medicine ball, quad & hamstring isolation exercises.
  - Ankle injury team (Caitlin (leader), Jarna and Phoebe): Their workout consisted of boxing & crunches, spin bikes at low resistance, and weights (lat pulldown, shoulder press, chest press, and row).
  The hamstring team had the safest workout, but they could have done more with exercising shoulders and arms. The rotator cuff team had a comprehensive workout but the medicine ball exercise was a little unsafe for a shoulder injury. The winners were the ankle team of Caitlin, Jarna and Phoebe.
- Week 8: The contestants cooked healthy lunches. They worked in pairs, each with a designated lunch option, and had 1 hour to make lunches to present to a gym circuit class of 20 people, who would then vote on their favourite lunch option, considering calories, nutritional value, presentation and flavour. Whichever pair received the most votes would win the challenge. The pairs were:
  - Caitlin and David (sandwiches): ham, egg & salad sandwiches, and roast beef & salsa sandwiches - 5 votes.
  - Lisa and Rick (wraps): chicken & avocado wraps, and char-grilled vegetable wraps - 10 votes.
  - Shannon and Phoebe (salads): Caesar salad, and tuna & chickpea salad - 5 votes.
- Week 9: There was no Masterclass challenge aired this week.
- Week 10: The contestants took part in the SkyJump, a jump off the Auckland Sky Tower from a height of 192m. This was not a normal Masterclass challenge for the Masterclass Champion's Shield, but rather a chance for the contestants to face their fears, similar to what they had been doing all week for their time in New Zealand. David, Lisa and Phoebe made the jump, but Shannon was unable to participate as he was over the weight limit. Shannan (the trainer) also jumped.
- Week 11: No Masterclass aired this week.
- Week 12: The contestants had to cook delicious affordable seafood meals for two, each using a different type of seafood. The contestants were given a $15 budget. Dishes were judged by Shannan, Michelle and Hayley based on nutrition, calories, taste, presentation and cost. The contestants had 10 minutes to shop for their ingredients and then 30 minutes to prepare and plate their meals.
  - Daina was assigned white fish (snapper, flathead, barramundi). She cooked a garlic- and herb-seasoned flathead fillet with a char-grilled vegetable salad for $9.39 per serve.
  - Lisa was assigned oily fish (mullet, salmon, sardines, mackerel). She cooked a rocket and roast vegetable salad with salmon and a dill, honey and lemon juice dressing for $8.08 per serve.
  - Wayne was assigned whole fish (snapper, flathead, whiting, bream). He cooked a whole snapper with tomato bocconcini for $9.08 per serve.
  - David was assigned seafood with legs (squid, octopus). He cooked a Thai-style calamari with salad and prawn toast for $10.25 per serve.
  - Shannon was assigned shellfish or crustaceans (mussels, oysters, prawns, crabs). He cooked a banana prawn, asparagus, snow pea and chili stir-fry for $7.03 per serve.
  The winner as judged by Shannan, Michelle and Hayley was Shannon.
- Week 13: The contestants each had to teach a class of gym regulars in a 30-minute workout in a particular activity. The activities they were assigned were:
  - Shannon: boxing
  - Daina: circuit training
  - Lisa: spinning
  - Phil: calisthenics
  - Wayne: AFL footy fitness
  - Joe: boot camp
  Each class was assigned a professional trainer to observe and report to Michelle, who made the final decision on the winner. Michelle awarded the win to Joe, who gave a class in which Michelle felt a desire to participate.

Week	Title	Winner(s)
1	N/A	N/A
2	N/A	N/A
3	Calorie Challenge	Rick & Joe
4	Healthy Choice Challenge	Rick & Joe
5	Junkyard Gym Challenge	Caitlin & Daina
6	Big Bike Breakfast Challenge	David, Rick and Phoebe
7	Exercising with Injuries	Caitlin, Jarna and Phoebe
8	Healthy Lunch Challenge	Lisa and Rick
9	N/A	N/A
10	SkyJump	N/A
11	N/A	N/A
12	Seafood Cooking Challenge	Shannon
13	Instructor Challenge	Joe

Note: The Masterclass Champion's Shield was seen up close in Week 13's Masterclass, showing the titles of all the Masterclass challenges up to and including Week 12 (excluding the SkyJump in Week 10). In addition to the challenges listed in the table above, there was an additional challenge entitled "Food Court Challenge", which was won by Jarna & Lisa. The label for this challenge was visible on the Shield during Week 3's Masterclass challenge, which suggests that a Masterclass challenge of this title was held in either Week 1 or 2 but was never aired (due to heavy re-editing of the first two weeks).

=== Eliminations ===
Contestants below the yellow line following the weigh-in become up for elimination. Generally, the two couples (in the couples phase) or two contestants (in the singles phase) with the lowest percentage weight loss at the weigh-in fall below the yellow line. However, holding immunity prevents a couple or contestant from falling below the yellow line even if they have one of the lowest percentage weight loss, and the couple or contestant with the next lowest percentage weight loss falls below the yellow line instead. Positioning below the yellow line may also vary for a special competition week where the rules of the yellow line are modified for the week.

At eliminations, contestants must vote strategically to stay in the game and eliminate another contestant by a majority vote. If the vote is a tie (a "hung vote"), the couple or contestant with the lowest percentage weight loss will be eliminated. In the case of an elimination with more than two couples or contestants and there is a hung vote, the couple or contestant with the lowest percentage weight loss out of those having equal highest votes is eliminated.

- Week 1 - Allan & Romi (4–1): While Chris & Shannon voted to keep Allan & Romi as they had a lot at stake (they needed to lose weight to have a baby), other couples felt that they posed a bigger threat than Phoebe & Jenni. As a result, Allan and Romi were the first couple to be eliminated. Before leaving the elimination room, Allan gave the Double bracelet to Caitlin.
- Week 2 - None: Week 2 was presented as a non-elimination week. However, it has been mentioned outside of the show that the 10th team (light blue team; unmentioned) was eliminated this week. It is unknown, though, how they were eliminated. However, Shannon mentions in the following week that it is his and Chris's "second time in a row below the yellow line", so this could imply that it was the light blue & dark blue team that were below the yellow line and the light blue team was voted out.
- Week 3 - Geoff (Medical issues): Geoff decided at the weigh-in to leave after he found out about a chronic disease.
- Week 3 - Jenni (3–1): This week, due to Geoff leaving the game voluntarily, instead of a whole couple leaving Camp Biggest Loser, only one contestant will leave Camp Biggest Loser and the other member will be teamed with Wayne to become the new red team. During elimination, after Caitlin didn't believe Chris' comment of him doing his best he possibly could, Chris began to conflict with other contestants. Eventually, Hayley had to put a stop to the fight before the matter escalated. In the vote, Jenni and Phoebe received three votes which was enough for the couple to be eliminated since a hung vote would not save them for being the smallest losers. As part of the elimination, Jenni left Camp Biggest Loser and Phoebe was teamed up with Wayne to become the red couple. After Jenni left, Chris made an apology to Caitlin and the others for his behaviour and Caitlin accepted and also apologised to Chris for her comments made about Chris. After elimination, Phoebe made a few comments to Chris regarding the incident and losing her aunt in the competition and in the end, Chris left the group for some time alone.
- Week 4 - Elise & Teneale (3–2): During this elimination, it was revealed that there was a secret alliance (called "the Firm") that had been in play since week 1. The Firm alliance consisted of 5 couples: Wayne & Geoff, Rick & Joe, David & Phil, Caitlin & Daina, and Elise & Teneale. As Wayne's new partner, Phoebe became a part of the Firm. The Firm's goal was to get all of them to the final 10. One of the rules of the Firm was that if two Firm couples were to fall below the yellow line, the couple with the lowest percentage weight loss would be voted out. As it turned out, this situation occurred this week with David & Phil and Elise & Teneale both below the yellow line. Caitlin & Daina were conflicted because even though the Firm's rules stated they should vote out Elise & Teneale as they had the lowest percentage weight loss, they felt a bond with them. The votes from the other couples were split evenly, so Caitlin & Daina had the deciding vote. In the end, they followed the Firm's rule and voted out Elise & Teneale.
- Week 5 - Wayne (sole vote): Caitlin & Daina had the sole vote this week. Wayne approached them and stated that he was willing to go home in order to see his family, feeling that he had accomplished what he set out to do. Daina & Caitlin voted Wayne out.
- Week 6 - Chris (Temptation): Chris left the game due to Temptation, without chance of return. See Challenges section for details.
- Week 6 - Daina (4–4): After winning last week's weigh-in against the five couples, sisters Caitlin and Daina were both below the yellow line for the first time without holding immunity. Daina wanted everyone to vote for her since she didn't have much weight to lose and Caitlin still had weight to lose. Phoebe decided to change sides against the Firm and voted with Jarna, Lisa and Shannon for strategic reasons (to eliminate the bigger threat), not believing the Firm will stick to their word to protect her. In the end, the vote was hung at 4–4 and since Daina had the lowest percentage weight loss, she was eliminated. After the votes were read, Caitlin commented that she wanted nothing more to do with those that voted against her (particularly Phoebe, whom she felt she had tried to include as part of the Firm), but later apologised, stating that she didn't want to be an angry and defensive person any more. Phoebe voted against Caitlin for strategy and believed it was the right move to make in the end.
- Week 7 - Jarna (3-2-0-0): Jarna, Phil, Caitlin and Phoebe were all below the yellow line as part of the head-to-head competition for the week, but votes focused on Jarna and Phil as the two bigger threats in the game. Lisa and Shannon focused on Phil as the best target to have a chance of saving Jarna, while Rick & Joe voted with their allegiances against Jarna. David considered voting Phil out to get rid of him as a threat, but ultimately felt that he couldn't go against his friend and former couples partner.
- Week 8 - Caitlin (2–2): Lisa and Caitlin were below the yellow line. Rick and David voted for Lisa to protect their alliance with Caitlin, and Phoebe voted for Caitlin to get rid of her as the bigger threat. It was a tough decision for Shannon, as he felt Caitlin was the bigger threat but could also empathise with Caitlin and understood that she still needed to be at Camp Biggest Loser to lose more weight and learn more. In the end, Shannon voted for Caitlin, and with a hung vote, Caitlin was eliminated with the lower percentage weight loss.
- Week 9 - Rick (2–1): Phoebe and Rick were below the yellow line. David was loyal to Rick and Lisa was loyal to Phoebe. Shannon had a difficult decision as he was close to both Phoebe and Rick, but he had a stronger alliance with Phoebe, so he voted Rick out in order to protect himself.
- Week 10 - None: No one was eliminated this week.
- Week 11 - Phoebe (1–1): David chose to eliminate Lisa for strategic reasons, as she was the bigger threat. Shannon had a difficult decision as both Lisa and Phoebe were his closest friends. He chose to vote for Phoebe as she would be able to return for the marathon, whereas if Lisa was to be voted out she would be unable to run the marathon due to her foot injuries. With a hung vote, Phoebe was eliminated due to having the lower percentage weight loss.
- Week 12 - David (2–0): Daina and David were below the yellow line. Lisa and Shannon voted for David for strategic reasons, as he was the bigger threat. Although not required to reveal his vote, Wayne revealed that he had also voted for David to have everything out in the open and be honest before David, but still pay him tribute. David passed the Nothing bracelet to Daina as he didn't want to pass it to someone that had a chance of winning the competition and felt Daina was least likely to win.
- Week 13 - Phil (lost weigh-in after returning from training with The Commando): Whichever contestant out of Phil and Joe (having trained with The Commando for 5 weeks) recorded a lower percentage weight loss since Day 1 of the competition would be eliminated straightaway while the other faced the remaining contestants in the regular weigh-in as usual. Phil lost to Joe (see Weigh-Ins section for details) and so was eliminated.
- Week 13 - Daina (2–0): Lisa and Daina were below the yellow line. While Lisa was the bigger threat, Daina did not want a position in the final 4 due to the pressure she felt would be on her as well as the guilt of taking it away from Lisa, and asked Joe and Wayne to vote her out. Joe and Wayne were torn between following Daina's wishes and eliminating Lisa as a threat, but finally chose to eliminate Daina as they decided that they wanted good competition in the lead-up to the finale to drive them to their best results.

Contestant	Wk 1	Wk 2	Wk 3	Wk 4	Wk 5	Wk 6	Wk 7	Wk 8	Wk 9	Wk 10	Wk 11	Wk 12	Wk 13
Eliminated	Allan & Romi	None	Geoff, Jenni	Elise & Teneale	Wayne	Chris, Daina	Jarna	Caitlin	Rick	None	Phoebe	David	Phil, Daina
Lisa	?	SAFE	Chris & Shannon	David & Phil	X	Caitlin	Phil	X	Rick	SAFE	X	David	X
Joe	Allan & Romi	SAFE	?	Elise & Teneale	X	Daina	Jarna	Northern Territory Team - Commando					Daina
Shannon	Jenni & Phoebe	SAFE	X	David & Phil	X	Caitlin	Phil	Caitlin	Rick	SAFE	Phoebe	David	?
Wayne	Allan & Romi	SAFE	?	Elise & Teneale	X	Eliminated Wk 5, Returned Wk 12						?	Daina
Daina	Allan & Romi	SAFE	Jenni & Phoebe	Elise & Teneale	Wayne	X	Eliminated Wk 6, Returned Wk 12					X	X
Phil	Allan & Romi	SAFE	Jenni & Phoebe	X	X	Daina	X	Northern Territory Team - Commando					X
David	Allan & Romi	SAFE	Jenni & Phoebe	X	X	Daina	Jarna	Lisa	Phoebe	SAFE	Lisa	X	Eliminated Wk 12
Phoebe	X	SAFE	X	Elise & Teneale	X	Caitlin	X	Caitlin	X	SAFE	X	Eliminated Wk 11	
Rick	Allan & Romi	SAFE	?	Elise & Teneale	X	Daina	Jarna	Lisa	X	Eliminated Wk 9			
Caitlin	Allan & Romi	SAFE	Jenni & Phoebe	Elise & Teneale	Wayne	X	X	X	Eliminated Wk 8				
Jarna	?	SAFE	Chris & Shannon	David & Phil	X	Caitlin	X	Eliminated Wk 7					
Chris	Jenni & Phoebe	SAFE	X	David & Phil	X	X	Money Offer Wk 6						
Elise	?	SAFE	Jenni & Phoebe	X	Eliminated Wk 4								
Teneale	?	SAFE	Jenni & Phoebe	X	Eliminated Wk 4								
Jenni	X	SAFE	X	Eliminated Wk 3									
Geoff	Allan & Romi	SAFE	X	Left Wk 3 for medical reasons									
Allan	X	Eliminated Wk 1											
Romi	X	Eliminated Wk 1											

=== Special Guest Trainers ===
Apart from the special guests at Masterclass and the appearance of Hazem El Masri for a "Family Reveal" for Phil, there have been a number of celebrities who have come in as special guest trainers for the contestants. This occurs most often straight after an elimination, to pick up the contestants' spirits after the weight of the elimination process.

- Episode 8: The NSW Waratahs (after Week 3 elimination)
- Episode 11: Matt Shirvington (before Week 4's 10 km run)
- Episode 14: Anthony "The Man" Mundine (after Week 4 elimination)
- Episode 26: The Bondi Rescue lifeguards (after Week 6 elimination)
- Episode 32: Craig Lowndes (after Week 7 elimination)
- Episode 38: Layne Beachley (after Week 8 elimination)
- Episode 44: Kyle Vander Kuyp and a group of kids from Red Dust Role Models (with The Commando, Phil and Joe in the Northern Territory, after their Week 9 weigh-in)
- Episode 52: Jason Coleman from So You Think You Can Dance Australia, and other dancers from the show
- Episode 53: Rochelle Gilmore, and Hayley Lewis

== Finale ==
The 18 contestants returned for the finale where they weighed-in to determine the winner of The Biggest Loser 2010 as well as the winner out of the eliminated contestants.

Apart from the contestants, others in attendance at the finale were Hayley Lewis (as host), trainers Shannan and Michelle, The Commando, Janella Purcell, Hazem El Masri, Joh Bailey, Adro and Tracy from season 1, Courtney from season 2, Sean, Alison and Sam from season 3, and Meaghan, Sammy, Sharif and Bob from season 4.

Geoff and Chris were ineligible to win the eliminated contestants' competition (Geoff left the competition at his own choice due to medical issues, and Chris left during a Temptation by accepting cash), but they weighed-in along with the other eliminated contestants. Rick was the winner out of the eliminated contestants.

From the original prize money of $200,000 set aside for the winner of The Biggest Loser, $15,000 was taken by Chris when he took the Temptation offer of cash to leave the competition, so the prize for the winner of The Biggest Loser became $185,000. If the holder of the Double bracelet won the competition, they would win twice this amount ($370,000), and if the holder of the Nothing bracelet won the competition, they would win $0. Lisa was the winner, and as she held the Double bracelet, she won $370,000.

Hayley Lewis announced that the 2011 series of The Biggest Loser would include families of four of any combination.

=== Eliminated Contestants' Weigh In ===
Contestant	Starting Weight (kg)	Final Weight (kg)	Weight Lost (kg)	Percentage Lost	Position (out of Eliminated Contestants)
Rick	172.6	97.2	75.4	43.68%	1st
David	165.6	99.2	66.4	40.10%	2nd
Teneale	97.4	58.8	38.6	39.63%	3rd
Phil	146.9	93.0	53.9	36.69%	4th
Jarna	118.8	75.5	43.3	36.45%	5th
Elise	104.6	66.7	37.9	36.23%	6th
Jenni	130.6	84.3	46.3	35.45%	7th
Phoebe	116.0	76.9	39.1	33.71%	8th
Caitlin	179.4	124.8	54.6	30.43%	9th
Geoff	161.6	117.8	43.8	27.10%	10th
Daina	105.2	77.8	27.4	26.05%	11th
Chris	128.9	104.2	24.7	19.16%	12th
Allan	155.8	131.5	24.3	15.60%	13th
Romi	99.3	85.8	13.5	13.60%	14th

=== Final 4 Weigh-In ===
Contestant	Starting Weight (kg)	Final Weight (kg)	Weight Lost (kg)	Percentage Lost	Position
Lisa	121.9	65.7	56.2	46.10%	The Biggest Loser
Joe	179.9	97.2	82.7	45.97%	Runner up
Shannon	214.3	124.7	89.6	41.81%	3rd Place
Wayne	161.5	98.7	62.8	38.89%	4th Place

== Production and release ==
This season was to initially feature ten couples. However, on 25 January 2010 Ten announced that the series will be "radically re-edited and re-packaged" before its premiere to follow only nine couples following the arrest of contestant Deryck James Ward, who was charged with possession of child pornography by Queensland police on 16 January 2010. With part of the season having already been filmed, Ward and his sister had been the second pair eliminated from the show before his arrest. The resulting edits involved completely removing mention of the pair in the affected filmed episodes, including their elimination - which was instead presented on air as a non-elimination week, as well as the series condensing and "fasttracking" through the two weeks of challenges, weigh-ins and eliminations they had participated in.

Promos featured the song "Bodies" by Robbie Williams.
