= The Biggest Loser Australia: Families =

- Genre: Reality television, Game show
- Created by: NBC and Network Ten
- Developed by: FremantleMedia Australia
- Presented by: Hayley Lewis
- Starring: Michelle Bridges; Shannan Ponton; Steve Willis (a.k.a. The Commando); Tiffiny Hall
- Opening theme: "We Are Family" by Sister Sledge
- Ending theme: "We Are Family" by Sister Sledge
- Country of origin: Australia
- Original language: English
- No. of episodes: 53 (list of episodes)

Production
- Executive producers: Stuart Clark; Tara McWilliams
- Running time: 60 minutes with ads

Original release
- Network: Network Ten
- Release: 30 January – 2 May 2011

Related
- Season 5 (2010); Season 7 (2012); The Biggest Loser (American TV series)

The sixth season of the Australian version of the original NBC reality television series The Biggest Loser, known as The Biggest Loser Australia: Families, premiered on 30 January 2011 on Network Ten. This season saw the return of trainers Michelle Bridges, Shannan Ponton and Steve Willis (The Commando). It also introduced a new female trainer, Tiffiny Hall.

The families included in this season are the Duncan Family, the Westren Family, the Challenor Family and The Moon Family.

The season was announced during the Season 5 finale on 18 April 2010.

In a first for the show, its premiere week included each of the four trainers living with an overweight family and following the family's unhealthy diet and poor exercise.

The season began on 30 January 2011 and the finale aired on 2 May 2011 at 8:30pm.

The prize money pool for this season was at the most $300,000. The winning contestant of The Biggest Loser wins $100,000. The family with the biggest percentage weight loss also wins $100,000. If the winning contestant is a part of the winning family, that family also receives an additional $100,000.

The winner of Season 6 was Emma Duncan from the white team, trained by Tiffiny, and the winning family was the Westrens, trained by Shannan.

== Game variations ==
- Families: Season Six began with four families of four contestants.
- Four Nights a Week: Instead of the six-day format for this season, the show adopted a four nights a week format. It airs Sundays, Wednesdays, Thursdays and Fridays.
- Family Weigh-In: Every week, families will weigh-in together to see how much weight they lost since their first week at Camp Biggest Loser.
- Contests: One person representing their family will compete to win power for their family.

=== Schedule ===
- Sunday: Conclusion of Major Challenge, Weigh-In and Elimination
- Wednesday: Temptation
- Thursday: Family Weigh-Ins and The Contest
- Friday: Conclusion of the Contest and Major Challenge

=== Teams ===
Contestant	Week														
Contestant	1	2	3	4-1	4-2	5	6	7	8	9	10	11	12	13	Finale
Emma	The Duncans							Eliminated					White player	Black player	Biggest Loser
Leigh	The Westrens								Blue player			Black player			Runner-up
Kellie	The Moons								Black player			Black player			3rd Place
Sarah	The Moons								Black player			Black player			4th place
Nathaniel	The Challenors								Eliminated				Red player	Black player	Eliminated contestant
Rebecca	The Moons								Black player		Eliminated		Black player	Black player	Eliminated contestant
Joe	The Challenors								Red player			Black player		Eliminated	Eliminated contestant
Meg	The Duncans								White player			Black player	Eliminated		Eliminated contestant
Sharlene	The Westrens								Blue player			Black player	Eliminated		Biggest Loser among eliminated contestants
Lara	The Westrens								Blue player			Eliminated			Eliminated contestant
Damien	The Challenors			Eliminated	The Challenors				Red player	Re-eliminated					Eliminated contestant
Jodie	The Moons								Eliminated						Eliminated contestant
Craig	The Westrens						Eliminated								Eliminated contestant
Jarrod	The Duncans					Eliminated									Eliminated contestant
Sarah-Jayne	The Duncans		Eliminated	Eliminated contestant											
Greg	The Challenors	Eliminated									At Camp	Exited			Eliminated contestant

== Contestants ==
Four families of four are slated, totaling up to 16 contestants.

Contestants	Families team	First singles colour	Second singles colour	Third singles colour	Status	Votes when eliminated
Greg; The Challenors	Red team				Eliminated Week 1	4
Sarah-Jayne; The Duncans	White team				Eliminated Week 2	4
Damien; Returned, via's Joe's contest win	Red team				Eliminated Week 3	4
Jarrod; The Duncans	White team				Eliminated Week 4	1
Craig; The Westrens	Blue team				Eliminated Week 5	3
Emma; Returned, via Weigh-In	White team				Eliminated Week 6	3
Jodie; The Moons	Black team				Eliminated Week 7	Left by Challenge
Nathaniel; Returned, via Weigh-In	Red team				Eliminated Week 7	2
Damien; The Challenors	Red team	Red player			Re-eliminated Week 8	4
Rebecca; Returned, via Weigh-In	Black team	Black player			Eliminated Week 9	4
Lara; Returned, via Weigh-In	Blue team	Blue player			Eliminated Week 10	3
Sharlene; The Westrens	Blue team	Blue player	Black player		Eliminated Week 11	Left by Challenge
Meg; The Duncans	White team	White player	Black player		Eliminated Week 11	2
Lara; The Westrens	Blue team	Blue player	Eliminated contestant		Re-eliminated Week 12	Left by Challenge
Joe (Joseph); The Challenors	Red team	Red player	Black player	Black player	Eliminated Week 12	Left by Challenge
Rebecca; The Moons	Black team	Black player	Eliminated contestant	Black player	Re-eliminated Week 13	Left by Challenge
Nathaniel; The Challenors	Red team	None	Eliminated contestant	Black player	Re-eliminated Week 13	2
Sarah; The Moons	Black team	Black player	Black player	Black player	3rd Runner-up	0
Kellie; The Moons	Black team	Black player	Black player	Black player	2nd Runner-up	0
Leigh; The Westrens	Blue team	Blue player	Black player	Black player	Runner-up	0
Emma; The Duncans	White team	None	Eliminated contestant	Black player	The Biggest Loser	0

=== Premiere Week ===
For its premiere week, the trainers lived with the contestants and followed their diet of poor nutrition, excessive portions and no exercise.

They subsequently weighed in during the Week 1 episode, revealing that they had all gained substantial weight.

Trainer	Age	Height	Initial BMI	Week 1 BMI	Initial weight (kg)	Week 1 weight(kg)	Weight difference (kg)	Percentage gained
Shannan Ponton	38	183 cm	25.2	26.7	84.5	89.5	+5.0	+5.92%
Tiffiny Hall	26	163 cm	21.4	23.1	56.9	61.5	+4.6	+8.08%
Steve "Commando" Willis	34	186 cm	26.7	28.6	92.5	99.1	+6.6	+7.14%
Michelle Bridges	39	170 cm	20.7	22.7	59.7	65.5	+5.8	+9.72%

=== Weigh-ins ===
Contestant	Age	Starting BMI	Ending BMI	Starting weight	Week															Finale	Weight lost	Percentage lost
Contestant	Age	Starting BMI	Ending BMI	Starting weight	1	2	3	4	5	6	7	8		9	10	11	12		13	Finale	Weight lost	Percentage lost
Emma	25	38.7	20.7	133.9	123.9	120.3	114.8	110.2	102.4	99.0							84.2	79.7	76.9	71.8	62.1	46.38%
Leigh	23	38.0	21.2	130.1	121.2	115.7	115.1	107.9	102.9	96.3	91.8	89.3	89.0	87.0	82.6	80.0	X	78.5	76.1	72.4	57.7	44.38%
Kellie	33	41.2	25.3	127.7	123.0	117.8	115.3	111.5	106.2	103.8	99.7	97.0	96.2	93.0	91.5	88.9	X	86.0	83.3	78.5	49.2	38.53%
Sarah	29	44.9	30.0	150.5	147.8	141	137.5	133.1	128.3	123.4	119.5	118.0	117.1	114.9	111.4	108.9	X	106.4	104.2	100.7	49.8	33.09%
Nathaniel	18	37.7	23.8	142.0	134.3	128.2	123.6	119.2	112.8	108.2	105.3						91.5	88.4	86.2	89.5	52.5	36.97%
Rebecca	34	38.0	24.7	115.2	109.6	105.9	103.6	101.3	96.3	93.2	90.0	88.3	86.3	84.8			83.1	78.8	LEFT	74.8	40.4	35.07%
Joe	40	40.4	26.9	139.8	133.7	127.3	124.5	119.6	112.9	109.0	104.6	101.9	99.3	99.2	94.0	90.7	X	90.8		93.2	46.6	33.33%
Lara	25	36.2	22.6	107.1	97.6	94.2	92.9	87.1	83.8	78.2	75.1	73.4	73.0	70.4	69.7		70.1	LEFT		66.8	40.3	37.63%
Meg	25	40.9	23.8	137.0	126.1	123	118.6	113.8	107.0	103.8	101.6	95.7	99.7	92.3	90.7	88.2	89.4			79.7	57.3	41.82%
Sharlene	50	41.6	23.8	113.3	106.7	103.6	100.8	96.6	95.2	89.2	86.1	82.2	82.1	78.7	76.8	LEFT	74.3			64.8	48.5	42.81%
Damien	43	88.2	57.5	234.4	220.3	209.9	202.2	201.6	187.9	182.3	173.6	169.6					164.8			152.8	81.6	34.81%
Jodie	42	33.7	23.9	106.5	99.0	94.9	94.1	90.7	87.2	84.1	LEFT						81.5			75.6	30.9	29.01%
Craig	53	40.1	24.4	120.1	109.7	105.1	101.4	98.0	96.0								81.5			73.2	46.9	39.05%
Jarrod	23	39.7	28.1	143.3	129.2	126.8	122.3	118.5									113.2			101.3	42.0	29.31%
Sarah-Jayne	29	47.0	28.1	123.3	115.0	111.9											84.7			73.8	49.5	40.15%
Greg	47	48.6	38.1	177.2	169.4												146.8			138.8	38.4	21.67%

- In Week 7, Jodie was eliminated by the Westrens due to being a part of the losing team in the obstacle course challenge.
- Halfway through week 8, there was a surprise weigh-in, and the winner would win Immunity. Joe won immunity by losing 2.6 kg, and Meg actually put on 4.0 kg as she previously consumed over 4000 calories at temptation; however Joe consumed over 3000, but managed to pull a big enough number.
- In Week 10, Joe won a 1 kg advantage at the Major Challenge, and he could keep it or give away. As he had immunity he gave the 1 kg advantage to Rebecca and that kept her over the yellow line.
- In Week 11, Sharlene was eliminated at the Super Challenge for having picked the dish with the highest calories.
- In Week 12, Lara was eliminated at the first Challenge for not winning any rounds.
- In Week 13, Rebecca was eliminated at the Contest, having lost the final round.
- After the Week 11 weigh-in Meg was eliminated, having weighed in at 88.2 kg, but weighed in at 89.4 kg at the eliminated contestant's weigh-in that same week.

Contestants

- Winner (among finalists)
- Winner (among eliminated)
- (put up for elimination by their family week 1-6) Below the yellow Line
- Had immunity for the week
- Gained weight at the Surprise Immunity Weigh-In
- Gained weight and below the yellow line
- Brought back into the game after week 12 Public family weigh-in
- Had immunity but lost it due to gaining weight, and below the yellow line
- Last person eliminated before finale
- The week's biggest loser
- The contestant returned to the competition
- Had immunity and the week's biggest loser
- LEFT - The contestant left the competition before a weigh-in (by choice or challenge)
- Won Immunity at the surprise Immunity Weigh-In

BMIs

- Healthy Body Mass Index (less than 25.0 BMI)
- Overweight Body Mass Index (25.0 - 29.9 BMI)
- Obese Class I (30.0 - 34.9 BMI)
- Obese Class II Index (35.0 - 39.9 BMI)
- Obese Class III (40.0 or above)

Family	Starting weight	Week	Finale	Weight lost	Percentage lost												
Family	Starting weight	1	Finale	Weight lost	Percentage lost	2	3	4	5	6	7	8	9	10	11	12	13
Westren Family	470.6	433.6	417	1,134.4	386.8	371.9	352.0	X	Singles						277.2	193.4	41.1%
Duncan Family	537.5	494.2	480.6	1,134.4	446.8	427.9	416.0	X	Singles						326.6	210.9	39.24%
Moon Family	499.9	472.9	456.6	X	431.5	415.9	400.0	X	Singles						329.6	170.3	34.07%
Challenor Family	693.4	658.1	630.2	610.2	601.4	569.8	550.0	X	Singles						474.3	219.1	31.6%

=== Weight loss history ===
Contestant	Week 1	Week 2	Week 3	Week 4	Week 5	Week 6	Week 7	Week 8	Week 9	Week 10	Week 11	Week 12	Week 13	Finale
Emma	-10.0	-3.6	-5.5	-4.6	-7.8	-3.4	-14.8					-4.5	-2.8	-5.1
Leigh	-8.9	-5.5	-0.6	-7.2	-5.0	-6.6	-4.5	-2.5	-2.3	-4.4	-2.6	-1.5	-2.4	-3.7
Kellie	-4.7	-5.2	-2.5	-3.8	-5.3	-2.4	-4.1	-2.7	-4.0	-1.5	-2.6	-2.9	-2.7	-4.8
Sarah	-2.7	-6.8	-3.5	-4.4	-4.8	-4.9	-3.9	-1.5	-3.1	-3.5	-2.5	-2.5	-2.2	-3.5
Nathaniel	-7.7	-6.1	-4.6	-4.4	-6.4	-4.6	-2.9	-13.8				-3.1	-2.2	+3.3
Rebecca	-5.6	-3.7	-2.3	-2.3	-5.0	-3.1	-3.2	-1.7	-3.5	-1.7		-4.3	N/A	-4.0
Joe	-6.1	-6.4	-2.8	-4.9	-6.7	-3.9	-4.4	-2.7	-2.7	-5.2	-3.3	+0.1		+2.4
Lara	-9.5	-3.4	-1.3	-5.8	-3.3	-5.6	-3.1	-1.7	-3.0	-0.7	+0.4	N/A		-3.3
Meg	-10.9	-3.1	-4.4	-4.8	-6.8	-3.2	-2.2	-5.9	-3.4	-1.6	-2.5			-9.7
Sharlene	-6.7	-3.1	-2.8	-4.2	-1.4	-6.0	-3.1	-3.9	-3.5	-1.9	N/A			-9.5
Damien	-14.1	-10.4	-7.7	-0.6	-13.7	-5.6	-8.7	-4.0						-12.0
Jodie	-7.5	-4.1	-0.8	-3.4	-3.5	-3.1	N/A							-5.9
Craig	-10.4	-4.6	-3.7	-3.4	-2.0									-8.2
Jarrod	-14.1	-2.4	-4.3	-3.8										-11.9
Sarah-Jayne	-8.3	-3.1		-10.9										
Greg	-7.8		-8.0											

=== Percentage Leaderboard ===
Position	Contestant	Starting Weight	Current Weight	Weight Lost	Total Percentage
1	Emma	133.9	71.8	62.1	46.38%
2	Leigh	130.1	72.4	57.7	44.38%
3	Sharlene	113.3	64.8	48.5	42.81%
4	Meg	137.0	79.7	57.3	41.82%
5	Sarah-Jayne	123.3	73.8	49.5	40.15%
6	Craig	120.1	73.2	46.9	39.05%
7	Kellie	127.7	78.5	49.2	38.53%
8	Lara	107.1	66.8	40.3	37.63%
9	Nathaniel	142.0	89.5	52.5	36.97%
10	Rebecca	115.2	74.8	40.4	35.07%
11	Damien	234.4	152.8	81.6	34.81%
12	Joe	139.8	93.2	46.6	33.33%
13	Sarah	150.5	100.7	49.8	33.09%
14	Jarrod	143.3	101.3	42.0	29.31%
15	Jodie	106.5	75.6	30.9	29.01%
16	Greg	177.2	138.8	38.4	21.67%

These results reflect the overall percentages achieved by all of the contestant, in chronological order.

=== Family Weigh-Ins ===
Every week, families weigh-in together to find out how much weight the whole family has lost since the beginning. Unlike the official weigh-ins, no elimination takes place. Instead, the family with the highest percentage weight loss since the start wins a special reward.

Week 1 - Premiere Week: This week, each contestant weighs themselves to find out what their starting weight will be for the remainder of the show. For the first time, each contestant weighs-in at home in front of their friends and family.

Week 4 - All vs. One: For the all vs. one week, the family of three weighed-in together and their total percentage weight loss was greater than the Challenors. For winning this weigh-in, the family of three got to decide from their own families who will be the champions for the upcoming contest. They chose Leigh from the Westrens, Jarrod from the Duncans and Kellie from the Moons.

Week 6: The Westrens won the family weigh-in and instead of winning a power for the upcoming contest, the Westrens got to dine out with their Loser Legend Bob as their reward. At the reward, Craig showed up to surprise Sharlene and a gift for her birthday.

Week 7: For the first time, eliminated contestants returned to the weigh-in and all four families weighed in together.

Week 8: Instead of families weighing in, Hayley first showed the contestants how much weight they all lost by showing the a gigantic tank full of fat onto the scale and revealed to be 509.9 kg. Next, Hayley announced that the contestants are competing as singles. This meant that weigh-ins, contests and challenges will be taken part as singles and they'll train with their same trainers. Finally, Hayley revealed the leaderboard with Lara in the lead and Sarah in last place.

Week 9 - Immunity Week: As singles, a surprise weigh-in took place instead. As part of the immunity week, Hayley told the contestants the second of four immunities was given out for whoever had the highest weight loss percentage since the last weigh-in. Joe won the weigh-in and the second immunity. For Meg, who won the first immunity through temptation, she gained four kilos. Hayley warned Meg that to keep her immunity, Meg must lose at least four kilos at the next weigh-in or else her immunity would be revoked.

Week 10: There was no weigh-in as the episode focused on the contestants receiving total body makeovers.

Week 11: There was no weigh-in as the episode focused on the beginning of the contestants sailing from Sydney to Hobart.

Week 12 - Eliminated Players Return: The eliminated contestants again weighed in at home, with the person from each family with the highest percentage weight loss returning to camp to compete in the contest.

=== Contests ===
The Contest is a brand new weekly challenge, which can be categorised into three separate categories - Endurance, Strength and Knowledge. The Champion of each Contest wins a power for their family, which usually adversely affects the family of their choosing.

Week 1 - Endurance: One member from each family must take part in a 10 km race on a treadmill in three bouts - a 2 km race, a 3 km race and a 5 km race. The person who came last in each round was eliminated. Joe from the Challenors and Leigh from the Westrens were knocked out respectively in the first two rounds. Ultimately, Jarrod from the Duncans beat Jodie from the Moons and had the power to remove one team's trainer until after the weigh-in. The Duncans decided to remove the Commando from the Moon family.

Week 2 - Strength: One member from each family must curl a bar on Hayley's count until one person fails to achieve the pace and was therefore eliminated. In the first two rounds, the chosen contestants must curl a 10 kg bar and then a 15 kg bar. In the final round, the two remaining contestants' bars will have an extra 5 kg put on their bar for every 10 curls done, added onto the 20 kg of weight already on the bar. Sarah from the Moons and Leigh from the Westrens respectively were knocked out in the first two rounds. Ultimately, Damien from the Challenors beat Jarrod from the Duncans and had the power to remove one team's access to their gym and force them to eat Chinese takeaway for every meal until after the weigh-in. The Challenors decided to penalise the Duncans.

Week 3 - Knowledge: Following the family weigh-in, in which the Westrens gained power over the Contest, they were the ones to pick who from each team was the one to take part in the Contest - one of Knowledge. They selected Jarrod from the Duncans, Craig from the Westrens, Rebecca from the Moons and Joe from the Challenors to face off. The Champions were allowed to pick one helper from their team to help their cause in the Contest, with Emma, Lara, Kellie and Nathaniel respectively being selected. The Champions had to answer multiple-choice questions on health and nutrition whilst their helpers carried the load of a 20 kg bar. For each question answered incorrectly, 5 kg of weight was added to the helper's bar. The last helper standing won. First, Kellie from the Moons dropped her bar at 40 kg of weight, and then Nathaniel of the Challenors at 45 kg. Finally, Emma dropped out at 75 kg, giving Lara and Craig from the Westrens the power, which was the power to select one family who must care for a 5 kg medicine ball 24 hours a day, keeping it from touching the floor including at the next major challenge. The Challenors were selected by the Westrens, with Joe mouthing off when his family was selected.

Week 4 - Supercontest: As part of the all-vs-one week, the team of three families took on the Challenors in a super contest, with three separate rounds each consisting of either endurance, strength and knowledge. One member from the super-family took on either Joe or Nathaniel from the Challenors in each round. The team which won two out of the three rounds won the biggest power of the series so far - the power to bring back one eliminated contestant. For winning the all vs. one family weigh-in, the super-family had the right to choose who's participating this contest and chose Jarrod, Kellie and Leigh to participate in their three rounds. Joe was chosen for the Challenors due to Nathaniel having a bad knee. The first round was strength, with Joe vs Leigh. This challenge involved holding a 1 kg dumbbell above a ribbon - first to drop lost the round. Leigh dropped out first after 34 minutes. The second was knowledge, with Joe vs Jarrod. This was "The Treadmill of Knowledge" - the treadmills started at 5 km/h, for every incorrect answer, the treadmill increased by 1 km/h. Last man standing won. Joe quit at 10 km/h. The final round was Joe vs Kellie in a battle of endurance. It was a bike race - first to cover 10 km won the supercontest. The Challenors won the final round, and as a result, brought Damien back. Had the Challenors lost, the three families would have brought Sarah-Jayne back, the only eliminated non-Challenor family contestant.

Week 5 - Waterside Supercontest: All four families, as a result of the Family Weigh-In, had their champions - Lara, Nathaniel, Rebecca and Emma - chosen for them by the Westrens to take part in a three-round contest that would involve all three skills. In the first round, the champions answered questions on nutrition. For every one they got wrong, their trainers, who were sat in boats on a swimming pool, had to put four buckets of water in their boat. The first trainer to sink was out, and this was Tiffiny and Emma was knocked out in round one for the Duncans. In the second round, Champions had to pick five 10-kilo bags up off the other end of the swimming pool floor and take them back to the start. This round was won by Lara, and Rebecca was knocked out for the Moons. In the final round, endurance, the remaining two champions had to hold onto a rope, which was the only thing suspending them from falling into the pool, as they were stood at a 45-degree angle on a ramp and leaning back. Every three minutes, they would have to lean further back by holding onto a knot that was lower in the rope. The first one to fall in lost, and this was Nathaniel and as a result, the Westrens won the ability to penalise one family with a 1 kg weight disadvantage in the upcoming weigh-in. They chose the Moons stating that it was fair to share the penalty around. The Moons didn't believe their reason and believed it was gameplay.

Week 6 - Loser Legends' Supercontest: The families were represented in the three rounds by their respective loser legends. The first round was test of endurance - a 2 km rowing race, with Sam winning the first round, Lisa coming second and Adro coming in third, meaning Bob got knocked out for the Westrens. The second round was a test of knowledge, with a family member answering the questions and the legends being the brawn. For their helpers, Adro chose Emma, Sam chose Nathaniel and Lisa chose Kellie. Each legend had to hold a bucket above the ground by a pulley - for each question wrong, Bob loaded one 5 kg sandbag onto the buckets of the other legends. First to drop went out, and after having 30 kg in her bucket, Lisa was the first to drop. In the final round, the two remaining legends had to bench press a 20 kg bar as many times as they could. Whoever did the most won the power for their family. The winner was Sam for the Challenors, and as a result, Sam got to give one of the Challenors immunity from the next weigh-in, and he chose Nathaniel.

Week 7 - The Log Supercontest: After the family weigh-in, the Westrens won the family weigh-in losing over 25 percent of their original weight. For winning the family weigh-in, the Westrens decided to have an even playing field in the upcoming contest and selected Kellie (because of her endurance), Damien (because of his strength), Meg (only member of the Duncan family) and Lara (because of her knowledge) as the champions. Rebecca believed that Westrens were pretending they weren't playing the game and actually picked the weakest members of the other families. For the supercontest, the champions had to saw a piece of wood from a log of a specific weight. In the first round, the champions had to cut a one kilo piece of wood, give or take twenty grams. Kellie failed to cut a kilo piece of wood after Meg, Damien and Lara got their kilo piece of wood. The second round had the remaining champions cut a two kilo piece of wood, give or take fifty grams. Meg failed to cut a two kilo piece of wood after Damien and Lara got their two kilo piece of wood. The third and final round had the last two champions cut a four kilo piece of wood, give or take two hundred grams. Damien successfully got his four kilo piece of wood and won the contest for the Challenors.

Week 8 - Knowledge: As a result of winning the Pyramid of Fitness, Leigh was the one who picked what discipline was played, which was knowledge. Lara, Leigh, Joe & Damien were selected as the champions, due to them being the top four of the weight loss leaderboard. The last remaining champion of the four would win two 1 kg advantages at the weigh-in - one for themselves and one for a person of their choosing. The Champions had to answer five questions, in order to bank 20 seconds for later, when they would have to do as many sit-ups as possible in their time limit. The Champion who did the least sit-ups was knocked out, and the remaining three would move on to round 2. Lara went first with her 80-second time limit, doing 49 sit-ups. Joe was next up with his 80-second time limit, managing to do 36 in his time. Damien was up third with only 60 seconds, and he managed to do 32 in one minute. Leigh was the final champion to take part in the first round, and he managed to 43 sit-ups, making Lara the winner of the first round, and Damien the first knocked out. In the second round, ten questions were asked, each banking twenty seconds in which the champions had to shoulder press weights - the boys pressing 17.5 kg and Lara pressing 12.5 kg. Leigh got seven questions right, and as a result had 140 seconds to shoulder press his bar. He managed to do 53 presses in his time. Joe was next up, and he had two minutes to shoulder press the bar, and he managed to do it 69 times, which guaranteed his passage to round 3 by beating Leigh. Lara was up last, and had 100 seconds in which to beat Leigh. She managed to beat him with a score of 68 times, and went through to face off against Joe in Round 3. In the final round, each question banked 1 minute, and with the time banked, they had to run as far as they could on a treadmill. Joe got all five questions right, and took five minutes with him into the final round. Lara only banked three minutes for herself, and as a result started two minutes after Joe did on the treadmill. Lara had a meltdown when she couldn't hold on for much longer when at 19 km/h in order to catch up to Joe, and stopped the treadmill. Joe managed to last 980m, as opposed to Lara's 400m, and as a result he won the advantages for himself, and in a shocking move, he picked Rebecca for the extra kilo, which ultimately pushed Damien under the yellow line (by 800 grams).

Week 9 - Endurance: As part of immunity week, the prize is the penultimate immunity prize. It consists of cross-trainers in round 1, treadmills in round 2, and sky walls (climbing walls) in the final round. Joe and Meg didn't have to take part in this contest since both of them have won immunity and were ineligible to win another one. There are therefore six champions - Kellie, Lara, Leigh, Rebecca, Sarah & Sharlene. In each round, two champions would be knocked out until the final round. In the first round, the champions had to travel 2 km on a cross-trainer with a resistance of 16. The last two to make it were knocked out. Lara was first, Leigh was second, Sarah was third, and Kellie finished fourth. This meant that Rebecca and Sharlene were knocked out in the first round. In Round 2, the remaining champions had to run 2 km on a treadmill, with an incline of 15. The first two to reach 2 km were through to the sky wall round. Leigh was the first to finish, with Lara being seconds behind. Kellie ended up finishing third, with Sarah finishing in fourth place. This meant that Leigh and Lara were the two finalists, guaranteeing a Westren would be immune this week. The final round was a simple head-on race - the last man or woman standing would win immunity, and the loser would be knocked out. Leigh was unable to complete the Sky Wall, leaving Lara with a much needed immunity for the week.

Week 10 - None: Due to makeover week, there was no contest in Week 10.

Week 11 - None: Due to the Sydney to Hobart challenge, there was no contest in Week 11.

Week 12 - None: Due to the return of the Eliminees and their challenge, there was no contest in Week 12.

Week 13 - The Tyre and Rope Supercontest: This is a three-round supercontest, with each round involving tyres or ropes. After each round, the top two would be safe, leaving two people to battle it out in the final round - the winner stays, the loser goes home. The first round was to flip an 80 kg tyre as many times as possible. Nathaniel and Leigh were saved, getting 13 and 12 flips respectively. In the second round, the remaining four had to transfer 26 tyres over a course of stairs and stack them. Emma and Kellie were the first two to complete this, and therefore safe. This left Sarah and Rebecca to go head to head again, only this time in a contest. They had to compete in a three-round tug-of-war - the first to win two rounds stayed in the competition. As before, Sarah stayed having defeated Rebecca in the first two rounds.

=== Major Challenges ===
Week 1 - The families had to work together to pull an 88 tonne train 400m. At the 200m mark, they had to load on an extra four suitcases of weight to their train and pull it a further 200m to the finish line. The first family to cross the line won a 4 kg extra weight loss at the weigh-in. This family was the Duncans, who achieved a hat-trick, winning the Contest, Challenge and the Weigh-in.

Week 2 - The families had to work together to climb the 60 steps of the ANZ Stadium 100 times - a total of 6,000 steps. The winning family gained an extra 2 kg off their weight loss. Sharlene of the Westrens and Nathaniel of the Challenors were ruled out due to injuries, and with only two members of their family cleared to compete, the Challenors as a team were ruled out and instead went to patch up family issues with Greg, the first eliminee of the season, who was from their family. As a result of Sharlene being ruled out, only three members of each team were allowed to compete, and the Moons and Duncans sat out Sarah and Sarah-Jayne respectively. The Challenge was won by the Duncans for the second week running.

Week 3 - The families had to work together to collect one tonne's worth of sand in sandbags which carried 10–15 kg each within them and run it across the parade ground to a scale. Due to uneven teams, Sharlene from the Westrens and Rebecca from the Moons sat out. The winning family won a 1 kg weight advantage and letters from home. For the third straight time, the Duncans won the challenge. The other families also got their letters from home via their trainers, as a reward (in the case of the Red and Blue teams) or following a strong workout (in the case of the Black team).

Week 4 - The teams were challenged with moving water bottles 50m along a field. The teams had to move 200 litres of water per person in their team on a sled proportional to the number of people in their team, so the Challenors had to move 400 litres and the super-family 2,200 litres. The winning family got 1 kg per person. If the Challenors won, they would get 2 kg added to their weight loss, due to Damien not being officially returned until after the weigh-in. If the super-family won, they would get 11 kg added to their weight loss. The Challenors narrowly won, and took an extra 2 kg into the weigh-in, without which, the super-family would have won.

Week 5 - The families were engaged in a four-way tug of war, with the aim being to collect as many flags as team members from their corner of a mud pit. After each flag is collected, the round ends and one member of the team who got a flag must unclip, making the load on the remaining members increase. The first family to collect their flags won a 1 kg weight advantage in the Weigh-In. Jodie from the Moons and Sharlene from the Westrens were ruled out because of injury, so their families only had to collect three flags each, as did the Challenors, with the Duncans only needing two flags to win. After seven rounds, in which all the families collected all but one of their flags each, it came down to a four-way battle between Meg, Leigh, Sarah and Damien for their final flags. In the end, Meg outlasted them all and won her and her twin the 1 kg advantage.

Week 6 - The families had to pick teams of three for this challenge, and one of the people had to be their loser legend. They had to fill buckets of water and run 250m up a sand dune. Each family team had six five-litre buckets and two ten-litre buckets at their disposal. The first team to fill their bucket at the top, float their key up a tube and unlock their flag won a 1 kg advantage at the weigh-in. The last team to arrive won a 1 kg disadvantage at the weigh-in. The Challenors came first, with the Westrens coming second, meaning that the race not to be last was between the Moons and the Duncans. Ultimately, the Moons "won" the 1 kg disadvantage for the second week running.

Week 7 - The families were previously warned of an impending surprise elimination, and after the contest, they were told that it would come at the challenge. Two members from each family were faced with an obstacle course whilst tied together. Due to Sharlene and Jodie being ruled out due to injury, as well as Meg being automatically immune, only three families competed, and the Moons and Challenors had to pick one person each to sit out, which was Sarah and Damien respectively. The family which was quickest to complete the course were allowed to choose one person from the losing family to be immediately eliminated. Due to their contest win, the Challenors had a minute knocked off their time. The Moon team consisting of Rebecca and Kellie finished in the slowest time, and the Westrens had to make the decision, choosing Jodie to be knocked out.

Week 8 - Part 1: Pyramid of Fitness - Following the announcement of the contestants becoming singles, the trainers took the contestants to a quarry, where eight rounds' worth of gym equipment were set up. Following each round, one contestant would be knocked out. In the first round, the contestants had to keep pace with the Commando's count and squatted, with the first person to lose count being knocked out, which was Sarah. In Round 2, the contestants took it in turns to lift a bar as many times in one minute, with the lowest count being knocked out, which was Sharlene. Round 3 was on Spin Bikes, being a 2 km sprint, and the last to finish would be out, and this was Damien. Round 4 was holding medicine balls above their heads, with the first to buckle being knocked out, which was Kellie. Round 5 was step-ups, with the least done in one minute being knocked out. Rebecca just lost out to Meg, and was knocked out. Round 6 used cross trainers, and the three longest distances covered in five minutes went through to Round 7. Meg was knocked out with a score of 1.06 km covered. Round 7 was on the rowing machines, with the first two to cover 1 km going through to the final round. Lara was knocked out due to exhaustion. The final round was an endurance competition, with the two finalists starting at 8 km/h, and every minute they lasted, the speed went up by 2 km/h. Joe gave up after just over two minutes, leaving Leigh as the Ultimate Athlete in this series of the Biggest Loser officially.

Week 8 - Part 2: Triathlon - First up was an 800m kayak race - the contestants had to kayak 200m to a buoy and back, doing this leg twice, with the top six moving on. The second round was a 10 km (20 lap) bike race, with the top three moving on. The final leg was a 100m car race, with the contestants having to build the 100m road that their car would move on, which was a jigsaw. The prize for the winner was to spend some time on Cockatoo Island with a loved one. Meg was first out of the water, with Leigh second, Lara third, Sarah fourth, Kellie fifth and Joe sixth. Sharlene was seventh, Rebecca eighth and Damien was last. In the bike race, Leigh was first, Joe was second and Lara was third. Meg was fourth, Sarah was fifth and Kellie was sixth. This meant that Leigh, Lara & Joe went through to the car race. The race was won by Lara when Leigh went on a go-slow in order to let Lara, the only person in the house who came without a close family member, see her mother.

Week 9 - As part of Immunity week, the final immunity was given out. It was a race to build a flag pole and raise a flag. First, to get the pieces they needed, they had to dig holes to get under various holes to get to the pieces which consisted of the pole itself, 4 sandbags and the flag pole stand. One all were collected, they had to head into the water past a marked buoy and swim 100 meters to the other end of the beach where there was a bucket containing their flag. They had to then swim back the same way and raise the flag. The challenge ended with Leigh winning the immunity, Kellie being second (by three seconds), Sarah third, Sharlene fourth and Rebecca last.

Week 10 - In a recreation of a challenge from The Biggest Loser: Couples 3, the remaining contestants had to climb a Jacob's Ladder above a pool until they were the last one standing. The trainers were hoping that they would take the world title off the Americans, who managed to last 2.5 hours. Sarah was the first to drop out, with Sharlene falling off just before the half-hour mark. Meg was the third to fall off when she couldn't hold on any longer, with Kellie falling off in fourth, and Lara falling off in fifth. This meant Joe and Leigh remained on the Jacob's ladder as the episode ended. In the next episode, Joe won the challenge and they broke the world record set by the Americans by one minute (according to Hayley). The record Joe set on the Jacob's Ladder is 3:24:44 (12284 feet).

Week 11: Super Challenge - Following the contestants docking in Hobart, Hayley announced of the super challenge to take place over multiple legs: kayak; climb, abseil, bike and run, ending with a knowledge test at the summit of Mount Wellington. Once there, contestants had to pick the lowest calorie dish off the table; the one left with the highest would be eliminated. Because Sharlene is unable to take part in the challenge due to injury, the last dish remaining would go to her. At the start of the race, contestants hit the wall next to each other. Eventually, the contestants managed to overcome the obstacle. After the kayak leg, Kellie was first followed by Sarah, Leigh and Meg. Joe was currently in last place after hitting the wall on the kayak and overturning his kayak. In the stair climb, Kellie retained her lead, but Leigh overtook Sarah to come in second. Sarah came third, Meg came fourth and Joe came fifth. In the abseil, Kellie and Leigh were too petrified to abseil despite leading the race and the Commando and Tiffiny encouraged them to abseil. As a result, Sarah, Meg and Joe all abseiled to be in first, second and third respectively. In the bike leg, Sarah was still in the lead coming into the run. Joe overtook Meg in the leg to be in second with Meg coming third. In the run, Joe caught up to Sarah and in the end, he came first in the super challenge and selected 5 large strawberries. Meg also overtook Sarah and was the second to finish. Meg chose tuna in springwater out of the five. Sarah came in third and took the orange juice (300ml). Leigh came in fourth and selected the 6 chicken nuggets. Kellie, coming in last had to choose between double brie cheese (110g) or salted macadamia nuts (100g). Whichever she didn't choose, Sharlene would take. She chose the brie, leaving Sharlene with the macadamia nuts. The contestants managed to take the items in calorific order, with the correct order being strawberries, tuna, orange juice, nuggets, brie and nuts, meaning Sharlene was eliminated.

Week 12 - First Elimination Challenge - The eliminated contestant from each original family with the highest weight loss will return for the chance to compete again, with the two people surviving the week returning to the game with another chance at the money. This challenge is the first elimination round, where one player will be sent straight back home. The four competing are Lara for the Westrens, Emma for the Duncans, Nathaniel for the Challenors and Rebecca for the Moons, having been the highest person on each team at the return weigh-in. The challenge is a three-round game, where each contestant starts with ten basketballs in an individual rack. The aim of the challenge was to fill their racks with balls from other people's racks. After ten minutes, whoever had the most balls in their rack won and got to stay in the game. This would continue until two people were left, in which case the winner stays and the loser goes home. The first round was won by Emma, with 14 balls in her rack. The second round was won by Rebecca, with 22 balls in her rack. This meant that the final round came down to Lara and Nathaniel, with the winner going through and the loser going home. At the end of the third round, Nathaniel beat out Lara, and stayed in the competition, sending her home.

Week 12: Yellow Line Challenge - Following the return of the eliminated contestants, the four fully-fledged contestants had immunity, leaving one place above the yellow line. However, Joe gained weight, putting him in danger and stripping him of his immunity. Emma was the biggest loser of the week, and Rebecca was second, meaning that Nathaniel and Joe faced off for the final place in the final week. This was decided by a three-round elimination challenge - whoever won two of the three rounds stayed. The first was to hold a 5 kg medicine ball above your head until either you or your opponent drops. After six minutes, Joe dropped, handing the victory to Nathaniel. In the second round, Joe and Nathaniel had to row 1000m in the shortest time - whoever got to 1000m first won the round.

Week 13: Train the Trainers Challenge - For one hour, the remaining contestants got the opportunity to train the trainers (first for the Commando and Tiffiny). After their training session, the contestants made a challenge for the trainers to determine who the fittest trainer. In round 1, the trainers had to do a 100m sack race and Michelle was last and eliminated (due to the fact she had to do cross trainers and treadmills). In the second round, it was a 100m egg and spoon race. Shannan's hand was shaking before the race even began and it cost him a place in the final round. The Commando ate his egg (including the shell). In the final round, trainers had gone around the pole 25 times and run 100m. Despite both the Commando and Tiffiny falling down and not running straight, the Commando won the challenge.

Week 13: Man vs Machine - The contestants (excluding Leigh but including Michelle) had to run a 5 km trek to the finish line as a team. At the same time, the Honda Civic Type R had to go through a 50 km course. The contestants had a five-second head start. In the end, the contestants finished their course and won. After the race, the contestants got to ride in the Honda Civic Type R. Leigh and Shannan sky dived 13000 ft due to Leigh's fear of heights.

=== Temptations ===
Week 1 - None

Week 2 - The families were sat at picnic tables and had to individually decide whether to play temptation, which involved ten different traditional picnic snacks hidden in picnic baskets, with calorific values up to and including 2,000 calories. One picnic basket contained A$25,000, which was for the winner to decide what to do with. Members from all teams bar the Challenors played, with Leigh from the Westrens, both Meg and Jarrod from the Duncans, and Jodie from the Moons being the ones playing. Leigh chose the correct basket and was presented with a choice - keep the A$25,000, which was from the Biggest-Losing family's prize money, and leave Camp Biggest Loser immediately, or leave the cash and stay on Camp. He chose to stay at Camp Biggest Loser.

Week 3 - Following the second elimination, the contestants entered the large gym, which was decked out as a Chinese buffet restaurant. The families had to decide whether to face a six-course Chinese meal, in order to be the last family standing and win the ultimate prize - family immunity. All of the teams except the Challenors played, with Sarah from the Moons being the first person to give up on a course, the sixth, which was Peking Duck. After six courses, Jarrod from the Duncans and Sharlene from the Westrens were left and had to eat a Chinese delicacy - two "thousand-year eggs" to win family immunity for their team. Sharlene was the one to stomach the delicacy and as a result, the Westrens won another week at Camp.

Week 4 - None due to vote for all vs one week.

Week 5 - The contestants played as individuals for this temptation. They entered the room to find photos of their loved ones, which represented half of the prize - a 24-hour visit home - as well as Immunity as an individual. They each had 20 minutes blindfolded in front of a bowl of chocolate buttons - the person who ate the most won both prizes for themselves. Two families, the Duncans and Challenors, did not eat at all in the 20 minutes. The only Westren who ate was Leigh, who ate only one chocolate button. The Moons, however, had three eaters - Sarah eating one, Jodie eating six and Kellie being the winner with an impressive 118 chocolates eaten. As a result, she was the one who returned home for 24 hours and was safe at the weigh-in for Week 5.

Week 6 - There was no temptation for the week, due to the Biggest Loser Legends coming to the house for the week.

Week 7 - The contestants were presented with eleven fridge-freezers, each containing one treat ranging from 50 cal (Jelly) to 1000 cal (Banana Split). All the fridges contained a treat, and once a contestant had eaten their treat, they could open the freezer to see if immunity was hidden inside it. Each contestant was given a paddle with "play" on one side and "pass" on the other. If no-one played, Nathaniel would keep immunity as the previous holder, having been assigned it by Sam in Week 6. Only Nathaniel and Meg played, with Meg's first fridge containing the maximum 1000 cal treat. Nathaniel managed to get a 242 cal ice cream cone in his first fridge, with neither finding immunity in their freezers. Nathaniel found a 71 cal yogurt in his second fridge which also did not contain immunity. Meg's second fridge contained a Black Forest Cake worth 750 cal, and she found the immunity in her freezer, which saved her from the week's double elimination.

Week 8 - The contestants were faced with fifty boxes - forty-eight of which contained foods ranging from 50 cal to 750 cal, and two of which contained immunity tickets. If a contestant matched two foods, they could pick an opponent to have to eat the food. If they mismatched two boxes, they had to eat a 100 cal. chocolate chip cookie. When a contestant matched the two immunity tickets, they would win the immunity. The only person to play was Sarah, and as a result, she just had to match boxes to remove them from her choices, and improve her chances of winning immunity. Finally, after eating thirteen cookies, she found one of the immunity tickets, but was struggling to find the remaining one. After eating twenty cookies, she finally found both the immunity tickets and was safe for the week.

Week 9 - The contestants were faced with a 24-hour lockdown in a large room, with food being brought in every hour, ranging from a sausage roll worth 75 calories to pancakes worth over 800. The person who eats the most calories in 24 hours gets the first immunity of the week, as it is immunity week. After seven hours, the contestants were given the option to leave the room, and forgo the chance at this immunity, and everyone bar Meg, Joe & Lara did so. At the end of the 24 hours, Meg claimed the immunity, eating nearly 5,000 calories to do so.

Week 10 - The contestants had the opportunity to win immunity by eating little or much ice cream. The contestant who consumes the most calories will win immunity. However, each contestant will walk to the ice cream truck alone, meaning no body will know who took temptation or much the others ate until the end of temptation. If no one played temptation, Meg would win immunity for having immunity at last week's temptation. In the end, the remaining two males Leigh and Joe played immunity. Both ate two sundaes, but Leigh had a waffle cone and Joe had a chocolate coated ice cream cone which was enough for the latter to win immunity by 260 calories.

Week 11 - There was no temptation due to the contestants sailing from Sydney to Hobart.

Week 12 - There was no temptation due to the return of the eliminated contestants. In addition, Hayley told the remaining four contestants they all have immunity for the week without any catch. This is the second time that four immunities were granted in a week.

Week 13 - There was no temptation due to it being the final week.

=== Eliminations ===
In weeks 1–7, after the weigh-in, the families below the yellow line select one of their own team to face elimination. Those above the yellow have the final say in which of the two goes home. In week 4, the "3 Families vs. 1 Family" week, the winning team got to decide which member of the other team was eliminated. From week 8 onwards (excluding week 12), two people fall below the yellow line and everyone else votes. In week 12, a challenge decided who of the bottom two went home.

- Week 1 - Greg (4-0): The families had to choose between Greg and Rebecca. The first four people to vote - Craig, Jarrod, Sarah-Jayne and Sharlene all voted for Greg, sending him home with four votes left unrevealed.
- Week 2 - Sarah-Jayne (4-0): After the weigh-in, the Westrens originally put Sharlene up for elimination. Just as Hayley was about to leave the weigh-in room, Craig told her that Sharlene's nomination was a mistake and he was supposed to be up for elimination. Hayley decided to ask the Duncans if they would allow the change to happen and this was approved off air. As with the previous week, the first four people (in this case, Jodie, Joe, Nathaniel and Rebecca) all voted for Sarah-Jayne over Craig, sending her home.
- Week 3 - Damien (4-0): The Challenors, in particular Joe, decided to put Damien in the chopping block as a tactic to keep him in the game as the heaviest contestant. However, the Westrens and Duncans saw through the tactic to keep him in the game over the smallest contestant Jodie from the Moon family, also up for elimination. Lara even questioned the Challenors' choice and stated that they shouldn't play Russian Roulette on people's lives. In the end, Damien was voted off unanimously. After elimination, all the families ganged up on Joe as they all believed he should have put himself up for elimination as both Damien and Nathaniel needed it more than he and for making the call to put Damien up for elimination.
- Week 4 - Jarrod (1-0): The Challenors won the all-against-one weigh-in against the team of the Westrens, Duncans and Moons. For winning the weigh-in, the Challenors were allowed to vote off any lone contestant of their choice. Despite both Joe and Nathaniel considering everyone a threat in the competition, they voted off Jarrod as they considered him to be the biggest threat in the game.
- Week 5 - Craig (3-2): The Duncans both voted for Jodie to leave, due to their friendship with the Westrens. However, the three Challenors held the casting votes, and all voted for Craig, sending him home.
- Week 6 - Emma (3-3): During the weigh-in, drama ensued when Jodie claimed that Sarah wasn't focused in losing her weight and for consistently sleeping in. Sarah defended herself by telling Jodie that she is in fact consistently losing five kilos a week. This led to the Moon family leaving in the middle of weigh-in, the first time this has ever happened on Australia's Biggest Loser. As for the Duncan family, after finding out they were up for elimination, Emma and Meg knew if one of them were to be eliminated, their team would be reduced to one final member. As a result, instead of having a minute to discuss who should be up for elimination, Hayley gave both the Moons and the Duncans an hour to decide. The Moons chose Jodie to be up for elimination, knowing that if a hung vote occurred, she'd be safe as both Meg and Emma had a smaller percentage weight loss than she. Emma decided to put herself forward for elimination, knowing she had a better homestyle, access to a gym and family support compared to Meg, who lives on a farm and wouldn't have easy access to a gym. In the vote, the Westren members voted for Jodie for strategic reasons, believing the Moons to be a threat in the end game and wanting to level the playing field. The Challenor members likewise voted for strategic reasons but gave their votes to Emma, the result of which is that they were left leading. During the vote, Jodie was shocked at Lara for voting her to leave because, as she claimed, on the previous night, Lara had said that she "had her back" and promised not to vote her off. Lara denied that the promise had ever occurred.
- Week 7: Challenge - Jodie: For winning the obstacle course challenge, the Westrens had the right to vote off a member from the last-place team. The Moon family came in last and one of them faced certain elimination for the first time. Lara couldn't decide whom to nominate and Leigh believed that Sarah was a threat with more weight to lose. In the end, it was Sharlene who decided as a family to vote off Jodie as they believed she can lose the remaining weight outside as she didn't have too much more weight to lose.
- Week 7: Nathaniel (2-1): After the weigh-in, the Westrens managed to survive elimination by 0.04% (200 grams). As a result, the Moons and the Challenors were up for elimination. In the Moon family, Kellie nominated herself for elimination to fill Jodie's shoes, as she was consistently the one to be nominated. For the Challenors, the uncles decided to nominate Nathaniel based on the fact that he had the lowest weight loss percentage in their family. Nathaniel was vastly upset about their reasoning, seeing it as a betrayal, and left the weigh-in room, only later to return to the Moon family's side, claiming them to be a better family than his uncles. At elimination, both Lara and Sharlene voted for Nathaniel, doing this because they believed Joe or Damien should have been nominated and thus basing their decision as one of revenge against the two. Meg voted for Kellie because she believed Nathaniel needed to be here more than her.
- Week 8: Damien (4-3): The contestants voted on family lines, with the Westrens and Meg voting out Damien and the Moons and Joe voting out Lara. However, Sarah bucked this trend when she voted strategically, sending Damien home.
- Week 9: Rebecca (4-2): The contestants had to choose between two Moons: Rebecca and Sarah. The Westrens all voted to save Sarah as she had more weight than Rebecca to lose. Joe and Kellie both voted for Sarah as she has a stronger support system at home whereas Rebecca would have to care for her family leaving her without much free time. Ultimately though, Meg decided to send Rebecca home in order to let Sarah "get below 100 [kilograms] like I did", however Sarah didn't manage to get under the 100 kg mark throughout the whole game.
- Week 10: Lara (3-2): During the weigh-in, for winning the major challenge, Joe gave his 1 kg advantage to Kellie, where Joe believed he did enough to secure his immunity. Joe ended up being the week's biggest loser and Meg and Lara were below the yellow line. Should Joe have not given his weight advantage to Kellie, she would have been below the yellow line instead of Meg. Sharlene wanted to replace Lara and be up for elimination. However Lara said she was the one who binged and had to take responsibility for her actions. In what the contestants all agreed was the hardest decision to date, Lara and Meg faced elimination. Due to the nature of the elimination, too, this was perhaps the most intimate elimination to date, with those up for elimination genuinely being resolved to their votes to be sent home. The Westrens both voted to send Meg home, naturally to save Lara, which was an expected outcome. Joe and Kellie, however, selected Lara. The most concise voting strategy came from Sarah who held the deciding vote, choosing Lara based on the fact that - and providing a noble parting speech to boost Lara's self-worth - that she had consistently outshone all the others, exceeded everyone's expectations and was best placed to succeed outside. Sharlene's reaction was perhaps the most upsetting yet seen in an elimination, markedly upset at Lara's elimination, and Hayley herself remarked that she was going to miss Lara. Ultimately, this elimination went very well without animosity and Lara accepted it the best and most forthright yet seen.
- Week 11: Super Challenge - Sharlene: The contestant who picks the food with the highest amount of calories will be eliminated. The options are (in no order): 1 cup of orange juice, 6 chicken nuggets, 5 large strawberries, macadamia nuts, brie cheese or tin of tuna. Sharlene was left with the nuts and sent home.
- Week 11: Meg (2-1): Kellie voted for Meg due to family ties, Leigh voted for Sarah due to friendship with Meg and ultimately, Joe broke the tie, voting for Meg due to strategy.
- Week 12: Challenge - Lara: After being brought back, Lara was re-eliminated for failing to beat any of the other returnees in the challenge.
- Week 12: Challenge - Joe: After gaining weight, Joe lost the first two rounds against Nathaniel in an elimination challenge. This made him eliminated as Nathaniel had won two out of three rounds in the challenge.
- Week 13: Contest - Rebecca: After two rounds in the final contest, Rebecca and Sarah were the final two contestants fighting to avoid elimination. It was a tug-o-war contest and the first player to win two bouts survived elimination. Sarah won the first two bouts and as a result, Rebecca was eliminated.
- Week 13: Nathaniel (2-1): Nathaniel was voted off as the bigger threat over Sarah. Leigh voted for Sarah in order to attempt to have one representative from each family in the final four, but Kellie protected her family member, and Emma voted off Nathaniel as the bigger threat.

Contestant	Wk 1	Wk 2	Wk 3	Wk 4	Wk 5	Wk 6	Wk 7	Wk 8	Wk 9	Wk 10	Wk 11	Wk 12	Wk 13
Eliminated	Greg	Sarah-Jayne	Damien	Jarrod	Craig	Emma	Jodie, Nathaniel	Damien	Rebecca	Lara	Sharlene, Meg	Lara, Joe	Rebecca, Nathaniel
Emma	?	X	Damien	X	Jodie	X	Eliminated Wk 6					X	Nathaniel
Leigh	?	X	Damien	X	X	Jodie	?	Damien	Rebecca	Meg	Sarah	X	Sarah
Kellie	X	?	X	X	X	X	X	Lara	Sarah	Lara	Meg	X	Nathaniel
Sarah	X	?	X	X	X	X	X	Damien	X	Lara	X	X	X
Nathaniel	X	Sarah-Jayne	X	X	Craig	Emma	X	Eliminated Wk 7				X	Eliminated Wk 13
Rebecca	X	Sarah-Jayne	X	X	X	X	X	Lara	X	Eliminated Wk 9		X	Eliminated Wk 13 via Challenge Penalty
Joe	X	Sarah-Jayne	X	Jarrod	Craig	Emma	X	Lara	Sarah	Lara	Meg	X	Eliminated Wk 12 via Challenge Penalty
Lara	?	X	Damien	X	X	Jodie	Nathaniel	X	Rebecca	X	Eliminated Wk 10	X	Eliminated Wk 12 via Challenge Penalty
Meg	?	X	?	X	Jodie	X	Kellie	Damien	Rebecca	X	X	Eliminated Wk 11	
Sharlene	Greg	X	?	X	X	Jodie	Nathaniel	Damien	Rebecca	Meg	X	Eliminated Wk 11 via Challenge Penalty	
Damien	X	?	X	X	Craig	Emma	X	X	Eliminated Wk 8				
Jodie	X	Sarah-Jayne	X	X	X	X	X	Eliminated Wk 7 via Challenge Penalty					
Craig	Greg	X	?	X	X	Eliminated Wk 5							
Jarrod	Greg	X	Damien	X	Eliminated Wk 4								
Sarah-Jayne	Greg	X	Eliminated Wk 2										
Greg	X	Eliminated Wk 1											

Immunity
X Immunity, not allowed to vote
X Below yellow line, not allowed to vote
? Vote not revealed (hidden vote)
Returned to the competition
Eliminated or not in house
Valid vote cast
Winner ($100,000)

=== The Final Four Weigh In ===
Contestant	Start weight	Finale	Lost	percentage	Goal weight	Goal difference
Emma	133.9	71.8	62.1	46.38%	69.0	2.8
Leigh	130.1	72.4	57.7	44.38%	85.0	-12.6
Kellie	127.7	78.5	49.2	38.53%	69.0	9.5
Sarah	150.5	100.7	49.8	33.09%	74.0	26.7

Sarah weighed in first, with a percentage of 33.09%. Despite making it to the final four, she lost one of the lower percentages of the night, and came in fourth. Kellie was third, with 38.53%, and Leigh second with 44.38%, close to the winner, Emma's 62.1 kg shed and 46.38% to become the second female biggest Loser.

== Notes ==
After the finale of this season of The Biggest Loser, Leigh and Lara from the Westren Family split.
