= The Biggest Loser (disambiguation) =

The Biggest Loser a reality TV series

- The Biggest Loser - List of the various The Biggest Loser programs created in different countries and languages
- The Biggest Loser Asia
  - The Biggest Loser Asia (season 1)
  - The Biggest Loser Asia (season 2)
- The Biggest Winner Arabic version of the reality TV series
- The Biggest Loser (Australian TV series)
- The Biggest Loser Germany
- Biggest Loser Jeetega India's version of the reality TV series in the Hindi language
- The Biggest Loser (Netherlands TV series)
- The Biggest Loser Pinoy Edition Philippines version of reality TV series
  - The Biggest Loser Pinoy Edition (season 1)
  - The Biggest Loser Pinoy Edition: Doubles (season 2)
- Marele câștigător Romania's version of reality TV series
- The Biggest Loser South Africa
- The Biggest Loser (British TV series)
- The Biggest Loser (American TV series)
  - The Biggest Loser (season 1)
  - The Biggest Loser (season 2)
  - The Biggest Loser (season 3)
  - The Biggest Loser (season 4)
  - The Biggest Loser (season 5)
  - The Biggest Loser (season 6)
  - The Biggest Loser: Couples 2 - season 7
  - The Biggest Loser: Second Chances - season 8
  - The Biggest Loser: Couples 3 - season 9
  - The Biggest Loser: Pay It Forward - season 10
  - The Biggest Loser: Couples 4 - season 11
  - The Biggest Loser: Battle of the Ages - season 12
  - The Biggest Loser: No Excuses - season 13
  - The Biggest Loser: Challenge America - season 14
