= The Biggest Loser =

Reality television franchise

- Created by: Ben Silverman; Mark Koops; Dave Broome; J. D. Roth
- Original work: The Biggest Loser (United States)
- Owner: Banijay Entertainment
- Years: 2004–present

The Biggest Loser is a reality television format which started with the American TV show The Biggest Loser in 2004. The show centers on overweight and obese contestants attempting to lose the most weight; the winner receives a cash prize. There are different variations of The Biggest Loser around the world. Each country has made its own adaptation of the show; however, the contestants always have the same goal: to lose the highest percentage of weight (or most weight) to become the "biggest loser". There is no minimum or maximum weight limit for the show, but most males tend to weigh over or near 300 lb (136 kg). Females tend to weigh over or near 200 lb (91 kg).

In addition to individual contestants, some seasons in some international adaptations have featured couples or even whole families.

== International versions ==
Franchise with a currently airing season
Franchise with an upcoming season
Franchise whose status is unknown
Franchise no longer in production

Country/Region	Title	Television network	Winners	Presenters	Trainers
Algeria	The Winning Weight–الوزن الرابح	Samira TV	Season 1, 2019: Walid; Season 2, 2021–22: Rabah & Habiba; Season 3, 2025–26: TBA	Salima Souakri	Azzdine (season 1); Samir Benaissa (season 2–3)
Argentina	Cuestión de peso Matter of weight	Canal 13	Season 1, 2006: Maximiliano Oliva; Season 2, 2007: Amadeo; Season 3, 2008: Marcela; Season 4, 2010: Gabriel; Season 5, 2012: Gastón Villegas; Season 6, 2013: Micaela Belén Rutti; Season 7, 2017: TBA	Andrea Politti (1-4); Claribel Medina (5-6); Fabián Doman (7-); Lucía Rubio (7-)	Sergio Verón (1-)
Asia	The Biggest Loser Asia	Diva Universal	Season 1, 2009: David Gurnani; Season 2, 2010: Raj Devaraj	Sarimah Ibrahim (1); Marion Caunter (2)	Kristy Curtis; Dave Nuku
Arab world	الرابح الأكبر; Ar-Rabeh Al-Akabar; The Biggest Winner	MBC 1	Season 1, 2006: Abdullah Hammad; Season 2, 2007: Walead hemayed; Season 3, 2008: Mohammad Mazboudi; Season 4, 2009: Karim Abdullah	Carolina de Oliveira	Noor Khatab (3–4); Lina Rahma (3–4); Patci Saliba (2); Hani Abu Al-Naja (1–2); Zaina Habi (1)
Australia	The Biggest Loser	Network Ten	Season 1, 2006: Adro Sarnelli; Season 2, 2007: Chris Garling; Season 3, 2008: Sam Rouen; Season 4, 2009: Bob Herdsman; Season 5, 2010: Lisa Hose; Season 6, 2011: Emma Duncan; Season 7, 2012: Margie Cummins; Season 8, 2013: Katie & Robyn Dyke; Season 9, 2014: Craig Booby; Season 10, 2015: Daniel Jofre; Season 11, 2017: Brett Smith and Lynton Dalla Rosa	Ajay Rochester (1-4); Hayley Lewis (5-9); Fiona Falkiner (10–11)	Bob Harper (1-3); Jillian Michaels (1-3); Michelle Bridges (2-10); Shannan Ponton (2-); Steve Willis (4-10); Emma Hutton (4); Tiffiny Hall (6-7, 10); Libby Labet (11-)
Brazil	O Grande Perdedor; The Biggest Loser	SBT	Season 1, 2005: Andreia Dutra	Silvio Santos	Alexandre Viotti; Melina Pardo
Brazil	Quem Perde Ganha; Who Loses Wins	SBT	Season 2, 2007: Reginaldo de Souza	Lígia Mendes	Marcelo Piacentini; Patricia Beires
Brunei	The Biggest Loser	BNC	Season 1, 2010: Ahmad Ali Azizul; Season 2, 2011: Muhammad Zahin; Season 3, 2012: Nurul Hannah; Season 4, 2013: ?	Current; Sarah Rahman (3); Former; Stacy Sandra (1-2); Emma Pangiran Raden (1)	Rudy Salleh; Arifin Yahya; Cristine Phoebe; Ezuan Aziz; Juliana Mikael
Bulgaria	Живот на кантар Zhivot na kantar Life on the Scales	bTV	Season 1, 2025: Anna Sapundzhieva	Nansi Karaboycheva	Ivan Georgiev; Radoslava Todorova (1еp11–1ep28); Anita Markova (1еp1–1ep10)
China	The Biggest Loser: 超级减肥王 (2013); The Biggest Loser: Super Diet King; The Biggest Loser: 减出我人生 (2015- )	CCTV-2 (1); Jiangsu TV (2–)	Season 1, 2013: Zu Jiaze (祖嘉泽); Season 2, 2015-2016: Zhan Changrong (詹昌荣); Season 3, 2017: Shi Guibin; Season 4, 2018: ?	Current; Wang Jue (3); Will Liu (3-); Zu Jiaze (2-); Former; Lola Xie (1); Zhu Dan (2)	Current; Elaine Zhang (3-); Kai Zhang (3-); Gao Chilin (3-); Former; Xinyu Zheng (1-2); Will Liu (1-2)
Croatia	Život na vagi Life on the Scales	RTL Televizija	Season 1, 2017: Ivan Krolo; Season 2, 2017: Dorian Crnković; Season 3, 2018: Alen Abramović; Season 4, 2019: Robert Baković; Season 5, 2020: Matej Petrović; Season 6, 2022: Josip Čapo; Season 7, 2023: Mislav Šepić; Season 8, 2024: Alina Pantseyeva; Season 9, 2025: Dominik Šarić	Current; Antonija Blaće (9–); Former; Marijana Batinić (1-4, 6-8); Sanja Žuljević (5)	Current; Edin Mehmedović (4–); Mirna Čužić (7–); Former; Mario Mlinarić (1-3); Sanja Žuljević (1-3); Maja Ćustić (4-6)
Finland	Suurin pudottaja Biggest Loser	MTV3	Season 1, 2006: Hardy Dieter; Season 2, 2007: Virpi Heikkilä; Season 3, 2009: Kaisu Romppainen; Season 4, 2014: Teemu ?	Eeva Jaakonmaa; Sini Rantanen; Heidi Suomi; Lola Wallinkoski	Jani Sievinen (1-3); Eva Wahlström (1-3); Mikko Nummenmaa (4); Jenni Levävaara (4)
Finland	Suurin pudottaja Suomi	Nelonen	Season 1, 2019: Nina Mikkonen; Season 2, 2020: Aarni Mikkola; Season 3, 2022: Suvi Hakasalo	Anni Hautala (3); Riku Nieminen (1-2)	Janni Hussi (1-3); Jari Sorsa (3); Aki Manninen (1-2)
Germany	The Biggest Loser	ProSieben	Season 1, 2009: Enrico Proba	Katarina Witt (1)	Nele Sehrt (1); Wojtek Vetter (1)
Germany	The Biggest Loser	kabel eins	Season 2, 2010: Heino Herrmann; Season 3, 2011: Carlo Werner	Regina Halmich (2-3)	Andreas Büdeker (2-3); Silke Kayadelen (2-3)
Germany	The Biggest Loser	Sat.1	Season 4, 2012: Jack Handl; Season 5, 2013: Paride Loreto; Season 6, 2014: Marc Haile; Season 7, 2015: Stefan Pries; Season 8, 2016: Ali Shoshak; Season 9, 2017: Alexandra Gregus; Season 10, 2018: Saki; Season 11, 2019: Mario Pohl; Season 12, 2020: Daniel; Season 13, 2021: Ole; Season 14, 2022: Patrick; Season 15, 2023: Valentina; Season 16, 2024: Giulio Arancio	Christine Theiss (4-)	Bineta Coulibaly (4); Nunzio Esposito (4); Silke Kayadelen (5-6); Ramin Abtin (5-); Detlef Soost (7); Mareike Spaleck (8-11); Petra Arvela (12-)
Germany	The Biggest Loser Teens (Teenager-Version)	Sat.1	Season 1, 2014: Erfan Khorasani	Christine Theiss (1)	Silke Kayadelen (1); Ramin Abtin (1); Detlef D! Soost (1)
Germany	The Biggest Loser – Power Couples	Sat.1	Season 1, 2021: Lucas and Manni	Christine Theiss	Ramin Abtin; Hassina Bahlol-Schröer
Hungary	A Nagy Fogyás; A Great Loss	TV2	Season 1, 2007: István Ferencsik	Gabriella Jakupcsek	Norbert Schobert; Alexandra Béres
Iceland	Biggest Loser Ísland	SkjárEinn	Season 1, 2014: Jóhanna Elísa Engelhartsdóttir; Season 2, 2015: Stefán Sverrisson; Season 3, 2016: Agla Steinunn Bjarnþórudóttir; Season 4, 2017: Ólafía Kristín Norðfjörð	Inga Lind Karlsdóttir	Gurrý Torfadóttur; Evert Víglundsson
India	Biggest Loser Jeetega	Sahara One	Season 1, 2007: Sandeep Sachdev	Suniel Shetty	Deepika Mehta; Yusef Khan
Israel	לרדת בגדול; Laredet Begadol; Losing Big Time	Channel 10	Season 1, 2006: Limor Hazaz; Season 2, 2007: Tsvika Hilf; Season 3, 2008: Avi Koriat; Season 4, 2011: Karen Glasner	Tzipi Shavit; Michal Yannai	Nadav Meirson; Or-ly Hoffman Bar; Tse'ela Evroni; Barak Tzur
Jordan	Al-Semina السمينة	Jordan Channel One	Unknown	Abdallah Al-Khawaldeh	Mohamed Al-Shakhriti; Moath Al-Shawarbeh
Latvia	XXL	TV3 Latvia	Season 1, 2008: Karl Ventaskrasts	Zane Vaļicka	Raivis Vidzis; Aivars Vysotsky
Mexico	¿Cuánto quieres perder? How Much Do You Want to Lose?	Televisa	Season 1, 2008: Ignacio Mestas	Galilea Montijo	Unknown
Netherlands	De Afvallers; The Slimmers	SBS 6	Season 1, 2005: Daan & Irma Steenkamp with kids; Season 2, 2006: Bert & Grietje Bakker with kids; Season 3, 2006: Marco & Suzy Niels van Boxtel; Season 4, 2007: Mark Dakriet; Season 5, 2007: Nijmeijers Family; Season 6, 2011: Unknown	Marlayne Sahupala	Current; Yneke Vocking (1–); Imro Beuk (1–); Hein Vergeer (5–); Former; Barbara de Loor (3–4); Gianni Romme (3); Mo Achahboun (1–2); Lenny Versteegden (1); Jessica Gal (1); Sandra van de Kamp (2)
Netherlands	The Biggest Loser Holland	SBS 6	Season 1, 2013: Unknown	Marlayne Sahupala	Sandra van de Kamp; Arjuna Lakner
Norway	The Biggest Loser Norge	TVNorge	Season 2, 2015: Lars Dahlum Johansen; Season 3, 2016: Unknown	Henriette Bruusgaard	Tonje Jenssen; Adrian Paul
Paraguay	Cuestión de peso Matter of weight	Latele	Unknown	Karina Doldán (1-7)	Gigi Díaz (IFBB PRO) (6-7)
Peru	Dale con ganas Give It All You've Got	Univision	Season 1, 2012: Dieter Goldschmidt	Alfonso de Anda	Luis Alberto Aracena; Marcelo Crudele; Maria Simon; Oscar Luna
Philippines	The Biggest Loser Pinoy Edition	ABS-CBN	Season 1, 2011: Larry Martin; Season 2, 2014: Bryan Castillo	Sharon Cuneta (1); Derek Ramsay (1); Iza Calzado (2); Matteo Guidicelli (2); Robi Domingo (2)	Jim Saret (1-2); Chinggay Andrada (1); Toni Saret (2)
Poland	Co Masz Do Stracenia? What Do You Have To Lose?	TV Puls	Season 1, 2008: Jaroslaw	Małgorzata Ostrowska-Królikowska	Unknown
Portugal	Peso Pesado; Heavyweight	SIC	Season 1, 2011: Fábio Neves; Season 2, 2011: Marco André; Season 3, 2015: João Manuel	Current; Bárbara Guimarães (2–); Former; Júlia Pinheiro (1)	Current; Joana Mota(3); Mauro Policarpo(3); Pedro Correia(3); Former; Rui Barros (1-2); Conceição Gonçalves (2); Sara Freitas (1)
Puerto Rico	Transformación total Total Transformation	WAPA-TV	Season 1, 2010: Vivian V. Rodríguez; Season 2, 2011: Ángel "Joel" Díaz	Zuleyka Rivera	Unknown
Romania	Marele câștigător The Big Winner	Antena 1	Season 1, 2010: Grațian Stan	Daiana Anghel	Florin Uceanu; Cori Gramescu
Russia	Взвешенные люди / Взвешенные и счастливые люди (4); Vzveshenniye lyudi / Vzveshenniye i schastlivye lyudi (4); The Weighted People / The Weighted and Happy People	STS	Season 1, 2015: Pyotr Vasilyev; Season 2, 2016: Timur Bikbulatov; Season 3, 2017: Boris Baburov; Season 4, 2018: Anton Avduevsky	Yulia Kovalchuk (1-3); Anfisa Chekhova (4)	Irina Turchinskaya (1-3); Denis Semenihin (1-3); Sergey Parkhomenko (4); Natalia Lugovskikh (4); Sergey Badyuk (4)
Scandinavia	Biggest Loser	Kanal 5	Season 1, 2005: Rooy Rodriguez Ramirez	Martin Björk	Pauline Nordin
Serbia; Bosnia and Herzegovina	Najveći gubitnik The Biggest Loser	Nova S Nova BH	Season 1, 2023: Aleksandar Stevanović; Season 2, 2023: Dijana Konstantinović	Hristina Popović (Season 1); Danijela Buzurović (Season 2)	Stefan Nevistić; Maša Kuprešanin
Slovakia	Super Telo	STV	Season 1, 2006: Ján Mäsiar	Iveta Malachovská	Unknown
Slovakia	Najväčší víťaz The Biggest Winner	TV Markiza	Season 1, 2018: Július Lavo	Monika Zázrivcová	Janyho Landla; Soňa Sedláčková
Slovenia	Življenje na tehtnici Life On The Scales (4); The Biggest Loser Slovenija(1-3)	Planet TV	Season 1, 2017: Bojan Papež; Season 2, 2018: Klara Hrovat Vidmar; Season 3, 2019: Cristian Baranašič; Season 4, 2024: Anže Javšovec; Season 5, 2026: Current season	Current; Klemen Bučan (4–); Former; Špela Grošelj (1,3); Marko Potrč (2)	Current; Andrej Pavličević (5–); Valerija Slapnik (5–); Former; Nives Orešnik (4); Andrej Milutinovič (4); Nataša Gorenc (1-3); Jan Kovačič (1-3)
South Africa	The Biggest Loser South Africa	E.tv	Season 1, 2008: Sharon Haarhoff	Jasmyn Asvat	Unknown
Spain	La báscula The Scale	Canal Sur	Season 1, 2013: Unknown; Season 2, 2014: Unknown; Season 3, 2015: Rafael Cintado	Enrique Sánchez	Unknown
Spain	La báscula The Scale	Aragón TV	Season 1, 2015: Unknown	Luis Larrodera	Unknown
Sweden	Biggest Loser Sverige; Biggest Loser Sweden	TV4	Season 2, 2010: Karl Fredrik Jonsson; Season 3, 2012: Ralph Nicolaisen	Jessica Almenäs	Current; Sabina Dalfjäll (7-); Mikael Hollsten (5-); Former; Mårten Nylén (1-4); Tanja Djelevic (1, 3); Olga Rönnberg (2); Sabina Dufberg (4-6)
Sweden	Biggest Loser Sverige; Biggest Loser Sweden	Sjuan	Season 4, 2013: Simon Kachoa; Season 5, 2014: Hristos Adoniadis; Season 6, 2015: Robert Sander; Season 7, 2016: Sandra Wikström; Season 8, 2017: Michael Fridebäck; VIP 1, 2017: Anna Book; Season 9, 2018: Viktor Knutsson; VIP 2, 2018: Erik Hörstadius; Season 10, 2019: Malin Öström; Season 11, 2020: Mona Eriksson; Season 12, 2023: Filip Sehlstedt	Current Anna Brolin (6-) Former Kristin Kaspersen (3-5)	Current; Sabina Dalfjäll (7-); Mikael Hollsten (5-); Former; Mårten Nylén (1-4); Tanja Djelevic (1, 3); Olga Rönnberg (2); Sabina Dufberg (4-6)
Thailand	The Biggest Loser ลดน้ําหนักกระหึ่ม	Channel 7			
Turkey	Yeni Bir Hayat; New Life	Star TV	Season 1, 2012: Hakan Aktürk	Ebru Akel	Figen Yorgancıoğlu; Ufuk Sönmez
Ukraine	Зважені та щасливі Zvazheni ta schaslyvi Weighted and Happy	STB	Season 1, 2011: Mykola Voroshnov; Season 2, 2012: Alik Zakrevskyy; Season 3, 2013: Maryna Vdovenko; Season 4, 2014: Yuliya Fomina; Season 5, 2015: Oleksandr Repyanchuk; Season 6, 2016: Arkadiy Vasylyshyn; Season 7, 2017: Nataliya Tokaryeva and Oleksiy Dobryanskyy; Season 8, 2018: Bohdan and Oleh Buryak; Season 9, 2019: Nataliya Kyrylenko and Pavlo Nazarenko; Season 10, 2025: Viacheslav Hrabovyi; Season 11, 2026: Current season	Current; Daniel Salem (10-); Former; Lyubava Greshnova (1); Olesya Zhurakivs'ka (2-5); Yana Solomko (6); Anita Lutsenko (7,9); Myroslava Ulyanina (8)	Current; Maryna Borzhems'ka-Uzelkova (6-); Oleksii Novikov (10-); Former; Anita Lutsenko (1-5); Igor Obukhovs'kyy (1-5); Vyacheslav Uzelkov† (4-8); Vasyl Virastyuk (8); Irakli Makatsaria (9)
United Kingdom & Ireland	The Biggest Loser	Living TV	Series 1, 2005: Aaron Howlett; Series 2, 2006: Jodie Prenger	Vicki Butler-Henderson	Angie Dowds; Mark Bailey
United Kingdom & Ireland	The Biggest Loser	ITV	Series 3, 2009: Kevin Sage; Series 4, 2011: Will Graham; Series 5, 2012: Kevin McLernon	Davina McCall (4–5); Kate Garraway (3)	Charlotte Ord (5); Rob Edmond (5); Richard Callender (3–5); Angie Dowds (3–4)
United States	The Biggest Loser	NBC (2004–2016); USA Network (2020)	Season 1, 2004: Ryan Benson; Season 2, 2005: Matt Hoover; Season 3, 2006: Erik Chopin; Season 4, 2007: Bill Germanakos; Season 5, 2008: Ali Vincent; Season 6, 2008: Michelle Aguilar; Season 7, 2009: Helen Phillips; Season 8, 2009: Danny Cahill; Season 9, 2010: Michael Ventrella; Season 10, 2010: Patrick House; Season 11, 2011: Olivia Ward; Season 12, 2011: John Rhode; Season 13, 2012: Jeremy Britt; Season 14, 2013: Danni Allen; Season 15, 2014: Rachel Frederickson; Season 16, 2015: Toma Dobrosavljevic; Season 17, 2016: Roberto Hernández; Season 18, 2020: Jim DiBattista	Current; Bob Harper (17-present); Former; Caroline Rhea (1–3); Alison Sweeney (4-16)	Former; Dolvett Quince (12-17); Jennifer Widerstrom (16-17); Jessie Pavelka (16); Anna Kournikova (12); Brett Hoebel (11); Cara Castronuova (11); Kim Lyons (3-4); Jillian Michaels (1-2, 4-11, 14-15); Bob Harper (1-16)

== Biggest Loser records ==
Heaviest contestant

- Male: Kevin Moore of The Biggest Loser Australia: The Next Generation and The Biggest Loser Australia: Challenge Australia The Biggest Loser Australia 9, weighed 254.7 kilograms (562 lb).
- Female: Shay Sorrells of The Biggest Loser Second Chances (U.S.) weighed 476 pounds (216 kg).

Biggest weight loss

- Male: Alexander Repyanchuk of the Weighted and Happy 5 (Ukrainian version) lost 60.13% of his total body weight
- Female: Rachel Frederickson of The Biggest Loser 15 of the American version lost 59.62% of her total body weight

Other

Jodie Prenger from series 2 of the British version was the first female biggest loser worldwide, losing 46.85% of her original body weight.

== Fit for TV: The Reality of The Biggest Loser ==
On August 15, 2025, a three-part documentary series about The Biggest Loser aired on Netflix.

== Other media ==
The Biggest Loser RunWalk is the official race series of The Biggest Loser. Dan and Jackie Evans from Season Five are the national spokespeople.

The Biggest Loser is a video game for Wii and Nintendo DS. It was released in North America on October 6, 2009 and Europe on November 13, 2009.

The Biggest Loser: Ultimate Workout is a video game for Xbox 360 which uses its Kinect camera. Developed by Blitz Games and published by THQ, it was released in North America on November 4, 2010 and Europe on November 10, 2010.

The Biggest Loser: Challenge is a video game for Wii released on November 4, 2010 in North America and November 12, 2010 in Europe.

== See also ==
- Weight loss camp
- Downsize Me!
- Operation Transformation (TV series)
