= The Biggest Winner season 3 =

The Biggest Winner
- Season 3
- Starring: Noor Khatab; Lina Rahma; Pascale Saad
- Presented by: Carolina De Oliveira

Release
- Original network: MBC 1
- Original release: October 11, 2008

Season chronology
- ← Previous; Season 2 Next → The Biggest Winner: Couples

The Biggest Winner season 3 is the third season of the Arabic version of the original NBC American reality television series The Biggest Loser. The third season premiered on October 11, 2008.

== Contestants ==
Contestant	Team	Status
Meshal Ahmad, Kuwait	Red Team	Eliminated Week 1
Khaled Habib, Bahrain	Blue Team	Eliminated Week 2
Mohammad Bumoza, Saudi Arabia	Red Team	Eliminated Week 3
Hasan Al-Rawi, Iraq	Blue Team	Eliminated Week 4
Suhair Zoubat, Algeria	Blue Team	Eliminated Week 5
Lamia Derazy, Bahrain	Red Team	Eliminated Week 6
Iman Al-Ali, Jordan	Red Team	Eliminated Week 7
Amr Na'es, Syria	Red Team	Eliminated Week 8
Heba Nazer, Saudi Arabia	Blue Team	Eliminated Week 9
Bothayna Al-Hedri, Morocco	Red Team	Eliminated Week 10
Rasheda Sulaiman, Egypt	Blue Team	Eliminated Week 11
Finale
Azari Hamod, Kuwait	Blue Team	2nd Ruuner Up
Mohanad Al-jeddawi, Saudi Arabia	Blue Team	Runner Up
Mohammad Mazboudi, Lebanon	Red Team	The Biggest Winner

Teams
Member of Noor's Team
Member of Lina's Team
Winners
250,000 SAR. Winner (among the finalists)
50,000 SAR. Winner (among the eliminated contestants)

== Weigh-ins and eliminations ==
Contestant	Age	Height	Starting BMI	Ending BMI	Starting weight	Week											Reunion	Finale	Weight lost	Percentage lost
Contestant	Age	Height	Starting BMI	Ending BMI	Starting weight	1	2	3	4	5	6	7	8	9	10	11	Reunion	Finale	Weight lost	Percentage lost
Mohammad M	30	178	54.8	30.5	173.5	166.1	162.4	158.5	153.4	148.0	144.8	137.3	136.9	134.5	129.9	127.0	Weighed at Finale	96.6	-76.9	-44.32%
Mohanad	29	194	52.6	37.4	198.0	188.5	186.4	182.3	179.5	173.8	171.3	170.0	169.0	163.6	157.0	152.2	Weighed at Finale	140.6	-57.4	-28.99%
Azari	22	160	38.8	29.6	99.3	96.6	96.3	94.6	92.4	91.7	87.5*	84.5	84.0	81.8	80.4	78.5	Weighed at Finale	75.9	-23.4	-23.56%
Rasheda	30	162	43.4	31.3	113.9	110.1	109.1	106.8	103.2	101.6	98.1	100.6	100.0	94.0	91.0	89.4	82.2	Weighed at Reunion	-31.7	-27.83%
Bothayna	32	165	39.3	31.3	107.0	103.4	102.4	101.2	99.3	96.7	94.6	92.4	90.7	90.0	87.4		85.1	Weighed at Reunion	-31.7	-20.47%
Heba	22	169	44.6	32.4	127.5	124.9	123.7	123.5	121.3	119.8	115.7	113.4	111.8	113.0			92.5	Weighed at Reunion	-35.0	-27.45%
Amr	23	184	40.8	27.2	138.0	133.0	131.4	128.5	125.5	122.5	119.7	114.5	113.0				92.1	Weighed at Reunion	-45.9	-33.26%
Iman	23	161	41.1	X	106.6	102.3	101.9	100.8	97.2	96.4	92.7	90.5					did not attend			
Lamia	28	167	52.0	36.7	145.0	140.3	137.4	135.0	131.4	129.8	126.8						102.3	Weighed at Reunion	-42.7	-29.45%
Suhair	32	159	57.9	47.3	146.5	141.8	141.4	138.0	134.9	134.0							119.5	Weighed at Reunion	-27.0	-18.43%
Hasan	31	176	44.3	26.0	137.3	129.4	126.9	124.7	121.8								80.6	Weighed at Reunion	-56.7	-41.30%
Mohammad B	30	177	51.1	32.5	160.2	152.8	148.5	146.9									101.8	Weighed at Reunion	-58.4	-36.45%
Khaled	23	180	46.5	34.9	150.5	144.5	145.0										113.1	Weighed at Reunion	-37.4	-24.85%
Meshal	32	178	45.7	X	144.7	X											did not attend			

Game
Week's Biggest Winner
Gain weight
X did not attend
Winners
250,000 SAR Winner (among the finalists)
50,000 SAR Winner (among the eliminated contestants)
BMI
Normal (18.5 - 24.9 BMI)
Overweight (25 - 29.9 BMI)
Obese Class I (30 - 34.9 BMI)
Obese Class II (35 - 39.9 BMI)
Obese Class III (greater than 40 BMI)
Notes
All contestant weights are in kilograms
All contestant heights are in centimetres

=== Weight Loss History ===
Contestant	Week											
Contestant	1	2	3	4	5	6	7	8	9	10	11	Finale
Mohammad.M	-7.4	-3.7	-3.9	-5.1	-5.4	-3.2	-7.5	-0.4	-2.4	-4.6	-2.9	-30.4
Mohanad	-9.5	2.1	-4.1	-2.8	-5.7	-2.5	-1.3	-1.0	-5.4	-6.6	-4.8	-11.6
Azari	-2.7	-0.3	-1.7	-2.2	-0.7	-4.2*	-3.0	0.0	-2.7	-1.4	-1.9	-2.6
Rasheda	-3.8	-1.0	-2.3	-3.6	-1.6	-3.5	+2.5	-0.6	-6.0	-3.0	-1.6	-7.2
Bothayna	-3.9	-1.0	-1.2	-1.9	-2.6	-2.1	-2.2	-1.7	-0.7	-2.6	-2.3	
Heba	-2.6	-1.2	-0.2	-2.2	-1.5	-4.1	-2.3	-1.6	+1.2	-20.5		
Amr	-5	-1.6	-2.9	-3.0	-3.0	-2.8	-5.2	-1.5	-20.9			
Iman	-4.3	-0.4	-1.1	-3.6	-0.8	-3.7	-2.2	X				
Lamia	-4.7	-2.9	-2.4	-3.6	-1.6	-3.0	-24.5					
Suhair	-4.7	-0.4	-3.4	-3.1	-0.9	-14.5						
Hasan	-7.9	-2.5	-2.2	-2.9	-41.2							
Mohammad.B	-7.4	-4.3	-1.6	-45.1								
Khaled	-6	+0.5	-31.9									
Meshal	X	X										

== Voting History ==
Name	Week 1	Week 2	Week 3	Week 4	Week 5	Week 6	Week 7	Week 8	Week 9	Week 10	Week 11
Eliminated	Meshal	Khaled	Mohammad.B	Hasan	Suhair	Lamia	Iman	Amr*	Heba	Bothayna	Rasheda
Mohammad.M	Meshal	X	Iman	X	X	Lamia	Iman	X	Heba	Azari	X
Mohanad	X	Khaled	X	Suhair	Azari	X	Heba	Mohammad.M	Bothayna	Bothayna	Mohammad.M
Azari	X	?	X	Hasan	Sohair	X	Iman	Amr	Heba	X	Rasheda
Rasheda	X	Khaled	X	Suhair	Suhair	X	Heba	Mohammad.M	Bothayna	Bothayna	X
Bothayna	Meshal	X	Amr	X	X	Lamia	Iman	Amr	X	X	
Heba	X	Khaled	X	Hasan	Suhair	X	X	Mohammad.M	X		
Amr	Meshal	X	Mohammad.B	X	X	Lamia	Iman	X			
Iman	?	X	Mohammad.B	X	X	Mohammad.M	X				
Lamia	Meshal	X	Mohammad.B	X	X	Mohammad.M					
Suhair	X	Khaled	X	Hasan	Azari						
Hasan	X	Suhair	X	Suhair							
Mohammad.B	Meshal	X	Iman								
Khaled	X	Heba									
Meshal	Bothayna										

X Not in elimination, unable to vote
? Vote not revealed
Immunity
X Below yellow line, unable to vote
Notes
^{*} Although Mohammad M was voted out, he was allowed to stay because he had a safe card, and Amr was eliminated.
