= The Biggest Winner season 1 =

The Biggest Winner
- Season 1
- Starring: Hani Abu Al-Naja; Zaina Habi; Pascale Saad
- Presented by: Carolina De Oliveira

Release
- Original network: MBC 1
- Original release: April 29, 2006

Season chronology
- Next → Season 2

The Biggest Winner season 1 is the first season of the Arabic version of the original NBC American reality television series The Biggest Loser. It premiered on April 26, 2006.

== Contestants ==
Contestant	Team	Status
Katherine Al-Kheder, Syria	Blue Team	Eliminated Week 1
Dalia Abualsaud, Jordan	Blue Team	Eliminated Week 2
Ahmad Al-Mehana, Kuwait	Red Team	Eliminated Week 3
Reda Mata, Lebanon	Blue Team	Eliminated Week 4
Hatem Lashain, Egypt	Red Team	Eliminated Week 5
Walead Al-Jasem, Iraq	Red Team	Eliminated Week 6
Lina Bakear, Lebanon	Red Team	Eliminated Week 7
Hadair Shabib, Egypt	Red Team	Eliminated Week 8
Darean Mahmoud, Saudi Arabia	Red Team	Eliminated Week 9
Kawthar Al-Bakar, Bahrain	Blue Team	Eliminated Week 10
Abdullah Al-Khalaki, Saudi Arabia	Blue Team	Eliminated Week 11
Finale
Nehad Al-Akhdar, Tunisia	Red Team	2nd Runner Up
Moustafa Al-Mobarak, Saudi Arabia	Blue Team	Runner Up
Abdullah Hammad, Jordan	Blue Team	The Biggest Winner

Teams
Member of Zaina's Team
Member of Hani's Team
Winners
250,000 SAR. Winner (among the finalists)
50,000 SAR. Winner (among the eliminated contestants)
