= The Biggest Winner season 2 =

The Biggest Winner
- Season 2
- Starring: Hani Abu Al-Naja; Zaina Habi; Pascale Saad
- Presented by: Carolina De Oliveira

Release
- Original network: MBC 1
- Original release: October 27, 2007

Season chronology
- ← Previous; Season 1 Next → Season 3

The Biggest Winner season 2 is the second season of the Arabic version of the original NBC American reality television series The Biggest Loser. The second season premiered on October 27, 2007.

== Contestants ==
Contestant	Team	Status
Ahmad Al-Zofiri , Kuwait	Blue Team	Eliminated Week 2*
Hanan Abu Hamda , Palestinian	Red Team	Eliminated Week 3
Faisal Al-Ghamdi , Saudi Arabia	Blue Team	Quit
Huwaida Al-Karteli , Morocco	Red Team	Eliminated Week 4
Ihab Al-Kholi , Egypt	Blue Team	Eliminated Week 5
Amani Mohammad , Iraq	Red Team	Eliminated Week 6
Fadol Al-Faran , Saudi Arabia	Blue Team	Eliminated Week 7
Samira Al-Oni , Algeria	Red Team	Eliminated Week 8
Salemah Al-Hebshi , Saudi Arabia	Red Team	Eliminated Week 9
Fahad Khalefa , Saudi Arabia	Blue Team	Eliminated Week 10
Ahmad Al-Bekeri , Qatar	Blue Team	Eliminated Week 11
Finale
Abir Shahada , Lebanon	Red Team	2nd Runner up
Wala Adel , Egypt	Red Team	Runner Up
Waleed Hamid , United Arab Emirates	Blue Team	The Biggest Winner

Teams
Member of Hani's Team
Member of Patci's Team
Winners
250,000 SAR. Winner (among the finalists)
50,000 SAR. Winner (among the eliminated contestants)

^{*} Fahad was eliminated in week 1 but because Fisal quit, Fahad replaced Fisal.
