= TBLA =

TBLA may stand for:

- The Biggest Loser Asia, the Asian version of the competitive reality television series The Biggest Loser
- The Brave Little Abacus, an American emo band
- Taboola, an American public advertising company traded as TBLA
