= The Biggest Loser Asia =

Asian reality television show

The Biggest Loser Asia is the Asian version of the competitive reality television series The Biggest Loser. It had two seasons:

- The Biggest Loser Asia (season 1), the first season of The Biggest Loser Asia, aired on Hallmark Channel
- The Biggest Loser Asia (season 2), the second season of The Biggest Loser Asia, aired on Diva Universal
