= The Biggest Winner: Couples =

- Presented by: Carolina De Oliveira
- Starring: Noor Khatab; Lina Rahma; Pascale Saad
- Country of origin: Lebanon
- Original language: Arabic

Production
- Running time: 90 minutes

Original release
- Network: MBC 1
- Release: September 26, 2009

The Biggest Winner: Couples is the fourth season of The Biggest Winner, the Arabic version of the reality television series The Biggest Loser. It premiered on September 26, 2009. The season started with eight couples (16 contestants) from six Arab countries and, unlike all past seasons, instead of the competition between Red and Blue Team, the couples competed against each other.

== Contestants ==
Contestant	Couples Team	Blue vs. Red	Status	Couples Relationship
Turqi Al-Motiri, Saudi Arabia	Green Team		Eliminated Week 1	Friends
Izat Kabbi, Saudi Arabia	Green Team		Eliminated Week 1	Friends
Mushari Al-Mosbah, Kuwait	Sky Blue Team		Eliminated Week 2	Friends
Ahmad Al-Fodari, Kuwait	Sky Blue Team		Eliminated Week 2	Friends
Marilyn Saleh, Jordan	Pink Team		Eliminated Week 3	Sisters
Mealda Saleh, Jordan	Pink Team		Eliminated Week 3	Sisters
Ittidal Musa, Saudi Arabia	Yellow Team		Eliminated Week 4	Strangers
Madeline Saleh, Jordan	Yellow Team		Eliminated Week 4	Strangers
Huda Bakeesh, Morocco	Orange Team	Red Team	Eliminated Week 5	Huyam's Sister
Abdulaziz Shesha, Saudi Arabia	Purple Team	Red Team	Eliminated Week 6	Elham's Husband
Huyam Bakeesh, Morocco	Orange Team	Blue Team	Eliminated Week 7	Huda's Sister
Amgad Abdullah, Egypt	Black Team	Blue Team	Eliminated Week 8	Karim's Brother
Elham Abualsaud, Saudi Arabia	Purple Team	Blue Team	Eliminated Week 9	Abdulaziz's Wife
Madeline Saleh, Jordan	Yellow Team		Eliminated Week 10	No Relationship
Orwa Al-Korah, Syria	White Team	Red Team	Eliminated Week 11	Marah's Brother
Finale
Abdulaziz Shesha, Saudi Arabia	Purple Team	Red Team	2nd Runner Up	Elham's Husband
Marah Al-korah, Syria	White Team	Blue Team	Runner Up	Orwa's Sister
Karim Abdullah, Egypt	Black Team	Red Team	The Biggest Winner	Amgad's Brother

Winners
250,000 SAR. Winner (among the finalists)
50,000 SAR. Winner (among the eliminated contestants)

- Second place has prize 30 SAR.
- Third place has 20 SAR.

== Weigh-ins and eliminations ==
Contestant	Age	Height	Starting BMI	Ending BMI	Starting Weight	Week											Reunion	Finale	Weight Lost	Percentage Lost
Contestant	Age	Height	Starting BMI	Ending BMI	Starting Weight	1	2	3	4	5	6	7	8	9	10	11	Reunion	Finale	Weight Lost	Percentage Lost
Karim	29	205	41.4	23.4	173.9	168.0	164.4	161.5	158.7	154.7	152.1	148.7	146.4	142.7	142.5	134.7	Weighted at Finale	98.5	-75.4	-43.36%
Marah	32	171	46.6	27.4	136.4	129.8	128.3	126.8	123.9	121.7	119.9	115.4	114.0	116.0	111.7	107.0	Weighted at Finale	80.2	-56.2	-41.20%
Abdulaziz	28	176	40.3	26.1	124.7	118.8	117.1	118.4	111.3	110.3	109.7	107.2	105.2	105.5	103.9	97.5	Weighted at Finale	80.8	-43.9	-35.20%
Orwa	23	184	44.7	27.7	151.3	145.3	142.2	139.7	136.8	133.9	130.8	126.7	124.0	120.7	117.2	113.9	93.8	Weighed at Reunion	-57.5	-38.00%
Madeline	23	154	47.2	29.7	112.0	105.5	103.1	100.9	98.2			92.3	91.4	88.6	86.4		70.5	Weighed at Reunion	-41.5	-37.05%
Elham	26	170	44.6	32.9	128.9	122.6	119.9	122.6	116.9	114.4	111.6	108.7	107.7	107.9			95.1	Weighed at Reunion	-33.8	-26.22%
Amgad	27	171	42.6	36.6	124.5	120.8	118.3	117.2	115.3	114.4	112.6	109.6	108.9				107.1	Weighed at Reunion	-17.4	-13.98%
Huyam	25	166	46.0	30.6	126.7	122.7	120.2	116.6	114.2	112.2	109.3	107.0					84.2	Weighed at Reunion	-42.5	-33.54%
Huda	28	168	48.0	32.8	135.5	130.6	128.6	127.2	123.0	122.5		115.3					92.6	Weighed at Reunion	-42.9	-31.66%
Ittidal	21	172	42.0	32.8	124.2	120.7	119.3	117.2	114.7			107.1					97.1	Weighed at Reunion	-27.1	-21.82%
Mealda	25	164	50.1	33.0	134.7	130.4	129.2	128.6				117.2					88.7	Weighed at Reunion	-46.0	-34.15%
Marilyn	20	166	45.3	34.5	124.8	120.8	120.2	117.6				109.1					95.0	Weighed at Reunion	-29.8	-23.88%
Ahmad	30	178	49.6	X	157.1	154.2	155.3					X					did not attend			
Mushari	26	180	52.8	44.5	171.0	164.4	163.7					154.8					144.2	Weighed at Reunion	-26.8	-15.67%
Turqi	25	179	40.7	34.9	130.5	131.0						122.0					111.9	Weighed at Reunion	-18.6	-14.25%
Izat	24	184	46.0	34.5	155.8	154.2						135.4					116.9	Weighed at Reunion	-38.9	-24.97%

Game
Week's Biggest Winner
Gain weight
Results from Eliminated Players Weigh in (Week 7)
X did not attend
Winners
250,000 SAR Winner (among the finalists)
50,000 SAR Winner (among the eliminated contestants)
BMI
Normal (18.5 - 24.9 BMI)
Overweight (25 - 29.9 BMI)
Obese Class I (30 - 34.9 BMI)
Obese Class II (35 - 39.9 BMI)
Obese Class III (greater than 40 BMI)
Notes
All contestant weights are in kilograms
All contestant heights are in centimetres

=== Weight Loss History ===
Contestant	Week											Finale
Contestant	1	2	3	4	5	6	7	8	9	10	11	Finale
Karim	-5.9	-3.6	-2.9	-2.8	-4.0	-2.6	-3.4	-2.3	-3.7	-0.2	-7.8	-36.2
Marah	-6.6	-1.5	-1.5	-2.9	-2.2	-1.8	-4.5	-1.4	+2.0	-4.3	-4.7	-26.8
Abdulaziz	-5.9	-1.7	+1.3	-7.1	-1.0	-0.6	-2.5	-2.0	+0.3	-1.6	-6.4	-16.2
Orwa	-6.0	-3.1	-2.5	-2.9	-2.9	-3.1	-4.1	-2.7	-3.3	-3.5	-3.3	-20.1
Madeline	-6.5	-2.4	-2.2	-2.7	-5.9			-0.9	-2.8	-2.2	-15.9	
Elham	-6.3	-2.7	+2.7	-5.7	-2.5	-2.8	-2.9	-1.0	+0.2	-12.8		
Amgad	-3.7	-2.5	-1.7	-1.9	-0.9	-1.8	-3.0	-0.7	-1.8			
Huyam	-4.0	-2.5	-3.6	-2.4	-2.0	-2.9	-2.3	-22.8				
Huda	-4.9	-2.0	-1.4	-4.2	-0.5	-7.2		-22.7				
Ittidal	-3.5	-1.4	-2.1	-2.5	-7.6			-10.0				
Mealda	-4.3	-1.2	-0.6	-11.4				-28.5				
Marilyn	-4.0	-0.6	-2.6	-8.5				-14.1				
Ahmad	-2.9	+1.1	X					X				
Mushari	-6.6	-0.7	-8.9					-10.6				
Turqi	+0.5	-9.0						-10.1				
Izat	-1.6	-18.4						-18.5				

== Voting History ==
Name	Week										
Name	1	2	3	4	5	6	7	8	9	10	11
Eliminated	Turqi & Izat	Ahmad & Mushari	Mealda & Mareline	Ittidal & Madeline	Huda	Abdulaziz	Huyam	Amgad	Elham	Madeline	Orwa
Karim	Turqi & Izat	Ahmad & Mushari	X	X	Huda	X	X	Elham	Elham	X	Orwa
Marah	Turqi & Izat	Ahmad & Mushari	Mealda & Mareline	X	X	X	Huyam	Amgad	Elham	Madeline	X
Abdulaziz	Turqi & Izat	Ahmad & Mushari	Mealda & Mareline	X	Huda	X		Amgad	X	?	Marah
Orwa	Turqi & Izat	Ahmad & Mushari	Mealda & Mareline	X	Huda	Abdulaziz	Huyam	Amgad	Abdulaziz	Madeline	X
Madeline	Turqi & Izat	Ahmad & Mushari	Amgad & Karim	X				Elham	Elham	X	
Elham	Turqi & Izat	Ahmad & Mushari	Mealda & Mareline	X	X	X	Huyam	X	X		
Amgad	Turqi & Izat	Ahmad & Mushari	X	X	X	X	Huyam	X			
Huyam	Mealda & Mareline	Ahmad & Mushari	Mealda & Mareline	Ittidal & Madeline	X	X	X				
Huda	Mealda & Mareline	Ahmad & Mushari	Mealda & Mareline	Ittidal & Madeline	Abdulaziz						
Ittidal	Turqi & Izat	Ahmad & Mushari	Amgad & Karim	X							
Mealda	X	X	X								
Mareline	X	X	X								
Ahmad	Mealda & Mareline	X									
Mushari	Mealda & Mareline	X									
Turqi	X										
Izat	X										

X Below yellow line, unable to vote
Immunity
X Not in elimination, unable to vote
X Vote not revealed
? Immunity and Vote not revealed
