= Laredet Begadol =

Israeli reality television show

Laredet Begadol (Hebrew: To Get Down in Big) is a reality show broadcast on Channel 10. It is hosted by Tzipi Shavit and Michal Yannai. The show is based on "The Biggest Loser" on NBC television; program participants are overweight people looking to lose weight.
