= The Biggest Loser season 14 =

The Biggest Loser
- Season 14
- No. of episodes: 12

Release
- Original network: NBC
- Original release: January 6 – March 18, 2013

Season chronology
- ← Previous; Season 13 (No Excuses) Next → Season 15 (Second Chances 2)

The Biggest Loser: Challenge America is the fourteenth season of the NBC reality television series entitled The Biggest Loser. The contestants will compete to win a $250,000 prize, which will be awarded to Danni Allen, the contestant with the highest percentage of weight lost. It premiered on January 6, 2013. Alongside veteran trainer Bob Harper and returning trainer Dolvett Quince, Jillian Michaels returned for the first time since season 11. While the contestants have been split into three teams, White (Jillian), Blue (Bob), and Red (Dolvett), the contestants may train with any of the three trainers. In addition, three younger contestants (ages 13–16) are participating, but not subject to elimination. This was the first time since season 11 that America decided who made it to the live finale.

== Contestants ==
A total of fifteen contestants are competing in the season, divided into three teams: Red, Blue and White. Three teenagers are also participating, but are not subject to elimination.

Name	Team	Singles	Status	Total votes
Teenagers
Noah "Biingo" Gray, 13, New Windsor, MD	Blue Team	Blue	Not on Ranch	—N/a
Lindsay Bravo, 13, Fillmore, CA	Red Team	Red	Not on Ranch	—N/a
Sanjana "Sunny" Chandrasekar, 16, Rochester, NY	White Team	White	Not on Ranch	—N/a
Adults
Nicole "Nikki" Davis, 26, Chatsworth, CA	White Team		Quit Week 1	^{[Q]}
Thomas "TC" Pool, 31, Albany, OR	White Team		Eliminated Week 1	^{[R]}
Nathan Montgomery, 25, Colorado Springs, CO	White Team		Eliminated Week 2	^{[R]}
Cate Laughlan, 27, Ransomville, NY	Red Team		Eliminated Week 3	3
Pamela "Pam" Geil, 43, New York, NY	White Team		Eliminated Week 4	^{[E1]}
Lisa Rambo, 37, Hudson, WI	Red Team		Eliminated Week 5	3
David Jones, 51, Kiefer, OK	Blue Team		Eliminated Week 6	3
Michael Dorsey, 34, Baltimore, MD	Blue Team	Grey	Eliminated Week 7	3
Francelina Morillo, 25, Albany, NY	Red Team	Orange	Eliminated Week 8	^{[R]}
Alexandra "Alex" Reid, 24, Carrollton, TX	Blue Team	Green	Eliminated Week 9	2
Gina McDonald, 47, Hoover, AL	Blue Team	Purple	Eliminated Week 11	^{[R]}
Joe Ostaszewski, 43, Williston, FL	Red Team	Maroon	America's Vote Victim	
Jackson Carter, 21, Layton, UT	Red Team	Yellow	2nd Runner-Up	
Jeff Nichols, 24, Monroe, MI	Blue Team	Aqua	Runner-Up	
Dannielle "Danni" Allen, 26, Wheeling, IL	White Team	Pink	Biggest Loser	

The "Total Votes" column indicates the number of votes cast against the contestant when he/she was eliminated.
^[Q] This contestant quit the competition.
^[R] This contestant fell below the Red Line, and was eliminated without any votes.
^[E1] This contestant lost a weigh-in and was eliminated without any votes, due to having the lower percentage of weight loss on a team with just two remaining contestants.

== Weigh-ins ==
Contestants are listed in reverse chronological order of elimination.

Contestant	Age	Height	Starting BMI	Current BMI	Starting weight	Week										Semi- final	Finale	Weight lost	Percentage lost
Contestant	Age	Height	Starting BMI	Current BMI	Starting weight	1	2	3	4	5	6	7	8	9	10	Semi- final	Finale	Weight lost	Percentage lost
Danni	26	5'6"	41.6	22.1	258	239	234	228	222	213	207	201	194	184	174	163	137	121	46.90%
Jeff	24	5'11"	54.1	28.9	388	359	359	348	342	329	323	312	308	295	276	265	207	181	46.65%
Jackson	21	5'6"	52.9	30.7	328	306	302	300	288	280	279	266	261	250	235	230	190	138	42.07%
Joe	43	6'2"	46.7	27.9	364	338	326	317	310	299	291	279	273	261	244	239	217	147	40.38%
Gina	47	5'1"	46.3	24.9	245	230	223	215	206	197	193	184	180	173	163	161	132	113	46.12%
Alex	24	5'4"	41.2	26.8	240	231	225	221	217	207	204	198	195	187			156	84	35.00%
Francelina	25	5'6"	43.1	27.8	267	248	242	237	231	224	217	213	211				172	95	35.58%
Michael	34	6'1"	58.6	40.6	444	423	409	396	384	371	363	353					308	136	30.63%
David	51	5'9"	45.3	30.3	307	287	278	272	263	253	250						205	102	33.22%
Lisa	37	5'7"	38.5	21.6	246	230	225	223	214	209							138	108	43.90%
Pam	43	5'6"	38.3	26.6	237	227	219	210	207								166	71	29.96%
Cate	27	5'3"	39.4	28.8	237	225	220	218									173	64	27.00%
Nathan	25	6'3"	44.9	32.5	359	339	334										260	99	27.58%
TC	31	6'0"	51.0	36.1	376	361											266	110	29.26%
Nikki	26	5'11"	39.1	X	280	WD											Did not weigh in		

Standings
Week's Biggest Loser (Team or Individuals)
Week's Biggest Loser and Immunity
Immunity (Challenge or Weigh-in)
Results from At-Home Players
Contestant Withdraws before Weigh-In

BMI
Underweight (less than 18.5 BMI)
Normal (18.5 – 24.9 BMI)
Overweight (25 – 29.9 BMI)
Obese Class I (30 – 34.9 BMI)
Obese Class II (35 – 39.9 BMI)
Obese Class III (greater than 40 BMI)

Winners
$250,000 Winner (among the finalists)
$100,000 Winner (among the eliminated contestants)

=== Weigh-In Difference History ===
Contestant	Week											
Contestant	1	2	3	4	5	6	7	8	9	10	11	Finale
Danni	−19	−5	−6	−6	−9	−6	−6	−7	−10	−10	−11	−26
Jeff	−29	0	−11	−6	−13	−6	−11	−4	−13	−19	−11	−58
Jackson	−22	−4	−2	−12	−8	−1	−13	−5	−11	−15	−5	−40
Joe	−26	−12	−9	−7	−11	−8	−12	−6	−12	−17	−5	−22
Gina	−15	−7	−8	−9	−9	−4	−9	−4	−7	−10	−2	-29
Alex	−9	−6	−4	−4	−10	−3	−6	−3	−8	-31		
Francelina	−19	−6	−5	−6	−7	−7	−4	−2	-39			
Michael	−21	−14	−13	−12	−13	−8	−10	-45				
David	−20	−9	−6	−9	−10	−3	-45					
Lisa	−16	−5	−2	−9	−5	-71						
Pam	−10	−8	−9	−3	-44							
Cate	−12	−5	−2	-45								
Nathan	−20	−5	-74									
TC	−15	-95										
Nikki	X	X										

=== Weigh-In Percentage History ===
Contestant	Week											
Contestant	1	2	3	4	5	6	7	8	9	10	11	Finale
Danni	−7.36%	−2.09%	−2.56%	−2.63%	−4.05%	−2.82%	−2.90%	−3.48%	−5.15%	−5.43%	−6.32%	−27.60%
Jeff	−7.47%	0.00%	−3.06%	−1.72%	−3.80%	−1.82%	−3.41%	−1.28%	−4.22%	−6.44%	−3.99%	−21.89%
Jackson	−6.71%	−1.31%	−0.66%	−4.00%	−2.78%	−0.36%	−4.66%	−1.88%	−4.21%	−6.00%	−2.13%	−17.39%
Joe	−7.14%	−3.55%	−2.76%	−2.21%	−3.55%	−2.68%	−4.12%	−2.15%	−4.40%	−6.51%	−2.05%	-9.02%
Gina	−6.12%	−3.04%	−3.59%	−4.19%	−4.37%	−2.03%	−4.66%	−2.17%	−3.89%	−5.78%	−1.23%	-31.67%
Alex	−3.75%	−2.60%	−1.78%	−1.81%	−4.61%	−1.45%	−2.94%	−1.52%	−4.10%	-16.57%		
Francelina	−7.12%	−2.42%	−2.07%	−2.53%	−3.03%	−3.13%	−2.76%	−0.94%	-18.48%			
Michael	−4.73%	−3.31%	−3.18%	−3.03%	−3.39%	−2.16%	−2.75%	-39.94%				
David	−6.51%	−3.14%	−2.16%	−3.31%	−3.80%	−1.19%	-18.00%					
Lisa	−6.50%	−2.17%	−0.89%	−4.04%	−2.34%	-33.97%						
Pam	−4.22%	−3.52%	−4.11%	−1.43%	-37.19%							
Cate	−5.06%	−2.22%	−0.91%	-20.64%								
Nathan	−5.57%	−1.47%	-40.71%									
TC	−3.99%	-25.23%										
Nikki	X	X										

=== Total overall percentage of weight loss (Biggest Loser on Campus) ===
Bold denotes who has the overall highest percentage of weight loss as of that week

Contestant	Week										
Contestant	1	2	3	4	5	6	7	8	9	10	11
Danni	−7.36%	−9.30%	−11.63%	−13.95%	−17.44%	−19.77%	−22.09%	−24.81%	−28.68%	−32.56%	**-36.82%**
Jeff	**-7.47%**	−7.47%	−10.31%	−11.86%	−15.21%	−16.75%	−19.59%	−20.62%	−23.97%	−28.87%	−31.70%
Jackson	−6.71%	−7.93%	−8.54%	−12.20%	−14.63%	−14.94%	−18.90%	−20.43%	−23.78%	−28.35%	−29.88%
Joe	−7.14%	**-10.44%**	**-12.91%**	−14.84%	−17.86%	−20.05%	−23.35%	−25.00%	−28.30%	−32.97%	−34.34%
Gina	−6.12%	−8.98%	−12.24%	**-15.92%**	**-19.59%**	**-21.22%**	**-24.90%**	**-26.53%**	**-29.39%**	**-33.47%**	−34.29%
Alex	−3.75%	−6.25%	−7.92%	−9.58%	−13.75%	−15.00%	−17.50%	−18.75%	−22.08%		
Francelina	−7.12%	−9.36%	−11.24%	−13.48%	−16.10%	−18.73%	−20.22%	−20.97%			
Michael	−4.73%	−7.88%	−10.81%	−13.51%	−16.44%	−18.24%	−20.50%				
David	−6.51%	−9.45%	−11.40%	−14.33%	−17.59%	−18.57%					
Lisa	−6.50%	−8.54%	−9.35%	−13.01%	−15.04%						
Pam	−4.22%	−7.59%	−11.39%	−12.66%							
Cate	−5.06%	−7.17%	−8.02%								
Nathan	−5.57%	−6.96%									
TC	−3.99%										
Nikki	X										

== Voting History ==
Contestant	Week											
Contestant	1	2	3	4	5	6	7	8	9	10	11	Finale
Eliminated	Nikki TC	Nathan	Cate	Pam	Lisa	David	Michael	Francelina	Alex	None	Gina	Joe
Danni	X	X	X	X	X	X	Michael	X	Alex	X	X	Biggest Loser
Jeff	X	X	X	X	X	David	Michael	X	?	X	X	Runner-up
Jackson	X	X	Lisa	X	Lisa	X	?	X	X	X	X	X
Joe	X	X	Cate	X	Lisa	X	?	X	Alex	X	X	Eliminated
Gina	X	X	X	X	X	David	Michael	X	?	X	X	Eliminated Week 11
Alex	X	X	X	X	X	?	Francelina	X	X	Eliminated Week 9		
Francelina	X	X	Cate	X	Lisa	X	X	X	Eliminated Week 8			
Michael	X	X	X	X	X	David	X	Eliminated Week 7				
David	X	X	X	X	X	Jeff	Eliminated Week 6					
Lisa	X	X	Cate	X	Jackson	Eliminated Week 5						
Pam	X	X	X	X	Eliminated Week 4							
Cate	X	X	Jackson	Eliminated Week 3								
Nathan	X	X	Eliminated Week 2									
TC	X	Eliminated Week 1										
Nikki	WD	Withdrew Week 1										

Immunity
? Immunity, vote not revealed
X Immunity, unable to vote
X Below yellow line, unable to vote
X Below red line, only player left on the losing team, or player on the losing team (of only 2 remaining contestants) with the lower percentage of weight loss, automatically eliminated
X On the losing team, escaped the red line
X Not in elimination, unable to vote
Eliminated or not in house
Last person eliminated (at the finale) via public voting
WD Contestant quit the competition
Valid vote cast
? Vote not revealed or unknown
X Below yellow line, America's vote
$250,000 winner (among the finalists)

== Weekly summary ==
=== Week 1: "We're Back... And So Is Jillian" ===
First aired January 6, 2013

Thousands of hopeful contestants gathered at a theater to find out which fifteen contestants will participate in the new season. Alison Sweeney first introduced the three teenage ambassadors who will compete in the game as the face of childhood obesity: Bingo, Lindsay and Sunny. These contestants will lose weight alongside all the contestants and support their team color throughout the entire season. Afterwards, the trainers Bob, Dolvett and returnee Jillian face the crowd and re-introduce themselves to the new outreach of the show. Alison then called up the fifteen official contestants one by one. Among them are 34-year-old Michael, a father who wants to reach out for his only son; 21-year-old Jackson, the show's first openly gay contestant who wants to stand up for his bullying and sexuality; and 31-year-old TC, a father of three that vowed to lose weight after a car crash affected his older son's capabilities.

The fifteen arrive at the Ranch to find out their assigned teams and get straight into the gym for their first workout. While the adults worked out in the gym, Dolvett worked with the teens outside with activity-based exercises. The next day, the contestants competed in their first competition of the season. Teams had to spell out the word "The Biggest Loser" by scavenging for letters in a ball pit. The teens directed the adults from bungee in the air. It was a close three team battle, but the White Team successfully spelled it first, winning the team a five-pound advantage in the first weigh-in. For the last-chance workout, the contestants still showed extreme struggle in the gym, especially for White Team's Nikki. When Jillian worked with Nikki one-on-one, she still lacked motivation and concentration. A frustrated Jillian gave her two options: keep on exercising or walk out. Nikki's emotional toll proved to be too much, and decided to walk out of the ranch for good.

At the first weigh-in of the season, contestants received the surprising news of the Red Line, meaning the losing team's last placer would automatically be eliminated by the end of the night. With the White Team's five pound advantage, the four player team lost a total of 69 pounds. The Red Team had to lose more than 80 pounds to stay alive, and succeeded with 95 pounds. Lastly, the Blue Team had to lose 91 pounds to beat White. Despite Alex's shocking weight loss of only nine pounds, the team was spared with 94 pounds. With 3.99% of weight loss, TC lost the least between Danni, Nathan and Pam, and was therefore eliminated. At the end of the episode, it was revealed that TC currently weighed at 320 pounds, losing 56 pounds since his weight loss journey.

=== Week 2: "Keep Moving" ===
First aired January 7, 2013

Another week begins at the ranch with Alison's news that another red line elimination will occur for the second straight week. Teams trained in specially built outdoor gyms by their trainers for the entire week. The White Team's motivation wasn't enough for Jillian, continuing with her "tough love" training method. At one point, Danni, one of Jillian's trainees, even received an ice bucket shower on her head. Because of their lack of working harder for the week, Jillian takes her team inside to personally improve and rejuvenate their skills. For Week 2's challenge, Bingo, Lindsay and Sunny returned with their teams alongside NFL player Antonio Gates. Teams competed against each other in football obstacle courses to test their speed, strength and agility. With a three for three, the White Team pulled another surprising win. The White Team won Sunny's school a $5,000 grant and a visit with a fellow NFL football player.

On the second weigh-in, the Blue Team hit a strong note until Jeff's shocking zero-pound weight loss for the week. While the Red Team edged out the Blue Team's total weight loss by one pound, the White Team LOST to the Blue team by one pound. As a result, Nathan fell victim to the red line with his five-pound weight loss, and was automatically eliminated. Since leaving the ranch, Nathan recently weighed in at 299, a 60-pound weight loss, and proposed to his girlfriend.

=== Week 3: "Cut the Junk" ===
First aired January 14, 2013

The third week began with a trivia challenge about childhood obesity. The team who accumulated the fewest points would suffer the disadvantage of being isolated in a temptation room full of junk food and video games. The Red Team won the challenge with 3,000 points. With the Blue and White Team tied in at 2,000 points, both teams faced a tie-breaker question in which the White Team won. The Blue Team's loss gave them the disadvantage of being locked in the room for 4 1/2 hours a day for the whole week. Back home with the teenagers, Dr. Joanna Dolgoff visited their parents for their continuous benefit. The ranch, later in the week, went forward with another weekly challenge to win groceries for a year. Team members had to rummage through a sticky pit of bubblegum to a giant gumball machine, operating the machines until they obtained twenty for their team. With the White Team with only two members, Danni was recruited to help the Blue Team and Pam to cheer on for the Red Team (because she was not medically fit for the challenge). Red won their team challenge.

At the weigh-in, tensions ran high yet again with the White Team. But first, the Blue Team posed a strong team percentage of 2.81% despite the temptation room. However, after Cate's, Jackson's and Lisa's weight loss of two pounds, the Red Team finished with a weak 1.52%. After two painful weeks, the White Team achieved their first weigh-in victory with Danni's six pound weight loss and Pam's staggering nine pound weight loss. The Red Team suffered their first weigh-in loss, and faced the brand new elimination voting booth adjacent to the gym. Joe, being the team's highest percentage, was immune from elimination. With three votes, Cate was eliminated. Returning home, Cate weighs in at 196 pounds with a 41-pound weight loss.

=== Week 4: "Pay it Forward" ===
First aired January 21, 2013

The trainers left the ranch to work with the teenagers, leaving the adults to work-out on their own.

The challenge this week was to run/walk a 5K as fast as possible. The team with the best cumulative average time would split a cash prize of $15,000. David sat out of this challenge for medical reasons. The finishing orders were:

1. Danni
2. Joe
3. Pam
4. Francelina
5. Lisa
6. Jackson
7. Gina
8. Jeff
9. Michael
10. Alex.

With Danni finishing first and Pam finishing third, the White Team were the clear winners of this challenge. Danni and Pam each got to split $15,000 amongst the two of them.

However, despite winning the challenge, the White Team would lose their third weigh-in in four weeks. With a three-pound weight loss, Pam was eliminated automatically, leaving only one member still standing on the white team. Since her elimination, Pam has weighed in at 182 pounds, having lost 55 pounds, and she also treated herself to a personal makeover.

=== Week 5: "Waist & Money" ===
First aired January 28, 2013

Coming off last week, the stakes are higher than ever for the White Team. Jillian is down to her last member on her team; consequently, if Danni loses the next weigh-in, both she AND Jillian will both be going home.

The contestants found a surprise early in the week when they found out all the food in the ranch was removed, but Jackson found a note from Alison instructing them to meet her up at a nearby grocery store. There, they found out that this week, the remaining contestants were going to face the challenge of being healthy on a budget. The teams were given $70 per person to purchase one week's worth of groceries, which they all successfully met. The weekly challenge was to have the contestants swim across a pond where they had to place ten 5-pound coins per player on each team into a fountain. The winning team would have a choice: receive phone calls from home, or sell it for a two-pound advantage at this week's weigh-in. Danni won the challenge and she elects to take the two-pound advantage at the scale, in addition to receiving 10 one-year memberships to Planet Fitness.

At the weigh-in, the Red Team combined to lose a collective 31 pounds. When Alison announced that the Blue Team would weigh-in next, the reaction from Danni was heartbreaking. To stay safe, the Blue Team would need to lose more than 41 pounds. They end up demolishing that goal, losing a combined 55 pounds. Alexandra also posted her first double digit number in the competition. Now, it's the moment of truth for Danni. In order to keep herself and Jillian in the game, Danni would need to have lost more than six pounds. Adding to her two-pound advantage, the requirement was lowered to more than four pounds. After much suspense, the scale showed Danni losing nine pounds, keeping the White Team alive for at least one more week. In the end, Danni did not need that two-pound advantage this week. The Red Team suffered their second defeat in three weeks, and the team decided to give Lisa the boot. Since returning home, Lisa has weighed in at 170 pounds, losing 76 pounds since the start of her journey.

=== Week 6: "Lead by Example" ===
First aired February 4, 2013

=== Week 7: "Tough Love" ===
First aired February 11, 2013

The teams are all split up and everyone has a new color. Alison explains that there will be a yellow line and the two people with the lowest percentage of weight loss will fall below the yellow line and the others will decide which one to eliminate. The challenge was a temptation, where the person who ate the most calories would get a two-pound advantage on the scale. In celebration of Valentine's week, the winner would also give another player a two-pound advantage. Francelina wins the challenge, barely beating Alexandra and Francelina opted to give Alexandra the other two-pound advantage. The other challenge involved an ice skating rink and a flashing light. When the light shined on a spot, each player would have to run to it. The last player to get there in each round would lose, and the winner would receive a visit from a loved one for 24 hours. The winner would also give another player the same prize. Danni wins the challenge, but she opts to give Gina and Michael the visits from home. At the weigh in, Alex breaks through the one hundreds losing 6 lbs and keeping her safe, while Michael and Francelina fall below and the group decides to vote off Michael. Michael is now at home with his family and him and his wife had their vows renewed and he has lost 124 lbs.

=== Week 8: "Be Yourself" ===
First aired February 18, 2013

Week 8 started with a twist after Allison offered all of the contestants immunity, if they could collectively lose 70 pounds. If the group failed to meet the goal, the person with the lowest percentage of weight loss would fall below the red line. After a pop challenge about nutrition and a fitness test (where the kids served as ambassadors), the weight needed was reduced to 61 pounds. In the gym, ebullience transformed into tension after several contestants were giving up. Gina blew a fuse after a conflict with Joe, causing Jillian to grow very frustrated. Alex was also swathed in a defeatist mind-set after Jillian stressed that she wasn't doing her absolute best. Despite this emotional rollercoaster, they managed to mend fences.

At the challenge, the contestants had to dig sand from dunes, finding five green arrows. Once they found all five, they had to retrieve a flag and race to the end of the pier to hoist it. They managed to do so with six seconds to spare, giving them another 10 pound advantage. Instead of showing a last chance workout, the players went through a trust building exercise, where two people would hold hands and sidestep across a thin wire, as the gap increased between wires. Even though there were tense pairings (such as Gina and Joe), the contestants got to experience and understand trust on a whole new level.

At the weigh in, the goal number was 51 pounds. There were a lot of mixed feelings, as Gina's positive mind-set ticked Jillian off, the latter saying that Gina should have been positive this whole week. Danni lost 7 pounds, starting the team off strong, and falling into "one"-derland. However, the rest of the contestants pulled dismal numbers: Joe lost 6, Alex lost 3, Jackson lost 5, and Gina and Jeff lost 4. Jeff, certain that he would be going home, was left speechless when Francelina only lost 2 pounds, falling below the red line. Francelina was eliminated, and Jeff especially was very upset about it, as he and Francelina formed a very special bond throughout the competition. Since leaving the ranch, Francelina is down to 190 pounds, a 77-pound weight loss. She looks at exercise as a form of catharsis, and she and Jeff are officially dating.

=== Week 9: "Face Your Fears" ===
First aired February 25, 2013

Week 9 began with a pop challenge that gave the winner a one-pound weight advantage. The contestants placed blocks on other contestants' podiums. The winner was the contestant who placed the most blocks on other contestants' podiums to "protect" them from going home for a week. Jackson was begging other contestants to save Gina and his plan worked, and he was to be sent home. By one brick, Joe won the challenge, placing 20 blocks to Danni's 19, and earned the one-pound weight advantage. When Jackson was told he had to immediately choose one other contestant to go home with him off the ranch, Jeff volunteered to go. At the other challenge the contestants had to hold 40% of their weight or else they would fall seven stories, the last one standing would win immunity for that week. Gina won, earning immunity, as long as she didn't gain weight. Throughout the week, the contestants (and kid ambassadors) had to face their biggest fears. Gina had to lay in a coffin until she told Jillian why she needed to be at the ranch, while Danni had to sing in public, Alex had to get down and dirty in the mud, and Joe had to swim 100 meters. At the weigh in Gina lost 7 lbs with immunity she was safe, Jackson and Alex both fell below the yellow line by 1 lb. At the elimination, Alex was voted off. Since she first started at The Biggest Loser, she has lost 70 lbs.

=== Week 10: "Makeover" ===
First aired March 4, 2013

The contestants learn that it is makeover week. Tim Gunn and Ken Paves arrive to help the contestants find new looks to help them complete their transformations. Following their makeovers, all of the contestants are sent home for two weeks, where they reveal their new bodies to their friends and family members. As the contestants settle back into life at home, they are given a challenge from Allison: if the contestants can lose 5% of their respective body weights while at home, they will be granted immunity. Anyone who fails to lose 5% of his or her body weight will be up for elimination.

After their two weeks at home, the contestants return to the ranch for the weigh in. Danni is up first. To win immunity, she needs to lose at least ten pounds. She manages to lose exactly ten, successfully meeting her goal and winning immunity. Jackson is next. He needs to lose a minimum of thirteen pounds to win immunity. He loses fifteen pounds and wins immunity as well. Joe weighs in next. He needs to lose at least fourteen pounds to win immunity, but has a personal goal to lose at least fifteen pounds. He exceeds both goals, losing a total of seventeen pounds. Jeff is the fourth to weigh in, and to win immunity he must also at least fifteen pounds. He loses a whopping nineteen pounds, demolishing his goal and securing immunity for himself. Gina is the final contestant to weigh in. Because her weight is relatively low, she is very nervous about being able to achieve the nine-pound loss needed to win immunity. Her fears turn out to be unfounded, as she successfully loses ten pounds. Because all of the contestants hit their weight-loss goals, everyone was able to stay on the ranch for another week.

=== Week 11 : "Down to the Wire" ===
First aired March 11, 2013

The contestants prepare for their final weigh-in on the ranch, where they'll do battle with not one but two elimination lines. http://www.nbc.com/the-biggest-loser/video/sneak-peek-down-to-the-wire/n33492/

=== Week 12 : "Finale" ===
First aired March 18, 2013

All the contestants reunited for the finale (sans Nikki who quit the competition in week 1). America voted Jackson into the finals over Joe. Gina won the at-home prize with 46.12%. Danni lost the highest percentage among the finalists with 46.90% beating Jeff by one pound.

== U.S. Nielsen ratings ==
Order	Airdate	Rating/Share (18–49)	Viewers (millions)	Rank (timeslot)	Rank (night)
1	January 6, 2013	3.0/8	6.99	2	7
2	January 7, 2013	2.4/6	6.39	1	1
3	January 14, 2013	2.4/6	6.32	3	7
4	January 21, 2013	2.4/6	6.07	3	7
5	January 28, 2013	2.3/6	6.18	3	5
6	February 4, 2013	2.1/5	5.80	4	9
7	February 11, 2013	2.0/5	5.58	4	10
8	February 18, 2013	2.1/5	5.65	4	9
9	February 25, 2013	2.2/6	5.75	4	9
10	March 4, 2013	2.2/6	5.95	3	5
11	March 11, 2013	2.0/5	5.62	2	4
12	March 18, 2013	2.7/7	7.39	3	4

== See also ==
- The Biggest Loser (American TV series)
- The Biggest Loser
