= BNC Network HD =

- Country: Brunei
- Broadcast area: Brunei
- Network: Private broadcast terrestrial television
- Headquarters: Bandar Seri Begawan

Programming
- Languages: Malay and English
- Picture format: 1080i (HDTV)

History
- Launched: 31 December 2009; 16 years ago

BNC Network HD is Brunei's most popular television network. BNC was officially launched on December 31, 2009. The channel highlights the lifestyle of Brunei with the program quality and comfort of the viewing audience from all walks of life. On September 30, 2010, BNC started operating for 24 hours a day compared to other channels in Brunei that are in operation for 12 hours and above.

== History ==
The channel was set up in order to demonstrate that a private TV channel can provide the best for the people of Brunei. It was to be launched in 2009, but due to the Great Recession, it operated only temporarily so as to ensure that the channel would operate well in 2010. The channel initially introduced a number of programs from abroad and through the Malay language, but it has since begun to introduce its own programs.
