= The Biggest Loser South Africa =

- Starring: Jasmyn Asvat (Host); Bruce Claasen (Trainer); Lisa Raleigh (Trainer)
- Country of origin: South Africa
- No. of seasons: 1
- No. of episodes: 15

Production
- Producers: Red Pepper Productions; Gail MacLellan

Original release
- Network: e.tv
- Release: 7 January – 14 April 2008

The Biggest Loser South Africa is a South African reality television show which first aired from 7 January to 14 April 2008 on e.tv. The show is a spin-off of the American reality television show The Biggest Loser. The South African version features Jasmyn Asvat as the host with trainers Bruce Claasen (Blue team) and Lisa Raleigh (Red team). The premise of the show is similar to other international versions following the format of "temptation", "reward challenge", "weigh-in" and "elimination". In addition to the 15 regular episodes, there are an additional 10 episodes of The Biggest Loser Extra which focuses on the eliminated contestants.

Sharon Haarhoff was the winner of the first season, losing 61.8 kg (136 lb; 9.73 st).

== Series guide ==
Contestant	Age	Starting weight	Week											Final Results		
Contestant	Age	Starting weight	1	2	3	4	5	6	7	8	9	10	11	Final Weight	Weight Loss	Percentage
Sharon	28	135.1	130.4	127.3	124.3	120	116.8	114.3	110.9	107.9	103.9	102.6	97.8	73.3	61.8	45.74%
Asanda	25	127.8	126.1	122.3	121.3	115.3	113.5	110.9	109	106.2	102	100.6	97.6	73.1	54.7	42.80%
John	22	117.6	115.7	112.7	109.9	106.9	104.9	102.4	99.7	97.4	92.9	90.6	89	73	44.6	37.96%
Shakeel	43	134.1	129.6	125.6	121.8	116.7	113.4	112.6	110	107	102	100.4	97.8	84.6	49.5	36.91%
Jacques	24	149.5	148.8	145.1	142.4	136.7	133.5	130.1	127.2	123.2	120.1			89.6	59.9	40.07%
Gerna	35	142.2	137.6	134.2	132	126.3	123.5	120.5	117.6	116.1				95.3	46.9	32.98%
Rosemary	27	124	121.1	117.3	114.9	111.8	110.4	107	105.5					93.9	30.1	24.27%
Louis	44	165.3	164	158.9	155.5	149.2	146.7	145.9						115.5	49.8	30.13%
Sarah	28	127.8	123.3	120.9	118.7	115.9	113.2							84.8	43	33.65%
Phoebe	44	117.9	115.2	112.9	111	108	107.1							73.5	44.4	37.66%
Mpho	29	112.5	110.1	108.2	108.1	104.4								87	25.5	22.67%
Noorashia	25	102.7	105.8	103.1	101.6									88.8	13.9	13.53%
Adil	24	152.3	149.8	147.2										140.8	11.5	7.55%
Khanysile	28	137.5	139.4											126.8	10.7	7.78%

Teams
Member of Bruce's team
Member of Lisa's team

- Sarah had to withdraw due to an injury in Wk 6.
- Louis won The Biggest Loser Extra, a second-chance game to reenter the competition, which allowed him to return in Wk 10, but was eliminated in Wk 11 due to the challenge.
- The 10th weigh-in happened in Wk 11 with no elimination, and it was never shown.

Game
Last person eliminated before the finale
Winners
R250,000 and a R10,000 gift voucher from Truworths. (among the finalists)
R50,000 (among the eliminated players)
Week's Biggest Loser (Team or Individuals)
