= Marele câștigător =

- Created by: Dave Broome
- Presented by: Daiana Anghel (2010)
- Starring: Florin Uceanu (2010); Cori Gramescu (2010)
- Country of origin: România
- No. of seasons: 1
- No. of episodes: 13

Production
- Running time: 84 Minutes (120 Minutes incl. commercials)

Original release
- Network: Antena 1
- Release: September 23, 2010

Marele câștigator is a Romanian reality game show that debuted on Antena 1 September 23, 2010. The show features obese people competing to win a cash prize by losing the highest percentage of weight relative to their initial weight.

== Premise ==
Each season of The Biggest Loser starts with a weigh-in to determine the contestants' starting weights, which serve as the baseline for determining the overall winner.

The contestants are grouped into teams of two, each wearing separate colored T-shirts. Depending on the season a team may work with a specific trainer or all trainers may work with all contestants. The trainers are responsible (in conjunction with medical personnel retained by the show) for designing comprehensive workout and nutrition plans and teaching them to the contestants. However, the contestants are individually responsible for implementing the principles taught.

During an episode, various challenges and temptations (see below) are featured. Those who win a particular challenge are given special privileges, such as a weight advantage for the next weigh-in or even full immunity from being voted off the show.

Each week culminates in another weigh-in to determine which team has lost the most weight for that week, in percentage of total weight lost. The team that has lost the least percentage during that week (known as "falling below the yellow line", which refers to a line featured on a video screen showing the cutoff between safety and being at-risk) will have one member voted off (unless the team consists of only one remaining member, in which case there is no vote). The vote is usually made by the other teams, though some episodes feature one team making the decision alone. Some episodes feature a second, "red line"; if a contestant falls below the red line the contestant is automatically off the show with no vote. Other episodes allow for the contestants, if successfully meeting a goal at the weigh-in, to all receive immunity for the week.

When the number of contestants has shrunk to a predetermined smaller number (unknown to the contestants), the teams are dissolved and the contestants compete one-on-one against each other.

The season finale features both the contestants remaining on the show and those sent home early; the latter are brought back for the final show. Those sent home early compete for a smaller prize while those on the show compete for a larger prize and the title of "The Biggest Loser".

== Seasons ==
Airdates	Ep#	Contestants	Synopsis	Marele câștigător	At-Home Winner
Season 1
September 23, 2010 – December 16, 2010	13	20	Featured 18 contestants divided into two teams, the Red team and the Blue team. The Red Team was coached by trainer Cori Gramescu, while The Blue Team was coached by trainer Florin Uceanu. The eventual winner of the $25,000 grand prize was Grațian.	Grațian Stan	Ruxandra
