= Sarimah Ibrahim =

Irish-born Malaysian actress and singer

- ساريمه إبراهيم
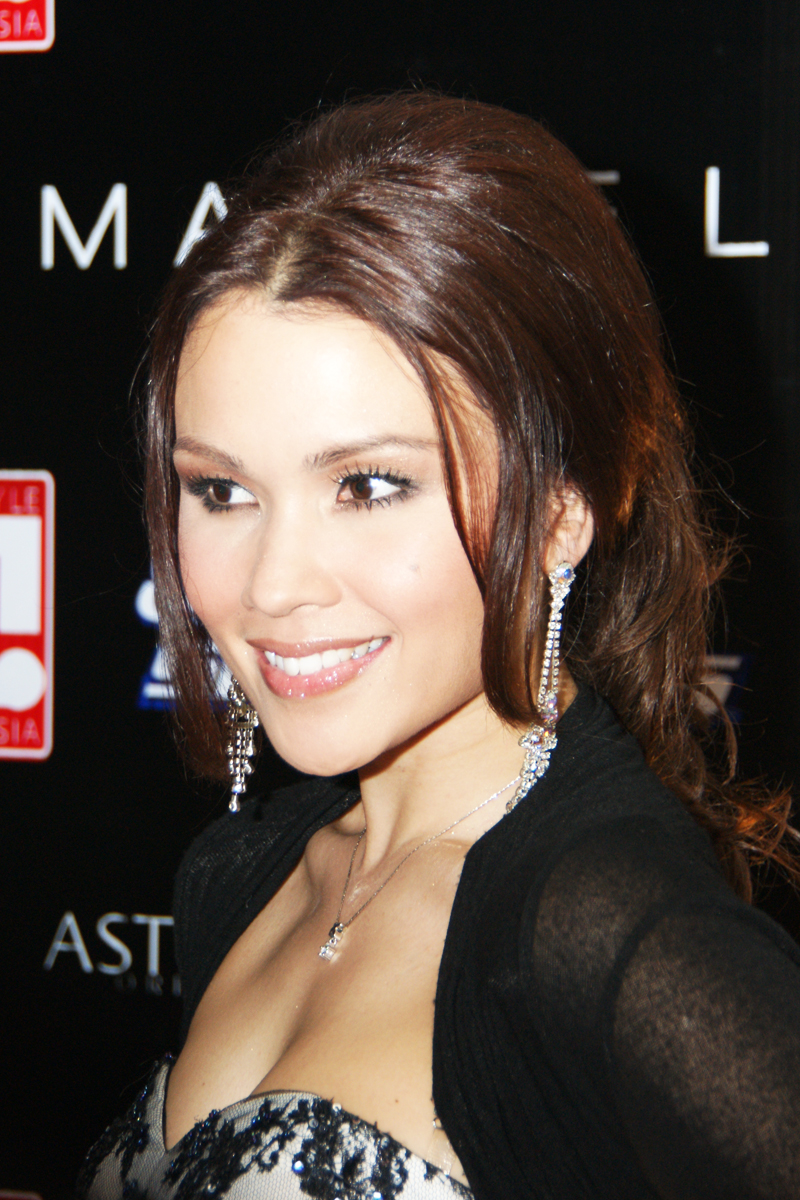
- Sarimah in 2008
- Born: 19 February 1978 (age 48); Dublin, Ireland
- Education: HELP University
- Occupations: Television host; radio announcer; actress; singer
- Years active: 1998–present
- Spouses: Amir Andrew Abdullah (m. 2006; div. 2009); Tunku Nadzimuddin bin Tunku Mudzaffar (m. 2015)
- Children: 1

Sarimah binti Ibrahim (born 19 February 1978) is a Malaysian television host, radio announcer, actress and singer.

== Personal life ==
Sarimah was born on 19 February 1978 in Dublin, Ireland to a Malaysian father of Malay and Chinese descent, Ibrahim Ahmad who hailed from Batu Pahat, Johor and an Irish mother who is of Irish and Italian descent, Elizabeth Hanlon from Kilkenny, Ireland who converted from Catholicism to Islam prior to her marriage. She is the eldest of four siblings. She spent her secondary school years at the Emirates International School in Dubai, UAE. She also attends Wesley College, Dublin where she obtained her O-Levels. Sarimah holds an Advanced Diploma in Psychology from College of Allied Educators in Singapore and Bachelor's Degree of Psychology (Hons) from HELP University in Malaysia.

== Career ==
In 2001, she released her debut album "Sarimah". winning her Best Breakthrough Artiste at AIM Awards 2002. In 1998, she became the first Female Disney Channel Asia Host. In 2009 she became the first Malaysian celebrity to host the first season of The Biggest Loser Asia on Hallmark Channel Asia. She has won several awards as TV Host including Anugerah Seri Angkasa as Best TV Presenter in 2011. She continued her recording artist career with releasing a self produced English single 'You On My Mind' in 2013 and a Bahasa Malaysia single of 'Destinasiku' in 2016.

Expanding her artistic range and reach, Sarimah joined two popular Breakfast Show's as a radio announcer for Red FM alongside Lil Kev and Mix FM radio stations for its flagship breakfast programme the Mix Breakfast Show alongside Rod for two years.

Sarimah went on to be the first Malaysian Celebrity Host given her own Talk show "The Sarimah Show" aired during primetime on national TV station TV3 in 2017.

In order to continue flourishing her acting career, Sarimah has starred in an Astro Ria TV series as herself in "Jack Yusof" with Malaysian actor Rosyam Nor and as a human rights lawyer Lydia, who defends daughter and friends from a sexual predator/lecturer in a Astro Premier TV series known as Riot!.

Recent media articles reveal Sarimah has set her sights further afield, reportedly undergoing tutelage from an Irish acting coach Gerry Grennell who has "worked with the likes of Marlon Brando, Meryl Streep, Natalie Portman, Sean Penn, Tom Cruise, Josh Brolin, Cillian Murphy, Bruce Willis, Anne Hathaway, Matt Damon, Brian Cox, Ewan McGregor and Orlando Bloom. Johnny Depp and Andrew Garfield have both been frequent collaborators (“If you are lucky enough to be taught by Gerry you should listen," Garfield once said), as was the late Heath Ledger," wrote Alex Ritman for the Hollywood Reporter.

== Marriage and issue ==
In 2006, Sarimah was married to an Australian man, Amir Andrew Abdullah (né Andrew John Browning) but the couple divorced on 15 May 2009.

In April 2015, she married His Highness Tunku Nadzimuddin bin Tunku Mudzaffar (also known as Tunku Jamie), a grandson of the tenth Yang di-Pertuan Besar of Negeri Sembilan, Tuanku Ja’afar ibni Almarhum Tuanku Abdul Rahman and Tunku Ampuan Najihah. Her father-in-law is Tunku Mudzaffar bin Tunku Mustapha, the Tunku Kecil Besar and her mother-in-law is Tunku Naquiah binti Almarhum Tuanku Ja'afar, the Tunku Dara.

Prior to their marriage, they were engaged on 27 September 2014 and had a private wedding reception at one of the prestigious hotels in Kuala Lumpur.

Sarimah and Tunku Jamie has a daughter together named Tunku Sofia Najihah. She was born on 19 July 2019.

== Discography ==
- Sarimah (2001)
- You on My Mind (2014) Simon J Bailey
- Harapan (2017) Yayasan Zuriat Care

== Filmography ==
=== Film ===
Year	Title	Role	Notes
1998	Puteri Impian 2	Lisa	Debut film appearance
2000	Mimpi Moon	Lin	
2003	Janji Diana	Sabrina	
2003	MX3	Marisa	Special guest
2005	Gerak Khas 3 The Movie	Inspector Farah	
2014	Apokalips X	Zara	Special appearance
2026	"Pewaris Susuk"	Saroja	
2026	"Konspirasi"	Dato Suraya	

=== Television series ===
Year	Title	Role	TV channel	Notes
2023	Jack Yusof	Herself	Astro Ria	
2023	RIOT!	Lydia	Astro Premier	
2024	Lelaki Itu	Sharifah Qaidah	TV3	
2024	Ternyata Sebuah Bahagia	Datin Jeanice	Astro Ria	
2026	Bila Cinta Menjadi Dosa	Eva	TV3	

=== Television ===
Year	Title	Role	TV channel	Notes
1996	The Attic Show	Herself	TV2	
1998	”Disney Buzz”	Presenter	The Disney Channel	First Asian Female Presenter
1999	The RIM Chart Show	Host	NTV7	
1999–2001	KIDS@NTV7	Herself	NTV7	Children's weekend entertainment show
2000	The Oreo Zone	Herself	TV3	Game show
2001	Malaysia 2020	Host	TV2	Political Talk Show
2003	Anugerah Juara Lagu 18	Host	TV3	Live broadcast
2004	Anugerah Juara Lagu 19	Host	TV3	Live broadcast
2006	Galaksi	Host	TV9	Talk show
2007	IKON	Host		Regional singing competition (Malaysia, Indonesia, Philippines and Singapore)
2008	Diari Akademi Fantasia	Host	Astro Ria	
2008	Radar AF7	Host	Astro Ria	Segments of larger programme Akademi Fantasia 7
2009	Diari Akademi Fantasia	Host	Astro Ria	Segments of larger programme Akademi Fantasia 7
2009	Tirai Akademi Fantasia 7	Host	Astro Ria	Segments of larger programme Akademi Fantasia 7
2009	Tangkap Muat	Host	Astro Ria	A fashion makeover show
2009	The Biggest Loser Asia	Host	Hallmark Channel Asia	
2010	Akademi Fantasia 8	Host	Astro Ria	Weekly concerts only
2012	Tourism Malaysia Video	Host		
2012	CNN Go on Air: Kuala Lumpur	Herself - Presenter	CNN	
2014	Football Focus with MYEG	Host	Astro Supersport	
2015	Bella	Host	NTV7	Talk show
2015	Sarimah’s 2 Sen Webshow	Host	Feefo.tv	Webseries
2017	The Sarimah Show	Host	TV3	Talk Show
2018	AJL 31 Anugerah Juara Lagu 2017 Host “Awak Ok?” Mental Health Awareness Show	Herself	Online Selangor Government	
2022	Vazz Vaganza	Host	Astro Ria	with Keanu Azman
2022	FFM32	Host	TV2	with Awal Ashaari
2023	Anugerah Ikon Sukan Harian Metro	Host	TV9	with Fahrin Ahmad

== Endorsements ==
Year	Products	Notes
2009	The Body Shop	
2017–2019	Thrill Make Up	
2017–2018	Dynamo	

== Awards and nominations ==
Year	Awards	Category	Result
1998	Anugerah Media Hiburan	—N/a	Won
1999	New Straits Times	Coolest Local Personality	Won
1999	14th Malaysian Film Festival (FFM)	Best Supporting Actress	Nominated
2002	9th Music Industry Awards Malaysia (AIM)	Best New Artist	Won
2002	For Him Magazine (FHM)	Sexiest Women in the World	Nominated
2002	ERA Awards	Best Breakthrough Artist	Won
2005	9th Anugerah Skrin	Best Television Presenter	Nominated
2011	Anugerah Sri Angkasa	Best Television Host	Won
