= The Biggest Loser (Dutch TV series) =

- De Afvallers
- Presented by: Marlayne Sahupala
- Starring: Jessica Galle (1); Mo Achahboun (1–2); Imro Beuk (1–5); Lenny Versteegden (1); Yneke Vocking (2–5); Sandra van de Kamp (2); Gianni Romme (3); Barbara de Loor (3–4); Hein Vergeer (4–5)
- Narrated by: Bart Ettekoven
- Country of origin: Netherlands
- No. of seasons: 5

Original release
- Network: SBS6
- Release: 31 August 2005 – 2007

De Afvallers (literal translation: The Slimmers) is a Dutch reality television series which first premiered on SBS6. The series is a spin-off of the American reality television series The Biggest Loser and the SBS6 weight-loss series Big Diet, which was canceled after two seasons due to low ratings.

== Format ==
Over the course of three months, four families must lose as much weight as possible, with the winning family receiving a vacation to a distant destination (Brazil or South Africa). The show attempts to address not only weight problems, but also the psychological problems and life style changes. The participating families have a trainer to guide them through the process.

== Seasons ==
=== Season 1 ===
First aired 31 August 2005

- Daan (43) and Irma (37) Steenkamp with children Michael (14) and Nick (11). Coach Jessica Galle. Winner trip to Brazil.
- Frank (43) and Marianne (42) van den Broek with children Jeroen (18) and Alex (16). Coach: Mo Achahboun.
- Karel (50) and Bets (49) Huygens with children Barbara (25) and Berry (23). Coach: Imro Beuk.
- Herman (63) and Moraima (43) Neut with children Ailyne (22) and Swendy (18). Coach: Lenny Versteegden.

The season finale was watched by 1.6 million viewers at its peak.

=== Season 2 ===
First aired 8 March 2006

- Bert (48) and Grietje (45) Bakker with children Bert (23) and Akke (20). Coach: Yneke Vocking. Winner trip to Brazil.
- Pieter (44) and Anneloes (42) Kamoen with children Bo (17) and Nick (14). Coach: Imro Beuk.
- Sylvia Berkhout (44) with children Michael (25), Laura (23) and Suzanne (18). Coach: Mo Achahboun.

=== Season 3 ===
First aired 13 September 2006

- Marco (38) and Suzy (37) van Boxtel with children Niels (9) and Narda (8). Coach: Yneke Vocking. Winner trip to South Africa.
- René (45) and Rikkie (44) de Wit with children Rénie (15) and Bart (14). Coach: Imro Beuk.
- Henri (41) and Margriet (36) with children Edward (13) and heal (11). Coach: Gianni Romme.
- Marja Mulder (50) with daughters Bianca (31), Diana (29) and Saskia (24). Coach: Barbara de Loor.

The van Boxtel family from Tilburg won the final. The children, Niels and Narda, will appear in the new movie ZOOP in South America.

=== Season 4 ===
First aired 21 February 2007

- This is a special version of the show, called De afvallers met Sterren (The Slimmers with Stars), featuring eight famous Dutch participants.

Name	Famous for	Weight	Target Weight Loss	Coach	Actual Weight Loss	Percentage of Goal	Place
Mark Dakriet	De Notenclub	160.1 kg (353 lb)	35 kg (77 lb)	Yneke Vocking	35.8 kg (79 lb)	102.3%	1
Bob Offenberg	Singer	64 kg (141 lb)	17 kg (37 lb)	Hein Vergeer	13.6 kg (30 lb)	80%	2
Henk Pleket	De Havenzangers	92.7 kg (204 lb)	24 kg (53 lb)	Imro Beuk	17.6 kg (39 lb)	73.6%	3
Menno Köhler	6pack	166.8 kg (368 lb)	38 kg (84 lb)	Barbara de Loor	25.4 kg (56 lb)	66.8%	4
Renée de Haan	Singer	127.2 kg (280 lb)	23 kg (51 lb)	Yneke Vocking/Imro Beuk	13.4 kg (30 lb)	58.3%	5
Linda Wagenmakers	Singer	76.5 kg (169 lb)	22 kg (49 lb)	Imro Beuk	11.8 kg (26 lb)	53.6%	6
Justine Pelmelay	Singer	80.7 kg (178 lb)	24 kg (53 lb)	Hein Vergeer	11 kg (24 lb)	45.8%	7
Rachel Massing	Groeten uit de Rimboe	56.1 kg (124 lb)	15 kg (33 lb)	Barbara de Loor	5 kg (11 lb)	33.8%	8

=== Season 5 ===
First aired November 2007

- Entitled De Afvallers XXL with 60 families from twelve provinces and coaches Yneke Vocking, Imro Beuk and Hein Vergeer.

Province North Holland

First aired 13 February 2007

- Winner of this show was the family Nijmeijers.

Province Gelderland

First aired 20 February 2007

- Winner of this show was the family Schagen

Province Utrecht

First aired 27 February 2007

- Winner of this show was the family Versteeg

Province North Brabant

First aired 5 March 2007

- Winner of this show was the family Sprangers

Province Limburg

First aired 12 March 2007

- Winner of this show was the family Jansen

Province Overijssel

First aired 19 March 2007

- Winner of this show was the family Nijhof (from Goor)

Provinces Drenthe and Groningen

First aired 2 April 2007

- Winner of this show was the family Bergsma

Province Zeeland

First aired 9 April 2007

- Winner of this show was the family Sinke

Province South Holland

First aired 16 April 2007

- Winner of this show was the family Krekt

Province Friesland

First aired 23 April 2007

- Winner of this show was the family De Haan (from Ureterp)

Province Flevoland

First aired 30 April 2007

- Winner of this show was the family Van der Swaan

Finale

First aired 7 May 2007

- Grand prize winner: Family Nijmeijers
  - Father Tinus (47) initially weighed 1 November 2007 177.6 kg (392 lb). He lost 55.5 kg (122 lb) and now weighs 122.1 kg (269 lb).
  - Mother Wilma (43) initially weighed 1 November 2007 160.5 kg (354 lb). She lost 55.9 kg (123 lb) and now weighs 104.6 kg (231 lb).
  - Son Jeroen (15) initially weighed 1 November 2007 137.8 kg (304 lb). He lost 53.9 kg (119 lb) and now weighs 83.9 kg (185 lb).
  - Son Robin (19) initially weighed 1 November 2007 198 kg (437 lb). He lost 64.5 kg (142 lb) (a record for the program) and now weighs 133.5 kg (294 lb).
