= The Biggest Loser Asia season 2 =

The Biggest Loser Asia
- Season 2
- Starring: Kristy Curtis; Dave Nuku

Release
- Original network: Diva Universal (Asia)
- Original release: September 13 – December 17, 2010

Season chronology
- ← Previous; Season 1

The Biggest Loser (Season 2) is the show's second season. Marion Caunter replaces Sarimah Ibrahim as the host of the show. This season officially started airing on September 21, 2010 on Diva Universal (Asia).

== Contestants ==
Contestant	Team	Starting Weight	Status	Total votes
Desiree M. Vinoya, 31	Blue Team	122 kg	Eliminated Week 1	0
Rico Michael, 36	Blue Team	165 kg	Eliminated Week 1	0
Scott Hanna, 30	Red Team	164 kg	Eliminated Week 2	1
Nor Ziana Binti Mohd Azmi (Yana), 24	Blue Team	146 kg	Eliminated Week 3	4
Picharatch Phuntawornnawin (Peachy), 28	Blue Team	98 kg	Eliminated Week 4	3
Pattanavadee Soonsinpai (Patty), 27	Red Team	186 kg	Eliminated Week 5	3
Izana Shakira Binti Mohd Isa (Shakira), 29	Blue Team	110 kg	Eliminated Week 6	3
Manjit Kaur, 24	Blue Team	129 kg	Eliminated Week 7	3
Saw Liang Wei, 23	Red Team	180 kg	Eliminated Week 8	3
Jonathan Wong (Jon), 34	Blue Team	191 kg	Eliminated Week 9	3
Nurhafiza Binti Mohamad (Fish), 26	Red Team	96 kg	Eliminated Week 10	2
Leonardo Capati (Leo), 30	Blue Team	137 kg	Eliminated Week 11	2
Lori Granito, 43	Red Team	117 kg	Eliminated Week 12	1
Genghis Khan Enrique, 34	Red Team	162 kg	2nd Runner-Up	
Atikom Laksanapanai (Nai), 26	Red Team	137 kg	Runner-Up	
Raj Devaraj, 25	Blue Team	144 kg	The Biggest Loser	

== Weigh Ins ==
The weights are measured in Kilograms.

Contestant	Age	Starting weight	Week												Finale	Weight lost	Percentage lost
Contestant	Age	Starting weight	1	2	3	4	5	6	7	8	9	10	11	12	Finale	Weight lost	Percentage lost
RAJ	25	144	137	132	130	127	124	120	116	112	110	107	105	100	77	67	46.53%
NAI	26	137	129	125	119	116	113	109	106	103	100	103	100	94	74	63	45.99%
GENGHIS	34	162	152	151	149	143	140	135	132	128	124	121	118	115	105	57	35.19%
LORI	43	117	110	108	105	104	103	99	97	94	93	91	90	89	81	36	30.77%
LEONARDO	30	137	130	128	124	122	118	114	112	108	106	104	103		101	36	26.28%
FISH	26	96	89	87	85	82	79	76	74	72	69	68			61	35	36.46%
JONATHAN	34	191	184	180	176	173	170	166	163	159	157				141	50	26.18%
SAW	23	180	172	169	165	161	158	153	150	146					128	52	28.89%
MANJIT	24	129	122	120	117	115	112	109	108						100	29	22.48%
SHAKIRA	27	110	104	100	97	97	94	91							91	19	17.27%
PATTY	28	186	179	175	172	170	168								140	46	24.73%
PEACHY	28	98	92	90	89	89									72	26	26.53%
YANA	24	146	140	137	135										119	27	18.49%
SCOTT	30	164	149	146											108	56	34.15%
RICO	36	165	160												127	38	23.03%
DESIREE	31	122	118												92	30	24.59%
SHEILA	34	116^{1}													89	27	23.28%

Winners
$100,000 Winner (among the finalists)
$10,000 Winner (among the lose big finalists)
Winner of the highest percentage of weight lost (among the eliminated contestants)
Teams
Member of Kristy's team
Member of Dave's team
Game
Week's Biggest Loser
Immunity (Challenge or Weigh In)
Week's Biggest Loser & Immunity (Challenge)
Last person eliminated before the finale
Notes

- Manjit was originally on Kristy's Red Team but in Week 5, she switched to Dave's Blue Team
- Leonardo was the biggest loser in Week 10, because of the 3 kg advantage that he received from the temptation the night before.

1. Shiela was a competitor on the lose big program alongside Rico and Desiree.

== Weight Loss History ==
Contestant	Week												Finale
Contestant	1	2	3	4	5	6	7	8	9	10	11	12	Finale
Raj	-7	-5	-2	-3	-3	-4	**-4**	-4	-2	-3	-2	-5	-23
Nai	-8	-4	**-6**	-3	-3	-4	-3	-3	-3	+3	**-3**	**-6**	-20
Genghis	-10	-1	-2	**-6**	-3	-5	-3	-4	-4	-3	-3	-3	-10
Lori	-7	-2	-3	-1	-1	**-4**	-2	-3	-1	-2	-1	-1	-8
Leonardo	-7	-2	-4	-2	-4	-4	-2	**-4**	-2	**-2**	-1	-2	
Fish	-7	-2	-2	-3	**-3**	-3	-2	-2	**-3**	-1	-7		
Jonathan	-7	-4	-4	-3	-3	-4	-3	-4	-2	-16			
Saw	-8	-3	-4	-4	-3	-5	-3	-4	-18				
Manjit	-7	-2	-3	-2	-3	-3	-1	-8					
Shakira	-6	**-4**	-3	0	-3	-3	0						
Patty	-7	-4	-3	-2	-2	-28							
Peachy	-6	-2	-1	0	-17								
Yana	-6	-3	-2	-16									
Scott	**-15**	-3	-38										
Rico	-5	-33											
Desiree	-4	-26											

Notes

- **Bold** means that he/she was the biggest loser of the week (by percentage).

1. During Week 10, Leonardo was the biggest loser because he won the temptation the night before the weigh in which gave him a 3 kg advantage making his weight loss total 5 kg.

=== Weight loss percentage history ===
Contestant	Week												Finale
Contestant	1	2	3	4	5	6	7	8	9	10	11	12	Finale
Raj	-4.86%	-3.65%	-1.52%	-2.31%	-2.36%	-3.23%	-3.33%	-3.45%	-1.79%	-2.73%	-1.87%	4.76%	23.00%
Nai	-5.84%	-3.10%	-4.80%	-2.52%	-2.59%	-3.54%	-2.75%	-2.83%	-2.91%	+3.00%	2.91%	6.00%	21.27%
Genghis	-6.17%	-0.66%	-1.32%	-4.03%	-2.10%	-3.57%	-2.22%	-3.03%	-3.13%	-2.42%	2.48%	2.54%	8.69%
Lori	-5.98%	-1.82%	-2.78%	-0.95%	-0.96%	-3.88%	-2.02%	-3.09%	-1.06%	-2.15%	1.10%	1.11%	6.84%
Leonardo	-5.11%	-1.54%	-3.13%	-1.61%	-3.28%	-3.39%	-1.75%	-3.57%	-1.85%	-4.72%	0.96%	-1.46%	
Fish	-7.29%	-2.25%	-2.30%	-3.53%	-3.66%	-3.80%	-2.63%	-2.70%	-4.17%	-1.45%			-7.29%
Jonathan	-3.66%	-2.17%	-2.22%	-1.70%	-1.73%	-2.35%	-1.81%	-2.45%	-1.26%				-8.38%
Saw	-4.44%	-1.74%	-2.37%	-2.42%	-1.86%	-3.16%	-1.96%	-2.67%					-10.00%
Manjit	-5.43%	-1.64%	-2.50%	-1.71%	-2.61%	-2.68%	-0.92%						-6.20%
Shakira	-5.45%	-3.85%	-3.00%	0.00%	-3.09%	-3.19%							-0.00%
Patty	-3.76%	-2.23%	-1.71%	-1.16%	-1.18%								-15.05%
Peachy	-6.12%	-2.17%	-1.11%	0.00%									-17.35%
Yana	-4.11%	-2.14%	-1.46%										-10.96%
Scott	-9.15%	-2.01%											-23.17%
Rico	-3.03%												-20.00%
Desiree	-3.28%												-21.31%

== Eliminating Voting History ==
Contestant	Week 1	Week 2	Week 3	Week 4	Week 5	Week 6	Week 7	Week 8	Week 9	Week 10	Week 11	Week12
Eliminated	Desiree and Rico	Scott	Yana	Peachy	Patty	Shakira	Manjit	Saw	Jonathan	Fish	Leo	Lori
Raj	X	Scott	Yana	Peachy	X	Shakira	Manjit	X	Lori	Fish	Lori	Genghis
Nai	X	Manjit	X	X	Patty	X	X	Saw	Jonathan	Lori	Leo	Lori
Genghis	X	Patty	X	X	Lori	X	X	Saw	Jonathan	Lori	Leo	X
Lori	X	Manjit	X	X	Patty	X	X	Genghis	X	X	X	Eliminated Week 12
Leonardo	X	X	Yana	Peachy	X	Manjit	Manjit	X	Lori	Fish	X	Eliminated Week 11
Fish	X	Patty	X	X	Patty	X	X	Saw	Jonathan	X	Eliminated Week 10	
Jonathan	X	X	?	?	X	Shakira	Manjit	X	X	Eliminated Week 9		
Saw	X	Patty	X	X	?	X	X	Genghis	Eliminated Week 8			
Manjit	X	Patty	X	X	X	Shakira	Jon	Eliminated Week 7				
Shakira	X	X	Yana	Peachy	X	Jon	Eliminated Week 6					
Patty	X	Manjit	X	X	Genghis	Eliminated Week 5						
Peachy	X	X	Yana	Shakira	Eliminated Week 4							
Yana	X	X	Peachy	Eliminated Week 3								
Scott	X	Manjit	Eliminated Week 2									
Rico	X	Eliminated Week 1										
Desiree	X	Eliminated Week 1										

Immunity
X Below yellow line, unable to vote
X Not in elimination, unable to vote
? Vote not revealed
Eliminated
Last person eliminated before finale
Valid vote cast

Notes

1. During Week 1, Marion told the contestants that the two people with the lowest percentage of weight loss on the losing team would automatically be eliminated. The first competitive weigh in saw the Red Team win and Rico and Desiree from the Blue Team were sent home and there was no voting.

2. During Week 2, The Red Team reached a hung vote between Manjit and Patty, and according to the Biggest Loser Rules, the Blue team had the power to vote anyone out; which in this case was Scott.
