= Biggest Loser Jeetega =

Indian reality television series

- Country of origin: India
- Original language: Hindi

Production
- Running time: 55 minutes

Original release
- Network: Sahara One

Biggest Loser Jeetega is an Indian reality series based on America's The Biggest Loser but adapted to the needs of the Indian market. It was hosted by Suniel Shetty and aired on Sahara One.

== Synopsis ==
The show featured sixteen obese contestants from India, who competed with each other to lose the most weight. The contestants were divided into two teams, where each was assigned a trainer. Andrew Leipus, former physiotherapist to the Indian Cricket Team was the overall trainer and he was joined by Deepika Mehta and Yusef Khan. Varun Shivdasani was the program's chef.

Sandeep Sachdev was the winner of Season 1.
