= The Biggest Loser Asia season 1 =

The Biggest Loser Asia
- Season 1
- Starring: Kristy Curtis; Dave Nuku

Release
- Original network: Hallmark Channel (Asia)
- Original release: November 24, 2009 – March 9, 2010

Season chronology
- Next → Season 2

The Biggest Loser Asia is a reality television series that began broadcasting on the Hallmark Channel in Asia on November 24, 2009. The show is a spin-off of the American programme The Biggest Loser, in which overweight and obese contestants attempt to lose weight for a large sum of money. David Gurnani emerged as the champion of the first season, winning US$100,000 and Renault sponsored by TC Euro Cars. The first season was recorded at the A Famosa Resort in Malacca, Malaysia during late 2009. It is hosted by Malaysian television personality, Sarimah Ibrahim. The trainers are Kristy Curtis, who is the Group Exercise Manager from Fitness First Australia and Dave Nuku, who is the Fitness First Asia's Regional Fitness Manager will train the red and blue team, respectively.

== Contestants ==
After the audition, 30 contestants were brought to the filming location. From there, 16 contestants were chosen by the trainers after an elimination challenge. The other 14 who were not chosen were sent home.

Contestant^{1}	Team^{2}	Starting Weight	Status	Total votes
Desmond Charles, 31	Red Team	123 kg	Quit Week 1	0
Delfin Bacho (Del), 38	Red Team	143 kg	Removed Week 2	0
Nurai'Sha Binti Hassan (Aisha), 35	Red Team	109 kg	Eliminated Week 2	4/7
Leonore Lorelei Veronica Hipe Llamas III (Goddess), 33	Blue Team	81 kg	Eliminated Week 3	4/8
Garry Holden, 41	Red Team	120 kg	Eliminated Week 4	3/6
Damietha Mataram, 28	Blue Team	97 kg	Eliminated Week 5	4/6
Rashmi Jaiswal, 32	Red Team	117 kg	Eliminated Week 6	3/5
Nadia Yusof, 32	Red Team	133 kg	Eliminated Week 7	3/4
Mohammad Hafiz Bin Amat, 25	Blue Team	167 kg	Eliminated Week 8	3/6
Christine White, 27	Red Team	128 kg	Eliminated Week 9	3/6
Kevin Yue, 27	Red Team	215 kg	Eliminated Week 10	3/5
Suthat Charnvises (Tony), 36	Blue Team	136 kg	Eliminated Week 11	3/4
Marilyn Tay, 30	Blue Team	158 kg	Eliminated Week 12	0^{4}
Martha Lai, 19	Blue Team	127 kg	3rd Runner-Up	
Aaron Mokhtar, 30	Blue Team	159 kg	2nd Runner-Up	
Carlo Miguel^{3}, 32	Red Team	132 kg	Runner Up	
David Gurnani, 25	Blue Team	157 kg	The Biggest Loser	

1. The contestants' name on the weigh-in screen may different

2. Starting in week 9, the teams were then dissolved and the contestants will compete as individuals in the Black Team

3. Carlo filled in Del's vacated spot after he was removed in Episode 2

4. The yellow line determined the elimination. Marilyn was in the 4th place, but Martha's immunity meant Marilyn would be below the yellow line and was eliminated

=== At home contestants ===
Contestant	Starting Weight
Shen Ow, 26	95 kg
Zul Mohammad "Big Zul", 32	200 kg
Amanpreet Kaur, 19	142 kg
Austine Casenas, 35	134 kg (2nd Place)
Ruby Rodriguez-Aquino, 43	96 kg (4th Place)
Perfecto Arturo Dillera, 32	158 kg (3rd Place)
Nurasjikin Binti Azman, 25	116 kg
Herukh Jethwani, 26	139 kg
Jonathan Pravin, 19	138 kg
Amreek Singh, 33	128 kg
Simran Kaur Hari Singh, 23	154 kg
Zenny Salihuddin, 19	104 kg (Winner)
Alicia Wing (Allie), 46	124 kg

At the finale, it was revealed that the contestants were secretly having their own competition, each having their own Fitness First trainers. The top four were announced. Ruby lost 20 kg (20.83%), P.A. (his nickname) lost 36 kg (22.78%), Austine lost 37 kg (27.61%) and Zenny lost 33 kg (31.73%). She won $10,000, $2,000 courtesy of PayPal and a lifetime membership in Fitness First. Her trainer, Fidie, won a trip to Gold Coast, Australia with $1000 allowance.

== Weigh-ins ==
The weights are measured in Kilograms.

Contestant	Age	Starting weight	Week											Finale	Weight lost	Percentage of Weight Lost	Percentage of Fat Lost	Total
Contestant	Age	Starting weight	1	2	3	4	5	6	7	8	9	10	11	Finale	Weight lost	Percentage of Weight Lost	Percentage of Fat Lost	Total
DAVID	25	157	144	140	135	129	125	122	122	114	112	106	102	74	83	53%	45%	98
CARLO	32	132	127	122	120	116	114	110	107	104	102	93	90	83	49	37%	27%	64
AARON	30	159	149	146	141	137	135	131	129	122	119	115	113	99	60	38%	25%	63
MARTHA	19	127	119	117	113	111	109	109	106	101	101	98	97	87	40	31%	18%	49
MARILYN	30	158	149	145	141	137	136	134	130	125	122	119	116^{3}					
TONY	36	136	126	126	121	120	122	112	112	106	103	99						
KEVIN	27	215	203	200	194	191	188	184	181	177	174							
CHRISTINE	27	128	119	117	113	111	109	105	103	102								
HAFIZ	25	167	153	149	145	141	138	134	132									
NADIA	32	133	126	124	119	117	115	111										
RASHMI	32	117	111	108	106	105	103											
DAMIETTA	28	97	93	90	X^{2}	88												
GARRY	41	120	113	110	106													
LEONORE	33	81	75	73														
AISHA	35	109	102															
DEL	38	143	136^{1}															
DESMOND	31	123																

Teams
Member of Kristy's team
Member of Dave's team

Game
Week's Biggest Loser
Immunity (Challenge)
Week's Biggest Loser & Immunity (Challenge)
Last person eliminated before the finale

Notes
1. Since Carlo, who took Del's spot, didn't go through the entire week, Del's weight loss was added to the Red Team's total.
2. Mietta was not weighed since she was taken to the hospital for a blood test due to a fever.
3. Marilyn was immediately eliminated for having the lowest percentage in the Elimination Weigh-In. She came in 4th place, but was pushed below the line by Martha, who had immunity

=== Weight Loss History ===
Contestant	Week											Finale
Contestant	1	2	3	4	5	6	7	8	9	10	11	Finale
David	-13	-4	-5	**-6**	**-4**	-3	-0	**-8**	-2	-6	**-4**	-28
Carlo	-5	**-5**	-2	-4	-2	-4	-3	-3	-2	**-9**	-3	-7
Aaron	-10	-3	-5	-4	-2	-4	-2	-7	-3	-4	-2	-14
Martha	-8	-2	-4	-2	-2	-0	-3	-5	-0	-3	-1	-10
Marilyn	-9	-4	-4	-4	-1	-2	**-4**	-5	-3	-3	-3	
Tony	-10	-0	-5	-1	+2	**-10**	-0	-6	-3	-4		
Kevin	-12	-3	**-6**	-3	-3	-4	-3	-4	-3			
Christine	-9	-2	-4	-2	-2	-4	-2	-1				
Hafiz	**-14**	-4	-4	-4	-3	-4	-2					
Nadia	-7	-2	-5	-2	-2	-4						
Rashmi	-6	-3	-2	-1	-2							
Damietta	-4	-3	X	-2								
Garry	-7	-3	-4									
Goddess	-6	-2										
Aisha	-7											
Del	-7											
Desmond												

Notes

- **Bold** means that he/she was the biggest loser of the week.

== Elimination voting history ==
Name	Week 2	Week 3	Week 4	Week 5	Week 6	Week 7	Week 8	Week 9	Week 10	Week 11	Week 12
Eliminated	Aisha	Goddess	Garry	Damietta	Rashmi	Nadia	Hafiz	Christine	Kevin	Tony	Marilyn
David	X	Goddess	X	Damietta	X	X	Hafiz	Christine	Kevin	Martha	X
Carlo	?	X	Rashmi	X	Rashmi	Nadia	X	Sarimah^{3}	Martha	Tony	X
Aaron	X	Goddess	X	Damietta	X	X	Hafiz	?	Kevin	Tony	X
Martha	X	Goddess	X	Damietta	X	X	?	Christine	X	X	X
Marilyn	X	?	X	Damietta	X	X	Hafiz	Christine	Kevin	Tony	Eliminated Week 12^{4}
Tony	X	Tony	X	X^{1}	X	X	?	?	?	X	Eliminated Week 11
Kevin	Aisha	X	Nadia	X	Rashmi	Nadia	X	X	X	Eliminated Week 10	
Christine	Rashmi	X	Garry	X	Rashmi	Nadia	X	X	Eliminated Week 9		
Hafiz	X	?	X	?	X	X	I ♥ Christine^{2}	Eliminated Week 8			
Nadia	Aisha	X	Garry	X	Christine	Kevin	Eliminated Week 7				
Rashmi	Aisha	X	Garry	X	Christine	Eliminated Week 6					
Damietta	X	Goddess	X	?	Eliminated Week 5						
Garry	Aisha	X	Rashmi	Eliminated Week 4							
Goddess	X	Damietta	Eliminated Week 3								
Aisha	Rashmi	Eliminated Week 2									

Immunity
X Below yellow line, unable to vote
X Not in elimination, unable to vote
? Vote not revealed
Eliminated
Last person eliminated before finale
Valid vote cast

Notes

1. Tony could not attend the elimination at Week 5 as he was in the Prince Court Medical Hospital due to kidney stones.

2. Hafiz did not want to write anyone of the Blue Team's name. Instead, he wrote his affections for Christine on the card.

3. Carlo could not bear to vote for either of his countrymen, so instead, he ended up voting for the host to make Biggest Loser history.

4. Marilyn was automatically eliminated for falling below the yellow line in the Elimination Weigh-In.

== Episode Summaries ==
=== Episode 101: "The Relentless Pursuit" ===
The episode shows the auditions held at the Fitness First outlets in Malaysia, Singapore, Indonesia and the Philippines.

=== Episode 102: "Bring It On!" ===
The chosen 30 were taken to the a field in A Famosa Resort in Malacca, Malaysia, where they were greeted by the host, who, later, told them to pair up and face an on-the-spot elimination challenge. They would perform three different forms of exercises and the trainers will choose 8 people each to join their team. The Red Team consists of Del, Aisha, Garry, Christine, Desmond, Rashmi, Nadia and Kevin, while The Blue Team consists of Leonore (a.k.a. Goddess), David, Marilyn, Tony, Damietha, Aaron, Martha and Hafiz, a paramedic who lost his job to get there. The rest were sent home.

That night the team checked out the villa. The next day they were given a small talk on nutrition and then taken to their first exercise, where The Reds were facing a hard time with the notably tough exercise, while Damietha fell into a pothole and twisted her ankle in the simpler workout, which resulted in her taken to the hospital. After training, the humorous Desmond went to Kristy and said that he was homesick, felt pressure from being looked up to and the exercise was too hard. Kristy told him to think long and hard with his decision. That night, he phoned "baby" to consult. She said that she missed him and should return home. He was still unsure what to do. The next day, Damietha return from the hospital, with a crutch.

The team were introduced to their gym were taken to their first ever weigh-in to find out their starting weights. Desmond was last to weigh and announced that he has decided to pull out of the show, stating that his heart is not there. He left the room, leaving a sad Red Team behind.

=== Episode 103: "Red Alert!" ===
The Red Team became even more demoralized because Del, who initially injured his arm during a Typhoon before the show having to leave for a surgery, as he had to have surgery for his then dislocated elbow. Kristy surprised them the next day by bringing back Carlo, who was originally one of the 14 who were not selected. In his first workout, he was shown to be strong.

In the first challenge, a team member will race up a flight of stairs to a water slide at A Famosa Water World. He/She would then raise up a flag, signalling the next one to go. The last member will race up and go down the slide. The winning team will spend the day at the park. Damietha sat out due to her recovering ankle. The Blue Team had a lead which grew stronger and they finished before the last Red, Carlo, even took his turn.

Kevin, during a workout, had a headache and then suffered hypoglycemia in bed. He was sent to the ambulance and returned normal the next day.

At the weigh-in, Goddess, the smallest Blue sat out. Since Carlo did not have as much time of training, Del's weight loss was added to the Red Team's. They led the entire weigh-in, until David, second to last, lost 13 kg. Hafiz lost 14 kg, giving his team victory, 68 to 60 and the title of the week's Biggest Loser. After rumours, deals and discussions, Rashmi received 2 votes for being the weakest while Aisha received 4 votes as her members thought she was strong enough to continue her journey at home. She said to us that she wanted to be at 50 kg.

=== Episode 104: "The Plateau Effect" ===
Kristy is still proud of her team. She reminded them that there will eventually be a plateau in the Blue Team's weight loss and to keep focus. Meanwhile, The Blue Team played a convincing prank on Dave, telling him they lost the weigh-in, its fake details and voted out Hafiz, who later surprised him by sneaking in through a door behind him. He was happy and they were then reminded not to be confident with their victory.

One night, Carlo made a Skype call to her wife and discovered that she was pregnant with their first child. He told everyone and they were happy for him. Later, they suggested names for the baby.

The challenge had 3 team members taking turns running across a paintball field while an opposing team member shoots paintballs at him/her. Marilyn and Mietta sat out. The Blue Team won with five hits to one, earning themselves a night bowling at the A Famosa's Cowboy Town, while The Red Team were punished to reluctantly clean the villa, both sides.

The weigh-in had The Blue Team sitting out their two smallest members, Mietta and Goddess. All the numbers appeared lower than last week. Tony eventually needed 2 kilos for a second win. He lost nothing and The Red Team won 18–17.

While discussing about the elimination, the team agreed that the voting will be done by integrity. It ended up 4 votes to Goddess, 1 for Mietta, and a vote from Tony to himself, which Sarimah said to be a Biggest Loser first. Goddess than had and intense, emotional blow-up, stating that she was the outcast, the vote were based on popularity and accused the team deliberately alienated her. They argued until Sarimah stopped her at a point. In her parting words, she said if they lose, they'll know one of the reasons why: it's because they voted out the wrong girl.

=== Episode 105: "Two Face" ===
Dave is disappointed with the loss and urges the Blue Team to work harder, while Kristy is thrilled with her team still fully intact and overjoyed that they have finally won something. She reminded them that the competition has only begun and that things will be heating up in the weeks to come.

Having lost the weigh-in, Dave pushes the blue team even harder and introduces the TRX workout that uses a person's own body weight in a resistance training regime. Dave is encouraged at the progress of each blue team member. Despite a more confident red team, Kristy is concerned at the amount of effort that the women in red are putting into training. At the villa, Kristy introduced both the teams a valuable tool in the form of the Biggest Loser Club Asia website, where one can calculate the amount of calories consumed by a person, and the amount of calories being worked off on a daily basis.

The Challenge had 2 male and 2 female members from each team in a race consisting taking turns riding a Malacca trishaw 200 meters down a stretch of road and make a U-turn before returning to the finishing line. Both trainers will ride with them as passengers and to provide moral support. The Red Team had an early lead. At one point, Carlo said that The Blue Team is not starting at the official starting point. David, annoyed by Carlo's comments, throws a water bottle to the ground in anger. Tony apologises to Carlo for David's blow up. Rashmi last red, struggled with her trishaw. The Blue Team took the lead while Rashmi's bicycle chain had fallen off, giving The Blue Team another victory. They were rewarded with a Halloween celebration at the A Famosa's Cowboy Town.

The next day, Damietta was suffering from a high fever. Despite taking medication and getting a dose of antibiotics from the doctor the night before, her condition still does not improve. The doctor becomes concerned that Damietta could be suffering from Dengue fever and decides that it is best to send her to the hospital for a blood test. Both teams experienced a rigorous bootcamp-style training in the mud and rain for their last chance workout.

At the weigh-in, since Damietta still has not returned from the hospital, she was automatically excluded from the weigh-in, evening out the numbers between the blues and reds. Once again Tony needed 2 kg. He lost 5 and The Blue Team eventually won 27-23.

As the Red Team deliberated on elimination, the women are convinced that Garry is two-faced and has talked behind their backs about his fellow red team members. Garry however defended himself, claiming that the accusations are lies and that he had been “played” by Rashmi who started the rumours. Garry also brought up the Filipino alliance and argued that the alliance has to be broken if any of the other non Filipino red team members wanted a chance in the game, but Carlo responded, that despite looking out for his fellow Pinoys, “there are no free rides in this red house, if we don't pull calories, if we don't put in the performances then that has to be addressed.” Rashmi, is also concerned of her place in the red team, knowing that it was her fault that the red team lost the challenge and that she had proven to be the weakest member.

Garry had 3 votes, Rashmi had 2 when Kevin had to give the deciding vote. Thinking that she missed her children he voted for Nadia, resulting in Garry's elimination. He left the red team with his blessings.

== Episodes ==
The final show that witnessed David Gurnani winning The First Biggest Loser Asia lost more than 80 kg
