= The Biggest Winner =

Arabic reality television show

- Arabic: الرابح الأكبر; Ar-Rabeh Al-Akabar
- Presented by: Carolina De Oliveira
- Starring: Hani Abu Al-Naja (2006-2007); Zaina Habi (2006); Patci Saliba (2007); Noor Khatab (2008-2009); Lina Rahma (2008-2009); Pascale Saad
- Country of origin: Lebanon
- Original language: Arabic
- No. of seasons: 4

Production
- Running time: 90 minutes

Original release
- Network: MBC 1
- Release: April 29, 2006 – 2009

The Biggest Winner (Arabic: الرابح الأكبر) is an Arabic reality television show that began broadcasting on MBC 1 in 2006 and finished in 2009. Filming took place in Lebanon. The show is an adaptation of the American reality television show The Biggest Loser. The show features a host, personal trainers, and a dietitian who help the contestants lose weight. As of December 2009, MBC 1 has presented four seasons of the show with a total of 58 contestants from 14 Arabic countries. The show follows the journey of overweight contestants compete to win cash (and other prizes) by losing the highest percentage of their starting body weight. Reruns of the first four seasons were aired in MBC Masr.

== Seasons ==
=== Season 1 ===
This season premiered on April 29, 2006, with 14 contestants from nine Arabic countries. The contestants were divided into two teams: Blue Team and Red Team. The winner of season 1 was Jordanian Abdlallah Hamad, who was awarded 250,000 SAR and a Ford Explorer. On the reunion show, Iraqi Walid Al-Jasem won 50,000 SAR.

Contestant	Team	Status
Katherine Al-Kheder, Syria	Blue Team	Eliminated Week 1
Dalia Abualsaud, Jordan	Blue Team	Eliminated Week 2
Ahmad Al-Mehana, Kuwait	Red Team	Eliminated Week 3
Reda Mata, Lebanon	Blue Team	Eliminated Week 4
Hatem Lashain, Egypt	Red Team	Eliminated Week 5
Walead Al-Jasem, Iraq	Red Team	Eliminated Week 6
Lina Bakear, Lebanon	Red Team	Eliminated Week 7
Hadair Shabib, Egypt	Red Team	Eliminated Week 8
Darean Mahmoud, Saudi Arabia	Red Team	Eliminated Week 9
Kawthar Al-Bakar, Bahrain	Blue Team	Eliminated Week 10
Abdullah Al-Khalaki, Saudi Arabia	Blue Team	Eliminated Week 11
Finale
Nehad Al-Akhdar, Tunisia	Red Team	2nd Runner Up
Moustafa Al-Mobarak, Saudi Arabia	Blue Team	Runner Up
Abdullah Hammad, Jordan	Blue Team	The Biggest Winner

==== Teams ====
Member of Zaina's Team
Member of Hani's Team
Winners
250,000 SAR. Winner (among the finalists)
50,000 SAR. Winner (among the eliminated contestants)

=== Season 2 ===
This season premiered on October 27, 2007, with 14 contestants from 10 Arabic countries. The contestants were divided into two teams: Blue Team and Red Team. Unlike season one, in this season all members of Blue Team were men and Red Team were women. The winner of season 2 was Walid Hamid from U.A.E., who was awarded 250,000 SAR. On the reunion show, Saudi Arabian Salimah Al-Hebshi won 50,000 SAR.

Contestant	Team	Status
Ahmad Al-Zofiri , Kuwait	Blue Team	Eliminated Week 2*
Hanan Abu Hamda , Palestinian	Red Team	Eliminated Week 3
Faisal Al-Ghamdi , Saudi Arabia	Blue Team	Quit
Huwaida Al-Karteli , Morocco	Red Team	Eliminated Week 4
Ihab Al-Kholi , Egypt	Blue Team	Eliminated Week 5
Amani Mohammad , Iraq	Red Team	Eliminated Week 6
Fadol Al-Faran , Saudi Arabia	Blue Team	Eliminated Week 7
Samira Al-Oni , Algeria	Red Team	Eliminated Week 8
Salemah Al-Hebshi , Saudi Arabia	Red Team	Eliminated Week 9
Fahad Khalefa , Saudi Arabia	Blue Team	Eliminated Week 10
Ahmad Al-Bekeri , Qatar	Blue Team	Eliminated Week 11
Finale
Abir Shahada , Lebanon	Red Team	2nd Runner up
Wala Adel , Egypt	Red Team	Runner Up
Waleed Hamid , United Arab Emirates	Blue Team	The Biggest Winner

==== Teams ====
Member of Hani's Team
Member of Patci's Team
Winners
250,000 SAR. Winner (among the finalists)
50,000 SAR. Winner (among the eliminated contestants)

^{*} Fahad was eliminated in week 1 but because Fisal quit, Fahad replaced Fisal.

=== Season 3 ===
This season premiered on October 11, 2008, with 14 contestants from 10 Arabic countries. The contestants were divided into two teams: Blue Team and Red Team. The winner of season 3 was Mohammad Mazboudi from Lebanon, who was awarded 250,000 SAR. On the reunion show, Hasan Al-Rawi from Iraq won 50,000 SAR.

Contestant	Team	Status
Meshal Ahmad, Kuwait	Red Team	Eliminated Week 1
Khaled Habib, Bahrain	Blue Team	Eliminated Week 2
Mohammad Bumoza, Saudi Arabia	Red Team	Eliminated Week 3
Hasan Al-Rawi, Iraq	Blue Team	Eliminated Week 4
Suhair Zoubat, Algeria	Blue Team	Eliminated Week 5
Lamia Derazy, Bahrain	Red Team	Eliminated Week 6
Iman Al-Ali, Jordan	Red Team	Eliminated Week 7
Amr Na'es, Syria	Red Team	Eliminated Week 8
Heba Nazer, Saudi Arabia	Blue Team	Eliminated Week 9
Bothayna Al-Hedri, Morocco	Red Team	Eliminated Week 10
Rasheda Sulaiman, Egypt	Blue Team	Eliminated Week 11
Finale
Azari Hamod, Kuwait	Blue Team	2nd Ruuner Up
Mohanad Al-jeddawi, Saudi Arabia	Blue Team	Runner Up
Mohammad Mazboudi, Lebanon	Red Team	The Biggest Winner

==== Teams ====
Member of Noor's Team
Member of Lina's Team
Winners
250,000 SAR. Winner (among the finalists)
50,000 SAR. Winner (among the eliminated contestants)

=== Season 4 ===
This season premiered on September 26, 2009 and, unlike all past seasons, eight couples from six Arabic countries competed during 11 weeks. There is a relationship between each couple except the Yellow Team, who are strangers. The other teams are either siblings, spouses, or friends. The winner of season 4 was Karim Abdullah from Egypt who was awarded 250,000 SAR. On the reunion show, Orwa Al-Korah from Syria won 50,000 SAR, and for first time in the programs history the 3rd place Abdulaziz Shesha won 20,000 SAR and the 2nd place Marah Al-Korah won 30,000 SAR.

==== Contestants ====
Contestant	Couples Team	Blue vs. Red	Status	Couples Relationship
Turqi Al-Motiri, Saudi Arabia	Green Team		Eliminated Week 1	Friends
Izat Kabbi, Saudi Arabia	Green Team		Eliminated Week 1	Friends
Mushari Al-Mosbah, Kuwait	Sky Blue Team		Eliminated Week 2	Friends
Ahmad Al-Fodari, Kuwait	Sky Blue Team		Eliminated Week 2	Friends
Marilyn Saleh, Jordan	Pink Team		Eliminated Week 3	Sisters
Mealda Saleh, Jordan	Pink Team		Eliminated Week 3	Sisters
Ittidal Musa, Saudi Arabia	Yellow Team		Eliminated Week 4	Strangers
Madeline Saleh, Jordan	Yellow Team		Eliminated Week 4	Strangers
Huda Bakeesh, Morocco	Orange Team	Red Team	Eliminated Week 5	Huyam's Sister
Abdulaziz Shesha, Saudi Arabia	Purple Team	Red Team	Eliminated Week 6	Elham's Husband
Huyam Bakeesh, Morocco	Orange Team	Blue Team	Eliminated Week 7	Huda's Sister
Amgad Abdullah, Egypt	Black Team	Blue Team	Eliminated Week 8	Karim's Brother
Elham Abualsaud, Saudi Arabia	Purple Team	Blue Team	Eliminated Week 9	Abdulaziz's Wife
Madeline Saleh, Jordan	Yellow Team		Eliminated Week 10	No Relationship
Orwa Al-Korah, Syria	White Team	Red Team	Eliminated Week 11	Marah's Brother
Finale
Abdulaziz Shesha, Saudi Arabia	Purple Team	Red Team	2nd Runner Up	Elham's Husband
Marah Al-korah, Syria	White Team	Blue Team	Runner Up	Orwa's Sister
Karim Abdullah, Egypt	Black Team	Red Team	The Biggest Winner	Amgad's Brother

Winners
250,000 SAR. Winner (among the finalists)
50,000 SAR. Winner (among the eliminated contestants)

- Second place has prize 30 SAR.
- Third place has 20 SAR.

==== Weigh-ins and eliminations ====
Contestant	Age	Height	Starting BMI	Ending BMI	Starting Weight	Week											Reunion	Finale	Weight Lost	Percentage Lost
Contestant	Age	Height	Starting BMI	Ending BMI	Starting Weight	1	2	3	4	5	6	7	8	9	10	11	Reunion	Finale	Weight Lost	Percentage Lost
Karim	29	205	41.4	23.4	173.9	168.0	164.4	161.5	158.7	154.7	152.1	148.7	146.4	142.7	142.5	134.7	Weighted at Finale	98.5	-75.4	-43.36%
Marah	32	171	46.6	27.4	136.4	129.8	128.3	126.8	123.9	121.7	119.9	115.4	114.0	116.0	111.7	107.0	Weighted at Finale	80.2	-56.2	-41.20%
Abdulaziz	28	176	40.3	26.1	124.7	118.8	117.1	118.4	111.3	110.3	109.7	107.2	105.2	105.5	103.9	97.5	Weighted at Finale	80.8	-43.9	-35.20%
Orwa	23	184	44.7	27.7	151.3	145.3	142.2	139.7	136.8	133.9	130.8	126.7	124.0	120.7	117.2	113.9	93.8	Weighed at Reunion	-57.5	-38.00%
Madeline	23	154	47.2	29.7	112.0	105.5	103.1	100.9	98.2			92.3	91.4	88.6	86.4		70.5	Weighed at Reunion	-41.5	-37.05%
Elham	26	170	44.6	32.9	128.9	122.6	119.9	122.6	116.9	114.4	111.6	108.7	107.7	107.9			95.1	Weighed at Reunion	-33.8	-26.22%
Amgad	27	171	42.6	36.6	124.5	120.8	118.3	117.2	115.3	114.4	112.6	109.6	108.9				107.1	Weighed at Reunion	-17.4	-13.98%
Huyam	25	166	46.0	30.6	126.7	122.7	120.2	116.6	114.2	112.2	109.3	107.0					84.2	Weighed at Reunion	-42.5	-33.54%
Huda	28	168	48.0	32.8	135.5	130.6	128.6	127.2	123.0	122.5		115.3					92.6	Weighed at Reunion	-42.9	-31.66%
Ittidal	21	172	42.0	32.8	124.2	120.7	119.3	117.2	114.7			107.1					97.1	Weighed at Reunion	-27.1	-21.82%
Mealda	25	164	50.1	33.0	134.7	130.4	129.2	128.6				117.2					88.7	Weighed at Reunion	-46.0	-34.15%
Marilyn	20	166	45.3	34.5	124.8	120.8	120.2	117.6				109.1					95.0	Weighed at Reunion	-29.8	-23.88%
Ahmad	30	178	49.6	X	157.1	154.2	155.3					X					did not attend			
Mushari	26	180	52.8	44.5	171.0	164.4	163.7					154.8					144.2	Weighed at Reunion	-26.8	-15.67%
Turqi	25	179	40.7	34.9	130.5	131.0						122.0					111.9	Weighed at Reunion	-18.6	-14.25%
Izat	24	184	46.0	34.5	155.8	154.2						135.4					116.9	Weighed at Reunion	-38.9	-24.97%

Game
Week's Biggest Winner
Gain weight
Results from Eliminated Players Weigh in (Week 7)
X did not attend
Winners
250,000 SAR Winner (among the finalists)
50,000 SAR Winner (among the eliminated contestants)
BMI
Normal (18.5 - 24.9 BMI)
Overweight (25 - 29.9 BMI)
Obese Class I (30 - 34.9 BMI)
Obese Class II (35 - 39.9 BMI)
Obese Class III (greater than 40 BMI)
Notes
All contestant weights are in kilograms
All contestant heights are in centimetres

=== Weight Loss History ===
Contestant	Week											Finale
Contestant	1	2	3	4	5	6	7	8	9	10	11	Finale
Karim	-5.9	-3.6	-2.9	-2.8	-4.0	-2.6	-3.4	-2.3	-3.7	-0.2	-7.8	-36.2
Marah	-6.6	-1.5	-1.5	-2.9	-2.2	-1.8	-4.5	-1.4	+2.0	-4.3	-4.7	-26.8
Abdulaziz	-5.9	-1.7	+1.3	-7.1	-1.0	-0.6	-2.5	-2.0	+0.3	-1.6	-6.4	-16.2
Orwa	-6.0	-3.1	-2.5	-2.9	-2.9	-3.1	-4.1	-2.7	-3.3	-3.5	-3.3	-20.1
Madeline	-6.5	-2.4	-2.2	-2.7	-5.9			-0.9	-2.8	-2.2	-15.9	
Elham	-6.3	-2.7	+2.7	-5.7	-2.5	-2.8	-2.9	-1.0	+0.2	-12.8		
Amgad	-3.7	-2.5	-1.7	-1.9	-0.9	-1.8	-3.0	-0.7	-1.8			
Huyam	-4.0	-2.5	-3.6	-2.4	-2.0	-2.9	-2.3	-22.8				
Huda	-4.9	-2.0	-1.4	-4.2	-0.5	-7.2		-22.7				
Ittidal	-3.5	-1.4	-2.1	-2.5	-7.6			-10.0				
Mealda	-4.3	-1.2	-0.6	-11.4				-28.5				
Marilyn	-4.0	-0.6	-2.6	-8.5				-14.1				
Ahmad	-2.9	+1.1	X					X				
Mushari	-6.6	-0.7	-8.9					-10.6				
Turqi	+0.5	-9.0						-10.1				
Izat	-1.6	-18.4						-18.5				

==== Voting history ====
Name	Week										
Name	1	2	3	4	5	6	7	8	9	10	11
Eliminated	Turqi & Izat	Ahmad & Mushari	Mealda & Mareline	Ittidal & Madeline	Huda	Abdulaziz	Huyam	Amgad	Elham	Madeline	Orwa
Karim	Turqi & Izat	Ahmad & Mushari	X	X	Huda	X	X	Elham	Elham	X	Orwa
Marah	Turqi & Izat	Ahmad & Mushari	Mealda & Mareline	X	X	X	Huyam	Amgad	Elham	Madeline	X
Abdulaziz	Turqi & Izat	Ahmad & Mushari	Mealda & Mareline	X	Huda	X		Amgad	X	?	Marah
Orwa	Turqi & Izat	Ahmad & Mushari	Mealda & Mareline	X	Huda	Abdulaziz	Huyam	Amgad	Abdulaziz	Madeline	X
Madeline	Turqi & Izat	Ahmad & Mushari	Amgad & Karim	X				Elham	Elham	X	
Elham	Turqi & Izat	Ahmad & Mushari	Mealda & Mareline	X	X	X	Huyam	X	X		
Amgad	Turqi & Izat	Ahmad & Mushari	X	X	X	X	Huyam	X			
Huyam	Mealda & Mareline	Ahmad & Mushari	Mealda & Mareline	Ittidal & Madeline	X	X	X				
Huda	Mealda & Mareline	Ahmad & Mushari	Mealda & Mareline	Ittidal & Madeline	Abdulaziz						
Ittidal	Turqi & Izat	Ahmad & Mushari	Amgad & Karim	X							
Mealda	X	X	X								
Mareline	X	X	X								
Ahmad	Mealda & Mareline	X									
Mushari	Mealda & Mareline	X									
Turqi	X										
Izat	X										

X Below yellow line, unable to vote
Immunity
X Not in elimination, unable to vote
X Vote not revealed
? Immunity and Vote not revealed

== See also ==
- Obesity in Kuwait
- Obesity in Saudi Arabia
- Obesity in the United Arab Emirates
