= Carolina De Oliveira =

Lebanese actress and social activist of Brazilian native

- Carolina Emanuel De Oliveira
- Born: Damascus, Syria
- Citizenship: Lebanese (2015–present)
- Education: Jesus and Mary School
- Occupations: actress, presenter, social activist
- Years active: 1997–present
- Known for: BBC 100 Women (2016)

Carolina de Oliveira (Arabic: كارولينا دي أوليفيرا; born November 16, 1978) is a Syrian-Brazilian actress known for her appearance in Lebanese TV programs. She was named one of BBC's 100 most influential women in 2016 for her work in mental health.

== Life ==
Carolina de Oliveira was born in Damascus to a Brazilian father and a mother of Syrian/Armenian and Lebanese descent. She attended Jesus and Mary School near Beirut, Lebanon. She received a master's degree in fashion design from the University of Lyon in France. In 2006, it was rumored that she might marry Egyptian singer Ehab Tawfiq, but she said it was only a rumor. In 2013, she confirmed that she was engaged to Egyptian artist Ehab Tawfik between 2006 and 2007, but they have broken up since. During a March 2015 interview, she said she received Lebanese citizenship with the help of the Lebanese authorities.

== Work ==
De Oliveira started her television career at Future TV network in 1997. She was in Orbit TV's 'Oyoun Beirut', then went to NBN (National Broadcasting Network) in Lebanon with four other shows: "Al Sabahieh", "3al Moda" and "3al Eticket, and "Special". She became well known after she went to MBC, the Arab satellite TV channel, with "Ante", "Wakif Il Sa3a", "She Style", "Lux Fashion World" and three seasons of the reality show "The Biggest Winner", the most popular show on MBC. In 2010, Carolina moved to the news channel Al Arabiya, with "Drama Ramadan" and "Cinema in a Week". In 2009 she was in Khaled Youssef's film "Kalemni Shokran".

De Oliveira was diagnosed with bipolar disorder at the age of 34 years, and decided to speak out about the disorder. She has also supported the Ruban Rouge organization against HIV-Aids in Africa and the Middle East.

== Other websites ==
- Carolina De Oliveira on Facebook
- Carolina De Oliveira on Twitter
- Carolina De Oliveira at IMDb
