= Coyle =

Coyle is a surname of Irish origin.

== People sharing this surname ==
- Andrew Coyle (contemporary), British law professor and prison official
- Anthony Coyle (American football) (born 1996), American football player
- Bill Coyle (baseball) (1871–1941), American baseball player
- Bill Coyle (born ?), American poet
- Brendan Coyle (born 1963), English actor
- Brian Coyle (1944–1991), American gay rights activist
- Brock Coyle (born 1990) American Football Player
- Charles Delmer Coyle (1887–1954), Canadian politician from Ontario; MP from Elgin 1945–54
- Charlie Coyle (born 1992), American ice hockey player
- Charlotte Coyle (born 1982), Northern Ireland plus-size model
- Cleo Coyle or Alice Alfonsi, American author
- Colm Coyle (born 1965), Irish Gaelic football player and manager
- Connor Coyle (born 1990), Irish professional boxer
- Craig Coyle (born 1980), Scottish footballer
- Dallas Coyle (contemporary), American guitarist
- Dan Coyle, Irish athlete in men's hammer throw
- David Coyle (born 1970) Scottish guitarist and music producer
- Denise Coyle (born 1953), American politician from New Jersey; state legislator since 2008
- Diane Coyle (born 1961), English economist
- Eithne Coyle (1897–1985), Irish Republican
- Eric Coyle (born 1963), American football player
- Fay Coyle (1933–2007), Northern Ireland football player
- Frank Coyle (1886–1947), American Olympic track and field athlete
- Harold Coyle (born 1952), American author of war novels (Team Yankee)
- Henry Coyle (boxer) (born 1987), Irish boxer
- Henry Coyle (politician) (died 1979), Irish army officer and politician; TD for Mayo North
- Iain Coyle (born 1968), British TV presenter and producer
- James Coyle (rugby league) (born 1985), English rugby league player
- James Coyle (1873–1921), American Roman Catholic priest
- Joey Coyle (1953–1993), American longshoreman who found $1.2 million that had fallen from an armored car
- John Coyle (footballer) (1932–2016), Scottish football player
- John Coyle (speed skater) (born 1968), American speed skater
- Lewie Coyle (born 1995), English footballer
- Liam Coyle (born 1968), Northern Ireland football player
- Marion Coyle (born 1954), Irish member of the Provisional IRA
- Mark Coyle (born 1969), athletics director at the University of Minnesota
- Mark J. Coyle (c. 1965–2007), American political consultant
- Mary Coyle (born 1954), Canadian politician
- Matt Coyle (born 1971), English-born Australian artist and novelist
- Michael Coyle (politician) (born 1948), Northern Ireland nationalist politician; member of the Northern Ireland Assembly 2002
- Nadine Coyle (born 1985), Irish pop singer
- Owen Coyle (born 1966), Scottish-born football player playing for Ireland
- Pat Coyle (lacrosse) (born 1969), Canadian lacrosse player
- Pat Coyle (basketball) (contemporary), American basketball coach
- Reg Coyle (1917–1998), Australian Australian Rules Footballer
- Richard Coyle (born 1972), English actor
- Richard Coyle (pirate) (died 1738), English pirate
- Robert Everett Coyle (1930–2012), United States federal judge
- Robert J. Coyle, American Roman Catholic bishop
- Ronnie Coyle (born 1964), Scottish football player
- Rose Coyle (1914–1988), American beauty queen; Miss America 1936
- Ross Coyle (born 1937), American football player
- Roy Coyle (born 1946), Northern Ireland football player and coach
- T. Thorn Coyle (born 1965), American neopaganist author
- Thomas Coyle (rugby league) (born 1988), English rugby league player
- Thomas Coyle (accused of murder) (fl. 1871), Canadian acquitted of the murder of George Campbell
- Tim Coyle (born 1960), Australian cricketer
- Tommy Coyle (born 1989), British professional boxer
- Tony Coyle (South African soccer) (born 1976), South African footballer
- Tyler Coyle (born 1998), American football player
- William R. Coyle (1878–1962), American politician from Pennsylvania; U.S. representative 1925–33

== Fictional characters sharing this surname ==
- Eddie Coyle, protagonist of the novel and film The Friends of Eddie Coyle
- Malcolm Coyle, character on the American television series Oz
- Joseph Coyle, security guard at the casino in Ocean's Eleven
- Dr. Coyle, a scientist from Arms
- Coyle, a fictional military tutor in Benjamin Britten's opera Owen Wingrave and in the short story by Henry James on which it was based
- Leland Coyle, an antagonist from The Outlast Trials

== Places named Coyle ==
- Coyle, Oklahoma
- Coyle, Washington
