= Street of Dreams (musical) =

Musical based on the television series Coronation Street

- Music: Trisha Ward
- Lyrics: Trisha Ward
- Book: Trisha Ward and Damon Rochefort
- Basis: Coronation Street
- Productions: 2012, United Kingdom and Ireland tour

Street of Dreams was a musical with music and lyrics by Trisha Ward and co-written with Damon Rochefort. It was directed by John Stephenson. It was based on the television series Coronation Street and the 2011 album Coronation Street: Rogues, Angels, Heroes and Fools.

The show was originally scheduled to begin on 21 March 2012 at the Manchester Arena; however, due to the intricacy of scale involved, the opening date of the production was delayed until 9 May. The show was postponed after two performances and poor reviews. Stars including Julie Goodyear and Kevin Kennedy joined Paul O'Grady in saying they had not been paid, with the two production companies behind the musical, Reckless Entertainment and Street of Dreams Ltd, being put into administration.

== Principal roles and original cast ==
| Character | United Kingdom and Ireland tour |
|---|---|
| Narrator | Paul O'Grady |
| Bet Lynch | Julie Goodyear |
| Curly Watts | Kevin Kennedy |
| Richard Hillman | Brian Capron |
| Ken Barlow (Pre-recorded, On Screen) | Bill Roache |
| Julie Carp/Angel of the North | Katy Cavanagh |
| Young Elsie Tanner | Kym Marsh |
| Iconic Elsie Tanner | Jodie Prenger |
| Ena Sharples | Jenna Boyd |
| Dennis Tanner | Mark Willshire |
| Linda Tanner | Sasi Strallen |
| Young Ken Barlow | Tim Driesen |
| Frank Barlow | Steve Elias |
| Martha Longhurst | Ricky Butt |
| Stan Ogden/Jack Duckworth/Drag Queen | Jonathan D Ellis |
| Hilda Ogden | Julia Worsley |
| Rita Fairclough/Ida Barlow | Rachael Wooding |
| Young Bet Lynch | Nina French |
| Vera Duckworth/Annie Walker | Hilary O'Neil |
| Sean Tully | Andrew Derbyshire |
| Becky McDonald (Bridal) | Jenna Lee-James |
| Becky McDonald (Streetwise) | Kayleigh Stephenson |
| David Platt | Chris Piper |
| Drag Queen | Wayne Fitzsimmons |
| Finale Singer (Manchester Only) | Russell Watson |
| Finale Singer (Newcastle Only) | Joe McElderry |
| Finale Singer (Ireland) | Keith Duffy |

== Song list ==
| Song | Sung By |
Act One
| Who Are You? | Ena Sharples & Paul O'Grady |
| Them Barlows | Young Elsie Tanner, Dennis Tanner, Linda Tanner & Paul O'Grady |
| You're Staying In | Frank Barlow, Young Ken Barlow, Ida Barlow & Dancers |
| Rules of the House | Annie Walker & Company |
| A Glass of Spanish Wine | Martha Longhurst & Company |
| Woman Stanley Woman | Hilda Ogden & Stan Ogden |
| He's My Man | Rita Fairclough, Iconic Elsie Tanner & Dancers |
| I Know How It Feels | Young Elsie Tanner & Iconic Elsie Tanner |
| Nowt a Bit of Lippy Couldn't Solve | Bet Lynch |
Act Two
| Cunning Clever Crafty | Vera Duckworth, Bet Lynch, Jack Duckworth & Company |
| I Know How It Feels (Reprise) | Young Elsie Tanner & Iconic Elsie Tanner |
| Your Star Shines So Bright | Curly Watts |
| Norman Bates with a Briefcase | Richard Hillman |
| Sweet Butterfly | Sean Tully |
| If It's Too Late | Bridal Becky McDonald & Streetwise Becky McDonald |
| The Tram Crash | Company |
| Ghost – Take My Hand | Finale Singer Russell Watson, Joe McElderry, Keith Duffy (dependent on Venue) & Company |
| Eh Chuck | Full Company |
