= Jodie Prenger =

British actress (born 1979)

- Born: Jodie Christine Prenger; 12 June 1979 (age 47); Blackpool, Lancashire, England
- Occupations: Actress; singer
- Years active: 1998–present
- Partner(s): Simon Booth (2010–present; eng. 2012)

Jodie Christine Prenger (born 12 June 1979) is an English actress and singer, best known for winning the second series of The Biggest Loser in 2006 and the BBC talent show I'd Do Anything in 2008, the latter of which subsequently launched her career in theatre. In 2022, she began portraying the role of Glenda Shuttleworth in the ITV soap opera Coronation Street.

== Early life ==
Prenger was born on 12 June 1979 to a Dutch father and an English mother of part-Irish descent. She has one brother. Prenger was educated at Elmslie Girls' School in Blackpool, then Blackpool and the Fylde College before starting work in the area as an entertainer. She performed on the cabaret circuit in Northern England and also worked as an agony aunt. In June 1998 she appeared in the Tiptoes Summer Spectacular at Blackpool's Opera House theatre before appearing 20 minutes later in one of the main roles in a Blackpool and the Fylde College production of the musical comedy Hot Mikado at the Grand Theatre.

Prenger's first appearance on television came in 1999 when she appeared on A Taste for Travel on Granada Television with her mother. In 2000, she took part in the Dale Winton show The Other Half on BBC One in which she had to pretend to be the wife of boxer Chris Eubank. Later that year, she played the role of good witch Hurricane, a non-skating role in Halloween Spectacular on Ice at Alton Towers. In 2001, she spent eight months as one of four main entertainers in a team of 19 aboard the cruise ship Disney Wonder. In 2002, she appeared on the very first episode of Ant & Dec's Saturday Night Takeaway.

== Career ==
=== The Biggest Loser ===
Prenger won the second series of The Biggest Loser in 2006, making her the first female in the world to win the show, starting the show a size 22 and weighing 115 kilograms (18.1 st). During the series, she lost more than 51 kilograms (8.0 st). Her final weight was 61 kilograms (9.6 st) and she slimmed down to a size 10 before settling at a size 14/16. Prenger won £25,000 for winning the series.

Later that year, she was also featured on Charlotte Coyle's Fat Beauty Contest on Channel 4, in which Coyle searched for plus-sized models for a beauty pageant.

On 10 March 2009, Prenger appeared on The Paul O'Grady Show and spoke about her time on The Biggest Loser. On seeing a picture of herself after initially losing weight, she said that she believed she had lost too much weight and had become too thin at that time. She also commented that she believed all women should have curves.

=== I'd Do Anything ===
Prenger was the winner of I'd Do Anything on 31 May 2008, giving her the opportunity to play Nancy in a West End revival of the British musical Oliver! at the Theatre Royal, Drury Lane. Prenger attended auditions for the show in Manchester in January 2008, and made it through to the final 42 at "Nancy School" from where she was eventually chosen as one of the twelve finalists to perform in the live shows each week.

After her performance of "Chasing Pavements" in the first live show of the series, Prenger was the joint favourite to win. Panelist John Barrowman said, "I love you to death; you connected with everyone and told the story – that's making a good Nancy!", while Denise Van Outen, another panellist, commented that "Nancy needs to have a lot of life experience and I see that coming through in your performance. It was absolutely brilliant". Barry Humphries, another panellist, who had played Mr Sowerberry, the undertaker, in the original Lionel Bart West End stage production, said, "You've got that toughness and also a tenderness. A beautiful performance and a fine actress." Head judge Andrew Lloyd Webber said that Jodie could "absolutely play this role". In week five, Humphries said that Prenger was "destined for the West End", and in week eight Barrowman labelled Prenger his "perfect Nancy". In the week leading up to the final in week ten, the Nancy finalists posed for publicity pictures recreating some of Madonna's iconic images. On 30 May, Webber revealed that theatrical producer Cameron Mackintosh, who produced the show in the West End, and joined the panel in week nine, was concerned about her curvaceous figure, saying, "Cameron thinks she is a bit too big and has more or less said so". However, Webber defended Prenger, saying that she had both the vocal talents and personality for the role, saying "Jodie could be anybody's idea of Nancy – I can see it absolutely. She has got a lovely voice and a super personality. She has experience as well."

In the final, on 31 May, Prenger performed seven songs, including "As Long as He Needs Me" after she was declared the winner. She also performed "I'd Do Anything" with all the Nancy and Oliver finalists; "Son of a Preacher Man"; "Getting to Know You" from the musical The King and I with Laurence; "Maybe This Time" from the film Cabaret with Jessie Buckley and Samantha Barks as well as also singing "As Long as he Needs Me" and "I Have Nothing" before the final vote. Of her performance of "Son of a Preacher Man", Mackintosh said: "Jodie has convinced me that she could make a Nancy. You absolutely deserve to be in the final." Barrowman said, "every song she sings, you believe the words. I look forward to the day I can guest star with you on the West End stage!" and Webber said, "that was a very, very, very good performance. You have an outsize talent, and a very strong voice. I just don't know if it's going to be quite enough tonight, but it might be." In the second part of the live final, Prenger performed her favourite song from the series, "I Have Nothing", and Nancy's tragic love ballad, "As Long As He Needs Me". After she was announced as the winner, Prenger said, "You have genuinely given me my dream, I can't actually put into words how I feel. I'm so grateful and so chuffed. I'm just Jodie from Blackpool and to be here is my dream." Andrew Lloyd Webber said, "The people's Nancy. Jodie was always going to be the people's choice," adding "I think people love her, they love her open personality. I think they relate to that personality and I think that's what makes her Nancy for the public. Her strengths are her personality and her very, very strong voice." Mackintosh said, "I'm thrilled for Jodie, congratulations!" adding, "She is obviously the public's view of what they want to see as Nancy. She'll give a terrific performance and I really look forward to putting her into training and getting her into rehearsals."

- Please note this is a list of her individual performances only

Show	Song
Week 1	"Chasing Pavements"
Week 2	"I'm Every Woman"
Week 3	"Send in the Clowns" from the musical A Little Night Music
Week 4	"9 to 5"
Week 5	"I Have Nothing"
Week 6	"Luck Be a Lady" from Guys and Dolls
Week 7	"If I Ain't Got You"
Week 8 (quarter-final)	"Holding Out for a Hero"
Week 9 (semi-final)	"Out Here on My Own" from the musical film Fame.
Week 10 (final)	"Son of a Preacher Man" "As Long as He Needs Me" "I Have Nothing"

=== Theatre ===
In June 2008, it was confirmed that Prenger would be performing six of the eight weekly shows of Oliver! after it opened at the Theatre Royal, Drury Lane on 12 December 2008. She performed on Monday and Tuesday evenings, Wednesday matinees, Friday evenings and both the matinee and evening shows each Saturday. Prior to that, she appeared in the ensemble in Les Misérables at the Queen's Theatre from 26 August 2008, in order to gain some experience of performing in the West End. Oliver! opened successfully on 14 January 2009, and Prenger received positive reviews. On 16 March 2009, a new cast recording of the revival was released with Prenger and the rest of the cast. For her role as Nancy, Prenger received the Theatregoers' Choice Whatsonstage Award for Best Supporting Actress in a Musical. She played her final performance as Nancy on 27 March 2010, and was succeeded by fellow West End leading lady Kerry Ellis, who is best known for her role as Elphaba in the hit musical Wicked. Prenger reprised the role of Nancy once more, for two one-off performances on 13 November 2010, whilst Ellis was absent.

After winning I'd Do Anything, Prenger was given a civic reception in her hometown of Blackpool on 7 June 2008, with a specially erected stage in front of the town hall where she performed several songs from Oliver!. On 24 August 2008, she performed in a "Music Under the Stars" event at the annual Faenol Festival held near Y Felinheli in Gwynedd, North Wales.

Prenger played the role of The Lady of the Lake in the UK tour of the hit musical Spamalot, which began performances at New Wimbledon Theatre on 29 May 2010. In 2014, Prenger toured in the UK in the title role of Calamity Jane, starring opposite Tom Lister.

In 2015, Prenger played Miss Hannigan in the UK tour of the musical Annie at Oxford's New Theatre.

Prenger appeared in One Man, Two Guvnors at the Haymarket Theatre in London, alongside Owain Arthur, who took over the role of Francis Henshall from Tony award-winning actor James Corden. Prenger played Elsie Tanner in the ill-fated Street of Dreams, the Coronation Street musical written by Trisha Ward. The show finally premiered in May 2012 after its opening was delayed by more than a month at the Manchester Arena and then was supposed to tour around major UK arenas, but it closed after a couple of nights amid controversy.

Prenger performed in the UK tour of one-woman show Tell Me on a Sunday in 2015 before taking on the title role in the UK tour of Shirley Valentine.

From November until December 2016, Prenger played the role of Madame Thénardier in Les Misérables at the Dubai Opera.

In 2017–2018, Prenger played the lead role of Kelly in the world premiere of Kay Mellor's Fat Friends The Musical alongside Andrew Flintoff, Sam Bailey, Kevin Kennedy, Natalie Anderson, Neil Hurst and Rachel Wooding

In 2019, Prenger toured the UK in Abigail's Party alongside Coronation Street's Vicky Binns. and in 2020 played of Helen in a UK tour of A Taste of Honey before reprising the role at the Trafalgar Studios in London from January until March 2020.

During the COVID-19 lockdowns, Prenger wrote and produced Cinderella: The Socially Distanced Ball with Neil Hurst.

In 2021, Prenger played the part of Beryl in a live-streamed performance of Jonathan Harvey play Hushabye Mountain for the Hope Mill Theatre before reprising the role of Emma for a UK tour of Tell Me on a Sunday in what became one of the first productions to open in the UK as lockdown restrictions eased.

In February 2023, it was announced that Prenger would be reprising the role of Miss Hannigan in a UK tour of Annie at selected venues, alternating with Paul O'Grady and Elaine C. Smith.

Prenger has also starred in pantomimes, beginning with Dick Whittington in 2013 at the Manchester Opera, in which she played the role of Fairy Bow Bells before reprising the role in a new production at the Birmingham Hippodrome in 2016–2017 and then played the Spirit of Sherwood in a production of Robin Hood at the Theatre Royal, Nottingham, across the festive period of 2020–2021.

=== Television and radio ===
In July 2009, Prenger was a guest panellist on ITV's Loose Women.

Prenger occasionally presented the midweek National Lottery draw on BBC One.

In April 2011, she played Diane in Candy Cabs, a drama series about a group of friends who set up a female-only taxi company in a seaside town in Northern England.

In June 2011, Prenger appeared in an episode of Waterloo Road, playing PR woman Linda Wickes.

In 2013, Prenger participated in Let's Dance for Comic Relief. Boyzone's Keith Duffy had originally planned to participate in the programme, but was unable to compete due to private matters. Prenger then took his place on the show. Her first appearance was in the third heat on 2 March 2013, in which she danced to the song "Word Up!" by Cameo. She was saved by the public, and as a result, made it through to the final on 9 March 2013, in which she finished second place to Antony Cotton.

She has been a regular contributor on The Alan Titchmarsh Show and This Morning.

Prenger also frequently sits in for Elaine Paige when she is absent from her BBC Radio 2 show. She performed the same function for Paul O'Grady during his time on the station.

On 4 December 2011, Prenger appeared on the CBeebies show Justin's House.

Prenger hosted the weekly "Mishaps Podcast" with Emmerdale actress Natalie Anderson and Neil Hurst over the course of two series from 2018 until 2019.

In 2022, Prenger joined the regular cast of ITV1 soap opera Coronation Street as cruise ship singer Glenda Shuttleworth, the sister of established character George Shuttleworth (Tony Maudsley). On Christmas Eve, she participated alongside some her castmates in ITV charity special Britain Get Singing, in which they performed "This Is Me" from The Greatest Showman in aid of mental health charity Britain Get Talking.

=== Other work ===
On 25 May 2002, Prenger was a "contestant" on a live but unaired run-through pilot of Ant & Dec's Saturday Night Takeaway, a live game show with a studio audience, that premiered two weeks later on ITV.

On 23 February 2009, Prenger released her autobiography, It's a Fine Life.

On 1 January 2014, Prenger released her workout DVD Jodie Prenger's Fitness Blasts through QVC.

== Personal life ==
Prenger was engaged to her boyfriend, Steve Greengrass, who proposed to her after the Saturday show in week three of I'd Do Anything on 12 April 2008 – a whirlwind romance which was featured throughout the series as their first date some three months earlier had been Prenger's audition in Manchester.

In April 2012, Prenger announced her engagement to boyfriend of two years, Simon Booth, soon after her father, Marty, died of kidney cancer.

== Theatre credits ==
Year	Production	Role	Venue
2008	Les Misérables	Ensemble	Queen's Theatre
2009–2010	Oliver!	Nancy	Theatre Royal, Drury Lane
2010	Spamalot	The Lady of the Lake	UK Tour
2012	One Man, Two Guvnors	Dolly	Theatre Royal, Haymarket
2013–2014	Dick Whittington	Fairy Bowbells	Manchester Opera House
2014	Calamity Jane	Calamity Jane	UK Tour
2015–2016	Tell Me on a Sunday	Emma	UK Tour
2016	Annie	Miss Hannigan	UK Tour
2016	Les Misérables	Madame Thénardier	Dubai Opera House
2016–2017	Dick Whittington	Fairy Bowbells	Birmingham Hippodrome
2017	Shirley Valentine	Shirley Valentine	UK Tour
2018	Fat Friends the Musical	Kelly	UK Tour
2019	Abigail's Party	Beverly	UK Tour
2019	Annie	Miss Hannigan	UK Tour
2019–2020	A Taste of Honey	Helen	UK Tour; Trafalgar Studios
2021	Hushabye Mountain	Beryl	Livestream Hope Mill Theatre
2021	Tell Me on a Sunday	Emma	UK Tour
2021–2022	Robin Hood	The Spirit of Sherwood	Nottingham Theatre Royal
2023	Annie	Miss Hannigan	UK Tour

== Filmography ==
Television

- The Biggest Loser (2006) – Participant, winner
- I'd Do Anything (2008) – Participant, winner
- Loose Women (2009) – Guest panellist
- The National Lottery Draws (2009–2011) – Presenter
- Candy Cabs (2011) – Diane
- Born to Shine (2011) – Participant
- Sing If You Can (2011) – Participant
- Waterloo Road (2011) – Linda Wickes
- Hustle (2012) – Carol
- Let's Dance for Comic Relief (2013) – Participant
- Wizards vs Aliens (2013) – Mrs. Meeks
- Casualty (2015) – Sorcha Greene
- Jamie Johnson (2017) – Joanne Simmonds
- Years and Years (2019) – Debbie Green
- Shakespeare & Hathaway: Private Investigators (2022) – Val Twigg
- Coronation Street (2022–present) – Glenda Shuttleworth
- The Walk-In (2022) – DC Buckley

Guest appearances as self

- Celebrity Bargain Hunt
- New Year Live (2008)
- As Seen on TV (2009)
- All Star Family Fortunes (2009)
- The Michael Ball Show (2010)
- The David Dickinson Show (2010)
- BBC's School Choir of the Year (2010)
- Daily Cooks Challenge (2010)
- Let's Do Lunch with Gino & Mel (2011, 2014)
- Justin's House (2011)
- The Chase: Celebrity Special (2012)
- Let's Do Christmas with Gino & Mel (2012)
- Britain's Brightest (2013)
- Pointless Celebrities (2013)
- Sport Relief's Top Dog (2014)
- Weekend (2014)
- Who's Doing the Dishes? (2016)
- Richard Osman's House of Games (2024)

== Biography ==
- It's A Fine Life (2009)

== Discography ==
- Oliver! London Cast Recording (2009)
- The Very Best of Glenn Miller (2010)
- Spamalot: UK Tour Cast Recording (2011)
