= Thomas Coyle =

Thomas Coyle may refer to:

- Thomas Coyle (rugby league) (born 1988), English rugby league
- Tommy Coyle (footballer) (born 1959), footballer
- Thomas Coyle (runner) (born 1995), American middle-distance runner, 2016 All-American for the Stanford Cardinal track and field team
- Thomas Coyle, accused and acquitted of the Murder of George Campbell

== See also ==
- Tommy Coyle (disambiguation)
