= Coile =

Coile is a surname. Notable people with the surname include:

- Albert Van Coile (1900–1927), Belgian footballer
- Brantley Coile, American inventor

== See also ==
- Coyle
