= CBS Sports Network =

Sports-oriented pay television network

- Country: United States
- Broadcast area: Nationwide
- Headquarters: New York City

Programming
- Language: English
- Picture format: 1080i HDTV (downgraded to letterboxed 480i for the SDTV feed)

Ownership
- Owner: Skydance Corporation
- Parent: CBS Sports
- Key people: David Berson (President and CEO, CBS Sports)
- Sister channels: see list of assets owned by Skydance Corporation

History
- Launched: June 1, 2002; 24 years ago
- Former names: National College Sports Network (2002–2003); College Sports Television (2003–2008); CBS College Sports Network (2008–2011)

Links
- Website: CBSSportsNetwork.com

Availability

Streaming media
- Affiliated Streaming Service: Paramount+
- Service(s): DirecTV Stream, FuboTV, Hulu + Live TV, YouTube TV

CBS Sports Network is an American digital cable and satellite television network owned by the CBS Entertainment Group unit of Skydance Corporation. When it launched in 2002 as the National College Sports Network (later College Sports Television also known as CSTV), it operated as a multi-platform media brand which also included its primary website, collegesports.com, and a network of websites operated for the athletic departments of 215 colleges and universities.

After CSTV was acquired by CBS in 2006 (handed over from Viacom who purchased the network the previous year), the network was re-branded as the CBS College Sports Network in 2008. The network initially maintained its college sports focus, but in February 2011, the service was re-branded as CBS Sports Network to re-position it as a mainstream sports service. The network continues to have a particular focus on college sports, along with coverage of UEFA club tournaments (including the UEFA Champions League), smaller leagues and events, simulcasts of sports radio shows from both the Infinity Sports Network network and Audacy's WFAN (formerly owned outright by CBS) and studio and analysis programming.

As of May 2015, CBS Sports Network was available to approximately 61 million pay television households (66.1% of households with cable television) in the United States. Updated figures are unknown as they have not been released by Paramount in nearly a decade.

== History ==
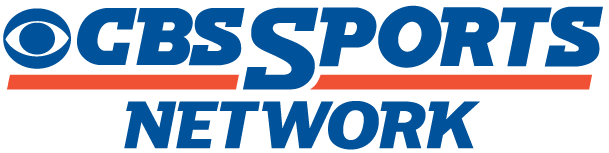
Logo used from 2011 to 2016

The network's roots began in 1999 when Chris Bevilacqua approached the co-founders of the Classic Sports Network, Brian Bedol and Stephen Greenberg—at that time, running Fusient Media Ventures, a New York-based sports and media company—with the idea for a subscription network featuring college sports 24 hours a day. Under the leadership of Bedol as CEO, the network was originally named the National College Sports Network in June 2002, was subsequently renamed College Sports Television (CSTV) and launched on February 23, 2003. The first event aired on the network was a Connecticut-Notre Dame women's basketball game. From their headquarters and studio operations at Chelsea Piers in New York City, CSTV was the first independent pay-television channel to be distributed nationwide, having been carried on satellite provider DirecTV at launch.

In 2004, CSTV bought sports television syndication network SportsWest for a $25 million investment from former NBA owner Dave Checketts and George Soros.

In November 2005, College Sports Television was purchased by Viacom for $325 million. CBS Corporation (Viacom's legal successor) took control of the network in January 2006. On January 3, 2008, it was announced that CSTV would be integrated into CBS Sports, with the sports division's executive vice president and executive producer, Tony Petitti, taking over day-to-day operational management of CSTV, which would be overseen by CBS News and Sports president Sean McManus. CSTV co-founder Brian Bedol would become a senior advisor to CBS Corporation president and CEO Leslie Moonves. (Petitti has since become the Big Ten commissioner.)

In the fall of 2006, CSTV launched more than 100 broadband channels dedicated to college sports, which feature more than 10,000 live events. The subscription/pay-per-view service, called CBS College Sports XXL, and its portfolio of broadband channels in its All-Access suite, include coverage of Notre Dame, Southern California, Kansas, Ohio State and North Carolina.

=== CBS reorganization ===
On February 12, 2008, CBS Corporation announced that, as part of the ongoing integration of CSTV into CBS Sports, that the network would be renamed the CBS College Sports Network on March 16, coinciding with the start of CBS's coverage of the NCAA's basketball tournament. Studio shows moved from the original Chelsea Piers headquarters to the CBS Broadcast Center on West 57th Street in 2012. As part of the relaunch, the network added a new news program, College Sports Tonight. That program was canceled in 2010; however, other studio shows (including Inside College Football and Inside College Basketball) still originate from the Chelsea Piers location.

On February 15, 2011, CBS announced that the network would be relaunched as CBS Sports Network on April 4 (coinciding with the end of the 2011 NCAA basketball tournament), to reflect an expansion into non-collegiate sports programming.

== High definition ==
A high-definition simulcast feed of the channel, broadcasting at 1080i, was launched in August 2008. Prior to the launch of the feed, the two NCAA basketball tournament games that aired in March 2008, which were presented in HD on CBS, were converted to a standard-definition feed. CBS Sports Network uses the AFD #10 broadcast flag to present programming on its standard definition feed in letterboxed widescreen for viewers watching through 4:3 television sets.

== Programming ==
CBS Sports Network televises original programming, features, talk shows and documentaries as well as extensive women's sports coverage. Its regular season and championship event coverage draws from every major collegiate athletic conference and division, in addition to nine NCAA championships. CBS Sports Network televises 35 men's and women's college sports including football, basketball, baseball, ultimate, hockey, lacrosse, soccer, wrestling and volleyball from every major conference. The network holds multi-media and marketing rights for the Mountain West Conference, the Atlantic 10 Conference, Conference USA, the Patriot League, Army football and Navy football.

In April 2006, the network organized the first Collegiate Nationals, a festival of championships dedicated to crowning champions in a wide variety of collegiate action sports such as snowboarding, wakeboarding and beach volleyball. More than 1,000 competitors converged on Reno-Tahoe to compete, the largest number ever for an event of its kind. For its second installment in 2007, the Collegiate Nationals added sports and other events such as national film and music competitions, as well as a second venue—San Diego. The third year, 2008, brought further changes, as the winter sports events were moved to the Keystone Resort near Boulder, Colorado and competitive eating was added.

In the fall of 2006, CSTV and Comcast launched the MountainWest Sports Network (colloquially known as The Mtn.), a network focusing exclusively on the Mountain West Conference. The relation with the network also gave CSTV exclusive online and broadcasting rights to Notre Dame's game at Air Force on November 11, 2006—which caused controversy since CSTV did not have carriage as widely distributed as other networks that have aired Notre Dame games. The Irish did not revisit a Mountain West team until a 2013 game at Air Force, which once again aired on CBS Sports Network.

=== 2010s ===
On April 3, 2012, CBS Sports Network premiered Rome, a sports news and talk program hosted by nationally syndicated radio host Jim Rome; Rome had recently left ESPN and his previous show, Jim Rome Is Burning, after signing a new contract with CBS Sports. Rome ended in March 2015, but the channel subsequently announced in October 2017 that it will add a television simulcast of his radio program, The Jim Rome Show, beginning January 2, 2018.

On June 7, 2012, CBS Sports Network began to air the remaining games of the American Hockey League's 2012 Calder Cup Final between the Norfolk Admirals and the Toronto Marlies, starting with game 3. On July 26, 2012, the network signed a deal with the United Football League—a second-tier professional football league that began play in October 2009—to televise its games for the 2012 season. The UFL paid for all production expenses and received no rights fee from CBS Sports Network for the broadcasts. The league lasted approximately four weeks on CBS Sports Network before suspending operations halfway through the season.

Beginning in the 2012–13 season, CBS Sports Network began airing selected events for the Professional Bowlers Association's PBA Tour.

In September 2012, CBS Sports Network introduced the new NFL studio show NFL Monday QB. The following season, CBS Sports Network premiered That Other Pre-Game Show, a weekly, four-hour studio show on Sunday mornings hosted by Adam Schein, Jonathan Jones, Kyle Long, Amy Trask, and Brock Vereen, designed to be a more "casual" and "fan-focused" counterpart to CBS's own The NFL Today and competitors (such as ESPN's Sunday NFL Countdown).

On April 26, 2013, the network announced that it had signed a deal with the GEICO Motorcycle AMA Pro Road Racing Series for the remainder of the 2013 and the 2014 seasons. The network aired flag to flag coverage for the races as well as live coverage for several of the races. The network broadcast the FIA WTCC Race of the United States from Sonoma Raceway on September 8, 2013.

On December 2, 2013, CBS Sports Network announced that it was to begin simulcasting the Boomer and Carton (now Boomer and Gio) morning show from then co-owned sports talk radio station WFAN in New York City in January 2014.

In October 2014, CBS Sports Network launched a new talk show, We Need To Talk, which became the first, and only, nationally televised all-female sports panel show. Regular panellists include former professional boxer Laila Ali, former professional basketball player Lisa Leslie and USTA President Katrina Adams.

In August 2015, the network premiered Time to Schein, a new program hosted by Adam Schein.

Logo from 2016 to 2021

In July 2017, the network announced a new documentary series, Four Sides of the Story, to examine notable moments in sports from four perspectives each; the series premiere focused on the Villanova Wildcats' buzzer beater at the 2016 NCAA Division I men's basketball championship game.

CBS Sports Network was one of three cable broadcasters of the Alliance of American Football—a second-tier developmental football league, alongside NFL Network and TNT. A weekly game and one playoff game were assigned to CBS Sports Network. As was the case with the UFL, the AAF paid CBS Sports Network for the airtime; the AAF abruptly ceased operations before the season ended.

On April 4, 2019, the 3-on-3 basketball league Big3 announced that it would move to CBS and CBS Sports Network for its 2019 season. CBS Sports Network will air at least 25 hours of coverage, including coverage of the league's draft.

On April 22, 2019, CBS Sports reached an agreement to televise select games from the WNBA; coverage is now split between CBS and ESPN/ABC (who up to that point had held exclusive rights since 2003). CBS is also the last of the Big Three television networks to cover the WNBA (NBC had the first-ever broadcast rights, which ran from 1997 to 2002).

In November 2019, it was reported that CBS Sports had acquired the U.S. English-language broadcast rights to the UEFA Champions League beginning in the 2021–22 season, with CBS Sports Network expected to be incorporated into the coverage. CBS would end up starting its coverage a year earlier in 2020 after acquiring the rights to the remainder of the 2019–20 and 2020–21 seasons after Turner Sports opted out of its remaining contract.

=== 2020s ===
On January 9, 2020, the Mountain West Conference announced that it had reached a new six-year deal with CBS and Fox Sports for its top-tier basketball and football rights. CBS Sports Network will remain the conference's primary broadcaster with 23 football games and 23 men's basketball games per-season, and there will be an option for selected games and the conference men's basketball championship to air on CBS, and events in Olympic sports to air on CBS Sports Network beginning in 2021. The Mountain West football championship and Boise State home games will move to a Fox network.

CBS Sports Network acquired a package of World of Outlaws events from June 20 to July 4.

On September 11, 2020, Bellator MMA announced that its events would move to CBS Sports Network moving forward, after having previously aired on Paramount Network, which is in the process of abandoning non-scripted development in favor of films. Bellator and Paramount Network were under Viacom when the company merged with CBS Corporation to form ViacomCBS. However, only five months later, the promotion announced that it would instead move to CBS's sister premium network Showtime.

On April 19, 2021, the World Series of Poker and CBS Sports announced a multi-year rights agreement with PokerGO to become the domestic television partner for the WSOP Main Event and various WSOP bracelet events, ending its long-term relationship with ESPN.

Beginning in January 2023, CBS Sports HQ has produced a three hour sports information show for CBS Sports Network entitled CBS Sports HQ Spotlight.

On April 27, 2023, the channel announced a new multi-year broadcasting rights deal with the Canadian Football League, becoming the new U.S. TV rightsholder to the league; the channel will broadcast 34 CFL games for the 2023 season.

On May 29, 2025, the PBA announced a two-year deal with CBS and CW Sports, which would see CBS Sports Network carry four "animal pattern" tournaments in the PBA World Series of Bowling, and the reformatted PBA Commissioner's Cup.

== Sports broadcast rights ==
=== Professional sports ===
- UEFA Champions League (2020–present)
  - Group and knockout stages only
    - UEFA Champions League final (2020)
- UEFA Europa League (2020–present)
  - All group and knockout stages
  - UEFA Europa League final
- UEFA Super Cup (2020–present)
- UEFA Conference League (starting in 2021–22 season)
- Scottish Professional Football League (2021–2025)
  - Scottish Premiership
  - Scottish Championship
  - Scottish League Cup
- Big3 basketball (2019)
  - Encore presentations (2021–present)
- NWSL (2020–present)
- Professional Bull Riders (2012–2024)
  - Weekly coverage
- PRCA ProRodeo (2014–2019)
- Major League Rugby (2018–2022)
- PGA Tour on CBS (2012–present)
  - Masters on the Range (2013–present)
  - PGA Championship on the Range (2012–present)
- World's Strongest Man (2013–present)
  - Full coverage of competitions, beginning in 2013
  - Reruns of past World's Strongest Man competitions
- Tennis on CBS
  - World TeamTennis (2019–2020)
  - Davis Cup (2020–present)
- Bellator MMA (2020–2021)
- 3ICE Hockey (2022–present)
- Athletes Unlimited Softball (2020–present)
- World Series of Poker (2021–present)
- Canadian Football League (via TSN, 2023–present)
- Arena Football League (2013–2018, 2024 playoffs)
- Indoor Football League (2023–2025, championship only)
- USL Championship (2024–present)
- Serie A (2021–present)
- English Football League (2024–present)

=== Motorsports ===
- Lucas Oil Off Road Racing Series (2010–2020)
- World Racing Group (2013–present)
  - World of Outlaws NOS Energy Sprint Cars (2013–present, select races such as World Finals and Kings Royal)
  - World of Outlaws Morton Buildings Late Models (2013–present, select races such as World Finals and Prairie Dirt Classic)
  - Super DIRTcar Series Big Block Modifieds (2013–2015, select races such as Super DIRT Week and World Finals)
- Stadium Super Trucks (2014–present)
- AMSOIL Championship Snowcross (2013–present)
- Trans-Am Series (2015–present)
- SCCA National Championship Runoffs (2017–present)
- eShort Course World Cup (2021–present)
- Championship Off-Road (2022–present)
- Kicker AMA Arenacross Series (2022–present)
- Best in the Desert (2022–2024, select races)

== Carriage ==
CBS Sports Network is available nationally on most subscription television providers in the United States.

In Canada, Rogers Cable began carrying CBS Sports Network on October 9, 2008. Satellite provider Bell Satellite TV started carrying the channel on September 3, 2009, and stopped on August 21, 2014 (they subsequently brought the channel back August 2015). Certain programs aired by the network (particularly NFL and NCAA basketball tournament related programs and other programs whose rights are owned by other broadcasters) are blacked out in Canada, and replaced with reruns of other events or studio programs. On December 31, 2024, Paramount Global withdrew BET and CBS Sports Network from Canadian distribution.

In late February 2009, CBS Sports Network reached a new carriage agreement with DirecTV, which allowed the satellite provider to move the channel from its add on "Sports Pack" to its "Choice Xtra" base package; the move became effective on February 25, 2009, expanding the channel's distribution to 30 million subscribers.

On July 7, 2009, Cox Communications announced that it would add the channel to its systems in Orange County, California and Arizona on August 1, 2009. AT&T U-verse added the network on February 17, 2010. On August 1, 2011, Cable One added the network in select markets.

On July 20, 2019, DirecTV and AT&T U-verse removed it from their lineup due to a carriage dispute with CBS Corporation. The channel was re-added on August 8, 2019, to both platforms as they reached a multi-year content carriage agreement.

== On-air staff ==
=== Announcers, reporters and hosts ===
- Adam Zucker – host and play-by-play (2003–present)
- Brent Stover – host and play-by-play (2003–present)
- Grant Boone – reporter (2011–present)
- Dave Ryan – play-by-play (2006–present)
- Jason Knapp – play-by-play (2008–present)
- Tom McCarthy – host and play-by-play (2012–present)
- Matt Shepard – play-by-play (2008–present)
- Krista Blunk – reporter (2008–present)
- Ben Holden – play-by-play (2008–2020)
- Jim Rome – host and play-by-play (2012–present)
- John Sadak – play-by-play (2012–present)
- Carter Blackburn – play-by-play (2014–present)
- Andrew Catalon – play-by-play (2009–present)
- Brad Johansen – play-by-play (2012–present)
- Adam Schein – host and play-by-play (2012–present)
- Dave Popkin – play-by-play (2016–present)
- Dave Armstrong – play-by-play (2016–present)
- Mike Crispino – play-by-play (2017–present)
- Rich Waltz – play-by-play (2010–present)
- Dylan Jacobs – play-by-play (2018–present)
- Tina Cervasio – reporter (2018–present)
- Ed Cohen – play-by-play (2017–present)
- Jason Horowitz – play-by-play (2018–present)
- Alex Del Barrio – play-by-play (2020–present)
- Joel Godett – play-by-play (2018–present)
- Michael Grady – play-by-play (present)
- Andy Greathouse – director (2003–present)
- Lisa Byington – reporter and play-by-play (2020–present)
- Chris Lewis – play-by-play (2021–present)
- Chris Sylvester – play-by-play (2022–present)
- Chick Hernandez – play-by-play (2022–present)
- John Fanta – play-by-play (2022–present)
- Brett Dolan – play-by-play (2022–present)
- Paul Burmeister – play-by-play (2023–present)
- Jordan Kent – play-by-play (2023–present)
- Pete Yanity – play-by-play (2023–present)
- AJ Ross – reporter (2023–present)
- Matt Schick – play-by-play (2023–present)
- Chris Hassel – play-by-play (2023–present)
- Danny Waugh – play-by-play (2023–present)
- Sloane Martin – play-by-play (2023–present)
- Dave Neal – play-by-play (2023–present)
- Meghan McPeak – play-by-play (2023–present)
- Craig D'Amico – play-by-play (2023–present)
- Paul Dottino – play-by-play (2023–present)
- Fran Charles – play-by-play (2024–present)
- Dave Friedman – play-by-play (2024–present)
- Pat McCarthy – play-by-play (2025–present)
- Alex Heinert – play-by-play (2026–present)

=== Football ===
- Corey Chavous – analyst (2012–present)
- Randy Cross – analyst (2008–present)
- Aaron Murray – analyst (2018–present)
- Houston Nutt – analyst (2011–present)
- Brian Jones – analyst (2003–present)
- Aaron Taylor – analyst (2009–present)

=== Basketball ===
- Alaa Abdelnaby – analyst (2012–present)
- Kim Adams – analyst (2022–present)
- Dan Bonner – analyst (2003–present)
- Doris Burke – analyst (2023–present)
- Tykera Carter – analyst (2023–present)
- Tim Capstraw – analyst (2023–present)
- Mo Cassara – analyst (2018–present)
- Jordan Cornette – analyst (2016–present)
- Kelly Crull – analyst (2023–present)
- Tre Demps – analyst (2024–present)
- Joe DeSantis – analyst (2023–present)
- Seth Davis – analyst (2003–present)
- Dan Dickau – analyst (2018–present)
- Tim Doyle – analyst (2015–present)
- Khalid El-Amin – analyst (2018–present)
- John Giannini – analyst (2022–present)
- Pete Gillen – analyst (2008–present)
- Doug Gottlieb – analyst (2012–present)
- Danny Granger – analyst (2017–present)
- Avery Johnson – analyst (2023–present)
- Steve Lappas – analyst (2008–present)
- Kyle Macy – analyst (2016–present)
- Donny Marshall – analyst (2020–present)
- King McClure – analyst (2023–present)
- Monika Moore – analyst (2023–present)
- Julia Morales – analyst (2023–present)
- Mike O'Donnell – analyst (2022–present)
- Gary Parrish – analyst (2018–present)
- Chris Piper – analyst (2015–present)
- Jon Rothstein – analyst (2003–present)
- Leah Secondo – analyst (2023–present)
- Wally Szczerbiak – analyst (2003–present)
- BJ Taylor – analyst (2023–present)
- Tarik Turner – analyst (2023–present)
- Julianne Viani-Braen – analyst (2017–present)
- Chris Walker – analyst (2022–present)
- Bob Wenzel – analyst (2017–present)
- Steve Wolf – analyst (2018–present)
- Jay Wright – analyst (2022–present)
- Isis Young – analyst (2023–present)
- John Henson – analyst (2025–present)
- Shon Morris – analyst (2026–present)
