= The Biggest Loser (British TV series) series 3 =

The Biggest Loser
- Season 3
- Starring: Kate Garraway (host); Angie Dowds (trainer); Richard Callender (trainer)
- No. of episodes: 40

Release
- Original network: ITV, STV, UTV
- Original release: 27 April – 19 June 2009

Series chronology
- ← Previous; Series 2 Next → Series 4

The Biggest Loser UK 2009 was the third season of the reality television series The Biggest Loser. The season first aired on 27 April 2009 with the final episode on 19 June 2009 with eight overweight couples (sixteen individuals) competing for a cash prize of £10,000. Kate Garraway was featured as the host, with trainers Angie Dowds and Richard Callender. Kevin Sage was named as the winner after losing 9 st 6 lb.

== Contestants ==
Contestant	Couples Team	Blue vs. Black	Status	Total Votes
Raz May, 45, Plymouth	Red Team		Eliminated Week 1	3
Lisa Marie May, Returned Week 6	Red Team		Eliminated Week 1	3
Rick Shepherd, 43, York	Light Blue Team		Eliminated Week 2	3
Michelle Shepherd, 30, York	Light Blue Team		Eliminated Week 2	3
Eunice Gardner, 34, Banbury	Orange Team		Illness, Left Week 3	0
Jennifer Clarke, 45, Nottingham	Yellow Team		Eliminated Week 3	2
Miriam Harrison, 31, Bristol	Orange Team		Eliminated Week 4	3
Dave Dickinson, 48, Luton	Grey Team	Black Team	Eliminated Week 5	2
Marco Mark Lewis, 40, Hull	Brown Team	Blue Team	Eliminated Week 6	4
Lisa Marie May, 22, Plymouth	Red Team	Blue Team	Eliminated Week 7	0
Michaela Cohen, 38, Essex	Pink Team	Blue Team	Eliminated Week 7	2
Katey Brown, 21, Liverpool	Green Team	Blue Team	Eliminated Week 8	2
Jamie Dickinson, 22, Luton	Grey Team	Blue Team	Eliminated Week 8	2
Maria Browes, 44, Essex	Pink Team	Black Team	3rd Runner-Up	0
Sadie Clarke-Taylor,21, Nottingham	Yellow Team	Black Team	2nd Runner-Up	0
Carol Brown, 46, Liverpool	Green Team	Black Team	Runner-Up	0
Kevin Sage, 34, South London	Brown Team	Black Team	Winner	0

Total Votes counts only votes that are revealed at elimination. The total doesn't count unrevealed votes.

== Weigh-ins ==
Contestants are listed in chronological order of elimination.

Contestant	Age	Starting weight	Week								Finale	Weight lost	Percentage lost
Contestant	Age	Starting weight	1	2	3	4	5	6	7	8	Finale	Weight lost	Percentage lost
Kevin	34	23 st 8 lb	22 st 5 lb	21 st 8 lb	20 st 13 lb	20 st 8 lb	20 st 3 lb	19 st 9 lb	19 st 4 lb	18 st 7 lb	14 st 2 lb	9 st 6 lb	40.00%
Carol	46	15 st 11 lb	15 st 4 lb	14 st 12 lb	14 st 10 lb	14 st 6 lb	14 st 5 lb	13 st 12 lb	13 st 6 lb	13 st 4 lb	10 st 12 lb	4 st 13 lb	31.22%
Sadie	21	21 st 5 lb	20 st 8 lb	20 st 4 lb	20 st 3 lb	20 st 0 lb	19 st 9 lb	19 st 0 lb	18 st 11 lb	18 st 2 lb	15 st 5 lb	6 st 0 lb	28.09%
Maria	44	15 st 11 lb	15 st 7 lb	15 st 1 lb	14 st 11 lb	14 st 8 lb	14 st 3 lb	13 st 12 lb	13 st 9 lb	13 st 4 lb	11 st 12 lb	3 st 13 lb	24.89%
Katey	21	22 st 3 lb	21 st 8 lb	21 st 3 lb	20 st 13 lb	20 st 9 lb	20 st 6 lb	20 st 0 lb	19 st 6 lb	19 st 4 lb	17 st 9 lb	4 st 8 lb	20.58%
Jamie	22	28 st 8 lb	28 st 1 lb	27 st 7 lb	27 st 0 lb	26 st 2 lb	25 st 12 lb	25 st 3 lb	24 st 12 lb	24 st 9 lb	22 st 9 lb	5 st 13 lb	20.75%
Michaela	38	15 st 9 lb	15 st 4 lb	15 st 0 lb	14 st 9 lb	14 st 4 lb	14 st 1 lb	13 st 10 lb	13 st 6 lb		12 st 7 lb	3 st 2 lb	20.09%
Lisa	22	25 st 10 lb	25 st 4 lb					23 st 11 lb	23 st 7 lb		21 st 8 lb	4 st 2 lb	16.11%
Mark	40	25 st 13 lb	25 st 1 lb	24 st 2 lb	23 st 1 lb	22 lb 9 lb	22 st 1 lb	21 st 7 lb			18 st 13 lb	7 st 0 lb	27.00%
Dave	48	23 st 3 lb	23 st 1 lb	22 st 5 lb	21 st 13 lb	21 st 7 lb	21 st 5 lb				18 st 4 lb	4 st 13 lb	21.23%
Miriam	31	15 st 2 lb	15 st 0 lb	14 st 8 lb	14 st 4 lb	14 st 4 lb					11 st 6 lb	3 st 10 lb	24.53%
Jennifer	45	23 st 5 lb	23 st 0 lb	22 st 13 lb	22 st 11 lb						20 st 13 lb	2 st 6 lb	10.40%
Eunice	34	23 st 8 lb	23 st 0 lb	22 st 6 lb							20 st 1 lb	3 st 7 lb	14.85%
Michelle	30	16 st 3 lb	15 st 1 lb	15 st 9 lb							13 st 11 lb	2 st 6 lb	14.98%
Rick	43	21 st 5 lb	20 st 12 lb	20 st 4 lb							19 st 4 lb	2 st 1 lb	9.70%
Raz	45	15 st 1 lb	14 st 11 lb								12 st 11 lb	2 st 4 lb	15.17%

Winners
£10,000 Winner (among the finalists)
Standings
Week's Biggest Loser
Week's Biggest Loser & Immunity
Immunity (Challenge or Weigh-In)
Highest Percentage Weight Loss (Non-finalist)

=== Weigh-Ins Figures History ===
Contestant	Week								Finale
Contestant	1	2	3	4	5	6	7	8	Finale
Kevin	1 st 3 lb	11 lb	9 lb	5 lb	5 lb	8 lb	5 lb	11 lb	4 st 5 lb
Carol	7 lb	6 lb	2 lb	4 lb	1 lb	7 lb	6 lb	2 lb	2 st 6 lb
Sadie	11 lb	4 lb	1 lb	3 lb	5 lb	9 lb	3 lb	9 lb	2 st 11 lb
Maria	4 lb	6 lb	4 lb	3 lb	5 lb	5 lb	3 lb	5 lb	1 st 6 lb
Katey	9 lb	5 lb	4 lb	4 lb	3 lb	6 lb	8 lb	2 lb	1 st 9 lb
Jamie	7 lb	8 lb	7 lb	12 lb	4 lb	9 lb	5 lb	3 lb	2 st
Michaela	5 lb	4 lb	5 lb	5 lb	3 lb	5 lb	4 lb		13 lb
Lisa Marie	6 lb					1 st 7 lb	4 lb		1 st 13 lb
Mark	12 lb	13 lb	1 st 1 lb	6 lb	8 lb	8 lb			2 st 8 lb
Dave	2 lb	10 lb	6 lb	6 lb	2 lb				3 st 1 lb
Miriam	2 lb	6 lb	4 lb	0 lb					2 st 12 lb
Jennifer	5 lb	1 lb	2 lb						1 st 12 lb
Eunice	8 lb	8 lb							2 st 5 lb
Michelle	1 st 2 lb	+8 lb							1 st 12 lb
Rick	7 lb	8 lb							1 st
Raz	4 lb								2 st

== Elimination voting history ==
Name	Week							
Name	1	2	3	4	5	6	7	8
Eliminated	Raz & Lisa Marie	Michelle & Rick	Eunice, Jennifer	Miriam	Dave	Mark	Lisa Marie, Michaela	Katey, Jamie
Kevin	Grey Team	Blue Team	Yellow Team	Yellow Team	Dave	X	X	Sadie
Carol	Grey Team	Blue Team	X	Orange Team	Sadie	X	X	Katey
Sadie	Red Team	X	X	X	Carol	X	X	Jamie
Maria	Grey Team	Blue Team	Green Team	Orange Team	Dave	X	X	Sadie
Katey	Grey Team	Blue Team	X	Orange Team	X	Mark	Michaela	Jamie
Jamie	X	Yellow Team	Yellow Team	Orange Team	X	Mark	Michaela	Katey
Michaela	Grey Team	Blue Team	Green Team	Orange Team	X	Mark	Jamie	
Lisa Marie	X					Mark		
Mark	Grey Team	Blue Team	Yellow Team	Yellow Team	X	Michaela		
Dave	X	Yellow Team	Yellow Team	Orange Team	Carol			
Miriam	Red Team	?	Green Team	X				
Jennifer	Red Team	X	X					
Eunice	Red Team	?	X					
Michelle	Red Team	X						
Rick	Red Team	X						
Raz	X							

- Won immunity (Challenge or Weigh-in).
- X Below yellow line, not allowed to vote.
- X Not in elimination, not allowed to vote.
- ? Vote not revealed because a majority had already been reached.
- X Withdrew before vote took place.
- Eliminated or not in house.
- Eliminated due to lowest percentage weight loss

Notes
The votes in week 8 where a vote for the last place in the final 4. As there was a tie, Kevin had the deciding vote and he chose to take Sadie to the 4th finalist.
