= The Biggest Loser (British TV series) =

British reality television show

- Created by: Dave Broome
- Presented by: Vicki Butler-Henderson (2005–2006); Kate Garraway (2009); Davina McCall (2011–2012)
- Starring: Mark Bailey (2005–2006); Angie Dowds (2005–2011); Richard Callender (2009–2012); Charlotte Ord (2012); Rob Edmond (2012)
- Country of origin: United Kingdom
- Original language: English
- No. of series: 5
- No. of episodes: 80

Production
- Production locations: Stanford Hall (2005–2012); The London Studios (2011); The Maidstone Studios (2012)
- Running time: 60–90 minutes (inc. adverts)
- Production company: Shine TV

Original release
- Network: LivingTV
- Release: 6 October 2005 – 27 December 2006
- Network: ITV
- Release: 27 April 2009 – 13 March 2012

Related
- The Biggest Loser

The Biggest Loser is a British reality television show that began airing on Sky Living from 2005 to 2006, before moving to ITV in 2009 and finished in 2012. Most recently hosted by Davina McCall, the show is a spin-off of the American reality television show of the same name.

The show originally featured Angie Dowds and Mark Bailey as the personal trainers, with Richard Callender replacing Bailey from series 3. After Dowds died in 2011, she was replaced by Charlotte Ord and Rob "The Killer" Edmond for the fifth series.

The first two series of the show were hosted by Vicki Butler-Henderson on Living TV. The show then moved to ITV, where the third series was hosted by Kate Garraway, and the fourth and fifth by Davina McCall.

In September 2012, it was announced that the show would be cancelled, with no further series planned.

== Format ==
The basic format of the show is that overweight contestants compete to win a cash prize by losing the highest percentage of their starting body weight.

In its first two series, it was an individual competition, although the contestants trained together in teams, and immunity from elimination was initially based on team competitions. The "red team" was trained by Angie Dowds, who adopted a hard no-nonsense approach. The "blue team" was trained by Mark Bailey, who trained with a more nurturing approach.

The third series switched to a new "couples" format, where eight pairs of friends, relatives or colleagues started together for the first 5 weeks, before splitting into a "black team", trained by Dowds, and a "blue team", trained by Richard Callender, and started competing against each other, as in the first two series.

In the first two series, the winner received £25,000 in cash. In the third series the prize was reduced to £10,000, but reverted to £25,000 for the fourth series.

== Series overview ==
Series	Start	Finish	Winner	Weight loss at final	Presenter	Trainers
1	6 October 2005	15 December 2005	Aaron Howlett	211 pounds (96 kg; 15 st 1 lb)	Vicki Butler-Henderson	Mark Bailey; Angie Dowds
2	11 October 2006	27 December 2006	Jodie Prenger	119 pounds (54 kg; 8 st 7 lb)	Vicki Butler-Henderson	Mark Bailey; Angie Dowds
3	27 April 2009	19 June 2009	Kevin Sage	132 pounds (60 kg; 9 st 6 lb)	Kate Garraway	Richard Callender; Angie Dowds
4	10 January 2011	28 February 2011	Wil Graham	119 pounds (54 kg; 8 st 7 lb)	Davina McCall	Richard Callender; Angie Dowds
5	3 January 2012	13 March 2012	Kevin McLernon	180 pounds (82 kg; 12 st 12 lb)	Davina McCall	Richard Callender; Charlotte Ord; Rob Edmond

== Locations ==
The first few weeks of the competition were recorded at Stanford Hall, Leicestershire (known as "The Biggest Loser House"). For one week, all the contestants travelled to the USA. The final was pre-recorded at The London Studios in 2011 and The Maidstone Studios in 2012.
