= Fat Friends The Musical =

2018 musical

Fat Friends
- The Musical
- Official production art
- Music: Nick Lloyd Webber
- Lyrics: Kay Mellor
- Book: Kay Mellor
- Basis: Fat Friends by Kay Mellor
- Premiere: 7 November 2017: Grand Theatre, Leeds
- Productions: 2017 Leeds; 2018 UK tour

Fat Friends The Musical is a stage musical by Kay Mellor with music by Nick Lloyd Webber, based on Mellor's ITV series Fat Friends.

== Production history ==
=== Original Leeds and UK tour (2017–18) ===
The musical made its world premiere at the Grand Theatre, Leeds in November 2017, prior to a UK tour from January to June 2018. The tour starred Jodie Prenger as Kelly, Andrew "Freddie" Flintoff in his musical theatre debut as Kevin (alternating with Joel Montague in certain venues), Sam Bailey as Betty (Elaine C. Smith at certain venues), Kevin Kennedy as Fergus, Natalie Anderson as Lauren, Natasha Hamilton as Julia Fleshman and Rachael Wooding as Joanne.

In June 2021, it was announced the show would embark on a second UK tour opening at the Orchard Theatre, Dartford from January 2022 before touring across the UK until July 2022 starring Jessica Ellis as Kelly, Lee Mead as Kevin, Les Dennis as Fergus and Sherrie Hewson as Julia Fleshman. However the tour was postponed due to the impact of COVID-19 pandemic.

== Musical numbers ==
Act I

- "Move It" - Lauren and Ensemble
- "Be My Man" - Kelly
- "Big And Battered" - Fergus and Alan
- "Corset Song" - Kelly, Joanne, Betty and Lauren
- "What Happened" - Kelly, Joanne, Betty and Lauren
- "Stuck On You" - Kelly and Kevin
- "Mr. Someone" - Lauren and Paul
- "Step Up" - Lauren, Alan and Ensemble
- "Diets Are Crap" - Kelly
- "Going Global" - Joanne, Alan, Betty and Ensemble
- "Stinking Rich" - Julia and Ensemble
- "Beautiful" - Kelly

Act II

- "The Slimmer's Club" - Ensemble
- "Chocolate" - Val, Kelly, Betty and Ensemble
- "Fun Boy" - Kelly and Female Ensemble
- "The Only Fool Is Me" - Kevin
- "If You Don't Want To Marry Him" - Betty, Fergus and Kelly
- "Love Who You Are" - Ensemble

== Cast and characters ==
Character	Leeds and UK tour
Character	2017-18
Kelly Stevenson	Jodie Prenger
Kevin Murgatroyd	Andrew "Freddie" Flintoff Joel Montague
Betty Stevenson	Sam Bailey Elaine C Smith
Joanne Stevenson / Pippa	Rachael Wooding
Fergus Stevenson	Kevin Kennedy
Lauren	Natalie Anderson
Paul	Jonathan Halliwell
Julia Fleshman	Natasha Hamilton
Alan	Neil Hurst
Val	Chloe Hart
Brian Combrè	Ryan Pidgen
