= Jenna Lee-James =

British singer (born 1976)

Jenna Lee-James (born in 1976) is a Scottish singer and performer who has played the part of Scaramouche in the West End version of the hit musical We Will Rock You. She also appeared in West End at Home which played at a variety of theatres including the Mayflower Theatre, Southampton. She appeared as the Narrator in Joseph and the Amazing Technicolor Dreamcoat at the Adelphi Theatre, London alongside Gareth Gates. She played the role of Elsa in Frozen the Musical in the West End while Samantha Barks was on maternity leave.

Lee-James was born in Clydebank in 1976, where she started her career at the age of 10 in pantomime at the King's Theatre. She also played July in Annie, Maisie in The Boy Friend and Dorothy in The Wizard of Oz, all at the Kings.

She began her professional career on a tour of Bobby Davro's Rock with Laughter. Other theatre credits include Tiger Lily in Peter Pan at the Theatre Royal, Newcastle with Leslie Grantham and Joe Pasquale; Lorraine in the UK tour of Boogie Nights with Shane Richie; principal singer in the tour Money Money Money – The Real ABBA Story; and Peter Pan at the Grand Theatre Swansea with Dora Bryan, John Challis and Mike Doyle.

Lee-James was runner-up in the Voice of Musical Theatre 2005 competition held at the New Theatre, Cardiff.

In 2008 Lee-James recorded a song for the CD Act One – Songs From The Musicals Of Alexander S. Bermange, an album of 20 brand new recordings by 26 West End stars, released in November 2008 on Dress Circle Records.

== Television credits ==
Lee-James's television credits include Parkinson (BBC), Party in the Palace (BBC), Party in the Park (Channel 5) and Children in Need (BBC).

== Theatre credits ==
She played the leading role of Scaramouche in We Will Rock You after playing an ensemble role and first understudy for the roles Scaramouche and Meatloaf at the Dominion Theatre in London.

After five and a half years, she said goodbye to the Dominion and Scary Bush on 29 September 2007. She played Scaramouche for one and a half years, Meatloaf for another one and a half years, and for two and a half years she was in the ensemble. She played the Narrator in Joseph and the Amazing Technicolor Dreamcoat at the Adelphi Theatre in London, until the show closed in May 2009.

She toured with a Queen tribute show in Scandinavia, with Anders Ekborg, and other West End performers, in November 2007.

During 2012 she toured in Street of Dreams, based on the hit British soap opera Coronation Street, in which she performed as Becky McDonald, originally played by Katherine Kelly, singing the song "If It's Too Late".

In 2023, she played the starring role of Elsa in the West End production of Frozen during Samantha Barks' maternity leave.

She tours internationally performing in gigs and concerts. Her personal life is very private.
