= The Biggest Loser (British TV series) series 5 =

The Biggest Loser
- Series 5
- Starring: Richard Callender; Charlotte Ord; Rob Edmond
- No. of episodes: 9

Release
- Original network: ITV, STV, UTV
- Original release: 3 January – 13 March 2012

Series chronology
- ← Previous; Series 4

The Biggest Loser UK 2012 is the fifth series of the reality television show titled The Biggest Loser. The series began on ITV on 3 January 2012 and ended on 13 March 2012, with seven overweight pairs (fourteen individuals) competing for a cash prize. Davina McCall is featured as the host, with trainer Richard Callender and two new trainers, Charlotte Ord and Rob Edmond, who replaced Angie Dowds. Dowds had left the show part-way through the fourth season, although she returned for the final. Dowds died on 23 November 2011 in an apparent suicide. The prize of £25,000 was won by Kevin McLernon, who shed 40% of his body weight.

== Contestants ==
There are 14 contestants in this season, competing as 7 teams of two.

Name	Couples Team	3 Teams	Individuals	Status	Total votes
Geoff, 59, Haverfordwest	Yellow Team			Withdrew - medical issues	^{[E1]}
Sam, 26, Keighley	Brown Team			Eliminated Week 1	1^{[E2]}
Damien, 21, Dublin	Brown Team			Eliminated Week 2	3
Amy, 25, Stockton-on-Tees	Red Team			Eliminated Week 3	3
Gemma, 25, Stockton-on-Tees	Red Team			Eliminated Week 3	3
Laura, 28, Rotherham	Pink Team	Black Team		Eliminated Week 4	2
Diane, 53, Rotherham	Pink Team	Blue Team		Eliminated Week 5	Elimination Challenge
Tamara, 22, Brixton	Purple Team	White Team		Eliminated Week 6	2
Gerard, 24, Limerick	Green Team	Black Team	Green Individual	Eliminated Week 7	3
Jessie, 22, Brixton	Purple Team	Black Team	Purple Individual	Eliminated Week 8	0 (Red line)
Paula, 31, Limerick	Green Team	Blue Team	Green Individual	Eliminated Week 8	0 (Red line)
Sarah, 29, Haverfordwest	Yellow Team	White Team	Yellow Individual	Third Place	
Amy Mac, 23, South Shields	Orange Team	White Team	Orange Individual	Second Place	
Kevin, 38, Sunderland	Orange Team	Blue Team	Orange Individual	The Biggest Loser	

The "Total Votes" column indicates the number of votes cast against the contestant when he/she was eliminated.
^[E1] Geoff was forced to withdraw by the doctor, due to having an undiagnosed heart attack. He did not weigh in at any point during the series, including the finale.
^[E2] The contestants voted for Sam & Damien to go home, but as a result of Geoff's withdrawal, one of them was allowed to stay. Their fate was to be decided by the biggest loser, but as Damien was below the yellow line, Kevin became the biggest loser for the week and sent Sam home.

== Weigh-ins ==
Contestant	Age	Starting weight	Week								Finale	Weight lost	Percentage lost
Contestant	Age	Starting weight	1	2	3	4	5	6	7	8	Finale	Weight lost	Percentage lost
Kevin	38	450	419	408	401	392	383	379	369	358	270	-180	-40.00%
Amy Mac	23	266	255	249	245	238	232	227	223	214	179	-87	-32.71%
Sarah	29	276	260	256	254	251	245	243	237	231	204	-72	-26.09%
Jessie	22	263	254	249	244	241	231	227	223	216	157	-106	-40.30%~
Paula	31	261	255	250	249	242	238	235	231	225	203	-58	-22.22%
Gerard	24	278	260	250	241	238	227	223	221		195	-83	-29.86%
Tamara	22	276	266	260	256	250	248	248			205	-71	-25.72%
Diane	53	270	256	252	250	245	242				197	-73	-27.04%
Laura	28	222	211	206	204	199					159	-63	-28.38%
Amy	25	270	261	252	251						202	-68	-25.19%
Gemma	25	267	253	251	247						178	-89	-33.33%
Damien	21	357	331	325							301	-56	-15.69%
Sam	26	329	307								264	-65	-19.76%
Geoff	59	272									Did not attend		

Winners
£25,000 winner (among the finalists)
Holiday winner (among the eliminated contestants)
Standings
Week's Biggest Loser
Week's Biggest Loser & Immunity
Immunity (Challenge or Weigh-In)
Under the Yellow Line
Week's Biggest Loser & Under the Yellow Line
Highest Percentage Weight Loss (among the eliminated contestants)

=== Weigh-in figures history ===
Contestant	Week								Finale
Contestant	1	2	3	4	5	6	7	8	Finale
Kevin	-31	-11	-7	-9	-9	-4	-9**	-11	-88
Amy Mac	-11	-6	-4	-7	-6	-5	-4	-9	-35
Sarah	-16	-3*	-2	-3	-6	-2	-6	-6	-27
Jessie	-9	-5	-5	-3	-10	-4	-4	-7	-59
Paula	-6	-5	-1	-7	-4	-3	-4	-6	-22
Gerard	-18	-10	-9	-3	-11	-4	-2		-26
Tamara	-10	-6	-4	-6	-2	0			-43
Diane	-14	-4	-2	-5	-3				-45
Laura	-11	-5	-2	-5					-40
Amy	-9	-9	-1						-49
Gemma	-14	-2	-4						-69
Damien	-26	-5*							-24
Sam	-22								-43
Geoff									

Notes

- *In week 2, Damien's and Sarah's weight losses were displayed at -5 and -3 respectively due to their one-pound disadvantages from the weekly challenge.
- **In week 7, Kevin's weight loss was displayed at -9 due to his one-pound disadvantage from the weekly challenge.

=== Weigh-in percentages history ===
Contestant	Week								Finale	Total
Contestant	1	2	3	4	5	6	7	8	Finale	Total
Kevin	-6.89%	-2.63%	-1.72%	-2.24%	-2.30%	-1.04%	-2.37%	-2.98%	-24.58%	-40.00%
Amy Mac	-4.14%	-2.35%	-1.61%	-2.86%	-2.52%	-2.16%	-1.76%	-4.04%	-16.36%	-32.71%
Sarah	-5.80%	-1.15%*	-0.78%	-1.18%	-2.39%	-0.82%	-2.74%	-2.53%	-11.69%	-26.09%
Paula	-2.30%	-1.96%	-0.40%	-2.81%	-1.65%	-1.26%	-1.70%	-2.60%	-9.78%	-22.22%
Jessie	-3.42%	-1.97%	-2.01%	-1.23%	-4.15%	-1.73%	-1.76%	-3.14%	-27.31%	-40.30%
Gerard	-6.47%	-3.85%	-3.60%	-1.24%	-4.62%	-1.76%	-0.90%		-11.76%	-29.86%
Tamara	-3.62%	-2.26%	-1.54%	-2.34%	-0.80%	0.00%			-17.34%	-25.72%
Diane	-5.19%	-1.56%	-0.79%	-2.00%	-1.22%				-18.60%	-27.04%
Laura	-4.95%	-2.37%	-0.97%	-2.45%					-20.10%	-28.34%
Amy	-3.33%	-3.45%	-0.40%						-19.52%	-25.19%
Gemma	-5.24%	-0.79%	-1.59%						-30.74%	-35.74%
Damien	-7.28%	-1.51%*							-7.38%	-15.69%
Sam	-6.69%								-14.01%	-19.76%
Geoff										

Notes

- In week 2, Damien's and Sarah's weight loss percentages were displayed at -1.51% and -1.15% respectively due to their one-pound disadvantages from the weekly challenge.

== Elimination voting history ==
Contestant
Contestant	Week 1	Week 2	Week 3	Week 4	Week 5	Week 6	Week 7	Week 8
Eliminated	Geoff, Sam	Damien	Gemma, Amy	Laura	Diane	Tamara	Gerard	Paula, Jessie
Kevin	?	?	Gemma & Amy	X	X	X	Gerard	X
Amy Mac	?	?	Gemma & Amy	X	X	Tamara	?	X
Sarah	Sam & Damien	X	Gemma & Amy	X	X	Tamara	Gerard	X
Paula	Sam & Damien	Damien	?	X	X	X	X	X
Jessie	X	?	Gemma & Amy	Laura	X	X	Gerard	X
Gerard	Sam & Damien	Damien	?	Laura	X	X	X	Eliminated Week 7
Tamara	X	?	Gemma & Amy	X	X	?	Eliminated Week 6	
Diane	?	Damien	X	X	X	Eliminated Week 5		
Laura	?	Damien	X	Gerard	Eliminated Week 4			
Amy	Sam & Damien	Damien	X	Eliminated Week 3				
Gemma	Sam & Damien	Damien	X	Eliminated Week 3				
Damien	X	X	Eliminated Week 2					
Sam	X	Eliminated Week 1						
Geoff	Withdrew Week 1							

X Not in house for vote
Immunity
? Immunity, vote not revealed
X Immunity, was below yellow line or not in elimination, unable to vote
X Below yellow line, unable to vote
X Below red line
X Not in elimination, unable to vote
Eliminated or not in house
Last person eliminated
Valid vote cast
? Vote not revealed
£25,000 winner (among the finalists)

== Ratings ==
Episode	Date	Total Viewers	Share	Source
1	3 January 2012	2,800,000	11.2%	
2	10 January 2012	2,670,000	11.0%	
3	17 January 2012	2,160,000	9.0%	
4	24 January 2012	2,140,000	8.6%	
5	31 January 2012	2,180,000	9.0%	
6	7 February 2012	2,400,000	10.4%	
7	14 February 2012	2,130,000	8.5%	
8	28 February 2012	2,210,000	9.3%	
9	13 March 2012	2,480,000	10.0%	
