= The Biggest Loser (British TV series) series 4 =

The Biggest Loser
- Season 4
- Starring: Davina McCall (host); Angie Dowds (trainer); Richard Callender (trainer)
- No. of episodes: 8

Release
- Original network: ITV, STV, UTV
- Original release: 10 January – 28 February 2011

Series chronology
- ← Previous; Series 3 Next → Series 5

The Biggest Loser UK 2011 is the fourth season of the reality television series entitled The Biggest Loser. The season began airing on ITV on 10 January 2011, with seven overweight couples (fourteen individuals) competing for a cash prize of £25,000. Davina McCall is featured as the new host, with trainers Angie Dowds and Richard Callender.

== Contestants ==
Contestant	Couples Team	Black vs. Blue	Status	Total Votes
Big G, 28, London	Grey Team		Injury, Left Week 1	0
Laura, 21, Middleton	Red Team		Eliminated Week 1	3
Janet, 40, Manchester	Red Team		Eliminated Week 1	3
Paul, 38, Blackburn	Orange Team		Eliminated Week 2	3
Joanne, 39, Blackburn	Orange Team		Eliminated Week 2	3
Sara, 40, Basingstoke	Yellow Team		Eliminated Week 3	2
Claire, 35, Basingstoke	Yellow Team	Black Team	Eliminated Week 4	3
Ayanda, 27, London	Pink Team	Blue Team	Eliminated Week 5	3
Rob, 21, Hertfordshire	Grey Team	Black Team	Eliminated Week 6	1
Mark, 44, Jarrow	Light Blue Team	Blue Team	Eliminated Week 7	0
Paddy, 28, Reading	Green Team	Black Team	Eliminated Week 7	0
Zandela, 27, London	Pink Team	Black Team	2nd Runner-Up	0
Karen, 45, Jarrow	Light Blue Team	Blue Team	Runner-Up	0
Will, 29, Reading	Green Team	Blue Team	Winner	0

== Teams ==
=== Couples Teams (Week 1-3) ===
Team	Contestant	Black vs. Blue
Grey	Big G	
Grey	Rob	Black
Red	Laura	
Red	Janet	
Orange	Paul	
Orange	Joanne	
Yellow	Sara	
Yellow	Claire	Black
Pink	Ayanda	Blue
Pink	Zandela	Black
Light Blue	Mark	Blue
Light Blue	Karen	Blue
Green	Paddy	Black
Green	Will	Blue

=== Black vs Blue (Week 4-7) ===
Black vs. Blue	Contestant	Couples Team
Blue	Ayanda	Pink
Blue	Mark	Light Blue
Blue	Karen	Light Blue
Blue	Will	Green
Black	Claire	Yellow
Black	Rob	Grey
Black	Paddy	Green
Black	Zandela	Pink

== Weigh-ins ==
Contestant	Age	Starting weight	Week							Finale	Weight lost	Percentage lost
Contestant	Age	Starting weight	1	2	3	4	5	6	7	Finale	Weight lost	Percentage lost
Will	29	343	328	317	308	306	297	290	283	224	119	34.69%
Karen	45	285	272	263	258	254	251	247	241	207	78	27.37%
Zandela	27	270	259	253	247	247	239	236	233	200	70	25.93%
Paddy	28	295	287	280	273	273	265	260	256	203	92	31.19%
Mark	44	440	426	419	409	406	397	389	385	340	100	22.73%
Rob	21	313	299	291	284	283	275	270		269	44	14.06%
Ayanda	27	241	229	224	219	218	213			191	50	20.75%
Claire	35	313	296	291	286	280				223	90	28.75%
Sara	40	240	231	227	223					180	60	25.00%
Joanne	39	247	238	236						213	34	13.77%
Paul	38	348	333	326						298	50	14.37%
Janet	40	245	235							204	41	16.73%
Laura	21	211	206							185	26	12.32%
Big G	28	364								302	62	17.03%

Winners
£25,000 Winner (among the finalists)
Holiday Winner (among the non-finalists)
Standings.
Week's Biggest Loser/Highest Percentage Weight Loss (Finalist)
Week's Biggest Loser & Immunity.
Immunity (Challenge or Weigh-In).
Highest Percentage Weight Loss (Non-finalist).

=== Weigh-in figures history ===
Contestant	Age	Starting weight	Week							Finale
Contestant	Age	Starting weight	1	2	3	4	5	6	7	Finale
Will	29	24 st 7 lb	-15	-11	-9	-2	-9	-7	-7	-59
Karen	45	20 st 5 lb	-13	-9	-5	-4	-3	-4	-6	-34
Zandela	27	19 st 4 lb	-11	-6	-6	0	-8	-3	-4	-32
Paddy	28	21 st 1 lb	-8	-7	-7	0	-8	-5	-4	-53
Mark	44	31 st 6 lb	-14	-7	-10	-3	-9	-8	-4	-45
Rob	21	22 st 5 lb	-14	-8	-7	-1	-8	-5		-1
Ayanda	27	17 st 3 lb	-12	-5	-5	-1	-5			-22
Claire	35	22 st 5 lb	-17	-5	-5	-6				-57
Sara	40	17 st 2 lb	-9	-4	-4					-43
Joanne	39	17 st 9 lb	-9	-2						-25
Paul	38	24 st 12 lb	-15	-7						-28
Janet	40	17 st 7 lb	-10							-31
Laura	21	15 st 1 lb	-5							-21
Big G	28	26 st								-62

=== Weigh-in percentages history ===
Contestant	Age	Starting weight	Week							Finale	Total
Contestant	Age	Starting weight	1	2	3	4	5	6	7	Finale	Total
Will	29	24 st 7 lb	-4.37%	-3.35%	-2.84%	-0.65%	-2.94%	-2.36%	-2.41%	-20.85%	-34.69%
Karen	45	20 st 5 lb	4.56%	-3.31%	-1.90%	-1.55%	-1.18%	-1.59%	-2.43%	-14.11%	-27.37%
Zandela	27	19 st 4 lb	-4.07%	-2.32%	-2.37%	0.00%	-3.24%	-1.26%	-1.27%	-14.16%	-25.93%
Paddy	28	21 st 1 lb	-2.59%	-2.33%	-2.38%	0.00%	-2.79%	-1.79%	-1.46%	-19.63%	-31.19%
Mark	44	31 st 6 lb	-3.18%	-1.64%	-2.39%	-0.73%	-2.22%	-2.02%	-1.03%	-11.69%	-22.73%
Rob	21	22 st 5 lb	-4.47%	-2.68%	-2.41%	-0.35%	-2.83%	-1.82%		-0.37%	-14.06%
Ayanda	27	17 st 3 lb	-4.98%	-2.18%	-2.23%	-0.46%	-2.29%			-10.33%	-20.75%
Claire	35	22 st 5 lb	-5.43%	-1.69%	-1.72%	-2.10%				-20.36%	-28.75%
Sara	40	17 st 2 lb	-3.75%	-1.73%	-1.76%					-19.28%	-25.00%
Joanne	39	17 st 9 lb	-3.64%	-0.84%						-10.59%	-14.57%
Paul	38	24 st 12 lb	-4.31%	-2.10%						-8.59%	-14.37%
Janet	40	17 st 7 lb	-4.08%							-13.19%	-16.73%
Laura	21	15 st 1 lb	-2.37%							-12.62%	-14.69%
Big G	28	26 st								-17.03%	-17.03%

=== Elimination voting history ===
Name	Week						
Name	1	2	3	4	5	6	7
Eliminated	Janet & Laura	Joanne & Paul	Sara	Claire	Ayanda	Rob	Paddy, Mark
Will	Janet & Laura	Paul & Joanne	Claire & Sara	X	Ayanda	X	X
Karen	Zandela & Ayanda	Paul & Joanne	X	X	Ayanda	X	X
Zandela	X	?	Claire & Sara	Claire	X	X	X
Paddy	Janet & Laura	Paul & Joanne	Claire & Sara	Claire	X	Rob	X
Mark	Zandela & Ayanda	Paul & Joanne	X	X	Ayanda	X	X
Rob	Janet & Laura	Paul & Joanne	?	Claire	X	X	
Ayanda	X	?	Claire & Sara	X	Mark		
Claire	Janet & Laura	X	X	Zandela			
Sara	Janet & Laura	X	X				
Joanne	?	X					
Paul	?	X					
Janet	X						
Laura	X						
Big G	LEFT						

== Ratings ==
Episode Viewing figures from BARB

Episode	Date	Total Viewers	ITV Weekly Ranking
1	10 January 2011	3,940,000	26
2	17 January 2011	4,000,000	21
3	24 January 2011	3,880,000	22
4	31 January 2011	3,990,000	26
5	7 February 2011	4,080,000	20
6	14 February 2011	4,180,000	22
7	21 February 2011	4,000,000	22
8	28 February 2011	4,810,000	18
