= The Biggest Loser (British TV series) series 2 =

The Biggest Loser
- Season 2
- Starring: Vicki Butler-Henderson (host); Angie Dowds (trainer); Mark Bailey (trainer)
- No. of episodes: 12

Release
- Original network: LIVINGtv
- Original release: 11 October – 27 December 2006

Series chronology
- ← Previous; Series 1 Next → Series 3

The Biggest Loser UK Series 2 was the second British series of the reality TV weight loss show The Biggest Loser. The 12 contestants on the show were split into two teams who were trained by fitness trainers Mark Bailey and Angie Dowds. The series had 12 episodes that aired weekly on LIVINGtv from 11 October to 27 December 2006. The episode with the highest viewership numbers was episode 11, which aired on 20 December and was seen by 200,000 viewers. The winner of the series was Jodie Prenger who lost 46.85% of her starting body weight and won £25,000.

== Weigh Ins ==
Teams
Member of Angie's team.
Member of Mark's team.

- Ben went from the Red Team to the Blue Team in Wk 3.
- Rachel was not present at the finale.

Game
Last person eliminated before the finale.
Winners
£25,000 Winner (among the finalists).
Caribbean Trip Winner (among the eliminated players).

Contestant	Age	Starting weight	Week										Final Results		
Contestant	Age	Starting weight	1	2	3	4	5	6	7	8	9	10	Final Weight	Weight Loss	Percentage
Jodie	26	18 st 2 lb	17 st 7 lb	17 st 2 lb	16 st 12 lb	16 st 4 lb	15 st 13 lb	15 st 9 lb	15 st 3 lb	14 st 12 lb	14 st 6 lb	13 st 13 lb	9 st 9 lb	8 st 7 lb	46.85%
Lee	30	27 st 13 lb	26 st 9 lb	26 st 2 lb	25 st 12 lb	25 st	24 st 7 lb	23 st 9 lb	22 st 13 lb	22 st 9 lb	22 st 1 lb	21 st 11 lb	17 st 7 lb	10 st 6 lb	37.24%
Ben	21	20 st 10 lb	19 st 9 lb	19 st 1 lb	18 st 10 lb	18 st 4 lb	17 st 9 lb	17 st 3 lb	16 st 11 lb	16 st 8 lb	16 st 3 lb	15 st 6 lb	14 st 9 lb	6 st 1 lb	29.31%
Amos	25	24 st 2 lb	23 st 9 lb	23 st 2 lb	23 st						21 st 7 lb	20 st 11 lb	20 st 2 lb	4 st	16.57%
Liz	24	16 st 1 lb	15 st 9 lb	15 st 5 lb	15 st	14 st 9 lb	14 st 9 lb	14 st 2 lb	13 st 12 lb	13 st 7 lb	13 st 8 lb		13 st 8 lb	2 st 7 lb	15.56%
Andrew	28	26 st 4 lb	25 st 5 lb	25 st	24 st 5 lb	23 st 8 lb	23 st 3 lb	22 st 9 lb	22 st 1 lb	21 st 13 lb			16 st 8 lb	9 st 10 lb	36.96%
Alexis	23	18 st 13 lb	18 st 4 lb	18 st	17 st 9 lb	17 st 6 lb	17 st 2 lb	17 st 1 lb	16 st 10 lb				14 st 1 lb	4 st 12 lb	25.66%
Alan	35	27 st 5 lb	26 st 2 lb	25 st 8 lb	25 st 3 lb	24 st 9 lb	24 st 1 lb	23 st 9 lb					20 st 8 lb	6 st 11 lb	24.80%
Mathew	22	18 st 10 lb	17 st 13 lb	17 st 8 lb	17 st 3 lb	16 st 8 lb	15 st 13 lb						12 st 11 lb	5 st 13 lb	31.68%
Helenka	35	17 st 1 lb	16 st 9 lb	16 st 8 lb	16 st 3 lb	15 st 13 lb							14 st 6 lb	2 st 9 lb	15.48%
Ola	30	16 st 4 lb	15 st 11 lb	15 st 12 lb									15 st 10 lb	8 lb	3.51%
Rachel	24	17 st 6 lb	17 st										x	x	x

== Ratings ==
Episode Viewing figures from BARB

Episode	Date	Total Viewers	LIVINGtv Weekly Ranking
1	11 October 2006	Under 188,000	Outside Top 10
2	18 October 2006	Under 169,000	Outside Top 10
3	25 October 2006	Under 140,000	Outside Top 10
4	1 November 2006	Under 150,000	Outside Top 10
5	8 November 2006	Under 154,000	Outside Top 10
6	15 November 2006	Under 205,000	Outside Top 10
7	22 November 2006	Under 213,000	Outside Top 10
8	29 November 2006	Under 176,000	Outside Top 10
9	6 December 2006	Under 186,000	Outside Top 10
10	13 December 2006	Under 194,000	Outside Top 10
11	20 December 2006	200,000	6
12	27 December 2006	Under 160,000	Outside Top 10
