= Neil Hurst =

English actor (born 1982)

- Neil Hurst at the 2019 Up North Film and TV Festival
- Born: 5 June 1982 (age 44); Halifax, West Yorkshire, England
- Occupations: Actor, television presenter

Neil Hurst (born 5 June 1982) is an English actor and presenter born in Halifax, West Yorkshire, best known for his television and stage theatre career.

== Early life ==
Hurst was educated at The Brooksbank School and attended the University of Huddersfield.

== Film and television career ==
Hurst first gained prominence on British television as the comic sidekick of Vernon Kay on ITV's All Star Family Fortunes, but his career has seen him appear in many other TV roles from drama to comedy and even presenting.

His TV credits include Benny Grew in the 2018 adaptation of Agatha Christie's The A.B.C. Murders, Baz in Coronation Street, Ray Glossop in Doctors, Peter in Fresh Meat, Frank in The Syndicate and Gary Plunkett in Home From Home. In addition to this he has appeared in small cameo roles in Casualty, Moving On and 4 O'Clock Club.

In 2019, Hurst began appearing as a series regular on Michael McIntyre's Big Show helping Michael McIntyre prank the Unexpected Star of the show. These episodes were filmed at the London Palladium.

In 2020, Hurst appeared as Baz for a short run in Coronation Street, plus cameo roles in Ackley Bridge and The Syndicate.

2021 saw Hurst joining the cast of All Creatures Great and Small as Harold Ingledew, the annoying neighbour of Siegfried. Hurst also filmed the role of a teacher in The Railway Children Return.

== Theatre career ==
In 2018, Hurst, and Coronation Street actress Vicky Binns, joined the original cast of Craig Cash's and Phil Mealey's sitcom Early Doors, in the live stage version of the show. Hurst was playing the role of 'Freddie' (a replacement character for Mark Benton's character, 'Eddie') and toured arenas in the UK after sold out run at The Lowry, Salford. Hurst reprised his role at The Lowry for the 2019 production of Early Doors: One More Chance.

In 2017, Hurst originated the role of Alan in Kay Mellor's Fat Friends The Musical, the musical premièred at the Grand Theatre, Leeds in November 2017, prior to a UK tour from January to June 2018. While appearing in the musical, Hurst was nominated for best actor in the Entertainment Views Awards.

For a decade, 2009 to 2019, he appeared at the Victoria Theatre, Halifax each Christmas in their annual pantomime, clocking up almost 1000 performances on the stage. On 28 February 2019, Hurst announced his departure from the Victoria Theatre pantomime after 10 years. Since his departure from Halifax, he has been appearing in pantomime for Qdos Entertainment.

In 2020, Hurst co-wrote an adult pantomime, Cinderella, with Jodie Prenger for the Turbine Theatre. Starring Rufus Hound, Scott Paige, Debbie Kurup, Oscar Conlon-Morrey, Sean Parkins and Daisy Wood Davis, the run of the show was cut short due to lockdown restrictions due to the COVID-19 pandemic.

Other theatre roles include Bouncers, Evita, Joseph and the Amazing Technicolor Dreamcoat, Michael Frayn's Matchbox Theatre, Lost In Yonkers, The Last Five Years and The Wizard of Oz.

In December 2022, Hurst appeared at the Hull New Theatre in their pantomime, Jack and the Beanstalk, alongside Gareth Gates in the lead role.

From 2024, he starred as Edna Turnblad in the Hairspray The Musical UK & Ireland Tour.

== Presenting ==
In 2016, Hurst presented a documentary in the United States called Hopping The Pond. The show was a documentary about craft beers of America. Filming took place in Duluth, Minnesota and Grand Marais, Minnesota

He also co-hosted the weekly 'Mishaps Podcast' with the Emmerdale actress, Natalie Anderson and musical theatre actor, Jodie Prenger Hurst also narrates many TV documentaries.
