= The Biggest Loser (British TV series) series 1 =

The Biggest Loser
- Season 1
- Starring: Vicki Butler-Henderson (host); Angie Dowds (trainer); Mark Bailey (trainer)
- No. of episodes: 11

Release
- Original network: LIVINGtv
- Original release: 6 October – 15 December 2005

Series chronology
- Next → Series 2

The Biggest Loser UK 2005 was the first season of the reality television series entitled The Biggest Loser. The season first aired on 6 October 2005, with the final episode on 15 December 2005, where 12 overweight contestants competed for a cash prize of £25,000. Vicki Butler-Henderson was featured as the host, with trainers Angie Dowds and Mark Bailey. Aaron Howlett was named as the winner after losing 9 st 12 lb.

== Contestants ==
Contestant	Age	Hometown	Team	Starting Weight	Status	Weight lost as of Elimination	Weight at Reunion	Weight lost (Reunion)	Percentage of Weight Lost	Body Fat Percentage Loss	Total Score
Tracey Barcoe	28	Northwich	Red Team	20 st 2 lbs	Eliminated Week 1	4 pounds (1.8 kg; 4.0 lb)	18 st	30 pounds (14 kg; 2 st 2 lb)	10.6%	3.2%	13.8
Katie Wareing	30	Preston	Blue Team	15 st 3 lbs	Eliminated Week 2	15 pounds (6.8 kg; 1 st 1 lb)	12 st 5 lbs	40 pounds (18 kg; 2 st 12 lb)	18.8%	9.7%	28.5
Paul Tabram	31	Swansea	Red Team	18 st 11 lbs	Eliminated Week 3	15 pounds (6.8 kg; 1 st 1 lb)	15 st 6 lbs	47 pounds (21 kg; 3 st 5 lb)	17.9%	5.6%	23.5
Tamara Joseph	30	Birmingham	Red Team	21 st 3 lbs	Eliminated Week 4	15 pounds (6.8 kg; 1 st 1 lb)	18 st 8 lbs	37 pounds (17 kg; 2 st 9 lb)	12.5%	7.0%	19.5
Dr Shane Lee	40	Cardiff	Blue/Red^{[swap]}	22 st 3 lbs	Eliminated Week 5	33 pounds (15 kg; 2 st 5 lb)	x	Did not appear	x	x	x
Martin Langmaid	26	Exeter	Blue Team	18 st 9 lbs	Eliminated Week 6	??	See below				
Nat Curtis	31	Reading	Blue Team	15 st 11 lbs	Eliminated Week 7	25 pounds (11 kg; 1 st 11 lb)	See below				
Barney Gibson	19	Tiverton	Red Team	21 st 1 lb	Withdrew Week 8^{[replace]}	38 pounds (17 kg; 2 st 10 lb)	15 st 1 lb	84 pounds (38 kg; 6 st 0 lb)	28.5%	17.9%	46.4
Nadine Lautman	33	West Yorkshire	Red Team	16 st 8 lbs	Eliminated Week 8	25 pounds (11 kg; 1 st 11 lb)	12 st 10 lbs	54 pounds (24 kg; 3 st 12 lb)	23.3%	12.5%	35.8
Martin Langmaid	Returned Wk 8^{[replace]}		Blue Team	x	Eliminated Week 9	44 pounds (20 kg; 3 st 2 lb)	14 st 1 lb	64 pounds (29 kg; 4 st 8 lb)	24.5%	19.2%	43.7
Samantha Atkins	33	London	Blue Team	23 st 6 lbs	Eliminated Week 10	??	17 st 3 lbs	87 pounds (39 kg; 6 st 3 lb)	26.5%	10.5%	37.0
Nat Curtis	Returned Wk 10		Blue Team	x	Third Place	x	11 st 7 lbs	60 pounds (27 kg; 4 st 4 lb) at Finale	27.1%	14.9%	42.0
Mark Whittaker	38	Manchester	Red Team	24 st 4 lbs	Second Place	x	15 st 9 lbs	121 pounds (55 kg; 8 st 9 lb) at Finale	35.6%	21.6%	57.2
Aaron Howlett	29	Hull	Blue Team	24 st 13 lbs	Biggest Loser	x	15 st 1 lb	138 pounds (63 kg; 9 st 12 lb) at Finale	39.5%	25.4%	64.9

^[swap] Shane was traded from the Blue Team to the Red Team in Week 5 to re-balance the teams.

^[replace] Martin was brought back because Barny had to withdraw due to medical issues.

== Final prizes ==
Contestant	Prize
Aaron Howlett	Main Prize: £25,000
Mark Whittaker	Second Prize: Holiday in the Caribbean
Nat Curtis	Third Prize: Holiday in the Caribbean
Barney Gibson	Eliminated Contestant Prize: Holiday to the Maldives

== Ratings ==
Episode Viewing figures from BARB

Episode	Date	Total Viewers	LIVINGtv Weekly Ranking
1	6 October 2005	Under 180,000	Outside Top 10
2	13 October 2005	210,000	6
3	20 October 2005	193,000	7
4	27 October 2005	181,000	9
5	3 November 2005	Under 199,000	Outside Top 10
6	10 November 2005	Under 138,000	Outside Top 10
7	17 November 2005	Under 203,000	Outside Top 10
8	24 November 2005	180,000	10
9	1 December 2005	Under 200,000	Outside Top 10
10	8 December 2005	Under 175,000	Outside Top 10
11	15 December 2005	216,000	10
