= Tommy Coyle =

Tommy Coyle may refer to:

- Tommy Coyle (boxer) (born 1989), British former professional boxer
- Tommy Coyle (footballer) (born 1959), Scottish former professional football midfielder

== See also ==
- Thomas Coyle (disambiguation)
