= Victoria Theatre, Halifax =

Theatre in Halifax, West Yorkshire, England

Coordinates: 53.721°N 1.862°W

Victoria Theatre
- Victoria Hall, The Civic Theatre
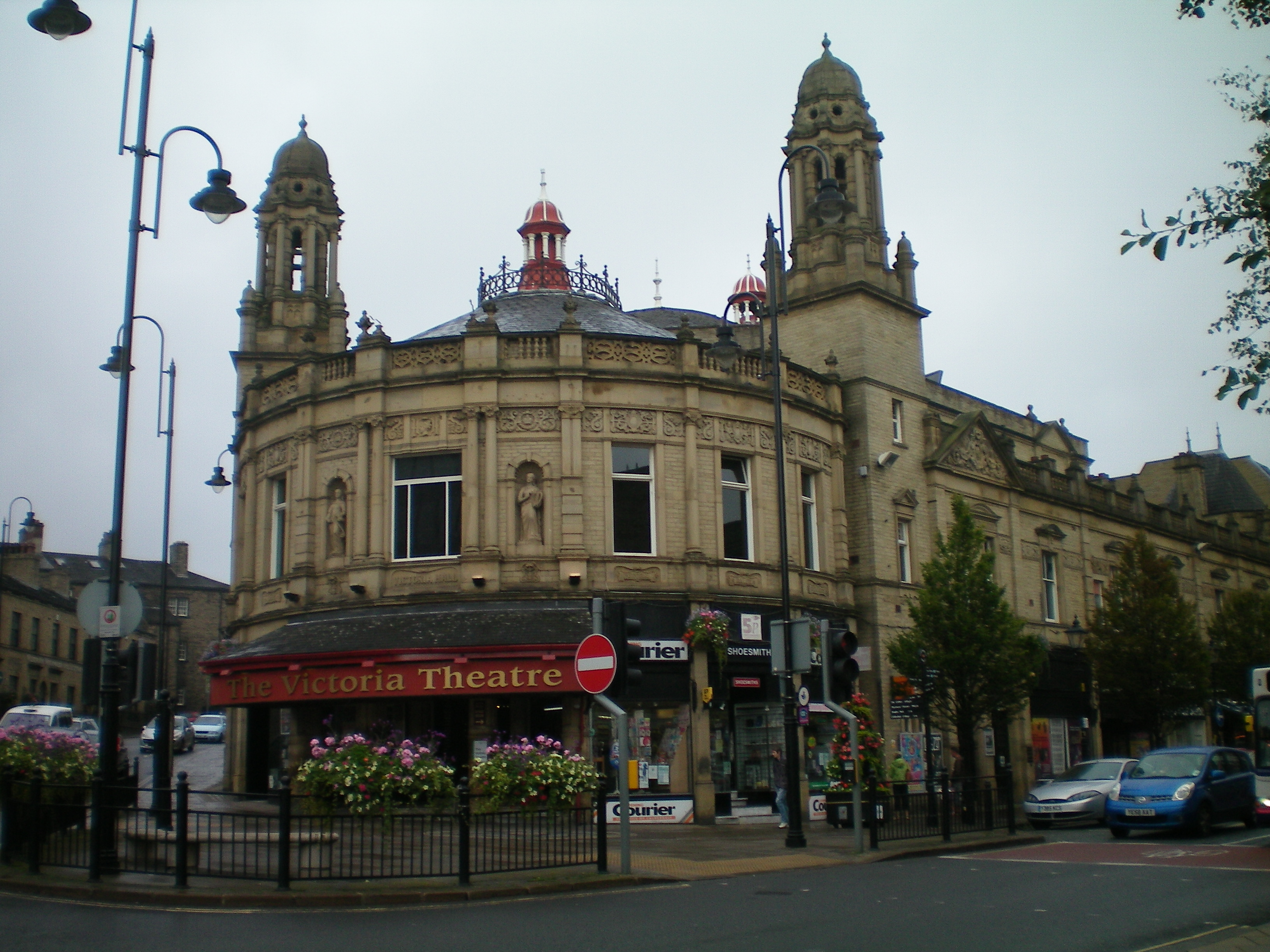
- Interactive map of Victoria Theatre
- Address: 2 Fountain Street; Halifax; England
- Owner: Calderdale Council
- Capacity: 1,512 Seated (1,860 part-standing)

Construction
- Opened: 1901

Website
- www.victoriatheatre.co.uk

Victoria Theatre in Halifax, West Yorkshire, England, is a large theatre and concert hall that opened in 1901.

== History ==
The building was first opened on 8 February 1901, when it was known as the Victoria Hall. In 1960 the hall was purchased by Halifax Borough Council who, after an extensive alteration and repair programme, converted it into a dual-purpose theatre and concert hall and changed the name to The New Victoria.

In 1973 the name was changed to The Civic Theatre, before being renamed The Victoria Theatre in 1993.

The main auditorium has a capacity of 1,512 fully seated (or 1,860 part-standing), and has hosted many high-profile and international performers in addition to supporting a wide range of local community events and activities. The building houses a large pipe organ built by William Hill in 1901 and later rebuilt by Rushworth & Dreaper when the hall received a proscenium stage.

== Notable performances ==
On 10 March 1957, Chris Barber's Jazz Band played at the venue, with Ottilie Patterson, and on 19 May 1961, Acker Bilk performed.

In 2004, British rock band Status Quo first performed at the theatre, and have made frequent visits to the venue. They returned on 12 October 2008 as part of their Pictures: 40 Years of Hits Tour 2008.

Other famous bands that have performed at the Victoria Theatre include The Beatles, The Jackson 5, Kasabian and The Human League.

In 2005, Steve Harley played the theatre as part of the September-December 2005 'The Quality of Mercy a Live 05' tour, promoting the new album 'The Quality Of Mercy' by Harley's band, Steve Harley and Cockney Rebel. The album is significant because it is the first album in 29 years (since 1976's 'Love's A Prima Donna') to be credited as by Steve Harley and Cockney Rebel, as opposed to just Steve Harley. The show at the Victoria Theatre on 24 September 2005 was the opening night of this tour.

In 2006, the theatre hosted a number of famous acts, including Embrace, with tickets selling out in just four hours following the success of their 2006 FIFA World Cup anthem "World at Your Feet", and Morrissey, whose tickets sold out even faster. Elkie Brooks, Jo Brand, an adaptation of Rudyard Kipling's The Jungle Book, the Chuckle Brothers and illusionist Derren Brown.

On 3 October 2007, Ian Brown played at the theatre to a sell-out crowd.

On 14 April 2012, the Victoria Theatre played host to a special production of Titanic performed by the Halifax Amateur Operatic Society. To mark the centennial of the sinking of the ship, the final performance of the run began at 11.40 p.m. – 100 years to the minute the Titanic hit the iceberg.

Westlife lead vocalist Shane Filan played at the theatre as a solo artist in 2017.

== Pantomime ==
The annual pantomime is a big event for the theatre, produced by Coventry-based production company Imagine Theatre and written by the creative team behind The Tweenies. Recent pantomimes include Snow White, Peter Pan, Cinderella, Sleeping Beauty, Aladdin and Beauty and the Beast. Since 2009 the pantomimes have been headlined by actor, Neil Hurst. who has gone on to achieve notability in Halifax, West Yorkshire due to his involvement with these shows. On 28 February 2019, Hurst announced his departure from the Victoria Theatre pantomime after 10 years and almost 1,000 performances on that stage.

As of November 2019, the theatre announced they would be putting a ban on plastic toys at their Christmas pantomimes. "Theatre bosses say they have made the move due to both environmental concerns over single-use plastics and complaints that flashing toys can distract performers while they are on stage."

== Renovations ==
Calderdale Council invested in the theatre, performing major improvements to the theatre building, including new toilets and cloakrooms, rewiring and adding a VIP suite. The council also outfitted the stalls with new seats at a cost of £335,000.

According to theatre manager Tim Fagan, the work was performed over a ten-year period and, once the programme was completed the theatre received positive comments from the acts appearing on stage. The management team hope to stage some Agatha Christie adaptations, as well as possibly inviting the National Theatre Company or the Royal Shakespeare Company to perform. Mr. Fagan would also like to host more rock and pop events, and to support local musicians and bands. The theatre has been designated a Grade II listed building by English Heritage.

In 2022 it became apparent from a professional consultant's report that the civic pipe organ given by Elizabeth Porter (1835-1904) to the people of Halifax in 1901 in memory of her brother, the philanthropist Samuel Porter (1823-1899) and vested in Calderdale Metropolitan Borough Council, was in need of renovation and a proposal was floated by the managers of the venue that the current policy of promoting theatrical and popular musical events rather than classical concerts, traditionally including those given by the Halifax Choral Society would be better served by abandoning and removing the organ altogether. This proposal is now (2024) becoming highly controversial and a campaign is beginning to save and restore the instrument in its historic home.

== See also ==
- Listed buildings in Halifax, West Yorkshire
