= Mark J. Coyle =

American political consultant

Mark J. Coyle was a political consultant in West Virginia. Coyle started as a radio reporter, but in the early 1990s he moved into public relations. In 1996, he worked for former astronaut Jon McBride, who ran unsuccessfully for governor of West Virginia, and he later played a key role in George W. Bush's 2000 victory in that state. More recently he directed media relations for the Committee to Reduce Infection Deaths, founded by Betsy McCaughey Ross. He died October 13, 2007, at age 42, in a car crash on his way to a football game at Syracuse University where he had been a student at the S. I. Newhouse School of Public Communications.
