= Reg Coyle =

Australian rules footballer

Personal information
- Full name: Reginald Francis Coyle
- Born: 1 October 1917; South Melbourne, Victoria
- Died: 26 April 1998 (aged 80); Heidelberg, Victoria
- Original team: South Melbourne City
- Debut: 1937, South Melbourne vs. Carlton, at Lake Oval
- Height: 173 cm (5 ft 8 in)
- Weight: 76 kg (168 lb)

Playing career^{1}
Years	Club	Games (Goals)
1937–1941	South Melbourne (VFL)	53 (1)
1945	South Melbourne (VFL)	9 (2)
1946	Port Melbourne (VFA)	3 (0)
- ^{1} Playing statistics correct to the end of 1946.

Reginald Francis Coyle (1 October 1917 – 26 April 1998) was an Australian rules footballer who played for South Melbourne in the Victorian Football League (VFL) in the 1930s and 1940s.

== Family ==
The son of Reginald Charles Coyle (1889–1940), and Ellen Cecilia Coyle (1885–1963), née Sullivan, Reginald Francis Coyle was born at South Melbourne, Victoria on 1 October 1917.

He married Annie Veronica Cawley (1918–1989) in 1940. They had six children.

== Football ==
=== South Melbourne (VFL) ===
Coyle was recruited from the local club South Melbourne City (he had won the competition's beat and fairest award in 1936), and made his VFL debut for South Melbourne against Carlton at the Lake Oval in Round 12 1937.

A wingman, Coyle had played 53 senior games by the end of the 1941 season, and polled votes in the 1940 and 1941 Brownlow Medal counts.

=== Second AIF ===
He enlisted in the Second AIF in 1942, and continued to play football with Army teams during his service. In Queensland, in late June/early July, he was the vice-captain, and one of the team's best players, of a combined Army team (captain Charlie Van Der Bist) that beat a combined RAAF team (captain Allan La Fontaine) 17.14 (116) to 14.11 (95).

=== South Melbourne (VFL) ===
On his discharge from the army (in 1945), he played a further nine games in the 1945 season.

=== Port Melbourne (VFA) ===
He was cleared from South Melbourne to Port Melbourne in April 1946.

== Military service ==
He enlisted in the Second AIF on 18 July 1942, and had gained the rank of Corporal by the time of his discharge on 28 March 1945.

== Death ==
He died at Heidelberg, Victoria on 26 April 1998.
