= Chris Piper =

English dancer, choreographer and producer

Chris Piper (born 15 October) is an English dancer, choreographer and producer who has worked in theatre, TV and film.

Piper was a live finalist on the premiere season of the UK version of So You Think You Can Dance and has performed at The Brit Awards, on X Factor at the Royal Variety Performance on Dancing on Ice and appeared in commercials for Marks and Spencers, Coca-Cola and BlackBerry.

Piper has also appeared in the musicals Chicago, We Will Rock You, Flashdance, Fame, Desperately Seeking Susan, Coronation Street and in the world tour of Michael Flatley's Celtic Tiger.

== Early life ==
Piper was born in October, in Bromsgrove England, before moving and growing up in Dorset.

He began studying dance at the age of 12, competing and winning many European and World titles in Disco Latin and Ballroom dancing. Piper began his musical theatre studies at the Big Little Theatre school in Bournemouth at the age of 14, and after having received numerous scholarships to different colleges continued into professional vocational training in dance and musical theatre at Bodywork Company Dance studios in Cambridge. He graduated from the college in 2005 with a National Diploma in Professional Dance and Musical Theatre.

== Career ==
Just before completing his three-year course at Bodywork, Piper beat off hundreds of auditionees to land a featured role in the world premiere cast of Celtic Tiger, opening in Madison Square Garden in New York. Piper performed featured roles in front of 100,000 people in Budapest and can be seen on the Original Cast recording of the Celtic Tiger DVD.

=== Theatre ===
After Celtic Tiger, Piper travelled to Germany in 2006 to join the cast of We Will Rock You in Cologne as Swing.

He made his West End debut in the revival of Fame in 2007 at the Shaftesbury theatre, where he understudied and played the roles of Joe Vegas, Goody and Schlomo.

Piper was assistant dance captain and swing in the world premiere cast of Desperately Seeking Susan premiering at London's Novello Theatre on 15 November 2007, following previews from 16 October 2007. Despite a star-studded opening night, the musical was criticised widely, and announced its final performance for 15 December 2007.

At the beginning of 2008 Piper rejoined We Will Rock You in Vienna for a brief contract in the original cast.

Piper was dance captain and swing in the world premiere cast of Flashdance understudying and playing the roles of Harry, Joe and Dr. Kool. The show had its world premiere in July 2008 at the Theatre Royal Plymouth, followed by a United Kingdom tour, before returning to London to appear in the West End production of Chicago at the Cambridge Theatre in 2010.

Piper's most recent West End credit is as resident choreographer in the original production of Charlie and the Chocolate Factory the Musical. The show is directed by Sam Mendes and choreographed by Peter Darling and had its world premiere at the Theatre Royal, Drury Lane in London on 25 June 2013.

Piper accepted the award for Best Choreographer at the Whatsonstage.com Awards on behalf of Peter Darling in 2014.

=== Television ===
Piper appeared on the first season of BBC 1's So You Think You Can Dance after beating thousands of people to make the top 14 and perform in the live finals, but was eliminated after performing a Samba with Hayley Newton. He also danced on Sky 1's Pineapple Dance Studios and assisted Arlene Phillips and Ashley Wallen in choreographing for the hit BBC series DanceX.

Piper has danced for Take That in appearances on the Royal Variety Performance, X Factor and the 2011 Brit Awards hosted at The O2 Arena, where the band performed the song "Kidz". Their performance of "Kidz", praised by critics, involved a highly choreographed routine featuring dancers dressed in police-styled riot gear bearing the Take That symbol on the uniform and shields.

Piper continued to support Take That and in 2011 Kim Gavin chose Piper as a dancer on the Progress Live Tour, starting in Sunderland on 27 May, and finishing with a record breaking 8 nights at London's Wembley Stadium in July 2011. Take That's Progress Live also broke all records for ticket sales selling over 1.1 million tickets in one day, smashing the previous box office record set by Take That's Circus tour in 2008.

On 29 April 2011, it was announced that Take That had recorded the official single for the upcoming blockbuster, X-Men: First Class. The song, entitled "Love Love", was released worldwide for digital download on 11 May 2011. Piper appeared in the music video for "Love Love" and danced for the first performance of the song on 11 May live on ITV for the National Movie Awards 2011.

Piper was lead dancer in the "Dance-Sing Academy" DVD's. He has appeared on "BBC Sports Academy" with Kevin Adams from "Fame Academy", "The Dame Edna Treatment" on ITV, supported Enrique Iglesias at the Astoria and in television commercials for Marks and Spencers, Coca-Cola, Blackberry, Very.co.uk and Corona.

In 2012, Piper was to work with Kim Gavin again after being selected to dance in the closing ceremonies for the 2012 London Olympics and the 2012 London Paralympics.

=== Film ===
Piper was a dancer in the film Sylvia with Gwyneth Paltrow and Daniel Craig and with Robert Pattinson and Christina Ricci in the 2012 feature film Bel Ami.
