= Richard Coyle (pirate) =

English pirate

Richard Coyle (died 1738) was an English pirate active in the Mediterranean Sea. He is known for a single incident involving the murder of the Captain of the ship St. John.

== History ==
Coyle was first mate aboard the St. John, a fish-hauler pink under Captain Benjamin Hartley. At Ancona, they took aboard American John Richardson as their new ship’s carpenter. Richardson had been a thief, con man, and womanizer. Together they conspired to take over the ship, and off Turkey they staged a mutiny. They attacked Hartley with an axe, a blunderbuss, and even a feed trough, chasing him across the deck and through the rigging. Finally, they threw him overboard where he clung to a rope until they hit him with an axe, causing him to fall into the sea and drown.

Coyle was elected captain of the St. John but was rebuffed by the crew when he proposed sailing for Malta. Instead they sailed for Menorca before foul weather forced them to the Spanish island of Foviniano. They lacked the proper paperwork to dock and were refused entry. Two boys on the ship took a boat to shore and informed the authorities, who sent out troops to apprehend Coyle and crew. Richardson and Coyle set sail before the troops arrived.

They headed for Tunis, where Richardson was arrested. He told the governor a story of being lost at sea; the governor believed him, put him up in a house, and gave him some money. Richardson shared the money with Coyle, who got drunk and let slip the truth of their piracy. Coyle was arrested and sent to Marshalsea prison in London. Richardson escaped, using cover stories to make his way to Sicily. There he was recognized by a captain who’d lived at Ancona and arrested. Talking his way out of prison, he traveled to Italy and signed aboard a ship; the ship’s captain knew he was a wanted man and had him arrested.

Richardson was tried and convicted for Hartley’s murder and was executed. While awaiting his sentence he learned that Coyle had also been convicted and had been hanged some months earlier. Coyle had tried to paint himself as an innocent man, victim of accidents and circumstances, but testimony from several other crewmen sealed his fate.

== See also ==
- Old Bailey and Admiralty Court – Coyle was tried twice, once in Admiralty Court for stealing the St. John, and once in criminal court at the Old Bailey for Hartley’s murder.
