= Trisha Ward =

English composer

- Born: 29 December 1972 (age 53); Cleveland, England
- Occupations: Writer, composer, playwright

Trisha Ward (born 29 December 1972, Cleveland, England) is an English composer and lyricist, best known for writing stage musicals. She started performing in a band and writing songs when she was fourteen years old. This led to her career in the theatre.

At the age of 23 Ward moved to London, and was signed by Warner-Chappell music publishing. She wrote a musical based upon the passion of Christ, Behold The Man, which was made into a film and screened across the ITV television network. She also wrote the critically lauded Nightshriek – for which she won the Time Out Critics Award at the age of 16.

In 2005, Ward composed the music, lyrics and book for a stage production/adaptation of Sleeping Beauty. The musical premièred at Dublin's Gaiety Theatre in May 2008.

Her most recent project has been writing lyrics and music for the Coronation Street album, Rogues, Angels, Heroes and Fools.

She now lives in London, and is signed to Sony/ATV Music Publishing.
