= Craig Coyle =

Scottish footballer

Personal information
- Date of birth: 6 September 1980 (age 46)
- Place of birth: Edinburgh, Scotland
- Height: 5 ft 10 in (1.78 m)
- Position: Goalkeeper

Youth career
- –1999: Salvesen B.C.

Senior career*
Years	Team	Apps	(Gls)
1999–2001	Raith Rovers	6	(0)
2001–2005	Greenock Morton	119	(0)
2005	Arbroath	5	(0)
2005–2006	Berwick Rangers	13	(0)
2006–2009	Bonnyrigg Rose Athletic	0	(0)
2009–2010	Linlithgow Rose	0	(0)
2010–2011	Penicuik Athletic	0	(0)
2014	Hamilton Academical	0	(0)
2016–2017	Penicuik Athletic	0	(0)
- * Club domestic league appearances and goals

Craig Coyle (born 6 September 1980) is a Scottish former footballer that played as a goalkeeper in the Scottish Football League for Raith Rovers, Greenock Morton, Arbroath, Berwick Rangers and is goalkeeper coach since 2012 at Hamilton Academical.

== Career ==
Coyle started his career at Raith Rovers playing seven times for the club. In August 2001, he signed for Greenock Morton.

In March 2005, Coyle was released by Morton and signed for Arbroath until the end of the 2004–05 season. At the end of the season he joined Third Division club Berwick Rangers.

After leaving Berwick in 2006, Coyle joined the junior ranks moving to Bonnyrigg Rose Athletic in the town of Bonnyrigg in Midlothian, where he won the Scottish Junior Football East Region Super League in the 2008–09 season.

He then signed for Linlithgow Rose after leaving Bonnyrigg, but decided to retire at the end of 2009.

Coyle recently achieved his Goalkeeping Licence Diploma from the SFA.

He is now the goalkeeper coach at Hamilton Academical and was registered as a player in April 2014 as emergency cover for Kevin Cuthbert and Blair Currie.

Recently played for a Hearts Select Team against a Rangers Select Team in the Costa Del Sol which resulted in an embarrassing defeat for the Hearts Team.
