= Coyle, Washington =

Unincorporated community in Washington, United States

- Unincorporated community
- Location within Washington (state) Location within the United States
- Coordinates: 47°41′52″N 122°48′20″W
- Country: United States
- State: Washington
- County: Jefferson
- Elevation: 141 ft (43 m)
- Time zone: UTC-8 (Pacific (PST))
  - Summer (DST): UTC-7 (PDT)
- Area code(s): 360, 564
- GNIS feature ID: 1518239

Coyle is an unincorporated community in Jefferson County, in the U.S. state of Washington. It is located at the southern tip of the Toandos Peninsula and is 14 miles from the nearest gas and grocery store in Quilcene, Washington.

== History ==
A post office called Coyle was established in 1908, and remained in operation until 1928. The community was named after George Coyle, an early settler.
