= Rachael Wooding =

English stage actress and singer

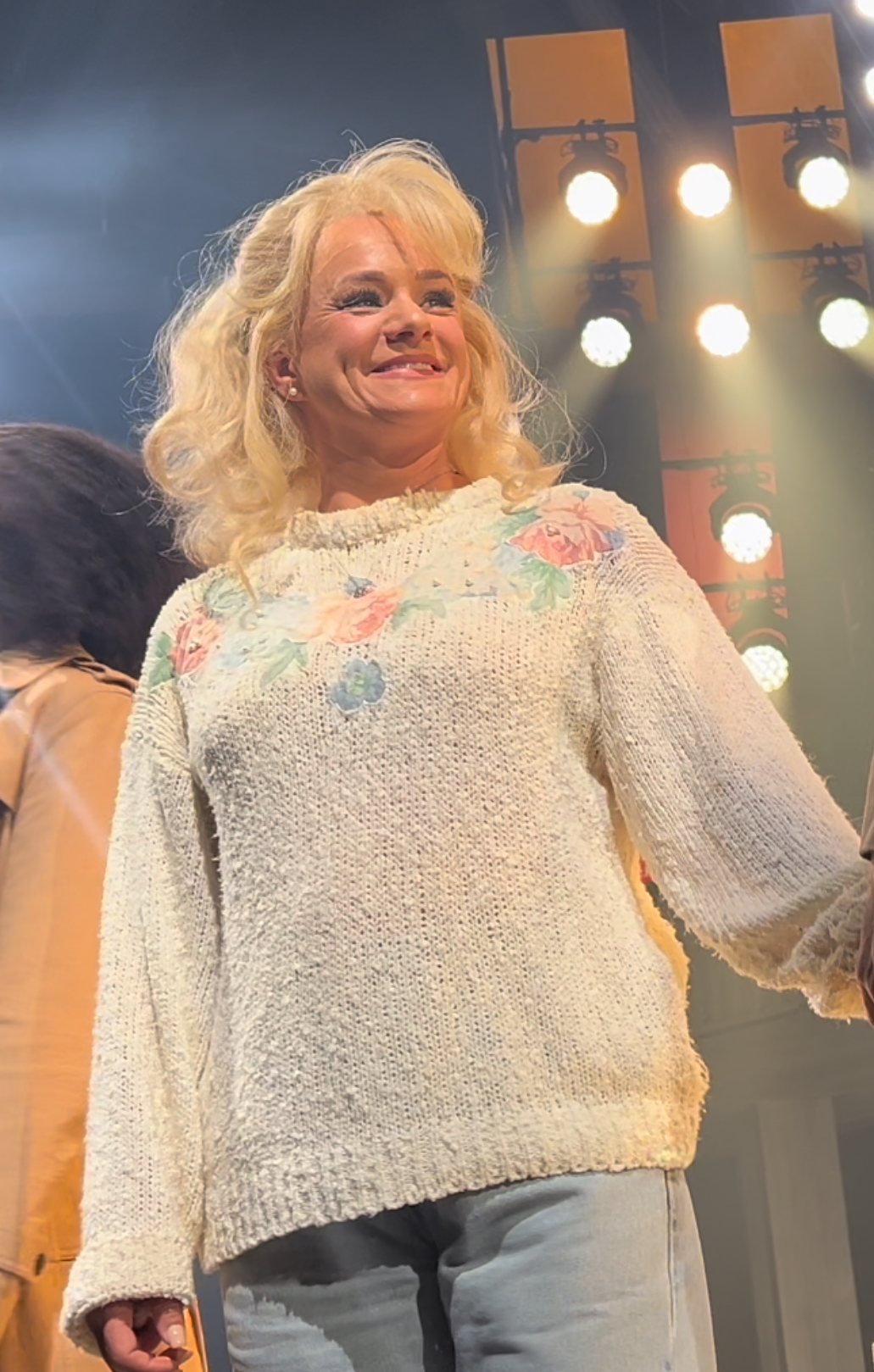
- Born: Rachael Wooding; 27 September 1978 (age 47); Doncaster, South Yorkshire, England
- Occupations: Actress, Singer, Dancer
- Spouse: George Maguire (m. July 2022)
- Children: 1

Rachael Emma Wooding (born 27 September 1978) is an Olivier Award winning English born musical theatre performer, best known for her performances in We Will Rock You, playing Meat and Scaramouche. She began her career in musicals in Germany – such as Cats and Starlight Express. After West End success in Saturday Night Fever and Fame, she went on to play Amber in the original London cast of Hairspray the Musical. Wooding left Hairspray in October 2008. She then performed the title role in Evita the Musical on the UK tour.

From March 2011, she featured as Mary Delgado in the West End production of Jersey Boys, before leaving the cast after a year to concentrate on other projects; sometimes as a singer in function band Bloomfield Avenue. In October 2012 she returned to We Will Rock You to play principal Scaramouche alongside Oliver Tompsett as Galileo.

== Career ==
Wooding is a 5' 4" mezzo-soprano. Wooding trained at the Bird College of performing arts, and has been in musicals from a young age. She appeared on Britain's Got Talent in 2016. For her audition, she sang "With You" from Ghost the Musical and in the semi-final she sang "Gravity". Her semi-final performance led her to receiving fourth in the public vote and ultimately, being eliminated from the competition.

Her TV roles include:

- Coronation Street, 2008 (as Beautician) and 2011 (as Mandy)
- Doctors, 2015 (as Shawna Roper)
- Girlfriends, 2018 (as Desk Air Steward)

Her Musical Theatre roles include:

Title	Role	Notes
Peter Pan	Mermaid	Qdos Entertainment
Fat Friends The Musical	Joanne / Pippa	U.K. Tour
Spirit of the Dance	Spirit	U.S. Tour
Cats	Demeter/Bombalurina/Rumpleteazer	Hamburg
Starlight Express	Pearl the Observation Car	Germany
Fame	Serena	West End
Footloose	Ariel	UK Tour
Loveshack	AJ	UK Tour
Saturday Night Fever	Annette	West End
We Will Rock You	Meat	West End
Hairspray	Amber Von Tussle	West End
Evita	Eva Perón	UK tour
Bright Lights, Big City	Amanda	London
Jersey Boys	Mary Delgado	West End
We Will Rock You	Scaramouche, Meat	West End
Street Of Dreams	Rita Fairclough and Ida Barlow	Manchester
Wonderland (musical)	Alice	UK Tour
Well-Behaved Women	Mary Magdalene	London
Another Night Before Christmas	Karol	Bridge House Theatre
Pretty Woman: The Musical	Kit De Luca	Piccadilly Theatre, Savoy Theatre
Standing at the Sky's Edge	Rose	Sheffield, National Theatre, Gillian Lynne Theatre
