= Murder of George Campbell =

1872 murder in Canada

- George and Phoebe Campbell
- Location: Thorndale, Ontario, Canada
- Date: July 15, 1871
- Weapon: Axe
- Victim: George Campbell
- Perpetrator: Phoebe Campbell
- Accused: 2
- Convictions: Murder
- Convicted: 1

Phoebe McWain Campbell (c. 1847 – 20 June 1872) was a Canadian woman who was hanged for the murder of her husband.

== Murder ==
Campbell had alleged that on the morning of July 15, 1871, in Thorndale, Middlesex County, Ontario, two men who had darkened their faces broke into George and Phoebe's log cabin home and hacked George to death with an axe because he refused to hand over some money. They had attempted to use a gun which misfired.

== Investigation and trial ==
During the investigation, six local men were arrested, including Thomas Coyle, who was George's farmhand. Doubt about Phoebe's innocence arose rapidly as she was seen talking with Coyle; she also seemed to have done nothing to help save her husband as he was being murdered and seemed very unemotional following George's funeral. A coroner's autopsy concluded that George was murdered by Phoebe and Coyle. "I don't care. I'm innocent and I don't care", Phoebe stated. She then accused Coyle of the murder, then quickly changed her mind and accused her cousin.

Phoebe's murder trial began on 1 April 1872, with much public interest. Phoebe accused George of having an affair with her cousin's wife. During the trial, the crown prosecutor produced a letter which stated, "I never shall say you done any such thing again—if I have to die for it." When asked why she changed her testimony, she claimed the ghost of her late husband visited her and declared her and Coyle innocent. The crown prosecutor responded, "You can hardly expect anyone to believe such nonsense!"

=== Verdict ===
After the trial, the jury took just one hour to reach a guilty verdict. Phoebe then sobbed as the judge sentenced her to hanging. She later confessed that she and Coyle murdered George so they could marry. Coyle went to trial for his crime but was acquitted. He later moved to England.

She was hanged on 20 June 1872 at the age of 25, and was again said to be emotionless as she was about to be hanged, holding a lace handkerchief in her hand until after she died.

== Media attention ==
The story received so much public attention that postcards depicting the crime were made, which were bought by many.

== General references ==
- Doty, Christopher. "The Trials of Phoebe Campbell". Archived from the original on 12 February 2007.
- "Ontario Deaths Index". Ontario Vital Statistics Project.
