= Charlotte Coyle =

Northern Irish model

- Born: Derry, Northern Ireland
- Modeling information
- Height: 5 ft 11 in (1.80 m)
- Hair color: Blonde
- Eye color: Blue/Grey

Charlotte Coyle is a plus-size model from Derry, Northern Ireland.

She cites Sophie Dahl as her inspiration and has appeared in ads for Torrid and Marks & Spencer, in an editorial in the U.K. edition of Good Housekeeping magazine, and starred in a Channel 4 documentary titled Fat Beauty Contest (broadcast 10 August 2006) in which she organized Britain's first beauty contest for plus-size women and was subsequently re-broadcast on Channel One in Belgium.

She has also appeared on television on ITV's This Morning program, on the premiere episode of Russell Brand's Got Issues, and on Make Me A Supermodel Extra, and has been interviewed on BBC Radio and on the Richard & Judy daytime talk show.

Coyle was represented by the Wilhelmina agency in New York (ten20 division) and by Close Models in the U.K.
