= Munich North (electoral district) =

Member constituency used for the German parliament

216 Munich North
- Electoral district for the Bundestag
- Munich North in 2025
- State: Bavaria
- Population: 372,800 (2019)
- Electorate: 223,690 (2025)
- Major settlements: Munich (partial)
- Area: 87.8 km^{2}

Current electoral district
- Created: 1949
- Party: CSU
- Member: Hans Diogenes Theiss
- Elected: 2025

Munich North (German: München-Nord) is an electoral constituency (German: Wahlkreis) represented in the Bundestag. It elects one member via first-past-the-post voting. Under the current constituency numbering system, it is designated as constituency 216. It is located in southern Bavaria, comprising the northern part of the city of Munich.

Munich North was created for the inaugural 1949 federal election. Since 2025, it has been represented by Hans Diogenes Theiss of the Christian Social Union (CSU).

== Geography ==
Munich North is located in southern Bavaria. As of the 2021 federal election, it comprises the boroughs of Maxvorstadt (3), Schwabing-West (4), Moosach (10), Milbertshofen-Am Hart (11), Schwabing-Freimann (12), and Feldmoching-Hasenbergl (24) from the independent city of Munich.

== History ==
Munich North was created in 1949. In the 1949 election, it was Bavaria constituency 5 in the numbering system. In the 1953 through 1961 elections, it was number 200. In the 1965 through 1976 elections, it was number 205. In the 1980 through 1998 elections, it was number 204. In the 2002 and 2005 elections, it was number 219. In the 2009 and 2013 elections, it was number 218. In the 2017 and 2021 elections, it was number 217. From the 2025 election, it has been number 216.

Originally, the constituency comprised the boroughs of Schwabing, Freimann, Milbertshofen, Moosach, Feldmoching, Hasenbergl, Maxvorstadt, and Lehel. In the 1965 through 1972 elections, it comprised the boroughs of Schwabing-Ost, Freimann, Milbertshofen, Moosach, Feldmoching, Hasenbergl, and Neuhausen. In the 1976 election, it lost the Neuhausen borough. It acquired its current borders in the 2002 election.

Election	No.	Name	Borders
1949	5	München-Nord	Munich city (only Schwabing, Freimann, Milbertshofen, Moosach, Feldmoching, Hasenbergl, Maxvorstadt, and Lehel boroughs)
1953	200	München-Nord	Munich city (only Schwabing, Freimann, Milbertshofen, Moosach, Feldmoching, Hasenbergl, Maxvorstadt, and Lehel boroughs)
1957	200	München-Nord	Munich city (only Schwabing, Freimann, Milbertshofen, Moosach, Feldmoching, Hasenbergl, Maxvorstadt, and Lehel boroughs)
1961	200	München-Nord	Munich city (only Schwabing, Freimann, Milbertshofen, Moosach, Feldmoching, Hasenbergl, Maxvorstadt, and Lehel boroughs)
1965	205	München-Nord	Munich city (only Schwabing-Ost, Freimann, Milbertshofen, Moosach, Feldmoching, Hasenbergl, and Neuhausen boroughs)
1969	205	München-Nord	Munich city (only Schwabing-Ost, Freimann, Milbertshofen, Moosach, Feldmoching, Hasenbergl, and Neuhausen boroughs)
1972	205	München-Nord	Munich city (only Schwabing-Ost, Freimann, Milbertshofen, Moosach, Feldmoching, Hasenbergl, and Neuhausen boroughs)
1976	205	München-Nord	Munich city (only Schwabing-Ost, Freimann, Milbertshofen, Moosach, Feldmoching, and Hasenbergl boroughs)
1980	204	München-Nord	Munich city (only Schwabing-Ost, Freimann, Milbertshofen, Moosach, Feldmoching, and Hasenbergl boroughs)
1983	204	München-Nord	Munich city (only Schwabing-Ost, Freimann, Milbertshofen, Moosach, Feldmoching, and Hasenbergl boroughs)
1987	204	München-Nord	Munich city (only Schwabing-Ost, Freimann, Milbertshofen, Moosach, Feldmoching, and Hasenbergl boroughs)
1990	204	München-Nord	Munich city (only Schwabing-Ost, Freimann, Milbertshofen, Moosach, Feldmoching, and Hasenbergl boroughs)
1994	204	München-Nord	Munich city (only Schwabing-Ost, Freimann, Milbertshofen, Moosach, Feldmoching, and Hasenbergl boroughs)
1998	204	München-Nord	Munich city (only Schwabing-Ost, Freimann, Milbertshofen, Moosach, Feldmoching, and Hasenbergl boroughs)
2002	219	München-Nord	Munich city (only Maxvorstadt (3), Schwabing-West (4), Moosach (10), Milbertshofen-Am Hart (11), Schwabing-Freimann (12), and Feldmoching-Hasenbergl (24) boroughs)
2005	219	München-Nord	Munich city (only Maxvorstadt (3), Schwabing-West (4), Moosach (10), Milbertshofen-Am Hart (11), Schwabing-Freimann (12), and Feldmoching-Hasenbergl (24) boroughs)
2009	218	München-Nord	Munich city (only Maxvorstadt (3), Schwabing-West (4), Moosach (10), Milbertshofen-Am Hart (11), Schwabing-Freimann (12), and Feldmoching-Hasenbergl (24) boroughs)
2013	218	München-Nord	Munich city (only Maxvorstadt (3), Schwabing-West (4), Moosach (10), Milbertshofen-Am Hart (11), Schwabing-Freimann (12), and Feldmoching-Hasenbergl (24) boroughs)
2017	217	München-Nord	Munich city (only Maxvorstadt (3), Schwabing-West (4), Moosach (10), Milbertshofen-Am Hart (11), Schwabing-Freimann (12), and Feldmoching-Hasenbergl (24) boroughs)
2021	217	München-Nord	Munich city (only Maxvorstadt (3), Schwabing-West (4), Moosach (10), Milbertshofen-Am Hart (11), Schwabing-Freimann (12), and Feldmoching-Hasenbergl (24) boroughs)
2025	216	München-Nord	Munich city (only Maxvorstadt (3), Schwabing-West (4), Moosach (10), Milbertshofen-Am Hart (11), Schwabing-Freimann (12), and Feldmoching-Hasenbergl (24) boroughs)

== Members ==
The constituency was first represented by Walter Seuffert of the Social Democratic Party (SPD) from 1949 to 1953. Otto Gumrum of the Christian Social Union (CSU) was elected in 1953 and served a single term. Siegfried Balke of the CSU then served from 1957 to 1965. Former member Seuffert won the constituency in 1965 and served one term. He was succeeded by fellow SPD member Wenzel Bredl from 1969 to 1976. Former mayor of Munich Hans-Jochen Vogel of the SPD was representative from 1976 to 1983. Fritz Wittmann won the constituency for the CSU in 1983, and served until 1994. Johannes Singhammer of the CSU served one term from 1994 to 1998. Axel Berg of the SPD was elected in 1998, and was representative until 2009. Former member Singhammer of the CSU won the constituency for in 2009 and served until 2017. Bernhard Loos of the CSU served from 2017 until 2025. Hans Diogenes Theiss of the CSU retained the constituency in 2025.

Election	Member	Party	%
1949	Walter Seuffert	SPD	23.9
1953	Otto Gumrum	CSU	47.2
1957	Siegfried Balke	CSU	47.9
1961	Siegfried Balke	CSU	42.4
1965	Walter Seuffert	SPD	47.7
1969	Wenzel Bredl	SPD	51.2
1972	Wenzel Bredl	SPD	54.3
1976	Hans-Jochen Vogel	SPD	47.4
1980	Hans-Jochen Vogel	SPD	50.1
1983	Fritz Wittmann	CSU	45.8
1987	Fritz Wittmann	CSU	44.4
1990	Fritz Wittmann	CSU	38.9
1994	Johannes Singhammer	CSU	44.1
1998	Axel Berg	SPD	44.9
2002	Axel Berg	SPD	43.5
2005	Axel Berg	SPD	43.7
2009	Johannes Singhammer	CSU	36.5
2013	Johannes Singhammer	CSU	43.2
2017	Bernhard Loos	CSU	32.4
2021	Bernhard Loos	CSU	25.7
2025	Hans Diogenes Theiss	CSU	32.4

== Election results ==
=== 2025 election ===
Federal election (2025): Munich North
Notes:	Blue background denotes the winner of the electorate vote. Pink background denotes a candidate elected from their party list. Yellow background denotes an electorate win by a list member, or other incumbent. A ✓ or ✗ denotes status of any incumbent, win or lose respectively.						
Party	Candidate	Votes	%	±%	Party votes	%	±%
CSU	Hans Theiss	59,872	32.4	▲6.7	53.494	28,9	▲6.0
Greens	Frederik Ostermeier	44,697	24.2	0.0	42,281	22.8	▼2.8
SPD	Philippa Sigl-Glöckner	36,593	19.8	▼2.0	28,582	15.4	▼3.6
AfD	Christoph Rhaetian	16,685	9.0	▲4.7	17,688	9.5	▲4.8
Left	Christian Schwarzenberger	12,121	6.6	▲3.0	16,785	9.1	▲5.0
FDP	Daniel Föst	8,536	4.6	▼6.5	12,394	6.7	▼8.1
FW	Linus Springer	2,700	1.5	▼0.48	2,195	1.2	▼1.3
Volt	Marco Heumann	3,010	1.6	▲0.2	2,295	1.2	▲0.3
BD	Gerhard Hager	524	0.3		168	0.1	
dieBasis				▼1.5	402	0.1	▼1.1
APT				▼1.2	1.186	0.6	▼0.2
PARTEI				▼0.9	779	0.4	▼0.2
Pirates							▼0.3
BP				▼0.3	150	0.1	▼0.2
Humanists					169	0.1	▼0.0
ÖDP				▼1.1	563	0.3	▼0.3
MLPD				▼0.0	47	0.0	▼0.0
Unabhängige							▼0.4
BSW					6,055	3.3	
Bündnis C							0.0
Team Todenhöfer							▼0.9
Gesundheitsforschung							▼0.9
BüSo				0.0			
Informal votes		1,017			523		
Total valid votes		184,738			185,232		
Turnout		185,755	83.0	▲4.6			
CSU hold	Majority			▲4.6			

=== 2021 election ===
Federal election (2021): Munich North
Notes:	Blue background denotes the winner of the electorate vote. Pink background denotes a candidate elected from their party list. Yellow background denotes an electorate win by a list member, or other incumbent. A ✓ or ✗ denotes status of any incumbent, win or lose respectively.						
Party	Candidate	Votes	%	±%	Party votes	%	±%
CSU	✓ Bernhard Loos	44,854	25.7	▼6.6	39,986	22.9	▼5.9
Greens	Doris Wagner	42,319	24.2	▲11.1	44,861	25.6	▲8.7
SPD	Florian Post	38,172	21.9	▼4.2	33,241	19.0	▲2.3
FDP	Daniel Föst	19,477	11.2	▲1.5	25,953	14.8	▼0.3
AfD	Petr Bystron	7,591	4.3	▼3.3	8,250	4.7	▼3.9
Left	Christian Schwarzenberger	6,216	3.6	▼2.4	7,044	4.0	▼4.2
FW	Linus Springer	3,969	2.3	▲0.7	4,396	2.5	▲1.4
dieBasis	Andreas Sönnichsen	2,540	1.5		2,216	1.3	
Team Todenhöfer					1,603	0.9	
Volt	Julia Amtmann	2,410	1.4		1,555	0.9	
Tierschutzpartei	Thomas Kreidemeier	2,072	1.2		1,504	0.9	▲0.1
ÖDP	Beate Merkel	1,862	1.1	▼0.6	1,143	0.7	▼0.2
PARTEI	Philipp Rückel	1,562	0.9	▼0.4	1,157	0.7	▼0.3
Pirates					488	0.3	▼0.2
BP	Maximilian Langenecker	563	0.3	▼0.4	409	0.2	▼0.3
Humanists					218	0.1	
du.	Achim Seger	402	0.2		139	0.1	
V-Partei3	Andreas Naumann	324	0.2		184	0.1	▼0.1
Independent	Karl Hilz	237	0.1				
Unabhängige					175	0.1	
Gesundheitsforschung					141	0.1	0.0
Bündnis C					60	0.0	
LKR					50	0.0	
DKP					36	0.0	0.0
MLPD	Birgit Schiel-Zollner	60	0.0	▼0.1	35	0.0	0.0
BüSo	Martin Hennig	41	0.0	0.0			
NPD					30	0.0	▼0.1
The III. Path					28	0.0	
Informal votes		880			649		
Total valid votes		174,671			174,902		
Turnout		175,551	78.5	▲1.6			
CSU hold	Majority	2,535	1.5	▼4.8			

=== 2017 election ===
Federal election (2017): Munich North
Notes:	Blue background denotes the winner of the electorate vote. Pink background denotes a candidate elected from their party list. Yellow background denotes an electorate win by a list member, or other incumbent. A ✓ or ✗ denotes status of any incumbent, win or lose respectively.						
Party	Candidate	Votes	%	±%	Party votes	%	±%
CSU	Bernhard Loos	55,811	32.2	▼11.0	49,953	28.8	▼8.0
SPD	Florian Post	45,068	26.0	▼5.4	28,903	16.7	▼8.0
Greens	Doris Wagner	22,726	13.1	▲2.8	29,334	16.9	▲3.3
FDP	Daniel Föst	16,669	9.6	▲5.9	26,241	15.1	▲6.9
AfD	Petr Bystron	13,216	7.6		14,982	8.6	▲4.1
Left	Ates Gürpinar	10,351	6.0	▲2.3	14,302	8.2	▲3.7
ÖDP	Tobias Ruff	2,893	1.7	▲0.2	1,419	0.8	▼0.2
FW	Horst Engler-Hamm	2,752	1.6	▼0.3	1,869	1.1	▼0.3
PARTEI	Valentin Schwarze	2,188	1.3		1,590	0.9	
Tierschutzpartei					1,354	0.8	▲0.1
BP	Stephan Mannseicher	1,168	0.7		874	0.5	▼0.1
Pirates					750	0.4	▼2.3
DiB					541	0.3	
BGE					360	0.2	
V-Partei³					324	0.2	
DM					266	0.2	
Gesundheitsforschung					174	0.1	
NPD					135	0.1	▼0.3
MLPD	Patrick Ziegler	160	0.1	0.0	79	0.0	0.0
DKP					40	0.0	
BüSo	Martin Henning	119	0.1	▼0.1	38	0.0	0.0
Informal votes		1,075			668		
Total valid votes		173,121			173,528		
Turnout		174,196	76.9	▲7.8			
CSU hold	Majority	10,743	6.2	▼5.6			

=== 2013 election ===
Federal election (2013): Munich North
Notes:	Blue background denotes the winner of the electorate vote. Pink background denotes a candidate elected from their party list. Yellow background denotes an electorate win by a list member, or other incumbent. A ✓ or ✗ denotes status of any incumbent, win or lose respectively.						
Party	Candidate	Votes	%	±%	Party votes	%	±%
CSU	✓ Johannes Singhammer	66,930	43.2	▲6.7	57,100	36.8	▲5.8
SPD	Florian Post	48,625	31.4	▼4.1	38,350	24.7	▲4.9
Greens	Doris Wagner	15,962	10.3	▲0.5	21,174	13.6	▼3.8
FDP	Ruth Hohenadl	5,749	3.7	▼6.4	12,778	8.2	▼9.7
AfD					7,106	4.6	
Left	Roland Stigge	5,722	3.7	▼1.3	7,088	4.6	▼2.3
Pirates	Alexander Bock	4,979	3.2		4,223	2.7	▲0.1
FW	Gökhan Deger	2,936	1.9		2,193	1.4	
ÖDP	Michael Sandweg	2,320	1.5	▲0.4	1,544	1.0	▲0.2
NPD	Detlef Wacker	1,142	0.7	▼0.2	654	0.4	▼0.3
Tierschutzpartei					1,071	0.7	0.0
BP					900	0.6	▲0.1
REP					262	0.2	▼0.1
DIE VIOLETTEN					209	0.1	▼0.1
DIE FRAUEN					196	0.1	
Party of Reason					128	0.1	
PRO					110	0.1	
BüSo	Martin Hennig	228	0.1	0.0	56	0.0	0.0
MLPD	Klaus Dumberger	164	0.1	0.0	60	0.0	0.0
RRP					42	0.0	▼0.6
Informal votes		1,185			698		
Total valid votes		154,757			155,244		
Turnout		155,942	69.1	▼2.4			
CSU hold	Majority	18,305	11.8	▲10.9			

=== 2009 election ===
Federal election (2009): Munich North
Notes:	Blue background denotes the winner of the electorate vote. Pink background denotes a candidate elected from their party list. Yellow background denotes an electorate win by a list member, or other incumbent. A ✓ or ✗ denotes status of any incumbent, win or lose respectively.						
Party	Candidate	Votes	%	±%	Party votes	%	±%
CSU	Johannes Singhammer	57,161	36.5	▼4.5	48,622	31.0	▼5.2
SPD	✗ Axel Berg	55,691	35.6	▼8.2	31,067	19.8	▼10.1
FDP	Ruth Hohenadl	15,766	10.1	▲5.2	28,189	18.0	▲5.9
Greens	Judith Greif	15,307	9.8	▲4.2	27,405	17.5	▲2.6
Left	Nicole Fritsche	7,773	5.0	▲2.3	10,705	6.8	▲2.8
Pirates					4,164	2.7	
Independent	Herbert Utz	1,285	0.8				
ÖDP	Leo Meyer-Giesow	1,732	1.1		1,283	0.8	
NPD	Heinz Rudolf	1,531	1.0	▲0.1	1,117	0.7	0.0
Tierschutzpartei					1,019	0.6	
RRP					932	0.6	
BP					751	0.5	▲0.1
REP					482	0.3	▼0.1
FAMILIE					461	0.3	▼0.2
DIE VIOLETTEN					306	0.2	
PBC					96	0.1	▼0.1
BüSo	David Faku	217	0.1	0.0	95	0.1	0.0
CM					85	0.1	
DVU					73	0.0	
MLPD	Klaus Dumberger	123	0.1		70	0.0	0.0
Informal votes		1,459			1,123		
Total valid votes		156,586			156,922		
Turnout		158,045	71.6	▼3.5			
CSU gain from SPD	Majority	1,470	0.9				

=== 2005 election ===
Federal election (2005):Munich North
Notes:	Blue background denotes the winner of the electorate vote. Pink background denotes a candidate elected from their party list. Yellow background denotes an electorate win by a list member, or other incumbent. A ✓ or ✗ denotes status of any incumbent, win or lose respectively.						
Party	Candidate	Votes	%	±%	Party votes	%	±%
SPD	✓ Axel Berg	65,893	43.7	▲0.2	45,157	29.9	▼0.8
CSU	Johannes Singhammer	61,739	41.0	▼2.3	54,704	36.2	▼7.2
Greens	Stefan Boes	8,337	5.5	▼1.5	22,367	14.8	▼1.5
FDP	Daniel Volk	7,272	4.8	▲0.6	18,274	12.1	▲5.9
Left	Fiedrich Schmalzbauer	3,959	2.6	▲1.7	6,082	4.0	▲2.7
NPD	Roland Wuttke	1,334	0.9		1,134	0.8	▲0.6
Familie	Heidrun Schall	1,207	0.8		717	0.5	
BP	Jaroslav Curlisca	716	0.5		614	0.4	▲0.3
REP					631	0.4	0.0
GRAUEN					630	0.4	▲0.3
Feminist					285	0.2	▲0.1
BüSo	Klaus Fimmen	260	0.2	0.0	135	0.1	0.0
PBC					171	0.1	▲0.1
MLPD					77	0.1	
Informal votes		1,545			1,284		
Total valid votes		150,717			150,704		
Turnout		152,262	75.1	▼3.4			
SPD hold	Majority	4,154	2.7				
