= Kevin Kühnert =

German politician (born 1989)

- Kühnert in 2021

General Secretary of the Social Democratic Party
- In office 11 December 2021 – 7 October 2024
- Leader: Saskia Esken; Lars Klingbeil
- Preceded by: Lars Klingbeil
- Succeeded by: Matthias Miersch

Deputy Leader of the Social Democratic Party
- In office 6 December 2019 – 11 December 2021 Serving with Serpil Midyatli, Anke Rehlinger, Klara Geywitz, Hubertus Heil
- Leader: Saskia Esken; Norbert Walter-Borjans
- Preceded by: Olaf Scholz
- Succeeded by: Thomas Kutschaty

Chairman of the Jusos
- In office 24 November 2017 – 8 January 2021
- Preceded by: Johanna Uekermann
- Succeeded by: Jessica Rosenthal

Member of the Bundestag; for Berlin-Tempelhof-Schöneberg
- In office 26 October 2021 – 25 March 2025
- Preceded by: Jan-Marco Luczak
- Succeeded by: Moritz Heuberger

Personal details
- Born: 1 July 1989 (age 37) West Berlin, West Germany
- Party: Social Democratic
- Education: Beethoven-Gymnasium; Free University of Berlin (no degree)
- Website: Party website

Kevin Kühnert (born 1 July 1989) is a German politician of Social Democratic Party (SPD) who served as member of the Bundestag from 2021 to 2025, representing Berlin-Tempelhof-Schöneberg. He was General Secretary of the SPD from December 2021 to October 2024. From November 2017 to January 2021, Kühnert was the federal chairman of the Jusos (the youth organization of the SPD), previously serving as deputy chairman.

== Early life and career ==
Kühnert was born in West Berlin. His father works as a tax clerk while his mother is employed in a job centre. He passed his final exam at the Beethoven-Gymnasium in Lankwitz in 2008, where he also served as pupil's spokesman. He then completed a voluntary social year (German: Freiwilliges Soziales Jahr) in a Berlin-based organization for children and young people.

Kühnert initially worked over three years as a call center agent. Later, he started studying journalism and communication science at the Free University of Berlin, but failed to graduate. In 2016, he enrolled for a degree in political science at the University of Hagen, but suspended studies after becoming Juso chairman. In 2014, he began working in the Abgeordnetenhaus of Berlin, first for Dilek Kolat, then Melanie Kühnemann.

== Political career ==
=== Early beginnings ===
Kühnert joined the SPD in 2005 and chaired the Jusos in Berlin from 2012 to 2015. Since 2015, he acted as deputy Jusos Federal Chairman and was responsible for tax policy, pension policy, structural policy, right-wing extremism, and migration policy, as well as social media work.

=== Chair of the Young Socialists (2017–2021) ===
When Johanna Uekermann did not run as a candidate again, in November 2017, the Juso federal congress in Saarbrücken elected Kühnert as chairman, with 225 of 297 votes. In terms of local politics, Kühnert is active in the district of Tempelhof-Schöneberg as a member of the district council.

During the campaign for the SPD party member vote on the 2018 coalition agreement of Germany, Kühnert, along with the #NoGroKo (No Grand Coalition) initiative, promoted the No campaign. At a SPD national convention in 2019, he was elected as one of the five deputies of the party's co-chairs Saskia Esken and Norbert Walter-Borjans, alongside Klara Geywitz, Hubertus Heil, Serpil Midyatli and Anke Rehlinger. He had previously endorsed Esken and Walter-Borjans in their successful bid for the leadership of the party in 2019.

In an August 2020 interview with Der Tagesspiegel Kühnert announced that he would step down as chair of the Jusos, saying that the "time was right" for new leadership in advance of an anticipated 2021 German federal election. After Kühnert resigned from the office early because of his candidacy for the Bundestag, Jessica Rosenthal was elected to succeed him on 8 January 2021, with 207 of 266 votes.

=== Member of the German Parliament (2021–2025) ===
On 16 December 2020, Kühnert was nominated as a direct candidate in the Berlin constituency of Tempelhof-Schöneberg in the 2021 federal election.

In the negotiations to form a so-called traffic light coalition of the SPD, the Green Party and the FDP following the 2021 federal elections, Kühnert led his party's delegation in the working group on housing and construction; his co-chairs from the other parties were Christian Kühn and Daniel Föst.

=== Secretary General of the SPD (2021–2024) ===
In 2021 Kühnert was elected secretary general of the SPD. He was reelected at the party's congress in 2023 with 92% of the vote. On 7 October 2024 Kühnert stepped down as secretary general due to health issues, and announced he would not run again for the Bundestag on 23 February 2025.

== Other activities ==
- spw – Zeitschrift für sozialistische Politik und Wirtschaft, Member of the Editorial Board
- Education and Science Workers' Union (GEW), member
- Willy Brandt Center Jerusalem (WBC), member
- German Youth Hostel Association (DJH), member
- Tennis Borussia Berlin, Member of the supervisory board (2013–2017)

== Political positions ==
=== Economic policy ===
In an interview with German newspaper Die Zeit in May 2019, Kühnert described himself as being a democratic socialist, promoting the municipalization of large firms and the expropriation of owners from companies like BMW and people who own more than one house or apartment. In his opinion, real democratic socialism has never been tried.

=== Foreign policy ===
In early 2022 – amid the run-up to the Russian invasion of Ukraine and anti-government protests in Kazakhstan – Kühnert argued that the Nord Stream 2 pipeline to bring Russian gas to Germany should not be mixed up with political and human rights disputes with Russia.

== Recognition ==
In May 2018, Kühnert was chosen as a "Next Generation Leader" by Time because of the resistance he launched against the grand coalition that nearly managed to topple Chancellor Angela Merkel and led to a national debate about the future of the SPD and the future of German politics in general. In August 2020 he was described as "a rising star on the left" in Germany by The Guardian.

== Personal life ==
In March 2018, Kühnert came out as gay in an interview with the magazine Siegessäule. "I know that, especially in some villages, even in 2022, some people will still be kicked out by their parents if they reveal their sexual orientation... These young people need role models." he said in 2022, when he spoke about his same-sex partner.
