= Axel Berg (politician) =

German politician (born 1959)

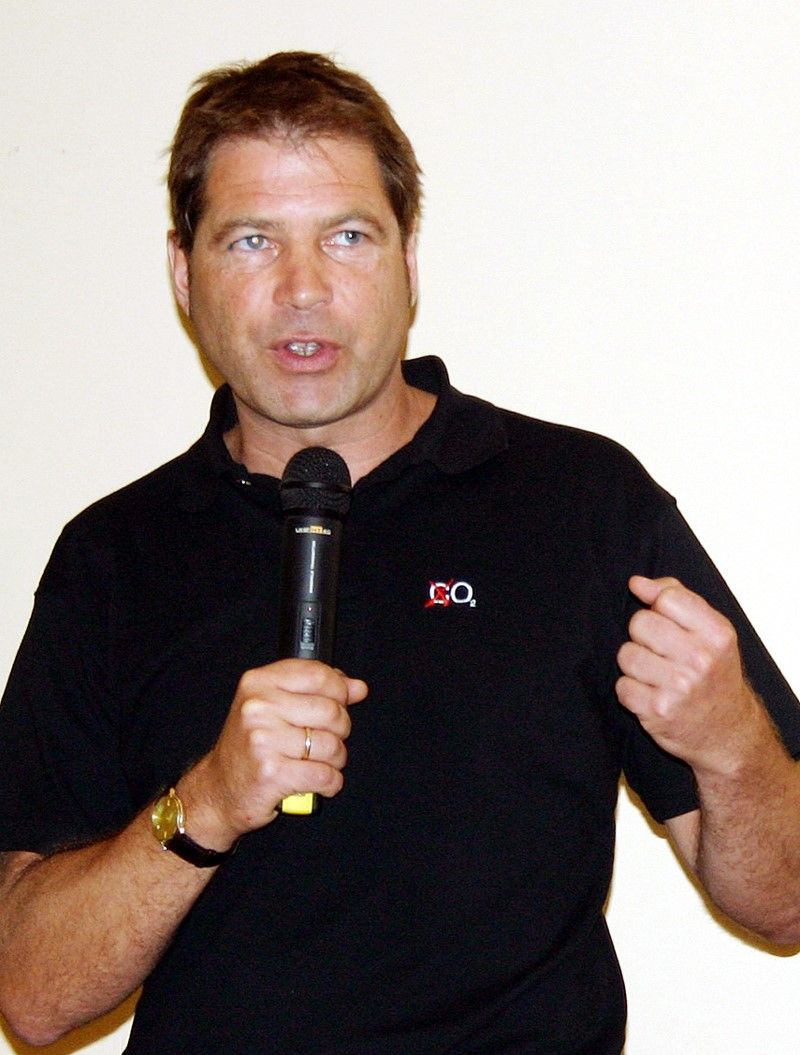
- Berg in 2005

Member of the Bundestag; for Munich North
- In office 26 October 1998 – 27 October 2009
- Preceded by: Johannes Singhammer
- Succeeded by: Johannes Singhammer

Personal details
- Born: 26 March 1959 (age 67) Stuttgart, West Germany
- Party: Social Democratic
- Education: LMU Munich; University of Tübingen; Aix-Marseille University

Dr. Axel Berg (born 26 March 1959) is a German politician and member of the SPD.

Berg, MdB for Munich-North, was the only directly elected member of the Bavarian SPD member in the Bundestag until his defeat at the 2009 German federal election. He was a member of the Bundestag from 1998 to 2009.
