= Berlin-Tempelhof-Schöneberg =

Federal electoral district in Berlin

80 Berlin-Tempelhof-Schöneberg
- Electoral district for the Bundestag
- Berlin-Tempelhof-Schöneberg in 2025
- State: Berlin
- Population: 343,600 (2019)
- Electorate: 231,500 (2021)
- Area: 53.1 km^{2}

Current electoral district
- Created: 2002
- Party: Alliance 90/The Greens
- Member: Moritz Heuberger
- Elected: 2025

Berlin-Tempelhof-Schöneberg is an electoral constituency (German: Wahlkreis) represented in the Bundestag. It elects one member via first-past-the-post voting. Under the current constituency numbering system, it is designated as constituency 80. It is located in southern Berlin, comprising the Tempelhof-Schöneberg borough.

Berlin-Tempelhof-Schöneberg was created for the 2002 federal election. Since 2025, it has been represented by Moritz Heuberger of Alliance 90/The Greens.

== Geography ==
Berlin-Tempelhof-Schöneberg is located in southern Berlin. As of the 2021 federal election, it is coterminous with the Tempelhof-Schöneberg borough.

== History ==
Berlin-Tempelhof-Schöneberg was created in 2002, replacing the abolished constituency of Berlin-Tempelhof and containing parts of the abolished Berlin-Kreuzberg-Schöneberg constituency. In the 2002 through 2009 elections, it was constituency 82 in the numbering system. In the 2013 through 2021 elections, it was number 81. From the 2025 election, it has been number 80. Its borders have not changed since its creation.

== Members ==
The constituency was first represented by Eckhardt Barthel of the Social Democratic Party (SPD) in from 2002 to 2005, followed by Mechthild Rawert until 2009. Jan-Marco Luczak of the Christian Democratic Union (CDU) was elected in 2009, and re-elected in 2013 and 2017. Former Jusos chairman Kevin Kühnert won the constituency for the SPD in 2021. Moritz Heuberger of the Alliance 90/The Greens was elected in 2025.

| Election | Member | Party | % |
|---|---|---|---|
| 2002 | Eckhardt Barthel | SPD | 35.7 |
| 2005 | Mechthild Rawert | SPD | 34.2 |
| 2009 | Jan-Marco Luczak | CDU | 32.5 |
| 2013 | Jan-Marco Luczak | CDU | 35.0 |
| 2017 | Jan-Marco Luczak | CDU | 28.9 |
| 2021 | Kevin Kühnert | SPD | 27.1 |
| 2025 | Moritz Heuberger | GRÜNE | 24.7 |

== Election results ==
=== 2025 election ===
Federal election (2025): Berlin-Tempelhof-Schöneberg
| Notes: | Blue background denotes the winner of the electorate vote. Pink background denotes a candidate elected from their party list. Yellow background denotes an electorate win by a list member, or other incumbent. A ✓ or ✗ denotes status of any incumbent, win or lose respectively. | | | | | | |
| Party | Candidate | Votes | % | ±% | Party votes | % | ±% |
|---|---|---|---|---|---|---|---|
| Greens | Moritz Heuberger | 45,639 | 24.7 | ▼0.5 | 36,909 | 19.9 | ▼5.4 |
| CDU | Jan-Marco Luczak | 45,573 | 24.6 | ▲2.3 | 38,864 | 20.9 | ▲2.2 |
| SPD | Sinem Tasan-Funke | 37,934 | 20.5 | ▼6.2 | 32,850 | 17.7 | ▼6.6 |
| Left | Stanislav Jurk | 22,399 | 12.1 | ▲6.1 | 32,120 | 17.3 | ▲9.8 |
| AfD | Frank-Christian Hansel | 20,626 | 11.1 | ▲5.2 | 20,986 | 11.3 | ▲4.9 |
| BSW | | | | | 9,521 | 5.1 | New |
| FDP | Axel Bering | 4,986 | 2.7 | ▼4.4 | 7,145 | 3.8 | ▼5.4 |
| Tierschutzpartei | Nico Poschinski | 4,467 | 2.4 | 0.0 | 2,615 | 1.4 | ▼0.8 |
| Volt | | | | | 1,613 | 0.9 | ▲0.2 |
| PARTEI | | | | | 1,011 | 0.5 | ▼0.6 |
| Team Todenhöfer | Ahmad Iskander | 1,810 | 1.0 | New | 609 | 0.3 | ▼1.1 |
| Independent | Franziska Thomas | 819 | 0.4 | New | | | |
| FW | | | | | 458 | 0.2 | ▼0.6 |
| PdF | | | | | 289 | 0.2 | New |
| BD | Christian Lieberam | 532 | 0.3 | New | 251 | 0.1 | New |
| MERA25 | | | | | 246 | 0.1 | New |
| BüSo | Klaus Fimmen | 233 | 0.1 | New | 93 | 0.1 | 0.0 |
| MLPD | | | | | 61 | 0.0 | 0.0 |
| SGP | | | | | 42 | 0.0 | 0.0 |
| Informal votes | | 1,820 | | | 1,155 | | |
| Total valid votes | | 185,018 | | | 185,683 | | |
| Turnout | | 186,838 | 81.5 | ▲7.2 | | | |
| Greens gain from SPD | Majority | 66 | 0.1 | | | | |

=== 2021 election ===
Federal election (2021): Berlin-Tempelhof-Schöneberg
| Notes: | Blue background denotes the winner of the electorate vote. Pink background denotes a candidate elected from their party list. Yellow background denotes an electorate win by a list member, or other incumbent. A ✓ or ✗ denotes status of any incumbent, win or lose respectively. | | | | | | |
| Party | Candidate | Votes | % | ±% | Party votes | % | ±% |
|---|---|---|---|---|---|---|---|
| SPD | Kevin Kühnert | 47,451 | 27.1 | ▲5.0 | 43,381 | 24.8 | ▲4.6 |
| Greens | Renate Künast | 44,021 | 25.1 | ▲6.2 | 44,209 | 25.2 | ▲9.6 |
| CDU | ✗ Jan-Marco Luczak | 38,400 | 21.9 | ▼7.0 | 31,883 | 18.2 | ▼6.8 |
| FDP | Lars Lindemann | 12,822 | 7.3 | ▲1.0 | 16,679 | 9.5 | ▼0.8 |
| Left | Alexander King | 10,673 | 6.1 | ▼4.7 | 13,160 | 7.5 | ▼5.7 |
| AfD | Frank-Christian Hansel | 10,005 | 5.7 | ▼3.3 | 10,907 | 6.2 | ▼3.3 |
| Tierschutzpartei | Martin Ullrich | 4,132 | 2.4 | | 3,764 | 2.1 | ▲0.9 |
| Team Todenhöfer | | | | | 2,602 | 1.5 | |
| PARTEI | Marie Geissler | 2,412 | 1.4 | ▼0.8 | 2,065 | 1.2 | ▼0.4 |
| dieBasis | Karsten Wappler | 1,989 | 1.1 | | | | |
| FW | Mario Rhode | 1,640 | 0.9 | | 1,519 | 0.9 | ▲0.7 |
| Die Grauen | | | | | 1,446 | 0.8 | ▲0.4 |
| Volt | | | | | 1,123 | 0.6 | |
| Pirates | Alexander Spies | 857 | 0.5 | ▼0.5 | 652 | 0.4 | ▼0.3 |
| Gesundheitsforschung | | | | | 356 | 0.2 | ▲0.1 |
| ÖDP | Kirsten Jäkel | 427 | 0.2 | | 327 | 0.2 | 0.0 |
| Menschliche Welt | Sahin Azbak | 305 | 0.2 | ▼0.3 | | | |
| Humanists | | | | | 258 | 0.1 | |
| du. | | | | | 227 | 0.1 | 0.0 |
| V-Partei3 | | | | | 123 | 0.1 | ▼0.1 |
| DKP | | | | | 116 | 0.1 | 0.0 |
| LKR | Thomas Konstantin Speich | 115 | 0.1 | | 96 | 0.1 | |
| NPD | | | | | 90 | 0.1 | |
| BüSo | | | | | 69 | 0.0 | 0.0 |
| MLPD | | | | | 46 | 0.0 | 0.0 |
| SGP | | | | | 39 | 0.0 | 0.0 |
| Informal votes | | 2,786 | | | 2,898 | | |
| Total valid votes | | 175,249 | | | 175,137 | | |
| Turnout | | 178,035 | 76.9 | ▼0.1 | | | |
| SPD gain from CDU | Majority | 3,430 | 2.0 | | | | |

=== 2017 election ===
Federal election (2017): Berlin-Tempelhof-Schöneberg
| Notes: | Blue background denotes the winner of the electorate vote. Pink background denotes a candidate elected from their party list. Yellow background denotes an electorate win by a list member, or other incumbent. A ✓ or ✗ denotes status of any incumbent, win or lose respectively. | | | | | | |
| Party | Candidate | Votes | % | ±% | Party votes | % | ±% |
|---|---|---|---|---|---|---|---|
| CDU | ✓ Jan-Marco Luczak | 51,708 | 28.9 | ▼6.0 | 44,721 | 25.0 | ▼6.7 |
| SPD | Mechthild Rawert | 39,380 | 22.0 | ▼4.2 | 36,179 | 20.2 | ▼7.2 |
| Greens | Renate Künast | 33,763 | 18.9 | ▼1.5 | 27,956 | 15.6 | ▲0.2 |
| Left | Alexander King | 19,356 | 10.8 | ▲3.5 | 23,625 | 13.2 | ▲2.9 |
| AfD | Lothar Mundt | 16,188 | 9.1 | ▲5.4 | 17,108 | 9.6 | ▲5.0 |
| FDP | Holger Krestel | 11,362 | 6.4 | ▲4.9 | 18,569 | 10.4 | ▲6.3 |
| PARTEI | Roman Archner | 3,852 | 2.2 | ▲1.3 | 2,912 | 1.6 | ▲0.7 |
| Tierschutzpartei | | | | | 2,180 | 1.2 | |
| Pirates | Alexander Spies | 1,691 | 0.9 | ▼2.1 | 1,179 | 0.7 | ▼2.5 |
| Die Grauen | | | | | 793 | 0.4 | |
| DiB | | | | | 635 | 0.3 | |
| BGE | | | | | 601 | 0.3 | |
| Menschliche Welt | Sahin Azbak | 766 | 0.4 | | 374 | 0.2 | |
| FW | | | | | 373 | 0.2 | ▼0.2 |
| DM | | | | | 360 | 0.2 | |
| du. | | | | | 294 | 0.2 | |
| ÖDP | | | | | 274 | 0.2 | 0.0 |
| Gesundheitsforschung | | | | | 250 | 0.1 | |
| V-Partei³ | | | | | 249 | 0.1 | |
| BüSo | Jonathan Thron | 403 | 0.2 | 0.0 | 127 | 0.1 | ▼0.1 |
| MLPD | | | | | 113 | 0.1 | 0.0 |
| DKP | | | | | 94 | 0.1 | |
| SGP | Christoph Vandreier | 197 | 0.1 | | 60 | 0.0 | 0.0 |
| B* | | | | | 35 | 0.0 | |
| Informal votes | | 2,493 | | | 2,078 | | |
| Total valid votes | | 178,666 | | | 179,081 | | |
| Turnout | | 181,159 | 77.0 | ▲1.7 | | | |
| CDU hold | Majority | 12,328 | 6.9 | ▼1.9 | | | |

=== 2013 election ===
Federal election (2013): Berlin-Tempelhof-Schöneberg
| Notes: | Blue background denotes the winner of the electorate vote. Pink background denotes a candidate elected from their party list. Yellow background denotes an electorate win by a list member, or other incumbent. A ✓ or ✗ denotes status of any incumbent, win or lose respectively. | | | | | | |
| Party | Candidate | Votes | % | ±% | Party votes | % | ±% |
|---|---|---|---|---|---|---|---|
| CDU | ✓ Jan-Marco Luczak | 60,926 | 35.0 | ▲2.5 | 55,275 | 31.7 | ▲5.0 |
| SPD | Mechthild Rawert | 45,659 | 26.2 | ▼3.6 | 47,834 | 27.4 | ▲6.0 |
| Greens | Renate Künast | 35,461 | 20.4 | ▼5.9 | 26,941 | 15.4 | ▼6.1 |
| Left | Azize Tank | 12,801 | 7.4 | ▼0.8 | 17,937 | 10.3 | ▲0.3 |
| AfD | Franz Niggemann | 6,391 | 3.7 | | 7,988 | 4.6 | |
| Pirates | Frank Röder | 5,233 | 3.0 | | 5,526 | 3.2 | ▲0.4 |
| FDP | Holger Krestel | 2,585 | 1.5 | ▼6.4 | 7,134 | 4.1 | ▼9.7 |
| NPD | Thomas Hübener | 1,789 | 1.0 | ▼0.4 | 1,588 | 0.9 | ▼0.2 |
| PARTEI | Chris Schiller | 1,494 | 0.9 | | 1,578 | 0.9 | |
| FW | Moritz Enders | 905 | 0.5 | | 759 | 0.4 | |
| BIG | Raşit Tanriverdi | 567 | 0.3 | | 473 | 0.3 | |
| PRO | | | | | 481 | 0.3 | |
| ÖDP | | | | | 342 | 0.2 | 0.0 |
| BüSo | Wolfgang Lillge | 348 | 0.2 | ▼0.6 | 221 | 0.1 | ▼0.1 |
| REP | | | | | 219 | 0.1 | ▼0.2 |
| MLPD | | | | | 73 | 0.0 | 0.0 |
| PSG | | | | | 63 | 0.0 | 0.0 |
| Informal votes | | 3,046 | | | 2,773 | | |
| Total valid votes | | 174,159 | | | 174,432 | | |
| Turnout | | 177,205 | 75.3 | ▲1.0 | | | |
| CDU hold | Majority | 15,267 | 8.8 | ▼1.1 | | | |

=== 2009 election ===
Federal election (2009): Berlin-Tempelhof-Schöneberg
| Notes: | Blue background denotes the winner of the electorate vote. Pink background denotes a candidate elected from their party list. Yellow background denotes an electorate win by a list member, or other incumbent. A ✓ or ✗ denotes status of any incumbent, win or lose respectively. | | | | | | |
| Party | Candidate | Votes | % | ±% | Party votes | % | ±% |
|---|---|---|---|---|---|---|---|
| CDU | Jan-Marco Luczak | 54,971 | 32.5 | ▼0.4 | 45,372 | 26.7 | ▼0.6 |
| Greens | Renate Künast | 44,506 | 26.3 | ▲5.3 | 36,630 | 21.6 | ▲4.7 |
| SPD | ✗ Mechthild Rawert | 38,244 | 22.6 | ▼11.6 | 36,351 | 21.4 | ▼13.1 |
| Left | Figen Izgin | 13,787 | 8.1 | ▲3.4 | 16,995 | 10.0 | ▲3.2 |
| FDP | Holger Krestel | 13,292 | 7.8 | ▲3.8 | 23,407 | 13.8 | ▲3.8 |
| Pirates | | | | | 4,619 | 2.7 | |
| Tierschutzpartei | | | | | 2,270 | 1.3 | |
| NPD | Danny Matschke | 2,413 | 1.4 | ▲0.2 | 1,891 | 1.1 | ▲0.1 |
| DIE VIOLETTEN | | | | | 598 | 0.4 | |
| REP | | | | | 545 | 0.3 | ▼0.2 |
| BüSo | Uwe Raake | 1,328 | 0.8 | ▲0.6 | 463 | 0.3 | ▲0.2 |
| Independent | Klaus Pfeifer | 854 | 0.5 | | | | |
| ÖDP | | | | | 335 | 0.2 | |
| DVU | | | | | 192 | 0.1 | |
| DKP | | | | | 101 | 0.1 | |
| PSG | | | | | 86 | 0.1 | 0.0 |
| MLPD | | | | | 72 | 0.0 | 0.0 |
| Informal votes | | 3,533 | | | 3,001 | | |
| Total valid votes | | 169,395 | | | 169,927 | | |
| Turnout | | 172,928 | 74.3 | ▼5.0 | | | |
| CDU gain from SPD | Majority | 10,465 | 6.2 | | | | |

=== 2005 election ===
Federal election (2005):Berlin-Tempelhof-Schöneberg
| Notes: | Blue background denotes the winner of the electorate vote. Pink background denotes a candidate elected from their party list. Yellow background denotes an electorate win by a list member, or other incumbent. A ✓ or ✗ denotes status of any incumbent, win or lose respectively. | | | | | | |
| Party | Candidate | Votes | % | ±% | Party votes | % | ±% |
|---|---|---|---|---|---|---|---|
| SPD | Mechthild Rawert | 62,125 | 34.2 | ▼1.6 | 62,854 | 34.5 | ▼0.5 |
| CDU | Peter Rzepka | 59,787 | 32.9 | ▼1.8 | 49,847 | 27.3 | ▼4.7 |
| Greens | Renate Künast | 38,198 | 21.0 | ▲1.0 | 30,703 | 16.8 | ▼1.9 |
| Left | Hakki Keskin | 8,538 | 4.7 | ▲3.0 | 12,395 | 6.8 | ▲4.4 |
| FDP | Ebbing Harmut | 7,396 | 4.1 | ▼1.6 | 18,254 | 10.0 | ▲2.2 |
| GRAUEN | | | | | 3,392 | 1.9 | ▲1.0 |
| NPD | Richard Miosga | 2,202 | 1.2 | | 1,854 | 1.0 | ▲0.8 |
| Feminist | Monika Christann | 1,327 | 0.7 | ▲0.2 | 811 | 0.4 | ▲0.1 |
| Independent | Franziska Sylla | 1,015 | 0.6 | | | | |
| PARTEI | Moritz Reichelt | 995 | 0.5 | | 775 | 0.4 | |
| REP | | | | | 893 | 0.5 | ▼0.1 |
| BüSo | Jörg Pinkawa | 330 | 0.2 | 0.0 | 220 | 0.1 | 0.0 |
| APPD | | | | | 184 | 0.1 | |
| SGP | | | | | 125 | 0.1 | |
| MLPD | | | | | 64 | 0.0 | |
| Informal votes | | 3,680 | | | 3,222 | | |
| Total valid votes | | 181,913 | | | 182,371 | | |
| Turnout | | 185,593 | 79.3 | ▼1.3 | | | |
| SPD hold | Majority | 2,338 | 1.3 | | | | |
