= Christine Theiss =

German kickboxer

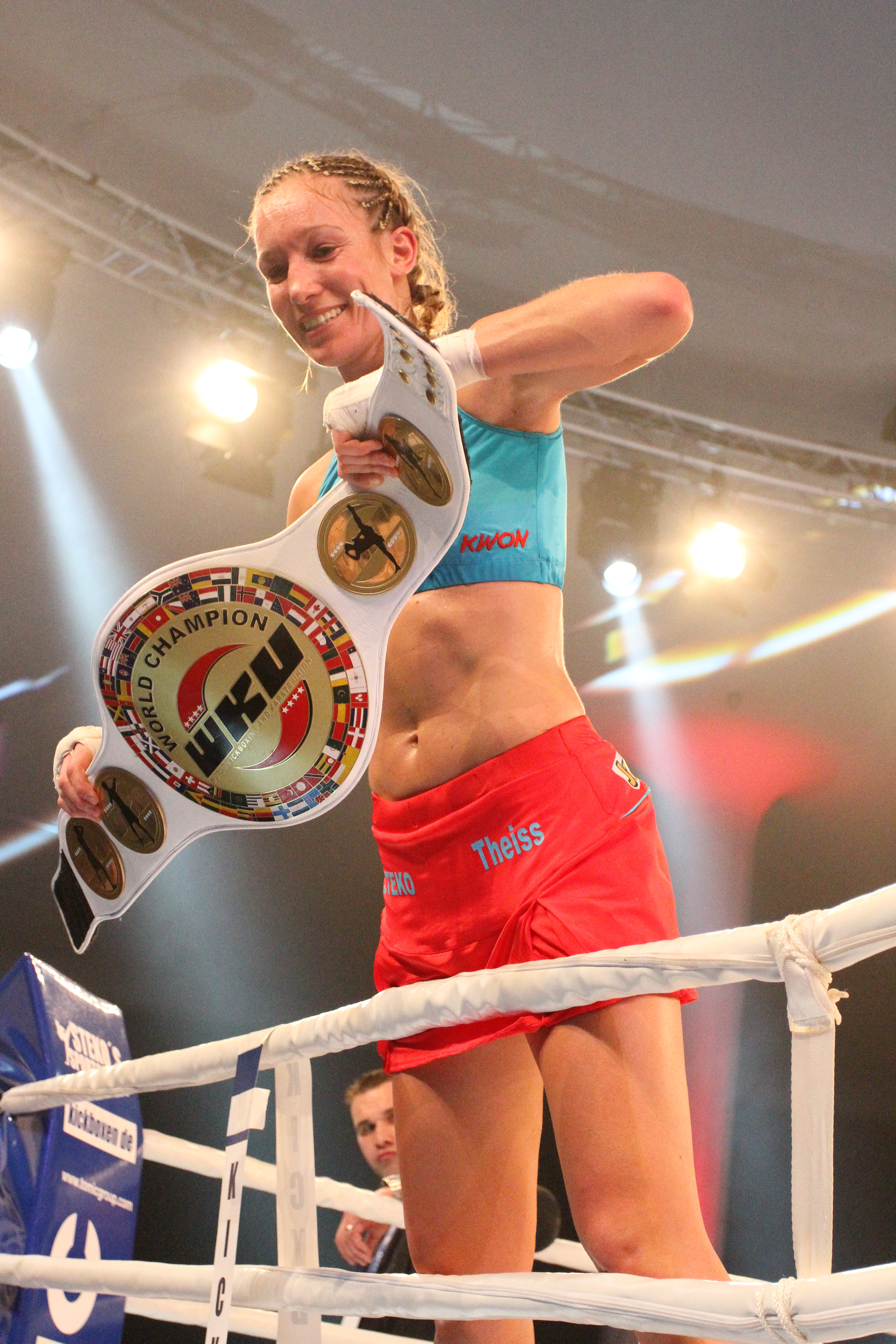
- Theiss in 2013
- Born: Christine Hennig; 22 February 1980 (age 46); Greiz, East Germany
- Height: 1.75 m (5 ft 9 in)
- Division: Super lightweight

Kickboxing record
- Total: 36
- Wins: 35
- By knockout: 12
- Losses: 1
- By knockout: 0
- Draws: 0
- No contests: 0

Other information
- Spouse: Hans Theiss (m. 2005)
- Website: christinetheiss.de

Christine Anna Maria Theiss (née Hennig, born 22 February 1980) is a German former kickboxer. Since 2007, she is the world champion in professional full contact kickboxing in the World Kickboxing Association (WKA). On 7 December 2012, she became the super lightweight world champion in full contact kickboxing of the International Sport Karate Association (ISKA) and World Kickboxing and Karate Union (WKU). She lost her WKU championship in a title fight to Olga Stavrova on 7 June 2013, but regained the title on 13 December 2013, by defeating Olga Stavrova in a closely contested 10-round decision in what was announced to be her last fight.

== Personal life ==
In 1984, Theiss moved with her parents from East Germany to Bayreuth, where she attended elementary school and high school. She then, worked as a medical assistant in the parental practice in Bayreuth. From 2001 to 2007, Theiss studied medicine at LMU Munich. In November 2007, she completed the study with the state examination. In December 2008, she received her doctorate in medicine (Dr. med.).

Since March 2012, Theiss is a host for the German version of The Biggest Loser Germany on Sat.1. From 2005 to 2012, she was elected as "Munich's Sportwoman of the Year" by the readers of the evening newspaper Abendzeitung.

Since 2005, Theiss is married to cardiologist Hans Theiss and lives in the Munich district of Schwabing. In 2016, she gave birth to her first child a daughter.

== Career ==
From 1988 to 2000, Theiss learned semi-contact kickboxing in the Karate Dojo Aleksandar eV in Bayreuth. In 1998, she became the German Champion. In 2003, she switched to full-contact kickboxing at the Kampfsportzentrum Steko in Munich. She successively became German champion, European silver medalist, World runner-up and 2005 Amateur World Champion (WKA).

Since early 2006, Theiss fights as a professional kickboxer. She is trained by the former kickboxing world champions Mladen Steko and Pavlica Steko. Mladen Steko is also her manager. Having won 22 world championship fights, Theiss is considered to be one of the most successful professional kickboxers of all times and a celebrity in Germany.

Since January 2011, she has an exclusive contract for the television broadcasts of her bouts with Sat.1 (Steko's Fight Night). On 7 December 2012, she fought for the first time according to the rules of the ISKA and WKU, winning the world championship title winning the world championship title in the weight class of 62.5 kg. On 22 February 2013, she defeated Cathy Le-Mée, the WKA and WKU world champion in the weight class of 65 kg per KO in the fifth round.

On 18 April 2013, she announced that she would end her career at the end of 2013. She lost her fight against Russian kickboxer Olga Stavrova on 7 June 2013, in Munich after ten rounds by split decision. After the fight, she announced her desire to fight a revanche against Olga Stavrova. She won that rematch and regained the title on 13 December 2013, by defeating her in a closely contested 10-round decision. It was announced to be her last fight.

== Kickboxing Record ==
Kickboxing world championship bouts
Year	Date	Opponent	Location	Association	Result	Type	Rounds
2007	25 May	Wales Rachel Kirkhouse	Vilamoura	WAKO	Win	Decision	5
2007	8 Dec	Italy Donatella Panu	München	WKA	Win	TKO	8
2008	8 Mar	Norway Grete Hall	Munich	WKA	Win	TKO	3
2008	31 May	Greece Maria Konstantelou	Stuttgart	WKA	Win	Decision	10
2008	27 Sep	Portugal Raquel Gaspar	Munich	WKA	Win	TKO	4
2008	13 Dec	Hungary Kata Sátorhegyi	Munich	WKA	Win	TKO	9
2009	6 Mar	United Kingdom Stacey Parker	Munich	WKA	Win	Decision	10
2009	15 May	Spain Mar Guerrero	Pforzheim	WKA	Win	TKO	10
2009	25 Sep	Portugal Ana Tome	Munich	WKA	Win	Decision	10
2009	Dec 5	Belgium Kate Mintiens	Munich	WKA	Win	TKO	8
2010	20 Mar	Italy Caterina Currò	Munich	WKA	Win	Decision	10
2010	15 May	Greece Maria Pantazi	Karlsruhe	WKA	Win	Decision	10
2010	4 Sep	Spain Iman Chairi Ghbalou	Cologne	WKA	Win	TKO	6
2010	20 Nov	Ukraine Lena Ovchynnikova	Dresden	WKA	Win	KO	6
2011	19 Feb	Italy Paola Cappucci	Stuttgart	WKA	Win	Decision	10
2011	28 May	South Korea Lim Su-Jeong	Munich	WKA	Win	Decision	10
2011	26 Aug	Russia Marina Zueva	Karlsruhe	WKA	Win	Decision	10
2011	Dec 16	Czech Republic Martina Müllerová	Munich	WKA	Win	KO	2
2012	2 Mar	Bosnia and Herzegovina Olja Žerajić	Munich	WKA	Win	Decision	10
2012	18 May	Germany Ania Fucz	Munich	WKA	Win	Decision	10
2012	7 Dec	Bosnia and Herzegovina Sanja Samardžić	Berlin	ISKA/WKU	Win	TKO	4
2013	22 Feb	France Cathy Le-Mée	Munich	WKU	Win	TKO	5
2013	7 June	Russia Olga Stavrova	Munich	WKU	Loss	Decision	10
2013	13 Dec	Russia Olga Stavrova	Bayreuth	WKU	Win	Decision	10
