= Fritz Wittmann =

German politician and lawyer

Member of the Bundestag; from Bavaria
- In office 22 August 1996 – 26 October 1998
- Preceded by: Simon Wittmann
- Succeeded by: Georg Girisch
- Constituency: Weiden
- In office 6 September 1971 – 10 November 1994
- Preceded by: Wolfgang Pohle
- Succeeded by: Johannes Singhammer
- Constituency: Kempten (1971–1972); State list (1972–1983); Munich North (1983–1994)

Personal details
- Born: 21 March 1933 Planá, Czechoslovakia
- Died: 17 October 2018 (aged 85) Munich, Germany
- Party: Christian Social Union
- Children: 3, including Mechthilde
- Education: LMU Munich

Fritz Wittmann (21 March 1933 – 17 October 2018) was a German politician (CSU) and lawyer.

== Biography ==
Wittmann was born in Planá in Czechoslovakia's region of Egerland (today Planá in the Czech Republic). He was a member of the German Parliament (first elected in 1971), where he represented Munich North, and president of the Federation of Expellees (Bund der Vertriebenen) from 1994 to 1998. He was succeeded as president of the federation by Erika Steinbach (CDU).

He was a colonel in the reserve and recipient of the Badge of Honour of the Bundeswehr in Gold.

== Personal life ==
Wittmann was married and had three children. His daughter Mechthilde Wittmann is a CSU politician.
