= Lars Lindemann =

German politician (born 1971)

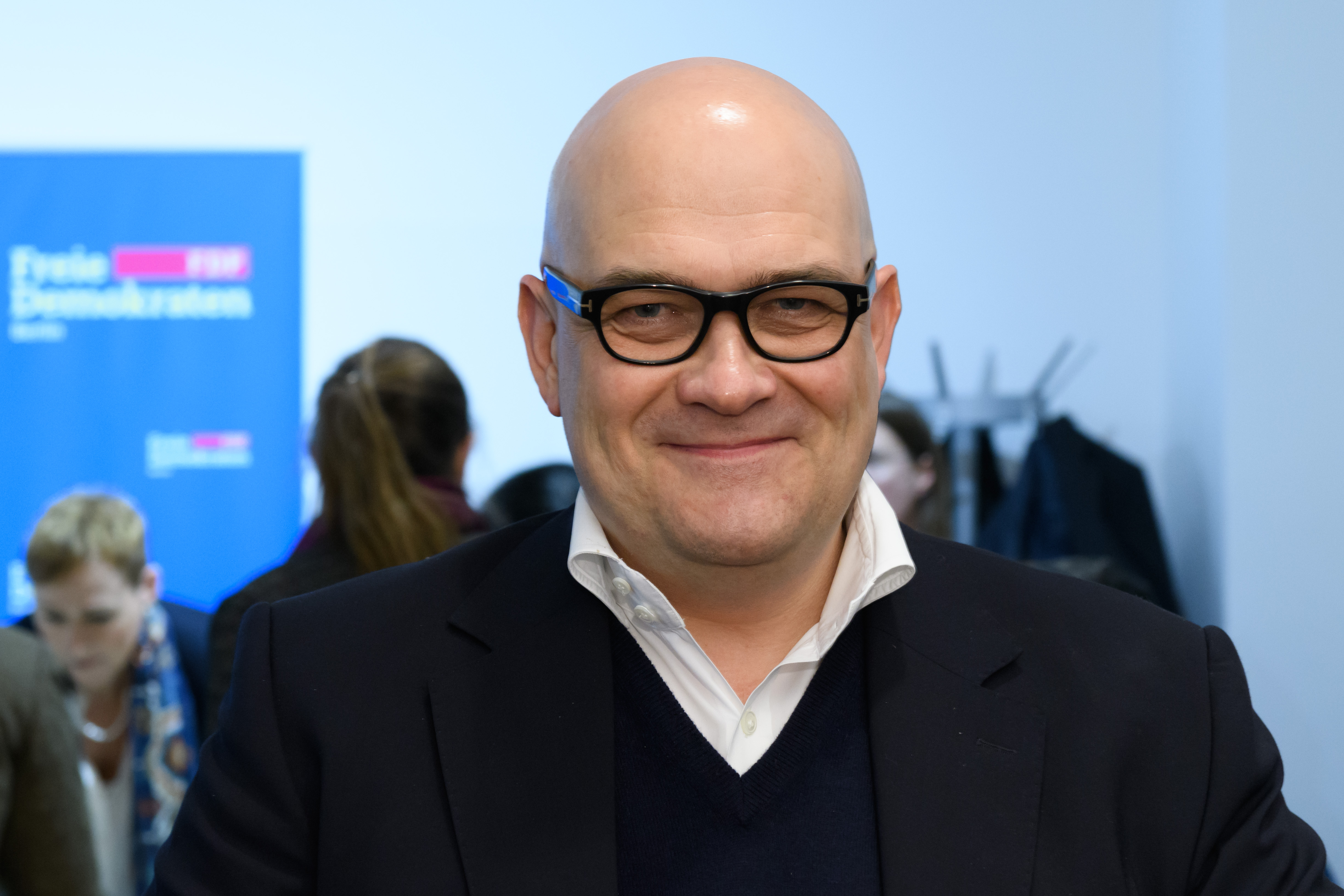

Member of the Bundestag
- In office 2021–2024

Personal details
- Born: 9 May 1971 (age 55) Herzberg, East Germany (now Germany)
- Party: FDP
- Education: University of Giessen

Lars Lindemann (born 9 May 1971) is a German lawyer and politician of the Free Democratic Party who served as a member of the Bundestag from 2009 to 2013 and again from 2021 to 2024.

== Early life and education ==
Lindemann was born in 1971 in the East German town of Herzberg.

== Career ==
From 2013 to 2021, he was chief executive of the Spitzenverband Fachärzte Deutschlands (German Specialist Doctors' Association). Since November 2024, Lindemann has been the chief lobbyist for the pharmaceutical division of Bayer AG.

== Political career ==
From 2009 to 2013, Lindemann was a member of the Bundestag, representing the Berlin-Tempelhof-Schöneberg district. During that time, he served on the Health Committee.

In 2017, Lindemann was one of the candidates to become chair of the Federal Joint Committee (GBA).

Lindemann became a member of the Bundestag again in the 2021 elections. He joined the Health Committee again. In addition to his committee assignments, Lindemann was part of the Parliamentary Friendship Group for Relations with Malta and Cyprus.

== Controversies ==
In May 2013, Lindemann received criticism from his own FDP youth organization (Young Liberals), which accused him of lobbying. Lindemann announced only one week after his election to second place on the list for the 2013 German federal election that he would accept the profession of chief executive of the Spitzenverbandes Fachärzte Deutschlands (National Association of Specialists in Germany). He also worked in a law firm that "specializes in clients from the medical technology and healthcare industries". The JuLis saw this as a conflict of interest with Lindemann's membership in the health committee of the Bundestag.

== Other activities ==
- Ideal Lebensversicherung, Member of the Supervisory Board
