= Bernhard Loos =

German politician (born 1955)

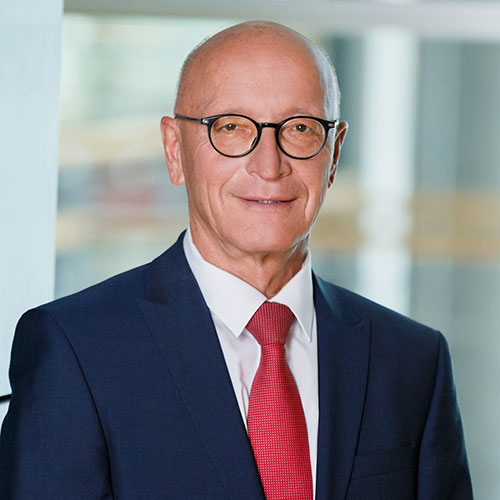

Member of the Bundestag; for Munich North
- In office 24 October 2017 – 25 March 2025
- Preceded by: Johannes Singhammer
- Succeeded by: Hans Theiss

Personal details
- Born: 30 July 1955 (age 71) Kaufbeuren, West Germany
- Party: Christian Social Union
- Children: 2
- Education: LMU Munich

Bernhard Loos (born 30 July 1955) is a German politician of the Christian Social Union in Bavaria (CSU) who has been serving as a member of the Bundestag from the state of Bavaria from 2017 to 2025.

== Early life and career ==
Loos went through an apprenticeship as a retail salesman after his Abitur from 1976 to 1980 and worked as a salesman at Hertie in Munich.

From 1981 Loos studied economics and political science at LMU Munich, and graduated in 1987. After his studies, Loos was appointed managing director of the Kolping Society in Munich.

He is part of the scientific fraternity Palladia, which he reactivated in 1983 after a thirteen-year suspension.

Bernhard Loos is Roman Catholic, married and father of two adult sons. He served his military service in the German Air Force.

== Political career ==
=== Career in local politics ===
Loos joined the CSU Munich in 1982 and was a member of the executive board of the Junge Union in Bavaria from 1985 to 1986. During the time of his studies he was involved in the university political student association Ring Christlich-Demokratischer Studenten in Bavaria. There he acted, among other things, as deputy group chairman and was elected as state chairman for 1985 to 1986. Loos is a member of the CSU district executive in Munich.

For the 2013 German federal election Loos was elected by the CSU delegates' assembly on place 59 of the electoral list, the place was not enough for becoming member of the Bundestag.

=== Member of the German Parliament (2017–2025) ===
Loos first became a member of the Bundestag after the 2017 German federal election winning the constituency of Munich North. On November 9, 2016, Loos was elected by the federal constituency delegates meeting of his party as a direct candidate. He thus prevailed against the president of the Bund der Vertriebenen Bernd Fabritius, MdB, and thus succeeds Johannes Singhammer. He won the direct mandate with 32.2% of the vote.

In parliament, Loos has been a member of the Committee on Petitions and the Committee on Economic and Energy Affairs.

Loos was able to defend his direct mandate in the 2021 German federal election with 25.7%.
