= Hans Theiss =

German politician (born 1977)

Hans Theiss MdB
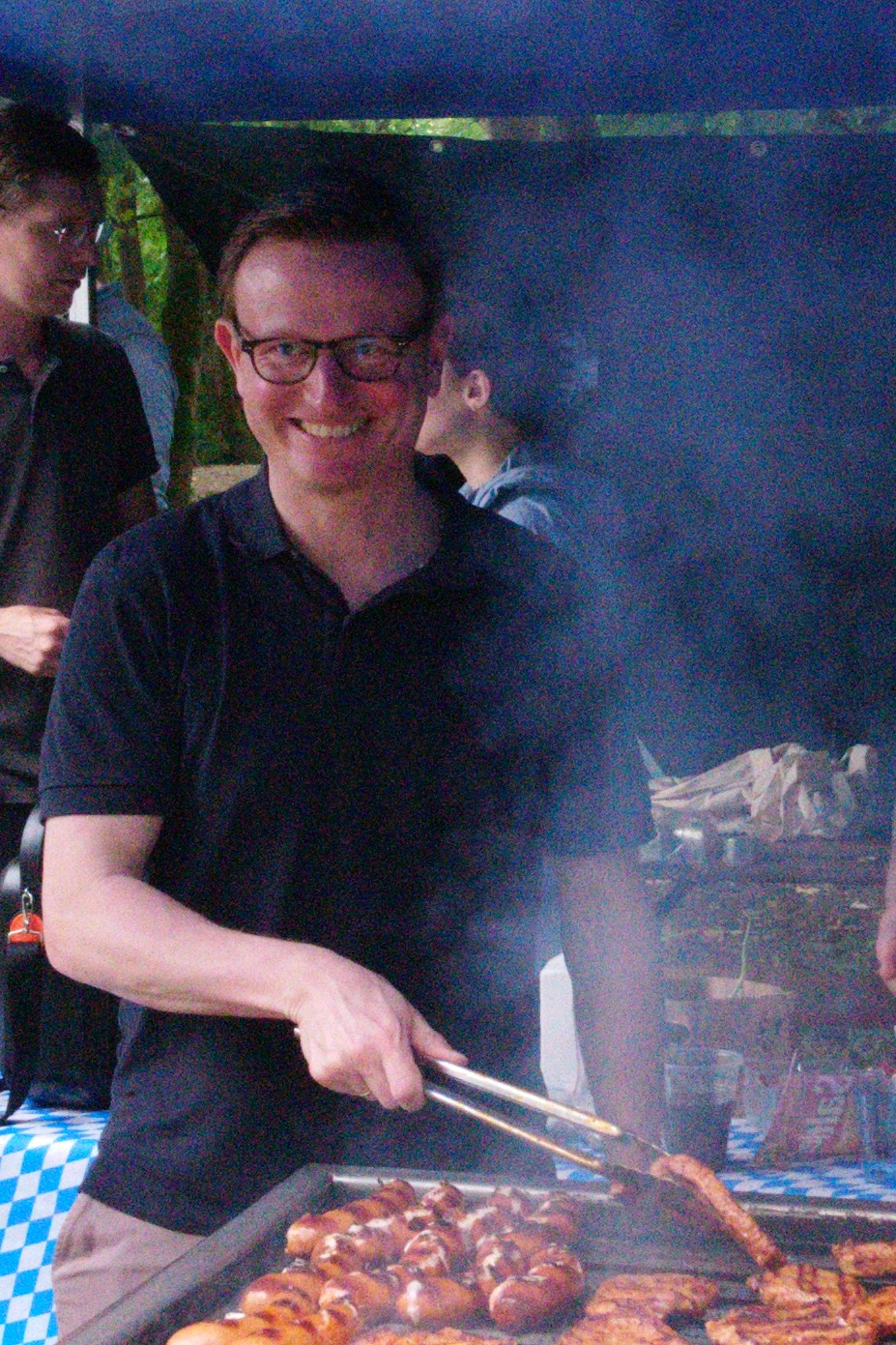
- Theiss in 2026

Member of the Bundestag; for Munich North
- Incumbent
- Assumed office 25 March 2025
- Preceded by: Bernhard Loos

Personal details
- Born: 20 September 1977 (age 48) Munich, West Germany
- Party: Christian Social Union (since 2002)
- Spouse: Christine Hennig (m. 2005)
- Children: 1
- Education: LMU Munich

Hans Diogenes Theiss (born 20 September 1977) is a German cardiologist and politician of the Christian Social Union (CSU) who has been serving as a member of the Bundestag since the 2025 elections, representing the Munich North district.

== Political career ==
Theiss has been a member of the CSU since 2002. He served as city councillor of Munich from 2014 to 2025, where he served as his political group's spokesperson on health policy.

In parliament, Theiss has been a member of the Health Committee and the Committee on Research, Technology, Space and Technology Assessment. In this capacity, he is his parliamentary group’s rapporteur on biotechnology and the Max Planck Society.

== Other activities ==
- Stadtwerke München, Member of the Supervisory Board (–2025)

== Personal life ==
In 2005, Theiss married former kickboxer Christine Theiss.
