= The Biggest Loser Germany =

German version of the TV show The Biggest Loser

- Starring: Katharina Witt (Host: 2009); Regina Halmich (Host: 2010–2011); Christine Theiss (Host: 2012-2021)
- Country of origin: Germany; Hungary (2009); Spain (2010,2012-); Austria (2011)
- No. of series: 13
- No. of episodes: 141

Production
- Running time: 60 - 180 mins

Original release
- Network: ProSieben (2009) kabel eins (2010-2011); Sat.1 (2012-)
- Release: 2009 – present

The German version of The Biggest Loser started in 2009 on ProSieben. The following seasons switched channels inside the ProSiebenSat.1 network, season two and three airing on kabel eins and since season four on Sat.1.

== Series overview ==
Season	Year	Production Country	Host	Coaches	Winner
1	2009; Details	Budapest, Hungary	Katarina Witt	Nele Sehrt; Wojtek Vetter; Jola Jaromin (Food-Expert)	Enrico
2	2010; Details	Mallorca, Spain	Regina Halmich	Silke Kayadelen; Andreas Büdeker dr. med. Christine Tabacu (Doctor)	Heino
3	2011; Details	Ischgl, Austria	Regina Halmich	Silke Kayadelen; Andreas Büdeker dr. med. Christine Tabacu (Doctor)	Carlo
4	2012; Details	Andalusia, Spain	Christine Theiss	Bineta Coulibaly; Nunzio Esposito dr. med. Christine Tabacu (Doctor)	Jack
5	2013; Details	Andalusia, Spain	Christine Theiss	Silke Kayadelen; Ramin Abtin dr. med. Christine Tabacu (Doctor)	Paride
6	2014; Details	Andalusia, Spain	Christine Theiss	Silke Kayadelen; Ramin Abtin dr. med. Christine Tabacu (Doctor)	Marc

=== Trainers ===
Trainers	Seasons									
Trainers	1	2	3	4	5	6	7	8	9	10
Nele Sehrt	♦									
Wojtek Vetter	♦									
Silke Kayadelen		♦	♦		♦	♦				
Andreas Büdeker		♦	♦							
Bineta Coulibaly				♦						
Nunzio Esposito				♦						
Ramin Abtin					♦	♦	♦	♦	♦	♦
Detlef Soost							♦			
Mareike Spaleck								♦	♦	♦

=== Winners ===
Season	Winner	Age	Starting weight (kg)	Final weight	Percentage lost
1	Enrico	30	191.6	96.6	50.42
2	Heino	37	158.1	93.6	40.80
3	Carlo	41	145.6	86.6	40.52
4	Jack	47	142	76	46.45
5	Paride	21	126.2	63	49.92
6	Marc	18	184	97.7	46.90
Teens	Erfan	18	163.1	104	36.24
7	Stefan	44	143.1	77.7	45.70
8	Ali	36	173.8	87.4	49.71
9	Alexandra	33	103.4	50.2	51.45
10	Saki	33	189.6	95.1	49.84

== Seasons on ProSieben ==
=== Season One ===
Season one was shown on ProSieben in early 2009. The show was hosted by retired figure skater Katharina Witt and filmed on a Hacienda near Budapest. The season consisted of 7 episodes and featured 14 candidates contesting for a 100,000 € first prize. The season had mostly negative critiques and was not renewed. The season was won by Enrico Proba who lost over 50% of his starting weight. He won the first prize of 100,000 €, Falko gained 10,000 € for second and René got 5,000 €. After the show, Enrico works in dietics and is a fitness trainer.

== Seasons on kabel eins ==
=== Season Two ===
Season two of The Biggest Loser was held in 2010 on Mallorca. The slogan of that season was Abspecken im Doppelpack (Losing weight in double pack). The host was retired boxer Regina Halmich. There were eight teams with 2 persons each. One team was evicted each week until three were left, after which the teams were dissolved and everyone was as individuals. The first prize was much lower this season with the winner getting only 25,000 € and nothing going to second and third place. The biggest loser title was won by Heino from Hamburg who shared the prize with his teammate Sven, who finished third.

=== Season Three ===
After the success of season two with average market shares of 6.4% within the target group of 14- to 49-year-olds Kabel Eins announced a season three for March 2011. The will be no changes in host or trainers, and the show will be taped in Ischgl, Austria.

The season started on 15 March 2011 and featured 9 couples. The winner received 25.000 €.

== Seasons on Sat.1 ==
All of these seasons were hosted in Andalusia.

=== Season Four ===
In 2012 a fourth season was shown on Sat.1 with kickboxer Christine Theiss as a new host.

=== Season Five ===
In 2013 Biggest Loser returned for a fifth season.

=== Season Six ===
In 2014 there was a sixth season. The episodes were aired every Wednesday at 8:15 pm. There also was a Biggest Loser Teens season in the second half of the year.

=== Season Seven ===
In 2015 Biggest Loser returned for a seventh season. Eight men and eight women completed under the motto men versus women.
