= Ania Fucz =

German kickboxer

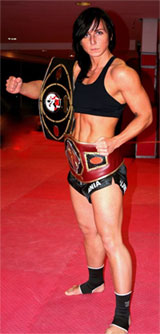
- Born: Anna Fucz; July 18, 1981 (age 45); Wrocław, Poland
- Nationality: (Germany) German (Poland) Polish
- Height: 5 ft 6 in (1.68 m)
- Weight: 123 lb (56 kg; 8.8 st)
- Division: Flyweight (MMA); Welterweight (kickboxing)
- Reach: 70.0 in (178 cm)
- Style: Boxing, Muay Thai
- Stance: Orthodox

Kickboxing record
- Total: 52
- Wins: 42
- By knockout: 8
- Losses: 10

Mixed martial arts record
- Total: 3
- Wins: 3
- By knockout: 1
- By decision: 2
- Losses: 0

Other information
- Mixed martial arts record from Sherdog

Ania Fucz (born July 18, 1981) is a German female kickboxer and mixed martial artist of Polish descent, based in Würselen, Germany. She competes professionally since 2005 and was the ISKA Welterweight champion.

== Life ==
The native Pole Ania Fucz moved to Germany with her family at the age of eight. She now lives in Wurselen near Aachen. There she also exercises her profession as a banker.

== Sports career ==
Ania Fucz came quite late to kickboxing. The foundation for her career as a Muay Thai fighter was placed on a visit to a martial arts event. Their active phase began in 2005, initially with the amateurs. As a member of the German national team, she played numerous battles abroad, in South Korea, China and more in Thailand. Since 2013, she has also been active as a mixed martial arts fighter.

Fucz has been trained for many years by Uwe Göbkes in the martial arts center mujoken-ki-dojo. According to Göbke, she is the most athletic sportsman he has ever experienced. She herself is now supervising and training the youngest offspring. In 2014 she moved her sporty home to the University of Fighting in Düsseldorf.

== Most important achievements of their sports career ==
=== Kickboxing ===
In 2005, Fucz joined the association mujoken-ki-Dojo, and in the following year, he was already NRW-Landesmeisterin and German Vizemeisterin Muay Thai. In 2007, she was able to defend her title as NRW regional champion. In addition, Fucz contested their first bouts in K-1 among the pros. The title of German champion and European champion won Fucz in 2008. She had her first fight in Thailand, the motherland of her sport, which ended victoriously for her. As a member of the national team, she took part in the World Cup in South Korea. In 2009, Fucz contested a fight at the King's Cup in Bangkok, an event regularly attended by more than 120,000 spectators. It was followed by the participation in the World Cup in Thailand, from which she took home a bronze medal. For the pros, she became the European champion in K-1 by the version of I.K.B.F. In the same year, a successful title defense was achieved. The first world championship belt of the I.K.B.F. Ania Fucz was able to strap on on 5 June 2010. As the only German, she fought at the first Sportaccord Combat Games in China and won a bronze medal. Winner of the European Cup in Dresden was Fucz in 2011 and defended this year her world title again with a victory. On May 18, 2012, Fucz entered a full-fledged WKA World Cup in full-contact kickboxing against the undefeated Christine Theiss, who lost her by points. Already 15 days later, she again rose into the ring to defend her own title. Against the Swede Elna Nilsson, she won a clear point victory at the Championsnight II in Aachen. On September 1, 2012, Fucz contested the only female fight of the main program at the Mix Fight Gala XIII in the Fraport Arena. Against the Dutch Sarah Debaieb, a unanimous victory after points. On June 8, 2013, Fucz, for the first time in her new ISKA association, won a world championship match against the Dutch Salaysa van den Bos at the Champions Night III in Aachen. The combatants regarded the fight unanimously for Fucz.

=== Mixed Martial Arts ===
Ania Fucz at the event "German MMA Championship GMC 4 next level" in Herne on July 6, 2013, debuted in MMA. She won against Jana Lorenz by unanimous decision-making by the camp champions. As part of the Champions Night IV on September 7, 2013, she was to fight her second MMA fight. Due to several short-term injuries-related cancellations, the event was moved to a date to be determined. On 29 November 2014 Fucz then contested their second fight in the context of the event "It's Lanna Time 2" in Bochum. In round 2, she won over Cinja Kiefer through TKO.

== Titles ==
- 2014 – IKBO World Champion, 61 kg
- 2014 – ISKA World Champion K1
- 2014 – I.K.B.F. World Champion K1
- 2014 – ISKA World Welterweight Title (66 kg)

== Kickboxing record ==
Kickboxing Record (incomplete)
42 Wins (8 KO's), 10 Losses, 0 Draws
Date	Result	Opponent	Event	Location	Method	Round	Time	Record
November 12, 2016	Loss	(Croatia) Marija Malenica	SUPERKOMBAT: Paraschiv vs. Ngimbi	Bucharest, Romania	Decision (unanimous)	3	3:00	
For SUPERKOMBAT Bantamweight World title.
September 10, 2016	Win	(Czech Republic) Eliška Pelechova	Ladies Fight Night 3: The FeMMAgeddon	Warsaw, Poland	Decision (unanimous)	3	3:00	
June 4, 2016	Win	(Netherlands) Ilsury Hendrikse	W5 European League XXXIV	Zagreb, Croatia	Decision (unanimous)	3	3:00	
May 30, 2015	Win	(Slovakia) Lucia Krajčovič	Full Fight 1: Slovakia & Czech vs Russia	Banská Bystrica, Slovakia	Decision (unanimous)	3	3:00	
September 27, 2014	Win	(Germany) Lisa Schewe	Night for Masters	Mülheim an der Ruhr, Germany	Points	5	3:00	
Won IKBO World title.
June 8, 2013	Win	(Netherlands) Salaysa van den Bos	Champions Night 3	Aachen, Germany	Points	5	3:00	
Won ISKA World title.
September 1, 2012	Win	(Netherlands) Sarah Debaieb	Mix Fight Gala 13	Frankfurt, Germany	Decision (unanimous)	3	3:00	
June 2, 2012	Win	(Sweden) Elna Nilsson	Champions Night 2	Aachen, Germany	Decision	5	3:00	
Defended IKBF World title.
May 18, 2012	Loss	(Germany) Christine Theiss	Steko's Fight Night	Munich, Germany	Decision (unanimous)	10	2:00	
For WKA World title.
May 14, 2011	Win	(Morocco) Chajmaa Bellakhal	Masters Fight Night	Duisburg, Germany	Decision	5	3:00	
Defended IKBF World title.
July 5, 2010	Win	(Thailand) Pimnipa Tanawatpipat	Fight Night Würselen	Würselen, Germany	Points	5	3:00	
Won IKBF World title.
March 27, 2010	Win	(Morocco) Chajmaa Bellakhal	Battle of the South 8	Hoensbroek, Netherlands	Points	3	3:00	
December 5, 2009	Loss	(Canada) Sandra Bastian	King's Birthday 2009 Show	Bangkok, Thailand	Decision	4	2:00	
December 13, 2008	Win	(Germany) Jessica Toledo Galvan	The Champions Club 2008	Bamberg, Germany	Decision (unanimous)	3	3:00	
Won IKBF European title.
July 2008	Loss	(Sweden) Nathalie Zoukatas	Sinbi Muay Thai Event	Ko Samui, Thailand	Decision (unanimous)	3	3:00	
October 27, 2007	Win	(Germany) Charlotte von Baumgarten	The Champions Club 2007	Bamberg, Germany	Decision	3	2:00	
Won WMC German title.
Legend: Win Loss Draw/No contest Notes

== Mixed martial arts record ==
Professional record breakdown
3 matches	3 wins	0 losses
By knockout	1	0
By submission	0	0
By decision	2	0

Res.	Record	Opponent	Method	Event	Date	Round	Time	Location	Notes
Win	3–0	Renáta Cseh-Lantos	Decision (unanimous)	Respect Fighting Championship 12	April 11, 2015	5	5:00	Wuppertal, Germany	Won the vacant RFC Flyweight Championship.
Win	2–0	Cinja Kiefer	TKO (punches)	MMA Bundesliga: It's Lanna Time 2	November 29, 2014	2	0:49	Bochum, Germany	
Win	1–0	Jana Lorenz	Decision (unanimous)	German MMA Championship 4: Next Level	July 6, 2013	3	5:00	Herne, Germany	
