= Moritz Heuberger =

German politician

Moritz Heuberger MdB

Member of the Bundestag; for Berlin-Tempelhof-Schöneberg
- Incumbent
- Assumed office 25 March 2025
- Preceded by: Kevin Kühnert

Personal details
- Born: 11 February 1991 (age 35) Heidenheim an der Brenz, Germany
- Party: Alliance 90/The Greens
- Education: University of Konstanz; University of Potsdam

Moritz Heuberger (born 11 February 1991) is a German politician belonging to the Alliance 90/The Greens. In the 2025 German federal election, he was elected to the German Bundestag.
