= SPD party member vote on the 2018 coalition agreement of Germany =

SPD membership vote on the 2018 German coalition agreement
February and March 2018
- Should the Social Democratic Party of Germany enter into the coalition treaty agreed with the Christian Democratic Union (CDU) and the Christian Social Union of Germany (CSU) in February 2018?
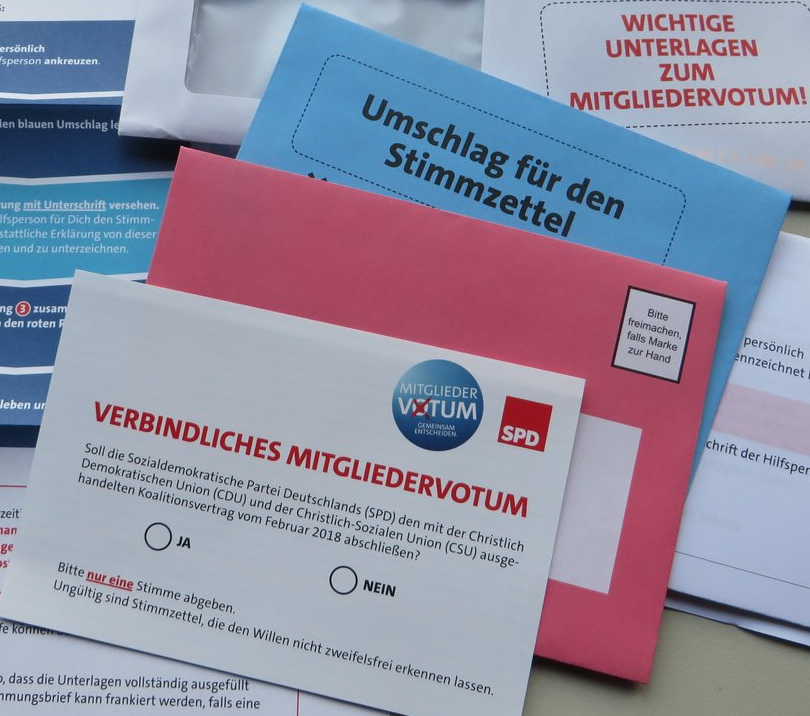
- Ballots and other documentation related to the vote

Results
Choice	Votes	%
Yes	239,604	66.02%
No	123,329	33.98%
Valid votes	362,933	95.90%
Invalid or blank votes	15,504	4.10%
Total votes	378,437	100.00%
Registered voters/turnout	463,723	81.61%

The SPD party member vote on the 2018 coalition agreement of Germany took place from 20 February to 2 March 2018. The membership of the center-left SPD decided via postal vote whether to accept a coalition agreement with Germany's center-right CDU and CSU. The result, 66.02% in favor of the Yes campaign, was published on 4 March 2018. It was decisive for Angela Merkel's plan to get re-elected as chancellor of Germany on 14 March in the German Bundestag.

== Background ==
From 2005, the SPD had been the junior partner in successive coalition governments led by Angela Merkel. After the German Federal elections in 2017 in which the SPD received only 20.5% of the vote, its worst result since the Second World War, SPD leader Martin Schulz ruled out any participation of his party in a new federal government with the CDU party of Angela Merkel. Even after the failed coalition talks between CDU, FDP, and Alliance 90/The Greens, the party board stuck to the decision. But, by late 2017, the attitude of the SPD's leadership had changed with its board voting in favor of exploratory talks in December that year. After the initial discussion's were successfully completed, the SPD entered formal coalition talks with CDU and CSU in January 2018. Martin Schulz had to step down after the coalition talks.

== Procedure ==
All SPD members received their election documents in the run up to 20 February 2018. All registered members on the 6 February 2018 at 6 p.m., (a total of 463,723) were eligible to vote. The question was: "Soll die Sozialdemokratische Partei Deutschlands (SPD) den mit der Christlich Demokratischen Union (CDU) und der Christlich-Sozialen Union (CSU) ausgehandelten Koalitionsvertrag vom Februar 2018 abschließen?" ("Should the Social Democratic Party of Germany enter into the coalition treaty agreed with the Christian Democratic Union (CDU) and the Christian Social Union of Germany (CSU) in February 2018?")

== Campaign ==
Several SPD politicians asked the party members to vote Yes, such as Andrea Nahles and Thomas Oppermann. Kevin Kühnert, chairman of the Jusos party youth organisation and the #NoGroKo (No Grand Coalition) initiative promoted the No campaign. Some SPD politicians such as SPD vice chairman Thorsten Schäfer-Gümbel feared extensive consequences for the party, in the case of a No vote. The Minister President of Lower Saxony, Stephan Weil, warned of a "phase of political instability" in the case of a No victory. Also, the German foreign minister Sigmar Gabriel urged his party "not to retreat into the study rooms". New Federal elections were seen by many observers as a possible result of a No vote, whilst a CDU minority government was considered a possibility by some.

== Result ==
The result was 66.02% in favor of the coalition agreement.

Eligible voters	Cast votes	Valid votes	Yes	No
463,723	378,437 (Turnout: 78.4%)	362,933	239,604 (66.02%)	123,329 (33.98%)
