= Doris Wagner (Bundestag) =

German politician (born 1963)

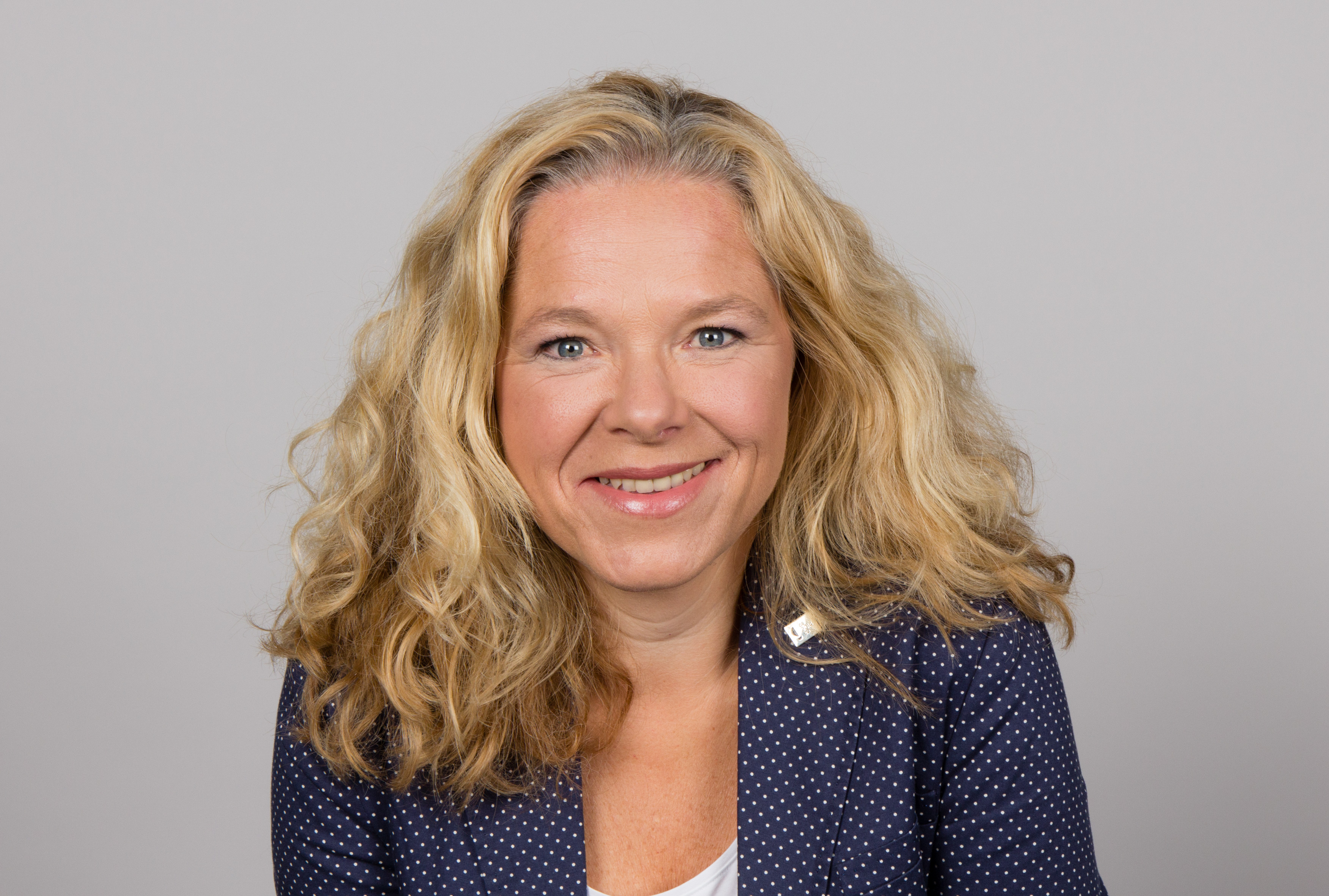
Doris Wagner in 2014.

Doris Wagner (born 28 January 1963) is a German politician from Alliance 90/The Greens. She was a Member of the Bundestag for Bavaria from 2013 to 2017.

== See also ==
- List of members of the 18th Bundestag
