= Florian Post =

German politician

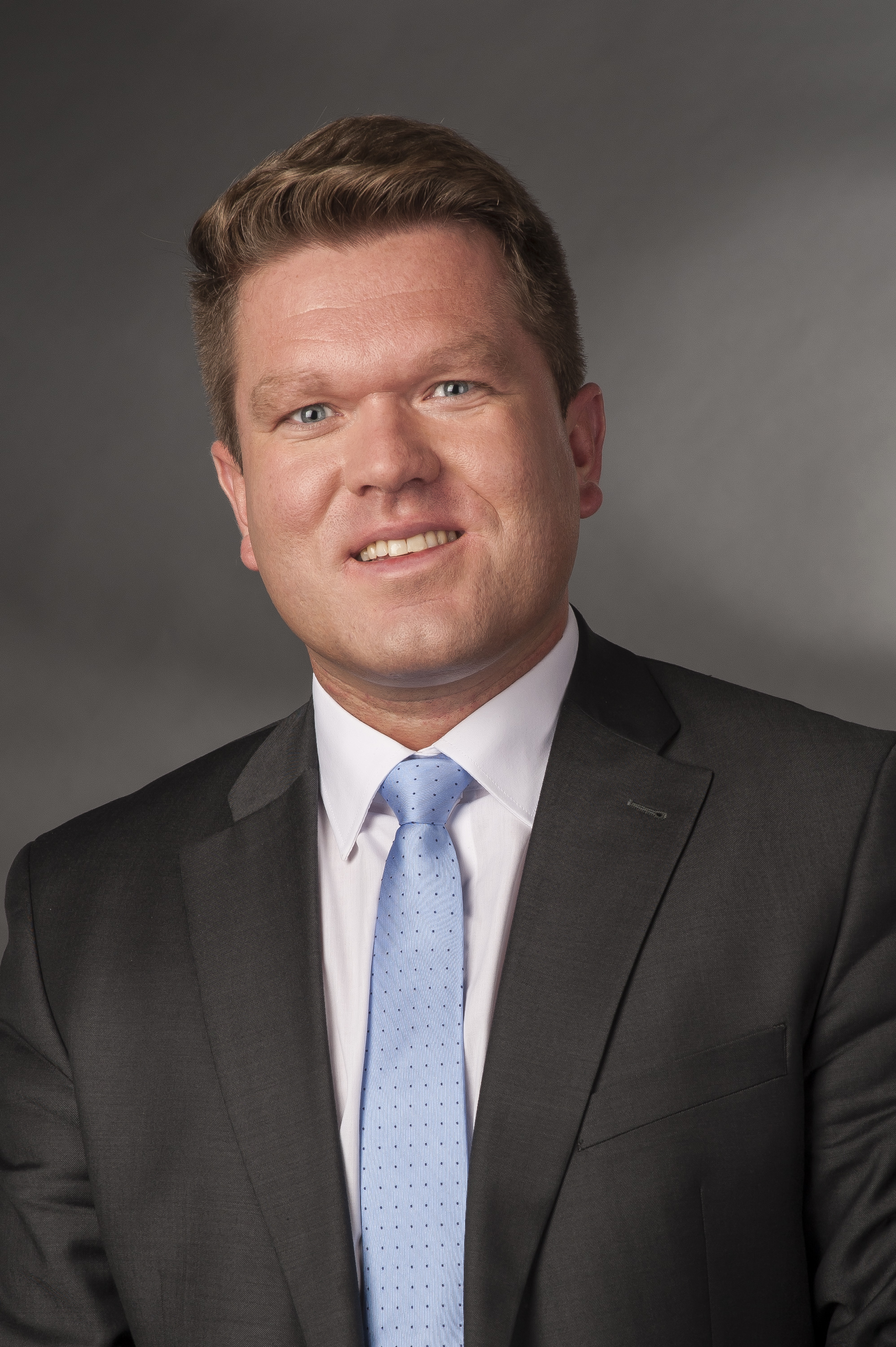
- Post in 2014

Member of the Bundestag
- In office 2013–2021

Personal details
- Born: 27 May 1981 (age 44) Neustadt an der Waldnaab, West Germany (now Germany)
- Party: SPD

Florian Post (born 27 May 1981) is a German politician who served as a member of the Bundestag from the state of Bavaria from 2013 to 2021. He was a member of the Social Democratic Party (SPD).

== Political career ==
Post became a member of the Bundestag in the 2013 German federal election. He was a member of the Committee on Legal Affairs and Consumer Protection until 2019.
