= Frank-Christian Hansel =

German politician (born 1964)

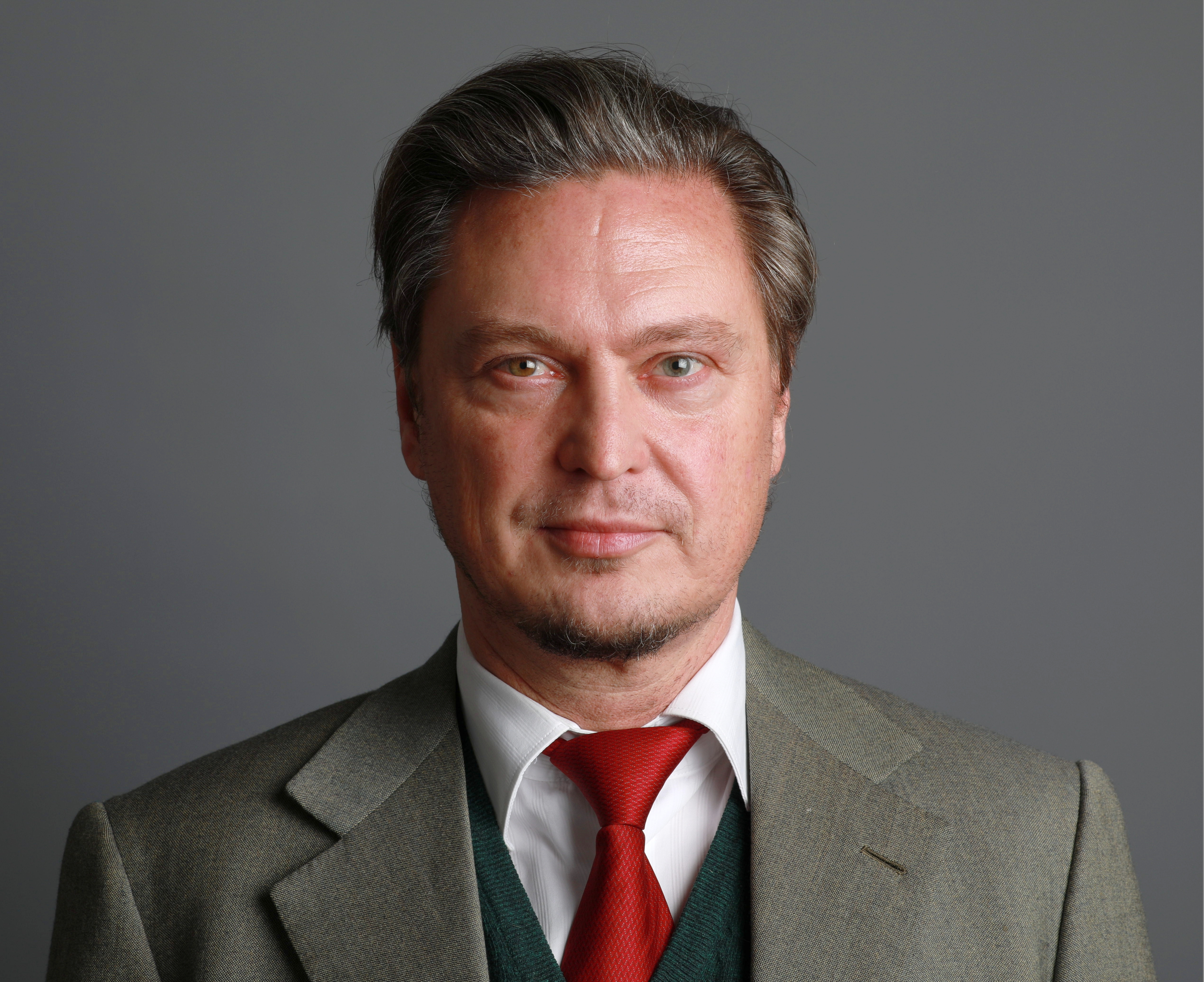
- Hansel in 2017

Member of the Abgeordnetenhaus of Berlin
- Incumbent
- Assumed office 27 October 2016

Personal details
- Born: 19 November 1964 (age 61) Wiesbaden
- Party: Alternative for Germany (since 2013)
- Other political affiliations: Social Democratic Party (1990–1995); Free Voters (2012–2013)

Frank-Christian Hansel (born 19 November 1964 in Wiesbaden) is a German politician serving as a member of the Abgeordnetenhaus of Berlin since 2016. From 2013 to 2014, he served as federal managing director of the Alternative for Germany.
