= Daniel Föst =

German politician (born 1976)

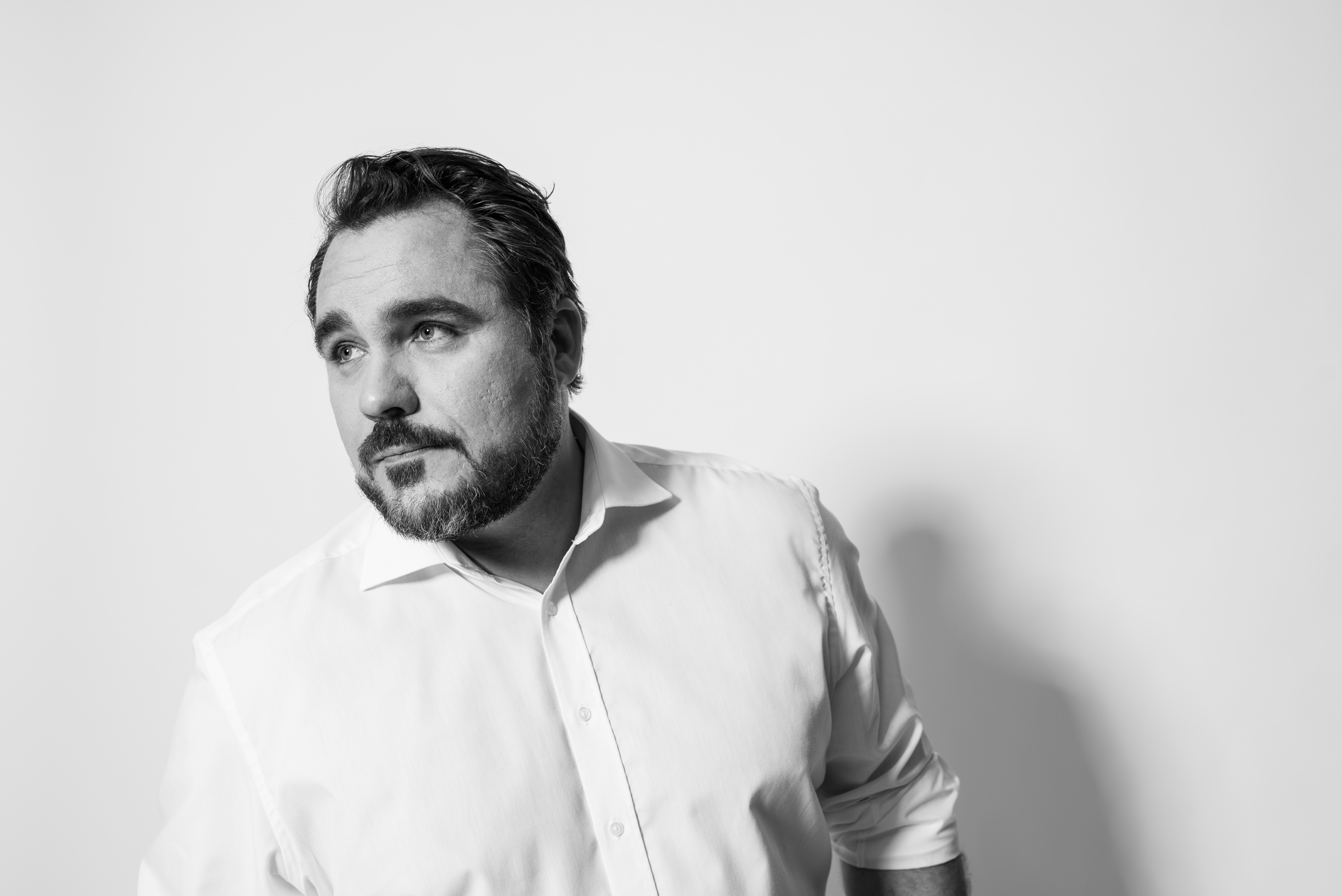
- Daniel Föst in 2017

Member of the Bundestag
- In office 2017–2025

Personal details
- Born: 10 August 1976 (age 50) Schweinfurt, Bavaria, West Germany
- Party: FDP
- Children: 2
- Education: University of Passau
- Occupation: Business economist

Daniel Föst (born 10 August 1976) is a German politician of the Free Democratic Party (FDP) who served as a member of the Bundestag from the state of Bavaria from 2017 to 2025.

== Early life and career ==
Föst was born in Schweinfurt. He attended the Rhön-Gymnasium in Bad Neustadt an der Saale, where he passed his school-leaving examination. After an apprenticeship as a salesman in the furniture retail trade in Hamburg, he studied business administration at the University of Passau.

From 1996 to 2005 Föst was head of Marketing & Communication at Opti Wohnwelt. From 2005 to 2006 he worked as a freelancer for various advertising and marketing agencies. From 2006 to 2016, Föst was a self-employed entrepreneur in the field of marketing and start-ups and was a lecturer at the vocational school teacher training course at the Technical University of Munich.

== Political career ==
Föst first became a member of the Bundestag in the 2017 German federal election. In parliament, he was a member of the Committee for Construction, Housing, Urban Development and Municipalities and the Committee for Family, Senior Citizens, Women and Youth. He also served as his parliamentary group’s spokesman for building and housing policy. In addition to his committee assignments, Föst co-chaired the German Parliamentary Friendship Group for Relations with the Maghreb States.

From 2017 to 2021, Föst served as chairman of the FDP in Bavaria.

In the negotiations to form a so-called traffic light coalition of the Social Democrats (SPD), the Green Party and the FDP following the 2021 federal elections, Föst led his party's delegation in the working group on building; his co-chairs from the other parties are Kevin Kühnert and Chris Kühn.
