= Johannes Singhammer =

German politician

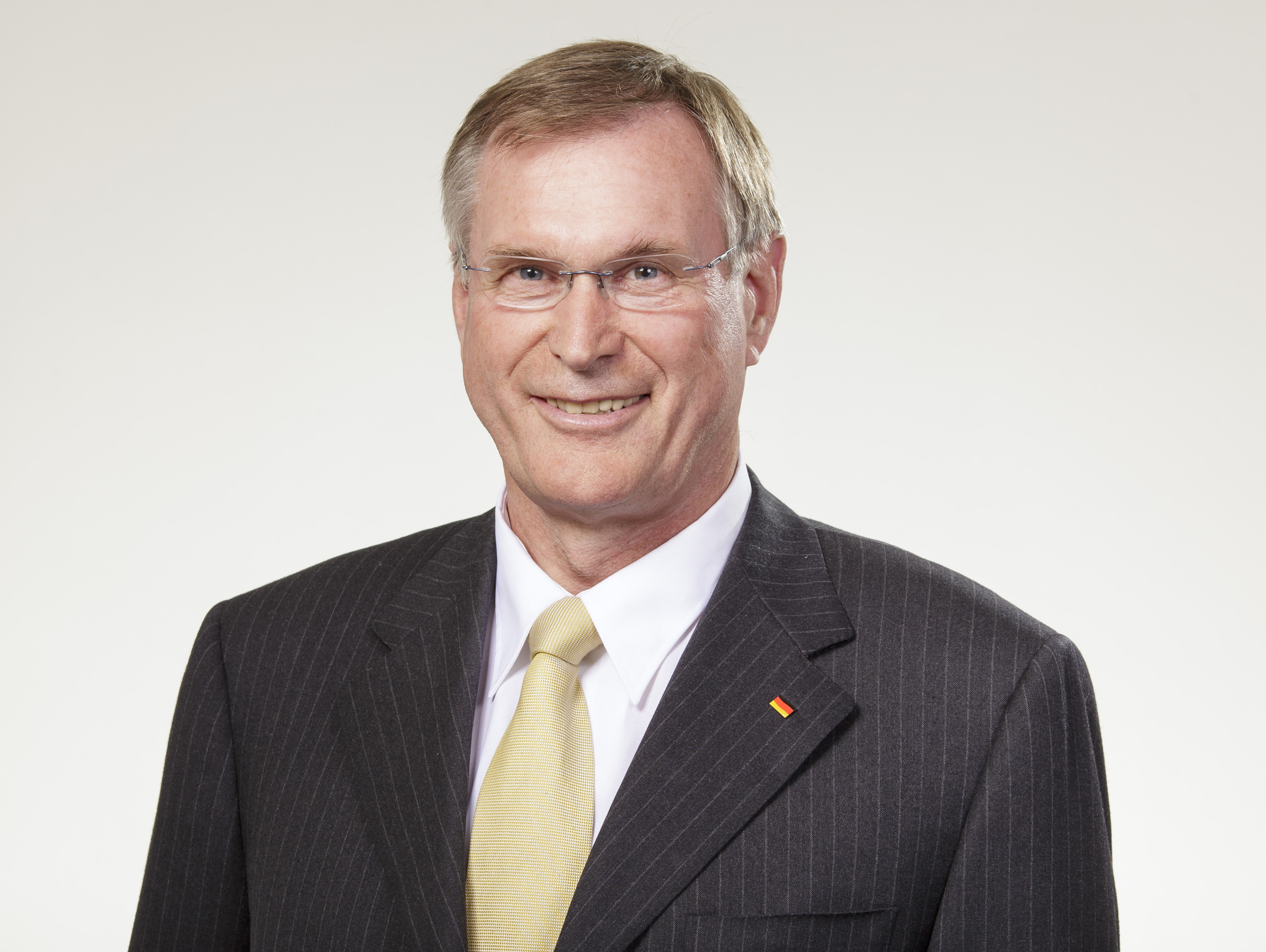
- Singhammer in 2012

Vice President of the Bundestag (on proposal of the CDU/CSU faction)
- In office 22 October 2013 – 24 October 2017
- President: Norbert Lammert
- Preceded by: Eduard Oswald
- Succeeded by: Hans-Peter Friedrich

Member of the Bundestag; from Bavaria
- In office 11 November 2005 – 24 October 2017
- Preceded by: Edmund Stoiber
- Succeeded by: Bernhard Loos
- Constituency: State list (2005–2009); Munich North (2009–2017)
- In office 10 November 1994 – 18 October 2005
- Preceded by: Fritz Wittmann
- Succeeded by: Multi-member district
- Constituency: Munich North (1994–1998); State list (1998–2005)

Personal details
- Born: 9 May 1953 (age 73) Munich, West Germany
- Party: Christian Social Union
- Children: 6
- Education: LMU Munich

Johannes Singhanmer (born 9 May 1953) is a German politician of the Christian Social Union (CSU). Between 2013 and 2017, he was one of the Vice-Presidents of the Bundestag.

== Political career ==
Singhammer has been a member of the Christian Social Union since 1972. He was first elected to the German Bundestag in the 1994 federal elections, as representative of the Munich North constituency. He initially served on the Committee on Labour and Social Affairs as well as on the Committee on Family Affairs, Senior Citizens, Women and Youth.

In the negotiations to form a coalition government following the 2013 federal elections, Singhammer was part of the CDU/CSU delegation in the working group on health policy, led by Jens Spahn and Karl Lauterbach.

In July 2016, Singhammer announced that he would not stand in the 2017 federal elections but instead resign from active politics by the end of the parliamentary term.

By late 2017, Singhammer commissioned a comprehensive report on the right of Poland to demand reparations from Germany for World War II. German parliamentary legal experts later found any claims related to German crimes had become unfeasible at latest in 1990 when a treaty was signed by East and West Germany, France, the Soviet Union, the United Kingdom, and the United States ahead of German reunification.

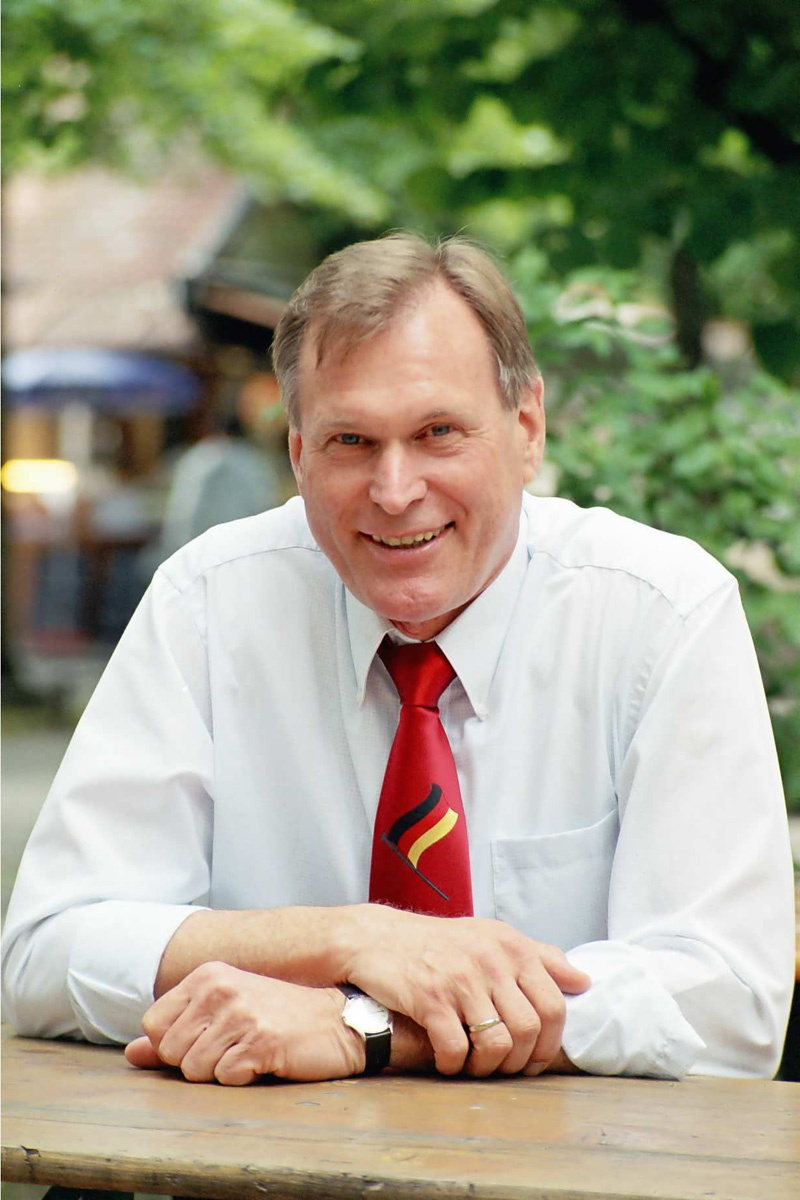
Singhammer in 2006

=== Regulatory bodies ===
- Federal Network Agency, Member of the Advisory Board (2005–2009)
- Regulatory Authority for Telecommunications and Posts (RegTP), Chairman of the Advisory Board (2002–2005)

=== Non-profits ===
- Hanns Seidel Foundation, Member
- Max Planck Institute of Psychiatry, Member of the Board of Trustees
- Deutsches Museum, Member of the Board of Trustees
- German-Mozambican Society, Member of the Advisory Board
- Haus der Geschichte, Member of the Board of Trustees (1998–2002)
