= Jan-Marco Luczak =

German lawyer and politician

Jan-Marco Luczak MdB
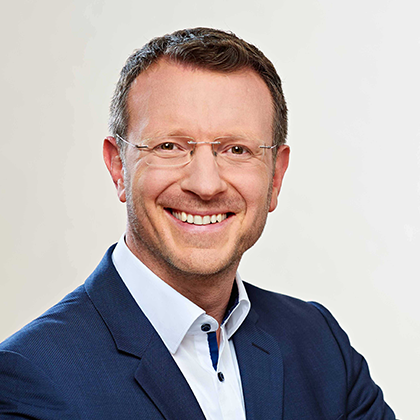

Member of the Bundestag; from Berlin
- Incumbent
- Assumed office 27 October 2009
- Preceded by: Mechthild Rawert
- Constituency: Berlin-Tempelhof-Schöneberg (2009–2021); State list (2021–present)

Personal details
- Born: 2 October 1975 (age 50) West Berlin, West Germany
- Party: Christian Democratic Union
- Children: 1
- Education: FU Berlin; LMU Munich
- Occupation: Lawyer
- Website: luczak-berlin.de

Jan-Marco Luczak (born 2 October 1975) is a German lawyer and a politician of the Christian Democratic Union (CDU) who has been serving as a member of the German Bundestag since 2009, representing the Berlin-Tempelhof-Schöneberg constituency until 2021, and as a party list member since.

== Early life and career ==
Luczak was born in West Berlin on 2 October 1975. He attended the secondary school Ulrich-von-Hutten-Gymnasium in Tempelhof and passed his Abitur in 1995, after which he served the general conscription in the Bundeswehr.

Moreover, Luczak began to study law at the Free University of Berlin. After his first Staatsexamen, Luczak worked for an international law firm. On a scholarship program of the Konrad Adenauer Foundation, he received the doctoral degree, Doctor of Laws, at LMU Munich. His dissertation ("Die Europäische Wirtschaftsverfassung als Legitimationselement europäischer Integration"; translated: The European economic constitution as the legitimated element of European Integration) was supervised by Rupert Scholz, a former German Minister of Defence. He passed the second Staatsexamen in 2008.

Since 2008, Luczak has been working as a lawyer for law firm Hengeler Mueller in Berlin.

== Political career ==
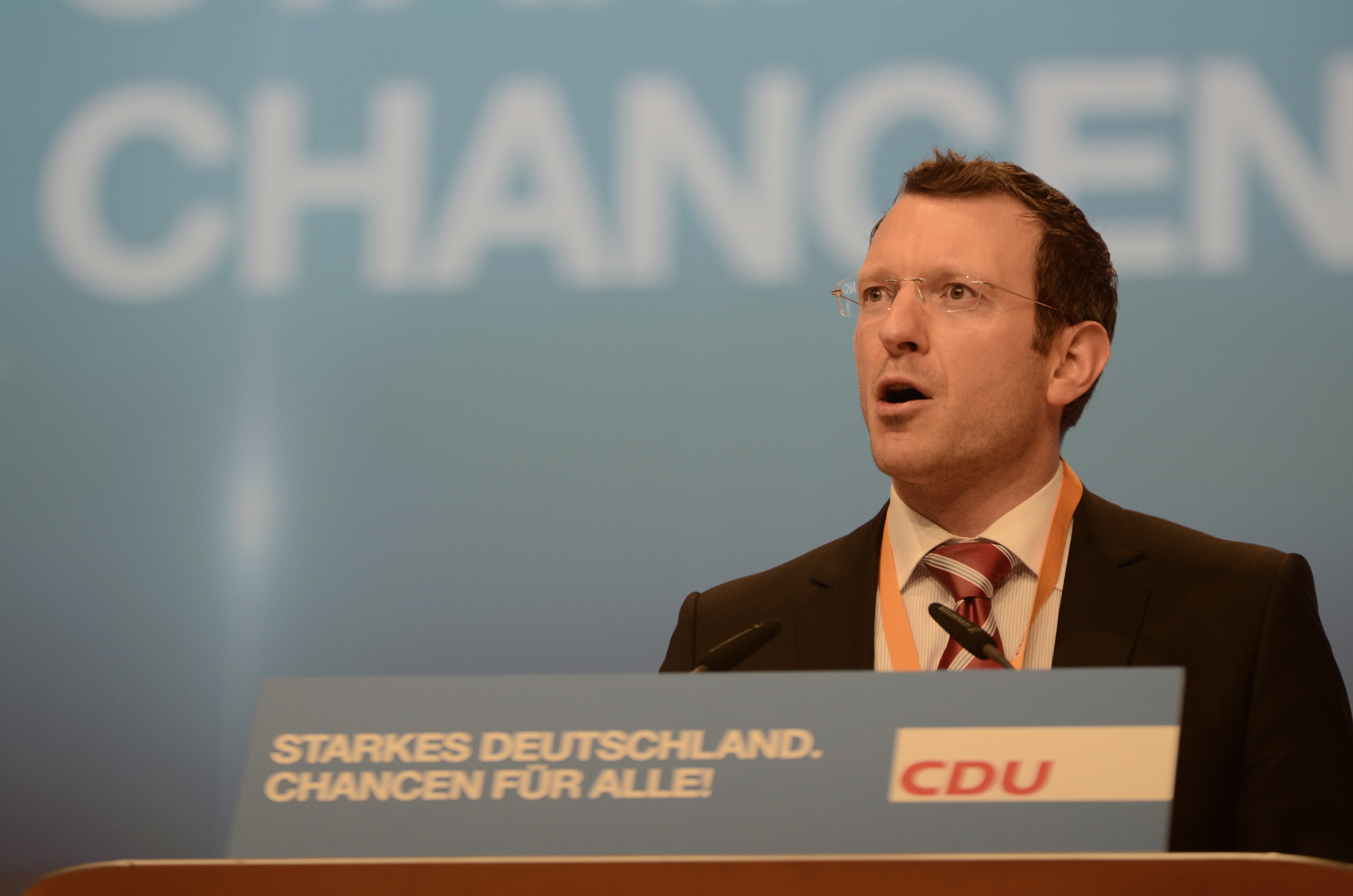
Jan-Marco Luczak at CDU Party Congress (2012)

Since 1998, Luczak has been a member of the Christian Democratic Union of Germany (CDU). He held several different offices, including treasurer and regional chairman of the youth organization "Young Union" of the Christian Democrats. Furthermore, Luczak has been elected for chairman of the local CDU in Berlin-Lichtenrade in 2006. He has been the deputy chairman of the regional CDU in district Tempelhof-Schöneberg since 2007.

=== Member of the German Bundestag (2009–present) ===
In the 2009 federal elections, Luczak ran for the direct Membership of Parliament (MP) in his electoral district Tempelhof-Schöneberg of Berlin. He won his electoral district with 32.4% (54,925 votes) of direct votes after 15 years for the CDU. In the elections of 2013 he defended his mandate with 35% (60,926 votes).

In parliament, Luczak served as a member of the Committee on Legal Affairs (2013–2021), the Sub-Committee on European Law (2013–2017) and as an alternate member of the Committee on Internal Affairs (2013–2021), where the majority of his work focused on legal affairs and economic policy. From 2014 until 2017, he was the deputy chairman of the Committee on Legal Affairs. He also served on the Committee on the Election of Judges (Wahlausschuss), which is in charge of appointing judges to the Federal Constitutional Court of Germany. Since the 2021 elections, he has been serving on the Committee on Building, Housing, Urban Development and Local Government. He is also his parliamentary group's spokesperson on building, housing, urban development and local government.

Within the CDU/CSU parliamentary group, Luczak led the group of CDU parliamentarians from Berlin from 2018 until 2021.

In addition to his committee assignments, Luczak is a member of the German Parliamentary Society. He was also a member of the German-French, the German-Polish and the German-American Parliamentary Friendship Groups before becoming deputy chairman of the Parliamentary Friendship Group for Relations with the Andes States (Bolivia, Ecuador, Colombia, Peru, Venezuela) in 2018.

In the negotiations to form a coalition government under the leadership of Chancellor Angela Merkel following the 2017 federal elections, Luczak was part of the working group on urban development, led by Bernd Althusmann, Kurt Gribl and Natascha Kohnen.

In the negotiations to form a coalition government between the CDU and the Social Democratic Party (SPD) under the leadership of Kai Wegner following Berlin’s 2023 state elections, Luczak was part of his party’s delegation to the working group on internal and legal affairs.

== Other activities ==
=== Corporate boards ===
- KfW, Member of the Board of Supervisory Directors (since 2025)

=== Non-profit organizations ===
- Deutschlandradio, Member of the Advisory Board
- Federal Foundation Magnus Hirschfeld, Member of the Board of Trustees
- Federal Network Agency for Electricity, Gas, Telecommunications, Post and Railway (BNetzA), Alternate Member of the Advisory Board (since 2014)
- Ernst Reuter Society e. V., Member
