= List of The Biggest Loser Australia episodes =

This is a list of episodes of all seasons of the Australian television series The Biggest Loser.

== Seasons ==
Season	Episodes	Originally aired
Season 1: 2006	53	2006
Season 2: 2007	68	2007
Season 3: 2008	74	2008
Season 4: 2009	74	2009
Season 5: 2010	66	2010
Season 6: 2011	53	2011
Season 7: 2012	72	2012
Season 8: 2013	34	2013
Season 9: 2014	33	2014

=== Season 1: 2006 ===
The first season averaged approximately 1,400,000 viewers, with the finale watched by 2,300,000.

Ep#/Wk-Ep#	Original airdate	Episode title / event	Total viewers (free-to-air rounded to nearest 1,000)
Week 1
1/01-1	Monday, 13 February	Series Premiere – Host Ajay Rochester welcomes 12 overweight contestants to the White House and to The Biggest Loser. Ajay reveals her own weight loss success and states that the Biggest Loser will win $200,000. The contestants are faced with their first mini-challenge – to move all the furniture into the house. The contestants are then faced with their Last Supper before they weighed in for the first time. The next day, the contestants line up outside wearing singlets with their name and weight on them. Trainers Bob Harper and Jillian Michaels of The Biggest Loser USA arrive and are shocked there are no Red and Blue teams and find out that they must choose their own teams. The trainers decide to get to know the contestants before making their decisions.	1,410,000
2/01-2	Tuesday, 14 February	Minor challenge (#1): Calorie Count – Jillian wins the coin toss and gets first pick. For her Red Team, she chooses Kristie, Shane, Ruth, David, Adro, and Jo. Bob chooses Cat, Wal, Tracy, Harry, Artie, and Fiona for the Blue Team. The contestants struggle into their first training session and learn about their diet before their first minor challenge. They go head-to-head and choose the plate of food they think has the lowest calories. Each face-off win would score a point for their team. The Red Team won 4–2, and the Blue Team are their slaves for 24 hours. Relationships begin to crack in between the teams.	—N/a
3/01-3	Wednesday, 15 February	Temptation (#1): Race to the Platters – The teams are woken early for an early training session, and David noticeably struggles as the largest contestant in the house. The Blue Team have started to crack as trust for Wal is low. The contestants arrive at an air hangar for their first temptation challenge, where they must race to one of six covered platters. Under the covers are various prizes: one holds a burger and chips, another a chocolate cake, others contain cash, one has an MP3 player, and one offers immunity. All members of the Red Team participate except for Shane, whereas nobody from the Blue Team participates. Kristie won $100, Adro won the burger and chips, David won the MP3 player, Ruth won immunity, and Jo won the chocolate cake.	—N/a
4/01-4	Thursday, 16 February	Major Challenge (#1): Sydney Harbour Bridge Climb – Jillian is not happy when the Red Team took temptation, but things get worse when Ruth believes she is pregnant. Fortunately, she tested negative and was able to stay in the competition. Bob treats his team to a training session on the beach as a reward for not giving in to temptation. The teams meet Ajay for the challenge to climb to the top of the Sydney Harbour Bridge the fastest with the winning team getting the choice of a brunch at Aqua Dining or a 2-hour swimming training session in the Sydney Olympic pool, the losers must take the option the winners declined and will get a 3 kg penalty at the weigh-in. David and Cat struggled on their respective teams-David needed oxygen after the red team completed the climb-but the Blue Team won by over 1 minute and chose the brunch.	—N/a
5/01-5	Friday, 17 February	Weigh-In (#1) – The teams go straight into the last chance workout before the weigh-in. The Blue Team won the weigh-in even without the 3 kg penalty that the Red Team incurred during the challenge. Kristie was the Biggest Loser of the week, losing 9.4 kg (8.94% of her body weight).	1,100,000
Week 2
6/02-1	Monday, 20 February	Elimination (#1): David - The Red Team are concerned about David's knee injury and vote him out of the game. The Blue Team confronted them in the gym afterwards, which aggravated Ruth. Bob and Jillian arrive to the White House and are impressed with their numbers, and Jillian respects the Red Team's decision to eliminate David. Bob leads his Blue Team through a yoga and meditation session while Jillian pushes her team in the gym, having a heart-to-heart with Shane about the death of his brother in a car accident. Two months on, David lost 15.8 kg, including 29 cm off his waistline. He has not had a cigarette or a beer since being on The Biggest Loser.	1,314,000
7/02-2	Tuesday, 21 February	Minor Challenge (#2): Pool Relay – The Blue Team begins to view Cat as the weakest member of their team, and Wal continues to manipulate the game. Bob and Jillian bring both teams into the media room to show them videos of encouragement from Seth Word, Suzy Preston, and Matt Hoover—the final three contestants from The Biggest Loser USA season 2. At the minor challenge, contestants must swim to the bottom of a pool, retrieve weights, and accumulate enough to match their team’s total weight loss on a scale. As the Blue Team has one extra member, they choose Cat to sit out and her weight loss was deducted from the Blue Team's total. The Red Team wins the challenge; their reward is a one-hour massage and the power to choose which Blue Team member must sit out of the major challenge.	1,100,000
8/02-3	Wednesday, 22 February	Bob's sudden departure & Phone calls home - Jillian arrives at the White House to deliver emotional news: Bob has had to return home due to the sudden passing of his mother from a heart attack. The news deeply affects the contestants. In Bob's absence, Jillian will take on the responsibility of training both teams. After the training session, each contestant is given a 10-minute phone call home.	1,100,000
9/02-4	Thursday, 23 February	Major Challenge (#2) – Truck Pull - With Bob still away, Fiona struggles during training. For the major challenge, the teams are taken to Oran Park Raceway, where they must pull a Mack truck 400 meters—one team member drives while the other four pull using ropes. As a result of winning the minor challenge, the Red Team chooses to sit out Wal from the Blue Team. The Blue Team ultimately wins the challenge, earning exclusive access to a Jacuzzi and the power to decide which of their members will sit out the upcoming weigh-in. Ajay also announces that the Biggest Loser on the losing team will receive immunity from elimination.	1,000,000
10/02-5	Friday, 24 February	Weigh-In (#2) - Jillian once again leads both teams through last chance training, reminding them that Week 2 is often known for low weight-loss numbers. During the week, Fiona is caught drinking custard and is confronted by her teammates for her lack of discipline. At the weigh-in, the Blue Team decides to sit Tracy out, leaving the Red Team stunned. Fiona shocks everyone when she gains 0.1 kg. Despite this, the Blue Team secures their second consecutive weigh-in victory with a total weight loss of 2.09%, compared to the Red Team’s 1.75%. Shane is named the Biggest Loser of the week with 3.17% weight loss, earning him immunity from elimination.	—N/a
Week 3
11/03-1	Monday, 27 February	Elimination (#2): Jo - The Blue Team celebrates their second weigh-in victory, though Fiona feels guilty about her weight gain. Meanwhile, tensions rise within the Red Team as they deliberate over the elimination. All of them admit they would have voted for Shane—had he not earned immunity. In the end, Jo is unanimously voted out, a decision that leaves the other two women visibly upset. Following the elimination, Harry lashes out at Ruth and Kristie, verbally attacking them and causing offense. The next day, Bob returns to the White House and opens up to his team about the loss of his mother. The team presents him with a condolence card, bringing him to tears. With renewed focus, both trainers push their teams even harder. Two months on, Jo has lost 16.5 kg and dropped three dress sizes.	1,264,000
12/03-2	Tuesday, 28 February	Minor Challenge (#3) – Soccer Match- At Aussie Stadium, the teams face off in a soccer match for the minor challenge, with Bob and Jillian as goalkeepers. Cat and Tracy sit out to even the numbers. Coached by Sydney FC's Mark Rudan (Blue) and Dwight Yorke (Red), and refereed by Pierre Littbarski, the Red Team wins 4–3, with all goals scored by Adro. Their prize: the power to move one Blue Team member to Red. They choose Wal.	1,000,000
13/03-3	Wednesday, 1 March	Temptation (#2) – Down The Garden Path - During Wal’s first training session with the Red Team, Jillian warns him not to stir up further drama. Meanwhile, the Blue Team holds a meeting where Harry accuses Wal of throwing the soccer match. At the next temptation challenge, Ajay greets the contestants at the White House and sends them down a garden path one by one, where they find a table with alcoholic drinks and a card that reads: “Drink a glass of your favourite beverage for a chance at immunity. Then follow the path you have chosen.” Tracy and Artie each drink a glass of champagne and choose the Immunity path, while all others resist. They are presented with meals ranging from 500 to 1,500 calories—only one meal contains exactly 1,000 calories. Tracy selects Thai fish cakes; Artie chooses beef curry with rice and papadams. Neither meal is correct—the 1,000-calorie dish was ham steak with coleslaw, so neither receives immunity.	1,100,000
14/03-4	Thursday, 2 March	Major Challenge (#3) – Racing hay bales - Bob makes Artie and Tracy pay for playing the temptation, while Jillian praised the Red Team for resisting. The major challenge required the teams to roll a 200 kg bale of hay across the field through a marked course in individual heats. Each heat lost resulted in a 0.5 kg penalty at the weigh-in. The Red Team won 4–1, winning letters from home as their prize. The Red Team enters the weigh-in with a 0.5 kg penalty, while the Blue Team has a 2 kg penalty.	—N/a
15/03-5	Friday, 3 March	Weigh-In (#3) - During last chance training, Bob lets Cat lead a spin class. At the weigh-in, the Blue Team loses 13.8 kg, but with a 2 kg penalty, their total weight loss drops to 1.81%. The Red Team loses 18.9 kg and, despite a 0.5 kg penalty, achieves a 2.76% loss for their first weigh-in victory. Wal is the Biggest Loser of the week with a 4.38% loss. Harry was the Biggest Loser on the Blue Team earned immunity.	—N/a
Week 4
16/04-1	Monday, 6 March	Elimination (#3): Cat - Cat grows increasingly anxious about the alliance between Fiona, Artie, and Tracy, fearing she will be eliminated. Harry tries to sway Artie to keep her, but his efforts fail, and Cat is voted out. Before leaving, Fiona, Artie, and Tracy explain their votes were based on friendship. Harry believes the team will not win another weigh-in without Wal or Cat. Tensions rise as the Red Team and Harry question the sincerity of Tracy’s tears, suspecting she no longer wants to be there. When the trainers return, Jillian is thrilled with her team’s win, while Bob is shocked by Cat’s elimination. Fiona later breaks down, feeling vulnerable as the smallest contestant on the Blue Team. Both teams train off-site, but the session is cut short when Artie is taken away in an ambulance with a suspected hamstring injury. Six weeks on, Cat has lost 27.2 kg and dropped three dress sizes. She is also planning to get married later this year.	1,233,000
17/04-2	Tuesday, 7 March	Minor Challenge (#4) – 4hr bike race - This week, contestants are restricted to takeaway meals, giving Bob and Jillian a chance to teach their teams how to make healthier choices when ordering. After 24 hours of rest and ice, Artie is cleared by medics to compete in the minor challenge: teams have four hours to pedal the furthest on a spin bike, with unlimited swaps. To determine who on the Red Team must sit out, both teams guess the calorie counts of a chocolate bar, chips, and a protein drink. The Blue Team guesses closest and chooses to bench Wal. The Blue Team pedals 138.7 km, beating the Red Team's 129.5 km. Their reward is a personal chef for the rest of the week, while the Red Team continues eating takeaway.	1,300,000
18/04-3	Wednesday, 8 March	Temptation (#3) – chocolates - Ajay presents the next temptation in the dining room: each contestant sits in front of a box of chocolates, with a hidden DVD message from home inside. The twist—whoever eats the most chocolates wins immunity but forfeits the chance to watch their message. Blindfolded for 15 minutes, only Fiona participates, eating 19 chocolates. Afterward, the teams watch their DVDs, and Bob expresses disappointment in the Blue Team for playing the game. He believes Harry is now at risk due to the alliance between Fiona, Artie, and Tracy. While the trio defend their actions to keep their place secure, Bob bluntly warns Harry that he will be eliminated if the team loses the next weigh-in.	—N/a
19/04-4	Thursday, 9 March	Major Challenge (#4) – 6,800 steps - Jillian takes the Red Team to Subway for another lesson on making smart takeaway choices while staying on track with their diets. At the major challenge, held at Concord Oval, contestants must complete 100 laps up and down the stadium’s 680 steps. Wal sits out after drawing the short straw. Shane falls ill during the challenge, requiring oxygen and vomiting, while Adro and Kristie grow emotional and are confronted by Jillian. The Blue Team wins, earning Samsung digital video cameras and the power to choose one Red Team member to sit out the upcoming weigh-in. The Red Team only manages 77 laps.	1,100,000
20/04-5	Friday, 10 March	Weigh-In (#4) - The Red Team returns home to find they have regained access to the refrigerator, ending their takeaway streak. Due to exhaustion from the challenge, Jillian pulls Kristie from the last chance workout. At the weigh-in, the Blue Team chooses Wal to sit out—but he had water-loaded and only lost 0.5 kg. The Red Team wins with a 2.35% combined weight loss, beating Blue’s 1.34%. Tracy breaks the 100 kg mark, weighing in at 98.6 kg. Shane is named Biggest Loser of the week with a 3.95% loss.	—N/a
Week 5
21/05-1	Monday, 13 March	Elimination (#4): Harry - After the Blue Team’s weigh-in loss, Harry feels vulnerable as the smallest loser and outsider to the alliance. The Red Team tries to persuade Fiona to vote out Tracy instead, but the effort fails—Harry is eliminated. On his way out, he says he hopes Wal or Kristie wins and insists no one from his team will. Ajay expresses surprise at their decision to eliminate their top performer, but the team leaves the elimination room smiling. While the Blue Team is away, the Red Team swaps their room belongings as a prank. The Blue Team is upset, with Fiona tearfully saying she felt violated. She, Tracy, and Artie threaten to quit and walk out of the house. The next day, the trainers arrive. Fiona hides under the blankets, refusing to speak on camera. Wal apologizes to Tracy and convinces her to stay. Eventually, all three return in blue shirts and speak with Bob—Fiona declaring she does not want to be a quitter. Ajay then gathers the contestants in the weigh-in room and announces that the teams are dissolved; the game will now continue in duos. Five weeks on, Harry has lost 31.4 kg and dropped from size 54 to size 38 jeans. His kids are proud of their dad.	1,399,000
22/05-2	Tuesday, 14 March	Secret Ballet – Ajay announces that the teams are officially dissolved and reformed into mixed-gender duos, with one pair to be eliminated at the end of the week. Contestants are ranked by total weight-loss percentage so far—Wal is the Biggest Loser, while Ruth ranks lowest. A secret ballot determines who will select the new duos, with contestants unable to vote for themselves. Wal receives three votes and earns the power to pair everyone up. He chooses: Artie & Tracy, Adro & Ruth, Shane & Fiona, and Wal & Kristie. At the end of the week, the two duos with the lowest weight-loss percentages will fall below the yellow line and face elimination.	1,100,000
23/05-3	Wednesday, 15 March	Temptation (#4) – card shark - With Jillian out sick, Bob trains all the contestants and learns about the new pairs. For the week’s temptation, the contestants head to the Hilton and sit at a blackjack table, where 12 cards are dealt—one of which grants immunity. Wal and Kristie do not play; Shane initially does not want to play, but he and Fiona ultimately decide to choose a card. Adro and Ruth win a one-hour massage, Artie and Tracy receive Kodak cameras, and Fiona and Shane draw the immunity card.	1,200,000
24/05-4	Thursday, 16 March	Major Challenge (#5) – Raft building - In a rainy challenge, contestants are strapped into life jackets and tasked with building a raft, then rowing it around a series of buoys on a lake. Fiona and Shane finish first, earning Mongoose mountain bikes and retaining their immunity. Kristie and Wal come in second, Ruth and Adro third, and Tracy and Artie finish last, receiving a 2 kg penalty at the weigh-in.	1,100,000
25/05-5	Friday, 17 March	Weigh-In (#5) - During the last chance workout, Bob and Jillian train all contestants together. Kristie is again sent to bed due to illness, and Fiona injures her ankle after falling off the cross-trainer, ending up on crutches. At the weigh-in, Fiona and Shane deliberately throw the weigh-in, gaining a combined 5.5 kg (+2.47%). Kristie and Wal win the weigh-in with a 2.24% combined loss. Ruth and Adro lose 0.61%, while Tracy and Artie lose just 0.13% (0.93% before their 2 kg penalty). Both duos fall below the yellow line, and the remaining contestants must vote individually to decide which pair is eliminated.	—N/a
Week 6
26/06-1	Monday, 20 March	Double Elimination (#5): Tracey & Artie / singles introduced - After the weigh-in, Tracy and Artie accept their likely elimination and pack their bags. Their suspicions are confirmed when Shane, Kristie, and Wal all vote them out. Following the elimination, tensions flare as Wal and Fiona argue, prompting an emotional Fiona to leave the lounge room. The next day, Bob and Jillian announce that the competition is now individual and they will train everyone together. The contestants are then surprised with makeovers and a Woman's Day photoshoot. Six weeks on, Artie has lost 36 kg and now fits into size 40 jeans, while Tracy has lost 20 kg and reached her goal of a size 14 dress.	1,200,000
27/06-2	Tuesday, 21 March	Makeover day and Minor Challenge (#6) – Putting the weight back on - The contestants excitedly leave the house for their makeover day, starting at the salon. Jillian joins to shave Shane’s beard before everyone heads to a Woman’s Day photoshoot, working with professional stylists. For the minor challenge, the contestants arrive at a track, where food displays represent the amount of weight they have lost so far (not to be eaten). They run one lap for a personal best time—Fiona sits out due to her ankle injury. In the second lap, they run again wearing weighted vests equal to their lost weight. The winner is the contestant whose second lap time is closest to their first. Adro wins the challenge with just a 2-second difference, earning an afternoon with his wife and daughter at Cottage Point.	1,100,000
28/06-3	Wednesday, 22 March	Temptation (#5) – cupcakes - The contestants enter a dark room filled with 102 cupcakes—representing the 102 kg collectively lost among the remaining six. Four cupcakes contain hidden immunity, but only those eaten count. They have 15 minutes to search, and if a cupcake is picked up, it must be eaten. Wal pressures Adro to play, and he ends up eating 11 cupcakes. Fiona eats 6, Wal 3, Kristie 2, while Ruth and Shane do not play. None of the 22 cupcakes eaten contain immunity, so no one is safe. Later, Bob and Jillian arrive at the house. Jillian angrily confronts Fiona and Adro, furious that Fiona may have wasted her advantage from throwing the previous weigh-in. Adro and Jillian clash when he claims her training style is not working for him, leaving both trainers frustrated.	1,100,000
29/06-4	Thursday, 23 March	Major Challenge (#6) – race up the dunes - At Palm Beach, the contestants face a sand dune challenge: in a single-elimination format, they must race uphill to grab a flag—the last person up is eliminated each round. After the first race, Ajay introduces a handicapper to assign staggered starting points to level the playing field. Fiona is eliminated first, followed by Shane, Adro, and Ruth. In a close final round, Wal narrowly beats Kristie to win the challenge. His reward is a $1,000 navigation system and the power to choose one contestant to weigh in 48 hours early—he selects Shane.	1,100,000
30/06-5	Friday, 24 March	Weigh-In (#6) - The episode opens with Shane’s early weigh-in, where he loses 5.9 kg—a 4.41% weight loss. Two days later, the remaining contestants weigh in. Fiona is the Biggest Loser of the week with an impressive 8.26% loss. Wal and Ruth fall below the yellow line and face elimination.	—N/a
Week 7
31/07-1	Monday, 27 March	Elimination (#6): Wal - The contestants face a tough decision: Wal is the biggest threat, but Ruth has openly said she wants to go home. In the end, Fiona, Kristie, and Adro vote Wal out—an outcome that does not surprise him. The next day, Bob and Jillian arrive at the house, and the contestants prank them into thinking both Wal and Shane were eliminated. When Shane appears, Jillian is thrilled to hear Wal is the one who has gone. The trainers later take everyone to the beach for an intense workout, where they push Ruth especially hard. Five weeks on, Wal has lost 51 kg and fits into his dream outfit. His wife has also lost 22 kg.	1,406,000
32/07-2	Tuesday, 28 March	Minor Challenge (#7) – Tonne of Bricks - After beach training, the contestants return to the house and are treated to beer and cake—a lesson in moderation. For the challenge, each contestant is given a tonne of bricks to move: unload their own pallet and reload a second one 25 meters away. Once finished, they can help others, but everyone must complete the task. Kristie finishes first, winning a $1,000 Bunnings Warehouse shopping spree—exciting for her, as her house is falling apart. Ruth finishes last and is placed under lockdown for 24 hours—no gym, no trainers, and no participation in the upcoming temptation. Though Kristie and Adro wanted to help her, they grow frustrated with her continued lack of effort and choose to let her fend for herself.	—N/a
33/07-3	Wednesday, 29 March	Temptation (#6) – Chinese fortune - Bob and Jillian return to the house and are surprised to learn about Ruth’s lockdown. Meanwhile, the remaining contestants are taken to Chinatown for a temptation challenge. They must select dishes from a yum cha trolley (and eat them), followed by a fortune cookie—only one of the 20 contains immunity. Shane chooses not to play, while Fiona, Kristie, and Adro each consume the maximum of five fortune cookies. Kristie wins immunity—earned from eating a chicken’s foot.	1,300,000
34/07-4	Thursday, 30 March	Major Challenge (#7) – A blinding maze wall climb - Ruth emerges from lockdown with a clearer mindset, and Jillian gives her a one-on-one training session he runs 10 miles per hour. The major challenge begins with a blindfolded maze—only the first three to finish will advance. Kristie recalls Fiona’s fortune cookie message from the temptation: “The solution to every labyrinth is in your left hand,” which helps her finish first. She then guides Fiona and Ruth through, eliminating Adro and Shane. In the second stage, the finalists must climb a 10-metre rock wall. Fiona rings the bell first, winning a watercraft and a 1 kg advantage at the weigh-in.	1,200,000
35/07-4	Friday, 31 March	Weigh-In (#7) - For the last chance workout, Bob trains the men while Jillian works with the women. Fiona is dismissed early due to painful blisters from the minor challenge, leaving her frustrated and emotional. At the weigh-in, Kristie water-loads and gains 6.89% of her body weight. Despite a 1 kg advantage, Fiona falls below the yellow line alongside Ruth. Shane is the Biggest Loser of the week with a 4.14% loss.	
Week 8
36/08-1	Monday, 3 April	Elimination (#7): Ruth - Following the weigh-in, Kristie, Adro, and Shane struggle with their votes. Kristie, torn between her early pact with Ruth and her growing respect for Fiona’s persistence, ultimately sides with Fiona. Adro votes for Fiona, while Shane and Kristie vote for Ruth, eliminating her in an emotional decision. After Ruth’s departure, Ajay announces a new rule: any contestant who gains weight will automatically face elimination—immunity or not. Fiona is relieved to still be in the game, while Adro is angry and withdrawn, feeling Kristie betrayed Ruth. The next day, Bob and Jillian arrive at the house. Both express concern over Kristie’s gameplay. The final four are then taken to Camp Eden, a health retreat in southern Queensland. Five weeks on, Ruth has lost 24 kg and dropped four dress sizes.	1,420,000
37/08-2	Tuesday, 4 April	Welcome to Camp Eden - At Camp Eden, the final four start their day with a chi gong class before heading out on a hike led by Bob. At the summit, he reflects on how far they have all come—especially Fiona. Back at the base, Jillian sits down with each contestant for one-on-one conversations about the emotional baggage that contributed to their weight gain, digging particularly deep with Kristie. To end the day, Bob leads a pool session to help the group unwind.	1,400,000
38/08-3	Wednesday, 5 April	Face Your Fears - At Camp Eden, the trainers take each contestant through a ropes course designed to challenge their fears and emotional barriers. Jillian guides Kristie to the flying fox to help her let go of her need for control—an experience Kristie ends up enjoying. Bob brings Fiona to the power pole, where she initially refuses to jump but eventually takes the leap. Jillian pushes Shane to rappel down a cliff in seven seconds; after a few tries, he conquers it in just five seconds. Finally, Bob leads Adro to the Brave Heart. Though Adro climbs it successfully, he initially refuses to jump. After several countdowns, he finally takes the plunge. Bob and Jillian leave the contestants for their final night before the super challenge.	1,500,000
39/08-4	Thursday, 6 April	Super Challenge – Ultimate Immunity - The contestants meet Ajay for their Super Challenge: a multi-stage race involving biking, kayaking, and running. Early on, Shane falls off his bike, breaking the chain. Adro slips into the water at the start of the kayaking leg but recovers to finish that segment first. In the final leg, Kristie pulls ahead in the run and wins the challenge, earning immunity for the second week in a row. Shane finishes last and, visibly frustrated, throws his helmet to the ground in anger.	1,300,000
40/08-5	Friday, 7 April	Weigh-In (#8) - Back at the White House, the contestants reunite with Bob and Jillian for their final last-chance training. The session is tough, as everyone battles exhaustion and homesickness. Later, Shane and Adro meet at the pool and make a pact to support each other. At the weigh-in, Fiona gains 0.8 kg—her third gain of the competition—automatically placing her below the yellow line. Shane joins her with a 2.28% loss. Kristie was the Biggest Loser of the week for the second time, with an impressive 8.85% loss.	
Week 9
41/09-1	Monday, 10 April	Elimination (#8): Shane - After the weigh-in, Kristie is firm in her decision, while Adro struggles with his vote due to his pact with Shane. A split vote would mean Fiona’s elimination. However, Kristie convinces Adro that Shane poses the greatest threat, and he ultimately joins her in voting Shane out of the game. That night, the remaining contestants return to their rooms to find DVDs of their audition tapes waiting on their beds. They watch them together, reflecting on how far they have come. Afterwards, they try on their old clothes, amazed at how loose they now fit. When Bob and Jillian arrive at the White House, Jillian is visibly disappointed not to see Shane. Fiona breaks down in tears, fearing Bob’s reaction to her weight gain. Later, Ajay meets the final three outside the house for one last surprise: the eliminated contestants have returned.	1,600,000
42/09-2	Tuesday, 11 April	Eliminated contestants weigh in - Ajay announces that the eliminated contestants have returned to compete for a wildcard spot in the final week of the competition. Tracy declined the invitation and does not return. The finalists react with mixed emotions—Adro is angry, and Fiona is visibly nervous. The returning contestants are weighed against their last weigh-in prior to elimination. Wal, having water-loaded, gains 0.7 kg and is immediately disqualified from re-entering the competition.	1,421,000
43/09-3	Wednesday, 12 April	Eliminated contestants settle in - Bob and Jillian arrive at the house and are surprised—and frustrated—to see the eliminated contestants back. Both trainers express that the twist feels unfair to the final three. Bob trains the eliminated players separately, though Cat refuses to participate in the hill run. Back at the house, tensions rise when Jo confronts Kristie over rumors that Kristie feels threatened by her. Meanwhile, Bob trains the finalists and urges them to stay focused, taking them on a long run to clear their heads. Jillian makes her stance clear: her loyalty remains with the finalists.	1,316,000
44/09-4	Thursday, 13 April	Eliminated contestant Super Challenge - Jillian pulls Cat aside from training, where Cat opens up about her unhealthy relationship with food and admits she has not been eating enough. For the wildcard challenge, the eliminated contestants ride quad bikes to a 3 km sand dune course, with dunes reaching up to 30 meters high. After completing the run, they must choose one of seven food items—the three with the lowest-calorie selections will return to the house; the others will be eliminated. David is unable to finish due to a knee injury and is escorted out by medics. Harry finishes first and selects the second-lowest calorie item—a can of tomatoes. Jo finishes second and chooses the lowest-calorie option—blackcurrant juice. Despite finishing last, Cat picks the third-lowest item—a can of tuna—securing the final spot back in the house. Artie, Shane, and Ruth are eliminated once again. Back at the house, Bob takes the finalists out to lunch to discuss who they think might return. Fiona is torn between Jo and Harry, Kristie suspects Shane, while Adro hopes it is not Shane or Harry—Bob agrees, noting Harry is the biggest threat. At the end of the episode, we catch up with Shane 4 weeks on; he has lost 43 kg and gone from size 52 jeans to size 39.	1,500,000
45/09-5	Friday, 14 April	Weigh-In (#8) - Harry, Jo, and Cat return to the house ahead of last chance training. Bob trains the wildcard hopefuls, while Jillian focuses on the final three. During her session, Fiona breaks down, feeling unworthy. At the wildcard weigh-in, Jo loses 2.26% of her weight, Cat loses 0.69%, and Harry dominates with a 7.25% loss—securing his return to the competition. Ajay presents him with a black shirt, marking his place in the final four. Adro, Fiona, and Kristie remove their black shirts and step back as he rejoined them. Ajay then reveals to the final 4 that the final weigh-in will be based on each contestant’s total percentage of weight loss since the beginning of the competition.	—N/a
Week 10
46/10-1	Monday, 17 April	Harry returns - Bob is happy to see Harry back in the game, but Jillian is not, leading to a tense confrontation between her and Harry. All contestants are angry and unsettled, especially the two men. To ease tensions, Bob speaks with Adro and Harry one-on-one, while Jillian checks in with Kristie and Fiona. During training, Bob pushes Adro to his physical and emotional limits, bringing him to tears. Later, Harry calls Adro into his room for a private conversation. Adro ultimately comes to terms with Harry’s return, recognizing that he has to accept it and refocus on the game.	—N/a
47/10-2	Tuesday, 18 April	Dream outfits - Kristie, Adro, and Fiona decide to run up the hill to the White House—a hill they could barely walk on day one—now finding it easy, a clear sign of how far they have come. Tensions with Harry have eased, and the group feels united again. Professional boxer Jeff Fenech visits the gym to train the final four, leaving them motivated and inspired. Later, the contestants try on their dream outfits—and they all fit. To celebrate, they invite Bob and Jillian over for lunch as a thank-you. When the trainers arrive, they are surprised and touched to see everyone in their dream outfits—except Kristie. Jillian, disapproving of her outfit, pulls her upstairs to change before lunch is served.	1,500,000
48/10-3	Wednesday, 19 April	Inspiring others - Ajay greets 50 people at the White House gate and escorts them into the Secret Garden. Bob, Jillian, and the final 4 all greet them. Each finalist writes a speech and shares words of inspiration to the crowd.	1,400,000
49/10-4	Thursday, 20 April	Train the trainers and final weigh-in - The finalists receive messages of encouragement from home before Bob and Jillian arrive at the house. To their surprise, it is "Train the Trainer Day"—each contestant gets to put Bob and Jillian through a one-hour workout before their own last chance training. During the session, Harry experiences a drop in blood pressure and is sent to the medic for evaluation. At the weigh-in, Kristie (who has immunity) loses 23.19% total weight, Adro loses 24.84%, and Fiona loses 19.49%, falling below the yellow line. Harry steps up to the scales as the episode ends, needing a 44.5 kg loss to be safe.	1,400,000
50/10-5	Friday, 21 April	Final Elimination: Adro - Harry steps up to the scales last, needing to have lost 44.5 kg to avoid falling below the yellow line. He loses 46.5 kg, or 25.99%—putting him in first place overall. With Kristie's immunity securing her spot in the finale despite finishing third, Adro is pushed below the yellow line alongside Fiona. Neither feels confident. Adro retreats straight to his room, devastated and angry, feeling he has let down his wife and daughter. Kristie follows to comfort him, and Harry joins soon after. Fiona later speaks privately with Harry before the elimination vote—he admits he has not made up his mind. (If it had been a tie, Fiona would have gone home.) Ultimately, both Kristie and Harry vote for Adro, ending his journey in the competition. After his departure, Ajay announces that the remaining three contestants—Harry, Kristie, and Fiona—will head home the next day to prepare for the live finale. When Bob and Jillian return to the house, they are disappointed to see Adro gone but proud to see two women in the final three for the first time. They bring the finalists into the gym for a final reflection, showing them cutouts of their former selves—a powerful visual reminder of how far they have come.The finalists say their emotional goodbyes to Bob, Jillian, and each other, then leave the White House for good. Four weeks on, Adro has lost 37 kg and proudly fits into size 36 jeans.	—N/a
Week 11
51/11-1	Wednesday, April 26	Finalists Go Home, and the Final Four - Bob and Jillian express frustration that Harry was allowed to take vitamins while at home, calling it an "unfair advantage". In response, Ajay heads to Adro's house, bringing him back as part of the final four. The episode shifts to a retrospective as the journeys of Adro, Harry, Kristie, and Fiona are revisited. Bob, Jillian, and several eliminated contestants reflect on each finalist’s growth, challenges, and resilience throughout the competition. Meanwhile, the eliminated contestants receive a letter announcing that they will all weigh in at the finale, and the one with the highest overall percentage of weight loss will win $50,000, sharing what they would do with the prize money and who their biggest threats will be.	
52/11-2	Friday, 28 April	Live Finale - In a two-hour live finale filmed in front of a studio audience, all 12 contestants returned to the stage. Bob and Jillian joined the event remotely from Los Angeles. Shannon Noll performed "Lift", the theme song of the show. The eliminated contestants weighed in first. With a total weight loss of 37.52%, Wal was revealed as the winner of the $50,000 eliminated contestant prize. In a heartfelt moment, he announced that he would donate half of his winnings to the burns unit at Westmead Hospital in New South Wales. Next, the final four took the stage for their final weigh-ins: Fiona lost 29.18%, placing 4th and earning $10,000.; Kristie lost 36.93%, finishing third and winning $20,000.; Harry lost 37%, finishing second, and taking home $30,000.; Adro was crowned The Biggest Loser, with a total loss of 51.3 kg, or 37.58% of his body weight. He won the grand prize of $200,000 and a home gym.	2,310,000
53/11-3	Sunday, 30 April	Special: Secrets of The Biggest Loser - Following the emotional finale, a special episode titled "Secrets of The Biggest Loser" aired, reuniting all 12 contestants along with host Ajay Rochester. Filmed in front of a live studio audience, the special offered a behind-the-scenes look at life in the house, including diet plans, training routines, unaired footage, and audience Q&A.	—N/a

=== Season 2: 2007 ===
Ep#/Wk-Ep#	Original airdate	Episode title / event	Total viewers (free-to-air rounded to nearest 1,000)
Week 1
1/01-1	Sunday, 4 February	Season Premiere – Season 2 begins with 14 contestants making the walk to the newly upgraded Biggest Loser White House, where they are greeted by host Ajay Rochester. Before entering, they are blindfoled and driven to their Last Supper, full of unhealthy food. Alex challenges Michael to an eating contest, which ends with Michael vomiting. Their humiliation grows when a giant screen drops, replaying footage of them eating. The contestants then arrive at the house for the first weigh-in. The group's combined weight is nearly 2 metric tonnes, and Damien sets a record for the heaviest contestant ever at 216.3 kg. Afterwards, they are shown their dream outfits before heading to bed-with Alex struggling to find a roommate due to his sleep apnea, and some contestants already homesick. The next morning, the contestants line up outside in weight order (smallest to largest) wearing singlets with their names and weights. They are shocked to see 2 brand new Australian trainers: Shannan Ponton and Michelle Bridges, who interview the contestants before they choose their teams. Shannan's team consists of Mel, Kelly, Jules, Sam, Gerard, Michael, and Damien. Michelle's team consists of Pati, Munnalita, Courtney, Greg, Sarah, Alex, and Marty. Once the teams are formed, the gates open again to reveal Bob and Jillian, each holding T-shirts in their team colors. Bob throws his blue shirt into the air as the episode cuts to black.	1,170,000 (peaking at 1.45m)
2/01-2	Monday, 5 February	Minor Challenge #1 – Movie Madness – Shannan caught Bob's blue T-shirt, so he and Bob train the Blue Team, while Michelle and Jillian train the Red Team. The first training session was brutal-Greg vomited, several contestants cried, and Gerard fainted. Despite that, everyone finished exhausted, yet proud. The trainers then followed up with a nutrition lesson. The next day, the contestants were told to pack an overnight bag before heading to the Cremorne Orpehum for their first minor challenge. Ajay called up one player from each team, spun a wheel to select a seat number, and sent them racing to that seat in the cinema. There, they had to choose the lower-calorie option between two foods; each correct pick earned a point for their team. The Blue Team swept the challenge 4–0, winning massages, while the Red Team's penalty was to camp outside with no access to the house for the night.	1,077,695
3/01-3	Tuesday, 6 February	Sarah Quits – The Red Team returned to the White House to find their swags on the lawn, while the Blue Team headed straight to the gym. An ambulance arrived unexpectedly, taking someone away on a stretcher. When Bob and Shannan arrived, they were pleased to see their team training but shocked to learn Gerard was missing — he was in hospital, and the medic could not say why. Kelly struggled to focus, worried about him. Later, Shannan called Gerard and learned he would be okay, sharing the news with his relieved teammates over dinner. Meanwhile, the Red Team decided to train without their trainers, though Sarah did not participate. Michelle found her sitting alone, upset and admitting she wanted to go home. Jillian told Michelle to let her leave, believing she could not help someone unwilling to be helped. Despite Michelle’s encouragement, Sarah chose to leave the house and the game, saying goodbye to the contestants and wishing them well.	—N/a
4/01-4	Wednesday, 7 February	Temptation #1 – Secret Service – In the first training session without Sarah, Alex twists his ankle while working with Jillian, leaving some members of the red team to question his work ethic. Gerard returns from hospital, delighting the Blue Team but worrying him as he fears he will be eliminated first. Bob and season 1 contestant Cat White visit Sarah at home to once again convince her to return, but she declined. It was revealed that she has lost 8 kg, exercising regularly, and has improved her diet. The first temptation saw contestants in team-coloured booths, with a waiter bringing them plates of food with increasing calories. The last person to eat would win immunity. The first plate was a 17-calorie slice of watermelon. The Blue Team stuck to a pact not to play, while Greg, Marty, and Courtney ate. The second plate was a 284-calorie bowl of potato wedges with sour cream and sweet chilli sauce. Greg and Marty refused, so Courtney, in the last stall, secured immunity. Ajay then revealed a new twist: each immunity winner must face The Walk.	1,069,000
5/01-5	Thursday, 8 February	The Walk #1 – Courtney – The trainers arrive at the White House after the temptation. Jillian was surprisingly not upset with 3 of her men for playing, while Bob and Shannan were proud of their Blue Team for resisting. Bob and Shannan both trained Gerard individually, and he walked out of the gym both times. On the Red Team, Courtney slacks off because he has immunity. Jillian trains him to the point where he too walks out, leaving his teammates frustrated. On the first Walk of the series, Courtney meets Ajay and four stone vessels, each filled with water and containing a tablet with a different twist: Pick another contestant to have 24 hours of exclusive training with one of their trainers; You must choose one member of the Blue Team to sit out of the next major challenge; Swap a Red Team member with a Blue one; Give your immunity to another contestant; He chose the first tablet, selecting Alex to train with Jillian.	876,000
6/01-6	Friday, 9 February	Major Challenge #1 – Sydney Tower Race - The teams arrive at Hyde Park for their major challenge. Before the event began, they faced a calorie-counting task to determine which Blue Team member would sit out: whoever guessed closest to the calories in a cheese and cracker snack would win the choice. The Red Team came closest and chose to bench Mel. Ajay then met the teams on the Skywalk of Sydney Tower, where they stood on the edge of a glass platform 268 metres above the ground. Each team had to complete 50 laps around the platform, with each player leading for 8 laps and writing their name and target weight loss on the platform when they finished their turn. Alex struggled, requiring oxygen after the Red Team had finished, but did not want to let the team down. The Blue Team ended up winning, finishing 3 minutes and 43 seconds ahead of the Red Team. They chose a fine dining meal as their reward, while the Red Team were left with a dragon boat training session with the Australian national team and a 5 kg penalty at the weigh-in.	—N/a
Week 2
7/02-1	Sunday, 11 February	The Weigh-in #1 – After the challenge, the Red Team headed to their rowing session while the Blue Team used their nutrition knowledge at the restaurant. Back at the house, the trainers share video messages of encouragement from season 1's final 4-Adro, Kristie, Harry, and Fiona. Alex confides with Jillian that he feels like the weakest link on the Red Team, but impressed her during last chance training. Michelle trains the remaining Reds with Marty falling and hurting his leg. Before the weigh-in, the teams are faced with a 5 km rowing race to determine which team earns the right to choose who from the Blue Team will sit out of the weigh-in. Marty represented Red, and beat former elite rower Mel for Blue, choosing Damien to sit out for the Blue Team. At the weigh-in, the Red Team posted a 5.87% loss, reduced to 5.29% after their 5 kg penalty. Sam was escorted out mid-weigh-in with a leg injury. The Blue Team, competing without Damien, lost 5.44% to win the weigh-in. Mel, the lightest contestant, was the Biggest Loser of the week with a 7.10% loss.	1,258,000
8/02-2	Monday, 12 February	Elimination #1 – Alex / Sam Withdraws – The Red Team is crushed after losing the weigh-in, especially since the 5 kg penalty cost them the win. Alex, the Red Team’s Biggest Loser, is blamed for losing the challenge and is eliminated. Jillian is furious, scolding Courtney for his role, and pulls Michelle aside, emphasizing her focus should be on contestants fully committed to the game. Bob and Shannan celebrate their Blue Team’s numbers, but the mood sours when Sam returns to announce she has deep vein thrombosis and withdraws on medical advice. Both teams participate in a rugby workout, with Jillian pushing Courtney to his limit, followed by a friendly scrum machine contest where the Red Team beats Blue for the first time. Two months on, Sam has lost 20.3 kg (size 16), and Alex has lost 28.2 kg and is no longer borderline diabetic.	1,204,000
9/02-3	Tuesday, 13 February	Minor Challenge #2 – Beach Volleyball - Kelly sustained a grade 2 calf tear during the rugby training, limiting her ability to work out. On the red side, Jillian focuses on Marty. The teams arrived at Manly Beach for their minor challenge, a beach volleyball match. The Red Team opted to sit Michael out from the Blue Team, and Michelle and Shannan played with their team. In a very close match, the Red Team won 2 sets to 1, receiving a calorie-controlled 3-course gourmet meal as their reward. For their penalty, the Blue Team must eat frozen dinners for 24 hours, upsetting Kelly and Gerard the most.	993,000
10/02-4	Wednesday, 14 February	Temptation #2 – The Circle of Pizza – After enjoying their catered dinner, the Red Team’s morale soars, while the Blue Team feels like underdogs after struggling with frozen meals. At temptation, contestants face a 24-inch pizza with flags—one for immunity, one for a flat-screen TV. If no one played, Courtney would keep his immunity from last week. Gerard breaks the Blue Team’s pact by playing, grabbing one flag without eating. This pattern repeats with a 12-inch pizza (Gerard grabbed 2 flags), and finally a 6-inch pizza, which Gerard eats all 520 calories of, claiming all eight flags and winning both prizes plus the Walk. His teammates are frustrated by the betrayal, while Gerard insists he felt vulnerable and apologizes repeatedly.	—N/a
11/02-5	Thursday, 15 February	The Walk #2 – Gerard – 2 New Contestants - After the temptation, Bob and Shannan confront the Blue Team about Gerard’s decision to break their pact and warn them about the strategic risks of the Walk. On the Walk, Gerard meets Ajay and four prospective replacements for Sarah and Sam—Laura, Kelli, P’eta, and Jess. Faced with four water vessels, he selects two, bringing Laura and P’eta into the competition and sending Kelli and Jess home. The contestants are confused to be called into the weigh-in room, and then shocked to see two new contestants on the other side. Laura and P’eta weigh in for the first time and are granted immunity for their first week. The ladies settle in for their first night while the teams discuss which player they would rather have on their team.	1,047,000
12/02-6	Friday, 16 February	Major Challenge #2 – Plane Pull – While the teams head to the challenge, Shannan and Michelle arrive to the White House, shocked to see two new contestants. They jump right into training them, with P'eta breaking down. The major challenge saw the teams pull a 9 tonne plane 150 metres down the tarmac. At the designated stopping points, one team member must run onto the plane and collect their own luggage which contained 10% of their body weight and a letter from home, which they must drop off to the end of the track. The winning team gets to choose which of the new contestants join their team and read their letters. The Red Team chose to sit Michael out once again from Blue, and Bob and Jillian are there to cheer on their teams. Most of the way, the Red Team were in the lead until one of the ropes got caught underneath a wheel. The Blue Team took advantage of that to surge ahead and win the challenge, receiving their letters and leaving the Red Team devastated.	—N/a
Week 3
13/03-1	Sunday, 18 February	The Weigh-in #2/Bob and Jillian Leave – After returning from the challenge, the Blue Team selected P’eta to join them, leaving Laura with the Red Team. Bob and Jillian led their final training sessions before heading back to America and handing training duties to Shannan and Michelle. To decide which Blue Team member would sit out the weigh-in, a head-to-head 10 km bike race was held between P’eta (Blue) and Courtney (Red). Courtney won, giving the Red Team the power to choose, and they sat Mel out. Mel dropped under 100 kg, weighing in at 98.7 kg. The Red Team posted a 2.83% total loss, while the Blue Team lost 2.44% without Mel (2.39% including her), so the Red Team won the weigh-in. Newcomer Laura was the week’s Biggest Loser with a 3.66% loss.	898,000
14/03-2	Monday, 19 February	Elimination #2: Kelly – With alliances forming within the Blue Team, newcomer P’eta quickly finds herself caught in the middle. When asked where her vote lies, she refuses to reveal her choice. At elimination, the shock result comes when Kelly — despite being the Blue Team’s Biggest Loser of the week — is sent home, her teammates citing her manipulative behavior as the deciding factor. The next morning, Shannan arrives at the White House visibly upset at the decision, telling the Blue Team they must put an end to the backstabbing and come together as a united group. Meanwhile, over on the Red side, the team lightens the mood by pranking Michelle into believing Munnalita had been eliminated. Michelle is relieved to find the truth and congratulates her team for the win, praising Laura for pulling the highest percentage loss. She then takes her team outside for a basketball training session, while Shannan pushes the Blue Team through rock climbing as both training and a team-building exercise. Two months on, Kelly has lost 20.9 kg, is eating healthier than ever, and has improved energy and quality time at work and with her two sons.	1,155,000
15/03-3	Tuesday, 20 February	Minor Challenge #3: Treadmill Race – Shannan changes the Blue Team's diet before training them to a heart rate 180 beats per minute! Michelle chooses to set benchmarks for her team, which they will revisit in the future. For the week’s minor challenge, three members from each team faced off in an endurance treadmill test, running at 8 kph until the last contestant remained. The Blue Team chose Gerard, Michael, and Mel, while the Red Team chose Pati, Greg, and Courtney. After 2 hours, only Greg and Michael remained, and contestants were no longer able to hold on. Greg was the winner, clocking an impressive 2 hours, 8 minutes, and 53 seconds on the treadmill and winning a cardio gym for himself and the right to choose The Commando, which the Red Team accepted.	—N/a
16/03-4	Wednesday, 21 February	Temptation #3: Chocolate Fountain/Meet The Commando – The Red Team wake up at 6 am to meet The Commando—former Australian Army fitness instructor Steve Willis, who led them through an intense obstacle course. The session pushed everyone to their limits, with Marty hitting a breaking point and confronting The Commando head-on. Meanwhile, Shannan checked in with the Blue Team at the White House, hearing about their own training and praising Michael for his resilience under pressure. Ajay revealed a chocolate fountain and a variety of dippers ranging from 2 to 140 calories each. The rules were simple: each skewer dipped and eaten counted as one in their cup, and the contestant with the most skewers at the end would win immunity and The Walk. If no one played, Gerard’s immunity from the previous week would stand. Pati and Michael were the only two who played, with Pati eating 5 skewers to Michael's 3, securing immunity for herself.	1,003,000
17/03-5	Thursday, 22 February	The Walk #3: Pati – Pati prepared to embark on The Walk, while back at the house, Laura and P’eta reflected on how they were fitting in. P’eta felt she was bonding well with her Blue teammates, but Laura admitted feeling isolated and vulnerable. Sensing this, Michelle checked in with Laura, sharing her concern that Laura might be seen as the easy target if Red Team ever lost a weigh-in. Meanwhile, on The Walk, Pati was greeted by Ajay and presented with four stone vessels, each holding a potential game-altering twist: ·You must swap teams, choose your replacement ·You must choose two people to swap teams (but cannot choose yourself) ·Choose a Red to decide which two must swap teams (but cannot choose yourself) ·Choose a Blue to decide which two must swap teams She chose the second stone, and after discussing with both teams, she chose to swap Laura and Mel.	1,076,000
18/03-6	Friday, 23 February	Major Challenge #3: Beach Assault – The contestants headed to the beach for their major challenge: filling 12 sandbags, one at a time, and hauling them through an obstacle course. In a nail-biting finish, the Blue Team pulled ahead and won, earning the prize of a phone call home. They were also given the choice to let the Red Team receive their calls, and they agreed without hesitation. For the Red Team, however, the loss came with a penalty: missing Michelle during last chance training.	—N/a
Week 4
19/04-1	Sunday, 25 February	The Weigh-in #3 - The Blue Team’s spirits were high after their challenge win, but Michelle was shocked to learn she could not train her team until after the weigh-in, forcing her to appoint Munnalita and Marty as leaders while Courtney had his injured ankle checked (he was cleared to continue). Michelle gave support to an emotional Mel, while Shannan honed in on Michael, who was not doing his homework, and Damien, who had only lost 2 kg the previous week. Shannan even joined in to push the Red Team through their last chance training, which worried Munnalita—she confided in Michelle that his new diet approach could give them an edge. At the weigh-in, the Blue Team posted a 2.41% loss, with Damien breaking below 200 kg and Michael dipping under 150 kg, but the Red Team edged them out with a 2.45% total loss, winning by just 0.2 kg. Damien was named Biggest Loser of the week with a 3.58% weight loss.	1,034,000
20/04-2	Monday, 26 February	Elimination #3: Michael - The Blue Team were divided over whether to eliminate Gerard for his low numbers and negativity or Michael for missing workouts, but in the end Michael received three votes and, though disappointed, was sent home. Ajay expressed surprise that the team once again voted off one of their Biggest Losers, while Jules regretted her choice and Damien and Laura, who had not voted for Michael, worried the team would suffer without him. Shannan was dismayed to return to the White House and learn that not only had his team lost another weigh-in but they had also eliminated Michael, so he pushed them through a tough pool workout, particularly targeting Gerard. Meanwhile, Michelle rewarded her team with a dance studio session to celebrate their weigh-in victory. Back at the White House, P’eta received a devastating phone call from her father telling her she had been fired from her job, and she later confided in Shannan about the difficulties she faced when she came out. Two months on, Michael had lost 35.4 kg and dropped four shirt sizes.	1,111,000
21/04-3	Tuesday, 27 February	Minor Challenge #4: Jump and Duck Obstacle - In the challenge, contestants faced a rotating obstacle they had to jump and duck under, with the speed increasing every five minutes until one team eliminated the other. To decide which Red Team member would sit out, Jules and Munnalita raced for a flag, with Jules winning, and the Blue Team opted to bench Greg due to his fitness advantage. Starting with the lightest players, Laura impressively eliminated Mel, Munnalita, Pati, and Courtney before finally being taken out by Marty, while tensions flared between Greg and Gerard to the point of becoming physical. Marty went on to defeat Jules, Gerard, and P’eta before Damien stopped his run, but when Mel re-entered, she swept through the remaining Blue players to clinch victory for Red, winning a mystery DVD and their choice of a meditation session or a Commando workout. The Red Team chose the meditation session, leaving the Blue Team to train with The Commando, and while Laura broke down in tears, Jules found strength in herself and began to assert her confidence.	1,080,000
22/04-4	Wednesday, 28 February	Temptation #4: Sushi Train - The Red Team proudly told Michelle of their challenge victory, with Michelle especially impressed by Mel’s performance, and they graciously allowed the Blue Team to view the surveillance DVD, which began humorously but turned sour when Greg was shown taking a tray of meat from Blue’s fridge. For the next challenge, contestants were taken to a sushi train with hidden prizes under each plate, including the coveted immunity, and for the first time in Biggest Loser history, everyone participated. With Ajay declaring that anyone could grab plates until all 36 were gone, the prizes were revealed: Courtney won a trampoline, P’eta claimed five massages and a DVD player, Greg earned the chance to create a family DVD, Damien scored a barbecue, and Munnalita won both immunity and The Walk. Later, Greg’s family was shown watching the DVD he created, which featured Damien singing and playing guitar.	1,043,000
23/04-5	Thursday, 1 March	The Walk #4: Munnalita/P'eta Eliminated - After the sushi temptation, the trainers returned to the White House, with Shannan frustrated at Gerard for barely eating—arguing sushi was low in calories and his team desperately needed a weigh-in win—while Michelle was furious her team participated at all. Later, she spoke with Marty about his back injury and his vulnerability due to the alliance of Pati, Courtney, and Munnalita, while Shannan connected with Jules, who opened up about her son’s Down Syndrome and leukemia diagnoses and the heartbreak of losing her husband to a heart attack while she was pregnant with her third child. Meanwhile, Munnalita embarked on “the most shocking Walk yet,” where Ajay revealed that regardless of the stones, someone would be sent home; her draw required a woman to be eliminated. Mel broke down, begging to be sent home, but after speaking with the other contestants, Munnalita ultimately chose to eliminate P’eta. Two months on, P’eta had lost 16.6 kg, found a new job, and set her sights on competing in a triathlon.	1,101,000
24/04-6	Friday, 2 March	Major Challenge #4: Moving house - Michelle arrived at the house early for a 6 a.m. training session only to find everyone still asleep, and Courtney explained that P’eta had been eliminated by Munnalita, who then broke down in tears during training and admitted to emotional eating. When Shannan arrived, he was devastated to discover P’eta was gone. For the major challenge, teams had to move furniture from one house to another, with each side selecting a Red Team member to sit out—Blue chose Greg and Red chose Munnalita. The Red Team won their first-ever major challenge, earning the right to transfer a player from Red to Blue, and they chose Mel, who returned to the Blue Team.	—N/a
Week 5
25/05-1	Sunday, 4 March	The Weigh-in #4 - The trainers arrived at the White House after the major challenge, where Shannan was disappointed to hear of the Blue Team’s loss but ecstatic to see Mel back in a blue shirt, while Michelle was upset to lose her but the Red Team stood by their decision. At the weigh-in, Gerard was disappointed with his 4.2 kg loss even as his teammates praised his effort, while Marty suggested the immune Munnalita could have done more, further cementing his sense of vulnerability. The Blue Team posted an even 3% loss, but the Red Team notched their third straight weigh-in victory with 3.32%, with Greg emerging as the Biggest Loser of the week at 4.31%.	915,000
26/05-2	Monday, 5 March	Elimination #4: Gerard - Gerard and Laura felt vulnerable due to the strong bond between Mel, Damien, and Jules, leaving the team conflicted over whether to keep the strong but negative Gerard or someone who might better benefit the group. Ultimately, Gerard was voted off despite being the Blue Team’s Biggest Loser of the week, leaving Shannan once again disappointed that his team had lost and eliminated their top performer. He took the team to the beach for a workout, pushing Laura especially hard before leading them into a choppy surf session. Two months on, Gerard has lost 33.8 kg, dropped from a 5XL to an XL, and his kids are thriving with a healthier, more active dad.	887,000
27/05-3	Tuesday, 6 March	Minor Challenge #4: Heartbreak Hill - The contestants and trainers were shocked to find all the gyms stripped of equipment, forcing Shannan to take his team for an outdoor run, during which Laura fell and dislocated her kneecap. At the challenge, teams had to run up and down Heartbreak Hill 100 times while carrying a 5 kg weight. Laura was medically unable to participate, and the Red Team had Munnalita (their choice) and Greg (Blue’s choice) sit out to even the numbers. Michelle and Shannan motivated the teams throughout, and halfway through, when Jules needed a toilet break, Mel and Damien had to cover for her, adding to Damien’s already struggling morale. Ultimately, the Red Team won the challenge and supported Damien in finishing the race. The Red Team chose the key to the spin room as their prize, leaving the Blue Team with The Commando once again.	1,069,000
28/05-4	Wednesday, 7 March	Temptation #5: Food Kiosk - The Commando arrived at the White House for the first time, waking the contestants at 12:30 am for training, but Laura immediately resisted, refusing to get out of bed and worrying about her knee injury. The next morning, Ajay presented a temptation on the lawn featuring a fast food kiosk, where each contestant would eat individually, and the one who consumed the most calories would earn immunity. Greg, Mel, and Marty abstained, while the others participated. Courtney ate the most—2,280 calories—winning immunity and The Walk, though he expressed some regret afterward.	1,034,000
29/05-5	Thursday, 8 March	The Walk #5: Courtney - Jules was taken to hospital after experiencing atrial fibrillation, leaving Shannan shocked by her absence and frustrated that the Blue Team still lacked a game-playing strategy after temptation. Meanwhile, Michelle was furious to learn of the temptation, especially with Munnalita defending her decision to eat two Mars Bars. When Michelle returned to the White House, she challenged Munnalita, asking if chocolate was more important than having a baby, sparking an emotional blow-up. On the Walk, Courtney’s four stones all required him to give up his immunity—to a Red Team member, Blue Team member, man, or woman. He selected the Blue Team stone and, after Jules returned from hospital, chose Damien. The Red Team felt betrayed, believing Courtney should have given his immunity to Laura, and were angry that he went to conspire with the Blue Team behind their backs. Back at the White House, Shannan was relieved to see Jules back and thrilled that Damien had immunity, surprising him with a birthday cake.	1,074,000
30/05-6	Friday, 9 March	Major Challenge #5: Basketball match - The contestants arrived at the Sydney Entertainment Centre for a basketball game with their trainers, coached by Sydney Kings players Mark Worthington for Blue and Cameron Tovey for Red. The Red Team debated who to sit out, and although Courtney volunteered, Michelle initially chose Munnalita, prompting her to storm out in frustration at being sidelined for a third consecutive challenge. The team ultimately changed course and sat Courtney instead. The game grew heated when Marty began playing rough in the second quarter, sparking a confrontation with Munnalita, and in the third, Mel twisted her ankle but fought to stay in. Despite Blue’s 11-point lead in the first half, the Red Team rallied and edged out a 31–29 victory with a game-winning shot from Pati. Their reward was emotional videos from home and the power to decide who would sit out at the weigh-in.	—N/a
Week 6
31/06-1	Sunday, 11 March	The Weigh-in #5 - The contestants returned to the White House after the basketball challenge to find the gym equipment restored for last chance training. Michelle used the session to find the cracks in the Red Team: Munnalita and Pati voiced frustration that Marty was dominating both the workouts and the strategy, while Marty admitted he did not trust Munnalita or Courtney. Meanwhile, Shannan sat down with Laura over lunch to reflect on her progress. The show then checked in with Week 1’s eliminated contestants, Sam and Alex, who were doing a photoshoot—Sam down 28.4 kg, and Alex 34.7 kg along with his glasses. At the weigh-in, the Red Team’s decision to sit Courtney out backfired, as he was their Biggest Loser with a 5.10% drop. Without him, their combined loss was 4.05% (compared to 4.27% with him), falling short of the Blue Team’s 4.43%. Laura was the week’s Biggest Loser for the second time, posting a 5.43% loss and dropping under 100 kg, weighing in at 95.7 kg.	1,115,000
32/06-2	Monday, 12 March	Elimination #5: Marty - At elimination, Courtney and Munnalita voted for Marty, while Greg and Marty voted Courtney—leaving Pati with the deciding vote. She chose Munnalita, creating the first-ever hung vote in Biggest Loser Australia history. That handed the decision to the Blue Team, who after discussion sent Damien to deliver the news: Marty would be going home. Greg tried to take Marty’s place, but Marty refused, and Ajay confirmed the vote was final. The shockwaves hit hard—Marty felt deeply betrayed by Pati, though she and Courtney both insisted they had no idea how the Blues would vote. The next day, emotions still ran high when the trainers arrived. Michelle was devastated by Marty’s departure and furious that it had been the rival team who sealed his fate. She channeled that frustration into revisiting the fitness test she had given her team earlier in the season, with all of them showing measurable improvements. Shannan, meanwhile, took his team—minus Jules, who was once again pulled by the medic—for a lively game of Oztag. Unfortunately, Jules had to be rushed back to hospital for the second time in a week. Six weeks on, a slimmer and more confident Marty revealed he had shed over 40 kg and dropped seven shirt sizes.	1,272,000
33/06-3	Tuesday, 13 March	Teams Dissolved/Jules Withdraws - With Jules still in hospital, the contestants gathered in the weigh-in room to hear Ajay announce a major twist: the teams were officially dissolved. She revealed the leaderboard to date, with Greg leading and Laura at the bottom, before explaining that the contestants would now compete in duos, with the winner of an upcoming individual challenge earning the power to choose the pairs. The trainers met privately with their former teams to share feelings and strategies about this shake-up, but the mood shifted when Jules returned to the house to reveal she was leaving the game on medical advice. Her departure left the group emotional, as they presented her with letters and a painting from Munnalita before saying goodbye. Back home, Jules arrived just in time for her daughter’s birthday, and two months later proudly revealed she had lost 27 kg, dropped below 100 kg, and gone from a size 24 to a size 16.	1,177,000
34/06-4	Wednesday, 14 March	Minor Challenge #6: The Power Balls Challenge - Each contestant began the minor challenge with 10 medicine balls at their station and had to get all 70 balls to their own station to win. Almost unanimously, the contestants placed their balls in Damien’s station, believing he would be the best to hold the power to choose the duos, which he did, also winning an LG television and notebook computer. On the drive back to the White House, Courtney and Munnalita expressed their discontent with Damien holding the power, prompting him to decide that everyone would train together while he spoke to each contestant individually before making his final duo selections.	974,000
35/06-5	Thursday, 15 March	Duos Decided/Marty Returns - Damien revealed the duos: Mel and Greg, Munnalita and Courtney, Damien and Laura, with Pati left without a partner. To replace Jules, the eliminated contestant with the highest percentage of weight loss would return—Marty—causing mixed reactions among the contestants, with only Greg appearing pleased. Marty became Pati’s partner but would not have immunity. When the trainers arrived, Michelle was happy to see Marty back and to discover the duos. She would train Munnalita, Courtney, Pati, and Marty, while Shannan would train Mel, Greg, Damien, and Laura.	972,000
36/06-6	Friday, 16 March	Major Challenge #6: Hangman Challenge - Mel was diagnosed with a stress fracture in her heel, limiting her physical activity. The Commando arrived at the White House to train anyone who wanted a session that day, and all contestants participated, though Mel was frustrated she could not train with the others. In the first major challenge as duos, one harnessed player had to move 15 liters of water to fill a glass tank 7 metres above them using only a half-cup measuring cup, while their partner pulled them up and down. Damien and Laura finished first, earning a 1 kg advantage at the weigh-in, while Courtney and Munnalita did not finish the challenge, receiving a 1 kg penalty.	—N/a
Week 7
37/07-1	Sunday, 18 March	The Weigh-in #6 - The trainers arrived at the house to hear about the challenge and were discouraged to learn that Courtney and Munnalita only managed 18 pulls. Already worried about their 1 kg penalty, Michelle pulled them aside, where Munnalita broke down in fear of going home and not being able to maintain her weight loss. The show then revisited eliminated contestants Kelly and Michael at a photoshoot, revealing Kelly had lost 27.1 kg and Michael 49.9 kg. Back at the house, the contestants hosted a barbecue for the trainers using the grill Damien won in the sushi temptation, applying their nutritional lessons and recipes from The Biggest Loser cookbook. Shannan also learned of Mel’s stress fracture and committed to tailoring her workouts so she could still lose as much weight as possible. At the weigh-in, despite their penalty, Courtney and Munnalita came first with a 6.12% loss (6.56% without the penalty), followed by Marty and Pati at 5.49%, Greg and Mel at 4.12%, and Damien and Laura at 2.72% (2.36% without their 1 kg advantage), which put them below the yellow line. Munnalita was the Biggest Loser of the week with an 8.42% loss, ranking second overall in the house behind Marty.	1,220,000
38/07-2	Monday, 19 March	Elimination #6: Double Elimination, Greg & Mel - With Greg and Mel facing off against Damien and Laura below the yellow line, the remaining four contestants had to vote individually on which duo to eliminate. Mel persuaded the others to send her and Greg home in order to keep Damien in the competition, a decision that deeply upset Greg. Ultimately, Greg and Mel were eliminated, leaving the house in tears. The next day, both trainers were shocked and dismayed to see the pair gone, given their strength and focus. To reset the mood, the trainers took the contestants to the beach, where Shannan worked closely with Damien and Laura, pushing Damien especially hard to his breaking point. Later, all the contestants participated in a beach flags race, with Munnalita narrowly beating Courtney in the final to claim victory. Two months on, Mel had lost 25 kg and was fitting into a size 12, while Greg had shed 42.8 kg and dropped four shirt sizes.	1,289,000
39/07-3	Tuesday, 20 March	The Biggest Twist Thus Far: The Outsiders - In a special 90-minute episode, the contestants are unexpectedly called into the weigh-in room for a surprise. Ajay reveals that a secret event occurred on the day the contestants first arrived: two “Outsiders,” Kimberlie and Chris, had been secretly weighed in and trained by the Commando while living at home with all the temptations of the outside world. Angered and feeling cheated, the contestants watch as Chris and Kimberlie arrive at the White House, weigh in, and share the overall leaderboard: Kimberlie ranked 7th, Chris 3rd, with Marty still at the top. Competing as a duo, Kimberlie and Chris are granted immunity from elimination, further frustrating the original contestants. While Damien and Laura show Chris and Kimberlie around the house, Munnalita and Pati warn Courtney to stay quiet to avoid becoming a target. The trainers arrive, surprised to see the newcomers, and Shannan meets with the Outsiders to train them, while the original contestants train with Michelle before everyone gathers for dinner together.	1,229,000
40/07-4	Wednesday, 21 March	Minor Challenge #7: Wood Challenge - In Kimberlie and Chris' first competitive event, the duos are faced with 16 tonnes of timber (4 tonnes per duo). Each couple must shift their mountain of timber 50 metres to their stations while shackled together. After a gruelling 4 hours and 51 minutes, Marty and Pati finished the challenge first, earning massages and a holiday to Vanuatu. Chris and Kimberlie finished second, although they were trying not to win. Courtney and Munnalita finished third, and Damien and Laura finished last, being placed under lockdown for 24 hours with no access to the gyms.	1,114,000
41/07-5	Thursday, 22 March	The Walk #7: Chris & Kimberlie - Kimberlie and Chris went out on The Walk, which created unease among the other contestants because they are still new to the game. Michelle trained Courtney individually, during which he opened up about how upset he was over Mel’s elimination. On The Walk, Ajay warned Chris and Kimberlie that if they came last in the upcoming major challenge, they would lose their immunity. The four stones were tied to that challenge, advertised as “The Commando’s Challenge.” The options were: Choose any duo to receive a 5-minute time penalty (but not themselves); Choose a duo to receive a 5-minute time advantage (but not themselves); Choose any duo to get The Commando (they may choose themselves); Choose another duo to get The Commando (but not themselves); They drew the fourth stone, and after much discussion, decided to give The Commando to Courtney and Munnalita.	1,073,000
42/07-6	Friday, 23 March	Major Challenge #7: Commando's Challenge - Michelle and Shannan arrived to train their duos outside the house, focusing on teamwork. It became clear that Chris and Kimberlie were not connected as a pair, with Chris being young and competitive while Kimberlie was more reserved and afraid that Chris might push her too far. She also felt that Chris was there for the prize money, while she was there to lose weight. At the Commando’s Challenge, the duos had to gather materials through an obstacle course to build a raft, then paddle it out to collect three tags before returning to shore. The Commando could only offer advice to Courtney and Munnalita but was not allowed to physically help them construct their raft. Courtney and Munnalita won the challenge, earning GPS devices. Despite breaking an oar, Chris and Kimberlie managed to finish third and therefore kept their immunity. Laura and Damien came last, suffering a 1 kg penalty. Damien was more upset that this meant one of the original six contestants would be sent home instead of the Outsiders.	—N/a
Week 8
43/08-1	Sunday, 25 March	The Weigh-in #7 - Shannan was disappointed to learn about Damien and Laura’s 1 kg penalty, while Michelle was pleased that Courtney and Munnalita had won the challenge. Michelle then pulled Pati aside for a private chat, where Pati opened up about her childhood and how she had put on weight as a form of protection. In the eliminated contestants update, P’eta had lost 19 kg and Gerard 37 kg. During last chance training, Shannan reminded Chris and Kimberlie not to rest on their laurels just because they had immunity, and he pushed Damien and Laura to use their penalty as motivation. Michelle had a similar approach with Courtney and Munnalita, warning them not to grow complacent with their 1 kg advantage. At the weigh-in, the immune Outsiders Chris and Kimberlie topped the leaderboard with a combined 3.55% loss, followed by Pati and Marty in second with 2.19%. Below the yellow line were Laura and Damien with 1.56%, and Munnalita and Courtney with 0.81% (0.33% without their 1 kg advantage), as Munnalita had not lost any weight. Chris was the Biggest Loser of the week with a massive 5.41% loss—more than double the second-place contestant, Pati, who dropped 2.28%. Ajay then revealed that only one contestant would be eliminated; in the case of a hung vote, Munnalita would go home, as she had lost the least amount of weight (0.00%).	1,290,000
44/08-2	Monday, 26 March	Elimination #7: Laura/Bob and Jillian Return - The contestants were shocked and disappointed by the weigh-in, with almost everyone putting up low numbers. Ultimately, Laura was voted out with three votes out of four. She was excited to be going home, while her partner Damien reflected proudly on the transformation he had seen in her. Tensions rose when Courtney called out Chris, who was the only one to vote for him, accusing him of being more focused on winning the money than on emotional growth. Ajay then revealed a major twist: the seven remaining contestants were now individuals, and Michelle and Shannan would not be training them this week. After Laura’s departure, the group expressed their sadness at losing her, while Chris dismissed the vote as a stupid move since, in his eyes, she was no threat. Soon after, the contestants were greeted with cleaning supplies and a note instructing them to prepare the house for “mystery guests.” The following day, they lined up in the front drive, dressed in black singlets displaying their total weight loss to date. Their mystery guests were then revealed: Bob and Jillian. Two months on, Laura had lost a total of 23 kg and inspired her father to start his own journey-losing 7 kg himself.	1,295,000
45/08-3	Tuesday, 27 March	Makeovers - Bob and Jillian returned to the White House, shocked at how much weight the contestants had lost, and were introduced to Chris and Kimberlie. They led the group through a tough training session and were impressed by the progress everyone had made since the start of their journeys. Afterwards, all of the contestants gathered together to hear the big news—they would be getting makeovers the next day. The transformations began at the salon, where the contestants traded their workout gear for stylish new looks before stepping in front of the camera for a glamorous photoshoot with Woman's Day magazine. To cap off the experience, Bob and Jillian treated the group to mocktails, celebrating just how far they had come both physically and emotionally.	1,162,000
46/08-4	Wednesday, 28 March	Temptation #6: 1,000 Chocolate Truffles - The day after makeovers, the contestants jumped back into training, with Bob meeting the Outsiders and sharing their weekly weight losses. At their first temptation, all seven contestants were greeted by Ajay, who revealed that they were now singles at the business end of the game. In the temptation room, 1,000 white and brown truffle chocolates were laid out, with 50 hiding an “I” in the shot glass underneath to represent immunity. The first person to uncover one would win, and Marty managed to snag it immediately after eating just a single chocolate.	1,229,000
47/08-5	Thursday, 29 March	Bob and Jillian's Tower Climb Part 1/Life-Size Cutouts - Bob and Jillian returned to the White House to hear about the temptation, learning that everyone had eaten just one chocolate and that Marty had come away with immunity. They later tested the contestants’ healthy eating knowledge by giving them one hour to prepare lunch for the trainers. For the major challenge, Bob and Jillian took the group to the Meriton Tower, where each contestant faced the grueling task of climbing 1,300 steps to the top floor. At the summit, the trainers revealed life-size cutouts of the contestants as another powerful reminder of how far they had come. Just as they caught their breath, Ajay appeared to announce that they would climb the tower again, this time with the prize of an evening with a loved one for whoever beat their time by the biggest margin.	1,121,000
48/08-6	Friday, 30 March	Major Challenge #8 – Bob and Jillian's Tower Climb Part 2 and Time with Loved Ones - After Ajay revealed the challenge, the contestants faced the gruelling climb of the tower for a second time. The results were close, with Kimberlie finishing 7th at 1:38 slower, Courtney 6th at 1:17 slower, Pati 5th at 20 seconds faster, Marty 4th at 35 seconds faster, Munnalita 3rd at 39 seconds faster, Chris 2nd at 52 seconds faster, and Damien taking out the win at 1:54 faster. As the winner, Damien earned a night in the World Tower Suite with his girlfriend. Ajay then surprised everyone by announcing that each contestant would receive a short visit with their loved one: Kimberlie’s dad, Marty’s mum, Munnalita’s husband, Courtney’s partner, Chris’s sister, and Pati’s sister.	1,036,000
Week 9
49/09-1	Sunday, 1 April	The Weigh-in #8 - During last chance training, Chris struggled considerably, prompting Bob to confront him about not eating enough. Before leaving the house again, Bob and Jillian took a moment to express their pride in the incredible transformations of each contestant. We were also given an update on eliminated players Mel and Greg, who had lost 29.5 kg and 44.8 kg respectively. Nerves were high as the contestants faced their first weigh-in as singles. For the first time this season, two contestants gained weight: Damien put on 2.4 kg, and Marty gained 1.1 kg, which cost him his immunity. Both fell below the yellow line and were up for elimination. Meanwhile, Chris was the Biggest Loser of the week for the second week in a row with a massive 6.26% loss, moving him into 1st place overall on the leaderboard.	1,562,000
50/09-2	Monday, 2 April	Elimination #8: Marty - Both Marty and Damien were fearful heading into elimination, with Marty breaking down in tears. In the end, Marty was unanimously eliminated for the second time, with Chris justifying his vote by saying that Marty had broken his word. Marty defended himself, insisting he never had an alliance with Chris. After Marty’s departure, Ajay told the remaining six contestants to prepare for a trip to “paradise,” where they would face their deepest, darkest fears. As the contestants packed, they speculated nervously about the destination and what challenges awaited them. Their journey took them to Sydney Airport, where it was revealed at the Air New Zealand check-in desk that they were headed to Queenstown, New Zealand. Upon arrival, they settled into their new house and were greeted by Michelle and Shannan, who shared that they had personally tested each of the upcoming challenges. Damien confided in Shannan about his recent weight gain, admitting he felt the meal with his girlfriend had derailed him. Shannan reminded him that he needed to stay focused and consistent to get back on track.	1,274,000
51/09-3	Tuesday, 3 April	Mountain Hike - The contestants (minus Chris, who was unwell) were woken in New Zealand by a haka group and led through a training session before Michelle and Shannan took them to Cedar Ridge for a hike. Along the way, they carried backpacks weighted with the amount of weight they had lost each week, a tangible reminder of their Biggest Loser journeys. Emotions ran high as they reflected on the highs and lows of their transformations, struggling up the mountain and expressing that they did not want to go back. At the summit, they removed their backpacks, though Kimberlie chose to add another 35 kg to experience her absolute heaviest before taking hers off, leaving everyone with a powerful sense of how far they had come both physically and mentally.	—N/a
52/09-4	Wednesday, 4 April	Fear Challenges – Part A: Courtney, Kimberlie, Chris - Michelle and Shannan guided each contestant through their individual fear challenges, pushing them out of their comfort zones. Michelle took Courtney to a canyon swing with a 60-metre freefall to confront his fear of heights, while Shannan led Kimberlie rock climbing, during which she became frustrated multiple times but ultimately completed the challenge. Finally, Shannan worked with a recovered Chris on a fly-by-wire experience, which left him needing oxygen and prompted the medic to advise against continuing. Shannan used the moment to counsel Chris on pacing himself and avoiding the self-imposed pressure that had previously caused him to push too hard.	—N/a
53/09-5	Thursday, 5 April	Fear Challenges – Part B: Pati, Munnalita, Damien - Pati faced her fear of white water, jumping off waterfalls, while Shannan took Damien to the same rock face as Kimberlie, where he fell twice and felt like quitting, but was pushed to continue. Meanwhile, Munnalita tackled bungee jumping with Michelle, ultimately dismissing her trainer to do it alone. She froze in tears as Michelle encouraged her, and finally leapt, tearfully telling Michelle she never wants to return to her previous state. Back on the rock face, Damien struggled but eventually dusted himself off and completed the climb.	—N/a
54/09-6	Friday, 6 April	Super Challenge - The contestants packed their bags before heading to the Super Challenge in Paradise, New Zealand, where Ajay revealed an adventure race consisting of a 6 km bike ride, a 1 km sprint, a 4 km river paddle, and a final dash to the finish line. The race culminated in a calorie-counting challenge, where contestants had to select which of six food items contained the fewest calories. While there was no prize for the winner, the contestant finishing last would be eliminated. Chris crossed the finish line first, followed closely by Pati and Courtney, and the episode ended on a cliffhanger with Munnalita deliberating over which food to choose.	—N/a
Week 10
55/10-1	Sunday, 8 April	Challenge Completed/The Weigh-in #10 - We rejoin the challenge in progress as Munnalita, Damien, and Kimberlie complete the final task and select their foods. Pati chose the lowest-calorie item—a cheese and cracker snack—winning the challenge, while Damien chose the highest-calorie item (three eggs, 225 calories), causing him to lose and face elimination. We catch up with eliminated contestant Laura, who has lost 24.2 kg so far, before Michelle and Shannan join the remaining five contestants at Cedar Ridge, shocked and devastated by Damien’s exit. The trainers present the final five with bone carvings as gifts before last chance training. Eliminated contestant Marty is also shown, having lost 55.6 kg. At the White House weigh-in, Kimberlie is the Biggest Loser of the week with a 3.66% weight loss, while Munnalita and Courtney fall below the yellow line and are up for elimination. Two months on, Damien has lost over 68 kg and looks forward to his future singing career.	1,088,000
56/10-2	Monday, 9 April	Elimination #9: Courtney - The mood in the house is somber after the weigh-in. Courtney convinces Chris and Pati to send him home, believing that Munnalita’s dream of having a baby is more important than his own goals, which he feels he has already achieved. Munnalita confides in Kimberlie that she is afraid of going home and slipping back into her old habits. Ultimately, the others respect Courtney’s wishes and vote him out of the game. The next day, Michelle is devastated to see him gone and expresses concern that Munnalita still does not feel ready to leave the house. Michelle trains the three remaining women while Shannan works with Chris, who opens up about his mother’s eight-year battle with cancer. He admits that he has been too focused on competition rather than embracing the journey. Two months on, Courtney has lost over 42 kg, and his life has completely changed.	1,319,000
57/10-3	Tuesday, 10 April	Second Chance Challenge: Balance endurance - The final four are greeted with a DVD from when the game first began and are shocked to see their former selves. The video ends with the message, “Day one you walked, now you will run.” The contestants then run up the same driveway they walked on their very first day. At the gate, they are met by Ajay—and even more surprised by the return of the eliminated contestants (minus P’eta, Sarah, Sam, and Jules), who are all up for a wild card entry back into the competition. Each of them weighs in, showing impressive progress since their eliminations. Ajay reveals that Chris remains the Biggest Loser in the house, with Munnalita in second place and Marty just 100 grams behind in third. It is then announced that the ten wild cards will face a challenge where only five will advance, and of those five, the contestant with the highest weight-loss percentage will return to the game. Michelle and Shannan are shocked but proud to see the eliminated contestants again, and Shannan shares that Jules is now down to 99.6 kg and doing much better health-wise. Michelle trains the final four, with Kimberlie feeling left behind as the biggest contestant remaining, and Chris expressing concern that Marty might return yet again. Meanwhile, Shannan trains the returning contestants and is impressed by their improved fitness levels.The next day, everyone gathers in the front yard for the first challenge. Contestants must pick up two 7.5 kg medicine balls and balance on logs while holding them. Every thirty minutes, they must move to a smaller log while still holding both balls, and anyone who drops a ball or touches the ground is automatically eliminated. If an eliminated contestant wins, they will advance to the qualifying weigh-in and receive $5,000 for themselves and another $5,000 for their favourite charity. If a member of the final four wins, they can block an eliminated contestant from returning. However, if a returning contestant is the first to fall, they are sent home immediately. Mel, still recovering from her stress fracture, was the first to step down and was eliminated. Courtney and Kelly began to heckle each other, which caused Courtney to lose focus and fall. Kimberlie was the first of the final four to fall, followed by Michael, Pati, Alex, Marty, and Chris as the group moved to the second log. Laura was the first to fall on the second log, followed by Damien, Greg, and Munnalita—the last remaining member of the final four. Only Kelly and Gerard remained as they advanced to the third and final log. When Kelly fell, Gerard secured his place in the qualifying weigh-in and chose to donate his $5,000 prize to Diabetes Australia.	1,299,000
58/10-4	Wednesday, 11 April	Second Chance Temptation: Platters - Michelle and Shannan arrive at the White House to hear about the challenge and are impressed with the transformation Gerard has made. The trainers switched roles from the previous day: Michelle trained the returning contestants, while Shannan worked with the final four. The remaining eight returning contestants faced a high-stakes temptation: six platters were placed in front of them, each featuring either a white T-shirt (guaranteeing an automatic spot in the qualifying weigh-in), prizes, food, or a card reading “game over,” which would result in immediate elimination. Marty and Michael chose not to play. Damien selected a burger and chips (only 198 calories), Courtney opted for a plate of gourmet chocolates (999 calories), Alex chose a motor scooter, Kelly took a trip to Vietnam, Laura picked the white T-shirt, and Greg unfortunately drew the “game over” card, eliminating him from the game. He walked off angrily, prompting Alex to try and offer his own spot in exchange, which was disallowed.	1,140,000
59/10-5	Thursday, 12 April	Final Commando Session - Michelle was upset to see Greg eliminated, while Shannan was pleased to see Laura secure a white T-shirt and a spot in the qualifying weigh-in. Michelle was also saddened by Alex offering to give up his spot, feeling he did not believe he was worthy after only being in the house for one week. When Michelle discovered that Courtney had eaten 999 calories worth of chocolates, she trained him individually. The following day, the Commando arrived to put everyone through a tough obstacle course that required them to work together. He was impressed by the contestants’ physical and mental transformations, with Kelly breaking down in pain, though everyone completed the session together. The episode concluded with Michelle and Shannan saying their possible goodbyes to the returning contestants.	1,075,000
60/10-6	Friday, 13 April	Wildcard Super Challenge: Beach Triathlon - Michelle and Shannan arrived at the White House to train the black- and white-shirted contestants, with Michelle leading Munnalita and Pati through a boxing session, both hoping that Marty would not return. Meanwhile, the remaining six returning contestants headed to the beach for their super challenge. They began with a run across the sand and up a dune, answering questions about their diet along the way. A correct answer allowed them to progress to the swim, while an incorrect answer sent them back to the start. They had to complete this circuit three times, finishing at a boat on the final swim. The first three to finish earned the last white T-shirts, while the others—Courtney, Alex, and Kelly—were eliminated from the game once again.	—N/a
Week 11
61/11-1	Sunday, 15 April	Double Weigh-In - Michael, Marty, and Damien returned to the White House after the super challenge, and the final four began to feel threatened. We also caught up with withdrawn contestant Jules, who had lost 30.5 kg, and eliminated contestant Courtney, who had lost 38.4 kg. Shannan trained the returning contestants during last chance training, while Michelle worked with the final four, focusing on Kimberlie. The weigh-in began with the returning contestants: Gerard dropped under 100 kg, weighing in at 99.7 kg. Marty won the weigh-in comfortably with a 6.47% loss, a total of 50.7 kg lost, earning a black shirt to return to the game for a third time. Michael, Gerard, Damien, and Laura were once again eliminated from the game. The final four weighed in next, with all five contestants losing 5 kg or more. Chris was the Biggest Loser of the week for a third time with a 7.82% loss. Kimberlie and Pati fell below the yellow line and would face elimination.	1,310,000
62/11-2	Monday, 16 April	Elimination #10: Kimberlie - Munnalita, Chris, and Marty weighed their options on who to eliminate from the game. Ultimately, Kimberlie was voted off, with only Marty voting against Pati. Chris had harsh words for Kimberlie when casting his vote, even saying, "Ding-dong, the witch is dead." Kimberlie stated that she had called out Chris’ dishonesty from the start and reiterated that he was there for the money first. When leaving, she hugged everyone except Chris. Ajay then revealed that this was their final week in the house. Chris remained quiet after the elimination, feeling he had said his piece. The next day, Michelle and Shannan were thrilled to see Marty back in the game and proud of everyone’s numbers. Shannan trained the two men, tapping into their competitive nature, while Michelle trained the women. Season 1 winner Adro Sarnelli returned to the White House to speak to the final four, inspiring the contestants. Two months on, Kimberlie had lost over 40 kg and dropped from a size 26 dress to a size 16.	1,302,000
63/11-3	Tuesday, 17 April	Train the Trainers - The final four head to the gym and are thrilled to discover it is Train the Trainers Day. Marty and Chris train Shannan, while Pati and Munnalita train Michelle. They push their trainers hard and impress them with how much they have learned throughout the competition. Later, Michelle and Shannan review the results of a sleep study the contestants completed at the start of the game and compare them to now — all showing significant improvement. The final four are then given the opportunity to meet Australians they have inspired. After giving their guests a tour of the White House, each contestant works one-on-one with someone who shares their journey: Marty meets Cameron (150 kg), Pati meets Claire (114 kg), Chris meets Aaron (160 kg), and Munnalita meets Louise (103 kg). The day ends on an emotional high, with everyone feeling motivated and grateful for the chance to share what they have learned.	1,186,000
64/11-4	Wednesday, 18 April	Final Challenge: Personal Beach Dig - The final four travel to Palm Beach for their last challenge. Each contestant must run 250 metres to a marked area in the sand and dig through a 24-square-metre zone to uncover their personal treasure chest. The first to find their chest will win a treadmill. Michelle and Shannan are there to cheer them on as they dig tirelessly under the hot sun. After more than an hour of searching, the contestants begin to unearth their chests, with Pati finding hers first to win the challenge. Inside, each contestant discovers heartfelt gifts from home, reminding them of how far they have come. The day ends as they sail away from the beach together, reflecting on their incredible journeys and everything they have accomplished.	1,195,000
65/11-5	Thursday, 19 April	Final Weigh-in #11 - The contestants and trainers gather in the main gym for their final last chance training. Emotions run high as they push through their last workout together, giving everything they have left. Afterwards, they share heartfelt goodbyes and thank-yous with Michelle and Shannan, expressing deep gratitude for their guidance and support throughout the journey. Before the final weigh-in, Ajay reveals the current leaderboard — Chris remains in first place overall, while Pati sits at the bottom. This week’s weigh-in will be judged solely on percentage of weight lost for the week. When the scales settle, Marty was the Biggest Loser of the week, with a 4.46% loss. Chris was in 2nd place with a loss of 3.44%, also earning a place in the final. That leaves the two remaining women, Munnalita and Pati — the only contestants to have been in the game from the very beginning — fell below the yellow line, with one of them about to miss out on a spot in the final three. After the weigh-in, Munnalita emotionally storms out of the lounge.	1,323,000
66/11-6	Friday, 20 April	Final Elimination and Going Home #11: Munnalita - In the final elimination room, Marty and Chris both vote to eliminate Munnalita. Though disappointed, she expresses her happiness for Pati, saying she hopes Chris does not win. Before leaving, Munnalita promises to match the weight loss of whoever becomes the Biggest Loser. Six weeks later, she has lost over 50 kilograms and dropped to a size 12. Back at the White House, the final three pack their bags and prepare to leave for good. Michelle and Shannan arrive to congratulate them and say their final goodbyes, reflecting on how much each contestant has changed over the past 11 weeks. The finalists then walk out of the White House for the last time, heading home to reunite with their families and continue their journeys.	1,126,000
Week 12
67/12-1	Sunday, 22 April	Countdown to the Biggest Loser - In a special episode, the season reflects on each of the finalists’ journeys, featuring commentary from the other contestants and trainers about their growth and transformation. The episode concludes with the Trainers’ Choice Award, where Shannan and Michelle select the contestant who they believe conducted themselves most admirably throughout the competition. Jules receives the honor and is awarded a new Suzuki Grand Vitara.	1,273,000
68/12-2	Thursday, 26 April	Season Finale - In the two-hour live finale, the season is recapped week by week in front of a studio audience. The eliminated contestants and trainers return, with Bob and Jillian joining live from New York City. Sarah, who quit in Week 1, did not attend. Jules and Sam were weighed in but were ineligible for the eliminated contestant prize due to their medical withdrawals. Michael, eliminated in Week 3, won the $50,000 eliminated contestant prize after losing 42.37% of his body weight. Among the final three, Pati finished third with a 39.93% loss, earning $20,000; Marty placed second with a 41.03% loss; and Outsider Chris was crowned The Biggest Loser with a 46.89% loss, taking home $200,000 and a home gym.	2,023,000

=== Season 3: 2008 ===
Ep#/Wk-Ep#	Original airdate	Episode title / event	Total viewers (free-to-air rounded to nearest 1,000)
Week 1
1/01-1	Sunday, 3 February	Season Premiere – Season 3 begins with host Ajay Rochester welcoming 30 new contestants to the White House. She explains that while they have all made it past the gates, not everyone will make it into the house. Trainers Shannan and Michelle arrive to meet the group, and after speaking with them, receive a letter instructing them to train the contestants and then choose 15 to remain in the competition, with the rest being sent home. Following a muddy and rain-soaked outdoor training session, the 15 white Biggest Loser T-shirts are handed out to Debbie, Sean, Nicola, Monica, Garry, Sam, JJ, Kirsten, Rachel, Cosi, Michael, Sheridan, Alison B, and John. The final decision comes down to twin sisters Nicole and Carrianne, with Shannan allowing them to decide which one will take the final spot. Carrianne, believing she would do better outside the house, elects for Nicole to take the 15th place. The 15 eliminated contestants are then told they will still have a chance to win $10,000 through the Biggest Loser Online Club. As they prepare to leave, they are greeted by The Commando.	1,285,000
2/01-2	Monday, 4 February	The First Weigh-in – The Commando took the 15 eliminated contestants to the sand dunes for a second chance. At the house, the 15 contestants weighed in for the first time, weighing in at a combined 2,137.3 kg.	1,070,000
3/01-3	Tuesday, 5 February	The Warehouse #1 – Seafood / Red Meat – At the sand dunes, The Commando begins eliminating contestants one by one until only four remain. These four are then taken to an airplane hangar, where they receive a video message from Bob and Jillian revealing that they will be flown to Los Angeles to train as the Black Team. Back at the White House, Michelle and Shannan arrive to assess the new contestants’ health conditions before beginning their first training session. During the session, Shannan pulls John aside due to a suspected heart attack, explaining that while he can stay in the competition, he will be ineligible for the cash prize and must train under strict restrictions. After training, the contestants receive a letter informing them that most of the food has been removed from the house and they will be heading to the Warehouse. There, Ajay tells them they must choose between red meat and seafood as the core of their diet for the week. During the discussion, JJ makes comments that anger several of the women, creating early tension. The group ultimately chooses seafood, which pleases the trainers. Meanwhile, across the Pacific, the Black Team meet Bob and Jillian in Los Angeles, ready to begin their own transformation journey.	1,160,000
4/01-4	Wednesday, 6 February	Temptation #1 – Last Plate Standing – The Black Team — Michelle, Bryce, Steven, and Carrianne — have their first official weigh-in in Los Angeles, marking the start of their journey under Bob and Jillian’s guidance. Back in Australia, Shannan leads a boxing circuit. However, Monica breaks down in tears beforehand, struggling with tendinitis in her foot, causing great pain. Later, John receives a phone call from his daughter, who joyfully shares that his first grandson has been born. The contestants then face their first temptation challenge. Each contestant stands on a white disc, surrounded by 15 plates of food, each representing a different calorie value — from the lowest (one piece of chocolate) to the highest (a burger and chips). Ajay explains the rules: if a contestant wants to play, they must eat the lowest-calorie food, then place their plate on a pile and take the winner’s block. Whoever is holding the block after 45 minutes wins immunity. In a show of early discipline, no one chooses to play, refusing to give in to temptation. As a result, immunity is instead decided by chance, based on the disc position each contestant chose at the start. The lucky contestant standing on the winning disc is Kirsten, earning immunity for the week and facing The Walk.	1,093,000
5/01-5	Thursday, 7 February	The Walk #1 – Kirsten/Monica Eliminated – Shannan and Michelle are proud of the contestants for sticking together and not giving in to temptation. Michelle trains Rachel and JJ, pushing JJ so hard that she walks out of the gym, eventually breaking down and opening up about the end of a relationship just before coming to the house. Meanwhile, Shannan gives the contestants a nutrition lesson while Kirsten heads out on The Walk. Ajay reveals to Kirsten that she must eliminate one contestant. The names of three contestants—listed alphabetically—are etched on each of five stones submerged in water-filled vessels. Kirsten picks the stone that lists herself, Michael, and Monica, which upsets both Michael and Monica when she reveals the result to the others. After an emotional conversation with both contestants, Kirsten ultimately chooses to eliminate Monica, citing her injury and training limitations. In Los Angeles, the Black Team has their first workout, where Bob and Jillian push Bryce and Michelle to the point of vomiting and Steven to tears—but Carrianne impresses Bob with her determination. Two months on, Monica has lost 17.6 kg and is living a happier, healthier life.	957,000
6/01-6	Friday, 8 February	Major Challenge #1 – The Maze – After Monica’s elimination, the contestants begin to realize how close they are becoming as a group. Sean is diagnosed with a heel spur before their first challenge at Sydney Olympic Park. Michelle and Shannan arrive and quickly notice that Monica has been eliminated. For the challenge, contestants must run 800 metres to a maze, where the first two to make it through will earn the right to choose their trainer and form their teams. John is unable to compete due to his medical condition. Sam and Cosi are the first to finish; Cosi is the first person to successfully navigate the maze and chooses to join Michelle’s Red Team, while Sam finishes second and selects Shannan’s Blue Team. Despite being the last player to enter the maze, Sean pushes through and becomes the third person out, but has to leave the challenge in an ambulance for further treatment of his injury. Nicole is the final contestant to make it out of the maze.	732,000
Week 2
7/02-1	Sunday, 10 February	Teams Chosen/The Weigh-in #1 – For the Red Team, Cosi selects JJ, Garry, Nicole, Nicola, Sheridan, and Rachel. Sam chooses Michael, Kirsten, John, Debbie, Alison, and Sean for the Blue Team. Meanwhile, in California, the Black Team has their first weigh-in, where Bryce becomes the Biggest Loser with a 6.39% weight loss. Back in Australia, the teams face their first last chance training, marking their first full workout as teams. Debbie struggles emotionally and physically during training, leaving Shannan disappointed with her effort. At the weigh-in, Garry, the largest contestant, celebrates falling below 200 kg for the first time. The Red Team posts a 3.95% total weight loss, while the Blue Team wins the weigh-in with 5.83%, triumphing by nearly 20 kg. Despite being the last contestant chosen, the oldest in the house, and battling a heel injury, Sean emerges as the Biggest Loser of the week with an impressive 7.22% weight loss.	1,151,000
8/02-2	Monday, 11 February	Elimination #1 – JJ – After the weigh-in, the Red Team split into groups to discuss who to eliminate — the men and women meeting separately. The women agree to vote out JJ, but Rachel admits she feels ready to continue her journey at home. When it comes time to vote, the men all vote for Rachel, as she was the smallest loser of the week, while the women stay true to their word and vote for JJ, resulting in his elimination from the game. Cosi voices his disappointment with the women for conspiring separate from the team. Two months on, JJ has lost 10.1 kg and is inspiring his fellow truckies to lead healthier lifestyles.	947,959
9/02-3	Tuesday, 12 February	The Warehouse #2 – Cabbages/Canned Food – Michelle was furious with the Red Team for eliminating JJ, calling the decision “stupid.” She was especially disappointed with the women who had pulled low numbers and channeled her frustration into an intense training session. The Red Team began to view Rachel as the weakest link, while Michelle pulled Cosi aside afterward to check in on him after losing his best mate in the house. Over on the Blue Team, Shannan was thrilled with their weigh-in win and rewarded his team (minus Sam, who was unwell) with a beach training session. Sean sought medical attention for his heel spur, and Debbie once again broke down and walked away from training. The next morning, the contestants discovered that all fruit and vegetables had been removed from the house, prompting a visit to the Warehouse. Ajay revealed that only the week’s Biggest Loser would now make the food decision for everyone. Sean was forced to choose between canned food (with no labels) and cabbages, ultimately choosing cabbages for the Blue Team, leaving the Red Team with the canned goods. In Los Angeles, Jillian pushed the Black Team hard—especially Steven—and later asked each contestant to say something kind about themselves. Carrianne, however, struggled to think of anything positive to say.	975,000
10/02-4	Wednesday, 13 February	Temptation #2 – The Golden Fork – Michelle and Shannan learned about the Warehouse twist, and Michelle helped her team make the most of their canned food diet. During training, Rachel walked away from the session in frustration and was confronted by Michelle for not giving 100%. At temptation, two players at a time sat across from each other at a table, with food presented between them. When the bell rang, the first person to grab the golden fork won the round and had to eat the food. Each round lasted one minute, and if no one played, the previous winner carried their victory forward. As the previous temptation winner, Kirsten was first to play and chose Nicole, who took the early lead by eating a 75-calorie plate of Oysters Kilpatrick. She was overtaken by Debbie, who ate a 240-calorie feta tart. Nicola then beat Debbie with an octopus salad, but was defeated by Sam, who made a last-minute decision to eat a salmon Caesar salad. Finally, Sheridan quickly dominated the game, consuming Moroccan chicken, yellowfin tuna, beef ribeye, and tempura fish and chips—a total of 1,780 calories—to win immunity and the Walk. Alison, Rachel, Cosi, and Garry chose not to play.	1,001,000
11/02-5	Thursday, 14 February	The Walk #2 – Sheridan – The Red Team surprised Nicole with breakfast in bed for her birthday, while in Los Angeles, the Black Team did the same for her twin sister, Carrianne. Bob then took the Black Team to the Santa Monica Mountains for a challenging outdoor hike. Back at the White House, Michelle learned of the temptation and made Sheridan pay for consuming 1,780 calories during a tough training session. Meanwhile, Sean suffered a hypoglycemic attack and collapsed before training with Shannan but was later cleared to continue at a low intensity. The next day, Michelle was disappointed to learn that her team did not support Sheridan when she stayed up training late into the night—prompting Nicole to walk out with a migraine. On the Walk, Ajay revealed to Sheridan that one or both teams would lose their trainer for the week and that Sheridan would decide who. Sheridan chose the stone that removed Shannan from the Blue Team, devastating both him and his players. The Red Team then had to choose a temporary replacement trainer for the Blue Team, debating between Debbie and Sean before ultimately selecting Debbie to lead them for the week.	926,000
12/02-6	Friday, 15 February	Major Challenge #2 – Surf boat race – Michelle was pleased with the Red Team’s decision to have Debbie lead the Blue Team in Shannan’s absence. During training, Sean had an emotional outburst, which only added to his teammates’ frustrations with him. To unite her team, Michelle took the Red Team to play basketball, helping to build morale and teamwork. For the first team challenge, Ajay met the contestants on the beach for a surf boat race. Teams had to drag their boats 250 metres up the beach and back down before completing a 1,600-metre race with a skipper. John was unable to compete due to his pre-existing medical conditions. Although the Red Team completed the boat portion first, the Blue Team crossed the finish line on the sand first, winning the challenge. Their prize included letters from home and the power to choose which Blue Team member would sit out the weigh-in.	685,000
Week 3
13/03-1	Sunday, 17 February	The Weigh-in #2 – The Blue Team became emotional reading their letters, drawing closer together as a team. Meanwhile, the Black Team faced the dreaded week 2 weigh-in and were disappointed with their results, with Jillian particularly concerned about Steven. Michelle arrived at the White House alone to push the Red Team during last chance training, while the Blue Team only trained for one hour, lacking motivation under Debbie’s leadership. Michelle went to check on them and found them gone. Michael and John both expressed frustration with Debbie’s training, which Debbie overheard, leaving her upset. Michelle comforted her and encouraged her to refocus. When the contestants walked into the weigh-in room, they were horrified to see photos of themselves plastered across the walls. The Blue Team chose Alison to sit out, as she had pulled a large number the previous week. Alison ended up being the smallest loser on the Blue Team, with a 2.26% loss. Overall, the Blue Team lost 4.09% (3.88% with Alison), while the Red Team lost 2.23%, giving the Blue Team a 15.2 kg win at the weigh-in for the second week in a row. The youngest contestant, Sam, was named the Biggest Loser of the week, with a 4.87% loss.	1,100,000
14/03-2	Monday, 18 February	Elimination #2 – Rachel – After the weigh-in, tension filled the Red Team. With Sheridan safe thanks to her immunity, the rest of the team were left feeling vulnerable. The main targets quickly became Nicole, for pulling the smallest number on the scales, and Rachel, for her lack of motivation and effort during training. When it came time to vote, the team ultimately chose to eliminate Rachel with four votes. Ajay warned the Red Team that they were spiralling out of control, now reduced to just five members compared to the Blue Team’s seven. Two months on, Rachel had lost a total of 10 kg and was looking forward to a healthy future surrounded by her partner, family, and friends.	976,000
15/03-3	Tuesday, 19 February	The Warehouse #3 – Dine In / Dine Out – The Red Team looked shattered as they left the elimination room. John bluntly told them to “get their shit together,” a comment that upset contestants on both teams. After several days away, Shannan returned to the White House and was thrilled to learn that the Blue Team had won the weigh-in for the second week in a row. Meanwhile, Michelle took her Red Team back to the muddy field where their very first workout began, determined to rebuild their spirit. She shared a heartfelt moment with Garry, who admitted that he often felt like a failure because of his weight. Later, both trainers brought their teams together for a spirited tug-of-war, which ended in the Red Team’s first win of the competition — a much-needed morale boost. Shannan then met privately with John after hearing from the doctors that his training restrictions could now be safely increased. But the next morning, the contestants woke up to find the refrigerators padlocked and the cupboards bare. Expecting another Warehouse trip, they were instead greeted by Ajay, who revealed that one team would “dine in” while the other would “dine out.” Sam, as the Blue Team’s Biggest Loser, chose for his team to dine out, leaving the Red Team to dine in. Moments later, a takeaway van pulled up at the White House, offering the Red Team both healthy and unhealthy meal options — testing their nutrition knowledge and self-control. Meanwhile, the Blue Team were dressed up, blindfolded, and taken to a campsite, where they were met by The Commando. He led them through a grueling nighttime obstacle course, where Sean impressed him by pushing through injury and exhaustion to rejoin his team, while Michael’s lack of effort left him disappointed. After the challenge, the Blue Team dined together under the stars before spending the night outdoors, though Michael complained about both the food and the conditions. Back in Los Angeles, the Black Team faced their third weigh-in. Steven lost only 0.5 kg and, feeling defeated, walked out of the house. Bob followed him outside, where Steven broke down in tears, saying he wanted to go home. Calling the entire team into the gym, Bob reminded them that he could not want it for Steven.	1,104,000
16/03-4	Wednesday, 20 February	Temptation #3 – Circus Balloons of Fate – The trainers arrive at the White House, and Shannan is surprised to find the Blue Team missing. When they return, they share stories of their night camping with The Commando. At the temptation, contestants are presented with several plates of unhealthy food and three dart boards with 24 balloons each. To earn a dart, they must eat a plate: green plates (50 calories) have one immunity, orange plates (500 calories) have two, and purple plates (1,000 calories) have six. The remaining balloons contain prizes. Sheridan and Alison choose not to play, with Sheridan retaining immunity unless someone else finds it. The green plates are eaten first, but immunity is not found. After five rounds and thousands of calories consumed, Kirsten wins a diamond watch, Cosi and Sean win sunglasses, Sam wins a satnav, and Garry wins immunity after eating 2,150 calories.	927,000
17/03-5	Thursday, 21 February	The Walk #3 – Garry / Steven Walks – The next day, Michelle and Shannan arrive at the White House and learn about the temptation. Michelle is furious with Cosi and Garry, while Shannan is upset with John for participating. During training, Garry storms out of the gym after clashing with Nicole, who criticizes the men for watching a DVD instead of working out. Wanting to move past the drama, Shannan confronts Sam about his low calorie intake. Meanwhile, in America, Steven decides not to let his team down and chooses to leave the game. On the Walk, Garry learns that the teams will be evened out—either by swapping a Blue Team member to Red or bringing back an eliminated player. He chooses the first option, and after consulting with his team, selects Sam to join them. Three months later, Steven has lost 10.6 kg and looks forward to a fit, active future with his daughter.	1,016,000
18/03-6	Friday, 22 February	Major Challenge #3 – Brains vs Braun – Shannan is devastated to learn that Sam has been taken by the Red Team. Sam feels conflicted, but Michelle assures him she will take care of him. The teams then face their first indoor challenge — Brains vs. Braun. One contestant serves as the “Brain,” answering trivia questions, while the rest act as the “Braun,” holding a plate that gains 10 kg of sand for every wrong answer. Debbie is chosen as the Brain for the Blue Team, forcing John to sit out yet again. The Red Team sits out Nicola and selects Nicole as their Brain. After accumulating 110 kg for the Blue Team and 50 kg for the Red, both teams begin to struggle, especially the Blue Team due to Sean’s ongoing foot injury.	781,000
Week 4
19/04-1	Sunday, 24 February	The Weigh-in #3 – Debbie missed eight questions in a row, and with Sean’s foot injury holding the team back, the Red Team claimed their first challenge win. Sean apologized repeatedly, but his teammates understood and forgave him. Debbie, however, was upset with her performance. As a result, the Blue Team received a 3 kg penalty at the upcoming weigh-in. In Los Angeles, the Black Team’s morale improved after Steven’s departure, and Jillian helped Carrianne open up about losing her father as a child. For the first time, the trainers were invited to attend the weigh-in. John revealed that he had been diagnosed with depression 12 months earlier, while romance rumors began to circulate between Sheridan and Michael. After two weeks of strong numbers, the Blue Team posted a 1.68% loss (2.05% without their 3 kg penalty). The Red Team surpassed that total—winning their first weigh-in—with a 3.70% loss overall, winning by 16.2 kg. Cosi was named the Biggest Loser of the week with an impressive 5.41% weight loss.	1,151,000
20/04-2	Monday, 25 February	Elimination #3 – Debbie – Shannan warns the Blue Team to avoid a tied vote that would give the Red Team control of elimination. Both Debbie and Sean volunteer to go home—Sean due to his injuries, and Debbie because she feels ready to continue her journey at home. Ultimately, the team votes to eliminate Debbie, who bows out gracefully. Ajay cautions the Blue Team that the coming weeks will be tough, with only five players remaining—two of them injured—while the Red Team still has six healthy members. Two months later, Debbie has lost 29.9 kg and is embracing her new energy and confidence.	947,959
21/04-3	Tuesday, 26 February	The Warehouse #4 – Japanese / Cold Hard Cash – Sean was distraught after the weigh-in, prompting John to take him out of the room. Shannan found them in the gazebo, where John demanded that the cameras leave. Sean had a full emotional breakdown, struggling under the pressure of the game. When he returned, his teammates admitted that they were feeling the same way. Alison struggled with running, as she had undergone ankle reconstruction and had not run since. Kirsten gave Shannan a note from Debbie, which reignited his motivation and lifted the Blue Team’s spirits. During Red Team training, Sheridan lost her temper and lashed out at Cosi, leaving her teammates concerned. Later at the Warehouse, Cosi had to choose between freshly prepared Japanese meals by a professional chef or $60 cash per player for groceries. After much deliberation, he chose the cash—much to the Blue Team’s delight. The Red Team used their nutrition knowledge to shop wisely, while the Blue Team enjoyed their Japanese meals prepared with reduced-sodium soy sauce and brown rice, in line with their nutritional plans. When the Red Team returned to the house, Michelle praised their thoughtful decisions. She later pulled Cosi aside for a phone call home, during which his girlfriend revealed she was pregnant. Meanwhile, in Los Angeles, Jillian led the Black Team through a beach workout, focusing on Michelle.	975,000
22/04-4	Wednesday, 27 February	Temptation #4 – Blindfold Cinema – Shannan pulled Alison aside for a chat, and she immediately broke down in tears, confessing how much she missed her kids—especially after missing their birthdays. The teams later arrived at a cinema for temptation, where Ajay revealed that they would not be playing for immunity this time, but for emotional rewards: video messages from home. The winner would also receive a Samsung video camera to record a message back to their family. Each contestant was given a bowl of chocolate sweets totaling 16,800 calories. Blindfolded, they had 20 minutes to eat as much—or as little—as they wished. Sam decided to playfully distract his opponents, but his prank sent Garry into a panic. Sheridan ate 3 pieces, Cosi 6, Sam 2, and Garry 91 pieces—an enormous 1,274 calories. Although angry with Sam for his interference, Garry ultimately won the temptation and received his video message from home. In a touching moment, Ajay revealed that Garry had also earned the right to share the reward—and he generously allowed the others to watch their messages as well.	1,001,000
23/04-5	Thursday, 28 February	The Black Team Are Coming – Shannan was proud of his team for resisting temptation, while Michelle was stunned by Garry’s decision to eat 91 chocolates. Garry blamed Sam’s prank for his lapse, but Michelle pushed him the hardest during training. Meanwhile, Chef Yoshi taught the Blue Team how to prepare a healthy Japanese meal. After the Red Team’s training, Garry became emotional and opened up to Michelle, realizing for the first time that he had deep-rooted issues with food. In Los Angeles, Bob trained each Black Team member individually. Back at the White House, Sheridan walked out of training, escalating tension between her and Cosi but bringing her closer to Michael. The next morning, all contestants were summoned to the weigh-in room, where they saw the leaderboard for the first time—Nicole sat at the bottom with 8.36%, while Cosi led with 13.07%. Ajay then revealed a video message from Bob announcing that the Black Team would soon be joining them at the White House—leaving the contestants stunned and the trainers furious. Only Nicole is happy to hear that her twin sister is coming to the house.	926,000
24/04-6	Friday, 29 February	Major Challenge #4 – Tyres of Hell - Michelle and Shannan spoke with their teams about the arrival of the Black Team, and most contestants admitted they felt nervous and angry. The players were told to pack for the next challenge: carrying 100 tyres up a 150-metre hill and throwing them into a cage. Ajay explained that while the winners would receive no prize, the losing team would have to eliminate a member. Only one man and one woman per team would compete, with the trainers cheering them on. The Red Team chose Cosi and Nicola, and the Blue Team chose Michael and Kirsten. Each team had a wheelbarrow, a copper log, and a rope to help. The Red Team struggled at first but quickly pulled ahead. Near the end, Cosi nearly gave up, but Michelle pushed him to keep going, securing the win for the Red Team. Both Kirsten and Michael felt responsible for letting their teams down, knowing they would have to eliminate a player today.	685,000
Week 5
25/05-1	Sunday, 2 March	Surprise Elimination – Sean & The Weigh-in #4 – After the challenge, the Blue Team regrouped, split between John and Sean due to their medical issues. Not wanting to hold the team back, Sean volunteered to leave the game. Meanwhile, the Black Team had their final training session with Bob and Jillian in Los Angeles, where the trainers reflected on how far each contestant had come in 4 weeks. At the weigh-in, each team chose a Red Team member to sit out: the Red Team sat out Nicole, and the Blue Team sat out Sam. Sheridan bet Sam $50 that she would lose more weight than him, but she did not. Ajay asked about the ongoing romance rumours between Sheridan and Michael. Nicola dropped below 100 kg, weighing 97.6 kg, a loss of 15 kg since entering the house. The Red Team lost 4.09% of their weight (4.13% including Sam and Nicole), while the Blue Team lost 5.59%, winning the weigh-in. Kirsten was the Biggest Loser of the week with a 6.81% loss, the first woman to earn the title this season. Bob and Jillian took the Black Team up to the mountains to say their final goodbyes before returning to Australia. Two months on, Sean has lost 55.6 kg and is no longer suffering from diabetes.	1,151,000
26/05-2	Monday, 3 March	Elimination #4 – Sheridan – Sheridan convinces Nicole and Sam to vote Cosi out, arguing that he is the biggest threat in the house. Cosi pleads his case to Nicole, insisting that Sam is a greater threat and that a hung vote would leave him vulnerable to elimination by the Blue Team. In the end, Sheridan is eliminated with three votes. She shares that she believes Nicole will be the next to go and feels betrayed by those who voted for her—Cosi, Garry, and Nicola—claiming there had been a plan to eliminate Sam. She is now unsure of where she stands in the game. Garry confirms that he has an alliance with Cosi and Nicola. Two months on, Sheridan has lost 32.2 kg and is enjoying her newfound confidence.	947,959
27/05-3	Tuesday, 4 March	The Black Team Arrive, and JJ Returns – Alison and Michael are devastated by Sheridan’s elimination, while Nicole storms out of the lounge, feeling betrayed by Cosi’s gameplay. Meanwhile, the Black Team leave Los Angeles and prepare to enter the White House. Shannan celebrates the Blue Team’s weigh-in victory, but the moment is cut short when John confronts Alison over rumours that she has issues with him. It is also revealed that John has not been wearing his chest strap and has been training without medical supervision, violating his medical guidelines. The next morning, The Commando wakes the contestants and leads them to pull a 120-tonne barge to shore. When the barge door drops, the Black Team is revealed—and the group learns that Steven has left the game. Bob and Jillian review DVDs of the eliminated contestants to decide who will replace Steven as the fourth Black Team member. Upon arriving at the White House, Ajay greets everyone and introduces JJ as the new fourth member of the Black Team. He also announces that The Commando will now train the Black Team, and that they are safe from elimination this week. All contestants enter the White House together, but the moment is brief; Alison, Kirsten, and Nicole are forced to vacate their bedroom for the Black Team.	975,000
28/05-4	Wednesday, 5 March	John Eliminated – Michelle and Shannan arrive at the White House, reunite with the Black Team, and praise their progress. After discussing strategy with their teams, The Commando trains the Black Team for the first time since they left for America, working briefly with each member one-on-one. Shannan then pulls John aside and informs him that, due to repeatedly breaking his medical guidelines, he is out of the game. The other contestants are stunned by the news and gather to say their goodbyes as John leaves.	
29/05-5	Thursday, 6 March	Secret Ballot – Team Swap –After Michelle and Shannan finish training, they are shown DVDs containing hidden-camera footage from the kitchen, exposing contestants sneaking unhealthy food from the opposing team’s fridge. While the Red Team finds it amusing, Michelle is clearly unimpressed. Meanwhile, The Commando puts the Black Team through a tough bush workout, and JJ is settling in well. Ajay gathers all three teams on the White House lawn and announces that a Red Team member will move to the Blue Team to even out the numbers, with the decision made by secret ballot. Teams may only discuss the vote among themselves. All four Black Team members vote for Cosi, but every Red and Blue Team member except one vote for Sam—sending Sam back to the Blue Team, to their delight. The Black Team realizes the game has officially begun. We then check in with Darryl and Misilei—two of the eleven contestants who did not make any of the three teams but are competing for a $10,000 prize. Darryl has lost 26.6 kg, and Misilei has lost 22.1 kg. The two have become friends and now support each other on their journeys.	926,000
30/05-6	Friday, 7 March	Major Challenge #5 – 3 way Tug-of-War – The Blue Team playfully tricks Shannan before revealing that Sam has returned to their team. At the season’s first three-team challenge, the contestants face a three-way tug of war. In each round, teams pull to capture a flag in their color, with one member sitting out per round. The first team to claim four flags wins and earns the power to choose who receives immunity. Nicole attempts to throw the challenge for the Red Team so the Black Team will win and grant her immunity. Round results: Round 1: Black wins; Carrianne sits out next.; Round 2: Blue wins; Alison sits out.; Round 3: Red wins; Nicola sits out.; Round 4: Black wins; Michelle sits out.; Round 5: Blue wins; Kirsten sits out.; Round 6: Red wins; Nicole sits out.; Round 7: Blue wins; Sam sits out.; Round 8: Black wins; JJ sits out.; Round 9: Red wins; Cosi sits out.	685,000
Week 6
31/06-1	Sunday, 9 March	The Weigh-in #5 – With Bryce, Garry, and Michael remaining in the final round, Garry wins the challenge for the Red Team. Afterwards, the contestants have some fun in the mud, culminating in a wrestle between JJ and Cosi. After deliberation, the Red Team chooses Alison to receive immunity. Michelle is pleased with her team’s win and Alison’s immunity, and is moved when Garry presents her with the challenge trophy. At the weigh-in, the Black Team is measured against their starting weights. Alison drops below 100 kg, weighing 97.8 kg, and opens up about being adopted as a baby. The Blue Team loses 4.82% of their weight, while the Red Team loses 5.11%, narrowly winning by 1.4 kg—the closest margin so far this season. Cosi is the Biggest Loser of the week for the second time in three weeks, losing 6.27% of his weight and reclaiming the top spot on the leaderboard.	1,100,000
32/06-2	Monday, 10 March	Elimination #5 – Michael – The Blue Team is devastated to lose the weigh-in. Alison and Michael promise not to vote for Kirsten, while the boys pledge to vote for each other. The two girls hold the deciding votes. Ultimately, the Blue Team unanimously eliminates Michael in an emotional decision, during which he promises to get back on the football field. Before leaving the elimination room, Ajay warns the remaining players that someone will soon face the greatest dilemma the game has ever seen. Two months on, Michael has lost 45.5 kg and is back playing football with his brothers.	976,000
33/06-3	Tuesday, 11 March	The Warehouse #5 – Cooked / Uncooked – Reality hits the Black Team after Michael's elimination. JJ feels isolated and begins packing, claiming he wants to go home, which leads to clashes with the rest of the team. The next morning, Bryce searches for JJ, but he is nowhere to be found. Michelle is thrilled her Red Team won the weigh-in, while Shannan lifts the Blue Team's spirits after losing Michael. The Commando trains the remaining Black Team members without JJ, channeling their anger into the session, while Michelle takes the Red Team indoor rock climbing. It is later revealed that JJ jumped the fence and left the house, but he is caught and returned, angering the other Black Team members for not taking the game seriously. Bob and Jillian call, giving the original three Black Team members a chance to vent. They speak to JJ, who claims he does not get along with Michelle. Bob encourages them to find peace and work together. At the Warehouse, contestants must choose between cooked food, prepared entirely on a barbecue, or uncooked food. Cosi selects uncooked food, leaving the Blue and Black Teams with cooked meals.	1,104,000
34/06-4	Wednesday, 12 March	Temptation #5 – Food Roulette – Both trainers are pleased with their teams’ Warehouse choices, though Shannan worries about the Black and Blue Teams preparing food together. The Black Team trains with The Commando, using the session to release their frustration with JJ for missing the previous session. Shannan works with the Blue Team, having them carry weighted backpacks representing the weight they have lost so far. In the Black Team’s first temptation, contestants face a roulette wheel with 12 spaces: five contain food, one a 1 kg penalty, one immunity, and the rest prizes. Cosi, Garry, Bryce, and JJ play; Cosi lands on a hamburger, and JJ wins immunity, leaving Bryce and Garry without a spin and the other contestants shocked. Ajay hints that the upcoming Walk will feature a first-ever twist in The Biggest Loser worldwide.	927,000
35/06-5	Thursday, 13 March	The Walk #4 – JJ – Shannan fits his Blue Team with new shoes before leading them through a boxing session, even joining in himself. Meanwhile, the Red Team struggles with their raw food diet and low energy. JJ heads out on the Walk, surprised to find only one vessel containing a briefcase with $50,000, shocking the White House. Ajay explains that the week’s Biggest Loser will have a chance to win the money. Each team then breaks off to discuss the impact of this twist. The episode closes with a check-in on Craig and Dianne, two parents who did not make it into the White House: Craig has lost 21.9 kg, and Dianne has lost 8.8 kg.	1,016,000
36/06-6	Friday, 14 March	Major Challenge #6 – Water Polo – Michelle and Shannan learn of the $50,000 twist before the pool challenge. Ajay reveals a water polo game, which excites Kirsten, a former Australian player. One player from each team swims to retrieve a 5 kg medicine ball and scores in their team goal; the first to 5 points wins. To even the teams, Nicole sits out for Red and Carrianne for Black.: Round 1: Bryce scores for Blue.; Round 2: JJ fouls Sam but still earns Blue their second goal.; Round 3: Michelle scores to put Black on the board.; Round 4: Kirsten defeats two boys, giving Blue their third goal.; Round 5: A rough battle between Sam, Cosi, and JJ ends with Sam scoring Blue’s fourth goal.	781,000
Week 7
37/07-1	Sunday, 16 March	The $50,000 Weigh-in #6 - After Round 5, the score was Blue 4, Black 1, Red 0. Round 6 was another tough battle, but Alison scored the winning goal for Blue. As a prize, Blue earned the right to choose which Red and Black Team members would sit out the weigh-in, though they became ineligible for the $50,000 prize. During last chance training, Michelle had the Red Team wear backpacks with their former weights. She clashed with JJ again, and Alison fainted, needing medical attention. Eliminated contestants Sean and Sheridan were caught up at a photoshoot—Sean no longer requires diabetes medication, and Sheridan’s mother expressed pride in her daughter. At the weigh-in, Cosi and Bryce were sat out and no longer eligible for the $50,000 prize. Kirsten dropped below 100 kg, weighing 97.3 kg. Blue posted a 2.60% team loss, Black lost 2.40% (3.07% with Bryce’s weight), and Red lost 1.51% (1.46% with Cosi’s weight), losing the weigh-in with the lowest team percentage. Bryce had the week’s largest individual loss at 4.95%, but being sat out, Michelle was offered the $50,000 prize—though accepting it would remove her from the competition, reducing the eventual grand prize to $150,000.	1,151,000
38/07-2	Monday, 17 March	Elimination #6 – Nicole - At elimination, Nicole felt increasingly vulnerable. A quiet alliance had formed within the Red Team, and she hoped for a hung vote to take out Cosi. She tried to sway Garry, who visibly struggled with the decision, but her pleas ultimately were not enough. Nicole was unanimously voted out, with her teammates citing her low weight-loss percentage and weaker performance in challenges. Despite the outcome, Nicole said she did not feel betrayed—she believed her team did what they needed to do to stay in the game, just as she would have. Two months on, Nicole has lost 26.6 kg and says she feels happier and more confident than ever.	947,959
39/07-3	Tuesday, 18 March	The Warehouse #6 – Green food/White food/Red food - Carrianne was devastated to see that her twin sister Nicole had been eliminated. She left the room in tears so she could say a proper goodbye, heartbroken that they would now be separated in the competition. Michelle was shocked and frustrated over yet another Red Team loss, while Shannan was thrilled to see the Blue Team on top once again. JJ missed training due to illness, something that deeply annoyed The Commando, who viewed the absence as unacceptable. Meanwhile, Michelle continued to wrestle with her $50,000 decision. She was soon greeted with a letter instructing her to go to the gazebo—where she was surprised by the arrival of her mother. The two sat and discussed the weight of Michelle’s choice. Her mum urged her to remain in the house, while her Black Team teammates were pressuring her to take the money. Still uneasy, Michelle later spoke with the Red Team about their nutrition, concerned that their preference for uncooked foods may have caused their protein intake to drop and affected their weigh-in. At the Warehouse, Michelle was given a new challenge: she had to assign one of three food categories to each team.: Green food: fresh fruit and vegetables, prawns, vegetarian sausages; White food: fish, chicken, eggs; Red food: beef, tomatoes, strawberries, beetroot; As the Black Team debated their options, JJ continued to stir tension, even threatening Bryce and adding to the team’s growing unrest. When it came time to choose, Michelle selected white food for her Black Team, red food for the Blue Team, and green food for the Red Team. She claimed she gave the Blue Team red food because Sam disliked seafood—but Cosi does not believe her.	975,000
40/07-4	Wednesday, 19 March	JJ Quits/Michelle's $50,000 Decision - Cosi and Garry noticed JJ packing his bags late that night, saying he wanted to leave the competition entirely. They tried to reason with him, but JJ insisted he was done. The next morning, he was nowhere to be found. When Cosi went to the Black Team’s room, he discovered a farewell note on JJ’s bed. The message upset Cosi, who had grown close to JJ, but the rest of the Black Team felt relieved that the tension he brought was finally gone. During training, The Commando pulled Michelle aside to work with her one-on-one. He told her plainly that he believed she should stay in the house, pushing her to think beyond short-term gain. Still torn, Michelle later called Bob to discuss the decision. Bob told her that he would take the $50,000, adding even more weight to her dilemma. When decision day finally arrived, Michelle walked into the room visibly conflicted. The players gathered around her as she took a deep breath, admitting she still did not feel fully certain. Ultimately, she made her choice: she would stay in the game. Cosi in particular could not hide his frustration, calling it a “stupid decision,” stunned that Michelle had turned down guaranteed money to continue competing.	1,001,000
41/07-5	Thursday, 20 March	The Burgen Bread Mini-Challenge - Shannan was stunned by both Michelle’s decision to stay in the game and JJ’s sudden departure, still trying to process the shift in team dynamics. The Commando, however, was thrilled that Michelle had chosen to stay, believing she had made the right choice for her long-term journey. Michelle and Shannan then greeted the remaining contestants with a Burgen Bread mini-challenge, designed to test their nutritional knowledge. Each team had to create a sandwich using five of the lowest-calorie ingredients, each in 50-gram portions, and at least one had to be a meat or meat substitute. They also had to work within the constraints of the team-colored food groups chosen earlier at the Warehouse. After careful ingredient selection and plenty of strategic debate, the Blue Team won with a 324-calorie sandwich, earning a 10-minute phone call home. The Red Team came in second and the Black Team finished third; both teams still received 5-minute phone calls to loved ones. The episode then checked in with two more contestants who had not made it into the White House. Alison H had lost 15.2 kg, and Damien had lost 8.6 kg, both making strong progress at home.	926,000
42/07-6	Friday, 21 March	Major Challenge #7: Chin up - Michelle checks in with an emotional Cosi, who is struggling after a phone call with his pregnant girlfriend. His vulnerability catches up with him, and Michelle helps him work through the stress he has been carrying. Meanwhile, Alison becomes emotional during training as she misses her children, and Sam confesses that he feels growing pressure to keep up with the big numbers posted by Cosi and Bryce. At the challenge, Ajay reveals that the contestants will compete in assisted chin-ups, with two teammates holding each competitor’s legs. Each rep must be strict: chin fully over the bar on the way up, and on the way down the arms must return to at least a 90-degree angle. Round 1 totals: Red Team – 260 chin-ups; Cosi: 133; Nicola: 127; Garry: unable to get his chin above the bar; Black Team – 138 chin-ups; Carrianne: 101; Bryce: 17; Michelle: 10; Blue Team – 113 chin-ups; Alison: 66; Kirsten: 32; Sam: 15; But Ajay reveals a twist for Round 2: contestants must now fully extend their arms between each rep, making the chin-ups significantly harder. Then she unveils a poker-style betting table. Each team must secretly bet how many assisted chin-ups they believe they can complete. Only the team with the highest bet will actually get to attempt their number. The Blue Team—driven largely by Sam’s confidence—bets 43 chin-ups, the highest of all three teams. The moment the number is revealed, Alison is immediately scared.	685,000
Week 8
43/08-1	Sunday, 23 March	The Weigh-in #7 - The Blue Team steps up to tackle their bet of 43 chin-ups. Alison goes first and pulls out 23 chin-ups. Kirsten follows and completes the remaining 20 reps, securing a challenge victory for Blue. Both the Red and Black Teams are stunned—and visibly disappointed—that Blue managed to pull it off. As their prize, the Blue Team earns the power to grant immunity, and they choose to give it to Garry. We then check in at the eliminated contestants’ photoshoot, where Michael reveals that he is now just 200 grams away from his goal weight. During last chance training, Carrianne pushes through painful shin injuries, determined not to let her team down. Michelle shifts some of her focus onto Garry, the largest contestant in the house. With all three teams now even in size, no one is required to sit out of the weigh-in. At the weigh-in, Cosi admits he did not fully stick to the green food-only rule from the Warehouse, which adds tension as the Red Team steps on the scale. The Red Team lost 4.30% to win the weigh-in, the Blue Team lost 3.37% for second place, and the Black Team lost 2.15%, losing the weigh-in and sending them to elimination for the first time this season. Cosi earns the title of Biggest Loser of the Week for the third time, dropping another 5.19% of his body weight.	1,100,000
44/08-2	Monday, 24 March	Elimination #7 – Carrianne - Bryce wants to vote Carrianne out, and Michelle tells Carrianne to vote for her. Cosi convinces Michelle to vote for Bryce, seeing him as a threat. Bryce and Carrianne stick to their original choices, leaving Michelle with the deciding vote. After careful consideration, Michelle votes Carrianne out, citing her injuries as the reason. Carrianne takes it gracefully, agreeing that with her limitations, it was the best decision for the team. Two months on, Carrianne has lost 19.7 kg and is training regularly alongside her twin sister, Nicole.	976,000
45/08-3	Tuesday, 25 March	Welcome to Singles - Cosi is unhappy with Michelle’s decision to vote Carrianne out, while Bryce shares Ajay’s parting words—“what goes around comes around”—with both the Red and Blue teams. This comment fuels speculation that the team phase is about to end. Their suspicions are confirmed when Ajay gathers the contestants and announces that they are now playing as singles. She unveils the yellow line along with the current leaderboard, showing Michelle in 8th place and Cosi still at the top in 1st place. Tensions rise as Bryce confronts Cosi over his gameplay, bluntly calling him a snake. The contestants then change into their new individual colors before heading into the trophy room to reflect on past contestants. Finally, Kirsten and Cosi—the two Biggest Losers in the house—face off in a battle of the sexes, a 3K rowing duel. In a close finish, Cosi narrowly wins, leaving the girls with kitchen duty for a week.	1,104,000
46/08-4	Wednesday, 26 March	Temptation #6 – The Breakfast Bar – Shannan and Michelle are shocked to discover that the contestants are now playing as singles. Bryce and Michelle phone Bob and Jillian in the U.S., who are equally stunned that Michelle chose not to take the $50,000 buyout. They are saddened to hear that Carrianne is gone but offer encouragement and wisdom as the remaining players prepare for the intensity of playing solo. Shannan takes the men to a power yoga class, where Bryce opens up for the first time about losing his father in a car accident, deepening the emotional stakes for him. At Temptation, Ajay reveals a twist: each contestant must serve a breakfast tray to an opponent. Whoever eats the most calories in ten minutes wins immunity. The trays are as follows: Garry → Michelle: a bowl of yoghurt; Kirsten → Cosi: a bowl of watermelon; Cosi → Garry: a massive 3,025-calorie Big Breakfast; Nicola → Kirsten: a piece of toast with Nutella; Bryce → Alison: nine pancakes; Michelle → Sam: a bowl of Coco Pops with milk; Sam → Nicola: a muffin; Alison → Bryce: a plate of pastries; Curtains drop between the contestants, and the ten minutes begin. Alison attempts to eat but quickly feels sick and stops. Nobody else takes a bite—except Michelle, who quietly finishes her simple bowl of yoghurt. Michelle wins immunity, having eaten only 95 calories. The house is stunned, especially by the fact that Garry did not play temptation.	927,000
47/08-5	Thursday, 27 March	Loser Legends Arrive – Ajay reveals that the contestants will be receiving new houseguests for 24 hours. They are stunned as past contestants—Wal, Munnalita, Damien, Kristie, Tracy, Courtney, Pati, and Adro—enter the White House. After catching up, the legends walk through the house to relive old memories, including a visit to the trophy room. Michelle and Shannan arrive and are delighted to see the former players. They train with them and share lunch before the next twist is revealed: Wal reads a note stating that each current contestant must choose a legend partner for the upcoming challenge, with pairs required to be boy–girl duos. The teams form as follows: Nicola + Wal; Alison + Damien; Kirsten + Courtney; Michelle + Adro; Cosi + Munnalita; Bryce + Kristie; Sam + Tracy; Garry + Pati	1,016,000
48/08-6	Friday, 28 March	Major Challenge #8 – Bus Pull – The contestants trained with their legend partners before heading into the challenge. Ajay revealed that each duo would be pulling 9-tonne buses, with winners of each heat moving to the semifinals, and those winners advancing to the grand final. Heats: Heat 1: Sam & Tracy defeated Bryce & Kristie; Heat 2: Alison & Damien defeated Kirsten & Courtney, with Damien returning to help motivate them to finish; Heat 3: Garry & Pati defeated Cosi & Munnalita; Heat 4: Michelle & Adro narrowly defeated Nicola & Wal; Semifinals: Alison & Damien defeated Sam & Tracy; Garry & Pati defeated Michelle & Adro	781,000
Week 9
49/09-1	Sunday, 30 March	The Weigh-in #8/Bob and Jillian Return – The final round was a 400-metre bus pull, where Garry and Pati beat Alison and Damien, earning Garry a 2 kg advantage. The legends shared their final words before leaving. A catch-up segment showed twins Nicole and Carrianne at their photoshoot. Bryce and Michelle received a call from Bob and Jillian, then turned to see them walking up the White House driveway. After greeting the others, Bob and Jillian took Bryce and Michelle to the trophy room to watch their audition tapes—prompting tears from Bryce—before giving them their first training session in a month. Michelle and Shannan then arrived, stunned to see Bob and Jillian back, and immediately prepared their teams for an intense last-chance training. At the first singles weigh-in, Michelle became the last woman to drop below 100 kg, and Cosi became the first man to do the same, celebrating with “You Beauty” written across his bare bottom. Garry passed 50 kg lost, now at 52.6 kg total. Bryce was the Biggest Loser of the week with a 5.32% loss. Alison and Nicola fell below the yellow line and faced elimination (Michelle actually placed seventh but had immunity).	1,151,000
50/09-2	Monday, 31 March	Elimination #8 – Nicola – The mood after the weigh-in is low. With Cosi and Garry backing Nicola, and Sam and Kirsten backing Alison, the former Red Team work to convince the former Black Team to vote Alison out, seeing her as the bigger threat. Michelle, however, votes against Nicola, citing their personality clash and wanting to break the old Red Team alliance. Nicola is eliminated. Cosi calls the decision “silly,” arguing Alison posed the larger threat and Bryce should have been eliminated the week before for the same reason. Michelle fires back, noting Garry was a bigger threat than Nicole—whom Cosi voted out two weeks earlier. Two months on, Nicola has lost 28.1 kg and is enjoying time with her family and friends.	947,959
51/09-3	Tuesday, 1 April	Makeover Special – When the trainers arrive after elimination, Michelle breaks down over her confrontation with Cosi and is comforted by Bob. In training, Bryce finally opens up about his father’s death and breaks down as well. The contestants are then surprised with makeovers. They get new hair, makeup, and outfits before walking a catwalk with their trainers—only to be met at the end by a loved one.	975,000
52/09-4	Wednesday, 2 April	Temptation #7 – Snap! – Michelle reaches the house and finds Cosi alone, quietly watching the ultrasound DVD his girlfriend gave him during makeovers. The moment softens their recent tension. Later, she channels that emotion into a fierce boxing session with Cosi and Garry, pushing both men hard and igniting their competitive streaks. Temptation is a twist on Snap: food item revealed, cards dealt, first to snap eats it, then knocks someone out. Last standing wins.: Round 1: Cosi eats marshmallows (120 cal) → eliminates Bryce; Round 2: Cosi eats jam donut (360 cal) → eliminates Sam; Round 3: Garry eats lamb’s brains (160 cal) → eliminates Kirsten; Round 4: Cosi eats black forest cake (635 cal) → eliminates Michelle; Round 5: Cosi eats fish eyes (18 cal) → eliminates Alison; Final round: Garry snaps first, eats two chocolate éclairs (1,800 cal), beats Cosi, and wins immunity and The Walk.	1,001,000
53/09-5	Thursday, 3 April	The Walk #5 – Garry – Cosi spirals after losing immunity, overeating for a total of 4,800 calories for the day (including Temptation). When the trainers arrive at the White House and learn that both Garry and Cosi kept eating after the challenge, they are furious. Michelle splits them up for training and quickly sees how sluggish they are—especially Cosi. He finally breaks down, admitting to his binge and how much he misses his family. Garry heads out on The Walk, while the others go to the beach for training: a swim in the ocean followed by Australians vs. Americans beach volleyball. The Americans jump ahead early, but the Australians rally and win. On the Walk, Garry finds two stones: Swap your weight loss with a male opponent; Swap your weight loss with a female opponent; He picks the second option and immediately regrets it. Ajay warns him that he must keep it secret until weigh-in or face major consequences. Back at the house, Alison and Kirsten find him hiding the rock, and though he will not reveal the power, he admits he has been sworn to silence, frustrating the group. Michelle later lifts Cosi’s spirits with a surprise call from his stepson. The episode closes with updates from two eliminated hopefuls: Adam has lost 21.2 kg and is back on the basketball court. Stacey has lost 24.6 kg.	926,000
54/09-6	Friday, 4 April	Major Challenge #9 – 7 Deadly Tonnes – Shannan is happy with his former Blue Team’s steady, disciplined eating. At the challenge, each contestant must move 1 tonne of a randomly assigned object across a field. The winner earns a Samsung plasma TV; the last-place finisher must weigh in immediately. Assignments: Alison: bricks; Kirsten: sandbags; Sam: steel poles; Bryce: tyres; Michelle: wooden logs; Cosi: water bottles/jugs; Garry: weights and plates; Cosi finishes first, with Garry right behind him. Cosi goes to help Kirsten; Garry helps Alison. Bryce finishes third and assists Michelle. Kirsten finishes fourth and joins in helping Alison. Alison finishes fifth and moves on to help Sam.	685,000
Week 10
55/10-1	Sunday, 6 April	The Weigh-in #9 – With only Sam and Michelle still moving their tonne, Sam crosses the line sixth, leaving Michelle last—and furious. As the penalty, she weighs in immediately, dropping 2.3 kg (2.33%). The trainers hear about the challenge and Garry’s secret Walk twist. Bob notes that the pressure is wearing Michelle down. We then catch up with Steven (Week 3) and Nicola (Week 8) at the photoshoot. After last-chance training, Garry finally shows the group the Walk stone. The women are upset, especially not knowing who he will target. At the weigh-in, Garry chooses to swap his weight with Kirsten, who he sees as the strongest remaining woman. The move backfires: Kirsten posts her lowest loss yet, but Garry gains 1.5 kg, making her even more exposed. Kirsten and Bryce (1.38%) fall below the yellow line and are up for elimination. Despite a hard emotional week, Cosi is the Biggest Loser again for the fourth time—with 2.73% lost.	1,244,000
56/10-2	Monday, 7 April	Elimination #9 – Bryce – After the weigh-in, Garry walks out upset, leaving Kirsten follows him outside to comfort him. Inside, Michelle pushes hard to keep Bryce safe, arguing to Cosi that Bryce sits 5th overall, while Kirsten is 2nd, right behind Cosi on the leaderboard. In the end, and Bryce is eliminated, with only Michelle casting a vote for Kirsten to go. Before leaving, Bryce gives Sam his watch. Two months on, Bryce is down 47 kg and says he finally has a new lease on life with the people he loves.	1,222,000
57/10-3	Tuesday, 8 April	Heading to Hawaii – The final six wake to a letter announcing they are heading to Hawaii. They are greeted by the trainers, with Jillian visibly upset to learn that Bryce has been eliminated. The trainers make it clear this trip will not be a holiday. The next morning, on Sam’s 20th birthday, the contestants arrive at Kualoa Ranch for a gruelling hike. Along the way, they add weight to their backpacks representing their weekly weight losses to date, reflecting on their Biggest Loser journeys. As the packs approach their original body weights, the climb becomes increasingly difficult and emotional. Upon reaching the summit, they remove their backpacks, symbolically freeing themselves from their former selves and vowing never to return to their starting weights.	1,328,945
58/10-4	Wednesday, 9 April	Face your Fears Part 1 – Kirsten, Garry & Cosi – The trainers challenged the contestants to confront their deepest fears. Garry faced his fear of failure as Michelle took him to a steep mountain rock face. Though he struggled at first, he found his confidence and successfully completed the climb. Shannan then helped Kirsten confront her fear of losing control by taking her paragliding. She embraced the experience, finding it freeing and empowering. Finally, Michelle brought Cosi to a cliff overlooking the ocean, where he was asked to complete a 10-metre jump. Overcome with emotion, Cosi pushed through his fear and took the leap, marking a powerful moment in his journey.	1,050,000
59/10-5	Thursday, 10 April	Face your Fears Part 2 – Sam, Michelle & Alison – Shannan next challenges Sam to swim with sharks. He begins inside a cage, symbolizing how he has lived his life confined by fear, before eventually leaving the cage and completing the swim. Michelle faces her own fear of heights when Bob and Jillian meet her at an airfield. She is strapped into an engineless glider and towed 5,000 feet into the air, where she pulls a lever and takes control, marking a powerful personal breakthrough. Shannan helps Alison confront her fear with a 30-foot cliff dive. After intense hesitation, she jumps. Jillian and Michelle then take the women paddleboarding at the beach, racing each other, with Alison claiming victory. Before leaving Hawaii, Bob and Jillian present Michelle with a bone-carving necklace as a farewell gift, confirming they will not return to Australia with her. On their final night, Shannan and Michelle gift the remaining contestants their own bone-carving necklaces and reveal that a super challenge awaits them the following day.	1,146,000
60/10-6	Friday, 11 April	The Hawaii Super Challenge – On their final day in Hawaii, the final six meet Ajay for a super challenge: a race from the mountains to the sea. The course includes a 500-metre run, a 4-kilometre bike ride, a 3-kilometre kayak around Chinaman’s Hat Island, and a jungle run to the finish. At the end, six plates of food await; the contestant who ends up with the highest-calorie option is eliminated. Cosi finishes first and selects 200 g of yoghurt. Sam comes second and chooses a 55 g chocolate bar. Kirsten finishes third and takes a 220 g tin of baked beans. Michelle finishes fourth and chooses a 600 mL bottle of orange soda. Alison finishes fifth and takes a 74 g packet of French fries. After struggling on the bike and falling off his kayak, Garry finishes last and is left with a 60 g bowl of fruit muesli.	
Week 11
61/11-1	Sunday, 13 April	Surprise Elimination – Michelle / The Weigh-in #10 – Ajay reveals the calorie counts from the super challenge. Cosi’s yoghurt is lowest at 80 calories, followed by Kirsten’s baked beans (181). Alison’s fries come in third (250), Garry’s muesli fourth (277), and Sam’s chocolate bar fifth (290). Michelle’s orange soda is highest at 304 calories, eliminating her from the game. She leaves by outrigger canoe as the final Black Team member to leave the game. The remaining five return to the White House, where the trainers learn about the super challenge and Michelle’s exit. We catch up with Bryce at the photoshoot. Back in the house, tensions rise as contestants sabotage each other’s nutrition: Cosi tempts others with nuts, while Sam swaps Cosi’s light chocolate topping for full-fat, compromising his pre weigh-in shake. Michelle admits she pushed Garry harder but held back with Cosi, sensing his fatigue. At weigh-in, Ajay hints at sneaky tactics, fuelling suspicion. Cosi places last and confesses to making a much larger shake than usual, prompting Sam to feel guilty about his sabotage. Kirsten is Biggest Loser of the week with a 5.40% loss, while Sam and Cosi fall below the yellow line and face elimination.	1,208,000
62/11-2	Monday, 14 April	Elimination #10 – Cosi – With the two biggest threats below the yellow line, Alison and Kirsten reaffirm their Blue Team loyalty to Sam. Cosi tries to sway Kirsten to vote Sam out, arguing that Sam has more weight left to lose and that he himself has already surpassed his goal weight. Despite this, both women stand by Sam and vote for Cosi, eliminating him from the game. Sam admits to sabotaging Cosi’s chocolate topping, which Cosi does not appreciate. Cosi exits with grace, saying he is excited to share his healthier lifestyle with his family, reunite with his fiancée, and prepare for the birth of his baby. He believes Sam will now go on to win. Ajay then tells the final four that another bombshell is still to come. Two months on, Cosi has lost 49.3 kg and is loving his active new life, proud to be a positive role model for his family and eagerly awaiting his new baby.	1,206,000
63/11-3	Tuesday, 15 April	Eliminated Contestants Return – Everyone is upset to see Cosi leave, particularly Michelle, though the final four are proud of their results that week. The next day, Ajay greets them with photos of their former selves alongside food representing their total weight loss: mashed potato for Alison, chocolate for Kirsten, pizza for Sam, and chicken burgers for Garry—a combined 191.5 kg. The cutouts are then raised to reveal the eliminated contestants, except for John, Stephen, and JJ. Ajay announces that two of them will return to the competition, leaving the final four, especially Garry, uneasy. The eliminated contestants weigh in, with Cosi and Sean posting the highest weight loss percentages at 35.01% and 33.96%, respectively.	1,360,000
64/11-4	Wednesday, 16 April	Temptation #8: The Eliminated Decide – Michelle and Shannan arrive at the White House and are shocked to see the eliminated contestants back. Everyone heads to Temptation, but only the final four are competing. Ajay explains the twist: plates range from 100 to 1,000 calories, and the contestant who eats the least each round is eliminated until one remains and wins immunity. The eliminated contestants decide who gets which dish and are sent away to strategise. In round one, Kirsten eats 100 calories of marshmallows, Alison eats a 250-calorie caramel slice, Sam eats a 500-calorie sausage roll, and Garry refuses a 1,000-calorie deep-fried Mars bar, eliminating himself and shocking everyone. In round two, Alison eats another caramel slice, Sam eats another sausage roll, and Kirsten eats the deep-fried Mars bar, knocking Alison out. In the final round, Kirsten is served the sausage roll and Sam the Mars bar. Both refuse to eat, handing the decision to the eliminated contestants, who choose Sam as the winner. Sam receives a 1 kg advantage at the weigh-in.	1,143,000
65/11-5	Thursday, 17 April	Major Challenge #10 – Stacks On – Michelle and Shannan learn about the Temptation result, with Michelle both shocked and proud that Garry did not eat. Shannan trains the final four in the gym, where Garry and Kirsten both hit an impressive 20 kph on the treadmill. Meanwhile, Michelle puts the eliminated contestants through a basketball session, during which Monica injures her back. The eliminated contestants then face their first challenge back, with only six spots available. Monica is ruled out due to injury and eliminated immediately. The challenge, Stacks On, sees contestants hold a barbell across their backs while choosing opponents to receive an extra 10 kg, which Michelle and Shannan load on. If a contestant steps off or drops the bar, they are out. Nicole is the first eliminated after 40 kg, leaving her devastated. Debbie drops out next in round three, followed by Carrianne in round four. Sean is eliminated in round five after reaching 80 kg, a moment that makes Alison proud. Rachel steps off shortly after, ending the challenge. Shannan confronts Michael for targeting his former teammate Sean, causing Michael to break down. The eliminated contestants say their goodbyes and leave the White House once again. Michelle selects Nicola and Cosi to form her trio, while Shannan chooses Michael and Sheridan. It is then revealed that The Commando will form the final trio alongside Michelle and Bryce.	1,274,000
66/11-6	Friday, 18 April	Eliminated Contestants Super Challenge – The final four train at the White House, frustrated that two eliminated contestants are returning. Meanwhile, the returning contestants meet Ajay and the trainers at the sand dunes for the Super Challenge. Trios are tied together and must descend 30 metres down the dune to complete an obstacle course: burrow under a steel bar, climb a wall, dig under another bar, then scale the opposite dune. At the top, they must carry 15 kg hay bales and stack 11 to release a flag 4 metres above. The first team to raise their flag wins their spot back in the competition. Sheridan struggles the most, holding Shannan’s trio back, while The Commando’s trio take the lead as the episode ends, with Michelle and Shannan's trios close behind.	1,045,000
Week 12
67/12-1	Sunday, 20 April	The Weigh-in #11 – The Super Challenge continues, but a costly mistake from Nicola—dropping a hay bale—puts Michelle’s trio behind. The Commando’s trio takes the win, sending Bryce and Michelle back into the competition. Cosi, Michael, Sheridan and Nicola reflect on their journeys as they officially leave the game. Back at the White House, Bryce and Michelle’s return is met with frustration from the final four, who regroup and vow to stay united. Alison receives a phone call home for her 35th birthday, giving her a boost of motivation. During last chance training, tensions run high—Michelle struggles under The Commando’s pressure, Alison and Kirsten are angry about the returning players, and Garry is pushed to his limits. At the weigh-in, Sam hits exactly 100 kg and Alison drops below 80 kg. Kirsten and Bryce clash, and Kirsten fears it may have cost her when she falls below the yellow line. Alison is named Biggest Loser of the week with a 4.20% loss. Kirsten and Michelle fall below the line and face elimination.	1,315,000
68/12-2	Monday, 21 April	Elimination #11 – Michelle – Bryce again voices his frustration with Kirsten, as tensions remain high. Michelle and Kirsten both plead their cases to Sam and Garry, knowing Bryce and Alison’s votes are already decided. In the end, Michelle is eliminated for the third time, bowing out gracefully. Ajay then tells the remaining five contestants that an “ultimate surprise” awaits them in their final week at the White House. Two months on: Michelle has lost 30 kg and is enjoying life with her new boyfriend.	1,225,000
69/12-3	Tuesday, 22 April	Train the Trainers / Dream Outfits – As the final week in the house begins, Garry and Bryce feel vulnerable against the former Blue Team members. Bryce gets a call from Bob, who tries to keep him positive. Kirsten and Alison head to the gym and are surprised to find it closed for Train the Trainers Day. The contestants plot revenge, pushing Michelle and Shannan to their absolute limits before thanking them, with the trainers later getting payback. During training, Garry suffers a quadriceps injury. Later, the contestants watch their audition tapes and dress in their “dream outfits,” symbolising their journeys so far.	1,373,000
70/12-4	Wednesday, 23 April	Temptation #9 – Last Plate Standing – Shannan pushes the final five with an intense boxing session, taking his former Blue Team members to their absolute limit. The contestants then face a repeat of their first temptation: 15 high-calorie plates are placed in front of them, and the first to grab a plate eats it and stacks the empty plate in the centre. After 10 minutes, the plate on top determines the winner. Like before, nobody played, so immunity was decided by the disc they were standing on. Alison lands on the immunity disc, earning a spot in the final but also taking the final Walk.	1,230,000
71/12-5	Thursday, 24 April	The Walk #6 – Alison – Michelle and Shannan are proud that no one played temptation, with Shannan especially pleased to see Alison secure a spot in the final. We catch up with three contestants who did not make it into the house: Sandy (-13.8 kg), Steve (-21.7 kg), and Lauren (-23 kg). Alison heads out on the Walk and is surprised to find no Ajay—just a single vessel. She pulls a stone reading: “Your immunity is in jeopardy. Return to the White House immediately.” Back at the house, Ajay awaits with the remaining contestants and unveils a cash offer: $34,000 for Alison—$1,000 for every percent of weight she has lost. She has two minutes to decide but must leave the game if she accepts. Alison declines. The same offer is then extended to the others: $31,000 for Garry, $35,000 for Sam, and $32,000 for Bryce. They are given one hour to decide—whoever hits the gong first takes the money and leaves the game. While they deliberate, the contestants are sent to the DVD room to watch clips from the first two finales, finishing with their own first and most recent weigh-ins.	1,153,000
72/12-6	Friday, 25 April	Cash Temptation / Bryce Walks – After watching the clips, Bryce realises he has achieved everything he set out to do and decides to take the cashout. The others suspect Garry might race him to the gong, but he holds back. Bryce hits it first, taking $32,000 and leaving the competition. The remaining four receive heartfelt letters from home, written before entering the show, along with old photos. For their final last chance training, the trainers take them out of the White House. The session pushes late into the night, and when the lights suddenly go out, car headlights illuminate the area as they dig deep to finish strong.	1,133,000
Week 13
73/13-1	Sunday, 27 April	The Weigh-in #12 and Elimination #12 – Garry – At the final White House weigh-in, Sam drops below 100 kg and earns Biggest Loser of the week for the second time. Alison finishes third but is safe thanks to her immunity. Kirsten and Garry fall below the yellow line. Garry heads to his room upset, trying to sway Sam to vote for Kirsten, but Sam stays loyal to his former Blue Team. Garry is eliminated. One month on, he has lost 66 kg and is looking forward to reuniting with his father. The next day, the final three wake, get dressed, and prepare to leave the house. Michelle is upset to see Garry gone, while Shannan is proud of the trio. They share heartfelt goodbyes before heading home to loved ones.	1,561,000
74/13-2	Thursday, 1 May	Grand Finale – In front of a live studio audience, the eliminated contestants are reintroduced (JJ, who quit in Week 7, is absent). Craig Smith wins the $10,000 prize for contestants who did not make it into the house, having lost 51.3 kg, or 36.5% of his body weight. Michelle, Shannan, and The Commando join the weigh-in, with Bob and Jillian watching the Black Team via webcam. Steven, John, and Bryce are ineligible for the $30,000 runners-up prize, though they weigh in. Sean claims the $30,000 prize, losing 45.7% of his weight and having reversed his diabetes. The final three weigh in: Kirsten finishes third with a 43.3% loss, winning $10,000. Alison comes second with a 45.36% loss, taking home $25,000. Sam, age 20, is crowned the youngest Biggest Loser Australia winner, losing 46.38% of his weight and winning $200,000. In a world first, all 30 contestants weigh in together, revealing a combined loss of 1,153.9 kg.	1,896,000

=== Season 4: 2009 ===
The fourth season started off with a peak of 1.7 million viewers and averaged 1.2 million over the premiere episode. The finale night scored 1.7 million, beating Underbelly's: A Tale Of Two Cities, with a successful finish of 2 million viewers when the winner was announced.

Ep#/Wk-Ep#	Original air date	Episode title / event	Total viewers (free-to-air rounded to nearest 1,000)
Week 1
1/01-1	Sunday, 1 February	Season Premiere – Welcome to Fitzroy Island – Ten couples arrive in Far North Queensland and meet Ajay Rochester on the beach before boarding a boat. En route, a letter reveals one partner must row a canoe to the destination. Those remaining on the boat are greeted by The Commando, who puts them through a gruelling beach workout, with Tania struggling the most. Meanwhile, Sammy battles seasickness but pushes through on the canoe. The canoe arrives and the couples are reunited before heading through the forest to Hunt Resort. Once settled, they receive a letter instructing them to “say goodbye to old friends” and are blindfolded for their Last Supper. Presented with their favourite unhealthy foods, all contestants show strong unity by refusing to eat and discarding their meals. Michelle and Shannan join them, expressing pride and taking time to get to know the couples. The next day, the contestants prepare for their first weigh-in.	1,156,000,
2/01-2	Monday, 2 February	The First Weigh-in – At the first weigh-in, emotions run high as the couples face the scales for the first time. Individual weights range from Mel at 102 kg to Sharif at 178.3 kg. Holly and Mel are the lightest couple at a combined 210.8 kg, while Amanda and Stewart are the heaviest at 306.8 kg. Amanda is revealed as the heaviest woman ever on The Biggest Loser, weighing 170.4 kg.	923,000
3/01-3	Tuesday, 3 February	The Warehouse #1 (Island Edition) – Chicken / Eggs – The contestants begin their first beach training session, each trainer observing five couples they may choose to coach. Bob is the first to require medical attention but refuses to quit, while Michelle is impressed by Sharif’s effort and frustrated by Holly’s lack of motivation. Amanda opens up about her past struggles with drug addiction. The trainers then split the couples, assigning them team colours. Michelle takes Cameron and Sammy (red), Nathan and Andrew (light blue), Bob and Tiffany (grey), Holly and Mel (yellow), and Tania and Ramses (brown). Shannan takes Ben and Sean (green), Teresa and Sharif (orange), Meaghan and Julie (dark blue), Stewart and Amanda (purple), and Jeda and Jodi (pink). The contestants mark the moment at a bonfire, burning their training shirts as a commitment to change. The next morning, they face their first Warehouse challenge at the pier. Given the choice between chicken and eggs, the contestants unanimously choose eggs, believing they will be easier to manage and prepare.	1,019,000
4/01-4	Wednesday, 4 February	Temptation #1 – Race to the Platters – Michelle and Shannan are pleased with the Warehouse decision and give their teams a nutrition lesson along with calorie books. Training tests the couples’ partnerships—Ben suffers a drop in blood sugar, while Amanda breaks down but pushes through, running up a hill while pulling Stewart. At the first Temptation, six platters are revealed: five with high-calorie foods (lollies, cheesecake, chocolate éclair, chocolate cake, and burger with chips) and one with immunity. The contestants initially hold strong as platters are removed, starting from the highest calories. With only the lollies and immunity remaining, Nathan and Andrew make their move, grabbing both platters. Andrew secures immunity for their team, immediately putting a target on the brothers as the others begin to question their gameplay.	867,000
5/01-5	Thursday, 5 February	The Walk #1 – Andrew & Nathan - Andrew and Nathan head out on the Walk as Michelle and Shannan learn about the Temptation twist. Michelle surprises everyone by supporting the brothers’ decision. Back in training, tensions rise as Mel looks to get payback on Holly, Bob struggles physically, and Shannan puts extra focus on Sean. On the Walk, Andrew and Nathan are presented with two game-changing bracelets: a gold “$$” bracelet worth double prize money ($400,000) and a silver “nothing” bracelet, meaning the holder would win no prize money. The twist will remain in play for the entire game, with eliminated players passing the bracelets on. They must assign the bracelets to others. After deliberation, they give the “nothing” bracelet to Meaghan, who insists she is not there for the money, and the “$$” bracelet to Holly to motivate her. Holly is unconvinced, feeling it instead puts a target on her back.	923,000
6/01-6	Friday, 6 February	Challenge #1 – Bucket Loads of Trouble – The couples head to the beach for their first challenge, where one partner must balance on a wooden block while holding two 30-litre buckets, while the other collects seawater and fills opponents’ buckets. The more water added, the harder it becomes to balance. The last couple standing wins a 3 kg advantage at the weigh-in, or, if Light Blue wins, can award it to another couple. Yellow is targeted first and drops out, angering Mel, followed by Brown, Grey, Green, Orange, Purple and Red. Dark Blue is eliminated next, leaving Light Blue and Pink as the final two, with neither having received any water. Nathan begins deliberately filling Andrew’s buckets to help keep him balanced, confusing the other contestants.	814,000
Week 2
7/02-1	Sunday, 8 February	Weigh-in #1 – The challenge continued with only the Pink and Light Blue teams remaining. Jeda eventually dropped, giving Light Blue the win. Jeda then confronted Cameron for saying that Andrew and Nathan were “in love with him”, taking the comment personally as she is married. Jodi and Sammy defended their teammates, while back at the house, Jodi worried that they were now targets. Before last-chance training, the trainers heard about the challenge, including the blowout between the Red and Pink teams. During Shannan’s session, the Green team repeatedly became sick. In Michelle’s session, Sammy became upset over her father’s outburst at the challenge. Michelle confronted Cameron, pointing out how much his daughter wanted to be there. Ramses continued to struggle with his back injury. At the weigh-in, Light Blue gave their 3 kg advantage to Pink, who had finished second in the challenge. Mel was asked how long it would take her to forgive her sister, upsetting Holly and shocking the other contestants. Grey recorded the highest combined weight-loss percentage at 6.93%, with Bob, the oldest contestant, recording the highest individual percentage at 7.63%. Yellow and Brown fell below the yellow line and would face elimination.	840,000
8/02-2	Monday, 9 February	Elimination #1 – Ramses & Tania – Back at the house, the Grey team are congratulated on their weight loss, with many contestants astonished by Bob’s 12.8 kg loss. Tania fears that she and Ramses will go home, as Ramses’ ability to lose weight despite his bad back makes them a threat. Holly feels targeted because of her gold bracelet, which scares Mel. The couples struggle with the decision over who to eliminate, but ultimately, the Brown team are eliminated. Two months on: Ramses has lost 15.9 kg, while Tania has lost 11.7 kg. Their relationship is stronger than ever, and they look forward to starting a family.	865,000
9/02-3	Tuesday, 10 February	Challenge #2 – Race to Camp Biggest Loser – Holly breaks down after the elimination, though some contestants still doubt her commitment. The next day, Ajay meets the contestants on the beach and reveals their next challenge: a 2.5 km race from Fitzroy Island to Sydney, with the first couple to arrive winning immunity. The race is divided into several stages.: Stage 1 – Fitzroy Island: The couples row paddle boats to one of four forms of transport to Cairns: a speedboat, seaplane, fishing boat or sailing boat. The fishing boat can carry two couples, while the sailing boat can carry three and will not leave until full.; Stage 2 – Cairns: After reaching the mainland, the couples must run 3 km to Cairns Airport. They receive maps for the run and must carry their bags of sand with them.; Stage 3 – Flight to Sydney: The couples fly from Cairns to Sydney in the order they reach the airport.; Stage 4 – Sydney: After landing, the race continues across Sydney.; The couples are met with two train passes, two bus passes, two ferry passes, two $20 notes and a sign reading “Manly or Bust”. The sand bags must also be carried, with their significance to be revealed later. Yellow and Light Blue take an early lead in Stage 1 and choose the seaplane, leaving first. Dark Blue and Green take the fishing boat, leaving second, with Pink close behind and angry at being beaten. Red, Pink and Grey take the sailing boat, leaving third, while Purple reaches the speedboat before all three. Orange arrives last, however, meaning the speedboat ultimately leaves last. In Stage 2, the seaplane arrives first, followed by the fishing boat, although Green and Blue initially miss their maps and have to return. Yellow and Light Blue reach the airport first and second, followed by Green, Blue, Pink, Grey, Red, Orange and Purple. For Stage 4, Light Blue grabs the “Manly or Bust” sign, putting their faith in themselves. Yellow initially takes the bus passes but, unfamiliar with Sydney, swaps them for money to buy train tickets. Green takes the ferry, Dark Blue the bus, Pink and Grey the train, while Red takes the money. Orange and Purple are the last to reach the table.	979,000
10/02-4	Wednesday, 11 February	Welcome to Camp Biggest Loser – Orange takes the $20, while Purple takes the ferry pass. Orange uses their money to catch the airport shuttle to the Northern Beaches, which also picks up Red. Light Blue manages to get a ride directly from the airport to Manly, while the other contestants scramble for money to find any available transport and keep themselves in the race. Light Blue wins the race easily, earning immunity for the second consecutive week. Orange finishes second, Red third, Pink fourth, Grey fifth, Green sixth, Yellow seventh, Purple eighth and Dark Blue last, with Julie pushed to the point of vomiting. The couples arrive at their new home, Camp Biggest Loser, where Ajay greets them. They are asked to place their bags of sand on the scales, revealing that Blue will receive a 2 kg penalty at the next weigh-in for finishing last. The contestants enter camp and discover their dream outfits, an industrial-sized kitchen, multiple workout rooms, photos from the first three seasons, a leaderboard and a locked case containing $400,000 in cash.	892,000
11/02-5	Thursday, 12 February	The Walk #2 – Andrew & Nathan -The trainers arrive at Camp Biggest Loser, seeing the contestants for the first time since last-chance training. Michelle is upset to discover that Tania and Ramses are gone, but is pleased with the results from the weigh-in. The trainers are also filled in on the race and sense Julie’s disappointment over Dark Blue finishing last. The trainers surprise the contestants with a walk to the big gym and weigh-in room, going straight into training. Mel struggles greatly, while Julie has a fire lit under her. The medic pulls Shannan aside to discuss Amanda, who has been experiencing tremendous calf pain but had not told Shannan. Amanda is taken off-site and scanned for deep vein thrombosis (DVT). Michelle confronts Cameron about his negative attitude but ultimately brings him and his daughter together. She later visits the kitchen to discuss their diet and introduces the Biggest Loser Online Club to help them track their calories. Shannan then informs Stewart that Amanda will spend the night in hospital after doctors find two DVT clots in her leg. The couple speak on the phone, with Amanda tearfully expressing that she does not want to leave the competition. Nathan and Andrew head out on the Walk, where Ajay presents them with four water vessels, each containing the names of two couples. They must choose between the two couples on each vessel to give one team double voting power at the next elimination. The pairs are Jodi & Jeda and Holly & Mel, among others. After speaking to each couple individually, Nathan and Andrew decide to give the double vote to the Yellow team.	968,000
12/02-6	Friday, 13 February	Challenge #3 – Brain Strain – The trainers arrive at camp and hear about the Walk. Michelle leads her team through a spin session, where Cameron struggles once again. Shannan punishes the Green team for sleeping in by putting them through an extra training session. Ajay then meets the couples on the lawn for the next challenge. One person from each couple must run or walk on a treadmill while their partner answers multiple-choice nutrition questions. For every incorrect answer, their partner’s treadmill speed increases by 1 km/h. If a contestant’s safety cord comes out, they are eliminated. Stewart is unable to compete because Amanda remains in hospital. The winning couple will receive letters from home. Grey are eliminated first, followed by Dark Blue. Pink go out third, Red fourth and Light Blue fifth.	858,000
Week 3
13/03-1	Sunday, 15 February	Weigh-in #2: – An emotional Yellow team are eliminated in sixth place, followed by Orange, giving Green their first challenge win. Before opening their letters, Ben and Sean are asked to decide which other competitors should receive letters from home. They ultimately choose to give everyone their letters, sending emotions running high across the camp. Amanda receives word that her DVT has cleared and returns to camp, but within 24 hours, she is back in hospital with an arm injury. After last-chance training, Amanda returns again with a soft-tissue injury. Shannan pulls her aside to review her medical guidelines, but confirms that she is still in the game. At the weigh-in, it is revealed that Cameron missed his daughter’s wedding, causing both him and Sammy to break down in tears. For the second consecutive week, Grey record the highest team weight-loss percentage at 4.05%, with Bob again recording the highest individual percentage at 4.90%. Pink and Dark Blue fall below the yellow line and face elimination. Without the 2 kg penalty, Red would have taken Dark Blue’s place.	1,052,000
14/03-2	Monday, 16 February	Elimination #2 – Jodi & Jeda – The Yellow team struggle with their double vote, as both Dark Blue and Pink plead to stay in the game. Light Blue, who gave Yellow the voting power, want them to eliminate Dark Blue because of their alliance with Pink. In the elimination room, Yellow shockingly go against Light Blue’s wishes and vote out Pink. Their double vote is enough to send Pink home. Nathan voices his disappointment in Holly and Mel for voting them out. Holly defends their decision, while Jodi reminds her that they kept Holly and her sister in the game the previous week. Two months on: Jodi has lost 23.5 kg and Jeda 18 kg. They have much more energy for their kids and are excited about the future of their families.	940,000
15/03-3	Tuesday, 17 February	The Commando Takes Over – After the elimination, Nathan expresses his anger over Jodi and Jeda’s departure. Holly is upset about being attacked, but Nathan stands by his words. The other couples discuss Light Blue’s gameplaying tactics, leaving the brothers feeling vulnerable. They devise a new plan to stay in the game and sabotage Yellow. Cameron and Sammy are presented with a DVD of their daughter’s and sister’s wedding. The trainers then arrive at camp, with Shannan particularly shattered by Pink’s elimination. During Michelle’s group session, Nathan and Holly argue again, ending with Nathan storming out. Shannan puts his team through a rugby training session, which leaves Meaghan needing oxygen and unable to continue.Michelle has her group train individually, allowing Nathan, Mel and Holly to release their emotions. Afterwards, she pulls Nathan aside, and he breaks down over his need for control. The contestants receive a letter announcing that one person must leave camp for a “change of scenery”, upsetting some of the couples. Ben, Mel, Julie, Sammy, Sharif, Stewart and Tiffany head to the forest, where The Commando leads them through a team obstacle course. Julie struggles the most, and The Commando dismisses everyone except Mel and Sharif, the smallest losers of the group.	909,000
16/03-4	Wednesday, 18 February	Temptation #2 – Wooden Spoon – The contestants return to camp at 1:00 am, wet and dirty, leaving the others shocked that The Commando kept Mel and Sharif. Holly is upset to be separated from her sister, while Teresa believes the experience will be good for Sharif. The next morning, the trainers arrive, and Julie is still recovering from the night before. Holly releases her anger during training, while Mel and Sharif find solace in their sessions with The Commando. Ajay then gathers the contestants, excluding Mel and Sharif, for a temptation challenge. Two couples face off at the kitchen table, where a doughnut awaits. If a contestant grabs the wooden spoon within 60 seconds, their team must eat the doughnut. The winning couple chooses who faces the next challenge. Light Blue, currently holding immunity, chooses Green to face them first. They are presented with a mini cinnamon doughnut containing 70 calories. Despite initially agreeing not to play, Sean grabs the spoon as soon as Ajay flips the hourglass, ending Light Blue’s immunity streak. As more couples take their turns and the doughnuts increase in calories, nobody else plays. The Green team therefore win immunity and the Walk. The contestants are then treated to a special surprise. After being named Biggest Loser for two consecutive weeks, Bob is visited by his family: his granddaughter (Tiffany’s daughter), son (Tiffany’s husband) and wife. Bob and Tiffany are rewarded with a day release from camp to spend time with their family, and they enjoy the rest of the day at the beach.	848,000
17/03-5	Thursday, 19 February	The Walk #3 – Ben & Sean – The Green team head out on The Walk, while Sharif breaks down during training with The Commando. Michelle is proud that none of her contestants played the temptation, and the Light Blue team admit they did not want The Walk this week. She is also moved to hear about the Grey team's family visit. Meanwhile, Shannan leads his training group through a spin session. The contestants show their trainers their dream outfits, revealing that Sammy has never worn a pair of jeans and Andrew wants to become a policeman. When the Green team meet Ajay, they are presented with two water vessels. The chosen disc will give them the power to decide who receives either the double bracelet or the nothing bracelet, forcing Holly or Meaghan to give up their respective bracelet. Sean chooses the double bracelet disc. After consulting with Red, Holly and each other, the Green team narrow their choice down to Sammy, Tiffany and Sean. Ultimately, Tiffany receives the double bracelet.	884,000
18/03-6	Friday, 20 February	Challenge #4 – Sand Dunes – Michelle and Shannan arrive at camp and learn about The Walk, motivating Tiffany to push even harder. Shannan leads his group through a session designed to test their mental strength. Ajay then meets the contestants on the beach for a challenge involving a 60-metre sand dune. Holly and Amanda are unable to compete due to injuries, so the remaining couples must choose one person each to participate. The seven competitors are divided into two teams, captained by Stewart and Sean as the biggest losers among the competitors. Stewart chooses Nathan, Teresa and Cameron, while Sean chooses Meaghan and Tiffany. Round 1: Each team is tied together side-by-side, one metre apart, and must carry 7.5 kg bags of sand to the top of the dune and drop them into a pit. Each contestant must carry four bags. Sean, Meaghan and Tiffany win easily, while the remaining contestants are given a second chance. Untied, they race individually while carrying a sandbag. Nathan and Stewart are neck-and-neck, but Nathan wins, earning a place in the final race. Round 2: Nathan and Tiffany face Sean and Meaghan. Each team must deliver six 15 kg sandbags to the top of the dune. Nathan and Tiffany win, eliminating Sean and Meaghan. Final Round: Nathan and Tiffany must individually carry two 20 kg sandbags each.	798,000
Week 4
19/04-1	Sunday, 22 February	Weigh-in #3 – Nathan wins the final round, earning Light Blue a 1 kg advantage at the weigh-in. He then goes back down the dune to help Tiffany finish. Mel and Sharif have their best training session yet with The Commando. Michelle and Shannan arrive at camp, where Holly is devastated to reveal that she has a hip injury that could take her out of the competition. Amanda admits to Shannan that she has slipped back into her old eating habits. Training ends with a tug-of-war, with Shannan’s group beating Michelle’s two rounds to one. Mel and Sharif return just in time for the weigh-in. Cameron and Sammy both break down in tears when Ajay asks Cameron whether he is losing weight to save his marriage. For the third consecutive week, Bob is named Biggest Loser of the week, the first player ever to be Biggest Loser 3 weeks in a row. The Grey team once again recorded the highest team weight-loss percentage, 4.34%. The Yellow and Purple teams fall below the yellow line and face elimination. Ajay asks Amanda, who has lost just 0.7 kg, to sing. She initially says she cannot, but finds the strength to perform.	1,073,000
20/04-2	Monday, 23 February	Elimination #3 – Amanda & Stewart – Holly and Mel say that Amanda and Stewart need to be in the competition far more than they do, while the other couples struggle with their decision. In the elimination room, Stewart reveals that it is his and Amanda’s anniversary. The six couples reach a hung vote, and because Purple have the lowest weight-loss percentage, Amanda and Stewart are eliminated. Amanda calls Sammy out for voting against them, saying, “It’s all about the game.” After the Purple team leave the room, Ajay reveals that there is one more vote for the contestants to make. Each couple has one hour to cast a vote for the couple they want eliminated, with every couple at risk. Two months on: Stewart has lost 20 kg and Amanda 22 kg. They look forward to sharing a long, healthy life together with their family.	1,034,000
21/04-3	Tuesday, 24 February	An Elimination Twist / The Warehouse #2 – Takeaway or $5 a Day – After the elimination, the remaining couples have mixed emotions about voting another couple out. Some are looking forward to the gameplay, while others worry that they could be next. Nathan and Andrew receive the most votes, but Ajay reveals that they will not be eliminated. Instead, they will face the remaining six couples at the weigh-in. If Light Blue win, they will have the sole vote at the next elimination. They also get to choose one trainer to work with exclusively, choosing Michelle and leaving the other six couples to train with Shannan. After training, the contestants are shocked to discover that the refrigerator has been padlocked and all the food has been removed. A letter summons them to the Warehouse, where Ajay reveals their two options: takeaway or a $5-per-day food budget. The Light Blue team get to choose their own option and select the $5 budget, leaving the remaining couples with takeaway for the week. Ben is angry about the twist, but Sharif reminds him that it is a learning opportunity. Back at camp, the Green team remain frustrated but eventually realise they can still make healthy choices. Meanwhile, the Light Blue team struggle with their limited budget but put what they have learned into practice.	969,000
22/04-4	Wednesday, 25 February	Temptation #3 – All Things Italian – Andrew learns that he has a stress fracture in his knee, concerning Michelle. The contestants are then instructed to leave camp and meet Ajay for temptation. The Light Blue are revealed to be ineligible for immunity and unable to play, which upsets them but relieves the other couples. If nobody played, nobody would receive immunity, but Light Blue would gain the power of The Walk. The temptation is also individual, meaning the couples cannot discuss strategy. The contestants are presented with a variety of Italian foods. Sharif eats chicken parmigiana for 550 calories, while Teresa and Holly each eat a slice of vegetarian pizza for 180 calories. Nobody else plays. With a combined total of 730 calories, the Orange team win immunity and The Walk. The next day, Ajay meets the contestants on the parade ground to reveal Bob’s reward for being named Biggest Loser for the third consecutive week. Bob generously chooses to give the prize to Nathan, allowing him to see his children and partner, Alicia.	939,000
23/04-5	Thursday, 26 February	The Walk #4 – Teresa & Sharif – Michelle is elated to hear about Nathan’s day with his family, while Shannan understands Teresa and Sharif’s decision to play temptation. The teams take part in training before testing how they are progressing with the Warehouse. The Orange take The Walk and are shocked to learn that both discs will be pulled. Sharif’s disc gives them the power to choose one couple to experience pleasure, while Teresa’s allows them to choose a couple to experience pain. When they return to camp, Orange reveal that they have given the pleasure to Dark Blue and the pain to Yellow. Holly and Mel take the decision personally, although Sharif denies that it was intended that way. Meaghan and Julie are rewarded with one-hour massages, while Holly and Mel are blindfolded and led into a cage, where they meet Emazon. Mel struggles towards the end but eventually completes the challenge.	914,000
24/04-6	Friday, 27 February	Challenge #5 – A Water Challenge – Shannan and Michelle learn about The Walk, while Holly and Mel remain sworn to secrecy about Emazon. When they return to camp, Shannan has his team work together with Orange. The next day, Ajay meets the contestants at the pool for their challenge. Contestants must cross a balance beam spanning the pool, retrieve a 10 kg water balloon and return it to their rack. The team with the most balloons after 90 minutes wins. Anyone who falls into the water must swim back and start again. The losing team will be denied access to the gym, equipment and trainers until after the weigh-in. Because of Andrew’s injury, Nathan has to compete alone. Both teams struggle tremendously, but Nathan eventually finds a strategy and dominates the challenge, beating the remaining contestants 10–1. Sean is the only other contestant to successfully return a balloon.	749,000
Week 5
25/05-1	Sunday, 1 March	Weigh-in #4 – When the trainers arrive at camp after the challenge, Shannan is gutted to learn that he will not be available for last-chance training. He is also concerned about Holly. Michelle praises Nathan and Andrew after last-chance training, while the remaining six couples work together outside, led by the Green and Dark Blue teams. Shannan pulls Holly aside, and she tearfully admits that she is struggling with motivation. Green call a meeting with the other couples, expressing their concerns that Holly is not pulling her weight and fearing that they could be eliminated if they lose the weigh-in. At the weigh-in, Ajay reveals that if Light Blue lose, the remaining six couples will have the power to vote either Nathan or Andrew out. Light Blue weigh in first, recording an impressive 4.91% loss. Despite strong numbers, the remaining six couples combine for 4.88%, only losing by 200 grams. Sean is named Biggest Loser of the week with a 7.61% loss, while Green record the highest team percentage at 6.81%.	1,062,000
26/05-2	Monday, 2 March	Elimination #4 – Ben & Sean – The Light Blue team are overjoyed to have won the weigh-in. Green plead their case to stay, as do Grey. With the only vote, Light Blue choose to eliminate Green, sending Ben and Sean home. The pair bow out gracefully, leaving the elimination room with two final words: “No Regrets.” Ajay then reveals that the yellow line will return next week. Two months on: Sean has lost 30.7 kg and Ben has lost 34 kg. They hope to play baseball together in the first team soon and look forward to hitting many more home runs for years to come.	1,048,000
27/05-3	Tuesday, 3 March	The Warehouse #3 – Raw food / Straw food – The mood in the house is strained following Ben and Sean’s elimination, particularly after seeing the Biggest Losers sent home. Michelle’s remaining couples trick her into believing that Light Blue have been eliminated, but she is thrilled when Nathan and Andrew walk into the kitchen and even more impressed by their weigh-in results. Shannan is disappointed by the Green team’s elimination, especially after Sean was named Biggest Loser. Michelle takes her group through a dodgeball session, with the couples competing against each other. The contestants then learn their biological ages, leaving many of them shocked by the results. At the Warehouse, the teams are presented with two crates: raw food, where nothing can be cooked, and straw food, where everything must be consumed through a straw. The Orange team, who were the biggest losers remaining behind the eliminated Green team, are given the choice. Teresa and Sharif choose raw food for themselves, leaving the remaining couples with straw food.	988,000
28/05-4	Wednesday, 4 March	Temptation #4 – Milkshake Wars – The trainers arrive at camp and give the contestants suggestions for coping with the Warehouse diets. Shannan takes his training group through a session pulling his car, while Michelle leads her team through a circuit. The contestants are then taken to Manly Beach for temptation. Each contestant is blindfolded and placed at one of two tables, with the couples separated. In front of them is a 3-litre strawberry-banana milkshake containing 3,000 calories. Whoever drinks the most within 20 minutes wins immunity and the power of The Walk. If nobody plays, Orange will retain their immunity from the previous week. Teresa, Sharif and Sammy choose not to play. Light Blue win with a combined 4,375 calories, with Nathan drinking the entire milkshake. They earn immunity and The Walk for the third time. Tiffany then spots a DVD from the Green team. Sean reveals that he has passed on his family reward, allowing the prize to go to Julie instead. The contestants head outside to find Julie’s eldest daughter, who recently celebrated her birthday, along with her mum, husband and grandchildren.	962,000
29/05-5	Thursday, 5 March	The Walk #5 – Andrew & Nathan – The trainers arrive at camp and learn about the temptation. Michelle is particularly angry with her team for playing, especially Cameron, who says he only wanted a taste. Nathan embraces Michelle’s wrath, while Cameron is confronted by her. He opens up about his wife threatening to leave him if he does not lose weight. Nathan and Andrew head out on The Walk, where they are greeted by four vessels and the eliminated contestants in white shirts. Ajay reveals that two eliminated couples will be given a second chance. Nathan and Andrew each select a disc containing the name of an eliminated couple. Andrew’s disc reveals Ben and Sean, while Nathan’s reveals Amanda and Stewart. Ajay then revelas that each selected couple must choose between themselves which one person will return to the competition, creating two “odd couples”. The Light Blue team then reveal the twist to the rest of the camp, with Amanda and Sean returning as the new Odd Couple.	1,022,000
30/05-6	Friday, 6 March	Challenge #6 – Towers of Tuna – The trainers are shocked and excited to see Amanda and Sean back in the game and learn about The Walk. Michelle feels the anger of her training group now that Amanda and Sean have returned. Andrew is medically cleared from his injuries, while Shannan reassesses Amanda’s fitness. At the challenge, Ajay presents each couple with 10,000 tins of [[Safcol]] tuna — 8,800 packed in trays and 1,200 loose tins, weighing one tonne in total. Each couple must move the tins 50 metres down the wharf using only their hands, then recreate their original tower. The first couple to finish and have their torwer stand for 60 seconds wins $10,000. Due to Andrew’s injury, he is limited to stacking duties. The Yellow team work together effectively and establish a solid lead, with Light Blue not far behind.	720,000
Week 6
31/06-1	Sunday, 8 March	The Weigh-in #5 – Despite their tower structure weakening, the Yellow team manage to win the challenge and the $10,000 prize. During the challenge, Nathan collapses and requires medical attention. The next morning, the trainers arrive, with Michelle thrilled and shocked to learn that Yellow won. During last-chance training, Shannan puts the weight back on his group, which becomes particularly emotional for Amanda. Michelle splits her couples up for a workout similar to their first session on Fitzroy Island, allowing them to reflect on how far they have come. At the weigh-in, Ajay reveals that Sean and Amanda will be granted immunity, although they will still have a vote at elimination. Holly admits that she and Mel want to go home, believing that the other contestants need the opportunity more than they do. Sure enough, the Yellow team fall below the yellow line alongside the Dark Blue team. For the fourth time in five weeks, Bob is named Biggest Loser of the week, losing 6.44% of his body weight. The Grey team record the highest combined percentage at 5.86%.	1,094,000
32/06-2	Monday, 9 March	Elimination #5 – Holly & Mel – Tensions run high after the weigh-in, as Holly and Mel plead to be eliminated, but Nathan is angry with them. Michelle visits camp while the Yellow team are packing and tries to convince the sisters to reconsider. In the elimination room, the sisters’ wishes are ultimately honoured and the Yellow team are eliminated from the game. Holly and Mel are happy to leave as best friends, just as they promised they would. Two months on: Holly has lost 28 kg and Mel has lost 22 kg. They are getting on better than ever and plan to spend more time shopping together.	1,047,000
33/06-3	Tuesday, 10 March	The Warehouse #4 – Cycle for Your Supper – Both trainers feel that Holly and Mel will regret their decision to leave. Shannan takes his team through a martial arts session, with Julie slipping back into her old self-doubt. He also checks in on the contestants’ online food diaries. The next morning, the contestants receive a letter telling them they must cycle for their supper. All the food has been removed from camp, and every kilometre clocked on the spin bikes earns them 10 cents towards their food budget for the week. Cameron storms off and refuses to participate, frustrating the other contestants. The trainers arrive at camp and learn about the Warehouse twist. They set up a challenge to see how fast each contestant can pedal in one minute, turning it into a fun competition while giving them another chance to earn money towards their food budget.	959,000
34/06-4	Wednesday, 11 March	Temptation #5 – Chocolate Poker – The contestants continue spinning through the night in two-hour shifts. On the parade grounds, Bob is taken away in a limousine after receiving a letter revealing that he will be going home for 24 hours to meet his newborn grandson. Michelle finally comes to terms with Holly and Mel’s decision to leave, while Sammy and Amanda both break down over their struggles with self-loathing. The contestants then face temptation at a poker table covered in chocolate. Each contestant is invited to place a bet using chocolate, with the next player required to match and raise the previous calorie total. Anyone who passes is eliminated from the game. The last contestant remaining must eat everything they have bet to win immunity and the power of The Walk. Ajay reveals that only one individual, rather than a couple, can win. Only Nathan and Andrew play, with Nathan winning after betting 124 calories. Bob returns to camp and shares stories and photos from his home visit, including his first meeting with his newborn grandson.	1,000,0g0
35/06-5	Thursday, 12 March	The Walk #6 – Nathan/Red vs Blue – The trainers arrive at camp and learn about the temptation, while Michelle is excited to hear about Bob’s trip home. Shannan is proud that none of his group played. After training, Shannan checks how his group are managing the Warehouse, while Michelle talks to the women about fat. Nathan heads out on his fourth Walk, but his first alone. Ajay reveals that the contestants will no longer compete as couples, but as two teams: Red vs Blue. Nathan is presented with two water vessels. One gives him the power to choose another couple to split and use them to form the teams, while the other would split Nathan and Andrew and have them captain separate teams. Nathan chooses the first option. After discussing it with Andrew and the other contestants, Nathan decides to split the Dark Blue team, sending Julie to Blue and Meaghan to Red. Nathan allows Julie to pick first. Blue: Julie, Sean, Andrew, Bob, Teresa and Tiffany Red: Meaghan, Nathan, Sharif, Amanda, Sammy and Cameron	1,073,000
36/06-6	Friday, 13 March	Challenge #7 – Relay Race At Royal Randwick – The trainers arrive at camp and are shocked to see the newly formed Red and Blue teams. Teresa reveals to Shannan that she has an inflamed Achilles tendon and is unable to train, while Cameron falls off the treadmill but manages to get himself back up. The contestants meet Ajay at Royal Randwick Racecourse for their challenge. Each team member must run a 420-metre leg of a relay, returning to the starting point before passing the baton. The teams complete four laps, with the fifth and final lap changing the rules: instead of passing the baton, the runner must collect their teammates and cross the finish line together. Teresa is unable to compete due to her injury, while Red choose Cameron to sit out. Michelle and Shannan are present to support their teams. The winning team will receive phone calls home.	823,000
Week 7
37/07-1	Sunday, 15 March	The Weigh-in #6 – During the final lap, Sammy repeatedly stops to hold onto the rail. Despite Red leading for most of the race, Blue surge ahead to win the challenge and earn phone calls home. Michelle and Shannan take the contestants to the beach for last-chance training, with Michelle being particularly hard on Cameron. At the first weigh-in as teams, the trainers are once again present. Sammy breaks down in tears, feeling that she has not changed, while Cameron admits that he does not want to go home but does not want to be there either. Blue win the weigh-in with a combined 3.15% loss, beating Red’s 2.26%. Amanda sings on the scales once again as she becomes the first woman to be named Biggest Loser of the week, losing 4.49% of her body weight.	1,184,000
38/07-2	Monday, 16 March	Elimination #6 – Amanda – The contestants leave the weigh-in room deflated, with four contestants losing less than 2 kg. Blue celebrate their victory while Red decide who to eliminate. The decision comes down to Amanda and Sharif, with Meaghan caught in the middle. Amanda is voted out unanimously, eliminating her for the second time. She is upset but not surprised, particularly disappointed by Sharif’s vote. She knew the others would eliminate her at the first opportunity. Sharif defends his decision, saying he did not want to create hung vote and leave the decision to the Blue team. Two months on, Amanda has lost 42.5 kg and spends hours playing with her two daughters.	1,033,000
39/07-3	Tuesday, 17 March	The Warehouse #5 – Dine In / Dine Out/Emazon Returns – Michelle is unhappy not to see Amanda when she arrives at camp and gives Cameron an ultimatum about whether he wants to stay. She also presents her team with new shirts. Shannan takes Blue through a capoeira session, while Michelle takes Red to train with a gymnastics coach. Ajay meets the contestants on the parade ground for the Warehouse and gives them two options: dine in or dine out, with no further details. Sean, the second Biggest Loser behind the eliminated Amanda, is given the power to decide which team gets each option. After conferring with his teammates, he chooses “dine in” for the Blue team, leaving Red with “dine out”. A truck arrives with Blue’s food: frozen meals. The Red team are taken off-site to a boxing gym, where they watch a video of Emazon working with Holly and Mel several weeks earlier before Emazon herself appears. She tells the Red team that they must fight for their food, with each contestant taking a turn in the ring to earn a type of food. Afterwards, they are again sworn to secrecy about Emazon before returning to camp with their food.	1,053,000
40/07-4	Wednesday, 18 March	Temptation #6 – Favourite Foods – The trainers arrive at camp and learn about the Warehouse, but the Red team keeps Emazon a secret. Shannan is unhappy about Blue’s frozen meals but proud of their nutritional knowledge. Meanwhile, the Red team impresses Michelle during training, particularly Cameron, while Shannan pushes the Blue team hard ahead of Temptation. Ajay meets the contestants at a table recreating their Last Supper on Fitzroy Island, when they refused to eat their favourite foods. This time, each contestant faces their favourite meal, worth 1,000 calories. They have 15 minutes to eat the entire dish. If more than one person plays, a second round featuring dessert will follow. If nobody plays, Nathan retains his immunity and the power of the Walk for the third consecutive week and the fifth time this season. As the 15 minutes begin, curtains drop between the contestants. Sharif is the only one to play, finishing his butter chicken and earning immunity and the power of the Walk for the second time. With Amanda having been eliminated after earning Biggest Loser of the Week, there is no family visit this week. Instead, all contestants are visited by Season 3 alumni Sam, Alison and Cosi. Alison leads the women in an emotional exercise, asking them to look at themselves in the mirror and compliment one another’s bodies. The visit concludes with a boys-versus-girls game of touch football, with Shannan and Michelle joining in.	1,048,000
41/07-5	Thursday, 19 March	The Walk #7 – Sharif – The trainers learn about Temptation. Shannan is proud of Blue for resisting, while Michelle is disappointed that Sharif played but pleased that everyone burned 1,000 calories alongside him. Despite this, she makes Sharif pay for his temptation. Shannan leads Blue through a training session that demonstrates just how much stronger they have become. As Sharif leaves for the Walk, Shannan shows the team photographs illustrating the risk factors for heart disease. Meanwhile, Sammy begins to develop a more positive body image. Sharif meets Ajay for the Walk and is given two options involving the double and nothing bracelets: choose one for himself, or choose one to give to another contestant. He selects the latter, shocking the others by deciding to speak to Nathan first, ahead of his partner, Teresa, double-bracelet holder Tiffany, and nothing-bracelet holder Meaghan. Nathan reveals that he wants the double bracelet, while neither Meaghan nor Tiffany is willing to give up theirs. Sharif ultimately reveals his decision: Teresa will receive the double bracelet.	998,000
42/07-6	Friday, 20 March	Challenge #8 – Brain vs Brawn – The trainers learn the outcome of the Walk before leading their teams through competitive training sessions. At the challenge, Ajay introduces a nutritional knowledge quiz. One contestant from each team will act as the “brain”, answering questions, while the remaining members serve as the “brawn”, holding a large disc upright. Every incorrect answer adds a 10 kg bag of wheat to the answering team’s disc, while a correct answer adds one to the opposing team’s disc. If neither contestant answers, both teams receive a bag. The first team to drop its disc loses. With six members compared to Red’s five, Blue chooses to sit Julie out. Cameron represents Red as the brain, while Teresa takes the role for Blue. Cameron initially struggles, quickly loading Red’s disc with 70 kg of wheat. However, he begins to turn things around, and Blue’s disc reaches 50 kg.	947,000
Week 8
43/08-1	Sunday, 22 March	Weigh-in #7 – The Red team eventually buckles under 90 kg, handing Blue their second consecutive challenge victory. Their reward is the power to choose which of their own team will sit out the weigh-in. When the trainers learn the result, Michelle remarks that Sharif would have been the best choice as Red’s “brain”. She then leads her team through Last Chance Training, built around the number 138—the total kilograms Red has lost. Meanwhile, Shannan notices a significant change in Julie, who asks him to stop calling her “Mum”. Before the weigh-in, the show revisits the first eliminated couple, Tania and Ramses, during a photoshoot. Blue chooses Andrew to sit out the weigh-in. He supports the decision, noting his struggles with the frozen food, but his brother Nathan disagrees. Blue records a 4.27% weight loss, or 4.19% with Andrew included. Julie drops below 100 kg, becoming the last remaining woman to reach that milestone. Red loses 3.88%, sending them into elimination for the second consecutive week. Bob’s total weight loss reaches 52.9 kg, surpassing Season 1 winner Adro’s 51.3 kg loss. He is named Biggest Loser of the Week for the 5th time, shedding 5.82% of his body weight. Bob shares an emotional story about quitting hockey when he was younger, hoping to help Cameron, the week’s smallest loser, stop comparing himself with Bob or anyone else.	1,277,000
44/08-2	Monday, 23 March	Elimination #7 – Nathan – Nathan volunteers to go home, believing he can continue his weight-loss journey on the outside and that Cameron needs more time in the competition. Meaghan is conflicted: she is allied with Sammy and Cameron, but recognises Nathan as the stronger player. She even considers forcing a tied vote and leaving the decision to Blue, but ultimately Nathan is eliminated by three votes to Cameron’s two. Before Nathan leaves, Ajay hands him an envelope and sends the remaining Red Team members out of the elimination room. The letter reveals that Nathan must choose another contestant to leave with him, with his decision to be announced the following morning. Ajay clarifies that he can choose anyone from either the Red or Blue Team.	1,047,000
45/08-3	Tuesday, 24 March	Surprise Elimination – Bob/The Castaways – The Red Team emerges from the elimination room, shocking Blue with Nathan’s departure and revealing that he received a letter. Nathan joins the discussion and explains that he must choose someone to leave camp with him. He assures his brother Andrew that he won’t choose him, then discusses his decision with other contestants. Ultimately, Nathan chooses Bob solely to protect Andrew. As the pair leave camp, they are greeted by The Commando and receive a DVD from Ajay revealing that they have not been eliminated. Instead, they will return to Fitzroy Island for five weeks of training with The Commando, becoming “Castaways”. Whoever loses the most weight overall will earn an automatic place in the finale. Back at camp, Shannan is upset by Bob’s departure, but Tiffany is devastated. Michelle is angry about Nathan’s departure and insists on speaking to Meaghan privately. Meaghan explains that her alliance influenced her vote, but Michelle is unimpressed. Michelle puts Red through a session with weighted backpacks. The entire team struggles, and Sammy eventually breaks down and walks away from the treadmill. Meanwhile, Shannan focuses on rebuilding Blue, pushing Tiffany and Andrew particularly hard now that their partners are gone.	1,108,000
46/08-4	Wednesday, 25 March	Temptation #7 – Fortune Cookies – The Castaways arrive back on Fitzroy Island, where The Commando gives Bob and Nathan their white T-shirts before putting them straight into training. Back at camp, morale is low following their departures. Sharif tells Michelle he feels vulnerable and needs to play at Temptation. Michelle later pulls Cameron and Sammy aside to reprimand them about their diets. Michelle and Shannan take the contestants off-site for a training session with the Sydney Swans. Meanwhile, The Commando wakes Bob and Nathan for outdoor training, hauling logs to a clearing. The contestants remaining at camp meet Ajay at a Chinese restaurant for Temptation. Each is given 100 fortune cookies, one of which contains immunity. They have 30 minutes to eat as many cookies as possible, with each cookie worth 25 calories. If nobody finds immunity in the first round, only those who have eaten will advance to the second round. Each contestant will receive one cookie, but only one contains immunity. For the second consecutive week, Sharif is the only contestant to play, eating seven cookies to secure immunity and the power of the Walk. With Bob, the previous week’s Biggest Loser, now away from camp, he once again generously passes on his family reward—the last of the season—to Cameron. Cameron is visited by his newlywed wife and his daughter, Sammy’s older sister, and receives a letter from Bob. He and his wife then enjoy a romantic sunset dinner together.	1,033,000
47/08-5	Thursday, 26 March	The Walk #8 – Sharif – Michelle and Shannan learn about Temptation, with Michelle questioning her team about why Sharif chose to play. Shannan takes Blue to train with firefighters, while Michelle puts Red through a horizontal bungee session. Sharif leaves for the Walk as Michelle checks in with the contestants about their diets, highlighting Cameron and Sammy’s ongoing struggles. Meanwhile, The Commando takes the Castaways on a mountain climb, using the opportunity to learn more about them and how far they have come. On the Walk, Sharif is presented with two options: Red must choose one of its members to swap with Blue, or Blue must choose one of its members to swap with Red. Sharif selects the first option, with the condition that he himself cannot be swapped. In a unanimous decision, Cameron moves to Blue and Andrew joins Red.	1,090,000
48/08-6	Friday, 27 March	Challenge #9 – Dirty Dash – The trainers arrive at camp and learn about the Walk. Both Shannan and Michelle are pleased with their new team members, with Cameron earning Shannan’s respect during his first training session with Blue. At the challenge, Ajay explains that the contestants must race through 100 metres of mud, crawl beneath a cargo net and retrieve a flag. There will always be one fewer flag than contestants, eliminating whoever finishes without one. The rounds continue until one team loses all its members, giving the other team victory and the right to choose which Blue member sits out the weigh-in. Julie is selected to sit out for Blue to even up the teams. Cameron is the first eliminated, followed by Sammy, Sharif, Tiffany, Teresa and Meaghan, leaving only Andrew and Sean to compete in the final round.	900,000
Week 9
49/09-1	Sunday, 29 March	Weigh-in #8 – In a close final round, Sean beats Andrew to secure the challenge victory for Blue. Afterwards, Meaghan drags a clean Julie into the mud bath. Sharif breaks down during Last Chance Training with Michelle, while Shannan takes Blue to a fight gym to work with his trainer. Meanwhile, the transformations of Jodi, Jeda, Amanda and Stewart are revealed at the photoshoot. On Fitzroy Island, the Castaways face their first weigh-in. Both are stunned by their lowest numbers in the competition, disappointing The Commando. Back at camp, Julie is selected to sit out the weigh-in for Blue. Red loses 3.23% of its combined weight, beating Blue’s 2.80% (or 2.50% with Julie included). Cameron, the newest member of Blue, is named Biggest Loser of the Week with a 3.48% weight loss.	1,408,000
50/09-2	Monday, 30 March	Elimination #8 – Teresa – Everyone congratulates Cameron following the weigh-in, while Red celebrates its first victory. In the elimination room, with no clear target, Teresa receives three votes to Tiffany’s two and is eliminated. Julie feels guilty but has made a promise to Bob to look after Tiffany. Before leaving, Teresa must surrender the gold “double” bracelet. She gives it to Cameron, asking him to pass it on to his daughter, Sammy. Two months later, Teresa has lost 36 kg. She is training to compete in triathlons and hopes to become a personal trainer so she can help others.	1,101,000
51/09-3	Tuesday, 31 March	Welcome to Singles / Castaways Revealed – The Commando puts the Castaways through a punishing training session on Nudey Beach before rewarding them with a phone call home. Back at camp, Shannan is angry with Blue for voting out Teresa but proud of Cameron for becoming Biggest Loser of the Week. He leads the team through a gruelling session holding a 100 kg rope, requiring them to keep their grip throughout the workout to rebuild their unity. Meanwhile, Michelle presents Red with plates of their favourite foods and has them burn off the calories contained in each meal. Ajay meets the contestants in the weigh-in room and announces that they will now compete as individuals. She reveals the season leaderboard, with Cameron at the bottom and Sean at the top. Ajay then introduces the Castaways, revealing that Nathan and Bob are still in the game and have been secretly training with The Commando. After their five weeks away, whichever of the two has lost the most weight will earn an automatic place as the fourth contestant in the finale. Back on Fitzroy Island, The Commando informs Nathan and Bob that the contestants at camp have now been told about their secret training.	1,249,000
52/09-4	Wednesday, 1 April	Makeover Special – The trainers arrive at camp and are shocked to see the contestants wearing black shirts, then even more surprised to learn about the Castaways. Michelle trains the women while Shannan works with the men. After training, the contestants learn that they will receive makeovers the following day with Joh Bailey. Following their hair and makeup appointments, they head to the Sydney Theatre to meet with a stylist. Their transformations are then revealed to Shannan and Michelle, with each contestant also receiving a surprise visit from a loved one. As the loved ones prepare to leave, Ajay arrives and announces that a huge surprise is coming that will affect everyone.	1,214,000
53/09-5	Thursday, 2 April	The Walk #9 – Meaghan – Surprise Elimination – Sharif – Michelle trains the men following their makeovers, while Shannan has the women write down their mental struggles before having them destroy the paper during training. On Fitzroy Island, The Commando puts the Castaways through a swimming challenge, with them pulling his boat to represent the weight they have lost. Shannan checks in with the contestants at camp about their carbohydrate intake. They then receive a letter instructing them to choose someone to take the Walk that week, warning that the chosen contestant will have “fundamental power over the game”. Meaghan is selected and meets Ajay, who reveals that one contestant will be eliminated by the end of the day. The discs offer her a choice: eliminate either a male or female contestant. Meaghan chooses the disc giving her the power to eliminate one male contestant—or herself. Given one hour to decide, the men head upstairs to pack their bags while the women weigh their options. Andrew shocks Meaghan by approaching her and admitting that he is ready to go home. Everyone is then summoned to the weigh-in room, where Meaghan reveals that she has chosen to eliminate Sharif. Two months later, Sharif has lost 66.1 kg and no longer feels embarrassed when out in public. He and his wife, Fleur, look forward to starting a family together.	1,145,000
54/09-6	Friday, 3 April	Challenge #10 – Hearts Racing – The trainers arrive at camp wondering where Sharif is before learning about the Walk and his elimination. Cameron breaks down, saying that Sharif really wanted to be there. Shannan takes the men through a session focused on mental strength. Michelle introduces the “Second Chance” couples, who have been continuing their weight-loss journeys on the outside. The couple who loses the most weight by the finale will win $10,000. She then asks the women to pack their suitcases for training, helping them feel empowered. At the challenge, contestants must pedal on spin bikes while maintaining a heart rate of at least 80% of their maximum. Anyone whose heart rate drops below that threshold or stops cycling is eliminated. The last contestant still pedalling will win immunity. Andrew is eliminated first, followed by Julie, Sean, Meaghan and Sammy.	906,000
Week 10
55/10-1	Sunday, 5 April	The Weigh-in #9 – With only Cameron and Tiffany remaining at the two-hour mark, Cameron’s foot slips out of the pedal, eliminating him and giving Tiffany the challenge victory and immunity. The trainers arrive to learn that Meaghan is sick and unable to participate in Last Chance Training. They also hear about Tiffany’s immunity and Cameron’s second-place finish. Meanwhile, eliminated contestants Holly and Mel return for a catch-up at the photoshoot. The trainers work with the contestants they originally selected on the first day. Andrew tells Michelle how vulnerable he feels because of the alliance in the house. On Fitzroy Island, The Commando puts the Castaways through a gruelling obstacle course ahead of their weigh-in. Both men improve on last week’s disappointing numbers. Back at camp, Cameron is named Biggest Loser of the Week for the second consecutive week, losing 3.77% of his body weight. Andrew and Sean fall below the yellow line and face elimination.	1,309,000
56/10-2	Monday, 6 April	Elimination #9 – Andrew – During deliberations, Meaghan reveals that she promised Andrew she would not vote for him. She begins to doubt herself, torn over her decision. Both Andrew and Sean feel vulnerable, but Andrew is ultimately voted out, with only Meaghan voting in his favour. Andrew leaves gracefully, grateful that Meaghan kept her word. Two months later, he has lost 45.6 kg and is fitter, stronger and more confident than ever.	1,160,000
57/10-3	Tuesday, 7 April	Off To New Zealand	1,184,000
58/10-4	Wednesday, 8 April	Face the Fears – Part 1 – Sammy, Sean and Cameron	1,078,000
59/10-5	Thursday, 9 April	Face the Fears – Part 2 – Tiffany, Meaghan and Julie	928,000
60/10-6	Friday, 10 April	The New Zealand Super Challenge	877,000
Week 11
61/11-1	Sunday, 12 April	Surprise Elimination – Meaghan / The Weigh-In #10	970,000
62/11-2	Monday, 13 April	Elimination #10 – Sean:	1,046,000
63/11-3	Tuesday, 14 April	Eliminated Contestants Return	1,119,000
64/11-4	Wednesday, 15 April	Temptation #8 – Table of Presents	1,133,000
65/11-5	Thursday, 16 April	Challenge #11 – Stacks on	1,182,000
66/11-6	Friday, 17 April	Wildcard Super Challenge – Escape from Cockatoo Island	1,014,000
Week 12
67/12-1	Sunday, 19 April	Wildcard Weigh-in #11	1,193,000
68/12-2	Monday, 20 April	Elimination #11 – Julie	1,122,000
69/12-3	Tuesday, 21 April	Train the Trainers	1,264,000
70/12-4	Wednesday, 22 April	Challenge #12 – The only way is up	1,295,000
71/12-5	Thursday, 23 April	The Walk #10 – Tiffany – Surprise Elimination – Stewart	1,226,000
72/12-6	Friday, 24 April	Bio-Age recalculations	1,084,000
Week 13
73/13-1	Sunday, 26 April	Final Weigh-in and Elimination #12 – Cameron	1,487,000
74/13-2	Monday, 27 April	The Castaways weigh in	1,538,000
75/13-3	Monday, 27 April	8:30pm- 2hr Grand Finale Night	1,798,000
75/13-3	Monday, 27 April	10:00pm- Winner Announced – Bob	2,097,000

=== Season 5: 2010 ===
Ep#/Wk-Ep#	Original airdate	Episode title / event	Total viewers (free-to-air rounded to nearest 1,000)
Week 1
1/01-1	Sunday, 31 January	Season Premiere: Welcome to Camp Biggest Loser/First Weigh-In; Shannon at 214.3kilos is the heaviest contestant. First challenge is a 4k run around the track. Joe and Rick win the race. David and Phil finish just behind them. Trainer Shannon pushes Shannon to make it 1 km. Shannon receives the nothing bracelet. Allan accepts the double bracelet. Caitlin sets a BL female record for weight loss in a week(15.2k). David and Phil are the biggest losers of the week David sets 2 BL records (highest WL% in a week and most WL in a week). Jeannie and Phoebe and Allan and Romi fall below the yellow line.	
Week 2
2/02-2	Monday, 1 February	Elimination: Aunt & Niece + Husband & Wife = Husband & Wife/Second Weigh-In; Allan and Romi are eliminated. Caitlin receives the double bracelet. At the challenge, for immunity, couples must dig up rowboats buried deep in the sand at Palm Beach, go to the other side of the beach and untie a pair of oars, row 500m to a pontoon and collect team flag. Finally both partners raced 200m and plant flag on finish line. Rick and Joe win immunity, Chris breaks an oar, the girls give up and Phil gets lost at sea. Contestants tell their story to a live audience of people who had previously applied to the biggest loser. At weigh-in everyone is safe for another week and Joe is the biggest loser of the week.	
Week 3
3/03-3	Tuesday, 2 February	Temptation: Secret Service; Daina wins temptation, a secret service of desserts varying in calories. Contestants rang a bell and the first to ring the bell ate the food. She consumed a whopping 4112 calories.	
4/03-4	Wednesday, 3 February	Family Reveal: Rick during training Caitlin reveals that she was suicidal. Later, as a reward for being biggest loser of the week, Rick receives a visit from girlfriend Melissa who reveals she is pregnant.	
5/03-5	Thursday, 4 February	Commando Challenge; Commando wakes up the contestants for a surprise midnight grueling 6 hour workout. Everyone worked together as one giant team. In the first task, everyone had to pull a tractor up an incline. Then, they had to move 25 tonnes of sand and rocks 5 meters using shovels and buckets. As a reward at the end they received letters from home.	
6/03-6	Friday, 5 February	Masterclass: Joe & Rick win challenge contestants received a crash course in how to lose weight/maintain weight loss. First the learned the 3 favorite stretches of Shannon and Michelle. Then they received a lesson on diet and nutrition from Dr. Swan. Next, they learned how to cook healthy meals using the Mediterranean diet with nutritionist Janelle. Sharif comes in to tell his story. The master class challenge is to pick exercises out of a hat and do them for 10minutes and see who has burned the most calories. Rick and Joe win burning 461 calories.	
Week 4
7/04-7	Sunday, 7 February	Weigh-In: Geoff leaves due to medical condition Geoff announces he is withdrawing from the biggest loser competition. Hayley then tells the contestants that the next eliminated couple can pick one person to remain at camp BL and become Wayne's partner. Phoebe/Jenni and Chris/Shannon fall below the yellow line. Wayne is the biggest loser of the week.	
8/04-8	Monday, 8 February	Elimination: Jenni + Phoebe = Jenni, Phoebe replaces Geoff as Wayne's partner the contestants train with a pro rugby team. Shannon challenges Chris to best Wayne this week	
9/04-9	Tuesday, 9 February	Challenge: Brains & Brawn	
10/04-10	Wednesday, 10 February	Family Reveal: Wayne	
11/04-11	Thursday, 11 February	Major Challenge: 10 km Marathon	
12/04-12	Friday, 12 February	Masterclass: Joe & Rick win challenge	
Week 5
13/05-13	Sunday, 14 February	Weigh-In: David & Phil and Elise & Teneale fall below the yellow line	
14/05-14	Monday, 15 February	Elimination: The Dads + Twin Sisters = Twin Sisters	
15/05-15	Tuesday, 16 February	Temptation: Mexican Standoff	
16/05-16	Wednesday, 17 February	Family Reveal: Wayne gave his family visit to Phil	
17/05-17	Thursday, 18 February	Major Challenge: Mini-Carnival	
18/05-18	Friday, 19 February	Masterclass: Caitlin & Daina win challenge	
Week 6
19/06-19	Sunday, 21 February	Weigh-In: Caitlin & Daina win	
20/06-20	Monday, 22 February	Elimination: All = Wayne; couples to singles	
21/06-21	Tuesday, 23 February	Challenge: Survival of the Fittest	
22/06-22	Wednesday, 24 February	Family Reveal: Phil gave his family visit to Joe	
23/06-23	Thursday, 25 February	Temptation: Everyone Has Their Price; Chris takes money	
24/06-24	Friday, 26 February	Masterclass: David, Rick & Phoebe win challenge	
Week 7
25/07-25	Sunday, 28 February	Weigh-In: Caitlin & Daina fall below the yellow line	
26/07-26	Monday, 1 March	Elimination: Caitlin + Daina = Daina	
27/07-27	Tuesday, 2 March	Temptation: Wheel of Temptation	
28/07-28	Wednesday, 3 March	Family Reveal: Phil gives his family visit to Lisa	
29/07-29	Thursday, 4 March	Challenge: Head to Head	
30/07-30	Friday, 5 March	Masterclass: Caitlin, Jarna & Phoebe win challenge	
Week 8
31/08-31	Sunday, 7 March	Weigh-In: Phoebe, Caitlin & Jarna fall below the yellow line	
32/08-32	Monday, 8 March	Elimination: Phoebe + Caitlin + Jarna = Jarna	
33/08-33	Tuesday, 9 March	Challenge: Balance and Concentration	
34/08-34	Wednesday, 10 March	Half-Marathon Challenge	
35/08-35	Thursday, 11 March	First Day in Northern Territory	
36/08-36	Friday, 12 March	Masterclass: Lisa & Rick win challenge	
Week 9
37/09-37	Sunday, 14 March	Weigh-In: Lisa & Caitlin fall below the yellow line	
38/09-38	Monday, 15 March	Elimination: Lisa + Caitlin = Caitlin	
39/09-39	Tuesday, 16 March	Total Body Makeovers	
40/09-40	Wednesday, 17 March	Family Visits after Makeovers	
41/09-41	Thursday, 18 March	Temptation: Food Heaven	
42/09-42	Friday, 19 March	Masterclass: No challenge	
Week 10
43/10-43	Sunday, 21 March	Weigh-In: Rick (gained weight, lost immunity) & Phoebe fall below yellow line	
44/10-43	Monday, 22 March	Elimination: Rick + Phoebe = Rick	
45/10-45	Tuesday, 23 March	Challenge: Abseiling	
46/10-46	Wednesday, 24 March	Challenge: Personal Challenge	
47/10-47	Thursday, 25 March	Challenge: Treasure Hunt	
48/10-48	Friday, 26 March	Masterclass: Skyjump Challenge, no winner	
Week 11
49/11-49	Sunday, 28 March	Weigh-In: No yellow line, everyone safe	
50/11-50	Monday, 29 March	David receives Shannan's nothing bracelet	
51/11-51	Tuesday, 30 March	Northern Territory Twist Revealed	
52/11-52	Wednesday, 31 March	Challenge: Flag Raising	
53/11-53	Thursday, 1 April	Challenge: Rochelle Gilmore's Spin Bike Challenge	
Week 12
54/12-54	Sunday, 4 April	Weigh-In: Lisa & Phoebe fall below the yellow line	
55/12-55	Monday, 5 April	Elimination: Lisa + Phoebe = Phoebe	
56/12-56	Tuesday, 6 April	Eliminated Contestants Return	
57/12-57	Wednesday, 7 April	Challenge: Eliminated Contestants Marathon, Phil & Joe's Marathon	
58/12-58	Thursday, 8 April	Challenge: Daina & Wayne win Marathon, back in competition	
59/12-59	Friday, 9 April	Masterclass: Shannan wins challenge	
Week 13
60/13-60	Sunday, 11 April	Weigh-In: Daina & David fall below the yellow line	
61/13-61	Monday, 12 April	Elimination: Daina + David = David	
62/13-62	Tuesday, 13 April	Challenge: Super Challenge	
63/13-63	Wednesday, 14 April	Dream Outfits	
64/13-64	Thursday, 15 April	Whitewater Rafting Team/Solo Challenge: Girls win team challenge, Daina wins solo challenge	
65/13-65	Friday, 16 April	Masterclass: Joe wins final challenge	
Week 14
66/14-66	Sunday, 18 April	Final Weigh-In & Elimination: Joe wins spot in final, Phil out & Daina + Lisa = Daina	
67/14-67	Sunday, 18 April	Grand Finale: Rick wins eliminated contestant prize	
68/14-68	Sunday, 18 April	Winner Announced: Lisa wins	

=== Season 6: 2011 ===
The sixth season, also known as The Biggest Loser Families, premiered on 30 January 2011 with 1.356 million viewers tuning in, making it the fourth-watched program that night.

No.	Original airdate	Episode title	Description	Total viewers (rounded to nearest 1,000)
Week 1
1	Sunday, 30 January	Season Premiere	Trainers lived and shared the same diet as their families for a week	1,356,000
2	Wednesday, 2 February	Public Weigh-In	All team members had to weigh in in front of family and friends at home	1,110,000
3	Thursday, 3 February	Trainer's Weigh-In; Contest #1: Endurance	For the first time in Biggest Loser history, the trainers had to weigh in. Contestants participated in three levels of 10 km on treadmills. Jarrod D won.	1,326,000
4	Friday, 4 February	Challenge #1: Train Pull	All four families had to pull two train carriages weighing 88 tons. Duncans won	1,004,000
Week 2
5	Sunday, 6 February	Weigh-In & Elimination #1	Greg C & Rebecca M were up. Greg C was eliminated after receiving 4 votes	1,080,000
6	Wednesday, 9 February	Temptation #1: $25,000 picnic	Leigh W won, however to receive it he would have to leave. He declined the $25,000	950,000
7	Thursday, 10 February	Family Weigh-In #1; Contest #2: Strength	The Duncans were the biggest-losing family to date with a loss of 43.8 kg. Contestants participated in 4 levels of curling weights. Challenors won	971,000
8	Friday, 11 February	Challenge #2: 6,000 Steps	Contestants completed 100 laps of ANZ Stadium staircases. Duncans won.	831,000
Week 3
9	Sunday, 13 February	Weigh-In & Elimination #2	Sarah D & Craig W were up. Sarah D was eliminated after receiving 4 votes	1,042,000
10	Wednesday, 16 February	Temptation #2: Chinese Banquet	Contestants had to indulge in a six-course meal of Yum Cha. Westrens won.	921,000
11	Thursday, 17 February	Family Weigh-In #2; Contest #3: Knowledge	The Westrens were the Biggest Losing family to date with a loss of 53.6 kg. Weights were added to teams who failed to answer correctly. Westrens won	961,000
12	Friday, 18 February	Challenge #3: Sandbags from home	Contestants completed rounds of sprinting, and filling sandbags. Duncans won	808,000
Week 4
13	Sunday, 20 February	Weigh-In & Elimination #3	Damien C & Jodie M were up. Damien C was eliminated after receiving 4 votes	994,000
14	Wednesday, 23 February	Secret Ballot	Contestants had the chance to vote for the team they wanted out of the game	947,000
15	Thursday, 24 February	Family Weigh-In #3; Contest #4: Super Contest	At the family weigh-in, the Chancellors narrowly lost to the combined team of Duncans, Westrens and Moon families. Damien lost no weight. The reward was a chance to pick who their champions would be at the Super Contest. The super contest reward was the ability to bring back an eliminated contestant. The super challenge consisted of three rounds: strength (holding a 1 kg dumbbell straight out over a paper line without breaking the tape), knowledge (answering a series of questions while an assistant ran on a treadmill that started at 5 mph and increased by 1 mph every wrong answer) and endurance (sprinting on a spin bike for 10 km). Joe won round 1, beating Leigh who lasted 34 minutes. Jarod won round 2 when Joe bailed out to save himself for round 3. The episode ended with Joe and Kelly neck-and-neck to win round 3.	967,000
16	Friday, 25 February	Challenge #4: Water Bottles against one	Joe won round 3 of the Super Challenge and brought Damien back into the house. The Moons have not been holding up their end of the workload, skipping morning training sessions sans the trainers. Sarah is not giving her best effort in training. Shannon works with Jodie to get her talking about her breast cancer journey and her mum's battle with cancer. Shannon discovers that Leigh is not being strict with his diet. Leigh eats two extra slices of bread and four scrambled eggs for dinner. Damien struggles with diet in his brief time at home. The challenge advantage is a 1 kg advantage/person at weigh-in. The challenge is to load and haul water bottles in a wagon across a 50 m distance. Miscommunication and infighting among the multi-family team is slowing down progress and the red team is also having minor spats as Damien is bugging Nathaniel.	789,000
Week 5
17	Sunday, 27 February	Weigh-In & Elimination #4	The Challenors won the water bottle challenge, gaining a 2 kg advantage at the weigh-in. The Challenors won the weigh-in and chose to eliminate Jarod.	1,076,000
18	Wednesday, 2 March	Temptation #3: Family Cholocate	Temptation this week involves eating chocolate buttons worth ten calories blindfolded over twenty minutes,. Winner gets immunity and a chance to go home for a night. The Challenors and Duncans abstain from playing. Leigh of the Westrens eats a single chocolate. Kellie wins the prize with 118 chocolates eaten for 1180 calories. Commando was livid that three of the Moons took temptation questioning self-discipline. As punishment the Moons are put through a grueling workout. By contrast, Shannon is over the moon by his team's performance, especially Sharlene. At the end of the episode it is revealed that Jarod gained 2.9 kg on the outside and indulged in bad food.	893,000
19	Thursday, 3 March	Family Weigh-In #4; Contest #5: Waterside Supercontest	Once again the Westrens were at the top of the leader board at the family weigh-in followed by the Duncans, Moons and the Challenors who were last. The Westrens picked Lara to represent them at the contest, Nathaniel to represent the Challenors at the contest, Rebecca for the Moons, and Emma for the Duncans. Before the contest Meg and Emma worked out their differences from high school where popular Meg had not treated Emma well. The contest consisted of three rounds: knowledge, strength and endurance. In round 1, the trainers sat in rowboats while the champions answered a series of questions. For every wrong answer the trainers had to fill their boat with 4 buckets of water until someone's boat sunk. Emma/Tifiny lost only correctly answering a single question. In round 2, the remaining challengers had to move 5 10 kg weights in a pool one at a time. Lara won easily and Nathaniel edged out Rebecca. In the final round champions had to hang off a rope without falling in the pool.	1,019,000
20	Friday, 4 March	Challenge #5: 4-way Tug of War	Lara outlasted Nathaniel on the rope and the Westrens got to assign a 1 kg penalty to a team at the next weigh-in, which was given to the Moons. The weekly challenge was a mega tug of war in a mud pit. Teams were harnessed to each other and had to crawl/claw their way and grab team flags. Every time a team won a round they had to unhook a team member from the harness. The winning family would get a 1 kg weight advantage at the weigh-in. The Challenors took round 1 and unhooked Nathaniel. Round 2 went to the Westrens who unhooked Craig. The Moons took round 3 and unhooked Rebecca. Round 4 was won by the Duncans who unhooked Emma. In round 5, the Challenors won and unhooked Joe. The Westrens took round 6 and unhooked Lara. The Moons won round 7 and unhooked Jodie.	—N/a
Week 6
21	Sunday, 6 March	Weigh-In & Elimination #5	Meg in a massive effort won the challenge giving the Duncans a much needed 1 kg advantage at the weigh-in. The Westrens and Moons fell below the yellow line. Craig and Jodie were nominated for elimination with Craig being eliminated in a close 3–2 vote	—N/a
22	Wednesday, 9 March	Loser Legends Return	past Biggest loser champs Bob (Westren family), Sam (Challenor Family), Lisa (Moon family) and Adro (Duncan family) returned to inspire and help the current biggest loser contestants	—N/a
23	Thursday, 10 March	Family Weigh-In #5; Contest #6: Loser Legends	At the family weigh-in, the Westrens were once again at the top of the leaderboard and the Moons were stuck at the bottom again. Commando is getting tired of the excuses. At the contest the loser legends got to compete in a three-round knockout competition. In the first round, contestants had to row 2 km. Sam won easily followed by Lisa and Adro who narrowly edged Bob. Adro almost lost when his foot came out of the foothold. In round 2, the champs had to choose assistants to answer questions. The champs were holding bowls which were filled with 5 kg bags of sand with every wrong answer. Lisa lost after 25 kg of sand were added to her bowl. In the final round, contestants had to lift a 20 kg bar as many times as possible	—N/a
24	Friday, 11 March	Challenge #6: Sand Dunes from hell	Sam outlasted Adro in the strength contest and got to reward immunity to one of his teammates (given to Nathaniel). After the contest, Michelle took Sam and Nathaniel to the beach for some bonding and to get Nathaniel out of his comfort zone. The challenge this week involved carrying buckets of water up a massive sand dune to a large container and filling it up until a key inside floated up allowing the team to open their flag. First place team had a 1 kg weight advantage at weigh-in and the team that came in last had a 1 kg penalty at weigh-in. The Challenors edged out the Westrens for the weight advantage and the Moons were fighting the Duncans to stay out of last place. Communication among the Challenors was much improved and they did not seem to getting on each other's nerves as much.	—N/a
Week 7
25	Sunday, 13 March	Weigh-In & Elimination #6	The Moons lost the challenge once again being hit with a 1 kg penalty at weigh-in. Lisa left the Moons with inspiration in her original weight picture and a motivational speech saying it took hard work and would not be handed to them on a silver platter. At weigh-in the Moon family is clearly falling apart. Hayley asks Jodie if she thinks the team is getting more focused and Jodie throws Sarah under the bus suggesting that she is not mentally/emotionally there even though Sarah has been putting up consistently good numbers. The Duncans and Moons fall below the yellow line. Emma and Jodie are put up for elimination. Emma is eliminated due to having a lower weight loss percentage.	—N/a
26	Wednesday, 16 March	Temptation #4: Freezers of temptation	Hayley announces a surprise elimination sometime this week. Temptation this week involves opening fridges with food and eating that food then opening the freezer to see if there is immunity. Meg and Nathaniel play. Meg wins but has to eat 1750calories (banana split and black Forrest cake). Nathaniel gets hit with a mere 300calories by contrast (ice cream cone and raspberry yogurt). Commando gets tough on the Moon family making them empty their rooms including beds except for hairbrushes	—N/a
27	Thursday, 17 March	Family Weigh-In #6; Contest #7: Log Supercontest	At the family weigh-in The Westrens top the leaderboard followed respectively by the Duncans, Challenors and the Moon family who continue to struggle. Craig has done the best of the eliminated contestants and Jarod has struggled most. The Westrens chose the champions of the contest. It was Kellie for the Moon family, Damien for the Challenors, Meg for the Duncans and Lara for the Westrens. Commando gives his team a lesson on basic nutrition. The contest involved sawing specific weights of logs from one large log. Round one was 1 kg piece. Meg took the first round. Also advancing to the next round were Damien and Lara. Round two the wood needed to be 2 kg within 50g. Damien won the second round. Also advancing was Lara. The final round the wood needed to be 4 kg +/- 200g.	—N/a
28	Friday, 18 March	Challenge #7: Assault Course	Jodie from the Moons was eliminated by the Westrens following this challenge. Damien won the contest. At training Sarah has a meltdown on the treadmill. The challenge is an obstacle course with the winning team eliminating a member of the losing team. Meg is exempt as she has immunity. Nathaniel and Joe represent the Challenors, Leigh and Lara represent the Westrens and Kellie and Rebecca represent the Moon family. The Challenors will have one minute taken off their time at the end of the challenge. It was a staggered start of five minutes between families Westrens then Challenors and finally the Moons. The race was run with each team tied together. The Moon family is a disaster physically and mentally. They took almost 12 minutes on the first obstacle and could not complete the second obstacle. The Westrens and Challenors were neck and neck for the win.	—N/a
Week 8
29	Sunday, 20 March	Weigh-In & Elimination #7	The Westrens won the challenge and eliminated Jodie. At weigh-in the Moon family and Challenor family fell below the yellow line. Nathaniel and Kellie were nominated for elimination with Nathaniel getting sent home.	—N/a
30	Wednesday, 23 March	Announcement of Singles; Pyramid of Fitness	Following the elimination of Nathaniel, the contestants were split into singles and then taken to a quarry to take part in the Pyramid of Fitness, which Leigh won. Lara is leading the competition in weight loss percentage at over 29%, Damien has lost the most weight overall at 60.5 kg and the three remaining members of the Moon family are dead last in weight loss, not surprising given how many times they have been below the yellow line. In round 1 of the pyramid of fitness, Commando led contestants through squats and they had to keep up with his count. Sarah was knocked out. In round 2 everyone had to do sumo deadlift high pulls, max reps in a minute. Who ever had the lowest reps in a minute was out (Sharlene 29 reps). Round 3 was a spin bike 2 km sprint last contestant out (Damien who did just 500m and was never on a spin bike before). The next round was holding 8 kg medicine balls above the head as long as possible. Kellie buckled first and was out. Round 6 was step-ups on a box max reps in a minute. Rebecca was out with 20 step-ups in a minute. Round 7 was on the cross trainers going as far as possible in 5 minutes. Meg and the Duncan family is out with 1.04 km. Round 8 was a 1 km rowing race. Last round was a treadmill race. first to bail out. Speed increased 2 km/hour every two minutes.	—N/a
31	Thursday, 24 March	Contest #8: Knowledge	Leigh won the ultimate athlete Temptation was a game of memory. A total of 48 boxes contained foods ranging from 50 to 750 calories, 2 boxes had immunity cards. Match two boxes with same food, choose another contestant to eat the food. No match have to eat 1 chocolate chip cookie (100C). Because Sarah was the only participant matches were kept open and non-matches wee closed. She had to eat 20 cookies or 2000 calories before gaining immunity. At the contest the prize was a 2 kg weight advantage at the next weigh-in, 1 kg for the winner and the other kg would be given to another contestant. A series of questions were asked and each correct answer bank 20 seconds of time. The contestants then had to do as many sit ups as possible in the allotted time. Damien was knocked out the first round with 32 sit-ups. In round 2, 10 questions were asked with correct answers banking 20 seconds. Champions then had to do as many shoulder presses as possible. Leigh was out with 52 reps. In the final round, Lara and Joe had to run as far as they could on a treadmill. Joe wins the contest and gives the extra kg to Rebecca	—N/a
32	Friday, 25 March	Challenge #8: Triathlon	The Westrens, Moons and Duncans go to play beach volleyball but Michelle holds the Challenors back as punishment for not giving Damien the kg advantage. Damien and Joe mend the relationship in training and Lara gets a boost from pro beach volleyball player. Nancy Potters. The challenge this week is a triathlon. First leg is a 200m x2 kayak paddle down river (top 6 move on). Second leg is 10 km bike race with top three moving on. Final leg is a 100m car race in the Honda Insight. Contestants had to build the road. The reward was spending time on board Cockatoo Island with family. Meg was leading after the kayak leg and Rebecca, Sharlene and Damien were out. Leigh crashed his bike and lost precious time fixing a broken chain. Leigh held Joe off to win the bike race. Joe put in a massive effort clawing his way from 6th to 2nd place. Meg, Sarah and Lydia were out this round.	—N/a
Week 9
33	Sunday, 27 March	Weigh-In & Elimination #8	Lara wins the challenge and gets to spend the night on cockatoo island with her mum Kathy. At weigh-in Damien and Lara fall below the yellow line. Damien misses being safe for another week by a mere 800g meaning Joe screwed him by giving Rebecca the advantage. She ends up fourth and without the advantage she would have ended up last and below the yellow line. Damien was eliminated in a close 4–3 vote.	—N/a
34	Wednesday, 30 March	Temptation #5: 24-hour Lockdown; Surprise Weigh-In	The contestants were locked in a room with fatty foods for 24 hours aiming to eat the most. Meg won immunity consuming 1490 calories. Following the temptation, there was a surprise weigh-in for another immunity. Joe won.	—N/a
35	Thursday, 31 March	Contest #9: Uphill Endurance e	Meg gained 4 kg at the surprise weigh-in and Joe lost an impressive 2.6 kg to win the second immunity. Commando works with Sarah on her confidence in training and Meg is pushed hard by Tiffiny to work off the 4 kg she gained. At the challenge, in round 1 champions had to run on a crosstrainer over 2 km at a resistance of 16. Lara won and Rebecca and Sharlene were eliminated. The second round was a 2 km race on a treadmill with an incline of 15. Leigh and Lara moved on and Sarah and Kellie were eliminated. Round three was to climb a sky wall as long as possible.	—N/a
36	Friday, 1 April	Challenge #9: Beach Flagpole Assault	Lara wins the 3rd immunity. At the challenge and final immunity opportunity, contestants had to collect the pieces for and build a flag at the beach by digging, swimming and crawling under logs.. It is neck and neck between Kellie and Leigh.	—N/a
Week 10
37	Sunday, 3 April	Weigh-In & Elimination #9	Leigh wins the final immunity by seconds. At weigh-in all four immunity holders lose weight to retain their immunity, with Meg's achievement of 3.4 kg being the most impressive. Sarah and Rebecca, who was eliminated, fall below the yellow line	—N/a
38	Wednesday, 6 April	Temptation #6: Ice Cream; Announcement of Makeover Week	Temptation this week was an ice cream truck. Joe and Leigh played with Joe winning by eating a chocolate dipped ice cream cone on top of the 2 sundaes both consumed. Leigh ate only the waffle cone plain. The contestants go rock climbing offsite. Meanwhile, Michelle pays Greg the first eliminated contestant a home visit after he reaches out to her for assistance. After looking in his fridge and seeing all the alcohol, cheese and sweets she offers to bring Greg back to camp for retraining for a week.	—N/a
39	Thursday, 7 April	Continuation of Makeover Week	Contestants, including Greg, get a makeover and walk the catwalk in front of Biggest Loser fans and loved ones.	—N/a
40	Friday, 8 April	Challenge #10: Jacob's Ladder from hell	the remaining contestants do the catwalk. Greg continues to struggle with his weight loss journey. At the challenge contestants climb Jacob's ladder	—N/a
Week 11
41	Sunday, 10 April	Weigh-In & Elimination #10	Joe wins the challenge after a grueling 3 hours and 24 minutes. Greg weighs in after his week of retraining and loses 8.4kilos. The remaining contestants give him placards with inspiring words written on them. At weighing Joe gives his extra kilo to Kellie. Meg and Lara fall below the yellow line. Lara is eliminated and Leigh is devastated.	—N/a
42	Wednesday, 13 April	Sailing from Sydney to Hobart #1	Contestants get reacquainted with their old selves via highlights from the trainers first week with the families in their own homes. Later Michelle and Shannon take the contestants to Sydney Harbor to learn to yacht from a sailor who was blinded in an accident. After Training Hayley is there to greet them and the contestants are sailing from Sydney to Hobart in an epic 4 day adventure. Sarah struggles with sea sickness.	—N/a
43	Thursday, 14 April	Sailing from Sydney to Hobart #2	the trek to Hobart continues. Sharlene receives a letter from Craig. The contestants and crew deal with the trials and tribulations brought on by the sea. Kellie talks to Michelle about her life. the Contestants receive letters from loved ones. At the end of the episode Sharlene injures her back falling on the deck in a nasty storm	—N/a
44	Friday, 15 April	Challenge #11: Tasmania Super Challenge	The contestants finish the trek to Hobart and Charlene is carried off the boat on a stretcher. In the super challenge contestants kayak from Constitution Dock to Sandy Bay Beach, then they climb 17 flights of stairs at the West Point Hotel and then they abseil 60 meters off the rooftop, then bike 4 km to Mount Wellington and run 4 km up the mountain and pick the dish with the lowest calorie count. Person with the highest calorie plate is eliminated. Sharlene will be left holding the last plate as she is ruled out of competing due to injury. Sarah and Kellie lead after the kayak race. Sarah continues to lead after the stair climb and abseil. Joe has jumped from last to 3rd after abseil. Leigh and Kellie are unable to overcome their fear of heights after encouragement from Commando for a half hour. Joe finishes first and picks 5 large strawberries (50 calories), Meg comes next and selects a can of tuna (100 calories), Sarah finishes 3rd and chooses a glass of orange juice (120 calories). Leigh finishes 4th and picks chicken nuggets (329 calories), Kellie finishes last and must choose between macadamia nuts and brie cheese	—N/a
Week 12
45	Sunday, 17 April	Weigh-In & Elimination #11	Kellie finishes last and picks double brie cheese, leaving Sharlene with a plate of macadamia nuts. The nuts at 704 calories was the highest meaning Sharlene was eliminated. Meg and Sarah fall below the yellow line. Meg is eliminated.	—N/a
46	Wednesday, 20 April	Return of Eliminated Players	Trainers return to the eliminated contestants homes to check up on them. The Moons have not been tossing out the junk food, Jarrod is struggling at home with exercise. The contestants have a sandwich making contest at Subway judged on taste, nutritional value, creativity and presentation. Sandwiches must not exceed 400 calories and 6 grams of fat. Prize is a $6000 fitness package. Sarah's sandwich wins. Nathaniel (35.56%) of the Challenors, Lara of the Westrens (34.55%), Rebecca of the Moons (27.86%) and Emma of the Duncans (37.12%) earn their way back to the white house.	—N/a
47	Thursday, 21 April	Challenge #12: Returning Players	the returning contestants get reacquainted with their families. Lara has a breakdown in her first workout back at camp. Returning contestants compete in basketball contest where contestants fill their racks with as many balls as they can in ten minutes. Whoever has the most balls after round 1 wins. Emma takes the first round with 14 balls in her rack. Rebecca takes round 2. Nathaniel breaks down just prior to the 3rd and final round.	
48	Sunday, 24 April	Returning contestants weigh-in	Nathaniel wins the third round eliminating Lara from the biggest loser. At the weigh-in Joe gains 100g and is stripped of his immunity. Nathaniel and Joe are up for elimination. The two go head to head in an elimination challenge. Round 1 they must hold medicine balls above their heads as long as possible (Joe buckles first.) In round 2 it is a 1 km rowing race.	—N/a
Week 13
49	Monday, 25 April	Yellow Line Challenge Ends; Check-up with Dr Swan; Contest #10: Super Contest	Nathaniel wins the yellow line challenge eliminating Joe. Contestants learn their new bio ages. Leigh has the best numbers 16 year difference (his chronological age is 23 and his new bio age is 18 and his aerobic fitness has improved 75%). Then contestants watch videos from their old selves recorded in week one. Round one of the contest involves flipping a large tire as many times as possible in a minute. Nathaniel and Leigh are safe from elimination recording 13 and 12 tire flips respectively. Round 2 involved moving 26 car tires from point A to B the quickest. Emma and Kellie finish in the top 2 and are safe from elimination. The final round is a tug of war between cousins Rebecca and Sarah.	—N/a
50	Wednesday, 27 April	Dream Outfits; Reflection Hike	Sarah defeats Rebecca in the tug of war contest eliminating Rebecca. Contestants try on their dream outfits. Contestants then go on the reflection hike and put the weight back on.	—N/a
51	Thursday, 28 April	Training the Trainers	It was train the trainers day. After smashing all four trainers, there was an ultimate trainer contest. In round one, a sack race, round 2 an egg and spoon race and round 3 spin around 30 and a 50 m dash. Michelle was eliminated round 1. Shannon was eliminated round 2. Commando won the last round. Contestants were then taken off site racing against off-road race cars who were racing 50k and the contestants were racing 5k for fairness. The contestants beat the car by a hair. Leigh conquers his fear of heights by skydiving.	—N/a
Week 13
52	Sunday, 1 May	Weigh-In & Elimination #13	the contestants are put through their paces by all 4 trainers at the last-chance workout. At the weigh-in, Nathaniel and Sarah fall below the yellow line and Nathaniel is eliminated in a 2–1 vote.	—N/a
53	Monday, 2 May	Live Finale	Emma wins the 2011 Biggest Loser title as the second female winner, Sharlene wins the $20,000 eliminated contest winner prize & The Westrens win the family weigh-in	—N/a

=== Season 7: 2012 ===
The seventh season also known as The Biggest Loser Singles aired on 23 January 2012.

No.	Original airdate	Episode title	Description	Total viewers (rounded to nearest 1,000)
Week 1
1	Monday, 23 January	Season Premiere	The 16 new contestants introduced their trainers to their diets for a day, and then left for Camp Biggest Loser. At Camp, they were faced with their first weigh-in, but surprised by being joined by family and friends.	
2	Tuesday, 24 January	Conclusion of First Weigh-In	All team members had to weigh in before family & friends, as well as their competitors at Camp.	
3	Wednesday, 25 January	Temptation #1: Wheel of Temptation	The contestants were faced with their first temptation for immunity. No-one took it.	
4	Thursday, 26 January	Challenge #1: Ferry Pull	All four teams had to pull an 18-ton ferry 500m.	
Week 2
5	Monday, 30 January	Conclusion of Challenge #1; Weigh-In And Elimination #1: Selena	The Black Team won the Challenge. After White and Blue fell below the Yellow Line, the other contestants were given the option to send no-one home, but only Alex and Graham took this option, sending Selena home.	
6	Tuesday, 31 January	Contest #1:Endurance; The Walk #1: Shane	The teams competed in their first Contest, which Shane won for the black team, allowing him The Walk. He picked "Mystery", which allowed Selena to return to Camp.	
7	Wednesday, 1 February	Temptation #2: The Vault	The contestants were faced with a temptation for $30,000 of the Winner's Prize Money. James took it, and was given the money in Gold bullion, handcuffed to his wrist until weigh-in, where he had to decide whether to take the money or stay at Camp with immunity.	
8	Thursday, 2 February	Challenge #2: Sheep Herding	The teams competed for a 2 kg advantage by herding sheep.	
Week 3
9	Monday, 6 February	Conclusion of Challenge #2; Tempted: James; Weigh-In And Elimination #2: Shane	In the Challenge, the Red Team beat the Black Team in the Final, giving them the 2 kg advantage. James decided to take the money and leave the competition. After White and Black fell below the Yellow Line, the other contestants sent Shane home.	
10	Tuesday, 7 February	Reveal of The Bunker; Public Speaking Challenge	Hayley revealed to the trainers the existence of The Bunker, a secret room where they could spy on their contestants. The Contestants were challenged to give a short speech to others who were struggling to lose weight about their struggles.	
11	Wednesday, 8 February	Temptation #3: 12-Hour Lockdown	The contestants were faced with a 12-hour temptation, with lots of high-calorie food on offer. The Blue Team dominated the temptation, and won Team Immunity.	
12	Thursday, 9 February	Challenge #3: Valley Stampede	The teams competed to not have a 2 kg disadvantage at the Weigh-in, on a punishing obstacle course. In the end, it came down to the Black and Blue teams.	
Week 4
13	Monday, 13 February	Conclusion of Challenge #3; Weigh-In And Elimination #3: Brenda	In the challenge, the Black Team marginally beat the Blue Team, giving them the 2 kg disadvantage. The Red and Black Teams fell below the Yellow Line. In an emotional vote, Brenda was eliminated when against Alex.	
14	Tuesday, 14 February	'Beginning of Boys vs Girls week Contest #2: Super Contest; The Walk #2: Lydia	As part of Boys vs Girls week, the Contest was run in two teams. The Girls won, and sent Lydia on the Walk, where she picked Food and forced the Boys to only each Orange Food for the Week.	
15	Wednesday, 15 February	Temptation #4: Silver Spoon	The contestants were faced with a fine dining temptation, with a five-star menu being on offer, as well as Immunity and a night away with a contestant of their choice. In an effort to spend the night with Michelle, Hamish beat off his rivals and won immunity.	
16	Thursday, 16 February	Challenge #4: Hell Hill	The teams raced up a sand dune to do fifty laps as a team, for a 2 kg weight advantage.	
17	Friday, 17 February	Behind The Scenes #1; Makeover: Brenda	—N/a	
Week 5
18	Monday, 20 February	Conclusion of Challenge #4; Weigh-In And Elimination #4: Ryan	At the challenge, The girls won. The Boys lost the weigh-in, and nominated Graham and Ryan to face the vote, where Ryan was unanimously sent home.	
19	Tuesday, 21 February	Beginning of Immunity Week; Contest #3: Strength	Before the Contest, Hayley announced that the week would have three immunities on offer, each with an extra prize – a 24-hour leave pass from camp. In this contest, contestants raced to move one ton of bricks 30m. After a close race between Luke and Margie, it was Luke who won. After Luke left for his 24 hours away, the Contestants were surprised with an upcoming twist.	
20	Wednesday, 22 February	Surprise Weigh-in; Beginning of Temptation #5: Chocolates	In the shock weigh-in, Lydia lost the most weight and took the second immunity and leave pass. The final immunity and leave pass was offered to the person who ate the most chocolates in 10 minutes.	
21	Thursday, 23 February	Conclusion of Temptation; Challenge #5: Sand and Sea	In the Temptation, Hamish cruised to another victory. The teams raced to not have a 1 kg disadvantage per team member, digging out paddles and a kayak and transferring them from one beach to another.	
22	Friday, 24 February	Behind The Scenes #2; Makeover: Ryan	—N/a	
Week 6
23	Monday, 27 February	Conclusion of Challenge #4; Expulsion: Luke; Weigh-In And Elimination #5: Bek	In the Challenge, The White Team lost, giving them a 4 kg disadvantage. After the Challenge, the contestants had a party, but Luke smuggled alcohol into Camp, and became abusive to the others. He was expelled from Camp. The White and Black teams lost the weigh-in, and nominated Bek and Graham respectively to face the vote, where Bek was unanimously sent home.	
24	Tuesday, 28 February	Early Morning Training Session; Race Back to Camp; Contest #4: Endurance	To regain control of Camp, the trainers organised a surprise training session before sunrise. Hayley then surprised everyone by announcing that they would be racing back to camp, and the first team back would win the power to banish another team until weigh-in. Red won and sent White to the bush. The other three teams then faced a contest, where one person had to balance on a narrow perch for as long as possible. After Hamish fell, just Margie and Simon were left.	
25	Wednesday, 29 February	Conclusion of The Contest #4; The Walk #3: Margie; Temptation #6: Aussie BBQ	After they were forced to stand on one leg, Simon fell into the water, leaving Margie as the winner. On the Walk, she selected Mystery, which allowed her to exclude someone's weight from their team's total at the Weigh-In. At Temptation, the Contestants were faced with six barbecues, with temptation and a $2000 multimedia package. Simon was the only one to play.	
26	Thursday, 1 March	Conclusion of Temptation #6; Challenge #6: Quarry Run	At temptation, Simon won, eating only a burger, after the Red and Black teams conspired to not let Hamish win. At the Challenge, one person from each of the three teams was selected to break rocks and transport them up a hill to fill their rivals' baskets. The winning team won a phone call home, and the right to exclude one trainer from Last Chance Training. The Black team won, and selected Shannan to be excluded, but gave everyone a phone call home.	
27	Friday, 2 March	Behind The Scenes #3; Makeover: Bek	—N/a	
Week 7
28	Monday, 5 March	Phone Calls Home; Weigh-In And Elimination #6: Hamish	The Contestants still at Camp received their phone calls home. At the Weigh-In, Margie excluded Simon's weight from his team's loss, but it was not enough to save the Black Team, who fell below with Hamish. As he had a higher weight loss percentage than Hamish, Graham volunteered to go up. At the vote, Hamish received three votes, which was enough to send him home as the person with a lower percentage loss.	
29	Tuesday, 6 March	Conclusion of Elimination; Beginning of Old Dogs vs Young Pups Week; Contest #5: Super Contest	The fallout of Selena's elimination vote for Hamish was felt through the White Team. As he had no-one left to train, Shannan also left Camp. Hayley then announced that they would be competing in two teams again – young vs old. To balance out the teams, Margie was required to switch for the week. At the Contest, the Old Dogs dominated, sending Simon on the Walk.	
30	Wednesday, 7 March	The Walk #4: Simon; The Secret; Temptation #7: Charm School	Simon was selected by his team to go on The Walk, where the Mystery box was replaced by The Secret. When this was selected, Simon had to select one person to know The Secret, also known as The Bunker, and he picked Lydia. At Temptation, the Contestants themselves were the Temptation, competing for a meal out in their team, and immunity as an individual for the most charming.	
31	Thursday, 8 March	Conclusion of Temptation #7; Challenge #7: Generation Balance	By a score of 13–11, the Young Pups won the meal out, and Michelle was the most charming individual, so she won immunity. In the challenge, the contestants had to cross a narrow balance beam, carrying items from their decade of birth.	
32	Friday, 9 March	Behind The Scenes #4; Makeover: Hamish	—N/a	
Week 8
33	Monday, 12 March	Conclusion of Challenge #7; Weigh-In And Elimination #7: Selena	Due to Margie throwing the Challenge, the Old Dogs won, and got to select someone (Selena) to weigh-in right there and then. At the Weigh-In, The Old Dogs won the Week, and sent the Young Pups to elimination. However, for the first time, the losing team voted within themselves who should go. Selena wanted to go home, so her wish was granted.	
34	Tuesday, 13 March	Beginning of Singles; Contest #6: Endurance	Hayley called the Contestants back to the weigh-in room for an announcement – they were to become singles. She also announced that Lydia was the current Biggest Loser. At the Contest, the contestants were faced with their old selves from Week 1. They ran a 400m race and then had to do the same, coming as close to their original time as possible, whilst carrying their Day 1 weight. By one second, Lisa edged out Michelle to win the power of the Walk.	
35	Wednesday, 14 March	The Walk #5: Lisa; Carcoar Training Session; Temptation #8: Sushi Train	Lisa went on her first walk, picking the Mystery box. This allowed her the power to select two people who had to be tied together until weigh-in. She selected Graham and Alex. Graham was taken back home by the Commando for a training session. Upon Graham's return, Alex refused to be tied to him, and as a result got a 2 kg disadvantage and lost his right to compete for immunity this week. In the Temptation, Graham and Margie were left searching for the immunity under one of the plates.	
36	Thursday, 15 March	Conclusion of Temptation #8; Challenge #8: Ultimate Athlete	Margie edged Graham out by finding the immunity plate to win it. In the challenge, the contestants were faced with travelling a marathon in four stages – bike, cross trainer, rowing machine and treadmill, with two people being eliminated in each round. In the end, it came down to Margie and Lydia in the last 5 km sprint.	
37	Friday, 16 March	Behind The Scenes #5; Makeover: Selena	—N/a	
Week 9
38	Monday, 19 March	Conclusion of Challenge #8; Weigh-In And Elimination #8: Simon	In the end, Lydia edged out Margie to win a 1 kg advantage, a phone call home and the title of Ultimate Athlete 2012. At the weigh-in, a poor number by Margie was saved by her being immune, so it was Lisa and Simon who were below the Yellow Line. They both wanted the other to stay and to go home themselves, but in the end, Simon's wish was granted and he was eliminated.	
39	Tuesday, 20 March	Heights Training Session; Contest #7: Endurance; The Walk #6: Lisa	To show exercise could be fun, Michelle and Tiffiny split their six contestants (including Alex) into two groups, who went rock climbing and learnt the art of trapeze respectively. Whilst this was going on, Graham was being trained by Commando in order to harness the anger shown at the weigh-in. At the Contest, Michelle as Biggest Loser of the previous week got to sit three people out, and she chose Alex, Lydia and Margie. The remaining four then competed to duck and dive over spinning bars, which got progressively faster. In the two heats, Kasey beat Michelle and Lisa beat Graham to make the final, which was easily won by Lisa. On her second walk, she again picked the Mystery Box.	
40	Wednesday, 21 March	Conclusion of The Walk #6; Temptation #9: Patisserie	Lisa went on her second walk, and her mystery power was revealed to be the opportunity to pick one person to get exclusive use of their trainer until weigh-in. She picked herself, leaving Lydia and Margie to train with Tiffiny and Commando. In the Temptation, four people played – Alex, Margie, Lydia and Michelle, but it was Michelle who won the immunities.	
41	Thursday, 22 March	Conclusion of Temptation #9; Challenge #9: Tyre Stack	Michelle assigned her second immunity to Kasey. Margie won the 1 kg advantage from the challenge.	
42	Friday, 23 March	Behind The Scenes #6; Makeover: Simon	—N/a	
Week 10
43	Sunday, 25 March	Conclusion of Challenge #9; Weigh-In And Elimination #9: Lisa	The challenge finished, with Lisa getting the 1 kg disadvantage. At the weigh-in, Lisa and Alex fell below the yellow line, and Graham and the White Team banded together to eliminate Lisa.	
44	Monday, 26 March	Eliminated Contestants Return; Beginning of Makeovers	Shannan returns to surprise the Eliminated Contestants and announce that they will be taking part in a week-long boot camp to get back in the competition. The remaining contestants, as well as James and Luke, get a make-over.	
45	Tuesday, 27 March	Conclusion of Makeovers	The made-over contestants take part in a runway show.	
46	Wednesday, 28 March	Trainers' Night Out; Challenge #10: Raft Challenge	At the end of the Makeover, the Trainers take the contestants for a night out. The next day, Shannan takes his secret team into a hard core training session with a special guest.	
47	Thursday, 29 March	Behind The Scenes #7; Makeover: Shane	—N/a	
Week 11
48	Sunday, 1 April	Conclusion of Challenge #10; Weigh-In And Elimination #10: Lydia	The challenge finishes, with the final two players being on bedroom lockdown, with only each other and a spin bike for company.	
49	Monday, 2 April	Reveal of the Bunker; Return of Eliminated Contestants to Camp; Contest #8: Strength	The final five learn of the existence of the Bunker, and are plagued by the appearance of white-hooded intruders. The eliminated contestants compete for the first weigh-in passes, which Lisa and Simon won.	
50	Tuesday, 3 April	Contest #9: Knowledge	The eliminated contestants compete for the third weigh-in pass, which Lydia won.	
51	Wednesday, 4 April	Challenge #11: Iron Man	The final two weigh-in passes were on offer in a Biggest Loser Iron Man, the first of which went to Brenda.	
Week 12
52	Sunday, 8 April	Conclusion of Challenge #11; Weigh-In And Return of Lydia, Brenda and Bek	The challenge finishes, with Bek claiming the final pass. She, Lisa and Simon fell below the yellow line and she was voted back into the game, along with Lydia and Brenda.	
53	Monday, 9 April	Contest #10: Endurance	The final eight compete in a poolside contest with the power to send someone home until the weigh-in, which Margie won, and sent Michelle home.	
54	Tuesday, 10 April	Temptation #10: Temptation Booth	The contestants are faced with a 24-hour temptation taking place in a booth in the living room for immunity, which Alex won.	
55	Wednesday, 11 April	Challenge #12: Stacks On	The contestants are given the opportunity to stack weight onto each other to win a 1 kg advantage and the power to assign a 1 kg penalty.	
Week 13
56	Sunday, 15 April	Conclusion of Challenge #12; Weigh-In And Elimination #11: Michelle	The challenge finishes, with Lydia winning and assigning the 1 kg to Graham. Margie and Michelle were below the yellow line and Michelle was sent home in a hung vote.	
57	Monday, 16 April	Trainers Fulfil Dreams	The remaining contestants fulfil lifelong dreams with their trainers, including horse riding, surfing and riding motorcycles.	
58	Tuesday, 17 April	Temptation #11: Cupcakes	The contestants are faced with a floor of cupcakes, three of which hold immunity.	
59	Wednesday, 18 April	Challenge #13: Manly Treasure Hunt	Two contestants are put to the test to see how much they have really learnt, as they teach a pump class to some gym patrons. Later the contestants take on a challenge in the open water at Manly.	
60	Thursday, 19 April	Behind The Scenes #8; Makeover: Michelle	—N/a	
Week 14
61	Sunday, 22 April	Weigh-In And Elimination #12: Lydia	In last chance training, an ambulance is put on hold for one of the contestants and another is told it is bed rest until results for a knee injury are in. At weigh-in, we reveal some shocking results. At the weigh-in, Graham & Lydia fell below the yellow line, and Lydia was sent home permanently.	
62	Monday, 23 April	Beginning of Face Your Fears Week: Switzerland	The final six and the trainers travel to Switzerland to begin Face Your Fears week. Bek, Brenda & Kasey skydived at 5,000 ft. from a helicopter, Alex and Margie had an 80m freefall with a 120m canyon swing, and Graham had a 190m abseil.	
63	Tuesday, 24 April	Reflection Hike	The contestants reflect on where they were 14 weeks ago, by putting the weight back on in a 4 km hike through snow.	
64	Wednesday, 25 April	Challenge #14: Switzerland Super Challenge; Elimination #13: Graham	The contestants face a Super Challenge, the loser of which will be eliminated. Graham was eliminated as he was holding the 525 calorie chocolate.	
65	Thursday, 26 April	Behind The Scenes #9; Makeover: Lydia	—N/a	
Week 15
66	Sunday, 29 April	Conclusion of Super Challenge; Weigh-In And Elimination #14: Bek	The contestants return from Switzerland to find a most welcome homecoming present for them. Less welcomed is the weigh-in and inevitable elimination where they learn of another twist – that the final four would be a final three.	
67	Monday, 30 April	Train the Trainers	It is the training session that the contestants enjoy more than any other – train the trainer. It is the perfect way to demonstrate the techniques and methods that they have learnt over the months.	
68	Tuesday, 1 May	Bio Age Update; Cocktail Party	Expect some startling results as the contestants are told their current bio age. Meanwhile, there is a chance to be single and mingle at the cocktail party.	
69	Wednesday, 2 May	Guest Champions; Challenge #15: With Strings Attached	A good time was had by all at the party and confidence levels are high. What better time to embark on a very special training session with four special guest champions.	
70	Thursday, 3 May	Behind The Scenes #10	—N/a	
Week 16
71	Sunday, 6 May	Final Weigh-In And Elimination #15: No-one	At final weigh-in, two contestants fall below the yellow line. With heavy hearts, the two voting contestants write down a name. But before they have the chance to reveal it, they are given a proposal. Kasey and Margie were both saved from elimination when Alex and Brenda took the offer of sending no-one home.	
72	Tuesday, 8 May	Live Finale	The final four, as well as the eliminated contestants, weigh in for the final time to determine who wins the $220,000 prize and the eliminated contestants' prize of $20,000 respectively. Margie was the biggest loser, with a percentage of 46.64%, and Lydia won the eliminated contestants' prize with a loss of 44.47%.	

=== Season 8: 2013 ===
The eighth season also known as The Biggest Loser: The Next Generation aired on 17 March 2013.

Ep#/Wk-Ep#	Original airdate	Episode title / event	Description	Total viewers (free-to-air rounded to nearest 1,000)
Week 1
1	Sunday, 17 March	Season Premiere	The 14 new contestants in the shape of 7 couples made up of parents and their kids, either mother & son, father & son, mother & daughter and father & daughter. The couples first make a promise in front of 3,000 strangers and then have to jump off a cliff. Hayley welcomes everyone to the new biggest loser house and announces that a couple will win the biggest loser.	
2	Monday, 18 March	First Weigh-In	All team members had to weigh in for the first time and the teams start their first training session.	
3	Tuesday, 19 March	Major Challenge #1 – Man vs Machine	Hayley offered all the contestants immunity if they can lose 100 kg as a group at the weigh-in. The contestants were faced with their first challenge, pulling their combined weight in a skip as a group 100m to the finish while racing a fighter jet plane to win a 7 kg advantage, they won.	
Week 2
4	Sunday, 24 March	Weigh-in #1	The contestants weighed in for the first time and beat heir 100 kg goal and no one was eliminated. Hayley then brought in two new teams (dubbed the heavyweights) which includes the heaviest contestant worldwide.	
5	Monday, 25 March	The Fridge #1	Hayley introduced a new twist called the fridge which could bring an advantage/disadvantage to a team. Anita & Cher received it and got Shannon excessively for a week.	
6	Tuesday, 26 March	Major Challenge #2 – Half Marathon	The couples were split into 3 teams and each team had to do a half marathon with each couple doing at least one 3 km lap. Michelle's team of the red, sky blue and pink teams won and got a 1 kg advantage on the scales. .	
Week 3
7	Sunday, 31 March	Weigh-in #2 / Elimination #1	The contestants weighed in for the second time and though of their 1 kg advantages, Sam & Jess and Richard & Amber were put up for elimination but only one person of the safe couple was allowed to vote. Sam &Jess were eliminated by a 4–2 vote, Hayley told everyone that an eliminated couple will return to the game in the near future. .	
8	Monday, 1 April	The Fridge #2	Janet & Kirsten were given the fridge this week and got a 24-hour visitors pass with an isit from their loved ones. An off-site training session saw Brett break his left arm. .	
9	Tuesday, 2 April	Major Challenge #3 – Flushed away	Each couples had to hold one arm in the air to hold a trough full of water to tip over them, the last team standing would win immunity, the pink team won.	
Week 4 (Supersized Week)
