= The Biggest Loser Australia season 7 =

The Biggest Loser Australia
- Season 7
- Starring: Michelle Bridges; Shannan Ponton; Steve Willis (The Commando); Tiffiny Hall
- No. of episodes: 72

Release
- Original network: Network Ten
- Original release: 23 January – 8 May 2012

Season chronology
- Next → Season 8

The seventh season of the Australian version of the original NBC reality television series The Biggest Loser, known as The Biggest Loser Australia: Singles, premiered on 23 January 2012 on Network Ten. All four trainers from the previous season (Michelle Bridges, Shannan Ponton, Steve Willis (The Commando) and Tiffiny Hall) returned with Hayley Lewis also returning as host. The season featured contestants competing as teams of four, as with the previous season, but split by age and gender, with Shannan training the under 30 males, The Commando the over 30 males, Tiffiny the under 30 females and Michelle the over 30 females. Season 6 was won by Margie Cummins.

The season was announced during the Season 6 finale on 2 May 2011 and was confirmed at the Network TEN 2012 Program Launch on 17 August 2011, originally announced as a second "Families" installment, until rebranded as "Singles" with an emphasis on 'romance'.

Production and filming on the season began on 14 November 2011.

== Host and personalities ==
Host: Hayley Lewis has returned for her third season as host.

Trainers: Shannan Ponton, Michelle Bridges, Steve Willis ("The Commando") and Tiffiny Hall all trained in the 2011 season have returned in this year (2012)

== Game variations ==
- Singles: All contestants this season are single, and feel their weight has held them back from a love life.
- Team Division: The contestants are divided into four teams of four by age and gender, with Shannan training the under 30 males, The Commando the over 30 males, Tiffiny the under 30 females and Michelle the over 30 females.
- Schedule: For the first three weeks, the show retains its four night a week schedule, but the nights changed to Monday, Tuesday, Wednesday and Thursday. However, from the fourth week onwards, a Friday night show was added, consisting of unseen footage and catch-ups with the latest eliminated contestant. From Week 10, the schedule shifts forward by one day, so the week begins being shown on a Sunday instead of a Monday.
- The Walk: The Walk returns from its two-year break, and the power of the walk becomes the prize for winning the Contest.

=== Schedule ===
==== Weeks 1–3 ====
- Monday: Conclusion of Major Challenge, Weigh In and Elimination
- Tuesday: The Contest and the Walk
- Wednesday: Conclusion of The Walk and Temptation
- Thursday: Conclusion of Temptation and Beginning of Major Challenge

==== Weeks 4–9 ====
- Monday: Conclusion of Major Challenge, Weigh In and Elimination
- Tuesday: The Contest and the Walk
- Wednesday: Conclusion of The Walk and Temptation
- Thursday: Conclusion of Temptation and Beginning of Major Challenge
- Friday: Behind the scenes

==== Weeks 10–15 ====
- Sunday: Weigh-in
- Monday: The Contest and the Walk
- Tuesday: Conclusion of The Walk and Temptation
- Wednesday: Conclusion of Temptation and Beginning of Major Challenge
- Thursday: Behind the scenes

=== Teams ===
Contestant	Week															
Contestant	1	2	3	4	5	6	7	8	9	10	11	12	13	14	15	Finale
Margie	Red Team			Girls	Red Team		Young Pups	Black Player								The Biggest Loser
Alex	Black Team			Boys	Black Team		Old Dogs	Black Player								Runner Up
Kasey	White Team			Girls	White Team		Young Pups	Black Player								3rd Place
Brenda	Red Team									Eliminated Contestant		Black Player				4th Place
Bek	White Team			Girls	White Team					Eliminated Contestant		Black Player				Eliminated Contestant
Graham	Black Team			Boys	Black Team		Old Dogs	Black Player								Eliminated Contestant
Lydia	Red Team			Girls	Red Team		Old Dogs	Black Player			Eliminated Contestant	Black Player				Biggest Loser Among Eliminated Contestants
Michelle	White Team			Girls	White Team		Young Pups	Black Player								Eliminated Contestant
Lisa	Red Team			Girls	Red Team		Old Dogs	Black Player		Eliminated Contestant						Eliminated Contestant
Simon	Black Team			Boys	Black Team		Old Dogs	Black Player		Eliminated Contestant						Eliminated Contestant
Selena	White Team		White Team	Girls	White Team		Young Pups			Eliminated Contestant						Eliminated Contestant
Hamish	Blue Team			Boys	Blue Team					Eliminated Contestant						Eliminated Contestant
Luke	Blue Team			Boys	Blue Team											Eliminated Contestant
Ryan	Blue Team			Boys						Eliminated Contestant						Eliminated Contestant
Shane	Black Team									Eliminated Contestant						Eliminated Contestant
James	Blue Team															Eliminated Contestant

== Contestants ==
There is slated to be four teams of four, totaling up to 16 contestants.

Contestants	Original team	First Singles Color	Second Singles Color	Third Singles Color	Fourth Singles Color	Status	Votes When Eliminated
Selena; Returned via Weigh In	White Team					Eliminated Week 1	5
James; Under 30 Males	Blue Team					Walked Week 1	Left by temptation
Shane; Over 30 Males	Black Team					Eliminated Week 2	4
Brenda; Returned via Weigh In	Red Team					Eliminated Week 3	4
Ryan; Under 30 Males	Blue Team					Eliminated Week 4	4
Bek; Returned via Weigh In	White Team					Eliminated Week 5	2
Luke; Under 30 Males	Blue Team					Expelled Week 5	Left by expulsion
Hamish; Under 30 Males	Blue Team					Eliminated Week 6	3
Selena; Under 30 Females	White Team					Eliminated Week 1 Re-Eliminated Week 7	5
Simon; Over 30 Males	Black Team	Black Player				Eliminated Week 8	3
Lisa; Over 30 Females	Red Team	Black Player				Eliminated Week 9	3
Michelle; Under 30 Females	White Team	Black Player	Black Player	Black Player	Black Player	Eliminated Week 12	3
Lydia; Over 30 Females	Red Team	Black Player	Black Player		Black Player	Eliminated Week 10; Re-Eliminated Week 13	5
Graham; Over 30 Males	Black Team	Black Player	Black Player	Black Player	Black Player	Eliminated Week 14	Left by challenge
Bek; Under 30 Females	White Team				Black Player	Eliminated Week 5 Re-Eliminated Week 14	2
Brenda; Over 30 Females	Red Team				Black Player	4th Place	4
Kasey; Under 30 Females	White Team	Black Player	Black Player	Black Player	Black Player	3rd Place	0
Alex; Over 30 Males	Black Team	Black Player	Black Player	Black Player	Black Player	Runner Up	0
Margie; Over 30 Females	Red Team	Black Player	Black Player	Black Player	Black Player	The Biggest Loser	0

=== Weigh-ins ===
Contestant	Age	Height	Starting BMI	Current BMI	Starting weight	Week															Finale	Weight lost	Percentage lost
Contestant	Age	Height	Starting BMI	Current BMI	Starting weight	1	2	3	4	5	6	7	8	9	10	11	12	13	14	15	Finale	Weight lost	Percentage lost
Margie	34	175	52.0	28.0	159.1	150.7	145.6	141.7	136.3	129.7	126.8	121.8	121.0	115.2	111.4	110.3	108.3	107.2	102.6	98.0	85.9	73.2	46.01%
Alex	50	162	61.6	34.1	161.6	150.9	146.0	143.2	139.2	131.6	129.3	123.3	118.3	115.8	115.2	111.1	111.0	107.6	102.1	96.6	89.4	72.2	44.68%
Kasey	26	171	45.4	26.9	132.8	125.9	122.6	118.4	115.9	111.4	106.5	104.2	100.1	97.7	97.0	94.6	91.8	90.6	87.6	83.2	78.8	54.0	40.66%
Brenda	40	172	40.8	25.9	120.8	113.1	110.4	108.3							97.7	90.9	88.4	86.9	83.8	78.5	76.5	44.3	36.67%
Bek	26	172	42.7	26.7	126.3	121.0	117.7	114.4	111.0	107.1					97.2	92.3	88.9	87.3	84.6		79.0	47.3	37.45%
Graham	36	194	55.6	36.1	209.3	198.0	193.2	188.8	184.7	177.9	173.0	166.9	163.2	157.1	155.9	152.2	145.6	145.0	LEFT		135.9	73.4	35.07%
Lydia	34	165	52.1	28.9	141.9	131.6	127.2	124.1	122.3	115.7	111.7	106.6	103.3	100.2	100.6	95.5	92.3	93.2			78.8	63.1	44.47%
Michelle	24	168	39.1	23.9	110.4	102.4	100.4	97.5	93.8	91.3	86.4	85.8	80.5	80.2	81.1	77.7	77.0				67.4	43.0	38.95%
Lisa	42	170	36.1	24.2	104.2	98.2	96.1	94.3	91.1	86.7	84.8	83.1	81.3	79.8	82.9	80.1					69.9	34.3	32.92%
Simon	40	161	63.4	42.6	164.3	154.4	151.2	147.3	143.9	136.5	135.3	128.9	127.2		127.9	122.9					110.3	54.0	32.87%
Selena	21	170	56.6	43.3	163.5	158.7	156.5	149.5	145.4	138.5	135.8	131.9			131.2						125.1	38.4	23.49%
Hamish	21	173	49.7	33.4	148.7	143.8	140.8	136.7	132.8	127.0	124.0				116.3						100.0	48.7	32.75%
Luke	26	180	44.8	34.3	145.2	137.3	133.2	129.0	126.8	LEFT											111.1	34.1	23.48%
Ryan	29	192	65.4	50.5	241.0	228.4	221.5	214.2	206.1						196.8						186.2	54.8	22.74%
Shane	38	187	47.1	37.0	164.8	154.7	151.3								141.7						129.5	35.3	21.42%
James	22	189	38.2	26.1	136.3	126.4	LEFT														93.2	43.1	31.62%

Contestants

- Below the Yellow Line
- Below the Yellow Line and Week's Biggest Loser
- The week's biggest loser
- The contestant returned to the competition
- Had immunity for the week
- LEFT – The contestant left the competition before a weigh-in (by choice or challenge or expulsion)
- Gained weight and below the yellow line
- Had immunity but lost it due to gaining weight, and below the yellow line
- Had immunity and the week's biggest loser
- Gained weight at the Surprise Immunity Weigh-In
- Won Immunity at the surprise Immunity Weigh-In
- Weigh-in for previously eliminated contestants
- Last Person Eliminated before finale
- Winner (among finalists)
- Winner (among eliminated)

BMIs

- Healthy Body Mass Index (less than 25.0 BMI)
- Overweight Body Mass Index (25.0 – 29.9 BMI)
- Obese Class I (30.0 – 34.9 BMI)
- Obese Class II Index (35.0 – 39.9 BMI)
- Obese Class III (40.0 or above)

Notes

- In week 7, Selena weighed in 48 hours prior the other contestants after her team lost a challenge. Her result was 3.9 kg.
- In week 12, Graham had a 1 kilo disadvantage so his weight loss of 6.6 kilos was reduced to 5.6 kilos.
- In week 12, Lydia had a 1 kilo advantage so her weight loss of 3.2 kilos was increased to 4.2 kilos.

=== Leaderboard ===
Contestant	Age	Height	Starting BMI	Starting Weight	Current BMI	Current Weight	Kg	Percent
Margie	34	175	52.0	159.1	28.0	85.9	73.2	46.01%
Alex	50	162	61.6	161.6	34.1	89.4	72.2	44.68%
Kasey	26	171	45.4	132.8	26.9	78.8	54.0	40.66%
Brenda	40	172	40.8	120.8	25.9	76.5	44.3	36.67%

=== Weight loss history ===
Contestant	Week 1	Week 2	Week 3	Week 4	Week 5	Week 6	Week 7	Week 8	Week 9	Week 10	Week 11	Week 12	Week 13	Week 14	Week 15	Finale
Margie	−8.4	−5.1	−3.8	−5.4	−6.6	−2.9	−5.0	−0.8	−5.8	−3.8	−1.1	−2.0	−2.1	−4.6	−4.6	−13.1
Alex	−10.7	−4.9	−2.8	−4.0	−7.6	−2.3	−6.0	−5.0	−2.5	−0.6	−4.1	−0.1	−3.4	−5.5	−5.5	−7.2
Kasey	−6.9	−3.3	−4.2	−2.5	−4.5	−4.9	−2.3	−4.1	−2.4	−0.7	−2.4	−2.8	−1.2	−3.0	−4.2	−4.4
Brenda	−7.7	−2.7	−2.1	-10.6							−6.8	−2.5	−1.5	−3.1	−5.3	−2.0
Bek	−5.3	−3.3	−3.3	−3.4	−3.9	-9.9					−4.9	−3.4	−1.6	−2.6	-5.7	
Graham	−11.3	−4.8	−4.4	−4.1	−6.8	−4.9	−6.1	−3.7	−6.1	−1.2	−3.7	−6.6	−0.6	-9.1		
Lydia	−10.3	−4.4	−3.1	−1.8	−6.6	−4.0	−5.1	−3.3	−3.1	+0.4	−5.1	−3.2	+0.9	-14.4		
Michelle	−8.0	−2.0	−2.9	−3.7	−2.5	−4.9	−0.6	−5.3	−0.3	+0.9	−3.4	−0.7	-9.6			
Lisa	−6.0	−2.2	−1.7	−3.2	−4.4	−1.9	−1.7	−1.8	−1.5	+3.1	−2.8	-10.2				
Simon	−9.9	−3.2	−3.9	−3.4	−7.4	−1.2	−6.4	−1.7	+0.7		−5.0	-12.6				
Selena	−4.8	−2.2	−7.0	−4.1	−6.9	−2.7	−3.9	-0.7			-6.1					
Hamish	−4.9	−3.3	−3.8	−3.9	−5.8	−3.0	-7.7				-16.3					
Luke	−7.9	−4.1	−4.2	−2.2	-17.6					+1.9						
Ryan	−12.6	−6.9	−7.3	−8.1	-9.3						-10.6					
Shane	−10.1	−3.4	-9.6								-16.2					
James	−9.9	-23.8								-9.4						

=== Percentage loss history ===
Contestant	Week 1	Week 2	Week 3	Week 4	Week 5	Week 6	Week 7	Week 8	Week 9	Week 10	Week 11	Week 12	Week 13	Week 14	Week 15	Finale
Margie	−5.28%	−3.38%	−2.68%	−3.81%	−4.84%	−2.24%	−3.94%	−0.66%	−4.79%	−3.30%	−0.99%	−1.81%	−1.94%	−4.29%	−4.48%	
Alex	−6.62%	−3.25%	−1.92%	−2.79%	−5.46%	−1.75%	−4.64%	−4.06%	−2.11%	−0.52%	−3.56%	−0.09%	−3.06%	−5.11%	−5.39%	
Kasey	−5.20%	−2.62%	−3.43%	−2.11%	−3.88%	−4.40%	−2.16%	−3.93%	−2.40%	−0.72%	−2.47%	−2.96%	−1.31%	−3.31%	−5.02%	
Brenda	−6.37%	−2.39%	−1.90%	-9.79%							−6.96%	−2.75%	−1.70%	−3.57%	−6.32%	
Bek	−4.20%	−2.73%	−2.80%	−2.97%	−3.51%	-9.24%					−5.04%	−3.68%	−1.80%	−3.09%		
Graham	−5.40%	−2.42%	−2.28%	−2.17%	−3.60%	−2.75%	−3.53%	−2.22%	−3.74%	−0.76%	−2.37%	−4.34%	−0.41%			
Lydia	−7.26%	−3.34%	−2.44%	−1.45%	−5.40%	−3.46%	−4.57%	−3.10%	−3.00%	+0.40%	−4.78%	−3.35%	+0.98%			
Michelle	−7.25%	−1.95%	−2.89%	−3.79%	−2.67%	−5.37%	−0.69%	−6.18%	−0.37%	+1.12%	−4.19%	−0.90%				
Lisa	−5.76%	−2.24%	−1.77%	−3.39%	−4.83%	−2.19%	−2.00%	−2.17%	−1.85%	+3.88%	−3.38%					
Simon	−6.03%	−2.07%	−2.58%	−2.31%	−5.14%	−0.88%	−4.73%	−1.32%	+0.55%		−3.91%					
Selena	−2.94%	−1.40%	−4.47%	−2.74%	−4.75%	−1.95%	−2.87%	-0.53%								
Hamish	−3.30%	−2.29%	−2.70%	−2.85%	−4.37%	−2.36%	-6.62%									
Luke	−5.44%	−2.99%	−3.15%	−1.71%	-13.88%											
Ryan	−5.23%	−3.02%	−3.30%	−3.78%	-4.51%											
Shane	−6.13%	−2.20%	-6.35%													
James	−7.26%	-18.83%														

=== Major Challenges ===
- Week 1 – Ferry Pull – In the first challenge, the teams were required to pull an 18-ton ferry 500m down a river using a row boat, at which point they had to unhook the ferry, turn round and row their way back to the start line. The first team to cross the finish line would get a 2 kg advantage at the first weigh-in. Due to injury, Alex could not take part, so was replaced by the Commando. As a result, the other three teams were also given the opportunity to replace one of their team members with their trainer. The winners were the Black team, followed by Red, Blue and White.
- Week 2 – Sheep herding – The teams went head-to-head in pairs to pen seven sheep each – young vs old. The winners of each heat went head-to-head in the final round. The winner of the final round won a 2 kg advantage at the weigh-in. As the white team were three members, Ryan, Brenda and Alex from the Blue, Red and Black teams were required to sit out to give the challenge an even playing field. In the first heat, the red team whitewashed the white team, by a score of 6–0 by the twenty-minute time limit. Following two instances of runaway sheep in the second heat, the black team defeated the blue team by a score of 3–1, leaving the over-30s teams to battle for the advantage. In the final, the red team defeated the black team to win the advantage by a score of 7–3.
- Week 3 – Valley Stampede – In a change from the previous challenges, There was no prize for coming first – it was all about not coming last. Two people from each team had to take part in a 2 km obstacle course, filled with mud. Whichever team came last got a 2 kg weight disadvantage at the weigh-in. Hamish and Luke, Lisa and Lydia, Simon and Graham and Bek and Kasey respectively were the pairs taking part. For the second time in two weeks, the red team won the challenge, closely followed by the white team. Both Hamish and Graham struggled for their teams, but in the end, it was the black team who finished first.
- Week 4 – Hell Hill – As part of Boys vs Girls week, the contestants competed in two teams. They had to climb 60m up a steep hill of sand as a team fifty times in a relay and collect a flag. Each person had to race at least once. The first team to fifty laps won a 2 kg advantage at the weigh-in. After an initially close race, the girls' team were the winners by four laps, taking the 2 kg advantage and a second win in a row against the boys.
- Week 5 – Sand and Sea – The teams were faced with a challenge similar to Week 3's – there was no prize for the winners – it was all about not coming last. The four teams had to assign "diggers" and "paddlers", digging up kayaks and paddles which were buried in the sand. They then had to transport the kayaks and paddles 200m across the beach to the other side, where they had to paddle out to buoys which had the weight they had lost over the past four weeks attached to them. The team that came back to the start with the kayaks, paddles and weight lost last received a kilogram penalty for each team member, meaning that the blues faced a 2 kg, the blacks and reds 3 kg and the white team a 4 kg penalty. As both blue team members had received immunity through the contest and temptation respectively, they were already safe at the forthcoming weigh-in. After Hamish uncovered a paddle, the black and white team members began uncovering a paddle and kayak respectively. However, the white team struggled with their communication, with Bek yelling at Selena whilst she was digging, highlighting a rift. The red team then finally began uncovering their kayak, and were the first team to completely get their kayak out of the sand after 75 minutes of digging. The rift between Selena and the rest of the white team deepened, to the point that Selena walked off just to be away from the team, leading to her being comforted by Hayley. The red team then became the first team to get their kayak and paddle to the other side of the beach, with the black team doing the same and being two minutes behind them. The red team quickly obtained their weights, and became the first team to finish with a time of around 2 hours, 15 minutes, followed closely by the black team. As Luke had a fractured metatarsal, he was ruled out of carrying the boat across the beach, leaving it to Hamish, which gave him a revelation. After three and a half hours, the blue team finished, giving the white team a 4 kg disadvantage.
- Week 6 – Quarry Run – As the white team were banished, they did not compete in this challenge. The teams were taken to a quarry where each team were given a pile of rocks. The teams were required to break the rocks down into smaller pieces using a sledgehammer, in order to put it into their two buckets and carry them up a steep hill. At the top of the hill, there were three baskets, one for each competing team. The aim was to fill a team's basket using the rocks. When the rocks reached the marked yellow line, the respective team is out and the last team standing wins. One person from each team competed in the challenge. As Hamish was the only member of the Blue Team, he ended up representing Blue. The Red Team had to choose who would compete for the Black Team and in turn, the Black Team had to choose who would compete for the Red Team, ending up in Graham competing for Black and Lisa for Red. At first, both the Red and Black Teams targeted Hamish, while his focus was on the Red basket. Throughout the challenge, tension started to build between Red and Black as Simon initially nominated Lisa in the beginning, targeting her lack of muscular strength, annoying Margie in the process. Hamish was the first to be out of the challenge, and the Red and Black teams now started to focus on each other's baskets. Red fell behind as Lisa dropped a bucket into a basket letting Graham get ahead and ultimately leading to the Black Team's first challenge win since Week 1, and the Red Team's first loss since Week 1.
- Week 7 – Generation Balance – As part of the Old Dogs vs Young Pups week, the contestants competed as two teams. They were taken to an aquatic centre, above which were two narrow, wobbly balance beams. One at a time, team members had to cross their beam to a table, which had twenty items on it – ten from before 1982 and ten from after 1982. The first team to return their items to the start point won a huge advantage – the choice of which member of the opposing team would weigh-in then and there, and not get a last chance workout. After leading for the first six items, Margie's sabotage of the White Team allowed the Old Dogs to take the lead and win the challenge.
- Week 8 – 42 km ultimate athlete – The contestants had to complete a 42 km marathon over a series of elimination rounds. The winner would get a trophy, ikg advantage at weigh in and a phone call home. Round 1 was a 21 km race on spin bikes, Kasey and Alex were eliminated. Round 2 was a 10 km race on cross trainers, Simon and Graham came last and with Michelle afterwards collapsed of exhaustion. Then as Hayley was talking to the contestants, Simon collapsed again and was taken for medical treatment. The next round was a 6 km rowing race, Lisa and Michelle were eliminated. The final round was between Margie and Lydia in a 5 km race on the treadmills with Lydia ending up as champion winning the trophy, 1 kg advantage and call home.
- Week 9 – A 'Tyre'some challenge – The contestants were taken to a junk yard for the challenge. Contestants had to place 10 tyres onto a pole then off again and do the same to four more poles. Once at the end, they had to do the same on the return trip back to the start. The winner would get a 1 kg advantage at the weigh in and the person who comes last a 1 kg penalty at the weigh in. Margie easily won and the advantage but Lisa clearly struggled and came last getting the penalty.
- Week 10 – River Raft – For this week's challenge, the contestants were put into pairs by random. Michelle and Alex, Margie and Graham and Lydia and Kasey. They had to build a raft out of materials provided with rope and paddle down a river to the finish. The winning team got a 1 kg advantage on the scale while the losing team would be on room lockdown until weigh in with only a spin bike to occupy them. Michelle and Alex got a good head start and won the challenge while Lydia and Kasey not fairing to well with their strategy failing and nearly falling in many times, they lost and went on lockdown.
- Week 11 – 1 km Iron Man Super Challenge – As part of the eliminated contestants' return, the remaining five eliminated contestants without a weigh-in pass – Bek, Brenda, Hamish, Ryan and Shane – competed in their final challenge – a Biggest Loser Iron Man. For the first part, they had to swim against the current in a 150m swim parallel to the beach. They then had to run 100m up a sand dune, and answer three multiple choice nutrition questions correctly. If they answered a question incorrectly, they had to run to the bottom of the sand dune and then climb back up and re-answer the question. Once all three were answered correctly, they had to run 350m down the sand dune to another beach. At the final beach, they found paddleboards, and had to paddle the final 400m to a boat where the final two passes awaited. After dominating the swim leg, Bek fell behind at the multiple choice questions, allowing Brenda to surge ahead and claim the fourth weigh-in pass. The final weigh-in pass came down to a paddleboard sprint between Bek and Shane. In the end, Bek got the last weigh in pass.
- Week 12 – Stacks On – This challenge was used back in Season 4. As Michelle was at home and Alex in hospital, only 6 were playing. The challenge was simple, each contestant held a 20 kg Olympic bar; one at a time, a contestant will choose one contestant to a hold 10 kg weight. If they drop the bar, they are out. Last one standing wins. The winner receives a 1 kg advantage and power to give a 1 kg penalty to another contestant. After the first round, everyone had 10 kg. Then the eliminated contestants, Bek, Brenda and Lydia were being targeted. After round 2, Brenda was first out and with least amount on, Kasey was out after Round 3. In Round 4, Graham was being targeted but due to a previous injury, Margie stepped down. In round 5, Graham was once again targeted and after 70 kg was out. In the end, after 50 kg, Bek stepped down, giving Lydia the win and 1 kg advantage.
- Week 13 – Manly Treasure Search – The final seven (minus Alex and Lydia, due to injury) were taken out onto Sydney Harbour on a boat, where they were required to swim to the shore, dig up a treasure chest and then race back to Camp, where they had to find the correct key to unlock their chest. The first person to unlock their chest won a 1 kg advantage. Margie was the first back to camp, and she won. All the chests contained packages from home, which everyone (including Alex and Lydia) received.
- Week 14 – Switzerland Super Challenge – Contestants had to first trek 1 km through the slopes to traditional sleds and sled to the bottom then run through the forest to the bikes where they had to bike 6 km over rough terrain to the interlacken bridge. There, they had to rappel from the bridge to the river where they had to kayak 500m down the river and a final sprint to the center of interlacken. There, 6 traditional Swiss food & drinks were presented and they had to choose the one they think had the lowest calories. Margie was in front at the start but lost her snow show on a slope and had to wait to get it back as Kasey, Bek and Brenda surged ahead. However, they started to struggle on the stage and Margie passed them into first followed by Bek, Kasey, Brenda with Graham in fifth. Alex struggled including falling off his bike heavily many times and was in last. Margie arrived first and chose raspberries. Bek was next but couldn't decide then Kasey arrived and as Kasey was going to take the hot chocolate, Bek took it and Kasey went for the sausage. Brenda was next followed by Graham. Graham chose the chocolate leaving Alex with the last plate. In the end, it was between Graham and Alex. It was the chocolate which had the highest calories and was eliminated.
- Week 15 – With strings attached – Contestants arrived at the location of where they did the valley stampede challenge in week 3. Contestants were told they had to do it while attached to their trainer by a string.

=== The Contest ===
- Week 1 – None: There was no walk or contest in the first week
- Week 2 – Endurance: The teams each picked one champion for the Contest – Shane, Lydia, Luke and Michelle respectively. The contest would be a three-round elimination endurance test. In the first round, champions were required to hold a 3 kg medicine ball above their heads – once one person dropped, the others moved on. After six minutes, this was Lydia. For the second round, the champions held plates with eggs on at arm's length above pieces of tape – like in the first round, the first to drop (Michelle) was out. In the final round, Shane and Luke were required to hold two telephone directories using only the palms of their hands for as long as possible. After 22 minutes, Luke dropped his, leaving Shane as the first Contest winner.
- Week 3 – None: Due to the public speaking mini-challenge, there was no walk or contest in the third week.
- Week 4 – Super Contest: As part of Boys vs Girls week, the contestants competed as two teams, and chose a champion for each of the three disciplines – Strength, Speed and Endurance. The first team to win two rounds won the power of the Walk. In the first round, Strength, Ryan and Margie had to hold a 20 kg bar on their shoulders whilst their chosen question answerers, Hamish and Lydia, answered nutrition-related questions. For each incorrect answer, 5 kg was added to their bars. The first to drop lost the round. After 40 kg was on his bar, Ryan decided to give up, handing the first round to the girls. For the second round, Luke and Michelle competed to race 10 km on a spin bike. In a close race, it was Michelle who came out on top, winning the Contest and the power of the Walk for the girls.
- Week 5 – Strength: This week the contest was held outside the arena. Hayley told the contestants that this was immunity week with not just immunity but a 24hr trip outside camp and there was 3 immunities up for grabs. The contestants were playing as individuals but still as teams at weigh in, they had to transport 1 tonne of bricks from one pallet to another 30 meters away. Throughout it was close between Margie and Luke but Luke won and got immunity and went home for 24hrs.
- Week 6 – Endurance: The contest this week took place on the beach. The white team did not take part as they were banished to the bush for a week by the red team in the mini challenge. The contest was for one member of each team to stand on a pole in the water which was getting increasingly narrower in width. Hamish was the first to drop, after over two hours. After three and a half hours, Simon & Margie were required to stand on one leg. After some negotiations of a possible alliance between red and black so that Margie could get rid of Hamish, Simon fell first, giving Margie the power of the Walk.
- Week 7 – Super Contest: As part of Old Dogs vs Young Pups week, the contestants competed in their two teams in a three-round contest. For the first round, Lisa and Kasey fought in a round of knowledge, ordering ten foods from highest to lowest calories. After a few attempts, Lisa beat out Kasey to hand the first round to the Old Dogs. In the second round, Lydia and Michelle fought in a sit-up contest, with the quickest person to 100 sit ups winning the round. By around 90 seconds, this was Lydia. As the Old Dogs won the first two rounds, there was no need to take part in the final round – a game of skill.
- Week 8 – Endurance: This contest took part outside the arena. This is the first contest this series as individual players and no teams. In this contest, the contestants first ran a 400m track. Then the twist came in with them putting the weight they lost so far and running the track again to reach their original time with the 4 closest going into the final round. In the final round was Michelle, Lisa, Graham and Simon with Lisa coming closest and winning the contest.
- Week 9 – Endurance: This contest was in the arena. The contest was a cylindrical column with two arms, one at the top and one at the bottom. The champions have to duck and jump over the bars as it spins round but starts to gain speed making it harder, the first to hit the bar is out. Michelle as biggest loser of the week had to choose 3 people to go against. She chose Lisa, Kasey and Graham. Kasey beat Michelle then Lisa beat Graham. In the final round, Lisa beat Kasey winning Lisa her second contest in a row.
- Week 10 – None: There was no contest this week due to makeover week.
- Week 11: Part 1 – Strength: As part of the return of the Eliminated Contestants, the first two weigh-in passes were on offer. In the first round of this contest, the contestants had to hold a 1.2 kg weight in front of them above a piece of tape, without lowering or bending their arms, changing their grip or breaking the tape. The first four to drop were out of this contest. After Brenda, Hamish, Ryan and Shane dropped their weights, that left Bek, Lisa, Lydia, and Simon to go through to the second round. For the second round, the four remaining eliminated contestants were challenged to travel 10 km on the spin bikes, with the first two finishers being guaranteed a spot at the weigh-in at the end of the week. With times of 12 minutes 20 seconds and 12 minutes 32 seconds, Simon and Lisa respectively secured their weigh-in passes.
- Week 11: Part 2 – Knowledge: For the remaining 6 eliminated contestants without passes, another weigh-in pass was on offer in the second contest of the week. They had to get on a treadmill starting at 4 km/h, they will answer true or false questions about food and nutrition, if they got it right, then they would stay at the same speed but if they got the question wrong then the speed would go up by 1 km/h every time. The last one standing wins the pass. After a few wrong answers, Ryan was quickly out followed by Hamish, Brenda and Bek leaving just Shane and Lydia. In the end, Lydia won the third pass.
- Week 12 – Strength: This contest took place at the pool in camp. Kasey was not there due to a doctors' appointment. The champions were the top four on the biggest loser leader board; Alex, Margie, Lydia and Michelle. The prize was to send one contestant home until weigh in. The contest was in each round, two contestants move medicine balls of different weights from one end to the other while being attached to bungee ropes making it harder to move. Round 1 was Lydia v Michelle with Lydia narrowly winning. Round 2 was Alex v Margie, with Margie winning the round. The final round was Lydia and Margie Standing on a slanted platform over each end of the pool holding onto a rope, the last one standing wins. After a previous injury, Lydia struggled leading to Margie winning the contest. Even though she wanted to see her family, she gave the power to Michelle as it was her Mother's birthday this week.
- Week 13 – None: There was no contest this week due to dream week tasks.
- Week 14 – None: There was no contest this week due to face your fears week in Switzerland.
- Week 15 – None: There was no contest this week due to train the trainers day.

=== The Walk ===
The Walk returns as the prize for winning the weekly Contest, after a two-year break giving "one contestant the ability to totally spin the game on its head."

- Week 1 – None: There was no walk or contest in the first week
- Week 2 – Shane: For winning the contest, Shane was given the opportunity to take the first walk. Faced with the choice of three boxes, each labelled "Food", "Mystery" or "Training", he picked "Mystery" revealing that an eliminated contestant will be brought back. As it was only Week 2, the only choice for this was Selena.
- Week 3 – None: Due to the public speaking mini-challenge, there was no walk or contest in the third week.
- Week 4 – Lydia: This week, teams were combined into two, boys and girls. For winning the contest, the girls decided to give Lydia the opportunity to take the walk. Faced with the choice of three boxes, Food, Training or Mystery, Lydia picked Food. It was revealed that Lydia had the option to choose a team to eat green or orange food for the week. Lydia decided to make the boys' team eating only orange food for the entire week.
- Week 5 – None: There was no walk as it was immunity week, the walk was not up for grabs in the contest.
- Week 6 – Margie: After Margie won the Endurance contest, she was given the same three options as in the previous two walks – Food, Training and Mystery. She picked Mystery, and revealed that it contained a card telling her to exclude one person's weight from their team's weigh-in total. As Hamish was a one-man team, he was excluded from this which got Margie frustrated as wanted Hamish to get the power. She was not required to give a decision until the weigh-in.
- Week 7 – Simon: After the Old Dogs won the Contest, they nominated Simon to take the walk. He had the choice of Food, Training or a new option – The Secret. He picked The Secret, which allowed him and his team to nominate one person to find out The Secret. After a battle of Rock, Paper, Scissors, this was Lydia, and she was taken by Hayley to The Bunker, where she became the only contestant to know about it.
- Week 8 – Lisa: She was faced with the usual food, training and mystery boxes. She chose mystery, giving her the power to have 2 contestants strapped to each other until weigh in. She chose Alex and Graham. Graham didn't know this as he was taken by the commando. Alex refused to strap himself to Graham so Hayley told him that he will receive a 2 kg disadvantage at the weigh in.
- Week 9 – Lisa: Lisa picked the Mystery box again, which gave her the chance to pick one person to have sole access to their trainer until weigh-in. She picked herself and Michelle to be her trainer, so Lydia & Margie were forced to train with Commando & Tiffiny.
- Week 10 – None: There was no walk this week due to makeover week.
- Week 11 – None: There was no walk as the contests were playing for weigh in passes for the eliminated contestants.
- Week 12 – None: There was no walk as the power was to send someone home for the week.
- Week 13 – None: There was no walk as there was no contest due to dream week tasks.
- Week 14 – None: There was no walk as there was no contest due to face your fears week in Switzerland.
- Week 15 – None: There was no walk as there was no contest due to train the trainers day

=== Temptations ===
- Week 1 – Wheel of Temptation: The first temptation was a Wheel of Fortune-style wheel with 26 sections, each with either a number or the word "Immunity" on it. If a contestant spun and landed on one of the immunities, they would be the one to win immunity. If they landed on a number, they would have to eat a food with that number of calories. After increasing the number of immunity spaces a number of times, eventually to 13, and reducing the calorie spaces to a maximum of 350, no-one took the temptation, so no-one won immunity.
- Week 2 – The Vault: Each person was left in a room dubbed "Food Heaven" – containing tempting foods from their past – for five minutes. The person who ate the most calories – with items ranging from 50 cal. upwards – won the temptation and $30,000 in gold bullion. Only two people played – Lisa ate a 70 cal. Freddo bar. However, that was not enough to beat James, who decided to take two colas, a 500 cal. cheese platter and some chocolate, totalling 960 calories. However, the money forms a part of the winner's prize fund and in order to take the money, he must leave the competition forever. If he does not take the money, his prize becomes immunity.
- Week 3 – 12-Hour Lockdown: Each team was locked in their bedrooms for twelve hours, with their rooms being stocked with a great deal of their personal vices, including meat pies, sausage rolls and drinks. The team which consumed the highest amount of calories in twelve hours won the biggest prize in the Biggest Loser – team immunity. For the first time ever, the trainers got an insight into their teams using the means of The Bunker, which was introduced in the previous day's episode. After the twelve hours were up, the teams met to discover who had won. Neither the Black, White or Red teams decided to consume anything in the twelve hours, which left the Blue Team, who consumed a total of 2,745 calories, as the winners of team immunity.
- Week 4 – Silver Spoon: This week, even though there was 2 teams, everyone was playing for themselves. Playing for Immunity and a nights stay with a contestant of their choice in a luxury cottage. Similar to temptations from other series, this time, the lounge was turned into a fine dining restaurant. In each round, 2 players will step up and will be served five star food made a famous chef. When Hayley rings a bell, the players have one minute to grab a silver spoon placed in the middle of the table if they wish. If they grab the spoon then they must eat the food and would stay at the table. If no one played then they would be eliminated and the next two would step up. After Lydia started off in the winners' seat, no-one decided to eat, keeping her there until Hamish was selected. Hamish chose to eat, and defeated three people by eating each meal put in front of him. The penultimate round was between Hamish and Ryan, and both men intended to play. However, Ryan was beaten to the spoon by Hamish, who won the round and, as neither he or Michelle ate, won the immunity and night away from camp, which he took Michelle on.
- Week 5 – Chocolates: All the remaining contestants without immunity sat down at a table with boxes of chocolates at each chair. The game was the person to eat the most chocolates would win the final immunity and the final 24hr leave pass but they were blindfolded for the entire duration. Throughout the game, many players, played with wrappers to tease them to eat but it was Hamish who was the only one who ate and won the final immunity and the 24hr leave pass.
- Week 6 – Aussie BBQ: The contestants were faced with six barbecues – four containing traditional Australian food, ranging from 150 cal. to 1000 cal. Under one was a $2000 new Microsoft package consisting of a laptop and a mobile phone. Under the final one was immunity. On Hayley's mark, the contestants raced to claim a barbecue – if it contained food, it must be eaten. If no-one played, Hamish kept it as the last holder of immunity. Simon was the only one to play and select a barbecue. The first one he picked was an Australian Burger which contained 566 calories. He continued to play, and the next one he picked was the one that contained immunity, taking it from Hamish.
- Week 7 – Charm School: In this temptation, the contestants were the temptation themselves, and had to charm 24 strangers into selecting them as most charismatic. The team with the most votes were taken out for a five-star meal, and the individual who received the most votes won immunity. By a score of 13–11, the Young Pups won, and Michelle was the most charismatic, so she won immunity. At the meal, she was also surprised by a visit from Hamish.
- Week 8 – Sushi Train: For refusing to be chained to Graham, Alex was not allowed to compete for immunity. Today's temptation was similar to one from season 2. The train will start and reveal 25 plates of food ranging from 50 to 600 calories. Under 4 of them were prizes worth up to $5,000 and the last one is immunity. They had to pick up a plate and eat the dish before turning over to see if there was a prize below. If no one played then immunity would go to Michelle. In round 1, Margie, Lydia, Simon and Graham played with Simon winning a laptop. In round 2, Simon won a home gym. It was a fight between Margie and Graham for immunity. In the end, Margie won immunity.
- Week 9 – Patisserie: The contestants were faced with a sweet temptation – a room full of desserts. Even sweeter was the prize – two immunities – one for the winner, and one for the person who they selected. Four people – Alex, Margie, Lydia and Michelle played, with Lydia and Michelle dominating. However, it was Michelle's pick of an 850 calorie chocolate dessert which won her the two immunities. She gave the other immunity to Kasey leaving the former white team girls safe for the week.
- Week 10 – None: For the first time series there was no temptation due to makeover week
- Week 11 – None: For the second week in a row there was no temptation due to the eliminated contestant challenges
- Week 12 – Living Room Booth: The contestants entered the living room full of four fridges full of their favorite foods. It was then explained that they have 24 hours to eat as much as they want to win immunity. However, they must eat any food or drink in a temptation booth for everyone to see and post it the calorie card into a mailbox with the person eating the most winning. Alex started temptation later than the others due to illness but played temptation as he had missed a lot of training and was unsure of being safe from elimination. Brenda thought about taking temptation for strategy and played but wasn't enough to be Alex who won Immunity.
- Week 13 – Cupcake heaven: Similar to a temptation from season 2, the contestants where faced with 150 cupcakes, each worth 113 calories. Three of the cupcakes had marked stickers (with stars), and the first to find a starred cupcake won immunity. After Lydia ate eight cupcakes, and Kasey four, as well as Margie, Bek & Brenda eating at least one cupcake each, Kasey was the first to find a marked cupcake, and immune for the week.
- Week 14 – None: There was no temptation this week due to face your fears week in Switzerland.
- Week 15 – None: There was no temptation this week due to contestants hosting the biggest loser cocktail party

=== Eliminations ===
- Week 1 – Selena (3–2): At the elimination, it came down to Hamish from the Blue Team and Selena from the White Team. The Black and Red teams were offered the option following voting to save both and not eliminate anyone, but only if it was a unanimous vote. Both Alex and Graham from the Black team abstained, but everyone else chose to vote (though it is implied that everyone, with the exception of Margie, were going to vote on not sending anyone home). After Margie was the first to choose to vote (for Selena), and Lisa tied it by voting for Hamish and Brenda and Simon respectively continued the trend, Selena's third vote came from Shane. Because she had the lowest percentage of weight loss, there was no need for Lydia's vote to be revealed. After elimination, when the trainers returned, they all told Margie that they never gave up on anyone and the Commando told Margie should start learning the stories of other contestants.
- Week 2 – Shane (4–2): After the Black and White teams fell below the yellow line, Shane and Michelle were put up for elimination. Unlike the previous week, the blue and red teams were required to vote this week. After Lydia, Ryan, Lisa and Luke had voted, the vote was left at 2–2. Brenda voted with the rest of her team and voted for Shane as she was closer to Michelle in the house. However, Hamish also voted for the same reason and voted for Shane, eliminating him. As a result of there already being a majority, Margie's vote was not revealed. After the reveal of The Bunker – a secret room where the trainers could spy on their teams – to the trainers, they were shocked to learn it was Shane who was put up by the Black team and eliminated, as he was the only physically fit member of his team.
- Week 3 – Brenda (4–2) : For the first time, the red team were below the yellow line along with the black team. The difference was only 0.01% between the bottom two teams. All the members from the blue team decided to eliminate Brenda, stating that the red team are the biggest threat in the game. The white team voted to eliminate Alex, except for Bek who voted for Brenda. After elimination, it was revealed that there was a female alliance (red and white teams), which had broken down after Brenda's departure.
- Week 4 – Ryan (4–0): After the boys lost the weigh-in, and with Hamish immune, the black team decided to put up Graham who had the lowest percentage weight loss, and initially Luke, who had the lowest for the blues. However, Ryan felt guilty that Luke would be up instead of him, and put himself up. Due to the perception that he did not work hard enough initially, he was then sent home unanimously.
- Week 5 – Bek (2–0) : After the white (under 30s women) and Black teams (Over 30s men) fell below the yellow line, Graham was put up for the black team for the second week in a row and although Rebekah voted for Selena to be nominated, however Michelle; Kasey and Selena voted for Rebekah to nominate herself as they believed she could make it on the outside. After both Graham and Rebekah had begged to be saved, the decisions were made. Margie voted for Rebekah as "she can do it on the outside and Graham needs to lose more weight" and Lisa also voted for Rebekah for similar reasons, meaning that Lydia and Hamish didn't need to reveal their votes.
- Week 6 – Hamish (3–1) : After falling 400g short of being above the yellow line, Hamish as the final blue team member was immediately put up for elimination. The black team put Graham up for the third week in a row, as Simon was immune and Alex had a lower weight percentage than Hamish and they expected that it would be a hung vote, with red voting for Hamish and white voting black. After both Hamish and Graham stated the reasons why they should stay, it was time to vote. Kasey predictably voted for Graham, and Lydia voted for Hamish. Selena brought the axe down on Hamish, voting for him saying Graham needed it more than Hamish. After a heartfelt goodbye, Hamish left Camp forever. This also meant that Shannan was gone due to having no members from his team.
- Week 7 – Selena (2–1): The Young Pups lost the weigh in, however not like the other eliminations, all the team were up and only the young pups could vote anyone except for Michelle as she was immune. Margie and Selena selected each other, and Kasey also sent Selena home (per her wishes). As she had the lowest percentage of weight loss, there was no need to see Michelle's vote, and she was sent home.
- Week 8 – Simon (3–2): At the weigh-in, Margie had the lowest percentage weight loss, but she had immunity and Alex's 2 kg weight penalty didn't push him below the yellow line. It was Simon and Lisa who were below the yellow line. The former black members, Graham and Alex voted for Lisa and the former red members voted for Simon. That meant the former white team members Kasey and Michelle got the deciding vote. In the end, Kasey voted for Simon because Simon still had weight to lose and Lisa didn't have much weight to lose. As he had a lower percentage of weight loss, he was sent home, and Michelle's vote was not revealed.
- Week 9 – Lisa (3–2): For the second week in a row, the person with immunity lost the least amount of weight – in this case Michelle. After everyone weighed in, Alex and Lisa were left below the Yellow Line. After Margie, Lydia and Graham voted along former team lines, it was left to the immune White girls to vote to send someone home. They both decided to break up the former Red Team, and sent Lisa home.
- Week 10 – Lydia (2–2) : Lydia fell below the yellow line with Michelle, after they'd both been over eating after makeover. Graham and Margie voted for Michelle because they were closer friends with Lydia; Alex voted strategically and voted for Lydia and Kasey voted for Lydia also because Michelle was at one point, part of the white team with her. Because Lydia had a lower percentage of weight loss, she was eliminated via default. However, after exiting, she was approached by Shannan, who took her away.
- Week 11 – Lisa/Simon: After the 5 eliminated contestants weighed in; Simon, Lisa and Bek fell below the yellow line and faced elimination or as it was called salvation as the official contestants had to decide which one of the three should return to the competition. Brenda voted for Bek due to the connection made over the week. Michelle and Kasey also voted for Bek due to being original white team even though of the fraction after previously putting her up for elimination. While Lydia and Margie voted for their old friend Lisa, Alex voted for Bek strategically and Bek returned leaving Simon and Lisa being sent home.
- Week 12 – Michelle (3–2): Michelle and Margie fell below the yellow line. After Lydia and Kasey voted along former team lines, Alex gave Margie her second vote due to loyalty to Michelle. However, Brenda and Graham both voted for Michelle, and as she had the lowest weight loss percentage in the weigh in, she was sent home.
- Week 13 – Lydia (3–1): Lydia and Graham fell below the yellow line, due to Lydia's weight gain from temptation and not being able to work it off because of her knee injury. Alex and Bec both voted for Lydia, while Margie voted for Graham. Despite recently making a promise not to vote for Lydia a few days earlier, Kasey voted for Lydia due to a separate promise she made never to vote for Graham. Lydia was sent home, and Brenda's vote did not need to be seen.
- Week 14 – Graham (Challenge): As a result of the Super Challenge in Switzerland, Graham and Alex had each chosen the two pieces of food with the most calories – the Toblerone chocolate for Graham and the Potato Rösti for Alex. In the end, it was Graham who was holding the most calories and was therefore eliminated immediately.
- Week 14 – Bek (2–1): Kasey and Bek fell below the yellow line. After Brenda voted for Kasey due to her loyalty to Bek, Alex voted for Bek. Margie had the final vote, and for the second time, she sent Bek home.
- Week 15 – None: Kasey and Margie fell below the Yellow Line, and it was down to Alex and Brenda to decide who would join them in the final. Just before they revealed their votes, Hayley offered them a choice, identical to Week 1 – if no-one revealed their vote, no-one went home. Both Alex and Brenda took this opportunity to make it a final four and not send anyone home.

Contestant	Wk 1	Wk 2	Wk 3	Wk 4	Wk 5	Wk 6	Wk 7	Wk 8	Wk 9	Wk 10	Wk 11	Wk 12	Wk 13	Wk 14	Wk 15
Margie	Selena	?	X	Ryan	Rebekah	Hamish	Selena	Simon	Alex	Michelle	Lisa	X	Graham	Bek	X
Alex	X	X	Y	X	X	X	X	Lisa	X	Lydia	Bek	Margie	Lydia	Bek	X
Kasey	X	X	Alex	?	X	Graham	?	Simon	Lisa	Lydia	Bek	Margie	Lydia	X	X
Brenda	Selena	Shane	Y								Bek	Michelle	?	Kasey	X
Bek	X	X	Brenda	Ryan	Y						X	?	Lydia	X	
Graham	X	X	X	Y	Y	Y	X	Lisa	Lisa	Michelle	?	Michelle	X		
Lydia	?	Shane	X	Ryan	?	Hamish	X	Simon	Alex	X	Lisa	Michelle	X		
Michelle	X	Y	Alex	Ryan	X	?	Selena	?	Lisa	X	Bek	X			
Lisa	Hamish	Shane	X	?	Rebekah	?	X	X	X		X				
Simon	Hamish	X	X	X	X	X	X	X			X				
Selena	Y		?	?	X	Hamish	Margie								
Hamish	Y	Shane	Brenda	X	?	Y									
Luke	X	Michelle	Brenda	X											
Ryan	X	Michelle	Brenda	Y											
Shane	Selena	Y													
James	X														
Eliminated	Selena (3–2 votes)	Shane (4–2 votes)	Brenda (4–2 votes)	Ryan (4–0 votes)	Bek (2–0 votes)	Hamish (3–1 votes)	Selena (2–1 votes)	Simon (3–2 votes)	Lisa (3–2 votes)	Lydia (2–2 votes, eliminated by default)	Lisa (2 votes to save)	Michelle (3–2 votes)	Lydia (3–1 votes)	Bek (2–1 votes)	None
Eliminated	Selena (3–2 votes)	Shane (4–2 votes)	Brenda (4–2 votes)	Ryan (4–0 votes)	Bek (2–0 votes)	Hamish (3–1 votes)	Selena (2–1 votes)	Simon (3–2 votes)	Lisa (3–2 votes)	Lydia (2–2 votes, eliminated by default)	Simon (0 votes to save)	Michelle (3–2 votes)	Lydia (3–1 votes)	Bek (2–1 votes)	None

- In week 11, the contestants were voting to bring back a previously eliminated contestant, from between Bek, Simon & Lisa, Bek was voted back into the game.

Immunity
X Immunity, not allowed to vote
Y Below Yellow line and put up for elimination from team
X Below yellow line, not allowed to vote
? Below yellow line, vote not revealed
Below yellow line, valid vote cast
? Vote not revealed (Hidden vote)
X Abstained from vote
Returned to the competition
Eliminated or not in house
Valid vote cast
X Not allowed to vote
Winner ($220,000)

=== Controversy ===
Originally, there was controversy that they had made a series with part of the focus being on fixing up some couples together. There was also controversy after James, a 22-year-old who works at a service station, took $30 000 over his position in the game and immunity. James explained it was due mainly, if not solely, to financial issues. However, the majority of controversy has been from an expulsion from the camp. After Week 5's challenge, the contestants decided to have a party outside their bedrooms in the sleeping area when Luke (under 30s male) supplied alcohol for the other contestants. After he had drunk a lot, he began to become rowdy and stumbling around and slurring his speech. As a result of his behaviour, Shannan, his trainer, sent him home to see professional help. Luke is allowed to return for the finale, but is ineligible to win the end money or prize and is also not able to win the eliminated contestants award, leaving 20-year-old Hamish as the last remaining blue team member.

== Ratings ==
This season, ratings have dropped considerably low compared to other seasons, with viewers averaging 750,000, and having not being able to score about one million viewers.

n/a	Data unavailable
—	Program did not rank in nightly top shows

#	Episode	Original airdate	Timeslot	Viewers (millions)	Nightly rank
1	"Launch"	23 January 2012	Monday 7:00 pm–8:00 pm	0.897	#11
2	"First Weigh-In"	24 January 2012	Tuesday 7:00 pm–8:00 pm	0.825	#12
3	"Temptation"	25 January 2012	Wednesday 7:00 pm–8:00 pm	0.759	#10
4	"Challenge"	26 January 2012	Thursday 7:00 pm–8:00 pm	0.612	#15
5	"Weigh-In and Elimination"	30 January 2012	Monday 7:00 pm–8:00 pm	0.698	#16
6	"Contest"	31 January 2012	Tuesday 7:00 pm–8:00 pm	0.712	#12
7	"Temptation #2"	1 February 2012	Wednesday 7:00 pm–8:00 pm	0.757	#10
8	"Challenge #2"	2 February 2012	Thursday 7:00 pm–8:00 pm	0.734	#9
9	"Weigh-In and Elimination #2"	6 February 2012	Monday 7:00 pm–8:00 pm	0.811	#12
10	"Contest #2"	7 February 2012	Tuesday 7:00 pm–8:00 pm	0.697	#11
11	"Temptation #3"	8 February 2012	Wednesday 7:00 pm–8:00 pm	0.718	#9
12	"Challenge #3"	9 February 2012	Thursday 7:00 pm–8:00 pm	0.679	#11
13	"Weigh-In and Elimination #3"	13 February 2012	Monday 7:00 pm–8:00 pm	0.776	#16
14	"Contest #3"	14 February 2012	Tuesday 7:00 pm–8:00 pm	0.716	#15
15	"Temptation #4"	15 February 2012	Wednesday 7:00 pm–8:00 pm	0.712	#11
16	"Challenge #4"	16 February 2012	Thursday 7:00 pm–8:00 pm	0.710	#10
17	"Friday"	17 February 2012	Friday 7:00 pm–7:30 pm	0.607	#10
18	"Weigh-In and Elimination #4"	20 February 2012	Monday 7:00 pm–8:00 pm	0.879	#13
19	"Contest #4"	21 February 2012	Tuesday 7:00 pm–8:00 pm	0.656	#17
20	"Temptation #5"	22 February 2012	Wednesday 7:00 pm–8:00 pm	0.666	#13
21	"Challenge #5"	23 February 2012	Thursday 7:00 pm–8:00 pm	0.709	#9
22	"Friday #2"	24 February 2012	Friday 7:00 pm–7:30 pm	0.559	#12
23	"Weigh-In and Elimination #5"	27 February 2012	Monday 7:00 pm–8:00 pm	0.945	#12
24	"Contest #5"	28 February 2012	Tuesday 7:00 pm–8:00 pm	0.919	#9
25	"Temptation #6"	29 February 2012	Wednesday 7:00 pm–8:00 pm	0.856	#9
26	"Challenge #6"	1 March 2012	Thursday 7:00 pm–8:00 pm	0.804	#10
27	"Friday #3"	2 March 2012	Friday 7:00 pm–7:30 pm	0.582	#11
28	"Weigh-In and Elimination #6"	5 March 2012	Monday 7:00 pm–8:00 pm	0.862	#13
29	"Contest #6"	6 March 2012	Tuesday 7:00 pm–8:00 pm	0.864	#9
30	"Temptation #7"	7 March 2012	Wednesday 7:00 pm–8:00 pm	0.849	#9
31	"Challenge #7"	8 March 2012	Thursday 7:00 pm–8:00 pm	0.795	#9
32	"Friday #4"	9 March 2012	Friday 7:00 pm–7:30 pm	0.636	#11
33	"Weigh-In & Elimination #7"	12 March 2012	Monday 7:00 pm–8:00 pm	0.942	#11
34	"Contest #7"	13 March 2012	Tuesday 7:00 pm–8:00 pm	0.830	#10
35	"Temptation #8"	14 March 2012	Wednesday 7:00 pm–8:00 pm	0.853	#9
36	"Challenge #8"	15 March 2012	Thursday 7:00 pm–8:00 pm	0.861	#8
37	"Friday #5"	16 March 2012	Friday 7:00 pm–7:30 pm	0.597	#13
38	"Weigh-In & Elimination #8"	19 March 2012	Monday 7:00 pm–8:00 pm	0.883	#12
39	"Contest #8"	20 March 2012	Tuesday 7:00 pm–8:00 pm	0.769	#11
40	"Temptation #9"	21 March 2012	Wednesday 7:00 pm–8:00 pm	0.835	#10
41	"Challenge #9"	22 March 2012	Thursday 7:00 pm–8:00 pm	0.805	#10
42	"Friday #6"	23 March 2012	Friday 7:00 pm–7:30 pm	0.614	#12
43	"Weigh-In & Elimination #9"	25 March 2012	Sunday 6:30 pm–7:30 pm	0.971	#8
44	"Contest #9"	26 March 2012	Monday 7:00 pm–8:00 pm	0.922	#10
45	"Temptation #10"	27 March 2012	Tuesday 7:00 pm–8:00 pm	0.872	#10
46	"Challenge #10"	28 March 2012	Wednesday 7:00 pm–8:00 pm	0.934	#7
46	"Thursday"	29 March 2012	Thursday 7:00 pm–8:00 pm	0.691	#7
47	"Weigh-In & Elimination #10"	1 April 2012	Sunday 6:30 pm–7:30 pm	1.005	#6
48	"Contest #10"	2 April 2012	Monday 7:00 pm–8:00 pm	0.982	#8
49	"Temptation #11"	3 April 2012	Tuesday 7:00 pm–7:30 pm	0.864	#8
50	"Challenge #11"	4 April 2012	Wednesday 7:00 pm–7:30 pm	0.881	#7
51	"Weigh-In & Elimination #11"	8 April 2012	Sunday 6:30 pm–7:30 pm	0.802	#6
52	"Contest #11"	9 April 2012	Monday 7:00 pm–8:00 pm	1.016	#5
53	"Temptation #12"	10 April 2012	Tuesday 7:00 pm–8:00 pm	0.951	#7
54	"Challenge #12"	11 April 2012	Wednesday 7:00 pm–8:00 pm	1.001	#7
