= The Biggest Loser Australia season 8 =

The Biggest Loser Australia
- Season 8
- Starring: Michelle Bridges; Shannan Ponton; Steve Willis (The Commando)
- No. of episodes: 35

Release
- Original network: Network Ten
- Original release: 17 March – 28 May 2013

Season chronology
- ← Previous; Season 7 Next → Season 9

The eighth season of the Australian version of the original NBC reality television series The Biggest Loser, known as The Biggest Loser Australia: The Next Generation, premiered on 17 March 2013 on Network Ten. This particular season has set a worldwide record, introducing the heaviest contestant in all of Biggest Loser history, Kevin Moore. Kevin along with his mother Rosemary have a combined weight of 355 kg (783 lbs). He weighs 255 kg (562 lbs) himself alone. It also featured the youngest contestant ever on the Australian series - Todd Nester, who was 15 years old. Season 8 of The Biggest Loser was won by the Orange team, Robyn & Katie.

== Host and personalities ==
Host: Hayley Lewis has returned for her fourth season as host.

Trainers: Shannan Ponton, Michelle Bridges and Steve Willis ("The Commando")

== Game variations ==
- Teams: All the teams this season are composed of parent-child teams - either mother-daughter, mother-son, father-daughter or father-son. The trainers took turns in training the contestants, but in Week 8 the teams chose which trainer to train with for the rest of the competition. Green and Grey chose Shannan, Orange and Light Blue chose the Commando, and Red and Pink chose Michelle.
- Age limit: As part of the theme of attempting to fix the obesity problem by tackling generational obesity, the lower limit for taking part now became 15. There is, however, only one 15-year-old - Green Team's Todd Nester.
- Winners: To ensure that no children would be left alone at campus, all teams enter campus, compete in challenges, weigh in, vote and leave campus as a pair. As a result of this, there will be a joint Biggest Loser title awarded to the winning team, and a prize of $200,000 split between them.
- The Fridge: Replacing the Walk and the Contest will be a new challenge dubbed The Fridge.
- Schedule: The schedule was initially trimmed down from a four-show week to a three-show week, now on Sunday, Monday and Tuesday.
- The Heavyweights: As a twist in Week 2, two extra pairs, dubbed The Heavyweights, were introduced, one of whom is the heaviest contestant ever worldwide.

=== Schedule ===
This year, the schedule changed from four to three nights a week. This changed to Sunday, Monday, Tuesday. In week 10, an extra Wednesday show was added to include face your fears week and the super challenge.

Sunday - Last chance training, Weigh-in, Elimination

Monday - The Fridge

Tuesday - Major Challenge

Wednesday - (Week 10 Only) Completion of Super Challenge

=== Teams ===
Name	Couples Team	Relationship	Status	Total votes	Notes
Kevin & Rosemary	Blue Team	Mother & Son	Eliminated Week 3	0	Kevin returned to the Biggest Loser in Series 9
Chris & Mark	Black Team	Father & Son	Eliminated Week 5	3	
Anita & Cher	Yellow Team	Mother & Daughter	Eliminated Week 6	3	
Sam & Jess	Red Team	Father & Daughter	Eliminated Week 2 Re-eliminated Week 8	4, 2	
Brett & Mandy	Grey Team	Mother & Son	Eliminated Week 9	3	
Janet & Kirsten	Pink Team	Mother & Daughter	Eliminated Week 4 Re-eliminated Week 10'	3, 2	
Richard & Amber	Light Blue Team	Father & Daughter	3rd Place		
Gerald & Todd	Green Team	Father & Son	2nd Place		
Robyn & Katie	Orange Team	Mother & Daughter	Winners		

=== Weigh-ins ===
Contestants are listed in reverse chronological order of elimination.

Contestant	Age	Height	Starting BMI	Current BMI	Starting weight	Week											Finale	Weight lost	Percentage lost
Contestant	Age	Height	Starting BMI	Current BMI	Starting weight	1	2	3	4	5	6	7		8	9	10	Finale	Weight lost	Percentage lost
Katie	19	164	50.9	33.2	136.8	128.0	121.0	117.7	115.4	110.9	108.5	X	106.2	102.9	99.0	95.5	89.2	-47.6	-34.80%
Robyn	45	166	40.7	26.5	112.1	104.4	98.0	95.6	94.1	89.6	86.8	X	84.7	82.5	81.4	77.4	73.1	-39.0	-34.88%
Todd	15	167	40.2	26.7	112.2	105.5	99.3	95.0	93.2	90.3	88.4	X	86.6	84.3	81.8	78.7	74.4	-37.8	-33.69%
Gerald	52	168	56.4	36.4	159.1	145.0	137.0	130.8	126.9	125.8	123.5	X	121.3	118.0	112.5	109.3	102.7	-56.4	-35.45%
Amber	20	165	41.0	31.1	111.6	107.3	103.0	101.6	99.5	97.7	95.6	X	94.4	92.9	90.8	89.2	84.7	-26.9	-24.10%
Richard	45	174	46.1	31.3	139.7	133.3	126.1	121.5	119.0	115.9	113.0	X	110.1	108.4	104.5	102.0	94.9	-44.8	-32.07%
Janet	52	157	43.2	27.8	106.6	99.7	94.2	92.9	90.6			86.6	83.1	80.0	77.0	74.7	68.6	-38.0	-35.65%
Kirsten	20	160	38.3	27.5	98.1	93.9	88.9	87.2	86.0			83.4	80.6	79.1	77.0	74.5	70.4	-27.7	-28.24%
Brett	23	196	48.9	34.0	187.9	174.8	166.0	160.0	155.1	151.9	148.8	X	145.8	142.8	139.0		130.5	-57.4	-30.55%
Mandy	53	161	43.7	30.0	113.3	105.8	99.3	97.0	94.5	92.1	90.9	X	88.4	85.5	83.2		77.7	-35.6	-31.42%
Sam	42	168	45.8	33.6	129.4	120.9	116.0					108.7	103.5	99.9			94.8	-34.6	-26.74%
Jess	21	166	48.7	38.1	134.1	129.7	123.2					117.8	114.4	113.1			105.0	-29.1	-21.70%
Chris	48	172	51.5	36.4	152.3	143.4	134.8	132.2	129.3	126.9		125.6	122.3				107.6	-44.7	-29.35%
Mark	23	175	53.2	36.6	162.9	153.6	142.4	138.7	134.7	132.0		130.5	126.3				112.2	-50.7	-31.12%
Cher	22	165	63.3	52.0	172.2	X	161.0	160.5	157.8	154.4	152.0	152.0					141.6	-30.6	-17.77%
Anita	41	163	44.3	32.4	117.6	X	108.0	106.1	102.7	101.0	99.8	99.8					86.0	-31.6	-26.87%
Rosemary	54	161	38.6	30.6	100.1	X	91.8	91.6				89.9					79.2	-20.9	-20.88%
Kevin	27	174	84.1	65.6	254.7	X	241.5	239.3				230.4					198.6	-56.1	-22.03%

Contestants

- Below the Yellow Line
- The week's biggest loser
- Had immunity for the week
- Weigh-in for previously eliminated contestants
- Won Weigh-in pass based on weigh-in or competition (for previously eliminated contestants)
- Last Person Eliminated before finale
- Winner (among finalists)
- Winner (among eliminated)
- Did not weight-in

BMIs

- Healthy Body Mass Index (less than 25.0 BMI)
- Overweight Body Mass Index (25.0 - 29.9 BMI)
- Obese Class I (30.0 - 34.9 BMI)
- Obese Class II Index (35.0 - 39.9 BMI)
- Obese Class III (40.0 or above)

Notes

- In week 4, Gerald & Todd were award a "Progress Weigh-in" via The Fridge, which allowed them to weigh-in mid-week to evaluate their progress.
- In week 5, only one person's weight loss was counted for the weigh in for each team, and whose it would be was decided between the team members. The contestants who had their weight loss counted were Chris, Brett, Richard, Todd, Anita and Katie.

=== Leaderboard ===
Contestant	Age	Height	Starting BMI	Starting Weight	Current BMI	Current Weight	Kg	Percent
Gerald	52	168	56.4	159.1	36.4	102.7	-56.4	-35.45%
Robyn	45	166	40.7	112.1	26.5	73.1	-39.0	-34.79%
Katie	19	164	50.9	136.8	33.2	89.2	-47.6	-34.79%
Todd	15	167	40.2	112.2	28.2	74.4	-37.8	-33.69%
Richard	45	174	46.1	139.7	33.7	94.9	-33.8	-32.07%
Amber	20	165	41.0	111.6	32.8	84.7	-26.9	-24.10%

Team	Starting Weight	Current Weight	Kg	Percent
Orange Team	248.9	162.3	-86.6	-34.79%
Green Team	271.3	177.1	-94.2	-34.72%
Light Blue Team	251.3	179.6	-71.7	-28.53%

=== Weight loss history ===
Contestant	Week 1	Week 2	Week 3	Week 4	Week 5	Week 6	Week 7		Week 8	Week 9	Week 10	Finale
Robyn	-7.7	-6.4	-2.4	-1.5	-4.5	-2.8	X	-2.1	-2.2	-1.1	-4.0	-4.3
Katie	-8.8	-7.0	-3.3	-2.3	-4.5	-2.4	X	-2.3	3.3	-3.9	-3.5	-6.3
Gerald	-14.1	-8.0	-6.2	-3.9	-1.1	-2.3	X	-2.2	-3.3	-5.5	-3.2	-6.6
Todd	-6.7	-6.2	-4.3	-1.8	-2.9	-1.9	X	-1.8	-2.3	-2.5	-3.1	-4.3
Richard	-6.4	-7.2	-4.6	-2.5	-3.1	-2.9	X	-2.9	-1.7	-3.9	-2.5	-6.1
Amber	-4.3	-4.3	-1.4	-2.1	-1.8	-2.1	X	-1.2	-1.5	-2.1	-1.6	-4.5
Janet	-6.9	-5.5	-1.3	-2.3			-4.0	-3.5	-3.1	-3.0	-2.3	-6.1
Kirsten	-4.2	-5.0	-1.7	-1.2			-2.6	-2.8	-1.5	-2.1	-2.5	-4.1
Mandy	-7.5	-6.5	-2.3	-2.5	-2.4	-1.2	X	-2.5	-2.9	-2.3		-5.5
Brett	-13.1	-8.8	-6.0	-4.9	-3.2	-3.1	X	-3.0	-3.0	-3.8		-8.4
Sam	-8.5	-4.9					-7.3	-5.2	-3.6			-5.1
Jess	-4.4	-6.5					-5.4	-3.4	-1.3			-8.1
Chris	-8.9	-8.6	-2.6	-2.9	-2.4		-1.3	-3.3				-14.7
Mark	-9.3	-11.2	-3.7	-4.0	-2.7		-1.5	-4.2				-14.1
Cher	X	-11.2	-0.5	-2.7	-3.4	-2.4	-0.0					-10.4
Anita	X	-9.6	-1.9	-3.4	-1.7	-1.2	-0.0					-13.8
Rosemary	X	-8.3	-0.2				-1.7					-10.7
Kevin	X	-13.2	-2.2				-8.9					-31.8

=== Percentage loss history ===
Contestant	Week 1	Week 2	Week 3	Week 4	Week 5	Week 6	Week 7		Week 8	Week 9	Week 10	Finale
Robyn	-6.87%	-6.13%	-2.45%	-1.57%	-4.78%	-3.13%	X	-2.42%	-2.60%	-1.33%	-4.91%	-5.56%
Katie	-6.43%	-5.47%	-2.73%	-1.95%	-3.90%	-2.16%	X	-2.12%	-3.11%	-3.79%	-3.54%	-6.60%
Gerald	-8.86%	-5.52%	-4.53%	-2.98%	-0.87%	-1.83%	X	-1.78%	-2.72%	-4.66%	-2.84%	-6.04%
Todd	-5.97%	-5.88%	-4.33%	-1.89%	-3.11%	-2.10%	X	-2.04%	-2.66%	-2.97%	-3.79%	-5.46%
Richard	-4.58%	-5.40%	-3.65%	-2.06%	-2.61%	-2.50%	X	-2.57%	-1.54%	-3.60%	-2.39%	-5.98%
Amber	-3.85%	-4.01%	-1.36%	-2.07%	-1.81%	-2.15%	X	-1.26%	-1.59%	-2.26%	-1.76%	-5.04%
Janet	-6.47%	-5.52%	-1.38%	-2.48%			-4.42%	-4.04%	-3.73%	-3.75%	-2.99%	-8.17%
Kirsten	-4.28%	-5.32%	-1.91%	-1.38%			-3.02%	-3.36%	-1.86%	-2.65%	-3.25%	-5.50%
Mandy	-6.62%	-6.14%	-2.32%	-2.58%	-2.54%	-1.30%	X	-2.75%	-3.28%	-2.69%		-6.61%
Brett	-6.97%	-5.03%	-3.61%	-3.06%	-2.06%	-2.04%	X	-2.02%	-2.05%	-2.66%		-6.04%
Sam	-6.57%	-4.05%					-6.29%	-4.78%	-3.48%			-5.12%
Jess	-3.28%	-5.01%					-4.38%	-2.89%	-1.14%			-7.16%
Chris	-5.84%	-6.00%	-1.93%	-2.19%	-1.86%		-1.02%	-2.63%				-12.02%
Mark	-5.71%	-7.29%	-2.60%	-2.88%	-2.00%		-1.14%	-3.22%				-11.16%
Anita	X	-8.16%	-1.76%	-3.20%	-1.66%	-1.19%	-0.00%					-13.83%
Cher	X	-6.50%	-0.31%	-1.68%	-2.15%	-1.55%	-0.00%					-6.84%
Rosemary	X	-8.29%	-0.22%				-1.86%					-11.90%
Kevin	X	-5.18%	-0.91%				-3.72%					-13.80%

=== Major Challenges ===
- Week 1 - Man vs Machine - As of the 100 kg challenge given by Hayley, the prize for the first challenge was a 500g weight advantage each on the scale towards the 100 kg target, meaning that the contestants would only had to lose 93 kg as a group. For this challenge, they arrived at Camden Airport and were told that they had to move a skip full of their combined body weight as a group of 14 (1,856.1 kg) down a 50m track to the finish line. While they would be pulling this, they would race against an L-39 air combat Australia fighter jet plane which would fly to Canberra and back which would take approximately 30 minutes to make a 570 km round trip. The Commando was the co-pilot and would radio Shannon on the ground to keep track of the location of the plane. The contestants started off at a great pace with Katie and Jess taking charge but started to slow down at the halfway point. As they reached the finish line, the pace slowed. With seconds to spare, the contestants crossed the line just as the plane was about to come into land and won the advantage.
- Week 2 - Half Marathon - The nine couples were split into three teams of three couples. Each team were attached to a trainer. Shannon's team consisted of Gerald and Todd, Mandy and Brett and Anita and Cher. The commando's team consisted of Robyn and Katie, Mark and Chris and Kevin and Rosemary. Leaving Michelle's team consisting of Sam and Jess, Richard and Amber and Janet and Kirsten. Each couple had to at least complete one 3 km lap. Each couple would also be tethered together. The winning team to complete the 21 km first would receive a 1 kg advantage for each couple on the scales. The race started with Mark and Chris taking the lead followed by Richard and Amber then Gerald and Todd. Mark and Chris started to fall behind after Chris's constant stopping. Richard and Amber were first back giving Michelle's team the lead. Shannon's team fell into last after Brett slowed down due to back pain causing for Robyn and Katie to pass them causing Brett to explode at Shannon. Robyn and Katie overtook Kristin and Janet giving Rosemary and Kevin a small lead over Michelle's team. Though Kevin and Rosemary walked nearly entire way, they ended up completing it giving it a personal achievement for Kevin. On their second lap, the tension between Chris and Mark erupted to Chris unclipping the tether. Getting near the end, Robyn and Katie passed Mandy and Brett falling Shannon's team to last place. It ended up being a race between Janet and Kirsten and Chris and Mark but Janet and Kirsten won for Michelle's team giving, Janet and Kirsten, Richard and Amber and Sam and Jess a 1 kg advantage.
- Week 3 - Flushed Away - Teams were brought out to the garden where in their couples, each team member had to balance on a beam while holding one arm in the air, attached to their wrist will be a chain, if they lower their arm, the trough will tip forward soaking them with water then they will be out. If they step off their beam they are out also. The last team standing wins immunity. Instantly as the challenge starts, Kevin struggles and in seconds the blue team was out. While signaling to Todd, Chris stepped off for a second so the Black team were out. Amber let a few trickles out but regained focus while Mandy and Brett were starting to struggle but then the orange team started to leak just before the grey team were next out. The light blue and yellow teams showed to be in considerable pain and not long the light blue team were out to the anger of Amber. Then not long followed by the orange team. The green team tried to distract the pink team to no avail. The green team was next to go leaving the pink and yellow teams left. Finally, Cher could not take the pain giving the pink team immunity.
- Week 4 - Spartan Race - The teams arrived at the spartan race course where the contestants had to navigate the hardest challenge ever on the show and the toughest of its kind on the planet. It's a 3 km assault course where the teams have to climb over massive dunes and crawl through mud pits, throw spears and fae real gladiators. The winning team gets a 1 kg advantage while the last 2 teams get a 0.5 kg penalty each at the weigh in. Mandy had to compete on her own due to Brett in the hospital. The green team took an early lead with the black and light blue teams close on their heels. Cher injured her bottom when entering the mud pit and Anita was given the option to go it alone and Anita took off with Mandy not far in front of her. After the mud lake, the green and light blue teams were neck and neck but green got back a bit of a lead when Amber started to struggle on the cargo net. Though the light blue team nearly caught up, the green team won and got the 1 kg advantage just followed by light blue then orange. While Mandy was closing the gap to pink, the black team came 4th with the pink team coming 5th leaving the grey and yellow came last and got the 0.5 kg penalty each.
- Week 5 - Surf Boat Race - This challenge is similar to that of the surf boat challenge of Season 3. For the week the contestants were split into their parents and kids teams, and so competed in this teams. Four members of each team would row the boats out into the bay for a total trip of 2 km. Once back at shore, the teams would have to run to the other side of the beach and move their boat across the sand using only one inflatable roller to the finish line. The winning team would win a low-calorie luxury fine dining experience whilst watching the losing team face a grueling training session with the trainers. The parents got an early lead but the kids caught up and passed them, and the two teams kept overtaking each other throughout the race. Eventually the parents won the challenge and watched their children train in mud by all three trainers while enjoying their dinner.
- Week 6 - Mind vs Muscle - The contestants at the house entered the main gym for the challenge, and as Anita was in hospital the yellow team did not compete. There the contestants were joined by their partners at home via video chat. The challenge was for the at home contestants to answer multiple choice questions on exercise and nutrition while the house contestants held a basket off the ground via pulley. If the home contestants get the question right then no weight is added but if it is wrong, a 2.5 kg brick will be added to their partner's basket. If they drop the basket or step off their platform, they are out. The last team standing wins a 1 kg advantage at the weigh in. In the spin bike mini challenge, Cher came last with 68.24 km. Then Amber came next with 80.20 km followed by Todd with 100 km. Robyn did 108.7 km and Mandy did 156 km winning the advantage for the grey team which was that all teams part grey receiving 5 kg in their baskets. At the start of the challenge, Todd was getting the questions wrong while Gerald was looking rather relaxed but started to feel it after 17.5 kg and was soon the first out. Then Amber was going on a wrong answer streak while Brett was struggling with only being able to use one arm due to injury and soon they were the next out. While Richard was struggling, Katie was looking very relaxed and as the weigh piled up, Richard dropped leading to orange winning the challenge and the 1 kg advantage.
- Week 7 - Lost - The three remaining eliminated teams who did not have a weigh in pass (Yellow, Pink and Blue) met Hayley on the top of a cliff at Glenworth Valley. The challenge was for the teams to complete an obstacle course using a map provided while answering various multiple choice questions on food and nutrition along the way. At the end of the course was a helicopter containing the final weigh-in pass. The pink team took the lead immediately, but soon started to bicker about where to go, while Kevin fell over putting the Blue team in last place. The Pink team got the first question wrong twice and were set back both times as a result, allowing the Yellow and Blue teams to catch up. The Pink team soon took the lead back, but their constant arguing had the Yellow team close behind. The next obstacle had each team digging to find tunnels for them to crawl through, putting them all back on an even playing field. The Pink team finished first but got the next question wrong twice in a row again, frustrating them further and leading to more arguing. They managed to keep the lead, with Yellow just behind and the Blue team behind them. The Pink team finished the broken bridge obstacle just as the others arrived. After finally getting a question right they kept a safe lead through the mud pit, and though they struggled at the Wall of Pain, they managed to get over it and into the helicopter with the weigh-in passes, leaving the Yellow and Blue teams in the mud pit being sent home.
- Week 8 - Enjoy the Treadmill - All the contestants entered a room full of treadmills, and after putting on a vest weighing the amount of weight they had lost so far they each had to walk on a treadmill for as long as they could. Every 10 minutes the speed would be increased by half a kilometre. The prize for winning was immunity which many teams saw as an advantage purely to dissolve the alliance between the Orange and Light Blue teams. The first to drop out after 30 minutes was Brett, who was wearing the heaviest vest and was having trouble breathing. Following Brett was Janet, Gerald and Amber, and soon after that the contestants were dropping out quickly until it was Todd, Robyn, Richard and Sam left. Many contestants had passed out and the remaining were feeling the strain, but Sam and Robyn eventually stepped off the treadmill to leave Richard and Todd to battle it out. While Todd's youth and energy helped him get that far, it wasn't enough to beat out Richard's endurance which won the Light Blue team immunity for the week.
- Week 9 - 5-Way Tug of War - The contestants entered a circular arena, which had 5 pairs of paddles spaced around the edge, and were told that the challenge was a traditional 5 way tug of war. Each team was harnessed to a chain and the aim was to be the first team to collect both of their respective paddles. The prize for winning this challenge was a half kilo weight advantage going into the weigh-in; for coming last, it was a half kilo weight penalty. The first team to get a paddle was the Green team, followed by the Orange team. The Orange team eventually collected their second paddle, thus winning the challenge and the half kilo weight advantage. However, Mandy had her leg caught in the chain and was injured, so the Green team decided to help out the Grey team by pulling in their direction. As a result, the Grey team came second, leaving it between the Green, Light Blue and Pink teams. Since the Pink team was naturally at a disadvantage as the lightest team they formed an alliance with the Light Blue team so that the Pink girls would come third, leaving the Light Blue's to battle with the Green team in a two-way tug of war. However, once the Light Blue's got their first paddle with the Pink's help they went back on their word and took their second paddle without returning the favour. This left the Green team against the Pink team which the former won with ease, giving the Pink team a half kilo weight penalty.
- Week 10 - Nature's Way New Zealand Super Challenge - The major challenge this week was set over several days in smaller parts, with the winner of each getting an advantage in the next. The overall winning team would win a golden ticket straight to finale. The last team would have a one kilo weight penalty. This challenge was sponsored by the main sponsors of the program, Nature's Way vitamins.

*Leg 1 - Hike - The first challenge was a bush-bash through a rough, mountainous terrain with both team members tethered together. The Pink team fell behind immediately and stayed in last position due to their constant arguing, with the Green team catching up to the front and taking first place. The Light Blue team came in second, gaining a one-minute penalty for the next race, followed by Orange team with a two-minute penalty and Pink being set back four minutes for the race.

*Leg 2 - Hike and Raft - With the benefit of no penalty, the Green team took off first on a 5 kilometre hike across a track tethered together, followed by Light Blue, Orange, and then Pink team starting last with a 5-minute penalty (an extra minute was added to the four-minute penalty for not completing the giant swing task the previous day). The Green team maintained a good lead until they reached the raft-building, where the Light Blue and Orange teams took over. The Pink team's arguing was still going, keeping them behind. The Light Blue hit the water first, followed by the Orange team who were finding it difficult to paddle and were not getting anywhere. The Green team overtook them, while the Pink team were still struggling in last place as their raft started to fall apart. The Light Blue team took first place, winning a night's stay in the luxurious Matakauri Lodge. The Green team's prize for second place was a night in a Britz campervan, with Orange winning a night camping in tent and the Pink team having to sleep under the stars with bare essentials.

*Leg 3 - Cycle and White-Water Raft - The next leg was a 10 kilometre cycle across a rocky and mountainous terrain, but for this the team members did not have to stay together. Light Blue took off first with their advantage from the previous challenge, followed by Green, Orange, then Pink. Richard took a strong lead leaving Amber behind, but allowing Todd to catch up with him. They both got to a point where they realised they had to go back for their other team member, so Richard went back to help Amber while Todd supported his father up a mountain. The Green team took the lead after this, but Katie was speeding along the track and caught up with them at the end of the 10 kilometres. Janet was left in last place as she struggled with the bike, but Kirsten sped up to be neck and neck with Robyn in second last place. At the white-water rafting Katie had to wait for her mother before going in the water, giving Green team a further lead in the race. Once Robyn arrived with Kirsten just behind, Orange team took second place leaving Light Blue in third and Pink in last once again. Green successfully completed the race in first place, followed by Orange, Light Blue, and Pink.

*Leg 4 - Golden Ticket Race - The final leg of the challenge involved each team canoeing down a river, then a 5 kilometre trek to the finish line while tethered to their partner. In the last 2.5 kilometres each contestant had to put on a backpack weighing all the weight they had lost so far. The Green team took off first with their advantage, followed by Orange who struggled getting out of the shallow water. Light Blue was next, quickly overtaking Orange and catching up with Green so they were neck and neck the whole way. Pink was last but also took advantage of the Orange's paddling troubles and overtook them. Both Green and Light Blue reached the shore at the same time, and both teams remained very much equal until putting on the backpacks where the Green team fell behind. Pink kept their third place until the backpacks where Janet fell over and had trouble getting back up with all the extra weight. Light Blue reached the finish line first, winning the golden ticket straight to finale. Gerald from the Green team collapsed due to breathing difficulties, but managed to finish the race in second place, followed by Orange and then Pink in last place. Gerald was immediately rushed off to be attended to by paramedics with Todd.

=== The Fridge ===
The fridge is a new element to this series where the person who opens it gets an advantage or disadvantage. The biggest losing couple of the week decides whether they would like to open the fridge or choose another team to open the fridge.

Week 2 – Anita & Cher – As the biggest losing couple of the week, Gerald and Todd are given the option to open the fridge; however, they decide to give it to the yellow team and they get the power to have exclusive access to the trainer of their choice until weigh-in; they choose Shannon. This leaves the other eight couples to train with either The Commando or Michelle.

Week 3 - Janet & Kirsten - As the biggest losing couple of the week, Anita and Cher had the power of the fridge this week. Even though they kept on suggesting the black team, they chose the pink team to receive the fridge. In the fridge was an all-access visitors pass. The pink team were told that a special visitor was on their way just for them and the other teams should pull out all the stops as the visitor will fire the pink team up for the rest of the competition. The visitors were Janet's husband Robert and Kirsten's boyfriend Liam in which they participated in a training session with Shannon.

Week 4 – Gerald & Todd - Gerald and Todd were the biggest losing couple of the week for the second time and got power over the fridge, they decided to take a risk and open the fridge themselves, there they received a progress weigh-in where they can weigh-in at any time during the week to see their progress so far. When they weighed in, Gerald lost 1.6 kg while Todd gained 0.7 kg. This had no effect on their status for the actual weigh-in.

Week 5 - Everyone - Despite Gerald and Todd being the biggest losing couple for the third time, no one held the power of the fridge. Instead, Amber opened the fridge to reveal that Temptation would return. This led to Amber and Todd taking temptation and Amber gaining immunity for the week, but angering the other contestants in the house in the process.

Week 6 – Robyn & Katie - As the winners of the weigh-in this week, Robyn & Katie had power over the fridge and they decided to keep it for themselves. As a result, they had the power to send five contestants home for the week - one from each team. They chose Todd, Cher, Amber, Mandy and Robyn. This however did not excuse the contestants from the major challenge, as when they arrived home they each found a letter saying that whoever cycles the furthest in 5 hours would win an advantage in it. The contestants were also allowed to share the load with friends and family.

Week 7 – No one - There was no fridge in Week 7 due to Eliminated Contestants week.

Week 8 - Gerald & Todd - Even though Sam & Jess were the biggest losers of the week, Gerald & Todd were given the power of the fridge for the week as they were leading overall. They decided to open it themselves as Gerald believed he needed a personal booster, and as a result were given full makeovers.

Week 9 - No one - There was no fridge in Week 9 due to Makeover week.

Week 10 - No one - There was no fridge in Week 10 due to Face Your Fears week.

=== Temptation ===
Week 5 - Parents vs Kids - The contestants were split into two teams for the week - Kids versus Parents. For temptation there were two separate rooms; a kids room filled with all their favourite party foods from their childhood, and a parents room filled with gourmet treats and a giant chocolate fountain. Each contestant would spend 5 minutes in their respective rooms alone to eat what they like, with the team consuming the most calories winning immunity. Each contestant had very different views on the morality of temptation leading to heated arguments, particularly between Katie who saw it as cheating and Mark who saw it as a necessary part of the game. In the end only two teams took the temptation - the Green team's Todd and the Light Blue team's Amber, with Amber and Richard winning immunity having eaten the most calories. Katie was angry as she was close to Amber and felt betrayed by her decision.

=== Contest ===
Week 7 - Eliminated Contestants - For the opportunity to return to the competition, three weigh-in passes were up for grabs. With the Black team winning the first pass at the weigh-in for making the most progress since Day 1, the second one was offered to the winner of the Contest. The first round had one member of each team (Cher, Kevin, Sam and Janet) hold a weight with both hands above a yellow tape, arms outstretched. The first to drop their arms and break the yellow tape was out of the Contest, and this was Cher. The second round had the remaining teams choose a representative (Kevin, Jess and Kirsten) to hold a weight on their shoulders with 5 kilograms being added every minute. The first to drop the weight would not go into the final round, and this was Kirsten. The final round had Sam and Rosemary (Red and Blue team) go head to head in an old classic spin bike game to see who could reach 5 km first. Sam won this for the red team, giving him and Jess a weigh-in pass for the week.

=== Eliminations ===
- This year, one member of each couple would cast their votes representing their entire team for who they want to eliminate.
- The eliminated couples were told that they had a chance to re-enter the game at some point, which occurred in week 7.
- In week 3, the trainers were told that they would have to vote a team off; at elimination, the trainers refused to vote so as Rosemary and Kevin had the lowest percentage, they were eliminated.
- In week 6 and week 9 onwards, instead of one person from each safe team voting, both members from the safe teams had to vote.
- In week 7, only one member of the five safe teams were allowed to vote for either the pink or black teams to return to the competition along with the red team.

Contestant	Wk 1	Wk 2	Wk 3	Wk 4	Wk 5	Wk 6	Wk 7	Wk 8	Wk 9	Wk 10
Eliminated	None	Sam Jess	Rosemary Kevin	Janet Kirsten	Chris Mark	Anita Cher	Chris Mark	Sam Jess	Brett Mandy	Janet Kirsten
Robyn	X	Sam & Jess	X	X	X	Anita & Cher	Janet & Kirsten	X	Brett & Mandy	Janet & Kirsten
Katie	X	X	X	X	Chris & Mark	?	X	?	Brett & Mandy	Janet & Kirsten
Gerald	X	Sam & Jess	X	Janet & Kirsten	?	Anita & Cher	Janet & Kirsten	Sam & Jess	Janet & Kirsten	X
Todd	X	X	X	X	X	?	X	X	Janet & Kirsten	X
Richard	X	X	X	Janet & Kirsten	X	Anita & Cher	Janet & Kirsten	X	Brett & Mandy	Gerald & Todd
Amber	X	X	X	X	Chris & Mark	?	X	Sam & Jess	?	Gerald & Todd
Janet	X	X	X	X			X	X	X	X
Kirsten	X	Sam & Jess	X	X			X	Mandy & Brett	X	X
Mandy	X	X	X	Janet & Kirsten	X	X	X	X	X	
Brett	X	Richard & Amber	X	X	Chris & Mark	X	?	X	X	
Sam	X	X					?	X		
Jess	X	X					X	X		
Chris	X	X	X	Robyn & Katie	X		X			
Mark	X	?	X	X	X		X			
Cher	X	Richard & Amber	X	X	X	X				
Anita	X	X	X	Robyn & Katie	X	X				
Rosemary	X	Sam & Jess	X							
Kevin	X	X	X							

Immunity, valid vote cast
X Immunity, not allowed to vote
? Immunity, vote not revealed
X Below yellow line
? Vote not revealed (Hidden vote)
Not allowed to vote
Not in house
Valid vote cast
Winner ($250,000)
