= The Biggest Loser Australia season 10 =

The Biggest Loser Australia
- Season 10
- Starring: Fiona Falkiner (Host); Michelle Bridges; Shannan Ponton; Steve "The Commando" Willis; Tiffiny Hall
- No. of episodes: 39

Release
- Original network: Network Ten
- Original release: 13 September – 8 December 2015

Season chronology
- ← Previous; Season 9 Next → Season 11

The tenth season of the Australian version of the original NBC reality television series The Biggest Loser, known as The Biggest Loser Australia: Families 2 (stylised as TBL Families), premiered on 13 September 2015 and airs at 7.30pm Sundays to Tuesday on Network Ten. Daniel Jofre was crowned Biggest Loser, which saw him awarded $100,000. In addition, the Jofre family received $100,000 for being the family to lose the most weight.

== Host and personalities ==
Personalities
Host	Fiona Falkiner (Former season 1 contestant)
Trainers	Shannan Ponton
Trainers	Michelle Bridges
Trainers	Steve Willis ("The Commando")
Trainers	Tiffiny Hall

== Teams ==
Contestant	Week													
Contestant	1	2	3	4	5	6	7	8	9	10	11	12	13	Finale
Daniel	The Jofres						Black Player						Final 3	The Biggest Loser
Pablo	The Jofres						Black Player						Final 3	Runner-up
Tony	The Jofres						Black Player				Black Player		Final 3	3rd Place
Rob	The Jofres						Black Player							Biggest Loser among Eliminated Contestants
Tenealle	The Auvales						Black Player							Eliminated Contestant
Sam	The Hailwoods										Black Player			Eliminated Contestant
Johnee	The Auvales						Black Player							Eliminated Contestant
Cliff	The Hailwoods						Black Player				Black Player			Eliminated Contestant
Melissa	The Pestells						Black Player				White Player			Eliminated Contestant
Moses	The Auvales						Black Player				White Player			Eliminated Contestant
Jodie	The Pestells						Black Player				White Player			Eliminated Contestant
Sylvia	The Hailwoods										White Player			Eliminated Contestant
Ali	The Pestells										White Player			Eliminated Contestant
Kayla	The Hailwoods										White Player			Eliminated Contestant
Rina	The Auvales										White Player			Eliminated Contestant
Terry	The Pestells										White Player			Eliminated Contestant

== Contestants ==
The following is a list of contestants:

Family	Contestants	Age	Families Team	Status
The Jofres	Daniel	24	Red Team	The Biggest Loser
The Jofres	Pablo	30	Red Team	Runner-up
The Jofres	Tony	27	Red Team	Eliminated (Week 10); Returned (Week 11); 3rd Place
The Jofres	Rob	42	Red Team	Eliminated (Week 12)
The Auvales	Tenealle	26	Black Team	Eliminated (Week 12)
The Hailwoods	Sam	26	White Team	Eliminated (Week 6); Returned (Week 11); Walked (Week 12)
The Auvales	Johnee	38	Black Team	Eliminated (Week 12)
The Hailwoods	Cliff	26	White Team	Eliminated (Week 9); Returned (Week 11); Eliminated (Week 11)
The Pestells	Melissa	31	Blue Team	Eliminated (Week 9)
The Auvales	Moses	39	Black Team	Eliminated (Week 8)
The Pestells	Jodie	30	Blue Team	Eliminated (Week 7)
The Hailwoods	Sylvia	28	White Team	Eliminated (Week 5)
The Pestells	Ali	30	Blue Team	Eliminated (Week 4)
The Hailwoods	Kayla	24	White Team	Eliminated (Week 3)
The Auvales	Rina	37	Black Team	Eliminated (Week 2)
The Pestells	Terry	51	Blue Team	Eliminated (Week 1)

=== Premiere Week ===
For its premiere week, the trainers lived with the contestants, following their diet of poor nutrition, excessive portions and no exercise. They weighed in during the Week 1 episode, gaining 4.5 to 7.6 kg.

== Weigh Ins ==
Color key

Biggest Loser of the week
Immunity for the Weigh-In
Under the Yellow line and up for Elimination
Eliminated Contestant Weigh-In

Under the Red line and automatically Eliminated
LEFT- The contestant left the competition before a weigh-in (via The Game or by choice)
Last person eliminated before finale
The Biggest Loser among eliminated contestants
The Biggest Loser Winner

Contestants	Age	Starting weight	Week												Finale	Weight Lost	Percentage Lost
Contestants	Age	Starting weight	1	2	3	4	5	6	7	8	9	10	11	12	Finale	Weight Lost	Percentage Lost
Daniel	24	132.0	118.5	118.0	112.1	108.3	106.8	102.7	99.8	100.1	96.0	95.6	94.2	90.2	80.4	51.6	39.09%
Pablo	30	158.8	145.2	143.1	138.3	134.7	131.4	129.0	124.4	122.1	119.2	117.9	115.5	111.3	103.9	54.9	34.57%
Tony	27	130.3	117.2	115.6	110.8	108.6	105.8	103.8	98.4	97.4	94.7	95.9	92.4	89.5	87.5	42.8	32.85%
Rob	42	158.6	144.4	141.2	135.3	130.8	127.2	124.1	119.3	117.8	113.1	113.7	112.3	108.0	99.3	59.3	37.39%
Tenealle	26	134.0	125.3	122.8	120.3	118.7	116.8	114.5	111.6	110.6	108.3	107	105.5	102.9	95.9	38.1	28.43%
Sam	26	109.3	105.2	102.3	101.1	99.0	97.9	95.7				90.4	90.2	LEFT	82.7	26.6	24.34%
Johnee	38	215.7	198.3	195.9	191.0	189.0	186.8	180.5	178.9	178.4	174.7	173.7	169.4	LEFT	154.3	61.4	28.47%
Cliff	26	191.0	181.6	176.7	173.1	169.2	167.7	164.2	158.2	157.8	LEFT	155.4	153.6		142.2	48.8	25.55%
Melissa	31	155.6	146.0	143.9	141	139.6	136.9	133.8	132.3	128	125.9	124.8			114	41.6	26.74%
Moses	39	122.0	115.0	112.3	109.3	106.0	103.7	100.0	98.5	99.3		97.3			90.1	31.9	26.15%
Jodie	30	159.0	149.2	145.3	142.7	141.5	138.8	135.0	132.9			128.2			117.3	41.7	26.23%
Sylvia	28	141.7	136.2	132.9	131.7	129.2	127.3					118.4			111	30.7	21.67%
Ali	30	130.2	123.2	120.7	118.9	118.6						105.0			92.9	37.3	28.65%
Kayla	24	110.5	104.7	101.3	100.5							89.3			79.3	31.2	28.24%
Rina	37	155.8	145.3	142.4								132.5			120.3	35.5	22.78%
Terry	51	116.1	108.6									92.6			85.7	30.4	26.18%

=== Notes ===
- Rob said at the beginning of the competition that when he gets to 99 kilos, he's getting married. And that's what happened at finale. He reached 99 kilos then they got married at The Biggest Loser grand finale.
- In the first week, Johnee weighed in and lost 17.4 kilos, the biggest amount of weight lost by an individual in The Biggest Loser Australia.
- Daniel won Biggest Loser of the week six times, more than any other contestant in The Biggest Loser.

== Family Weigh In ==
The family with the most weight percentage lost combined received $100,000

Team	Starting Weight	Finale Weight	Weight Lost	Percentage Lost	Rank
The Jofres	579.7	371.1	-208.6	35.98%	1
The Pestells	560.9	409.9	-151	26.92%	2
The Auvales	627.5	460.6	-166.9	26.60%	3
The Hailwoods	552.5	415.2	-137.3	24.85%	4

== Ratings ==
Colour key:
– Highest rating during the series
– Lowest rating during the series

The Biggest Loser Australia (season 10) overnight ratings, with metropolitan viewership and nightly position
Week	Episode		Original airdate	Timeslot (approx.)	Viewers	Rank (Night)	Source
1	1	"Episode 1"	13 September 2015	Sunday 7:30 pm	646,000	#11	
1	2	"Episode 2"	14 September 2015	Monday 7:30 pm	685,000	#17	
1	3	"Episode 3"	15 September 2015	Tuesday 7:30 pm	726,000	#12	
2	4	"Episode 4"	20 September 2015	Sunday 7:30 pm	543,000	#10	
2	5	"Episode 5"	21 September 2015	Monday 7:30 pm	514,000	—N/a	
2	6	"Episode 6"	22 September 2015	Tuesday 7:30 pm	530,000	#19	
3	7	"Episode 7"	27 September 2015	Sunday 7:30 pm	446,000	#11	
3	8	"Episode 8"	28 September 2015	Monday 7:30 pm	552,000	—N/a	
3	9	"Episode 9"	29 September 2015	Tuesday 7:30 pm	570,000	#17	
4	10	"Episode 10"	4 October 2015	Sunday 7:30 pm	324,000	#17	
4	11	"Episode 11"	5 October 2015	Monday 7:30 pm	531,000	—N/a	
4	12	"Episode 12"	6 October 2015	Tuesday 7:30 pm	581,000	#17	
5	13	"Episode 13"	11 October 2015	Sunday 7:30 pm	576,000	#15	
5	14	"Episode 14"	12 October 2015	Monday 7:30 pm	523,000	—N/a	
5	15	"Episode 15"	13 October 2015	Tuesday 7:30 pm	527,000	#19	
6	16	"Episode 16"	18 October 2015	Sunday 7:30 pm	536,000	#10	
6	17	"Episode 17"	19 October 2015	Monday 7:30 pm	499,000	—N/a	
6	18	"Episode 18"	20 October 2015	Tuesday 7:30 pm	486,000	—N/a	
7	19	"Episode 19"	25 October 2015	Sunday 7:30 pm	598,000	#8	
7	20	"Episode 20"	26 October 2015	Monday 7:30 pm	607,000	#17	
7	21	"Episode 21"	27 October 2015	Tuesday 7:30 pm	628,000	#14	
8	22	"Episode 22"	1 November 2015	Sunday 7:30 pm	576,000	#8	
8	23	"Episode 23"	2 November 2015	Monday 7:30 pm	589,000	#17	
8	24	"Episode 24"	3 November 2015	Tuesday 7:30 pm	537,000	—N/a	
9	25	"Episode 25"	8 November 2015	Sunday 7:30 pm	557,000	#12	
9	26	"Episode 26"	9 November 2015	Monday 7:30 pm	563,000	#19	
9	27	"Episode 27"	10 November 2015	Tuesday 7:30 pm	555,000	#18	
10	28	"Episode 28"	15 November 2015	Sunday 7:30 pm	675,000	#12	
10	29	"Episode 29"	16 November 2015	Monday 7:30 pm	732,000	#12	
10	30	"Episode 30"	17 November 2015	Tuesday 7:30 pm	814,000	#8	
11	31	"Episode 31"	22 November 2015	Sunday 7:30 pm	623,000	#10	
11	32	"Episode 32"	23 November 2015	Monday 7:30 pm	627,000	#17	
11	33	"Episode 33"	24 November 2015	Tuesday 7:30 pm	583,000	#16	
12	34	"Episode 34"	29 November 2015	Sunday 7:30 pm	643,000	#10	
12	35	"Episode 35"	30 November 2015	Monday 7:30 pm	653,000	#11	
12	36	"Episode 36"	1 December 2015	Tuesday 7:30 pm	628,000	#11	
13	37	"Episode 37"	6 December 2015	Sunday 7:30 pm	648,000	#7	
13	38	"Episode 38"	7 December 2015	Monday 7:30 pm	726,000	#10	
13	39	"Grand Finale"	8 December 2015	Tuesday 7:30 pm	911,000	#6	
13	39	"Winner Announced"	8 December 2015	Tuesday 7:30 pm	1,034,000	#1	
