= The Biggest Loser Australia season 9 =

The Biggest Loser Australia
- Season 9
- Starring: Michelle Bridges; Shannan Ponton; Steve Willis (The Commando)
- No. of episodes: 33 (as of 13 April 2014)

Release
- Original network: Network Ten
- Original release: 19 January – 13 April 2014

Season chronology
- ← Previous; Season 8 Next → Season 10

The ninth season of the Australian version of the original NBC reality television series The Biggest Loser, known as The Biggest Loser Australia: Challenge Australia, premiered on 19 January 2014 on Network Ten. This season saw the trainers head to Ararat, Victoria, which at the time of filming was Victoria's fattest town in order to change the lifestyles of its residents before bringing a select few residents back to the Biggest Loser House to compete for the title and prize money.

Season 9 was won by Craig Booby.

== Host and personalities ==
Host: Hayley Lewis has returned for her fifth season as host. She will surpass original host Ajay Rochester to become the show's longest serving host.

Trainers: Shannan Ponton, Michelle Bridges and Steve Willis (The Commando)

== Weigh-ins ==
Contestant	Age	Starting weight	Week											Finale	Weight lost	Percentage lost
Contestant	Age	Starting weight	1	2	3	4	5	6	7		8	9	10	Finale	Weight lost	Percentage lost
Craig	34	183.4	170.0	165.6	161.2	156.4	154.5	152.8	X	147.4	140.6	137.0	132.5	103.3	79.8	43.51%
Toni	48	124.2	114.7	111.7	109.8	107.1	104.9	102.8	X	100.5	97.3	95.1	92.4	76.5	47.7	38.41%
Sharon	31	109.8	101.1	99.3	97.8	95.6	93.4	90.4	X	88.4	86.2	84.6	81.8	69.6	40.2	36.61%
Katrina	45	131.1	124.5	123.5	120.2	117.1	114.3	112.7	X	110.6	107.9	106.2	104.2	87.3	43.8	33.41%
Kerry	49	141.6	129.1	124.6	122.0	118.8	115.4	112.1	X	108.9	107.5	105.6	104.9	95.6	46.0	32.49%
Jane	42	121.7	111.1	109.4	107.0	106.1	104.6	104.0	X	98.3	96.7	95.0		80.3	41.4	34.02%
Kevin	27	185.9			180.6	177.2	173.3	173.9	X	170.0	167.0	Out		152.5	33.4	17.97%
Caitlin	17	134.4	124.9	122.2	118.6	116.8	113.7		113.7	110.5	106.8	Out		97.5	36.9	27.46%
Rodger	51	125.6	119.7						110.2	106.3	105.2			99.4	26.2	20.86%
Cal	34	131.6	122.1	120.8	117.4	114.5	109.9	111.2	110.5	108.3				98.4	33.2	25.23%
Mary	48	181.5	170.4	168.1	164.9				159.3	157.3				139.8	41.7	22.98%
Shannon	36	97.2	91.0	89.1	87.7	86.0	Left							69.9	27.3	28.09%
Natalie	38	117.6	111.6	109.1	105.9	105.0			102.7					92.3	25.3	21.51%
Matt	37	122.8	113.7	112.3	Out				107.3					99.9	22.9	18.65%
Cameron	34	146.4	131.4	127.9										86.2	60.2	41.12%

Notes

Standings
Week's Biggest Loser
Immunity
Immunity & Biggest Loser
Under Yellow Line
In Competition
Eliminated Contestant Weigh-In
Automatic Elimination
Left before weigh-in (Choice, Challenge, The Fridge or Expulsion)
Won Weigh-in pass based on Weigh-in or competition (for previously eliminated contestants)
(Last person eliminated before finale)
Winner (among finalist)
Winner (among eliminated)
Contestant returned to the competition

Teams
Commando's Team
Shannan's Team
Michelle's Team

=== Major Challenges ===
- Week 1 - The Punisher - After the 14 Ararat champions arrived in Sydney, they met Hayley outside the Sydney Opera House for a pre-housewarming challenge. The contestants were put into pairs and had to run the 72 steps down and up the Opera House till they pass over 10,000 steps. There was no reward for the challenge but were told that the two pairs that came in last would be up for elimination that night and one pair will be eliminated. The teams were: Orange - Shannon and Jane, Red - Cameron & Katrina, Pink - Cal & Mary, Light blue - Matt & Caitlin, Green - Rodger and Sharon, Yellow - Kerry & Toni and Blue - Natalie & Craig. Cal took an early lead to give Mary a head start, followed by green. The orange team struggled from the start with Shannon calling herself 'useless'. After a quarter of the way in, the red team had taken the lead. After Mary started to struggle Cal had to take the slack to keep the team safe which he begrudgingly did. Natalie collapsed needing medical attention but soon recovered and continued. The red team won the challenge followed by green, yellow, pink and blue. The Light Blue (who fell behind due to sickness and Caitlin collapsing) and Orange teams came in last and were up for elimination that night.
- Week 1 - Chains Of Pain - The teams arrived at the beach for their first team challenge. In this challenge, the teams had to cover a 350m stretch of sand, completing 4 obstacles including climbing over blockades and digging and crawling under poles in the sand then race back to the finish line. They had to do this whilst be connected with 21m of chain weighing 75kg each. After every 2 obstacles, the teams must attach another chain to their links. Following the quarry challenge in Ararat, the black team won an advantage which was that they only had to put on one additional chain and not 2. The winning team would win a 2kg advantage at the weigh-in. Whilst the black team took a strong mindset, Mary already doubted herself. The blue team took an early lead after the first obstacle, giving them hope as Craig struggled to get through the first obstacle. As the black team were starting to catch up at obstacle 3, Mary was already giving up and collapsed. The black team overtook and won the challenge.
- Week 2 - Container Push - The teams arrived at a shipping yard for the challenge. Teams had to push their team container to the bottom of a container stack. Then inside their container was 3.4 tonnes of haybales which they need to use to build a staircase to the top. The first team to get to the top wins the prize in the mystery container. Due to medical reasons, Cameron and Shannon had to sit out. As the biggest loser of the week, Cameron got to decide which four members of the black team would take part to even up the teams. He chose Cal, Kerry and Jane to sit out. Hayley also let the trainers compete with their teams. The black team took an early lead by spacing their logs further apart and even though they struggled with a rouge log, they still reached the container stack first. From then on, the trainers were taken out. The blue team caught up with Mary stepping up through the pain whilst the Black team started to break down due to broken haybales and lack to motivation with the ladies not happy with Cal's 'abusive' words. This led to the blue team to take over the lead but then realized that they need more bales and needed to go back giving the black team hope but it wasn't enough to catch up and the blue team won their first challenge. When the Mystery container was opened, Kevin from Season 8 was inside. It was announced that Kevin would join the competition as he came back to finish what he started. As the blue team won, Kevin would join the Blue team officially after the next weigh-in.
- Week 3 - Dread Over Heels - The teams arrived at the YMCA of the University of New South Wales fitness & aquatic center. The challenge saw each contestant get on a treadmill starting at 3kn/h and an incline of 3. At intervals marked by Hayley, the contestants must increase their speed. If they fall into the water behind them, they are out. The last individual standing would win the second immunity of the week and a 2kg advantage for their team at the weigh-in . After the haybale town challenge in Ararat, the blue team won an advantage in this challenge but as it is double trouble week, the advantage was doubled: 1. The blue team starting 10 minutes after the black team. 2. The blue team got to choose who would sit out on the black team, Toni automatically sat out as she had immunity from the fridge at the start of the week. The blue team chose Cal to sit out. Before the challenge starts, Natalie chooses to sit out as she felt sick with a stomach bug. After 45 minutes, Mary was the first to drop out. After the hour mark, Kevin was the next to drop. Caitlin was 3rd to drop at 1hr 15 minutes followed quickly by Shannon, leaving Katrina the last blue standing. After 90 minutes, Craig fell followed soon by Sharon who had been struggling throughout the challenge. After 105 minutes, Katrina fell which gave the Black team the 2kg advantage. Kerry was the last one standing gaining immunity alongside his wife.
- Week 4 - Stacks On - Each team had to pick two women and one man to be the strength on each team. The remaining team members had to decide whom on the other team would receive 10kg stacked on to their bars. The last one standing would win letters from home for their team. As the black team won the last weigh-in, they got to choose who to get weight first. Cal and Craig were the instant targets for their teams. Cal was the first to drop at 80kg. At 50kg, Natalie went next leaving Katrina again as the last blue standing. At 100kg, Craig tapped out next leaving only the women left. Although the blue team were stacking on Sharon, Caitlin dropped at 40kg. Katrina won the challenge at 120kg, creating a new biggest loser record for a female in a stacks on challenge. Katrina won the power to give the Black team their letters from home as well which she accepted. The blue team were told as part of rewards week that until weigh-in, they will go on a luxury trip to the Hunter Valley.
- Week 5 - A 'Tyre'some challenge - Each team had a cage attached to a car. The car will move slowly down a 600m stretch of road. The teams had to carry the tires, using some basic tools, and put them in their respective cages. The team with the most tyres in their cage when the car reaches the finish line would win. The losing team would get a 2g penalty at the weigh-in. Following the Tractor pull ralay race in Ararat, the blue team got an advantage of 15 tyres already in their cage. The black team chose Sharon and Toni to sit out to even team numbers. The black team quickly caught up to the advantage the blue team had. As the challenge went on, Cal continually got wound up and caused tension in the team. After 400m, the black team started to struggle and kept missing the cage which allowed the blue team to start to catch up and Kevin being the power of their team. After a recount, the end score came down to 1 tyre (126-125) with the black team scrapping out the victory.
