= The Biggest Loser (Australian TV series) =

Reality competition series

- Genre: Reality television
- Based on: The Biggest Loser
- Directed by: Ian Stevenson (2006)
- Presented by: Ajay Rochester (2006–09); Hayley Lewis (2010–14); Fiona Falkiner (2015, 2017)
- Starring: Jillian Michaels (2006–08); Bob Harper (2006–08); Michelle Bridges (2007–15); Shannan Ponton (2007–17); Steve Willis (2007–15); Emma "Emazon" Hutton (2009); Tiffiny Hall (2011–12, 2015); Libby Babet (2017)
- Opening theme: "Lift" by Shannon Noll (Seasons 1–5); "We Are Family" by Sister Sledge (Season 6); "You Got the Love" by Florence and the Machine (Season 7); "Time After Time" by Cyndi Lauper (Season 8)
- Country of origin: Australia
- Original language: English
- No. of seasons: 10
- No. of episodes: 569 (list of episodes)

Production
- Executive producers: Tara McWilliams (Season 6); Dave Broome
- Producers: Tim Thatcher (Challenge Producer – Series 6); Amanda Scott
- Production locations: Sydney; White House Biggest Loser (season 1–3); Fizroy Island (season 4); Camp Biggest loser (season 4–7); The Biggest Loser House (Season 8–11)
- Running time: 30 mins (Monday, Wednesday, Friday); 60 mins (Sunday, Tuesday, Thursday, special shows, Monday to Thursday) (inc. commercials)
- Production companies: Crackerjack Productions (2006); FremantleMedia Australia (2006–10); Shine Australia (2011–2017)

Original release
- Network: Network Ten
- Release: 13 February 2006 – 11 May 2017

Related
- The Biggest Loser

The Biggest Loser is an Australian reality television show, based on the original American version of the same name. It is produced by Shine Australia and screened on Network Ten. Since 2015, the show has been hosted by former contestant Fiona Falkiner, it was formerly hosted by Ajay Rochester from 2006 to 2009 & former Olympian Hayley Lewis from 2010 to 2014. The show debuted on 13 February 2006, followed by a second season on 4 February 2007 which introduced Michelle Bridges, Shannan Ponton and Steve Willis. The third season began airing on 3 February 2008. A fourth season, which features couples competing as teams, started airing on 1 February 2009. A fifth season, which aired on 31 January 2010, featuring former Olympic swimmer Hayley Lewis as the new host, and in 2011 the show introduced the new trainer Tiffiny Hall. In its eleventh season, the show introduced new trainer Libby Babet. The show did not return in 2018 due to low ratings.

== About the series ==
The series involves contestants who are overweight to varying degrees participating in a contest to lose the most percentage of weight, with teams and contestants voting out each other. Unlike the American version, weight loss is measured in tenths of kilograms instead of pounds.

Personal trainers Michelle Bridges, Shannan Ponton, Steve Willis and Tiffiny Hall are responsible for training the contestants and helping them to lose weight. Michelle and Shannan have been the main trainers since Season 2 (in Season 1 the original American trainers Bob Harper and Jillian Michaels were used, and in Seasons 2 and 3 they appeared as guests).

Seasons one to three of the show were filmed in Terrey Hills, one of the northern suburbs of Sydney. The Walk was filmed at Bobbin Head in Ku-ring-gai Chase National Park, Turramurra, New South Wales.

Season 4 began filming at Fitzroy Island in Far North Queensland, before moving to North Head, Sydney.

== Series overview ==
Season	Title	Episodes	Originally aired		Prize
Season	Title	Episodes	Premiere	Finale	Prize
1	TBL	53	13 February 2006	27 April 2006	$200,000
2	TBL 2	68	4 February 2007	26 April 2007	$200,000
3	TBL 3	74	3 February 2008	1 May 2008	$200,000
4	Couples	75	1 February 2009	27 April 2009	$200,000
5	Couples 2	67	31 January 2010	18 April 2010	$400,000
6	Families	53	30 January 2011	2 May 2011	$100,000 (single contestant) $100,000 (biggest percentage weight loss family)
7	Singles	72	23 January 2012	8 May 2012	$220,000
8	The Next Generation	34	17 March 2013	28 May 2013	$200,000
9	Challenge Australia	34	19 January 2014	13 April 2014	$75,000
10	Families 2	39	13 September 2015	8 December 2015	$100,000 (single contestant) $100,000 (biggest percentage weight loss family)
11	Transformed	28	14 March 2017	1 May 2017	$50,000 (Most weightloss) $100,000 (Viewers vote)

=== Winners ===
Season	Contestant	Age	Starting Weight (kg)	Finale Weight (kg)	Total Weight Loss (kg)	Percentage Loss
1	Adriano "Adro" Sarnelli	26	136.5	85.2	51.3	37.58%
2	Chris Garling	23	149.5	79.4	70.1	46.89%
3	Sam Rouen	19	154.6	82.9	71.7	46.48%
4	Bob Herdsman	57	167.8	80.2	87.6	52.21%
5	Lisa Hose	41	121.9	65.7	56.2	46.10%
6	Emma Duncan	25	133.9	71.8	62.1	46.38%
6	The Westren Family	23–53	470.6	277.2	193.4	41.10%
7	Margie Cummins	34	159.1	85.9	73.2	46.01%
8	Robyn Dyke	45	112.1	73.1	39.0	34.88%
8	Katie Dyke	19	136.8	89.2	47.6	34.80%
9	Craig Booby	34	183.4	103.3	79.8	43.51%
10	Daniel Jofre	24	132.0	80.4	51.6	39.09%
10	The Jofre Family	24–42	579.7	371.1	208.6	35.95%
11	Brett Smith	40	116.8	82.5	34.3	29.36%
11	Lynton Della Rosa	27	124.2	81.2	43.0	34.82%

== Hosts and Trainers ==
Timeline of hosts, trainers and other personnel
Starring	Seasons										
Starring	1	2	3	4	5	6	7	8	9	10	11
Ajay Rochester	Host	Host	Host	Host							
Hayley Lewis					Host	Host	Host	Host	Host		
Fiona Falkiner										Host	Host
Jillian Michaels	Trainer	Trainer	Trainer								
Bob Harper	Trainer	Trainer	Trainer								
Michelle Bridges		Trainer	Trainer	Trainer	Trainer	Trainer	Trainer	Trainer	Trainer	Trainer	
Steve Willis		Trainer	Trainer	Trainer	Trainer	Trainer	Trainer	Trainer	Trainer	Trainer	
Shannan Ponton		Trainer	Trainer	Trainer	Trainer	Trainer	Trainer	Trainer	Trainer	Trainer	Trainer
Emma "Emazon" Hutton				Trainer							
Tiffiny Hall						Trainer	Trainer			Trainer	
Libby Babet											Trainer

== Season guide ==
=== Season 1 (2006) ===
This is an Australian version of the program first aired at 7.00 pm each weeknight on Network Ten from 13 February to the final episode on 27 April 2006 where the first Australia's Biggest Loser was awarded A$200,000. The program, directed by Ian Stevenson, featured the same personal trainers as the American version, Bob Harper and Jillian Michaels with Australian host Ajay Rochester. Over 6,000 Australians applied to take part, only 12 contestants being chosen to compete, their starting weight ranging from 101 kg (Fiona) to 196 kg (David).

=== Season 2 (2007) ===
The second season of the Australian version first went to air on Sunday 4 February 2007 on the Ten Network, the eventual winner being Chris Garling who lost 70.1 kg and won A$200,000. It was introduced with personal trainers Bob Harper and Jillian Michaels, who were then taken over by two new Australian trainers, Michelle Bridges and Shannan Ponton, with one extra surprise trainer, "Commando" Steve Willis. The contestants starting weights range from 108 kg (Mel) to 216 kg (Damien). The beginning of this series marked some controversy with a contestant quitting, two leaving on medical terms and the introduction of "The Walk" which gave individual immunity winners unprecedented power as to how the game is played. The latest twist in the game was revealed on 21 March 2007, where it was revealed to the competitors and viewers that there was a secret weigh-in involving two "outsiders" on the first day. These outsiders (Chris and Kimberlie) had trained daily with the "Commando" while still living at home and going about their everyday lives. Their entry into the house caused some upset, especially with newcomer Chris recording a big enough weight loss to see him enter the competition as the 3rd biggest loser and eventually going on to become the season's winner.

=== Season 3 (2008) ===
The third season premiered on 3 February 2008 in a similar format as the previous two seasons, with the winner receiving A$200,000. The three Australian trainers from previous seasons return in addition to Bob Harper and Jillian Michaels, who trained a rival team in the United States. The starting weights ranged from 111 kg (Carrianne) to 206 kg (Garry).

Applications for the third season opened at the end of season 2.

On 1 May, university student Sam Rouen became the show's youngest Biggest Loser.

=== Season 4 (2009) ===
On 24 June 2008, it was announced on the official website that there would be a fourth season of the show, The Biggest Loser Australia: Couples.

After complaints from neighbours "The Biggest Loser" was kicked out of the house known as the White House in Duffy's Forest, near Mona Vale. Neighbours complained to the council of smells coming from the property, even though they only use the property for around 4 months.

Filming for Season 4 of The Biggest Loser Australia took place on Fitzroy Island off the coast of Far North Queensland and in Sydney.

The fourth season premiered on 1 February 2009. It featured ten couples who all have some kind of relationship and are overweight, their weights ranged from 102 kg (Mel) to 178 kg (Sharif). Each couple competed against the other couples, temporarily replacing the regular format of two teams of individuals.

On 27 April, Bob Herdsman, at 57 years old, with a record weight loss of 87.6 kilograms (52.2%), became the show's oldest Biggest Loser.

On 16 May it was revealed that the 2009 season of the Biggest Loser was the last to feature host Ajay Rochester.

=== Season 5 (2010) ===
Biggest Loser Season 5 was the second series to feature couples. Applications opened after the fourth season aired, and filming started at its regular time in mid-January. Hayley Lewis hosted season 5, replacing Ajay Rochester. Trainers Michelle Bridges, Shannan Ponton and Steve Willis returned for this season. Season 5 began on Sunday 31 January 2010 at 6:30 pm on Ten.

Deryck James Ward and his sister left the show under a cloud when he was charged with child pornography offences. All references to the couple were hastily edited out before the show aired. Ward was subsequently jailed for two years.

The original grand prize amount was $200,000, with the possibility of being doubled to $400,000 by the Double bracelet. However, Chris Galea took $15,000 out of the grand prize amount by leaving the game during Temptation in Week 6.

On 18 April 2010, Lisa Hose was crowned with The Biggest Loser 2010. Earning the grand prize of $185,000, but due to the double bracelet she was wearing, this prize money increased to $370,000. She is also the first female winner of The Biggest Loser.

=== Season 6 (2011) ===
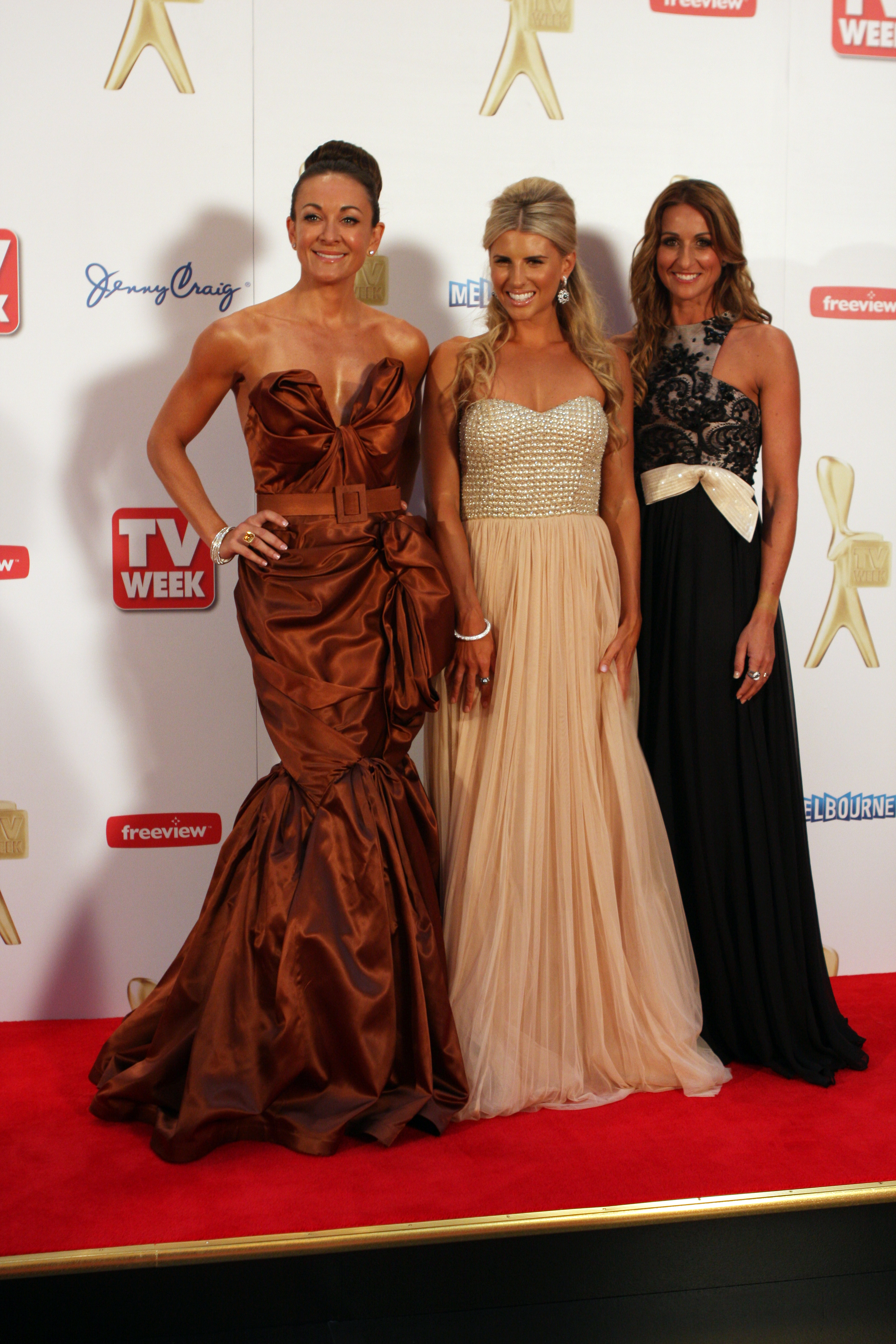
L to R:Michelle Bridges, Tiffiny Hall and Hayley Lewis (2011)

The sixth season of the series, The Biggest Loser Australia: Families, began airing on 30 January 2011. Host Hayley Lewis announced during the Series 5 finale that they were taking applications for the sixth season of the series and that it would be family contestants, Teams of four family members compete for the title of the Biggest Loser in this round. The teams are the Westrens, the Challenors, the Duncans and the Moons. Emma Duncan was crowned the Biggest Loser 2011, with a total weight loss of 62.1 kg (46.38%). Sharlene Westren took The Eliminated Contestants prize of $20,000. The Westren Family won the title of the Biggest Losing Family. Emma and the Westrens won $100,000.

=== Season 7 (2012) ===
The seventh season of the series, The Biggest Loser Australia: Singles, began airing on 23 January 2012. During Network Ten's 2012 Programming Launch on 17 August 2011; it was revealed that the show would be reverting to its original singles format.

The show premiered to rather soft numbers receiving 897,000. However the show was put up against The Big Bang Theory and the Australian Open.

The series was won by Margie Cummins who lost 73.2 kg a total percentage of 46.01% winning $220,000. The original prize pool was $250,000, but $30,000 of this was taken by James Moore in Week 2 by leaving the game during Temptation. Lydia Hantke took home the eliminated contestants prize of $20,000.

=== Season 8 (2013) ===
Ten confirmed during August 2012 that The Biggest Loser Australia would return for an eighth season in 2013. Dubbed "The Next Generation", every team will be made up of a parent-child team. Tiffiny Hall is the only trainer not returning. The 2013 season premiered on 17 March and was shown every Sunday, Monday and Tuesday. This season has introduced the heaviest contestant on The Biggest Loser worldwide, Kevin Moore. Kevin weighs 255 kg (562 lbs).

The show was won by Robyn and Katie Dyke.

=== Season 9 (2014) ===
It was confirmed during the season eight finale that The Biggest Loser would return for a ninth season titled The Biggest Loser: Challenge Australia. The 2014 season started on 19 January. The show was won by Craig Booby.

=== Season 10 (2015) ===
In April 2015, it was confirmed that The Biggest Loser would return in late 2015, with season 10 to be titled TBL Families, with former contestant Fiona Falkiner taking over as host from Hayley Lewis. In addition, Bridges, Ponton, Willis and Hall were announced to all return as trainers. The season premiered on 13 September 2015. Daniel Jofre was crowned Biggest Loser, which saw him awarded $100,000, In addition, the Jofre family received $100,000 for being the family to lose the most weight.

=== Season 11 (2017) ===
The season, titled "The Biggest Loser: Transformed", premiered on 14 March 2017, Shannon Ponton returned as a trainer, along with new trainer Libby Babet, with previous trainers Michelle Bridges, Steve "Commando" Willis, and Tiffany Hall not returning. Fiona Falkiner returned as the host.

== Music ==
- The music used in the second season's promotional advertising is an original score from Downright Music, Session 5 – Premiere Song Sampler called 'A long way to go'
- The music used in the third season's promotional cinema, TV and radio advertising is Everybody's Gotta Learn Sometime by Robyn Loau.
- The music used in the fourth season's promotional advertising is 'Fighter' by Christina Aguilera.
- The music used in the promotional advertising and the opening and end credits for the first five seasons of the show is 'Lift' by Shannon Noll.
- The music used in the eighth season's promotional advertising is 'Try' by Pink.
- The music used in the ninth season's promotional advertising is 'Roar' by Katy Perry.

=== Soundtrack ===
The Official soundtrack for the TV series was released on 17 March 2007 featuring various artists such as Kelly Clarkson, Fatboy Slim, The Black Eyed Peas, and Shakira.

Track listing

1. Shannon Noll – Lift
2. The Black Eyed Peas – Pump It
3. Rogue Traders – Way To Go!
4. Kelly Clarkson – Walk Away
5. BodyRockers – I Like the Way (You Move) (radio Edit)
6. Britney Spears – Do Somethin'
7. Pink – U + Ur Hand (clean)
8. Charlotte Church – Crazy Chick
9. The Killers – Somebody Told Me
10. Gretchen Wilson – Redneck Woman
11. Groove Armada – I See You Baby
12. Pussycat Dolls – Don't Cha
13. Shakira – Hips Don't Lie (featuring Wyclef Jean)
14. Anastacia – Sick & Tired (jason Nevins Electrochill Remix Edit)
15. INXS – Pretty Vegas
16. Will Smith – Switch
17. Fergie – London Bridge
18. Planet Funk – The Switch
19. Fatboy Slim – The Rockafeller Skank
20. Christina Aguilera – Fighter
21. Sister Sledge – We are Family (opening credits)

== Book ==
The Biggest Loser: Change Your Life is a paperback book published by Hardie Grant Trade on 1 March 2007 and offers exercises, healthy diets and eating plans based on those used by the contestants. The book also includes motivational advice from the second season trainers, Shannon Ponton and Michelle Bridges, and suggestions from former season one contestants.

The book has three chapters: Ready, gives a summary of exercises and diets. Set, has over 60 healthy recipes and further detail about exercises. Go . The exercise plans covered include a two-week "KickStart Plan" and a three-month "LifeStyle Program" .

- ISBN 1740 665 007
- ISBN 9781 740 665 001

== See also ==
- List of The Biggest Loser Australia episodes
- List of Australian television series
- Excess Baggage
- BIG – Extreme Makeover
