= The Biggest Loser Australia season 1 =

Season of television series

The Biggest Loser Australia
- Season 1
- Starring: Jillian Michaels; Bob Harper; Adro Sernalli (Winner)
- Presented by: Ajay Rochester
- No. of episodes: 53

Release
- Original network: Network Ten
- Original release: 13 February – 27 April 2006

Season chronology
- Next → Season 2

The first season of the Australian version of the original NBC American reality television series The Biggest Loser premiered at 7pm each week night on Network Ten for 10 weeks from 13 February to 27 April 2006. The eventual winner, as decided by percentage of weight lost, was Adriano "Adro" Sarnelli, who won A$200,000. The host was announced as Ajay Rochester, who had previously gone through weight loss herself. American trainers Bob Harper and Jillian Michaels reprised their roles from the previous American version. Applications closed on 11 November 2005 with over 6,000 Australians having applied to take part. The finale was watched by 2.310 million Australian viewers.

At the beginning of the season, all contestants were given one 'last meal' of their favourite meals such as steak, spaghetti, chocolates, lasagna, lollies, alcohol, and other items.

== Season overview ==
=== Game variations ===
- Final 4 at finale: Adro was invited back in a rather odd twist that was seemingly forced into the show after Bob and Jillian complained that it was "unfair" for Adro to be knocked out by Harry, because Harry was allowed to take vitamins in the time that he was out of the house while the contestants inside the house were not allowed to take vitamins. Host Ajay Rochester later revealed that Adro threatened to sue the producers after he was eliminated, so they rewrote him back into the show.
- Returning contestants: All contestants previously voted out were given the chance to compete against each other to be returned into the game. Tracy declined the opportunity to return and Wal gained weight meaning he had to leave the competition. Harry made the final spot and in turn knocked Adro out of the game with a vote from Kristie and Harry.
- Super Challenge: The several eliminated contestants returned to the show to compete in a "Super Challenge" in which they trekked through 3 km of sand dunes to then make a choice of meals from a table of varied calorie meals. The contestant to choose the lowest three calorie meals would have a chance to be in the final 4. Harry completed the Super Challenge first, and chose the meal second lowest in calories (canned Roma Tomatoes). Jo was second to complete the challenge and chose the lowest calorie meal (Ribena Light), and although coming in last place, Cat chose the third lowest calorie meal (Tuna in Oil). A weigh in decided who was a part of the final 4; Cat lost 0.9 kg, Jo lost 2 kg, Harry lost 10.7 kg which was enough to award his place in the final
- Teams: Contestants were initially divided into two teams of red and blue by their trainers Bob Harper and Jillian Michaels. The red team consisted of Adro, David, Jo, Kristie, Shane and Ruth and the blue team consisted of Cat, Artie, Harry, Fiona, Tracy and Wal.
- Pairs: When only eight contestants remained, they were broken into pairs. Wal won the power to decide who would be paired together, which were Artie and Tracy, Fiona and Shane, Adro and Ruth, Wal and Kristie. After one week of pairs, contestants competed individually.
- Final four: The final four contestants were Kristie, Fiona, Harry and Adro

=== Game elements ===
==== The Weigh-Ins ====
The following is a list of contestants and their weekly weight losses.

| Contestant | Age | Height | Starting BMI | Current BMI | Starting weight | Week | | | | | | | | | | Finale | Weight lost | Percentage lost |
| Contestant | Age | Height | Starting BMI | Current BMI | Starting weight | 1 | 2 | 3 | 4 | 5 | 6 | 7 | 8 | | 9 | Finale | Weight lost | Percentage lost |
|---|---|---|---|---|---|---|---|---|---|---|---|---|---|---|---|---|---|---|
| Adro | 26 | 174 | 44.5 | 27.8 | 136.5 | 128.8 | 126.9 | 124.4 | 122.8 | 122.2 | 114.9 | 112.5 | 108.9 | X | 102.6 | 85.2 | 51.3 | 37.58% |
| Harry | 35 | 190 | 49.2 | 31.0 | 178.9 | 166.7 | 162.6 | 156.8 | 155.5 | | | | | 147.5 | 132.4 | 112.7 | 66.2 | 37.06% |
| Kristie | 32 | 164 | 38.4 | 24.3 | 104.8 | 95.4 | 94.6 | 92.5 | 90.8 | 90.2 | 85.6 | 91.5 | 83.4 | X | 80.5 | 66.1 | 38.7 | 36.80% |
| Fiona | 22 | 175 | 34.9 | 24.7 | 101.1 | 94.8 | 94.9 | 92.9 | 91.5 | 94.4 | 86.6 | 86.3 | 87.1 | X | 81.4 | 71.6 | 29.5 | 29.15% |
| Shane | 38 | 170 | 53.3 | 34.6 | 154.0 | 145.2 | 140.6 | 136.6 | 131.2 | 133.8 | 127.9 | 122.6 | 119.8 | 119.8 | | 100.4 | 53.6 | 35.00% |
| Ruth | 28 | 169 | 53.6 | 45.7 | 155.2 | 150.4 | 147.9 | 144.5 | 141.5 | 140.5 | 137.2 | 135.5 | | 132.3 | | 130.9 | 24.3 | 14.62% |
| Wal | 42 | 196 | 46.2 | 28.8 | 176.7 | 161.2 | 157.5 | 150.6 | 150.1 | 145.3 | 140.1 | | | 140.8 | | 110.4 | 66.3 | 37.52% |
| Artie | 42 | 177 | 49.5 | 36.9 | 156.4 | 147.8 | 144.8 | 142.9 | 140.5 | 138.7 | | | | 132.4 | | 116.4 | 40.0 | 25.51% |
| Tracy | 44 | 175 | 35.7 | 28.1 | 109.8 | 103.6 | 101.8 | 100.1 | 98.6 | 98.1 | | | | X | | 86.0 | 23.8 | 21.49% |
| Cat | 27 | 169 | 54.5 | 36.0 | 157.8 | 151.0 | 146.6 | 144.2 | | | | | | 130.6 | | 104.1 | 53.7 | 33.91% |
| Jo | 33 | 165 | 39.9 | 28.1 | 108.0 | 101.8 | 100.7 | | | | | | | 88.6 | | 76.7 | 31.3 | 28.58% |
| David | 33 | 172 | 66.0 | 49.9 | 196.7 | 189.3 | | | | | | | | 175.1 | | 148.8 | 47.9 | 24.42% |

Contestants

- The week's biggest loser
- Had immunity for the week
- Weigh-in for previously eliminated contestants
- Winner (among finalists)
- Winner (among eliminated)

BMIs

- Healthy Body Mass Index (less than 25.0 BMI)
- Overweight Body Mass Index (25.0–29.9 BMI)
- Obese Class I (30.0–34.9 BMI)
- Obese Class II Index (35.0–39.9 BMI)
- Obese Class III (40.0 or above)

=== Eliminations ===
Each week, after a weigh in, contestants must cast a vote against another contestant and avoid elimination. The contestant that received the most votes left the game immediately. Contestants can avoid elimination by their team or themselves losing the most percentage of weight loss, winning immunity at a temptation challenge. Contestants make themselves an elimination target if they are a threat of losing a lot of weight by the end of the show. Elimination episodes screened on Mondays. Below is a table of voting history for what each contestant voted.

| Week | Wk 1 | Wk 2 | Wk 3 | Wk 4 | Wk 5 | Wk 6 | Wk 7 | Wk 8 | Wk 9 |
| Eliminated | David | Jo | Cat | Harry | Tracy & Artie | Wal | Ruth | Shane | Adro |
|---|---|---|---|---|---|---|---|---|---|
| Adro | Shane | Jo | X | X | X | Wal | Fiona | Shane | X |
| Harry | X | X | Fiona | Tracy | Eliminated Wk 4 | | | | Adro |
| Kristie | David | Jo | X | X | Tracy & Artie | Wal | Ruth | Shane | Adro |
| Fiona | X | X | Cat | Harry | Ruth & Adro | Wal | X | X | X |
| Shane | ? | ? | X | X | Tracy & Artie | ? | Ruth | X | Eliminated Wk 8 |
| Ruth | David | ? | Jo | X | X | X | X | Eliminated Wk 7 | |
| Wal | X | X | X | X | Tracy & Artie | X | Eliminated Wk 6 | | |
| Artie | X | X | Cat | Harry | X | Eliminated Wk 5 | | | |
| Tracy | X | X | Cat | Harry | X | Eliminated Wk 5 | | | |
| Cat | X | X | Fiona | Eliminated Wk 3 | | | | | |
| Jo | David | Adro | Eliminated Wk 2 | | | | | | |
| David | Jo | Eliminated Wk 1 | | | | | | | |

Immunity
X Immunity, unable to vote
X Below yellow line, unable to vote
X Finished last in the elimination challenge, eliminated
X Not in elimination, unable to vote
? Vote not revealed
Eliminated or not in house
Valid vote cast
Elimination notes

- Wal was originally a member of the Blue Team, but moved to the Red Team in week 3 after the minor challenge.
- Harry was originally eliminated in week 4, but won the right to return out of the eliminated contestants in week 9.
- Kristie and Fiona were never eliminated; Kristie was the only player not to receive a vote for elimination.
- Adro was eliminated the week before the finale, but brought back to make a final 4.

==== Finale ====
The finale was broadcast as a live contestant reunion on 27 April 2006, where the remaining four contestants were weighed to determine the first Australian Biggest Loser. Although commenting "I'm gonna win this", and losing 66.2 kg (37% of his body weight since his first weight-in), Harry lost out to Adro's marginally better 37.58%, who in total lost 51.3 kg. Adro had the highest percentage of weight loss, making him Australia's Biggest Loser for 2006 and the winner of A$200,000. For Harry's efforts, he won $30,000. Third place went to Kristie, who lost 38.7 kg (36.93% - only 0.07% below Harry and within a percent Adro). She won a total of A$20,000. Coming in fourth was the lightest and youngest contestant, Fiona, who lost 29.5 kg (29.18%) and won A$10,000.

At the end of the show, Adro could only manage to yell, "this is unreal", as the stage was invaded by loved ones and eliminated contestants. As Wal shouted 'Young Bull' at the top of his voice and the crowd cheered. On the Sunday night following the finale, 30 April 2006, a special episode of the show aired to reveal Secrets of The Biggest Loser which includes all the diet and nutrition tips which were used as part of the show as well as a behind the scene look at the show itself.

All previously eliminated contestants were also weighed for the chance of the runners-up prize of A$50,000. Wal lost 66.3 kg (37.52%) of his original weight, making him the biggest loser of those eliminated. The remaining contestants achieved the following results:

Final 4

| Contestant | Start Weight (kg) | Finale Weight (kg) | Total loss (kg/%) | Notes |
|---|---|---|---|---|
| ADRO | 136.5 | 85.2 | 51.3 (37.58%) | 1st place, won A$200,000 |
| HARRY | 178.9 | 112.7 | 66.2 (37.00%) | 2nd place, won A$30,000 |
| KRISTIE | 104.8 | 66.1 | 38.7 (36.93%) | 3rd place, won A$20,000 |
| FIONA | 101.1 | 71.6 | 29.5 (29.18%) | 4th place, won A$10,000 |

Eliminated contestants

| Contestant | Start Weight (kg) | Finale Weight (kg) | Total loss (kg/%) |
|---|---|---|---|
| WAL | 176.7 | 110.4 | 66.3 (37.52%) |
| SHANE | 154.0 | 100.4 | 53.6 (34.81%) |
| CAT | 157.8 | 104.1 | 53.7 (34.03%) |
| JO | 108.0 | 76.7 | 31.3 (28.98%) |
| ARTIE | 156.4 | 116.4 | 40.0 (25.58%) |
| DAVID | 196.7 | 148.8 | 47.9 (24.35%) |
| TRACY | 109.8 | 86.0 | 23.8 (21.68%) |
| RUTH | 155.2 | 130.9 | 24.3 (15.66%) |

== Contestants ==
(In Order of Elimination)

| Contestant | Age | Hometown | Occupation | Team | Status |
|---|---|---|---|---|---|
| David Hilyander | 33 | Sydney, New South Wales | Graphic Designer | Red Team | Eliminated Week 1 |
| Jo Cowling | 33 | Sydney, New South Wales | Real Estate Agent | Red Team | Eliminated Week 2 |
| Catherine "Cat" White | 27 | Melbourne, Victoria | Builder's Quoter | Blue Team | Eliminated Week 3 |
| Tracy Moores | 44 | Sydney, New South Wales | Plus Size Model | Blue Team | Eliminated Week 5 |
| Arthur "Artie" Rocke | 42 | Hervey Bay, Queensland | Kitchen Assistant | Blue Team | Eliminated Week 5 |
| Vladimir "Wal" Milberg | 42 | Townsville, Queensland | Firefighter | Red Team | Eliminated Week 6 Runners-up Prize Winner ($50,000) |
| Ruth Almeida de Campos | 28 | Newcastle, New South Wales | Mother of three | Red Team | Eliminated Week 7 |
| Shane Giles | 35 | Ballarat, Victoria | Geologist | Red Team | Eliminated Week 8 |
| Fiona Falkiner | 23 | Geelong, Victoria | University Student | Blue Team | 4th Place ($10,000) |
| Kristie Dignam | 33 | Perth, Western Australia | Mother of five | Red Team | 3rd Place ($20,000) |
| Harry Kantzidis | 38 | Melbourne, Victoria | Plumber | Blue Team | Eliminated Week 4 Returned Week 9; 2nd Place ($30,000) |
| Adriano "Adro" Sarnelli | 26 | Newcastle, New South Wales | Auto Body Shop Owner | Red Team | Eliminated Week 10 Biggest Loser ($200,000) |

^[T] Wal was originally chosen for the Blue Team, but was switched to the Red Team in week 3 after the minor challenge

^[E1] Harry was eliminated in week 4, but returned in Week 9 after winning the Eliminated Contestants weigh-in

^[E2] Adro was eliminated in week 10, but brought back to make a final 4

== Controversies ==
- In the first week of the show, contestant Ruth thought she was pregnant and almost left the show. She tested negative and returned to the competition.
- Trainer Bob Harper was absent for the second week of the show on season 1 after his mother suddenly died of a heart attack.
- At one stage in the game, Kristie, having earned immunity, used water loading to gain 5.9 kg which meant she had a large loss of 8 kg the following week. The water loading technique was then officially banned with a new rule stating that gaining weight would result in being at risk of elimination even if immunity had been won. This had happened before when Shane and Fiona used the technique to lose big numbers the following week, having won immunity in a card playing "temptation".
- After the contestants were reduced to a final three, one of the evicted guests was given an opportunity to re-enter the game. Jillian immediately voiced her opinion that it was unfair and pledged her allegiance to the previous final three. Harry was the contestant who won the right to return and he feuded with Jillian who was still not happy. After Adro was eliminated, he reportedly threatened legal action against the producers. In response, the show was edited to present the narrative that Bob and Jillian were unhappy about Harry being allowed to take vitamins while at home, framing it as an unfair advantage. As a result, Adro was reinstated, bringing the competition back to a final four heading into the finale.

== Records ==
A number of The Biggest Loser records were set during the first week, with contestant Wal losing 15.5 kg (34 lb), the most weight lost by any contestant in one week; together with the greatest total weight loss for all contestants with 97.8 kg (216 lb); and the Blue team losing the most weight by a single team with 56.4 kg (124 lb). Kristie lost the most percentage of body weight in the first week of any show. In later shows, Shane, Fiona and Kristie were the only contestants to gain weight, Shane gaining 2.3 kg (5.1 lb) and Fiona gaining 2.6 kg (5.7 lb) - both "Water Loaded" so they could lose more weight the following week. Similarly, a contestant on US season 4 utilized the same strategy, water loading to gain 7.7 kg (17 lb) in one week and then losing 14.9 kg (33 lb) the following week, although unlike Kristie, he did not have immunity, and gained the weight not to lose extra the next week, but to sabotage another player.
