= Steve Willis =

Australian personal trainer

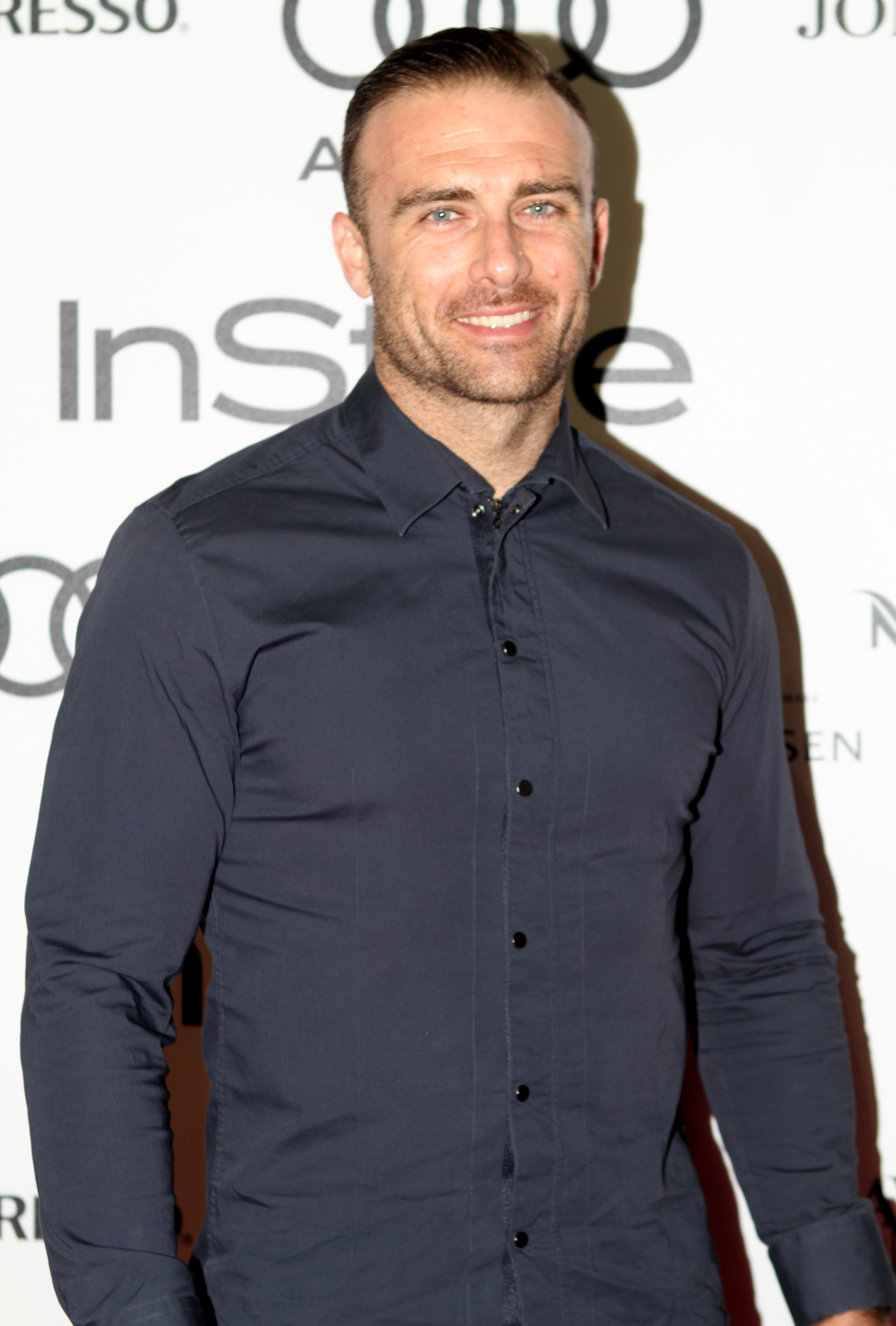
- Willis at the 2015 InStyle Awards
- Born: 5 June 1976 (age 50); Brisbane, Queensland, Australia
- Other name: Commando Steve
- Occupations: Personal trainer; author; television personality
- Known for: The Biggest Loser
- Height: 6 ft 2 in (188 cm)
- Children: 4

Steve Willis (born 5 June 1976), also known as Commando Steve, is an Australian personal trainer, author and television personality. He appeared on the Australian version of The Biggest Loser as a trainer from 2007 to 2015.

== Early life ==
Willis was born in Brisbane, Queensland, but grew up in Redcliffe. He is the eldest of four brothers.

Willis initially wanted to be a builder, but he joined the army in the 1990s. He started out in the Infantry, before being posted to the 4th Battalion, Royal Australian Regiment as a fitness instructor (later 2nd Commando Regiment). Willis left the army in 2004 (the 4th Battalion converted to a special forces unit on 1 February 1997, and was renamed the 2nd Commando Regiment on 19 June 2009). While working as a labourer, he studied personal training and specialises in CrossFit. Willis also competes in CrossFit Games. During a 2009 CrossFit competition, he came fourth out of 75 male competitors.

== Television career ==
In 2007, Willis joined the cast of The Biggest Loser as a trainer. Willis was known for wearing dark sunglasses, camo pants, and a black sleeveless shirt. Rarely smiling on the show, his motto was "there are no excuses". Speaking to Nick Galvin of The Sydney Morning Herald, Willis said, "When it comes to the training and my ethos, Steve Willis and the screen persona 'The Commando' are the same person. I believe passionately in what I do". Willis chose to depart The Biggest Loser after the tenth season aired in 2015.

In May 2018, Willis made his acting debut in television soap opera Home and Away, with a guest appearance as an AFP trainer. Two months later, it was confirmed that Willis had joined the cast of Australian Survivor: Champions vs. Contenders, which began airing in August. Willis became the 18th person eliminated from the show, and the 5th jury member.

== Personal life ==
Willis was in a relationship with fellow Biggest Loser trainer Michelle Bridges. Bridges gave birth to their first child, a son, in 2015. Willis has three more children from previous relationships.

== Bibliography ==
- Commando Steve: No Excuses! (2010)
- Get Commando Fit (2015)
- Get Commando Fit Cookbook (2015)
