= Shannan Ponton =

Australian personal trainer

- Born: 23 December 1973 (age 52); Australia
- Occupation: Personal Trainer
- Spouse: Kylie Stray (2010-present)
- Children: 3
- Website: www.thebiggestloser.com.au

Shannan Ponton is a personal trainer on the Australian version of The Biggest Loser. He made his first appearance during the show's second season in 2007, where he trained the blue team alongside Bob Harper. After Harper's departure during the second week of training, Ponton was left as the official trainer of the blue team, and he continued his role as the blue team's trainer during the show's third season in 2008. He has been the blue teams trainer for a total of 10 seasons as he continues in The Biggest Loser Australia 2016: Transformed. He attended Muirfield High School in North Rocks, New South Wales.

In 2020, Ponton participated in the Seven Network's reality program SAS Australia.

== Sources ==
- "Shannan Ponton". dailytelegraph.com.au. Archived from the original on 2 September 2012. – photo gallery
- "Shannan Ponton and Kylie Stray going strong in Bali". The Courier-Mail. 9 May 2009. Archived from the original on 27 October 2009. Relationship with Kylie Stray.
- "Big bite of reality for star hosts". 27 January 2009.
- Shannan Ponton – mbf
