= The Biggest Loser Australia: Couples =

- Genre: Reality television, Game show
- Created by: NBC and Network Ten
- Developed by: FremantleMedia Australia
- Presented by: Ehan Ali
- Starring: Michelle Bridges; Shannan Ponton; Steve Willis (Commando); Emma Hutton ("Emazon")
- Opening theme: "Lift" by Shannon Noll
- Country of origin: Australia
- Original language: English
- No. of episodes: 75 (list of episodes)

Production
- Executive producers: Paul Franklin; Jonathon Summerhayes; Tara McWilliams
- Production locations: Fitzroy Island, Queensland Australia "Camp Biggest Loser", Manly, New South Wales, Australia

Original release
- Network: Network Ten
- Release: 1 February – 27 April 2009

Related
- Season 3 (2008); Season 5 (2010); The Biggest Loser (American TV series)

The fourth season of the Australian version of the original NBC American reality television series The Biggest Loser, known as The Biggest Loser Australia: Couples, premiered on 1 February 2009 on Network Ten. Series Host Ajay Rochester reprised her role for the fourth season, along with trainers Shannan Ponton, Michelle Bridges and Steve Willis ("The Commando"). The show also introduced a new trainer Emma Hutton ("Emazon"). Applications opened mid-2008 for potential contestants. On 27 April, Bob Herdsman was crowned the oldest contestant in Australian History to ever win with a record weight loss of 87.6 kg, or 52.21% of his starting weight, and won $200,000 in prize money.

== Season Overview ==
=== Game variations ===
- Couples: Season Four began with contestants split into 10 teams of two, each with a preexisting relationship. These couples were divided into two groups for training purposes only - the contestants challenges, temptations and eliminations in their pairs. In the sixth week, the pairs were dissolved and the contestants were split into a red team and a blue team.
- Double or nothing bracelets: In the first week, The Walk introduced the double and nothing bracelets to the game. One player was given a gold bracelet (the "double" bracelet) and another player was given a silver bracelet (the "nothing" bracelet). The contestants chosen to hold the bracelets will retain possession of them until the finale or until they are eliminated, whichever happens first. If a contestant with a bracelet is eliminated, he or she must then give the bracelet to one of the remaining contestants. If the contestant in possession of the double bracelet is a finalist and wins the weigh-in at the finale, that contestant will receive double the standard grand prize. If the contestant with the nothing bracelet is a finalist and wins the weigh-in at the finale, however, that contestant will receive nothing. Also, no contestant can have both the double and nothing bracelets at one time.
- Castaways: In Week 7, after Nathan was "eliminated", he was given a letter by Ajay, instructing him to choose one other person to eliminate with him, and he chose Bob. But they both later found out they weren't technically eliminated from the game, just from the house, and that they would be taken back to Fitzroy Island to be trained by the Commando for the next 5 weeks, and the person that has lost the most weight overall would be guaranteed a spot in the (now) Final Four. That person was Bob, having lost 76.2 kg, or 45.41% to Nathan's 46.2 kg, or 31.82%

=== Cast and personalities ===
- Host: Ajay Rochester has returned for a fourth season.
- Trainers:s Michelle Bridges and Shannan Ponton have also returned, along with Steve Willis ("The Commando") and new trainer Emma Hutton ("Emazon").Nutrition consultant Professor Clare Collins PhD FDAA

==== Contestants ====
There are 20 contestants in this season, competing as ten teams of two.

Members	Age	State	Occupation	Couples Team	Blue vs. Red 1	Blue vs. Red 2	Status
Tania Diana	28	Melbourne, VIC	Insurance Manager	Brown Team (Newlyweds)			Eliminated Week 1
Ramses Diana	28	Melbourne, VIC	Car Rental Supervisor	Brown Team (Newlyweds)			Eliminated Week 1
Jodi Nolte	25	Casula, NSW	Mother of Two	Pink Team (Best Friends)			Eliminated Week 2
Jeda Symonds-Poynton	23	Casula, NSW	Mother of Two	Pink Team (Best Friends)			Eliminated Week 2
Ben Terry	29	Newcastle, NSW	Public Servant	Green Team (Teammates)			Eliminated Week 4
Holly Scouler	20	Perth, WA	Accounts Manager	Yellow Team (Sisters)			Eliminated Week 5
Melanie "Mel" Scouler	18	Perth, WA	Receptionist	Yellow Team (Sisters)			Eliminated Week 5
Amanda Brock	34	Whitebridge, NSW	Office Worker	Purple Team (Husband & Wife)	Red Team		Eliminated Week 3, Returned mid-Week 5 - The Walk, Re-Eliminated Week 6
Teresa Hamilton	28	WA	Supermarket Packer	Orange Team (Workmates)	Blue Team	Blue Team	Eliminated Week 8
Andrew Miles	23	Hervey Bay, QLD	Disability Support Worker	Light Blue Team (Brothers)	Blue Team	Red Team	Eliminated Week 9
Meaghan Trattles	26	QLD	Social Worker	Dark Blue Team (Mother & Daughter)	Red Team	Red Team	Eliminated Week 10 - Challenge
Sean Doudle	38	Newcastle, NSW	Delivery Driver	Green Team (Teammates)	Blue Team	Blue Team	Eliminated Week 4, Returned mid-Week 5 - The Walk, Eliminated Week 10
Julie Trattles	52	QLD	Fabric Store Manager	Dark Blue Team (Mother & Daughter)	Blue Team	Blue Team	Eliminated Week 11
Stewart Brock	44	Whitebridge, NSW		Purple Team (Husband & Wife)			Eliminated Week 3, Returned Week 11, Eliminated mid-Week 12 - The Walk
Cameron Fisher	52	Gold Coast, QLD	Tyre Shop Owner	Red Team (Father & Daughter)	Red Team	Blue Team	Eliminated Week 12
Nathan Miles	31	Hervey Bay, QLD	Disability Support Worker	Light Blue Team (Brothers)	Red Team	Castaways	Eliminated Week 11
Samantha "Sammy" Fisher	20	Gold Coast, QLD	Tyre Shop Consultant	Red Team (Father & Daughter)	Red Team	Red Team	3rd Runner-Up
Sharif Deen	26	QLD	Call Centre Team Leader	Orange Team (Workmates)	Red Team	Red Team	Eliminated Mid-Week 9 (Walk), Returned Week 11, 2nd Runner-Up
Tiffany Herdsman	22	Bunbury, WA	Roadhouse Worker	Grey Team (In-Laws)	Blue Team	Blue Team	Runner-Up
Bob Herdsman	56	Bunbury, WA	Roadhouse Owner	Grey Team (In-Laws)	Blue Team	Castaways	The Biggest Loser

Note: * Holly and Melanie were given a "double vote" as a result of Nathan and Andrew's second walk. As a result, Holly and Melanie's vote was definitive in voting Jodi and Jeda off the show.

Note: ** In week three a second "elimination" was performed with incredibly short notice after the normal elimination, resulting in Nathan & Andrew getting four nominations. In another twist Ajay revealed that they had a lifeline, in which they would compete against the average weight loss percentage of the other six couples and if they won they would have the one and only vote at the next elimination.

Note: *** In week 11, both Stewart and Sharif returned to the competition, to compete in singles.

^Note A: After the red team chose to eliminate Nathan, he received a letter instructing him to select one other player from either the red or the blue teams to leave the house with him. To increase his brother's chances of winning the overall title, Nathan chose Bob to join him. After leaving Camp Biggest Loser with the belief that they had just been eliminated from the game, Nathan and Bob were greeted by the Commando and informed that they would be returning to Fitzroy Island to spend the next five weeks training with the Commando. At the conclusion of those five weeks, the man who had lost the most weight during their time on the island would receive a guaranteed spot in the finale.

=== Game elements ===
The episodes and elements of the show are screened on a weekly rotation, generally in the following set up:

- Sunday: Conclusion of the Major Challenge, Last Chance Training and Weigh-In.
- Monday: Elimination
- Tuesday: Warehouse or Challenge
- Wednesday: Temptation
- Thursday: "The Walk"
- Friday: Major Challenge

==== Teams ====
The contestants originally competed in their couples teams, but were later re-organised into a blue team and a red team (and later, a white team, training with The Commando for a guaranteed spot in the finale). As of week 9, the contestants are competing as singles, wearing black shirts, and even being known as a "Black team" (possibly to counter-act the Commando's "White Team").

In week 11 (second-chance week), the eliminated contestants returned and wore their original couples team colours (although competing as individuals), and competed for 4 "wildcard" white T-shirts.

In week 12, Castaways Bob and Nathan returned to Camp Biggest Loser to weigh in. Bob beat out Nathan to earn a black T-shirt and claim the 4th and final spot in the Final 4.

Contestant	Week																
Contestant	1	2	3	4	5	6	7	8	9	10	11					12	Finale
Contestant	1	2	3	4	5	6	7	8	9	10	Day 1	Day 2	Day 3	Day 4	Day 5	12	Finale
Bob	In-Laws					Blue Team		Castaways (fake eliminated)									Finalist
Tiffany	In-Laws					Blue Team			Black Team								Finalist
Sharif	Work Mates					Red Team			Black Team	Eliminated	Eliminated Contestant		Wildcard			Black Team	Finalist
Sammy	Father & Daughter					Red Team			Black Team								Finalist
Nathan	Brothers					Red Team		Castaways (fake eliminated)								Eliminated	Eliminated Contestant
Cameron	Father & Daughter					Red Team		Blue Team	Black Team								Eliminated Contestant
Stewart	Husband & Wife			Eliminated							Eliminated Contestant				Wildcard	Black Team	Eliminated Contestant
Julie	Mother & Daughter					Blue Team			Black Team							Eliminated	Eliminated Contestant
Sean	Team Mates				"Odd Couple"	Blue Team			Black Team		Eliminated Contestant				Wildcard	Eliminated	Eliminated Contestant
Meaghan	Mother & Daughter					Red Team			Black Team		Eliminated Contestant				Eliminated		Eliminated Contestant
Andrew	Brothers					Blue Team		Red Team	Black Team	Eliminated	Eliminated Contestant				Eliminated		Eliminated Contestant
Teresa	Work Mates					Blue Team			Eliminated		Eliminated Contestant				Eliminated		Eliminated Contestant
Amanda	Husband & Wife			Eliminated	"Odd Couple"	Red Team	Eliminated				Eliminated Contestant		Left under doctor's orders				Eliminated Contestant
Holly	Sisters					Eliminated					Eliminated Contestant	Left voluntarily					Eliminated Contestant
Mel	Sisters					Eliminated					Eliminated Contestant	Left voluntarily					Eliminated Contestant
Ben	Team Mates				Eliminated						Eliminated Contestant	Eliminated					Eliminated Contestant
Jodi	Best Friends		Eliminated								Eliminated Contestant	Wildcard				Eliminated	Eliminated Contestant
Jeda	Best Friends		Eliminated								Eliminated Contestant				Eliminated		Eliminated Contestant
Tania	Newlyweds	Eliminated									Eliminated Contestant		Eliminated				Eliminated Contestant
Ramses	Newlyweds	Eliminated									Eliminated Contestant				Eliminated		Eliminated Contestant

==== Bracelets ====
The two bracelets were introduced in week 1's Walk, and have moved around over the course of the series due to other Walks and Eliminations. The Double bracelet has the power to double the prize money (to $400,000) if worn by the winner of the overall competition, while the Nothing bracelet has the power to deny the prize money (to $0) if worn by the overall winner. If the wearer of a bracelet is eliminated, that person must choose onto which of the remaining contestants to pass their bracelet.

Bracelet	Week												
Bracelet	1	2	3	4	5	6	7	8	9	10	11	12	Finale
Double ($$)	Holly		Tiffany			Tiffany	Teresa		Sammy			Tiffany	
Nothing	Meaghan					Meaghan			Meaghan	Cameron			Sharif

==== Weigh-ins ====
Weigh-ins occur every week. They show the contestant's weight, previous weight and difference. Every week contestants are weighed in. While the contestants are in "couples", the two couples with the lowest weight loss percentages are eligible for elimination. When the game shifts to "singles", the two players with the lowest weight loss percentages are eligible for elimination. After the finalists are decided, they go home for a certain amount of time to continue their diets at home until the live finale where they are weighed in one last time and the winner, the "Biggest Loser", is crowned. The contestant's weekly results can be seen below, and are listed in chronological order of elimination, with the exception of the finalists, whose results are listed in order of their position on the leaderboard.

Contestant	Age	Height	Starting BMI	Ending BMI	Starting weight	Week															Kilos lost	Percentage lost
Contestant	Age	Height	Starting BMI	Ending BMI	Starting weight	1	2	3	4	5	6	7	8	9	10	11^{2}			12	Finale	Kilos lost	Percentage lost
Bob	57	168	59.5	28.4	167.8	155	147.4	140.9	135.1	126.4	122	114.9	113.9	104.9	101.7	X	X	X	91.6	80.2	87.6	52.21%
Tiffany	28	163	42.8	22.4	113.6	106.9	103.9	99.5	95.2	90.4	86.9	83.8	82.2	80.2	76.5	X	X	71.3	67.9	59.5	54.1	47.62%
Sharif	32	192	48.4	28.7	178.3	168.3	164.3	161.2	154	146.6	145.4	137.6	132.9	LEFT		129.1	117.7	(117.7)	112.2	105.8	72.5	40.66%
Sammy	20	162	45.2	27.6	118.6	112.8	109.3	106.5	101.5	97.3	94.8	91.8	89.1	87	83.8	X	X	80.4	78.2	72.5	46.1	38.87%
Nathan	32	176	46.9	31.7	145.2	135.4	130.5	127.1	122.1	115.7	114.4	109.3	109.2	104.2	105.5	X	X	X	99	98.3	46.9	32.30%
Cameron	53	178	51.8	33.9	164.1	154.4	150.7	147.3	142.1	137.2	135.3	132	127.4	122.6	121.9	X	X	115.5	114.4	107.5	56.6	34.49%
Stewart	44	181	41.6	26.9	136.4	128.7	123.5	121								100.1	91.6	(91.6)	LEFT	88.0	48.4	35.48%
Julie	52	165	45.3	29.3	123.4	117	112.6	110.2	106.4	102.9	100.2	96.1	94.9	92.5	89.9	X	X	87		79.8	43.6	35.33%
Sean	38	181	40.4	25.9	132.5	125	120.1	115.7	106.9^{1}	103.8	99.4	95.8	92.8	91.4	89.6*	89.6	89			84.8	47.7	36.00%
Jodi	26	163	45.7	32.9	121.5	114	112.5									94.6	90.5			87.5	34.0	27.98%
Meaghan	26	170	37.9	25.3	109.6	103.3	100.3	98.4	93.9	91.2	88	84.8	81.9	80.6	LEFT	79.7				73.2	36.4	33.21%
Andrew	23	190	39.9	27.2	144.2	136	132	129.5	121.9	116.7	114.8	110.4	107	105.6		102.1				99.5	44.7	31.00%
Teresa	28	167	41.2	27.3	115	107.3	103.1	101.1	94.6	90.8	87.8	84.5	82.6			81.8				76.0	39.0	33.91%
Amanda	34	170	59.0	39.3	170.4	161.7	155.9	155.2		142.4	136					128.3				113.6	56.8	33.33%
Holly	20	178	34.1	26.0	108.2	101.9	98.7	97.5	91.4	88.1						82.7				82.3	25.9	23.94%
Mel	18	173	34.1	26.8	102	98.5	95.8	93.4	90.3	87.5						80.3				80.3	21.7	21.27%
Ben	29	187	43.8	28.1	153.1	146	140.9	138.2	129.7							113.9				98.2	54.9	35.86%
Jeda	23	165	39.0	31.2	106.3	101.4	99.3									86.6				85.0	21.3	20.04%
Tania	28	169	47.5	41.0	135.7	131.5										123.7				117.2	18.5	13.63%
Ramses	29	170	47.7	37.9	137.9	129.8										117.1				109.4	28.5	20.67%

===== Legend =====
Teams

- Member of Shannon's Team (Week 6-8)
- Member of Michelle's Team (Week 6-8)
- Member of merged team (Individuals, week 9+)
- The two "Castaways" training with the Commando (Week 8+)

Winner

- $200,000 Winner (among the finalists)
- $30,000 Winner (among the eliminated contestants)

Standings

- Week's Biggest Loser
- Immunity (Temptation/Challenge or Weigh-In)
- Below the Yellow Line
- Last person eliminated before Finale
- Results from Eliminated Contestants' Weigh-In
- Contestant left before the Weigh-In
- Weight measurement
- LEFT - The contestant was eliminated before a formal elimination, possibly due to "The Walk".
- Results from "Castaways" Weigh-In, taken from Fitzroy Island
- Results from Eliminated Contestants' Weigh-In at the Finale
- "Castaway" who lost out on Final 4 spot

BMIs

- Healthy Body Mass Index (18.5 - 25.0 BMI)
- Overweight Body Mass Index (25.1 - 30 BMI)
- Obese Body Mass Index (30.1 - 35 BMI)
- Clinically Obese Body Mass Index (35.1 - 40 BMI)
- Morbidly Obese Body Mass Index (over 40 BMI)

^Note 1: In these weeks, the biggest loser for the week was also below the Yellow Line.

^Note 2: Week 11 was second-chance week for all the eliminated contestants. At the beginning of the week, all eliminated contestants weighed-in. At the end of the week, only 4 of these eliminated contestants, the ones who held the "wildcard" white T-shirts, weighed-in. The two "wildcard" contestants who were above the Yellow Line (Sharif and Stewart) then faced off the four original remaining contestants as they weighed-in.

Notes

- Jodi & Jeda, Ben, and Stewart trained with Shannon while Tania & Ramses and Holly & Mel trained with Michelle before the teams were re-formed into Red Team and Blue Team in week 6.
- Andrew, Sean, Tiffany, and Julie were part of Shannon's re-formed Blue Team while Cameron, Meaghan, Sammy and Sharif were part of Michelle's re-formed Red Team before week 8.
- Andrew and Cameron swapped teams in week 8 (Cameron went to the Blue Team, while Andrew went to the Red Team).
- As of week 9, the competition went into singles, so all of the contestants started wearing black shirts, and now both trainers share the contestants.
- At the beginning of week 11, all the eliminated contestants apart from Nathan and Bob returned and weighed in.
- Sean was eliminated for only 1 day and came back when all the contestants returned.
- At the end of week 11, Jodi, Sharif, Sean and Stewart were in the "wildcard" weigh-in, which saw Sharif and Stewart return to the competition and immediately face-off with Cameron, Julie, Sammy and Tiffany in a standard weigh-in.
- Bob and Nathan became "Castaways" and trained with the Commando on Fitzroy Island from Week 8 to Week 12. However, Bob beat out Nathan at the Week 12 weigh in to earn the 4th place in the Biggest Loser finale and a black T-shirt.

==== Weigh-in figures history ====
Contestant	Week												Finale
Contestant	1	2	3	4	5	6	7	8	9	10	11	12	Finale
Bob	-12.8	-7.6	-6.5	-5.8	-8.7	-4.4	-7.1	-1.0	-9.0	-3.2	X	-10.1	-87.6
Tiffany	-6.7	-3.0	-4.4	-4.3	-4.8	-3.5	-3.1	-1.6	-2.0	-3.7	-5.2	-3.4	-54.1
Sharif	-10.0	-4.0	-3.1	-7.2	-7.4	-1.2	-7.8	-4.7	X		-11.4	-5.5	-72.5
Sammy	-5.8	-3.5	-2.8	-5.0	-4.2	-2.5	-3.0	-2.7	-2.1	-3.2	-3.4	-2.2	-46.1
Nathan	-9.8	-4.9	-3.4	-5.0	-6.4	-1.3	-5.1	-0.1	-5.0	+1.3	X	-6.5	-46.9
Cameron	-9.7	-3.7	-3.4	-5.2	-4.9	-1.9	-3.3	-4.6	-4.8	-0.7	-6.4	-1.1	-56.6
Stewart	-7.7	-5.2	-2.5								-8.5	X	-48.4
Julie	-6.4	-4.4	-2.4	-3.8	-3.5	-2.7	-4.1	-1.2	-2.4	-2.6	-2.9		-43.6
Sean	-7.5	-4.9	-4.4	-8.8	-3.1	-4.4	-3.6	-3.0	-1.4	-1.8			-47.7
Meaghan	-6.3	-3.0	-1.9	-4.5	-2.7	-3.2	-3.2	-2.9	-1.3	X			-36.4
Andrew	-8.2	-4.0	-2.5	-7.6	-5.2	-1.9	-4.4	-3.4	-1.4				-44.7
Teresa	-7.7	-4.2	-2.0	-6.5	-3.8	-3.0	-3.3	-1.9					-39.0
Amanda	-8.7	-5.8	-0.7		-12.8	-6.4							-56.8
Holly	-6.3	-3.2	-1.2	-6.1	-3.3								-25.9
Mel	-3.5	-2.7	-2.4	-3.1	-2.8								-21.7
Ben	-7.1	-5.1	-2.7	-8.5									-54.9
Jodi	-7.5	-1.5											-34.0
Jeda	-4.9	-2.1											-21.3
Tania	-4.2												-18.5
Ramses	-8.1												-28.5

- The finale result loss is taken for first weight-finale weight, not from Week 12-finale.

Weigh-In Results for Fitzroy Island "Castaways"

Castaway who lost out on a spot in the finalist group

==== Warehouses or Challenges ====
Every week, at the warehouse the contestants are given two options that will be their staple food for the rest of the week as in 2008. Some weeks, a challenge will take place instead, as happened in 2006 and 2007.

Week 1 - Chickens vs. Eggs: The choices were between barbecued chicken or uncooked eggs. All ten couples decided to choose the eggs because it can be cooked in any way and the chicken option was higher in fat.

Week 2 - Race to Sydney Challenge: Teams had to travel from Fitzroy Island to Camp Biggest Loser in Manly. The first team to arrive won immunity and the last team to finish suffered a two kilogram weight penalty at the next weigh in.

Week 3 - Commando: Each couple had to decide between them which would go to an unknown destination. What they didn't know is that it was a Commando training session. Although Julie had a very difficult time during the session, everyone managed to get through the training session. After the session, the Commando kept Sharif and Mel, as the contestants who had lost the smallest amounts of weight that week with him until further notice.

Week 4 - Fast Food vs. $5 A Day: The two options were either ordering take out food every day for a week or five dollars per person per day for the week. Since Nathan & Andrew were up against the rest of the couples, they had the right to choose first. They decided to go for the $5 a day option knowing if they were to take the other option, the other team would have $60 a day. After selection, Sean really took it hard as he stated that he would not go for fast food ever again.

Week 5 - Raw Food vs. Straw Food: This week, the contestants had a choice between raw food and straw food. With raw food, the contestants would be able to eat anything they liked, provided it was not cooked or heated in any way. With straw food, contestants would be able to eat only food that could be consumed with a straw. As the biggest losers at the previous weigh-in (after Ben and Sean, who had been eliminated), Teresa and Sharif were given the power to select one option for themselves, leaving the remaining contestants with the other. They selected raw food, leaving the remaining teams to eat only blended food for the week. Meaghan thought it was a good choice, but Holly believed straw food was the better option.

Week 6 - Cycle for Money: This week, instead of a warehouse, all contestants had 24 hours to cycle on a spin bike for cash. For every kilometre they cycle, they gain 10 cents.

Week 7 - Dine In vs. Dine Out: Sean was the biggest loser for the week after Amanda (who had been eliminated), so he got to choose between "Dine In" and "Dine Out" for his team, with the other team getting the other option. However, he didn't know what either option entailed. He chose "Dine In" for his team, which involved them eating nothing but frozen meals. The other team got to "Dine Out", for which they were taken away to a secret location to face Emazon. Each member had to face Emazon in the boxing ring while the rest of the team completed a circuit. If the team member was able to stand up to Emazon, they got to choose a food group for their food for the week. All five members stood up to Emazon and the team returned with five food groups.

Week 8 - N/A: No warehouse challenge was shown this week, as the episode instead focused on Nathan's choice of Bob for a surprise "elimination" and their later encounter with The Commando.

Week 9 - N/A: No warehouse challenge was shown this week, as the episode instead focused on the dissolving of teams and the contestants finding out about Nathan and Bob on Fitzroy Island.

Week 10 - N/A: No warehouse challenge was shown this week, as the episode instead focused on the contestants' "Back to the future" hike up Mount Tarawera in New Zealand. As they walked up the dormant volcano, they passed through a series of gates, each representing one week in the past 9 weeks of their time on The Biggest Loser, starting at week 9 and working backwards. At each week's gate, the trainers Shannon and Michelle added to each contestant's backpack the weight that they lost in that week, so that they could feel the weight they lost, remember who they were, and acknowledge their past so as to look to their future.

Week 11 - N/A: No warehouse challenge was shown this week, as the episode instead focused on the return of all the eliminated contestants for second-chance week, and their initial weigh-ins.

Week 12 - N/A: No warehouse challenge was shown this week. The episode instead featured the "Train The Trainers" session, the contestants viewing their audition DVDs, and the contestants putting on their dream outfits, as well as Bob and Nathan while carrying in their backpacks the weight they've lost.

==== Temptations ====
Temptation is generally an opportunity for a couple or contestant to win immunity for the next weigh-in. This means that even if their weight loss means they would fall below the yellow line, they will not be up for elimination and the next couple or contestant with the lowest percentage of weight loss will take their place under the yellow line. As well as winning immunity, the couple or contestant also gains the responsibility of taking 'The Walk'. To win immunity, an element of risk is involved as couples or contestants may have to eat high calorie or unhealthy foods for a chance to win immunity and this could jeopardise their performance in the next weigh-in.

Temptation is symbolic of the fact that foods offered in temptation may be foods that tempt the contestants in the outside world and some contestants restrain from temptation for the fact that they want to steer away from these foods for good.

Week	Title	Description	Winner(s)	Calories consumed
1	Race to the Platters	Six covered plates were placed in front of the couples. One of them contained immunity and the rest contained high calorie foods. The possibilities included some lolly-pops, a chocolate éclair, cheesecake, chocolate cake, and a burger "with the lot" and chips (2019 calories). The first to grab the covered plate with immunity would win it. If the contestant chose one of the food plates, both teammates would have to eat the food. Every couple of minutes, the highest calorie food was removed, increasing the chances of immunity. Eventually, when there were two options, many considered going for the immunity, and in the end Nathan and Andrew took both the final plates to win immunity as a couple. The rest of the contestants then knew that Nathan and Andrew were "playing the game". This, Andrew and Nathan felt, would make them targets for elimination.	Andrew & Nathan	80 cal each
2	N/A	Because of the Race to Sydney challenge (see above), no Temptation was played this week. However, immunity and the power of The Walk were given to the couple that came first in the Race to Sydney challenge.	N/A	0 cal
3	Wooden Spoon	Similar to last year's golden fork temptation, the couples had to grab the wooden spoon in order to be in the running for immunity. The kitchen had been decked out in foods from the bakery, but the temptation foods were doughnuts. The foods ranged from a small cinnamon doughnut at 70 calories to the chocolate jam and cream-filled doughnut with hundreds and thousands at 1275 calories. As Nathan and Andrew were the current holders of immunity, they were the first to play. AJ asked them who they wanted to play against, and they chose the green team. Immediately, the green team Mates took the wooden spoon and won. The light blue team withdrew and the green team were then asked who they wanted to play against next. For the rest of the rounds, despite some players – such as Cameron – wanting the food and a chance for immunity, everyone else refused to take the spoon, and as a result, Ben & Sean won immunity having eaten just 70 calories. Also, since Mel and Sharif were with the Commando, Holly and Teresa represented themselves without their partner. The other couples had all expressed a desire to go for immunity in order to take it from Nathan & Andrew. But, as they discovered that Nathan & Andrew no longer had it, and so as not to take in unnecessary calories, they stood firm and didn't give in to temptation. After the challenge, Bob & Tiffany got to see their family for one day because Bob had been the biggest loser for two weeks running and had the greatest percentage weight loss in week two.	Ben & Sean	70 cal each
4	Italian Temptation	For this temptation, one contestant at a time had to decide whether to eat any food for immunity or not. For the first time, each couple was not allowed to consult with their partners whether to go for immunity or not. For this temptation, as it was "one vs all" week, Nathan & Andrew were not able to compete for immunity. If none of the six couples went for immunity, no one would hold immunity and Nathan & Andrew would have the power of the walk. Meaghan, despite not eating, commented that she was tempted by the chef instead of the food. In the end, Teresa ate a Vegetarian Pizza (180 calories); Holly also ate a Vegetarian Pizza (180 calories); and Sharif ate a Chicken Parmigiana (550 calories) to win immunity for Teresa & Sharif.	Teresa & Sharif	Teresa (180 cal) Sharif (550 cal)
5	Milkshake Wars	For this temptation, each contestant wearing blindfolds had to decide whether to drink the banana and strawberry milkshake for immunity. They had twenty minutes to decide whether to drink or not, and were not allowed to talk to anyone on the table. Sharif, Teresa and Sammy all decided not to drink their milkshakes. In the end, Nathan drank the whole three litres (3000 calories) to claim immunity for him and his brother.	Andrew & Nathan	Nathan (3000 cal) Andrew (1375 cal)
6	Chocolate Poker	The contestants were seated around a poker table with items of chocolate of various calorie counts in front of them. Each in turn could place a bet in calories of chocolate, with each succeeding player needing to match the bet with the option of raising it, or else drop out of the game. Whoever was the last player in the game had to eat their bet to win immunity. This was the first Temptation where contestants competed individually for immunity, rather than as couples. Andrew bet a mini Milky Way (62 calories). All other players dropped out of the game, except Nathan, who raised the bet over his brother to 2 mini Milky Ways (124 calories). Andrew dropped out, and Nathan ate the 2 mini Milky Ways to win Temptation.	Nathan	124 cal
7	Favourite Food	The contestants were seated along a table with their favourite meal in front of them, totalling 1000 calories, which they had symbolically thrown away seven weeks earlier on Fitzroy Island. To play Temptation, they had to eat the entire meal within 15 minutes. If more than one person finished their meal, those people would progress to the second round, with desserts. Furthermore, the contestants were divided by screens so they couldn't see who was eating. Sharif was the only one to eat and finish his meal, so he won immunity.	Sharif	1000 cal
8	Fortune Cookies	The contestants went to Kam Fook Restaurant, and were seated around a table. They were each presented with a bowl full of 100 fortune cookies. One fortune cookie within each bowl contained immunity. Each fortune cookie contained 25 calories. They had 30 minutes to eat as many cookies as they wanted in order to find immunity. Whoever found immunity first would win it, but if no one found it within the time limit, only those who had eaten at least one cookie would go to the next round. In the next round, there would only be one cookie for each player, and only one containing immunity. The one who picks the correct cookie would win immunity. Sharif started to eat cookies but stopped after seven (175 calories) without finding immunity. No one else ate within the time limit, so Sharif won immunity.	Sharif	175 cal
9	N/A	There was no Temptation this week, as the episode instead focused on the contestants receiving full-body makeovers. However, there was still a Walk (see below), and immunity was the prize for the major challenge instead.	N/A	0 cal
10	N/A	There was no Temptation this week, as the episode instead focused on Sammy, Sean and Cameron's "Face Your Fears" personal challenges, in which each contestant would perform an activity that would get them to face their greatest fears. Sammy went whitewater rafting, Sean jumped out of a helicopter into Lake Tarawera, and Cameron went abseiling.	N/A	0 cal
11	Table of Presents	This week was second-chance week for the eliminated contestants, so Temptation was played between the eliminated contestants (except for Holly and Mel who left beforehand voluntarily). There was a table with 6 presents along it. In each present was a different item: the prize of an 8-day trek for 2 to North Vietnam (valued at $5500), the prize of a SYM VS 125cc scooter (valued at $3499), chocolate crackles (961 calories) that the contestant had to eat, fairy bread (220 calories) that the contestant had to eat, elimination (a card that said "Go home"), and a "wildcard" white T-shirt. As there were 12 contestants but only 6 presents, they would have to race and put their hand on a present before anyone else to claim it. Sharif ate the fairy bread, Meaghan won the scooter, Andrew ate the chocolate crackles, Jodi won the white T-shirt, Ben was eliminated, and Stewart won the holiday to Vietnam.	Jodi	0 cal
12	N/A	Instead of Temptation this week, there was the final challenge (see "Escalator Challenge" below). The power of the final Walk was the prize for the winner of the final challenge.	N/A	0 cal

==== "The Walk" ====
Week 1 - Nathan and Andrew - Nathan and Andrew picked the double and nothing bracelets. They gave the Nothing bracelet to Meaghan and the Double bracelet to Holly.

Week 2 - Nathan and Andrew - Nathan and Andrew had to pick one of the four discs, each containing two couples (Nathan and Andrew isn't one of them). They picked up a disc that said Jodi & Jeda and Holly & Melanie. As a result, they had to decide which of the two teams will receive a double vote at the next elimination. They decided on Holly & Melanie in hopes that they will vote with them. Holly & Melanie initially didn't want it, but played along knowing that they weren't trustworthy.

Week 3 - Ben and Sean - Ben and Sean had to pick one of two discs: one was to move the double bracelet to another contestant, the other was to move the nothing bracelet to another contestant. Ben and Sean chose the disc that required them to move the double bracelet to another contestant. As a result, Holly had to give up the bracelet to Tiffany.

Week 4 - Teresa and Sharif - Sharif picked a disc out of one of two vessels of water, which was revealed to be a disc that said Give a couple pleasure. Then in a surprise twist Teresa was told that it was now her turn, and she took the other disc that said Give a couple pain. Sharif and Teresa gave the "pleasure" to Julie & Meaghan which resulted in them being pampered and the "pain" was given to Holly & Melanie which made them take Emazon's challenge.

Week 5 - Nathan and Andrew - Before Nathan and Andrew picked up any discs, the four eliminated couples returned and stood beside Ajay on the walk. Ajay told Nathan & Andrew that two of them will be returning to the game. There were four vessels, each containing a disc inscribed with the names of an eliminated couple. Nathan & Andrew each picked a disc, which revealed "Ben & Sean" and "Amanda & Stewart". Nathan & Andrew were not happy for picking these two names because they wanted Jodi & Jeda to get their alliance back and Tania & Ramses to strengthen Michelle's training alliance. After the couples were selected, Ajay told the selected couples that only one person from each couple will return to the house as the "odd couple". Each couple would decide for themselves which of them would return. As a result, Sean and Amanda returned to the house.

Week 6 - Nathan - The purpose of this Walk was to dissolve the couples teams and form new red and blue teams. There were two vessels. One vessel had a disc for Nathan to choose another couple to split up, one on each of the new teams, and those two people would then pick the new teams. The other vessel's disc would split Nathan and his partner Andrew up, so that they would start and pick the new teams. The disc revealed that he had to pick one couple to pick the red and blue teams. In the end, he chose Julie & Meaghan to pick teams, splitting them up. Nathan also had to choose who out of Julie and Meaghan would be on the red team (training with Michelle) and who would be on the blue team (training with Shannon), and also who would get first pick. Nathan chose for Julie to be blue and Meaghan to be red, and for Julie to get first pick. Julie (blue) and Meaghan (red) chose their teams as follows: Sean (blue), Nathan (red), Andrew (blue), Sharif (red), Bob (blue), Amanda (red), Teresa (blue), Sammy (red), Tiffany (blue), Cameron (red).

Week 7 - Sharif - There were two vessels. One vessel had a disc for Sharif to choose a bracelet to take himself, and the other had a disc for Sharif to choose a bracelet to give to another contestant. He picked out the disc to give a bracelet to another contestant. He chose to take the double bracelet from Tiffany and give it to Teresa, his former couples partner.

Week 8 - Sharif - There were two vessels. One vessel had a disc for the red team to decide as a group to choose someone to swap with a member from the blue team. The other was for the blue team to decide as a group to choose someone to swap with a member from the red team. Either way, a swap will happen. Sharif chose the vessel on the right and gave him and the red team the power to decide who will be swapped. The only catch is that Sharif cannot be involved with the swap. When the decision was made, the red team constantly tricked the blue team with their decision by passing the blue shirt around until they announced that Cameron will be moved to the blue team due to his poor performance in challenges. Sharif then gave the red shirt to Andrew for consistently losing big numbers in weigh-ins and for good performance in challenges.

Week 9 - Meaghan - Although there was no Temptation this week, the contestants received a letter that they would need to decide among themselves who would go on The Walk. They had only 30 minutes to decide. As the alliance consisting of Meaghan, Julie, Tiffany, Cameron and Sammy held the majority of the remaining 8 contestants, it was decided that Meaghan should go on The Walk (as the other 3 couldn't outvote the alliance). On The Walk, there were two vessels. One vessel had a disc for Meaghan to choose one male contestant to eliminate or choose to eliminate herself. The other had a disc for Meaghan to choose one female contestant to eliminate or choose to eliminate herself. Meaghan picked from the vessel on the right (because it had pink flowers), and picked out the disc to eliminate a male contestant or herself. Meaghan only had 1 hour to make her decision. Meaghan wouldn't have eliminated herself or Cameron, as they were part of the alliance, so that left Sean, Andrew and Sharif to choose from. Andrew suggested to Meaghan that he didn't need to still be in the competition, although he still wanted to be there, whereas the other two choices still needed to be there. However, Meaghan chose to eliminate Sharif, because he was the greatest threat to Meaghan's alliance. Should she have picked the other vessel, it would completely ruin Meaghan's alliance by voting one of their own and would either eliminate Sammy or Tiffany since she wouldn't vote herself out or her mother Julie.

Week 10 - N/A - There was no Walk this week, as the episode instead focused on Tiffany, Meaghan and Julie's "Face Your Fears" personal challenges, in which each contestant would perform an activity that would get them to face their greatest fears. Tiffany went skydiving, while both Meaghan and Julie were suspended below a helicopter flying over Mount Tarawera.

Week 11 - N/A - There was no Walk this week, as the episode instead focused on the eliminated contestants' "Stacks On" challenge (see below) for second-chance week.

Week 12 - Tiffany - Tiffany won the power of The Walk by winning the escalator challenge. There was a single vessel containing a briefcase. On the back, there was an instruction to move either bracelet to any bracelet-less contestant. Whoever had their bracelet taken away received the case. Tiffany chose to give herself Sammy's 'double' bracelet, and therefore give Sammy the case. Inside was a disc telling Sammy to eliminate any contestant. She had 1 hour to make her decision. Tiffany and Cameron told her to eliminate Sharif, since he was the bigger threat. Sammy went against this and chose to eliminate Stewart, because she felt Sharif deserved to stay there more.

==== Major Challenges ====
Week 1 - Bucket Loads of Trouble - One partner had to stand on a block while balancing a log on their shoulders with two 30-litre buckets attached to each end. The other partner had to run into the sea to gather water and pour it into any of the contestants' buckets. Once a contestant could not hold up their log or stay on their block any longer, them and their partner were eliminated from the challenge. After the challenge, despite Nathan & Andrew won, the other couples yelled at Jodi & Jeda for not eliminating Nathan & Andrew especially when they had a chance to do so earlier in the challenge. Jeda yelled at Cameron for yelling at the sidelines about an alliance with Nathan & Andrew. Then, Sammy got involved and told Jeda to "shut her mouth" defending Cameron and the other couples. At the house, Jodi told Jeda that there was no need for her to yell at Cameron or anyone and explained to her that they are now targets for having the couples believing that they are part of the alliance with Nathan & Andrew.

Week 2(a) - Race to Sydney Challenge - See above under "Warehouses or Challenges" section.

Week 2(b) - Brain Strain - The couples found a line of treadmills set up outside for their challenge. Ajay was going to ask them multiple choice questions about nutrition. One half of the couple was to answer the question and if they gave the wrong answer, the speed of the treadmill their partner was on would be raised by 1 km/h. The final three couples were Holly & Mel, Teresa & Sharif and Ben & Sean. In the end, Ben & Sean won the challenge and letters from home. Ajay then told the winning couple to select who will also receive letters from home. Ben & Sean decided that all of them deserved letters from home and in the end selected all the couples to have letters from home.

Week 3 - Struggle in the Sand Dunes - The winner of this challenge would have a 1 kg advantage at the next weigh-in. Holly and Amanda couldn’t compete because of injury and Sharif and Mel were still with the Commando. Only one half of each couple would be taking part in the challenge and Sammy was amazed when Cameron volunteered to compete on their behalf. It came down to Tiffany and Nathan. They had to carry 40 kg up the dune. Nathan won, but later came back down to help Tiffany, who was lagging behind showing how caring he was with his training group alliance member.

Week 4 - A Waterlogged Challenge - The contestants had to walk across a narrow beam suspended above a pool, pick up a 10 kg water balloon and carry it back over the beam to place it on a rack. They had 90 minutes to place as many balloons as they could on the rack. If a contestant fell off on the beam, they had to swim to the side they started from (whether that being the starting side or the water balloon side) and start again. Nathan managed to get 10 balloons to the other side, while the six couples could only manage to get one over. Despite losing, the six couples all had a dip in the pool and became best friends with each other.

Week 5 - Towers of Tuna - Each team had a stack of 10,000 tins of tuna (weighing a total of 1 tonne) that they had to move 50m and restack using nothing but their bare hands. 8,800 tins were in trays but the other 1,200 were loose tins. Whichever team's was completed and held up for 60 seconds first would win $10,000. Andrew was not able to run or carry tins due to his knee injury, so he was restricted to stacking tins. Holly and Mel won the challenge. Nathan tried to complete his stack anyway but collapsed due to muscle spasms in his back, though he recovered after getting medical attention.

Week 6 - Relay Race at Royal Randwick - For the first red team vs blue team challenge, the contestants were taken to Royal Randwick racecourse, and were to run a relay race around the 2.1 km track. Each member of each team would run a 420m leg, and the teams had to do 4 laps of the track in total. The fifth and final lap would then consist of the first runner picking up each successive member of the team to run together until the finish line. Teresa sat out due to an injury, and the red team chose Cameron to sit out to even the teams out. The trainers Shannon and Michelle would run with their team to encourage them along. The prize on offer was precious phone calls home. The lead passed between the teams over the course of the race but the blue team ended up winning.

Week 7 - Brain vs Brawn - A team challenge in which one person from each team answered multiple-choice questions (the "brain") while the rest of the team carried a heavy load (the "brawn"). Each team picked one person to be their "brain" (the red team chose Cameron; the blue team chose Teresa). The rest of the teams were the "brawn" (except for Julie, who was chosen by the blue team to sit out in order to even out the teams), and had to carry a metal disc between them. Ajay asked the "brains" multiple-choice questions, and the first person to buzz in would answer. If they answered incorrectly, a 10 kg weight was added to their team's disc, while if they answered correctly, a 10 kg weight would be added to the opposing team's disc. If neither "brain" buzzed in, both teams would receive a 10 kg weight. Whichever team dropped their disc first would lose the challenge. The prize on offer was the power to choose which member of the blue team would not be part of the next team weigh-in total (as the blue team had one more member than the red team at the time). In the end, the blue team accumulated 50 kg of extra weight while the red team accumulated 90 kg before dropping their disc. At the next weigh-in, the blue team chose Andrew to not count towards the weigh-in total.

Week 8 - Dirty Dash - This challenge took place in a mud-filled paddock of a length of 100m, with a low-hung cargo net in the middle. In each round, all contestants would race from one end of the paddock, going under the cargo net, to the other end, then around a flag pole and back under the cargo net to the start to pick up a finishing flag. There would be one less finishing flag than contestants, so whoever did not get a finishing flag would be out of the challenge. The next round would then start with the remaining contestants and one fewer finishing flag. Whichever team had all their members eliminated first would lose the challenge. The prize on offer was the power to choose which member of the blue team would not be part of the next team weigh-in total (as the blue team had one more member than the red team at the time). Because the blue team had one extra member, they chose Julie to sit out of the challenge. This was the first challenge after Andrew and Cameron had swapped teams, so they both wanted to prove themselves to their new teams. The contestants eliminated from the challenge were, in order: Cameron (blue), Sammy (red), Sharif (red), Tiffany (blue), Teresa (blue), Meaghan (red), Andrew (red). Sean won the challenge for the blue team. At the next weigh-in, the blue team chose Julie to not count towards the weigh-in total.

Week 9 - Hearts Racing - This challenge took place in the weigh-in room, with each contestant on a spin bike and hooked up to a heart rate monitor. The contestants would have to pedal and keep their heart rate at or above 80% of their maximum heart rate. If a contestant's heart rate dropped below 80% or they stopped pedalling, they were out of the challenge. Whoever was the last one remaining would win the challenge and immunity. The contestants dropped out in the following order: Andrew, Julie, Sean, Meaghan, Sammy, Cameron. Tiffany was the last one left and so won the challenge and immunity. Tiffany and Cameron had been pedalling for 2 hours and 20 minutes before Cameron dropped out.

Week 10 - New Zealand Super Challenge - This challenge, set along the Waikato River, would result in one contestant being eliminated. The super challenge would begin with a 4 km mountain bike race, ending at the Huka Falls. The next leg of the race would be 3 km on foot following the Waikato River. The contestants would then be faced with a fork in the road, where they would have to choose to either take the stairs down to the river, or bungy jump 47m. Before they could take the stairs, they would have to wait for a 30-minute penalty, but they could bungy jump immediately. This was their chance to put into practice what they had learnt earlier in the week about facing their fears. Once down at the river through either method, they would have to kayak for 1.5 km. From there, it was a 100m sprint to the finish line. At the finish line was one last challenge: there would be six food items, and the contestants would have to choose one when they arrive. Whoever had the item with the most calories would lose the challenge and be eliminated. When the bike leg started, Sean took off ahead, followed by Meaghan, Cameron, Tiffany, Sammy and then Julie in last place. Tiffany overtook Cameron during the bike leg, and later Cameron fell off his bike a couple of times. On the running leg, Sammy and later Julie overtook Cameron. Sean arrived at the fork in the road, and decided to bungy jump. Meaghan arrived at the fork and saw Sean bungy jump. Tiffany arrived at the fork while Meaghan was waiting, and bungy jumped ahead of her. Sammy arrived at the fork, and, to try to encourage Meaghan to jump, agreed to jump in tandem with her. However, Meaghan couldn't make herself jump, delaying both herself and Sammy. While she was hesitating, Julie and Cameron arrived and waited out their 30 minutes to take the stairs. Eventually, Meaghan pulled out of the bungy jump and took the stairs while Sammy jumped alone. Sean arrived at the finish line first and chose the Weet-Bix with skim milk as his food item. Tiffany arrived second and chose 125g of blueberries. Julie arrived in third place and chose 43g of potato chips. Cameron's kayak capsized but he still arrived at the finish line in fourth place and chose the ham, cheese and tomato sandwich. Meaghan felt guilty about delaying Sammy because of her own fears, and wanted to sacrifice herself for Sammy, choosing a worse food option than Sammy to protect her. However, they had difficulty deciding between the two options: 200g of spam or 1/2 a litre of full-cream milk. Eventually, Sammy chose the milk and Meaghan chose the spam. Finally, Ajay revealed the results. In order from lowest to highest calories, the food items were: 125g of blueberries (Tiffany, 71 calories); Weet-Bix with skim milk (Sean, 194 calories); 43g of potato chips (Julie, 232 calories); ham, cheese and tomato sandwich (Cameron, 285 calories); 1/2 a litre of full-cream milk (Sammy, 315 calories); 200g of spam (Meaghan, 616 calories). Meaghan was eliminated, but before she left she had to pass on the Nothing bracelet to another contestant. At this point in the game, the bracelet didn't offer much protection anymore, and none of the contestants minded having it as they weren't in the game for the money. Meaghan decided to give the bracelet to Cameron, as she felt that if one of the other contestants were to win, they would need the money more. Meaghan then left straightaway, taken away by helicopter.

Week 11(a) - Stacks On - This challenge was similar to the week 1 challenge "Bucket Loads of Trouble", and was played out between the eliminated contestants who had not yet received a "wildcard" white T-shirt or gone home. Amanda left before the challenge under doctor's orders due to her shoulder injury, so that left 9 contestants to participate in the challenge. In this challenge, each contestant was standing on a disc and carrying a barbell on their shoulders. In turn, each contestant would nominate another contestant to have 10 kg added to their barbell. The first contestant to drop their barbell or step off their disc would be eliminated. The last contestant standing would win a "wildcard" white T-shirt. The contestants dropped out in the following order: Tania (50 kg), Jeda (40 kg), Andrew (100 kg), Stewart (90 kg), Ramses (30 kg), Meaghan (40 kg), Sean (110 kg), Teresa (90 kg). Sharif was the last contestant standing, carrying 140 kg, and won the "wildcard" white T-shirt. Tania was eliminated for being the first to drop out.

Week 11(b) - "Escape from Cockatoo Island" Super Challenge - The challenge was the final chance for the eliminated contestants to win a "wildcard" white T-shirt. Set on Cockatoo Island, it was played out between the 7 eliminated contestants who had not yet received a "wildcard" white T-shirt or gone home. The challenge took the form of a race with a convict theme due to Cockatoo Island's past as a convict prison. The contestants each started with a 10 kg ball and chain attached to their ankles, and they had to run 500m up a hill carrying the ball and chain. At the top of the hill was a question 2 answer choices. If they answered incorrectly, they would have to run back down to the start and then run back up again. If they answered correctly, they would have to sort through a set of keys to find the correct key to remove their ball and chain. They would then do 3 laps of the island, arriving back at the hill each time to answer a new question. Each time they got a question wrong, they would have to run back down to the starting line and then back up again. After completing their laps, they would have to complete a strength challenge of moving 7 bags of 20 kg of grain a distance of 75m. Once they had moved all their bags, they would open a box and smash open a bottle to find a message describing how to get to the yacht that was the finishing line (they would have to row there). The first two contestants to finish the race would win the "wildcard" white T-shirts, and the rest would be eliminated. Ultimately, Sean came first and Stewart came second, so the two of them won the "wildcard" white T-shirts while the other 5 were eliminated.

Week 12(a) - Escalator Challenge - This was the final challenge, and was played in the place of Temptation, so that the reward for winning the challenge could be the power of the final Walk. The 5 contestants were taken to Westfield Burwood. The challenge was to take place on one of the escalators in the shopping centre. The contestants would each stand in a spot along the escalator, separated by barriers between them. When the challenge started, the escalator would move down while the contestants would have to walk up, so that they stay between the barriers in front of and behind them. If a contestant moved through the barrier behind them, they would be out of the challenge. The last contestant standing would win the challenge and the power of The Walk. The contestants were placed with Tiffany at the top, followed by Stewart, Sharif, Sammy, and then Cameron. Cameron dropped out first, then Sammy dropped out soon afterwards. Sharif accidentally went through the barrier when he turned around to see how close he was to it. Stewart and Tiffany were going strong but the other 3 contestants were cheering for Tiffany and not Stewart, as they wanted Tiffany to win. Finally Stewart conceded to Tiffany, being mentally fatigued. Tiffany won the challenge, having walked up the escalator for 32 minutes.

Week 12(b) - The Biggest Loser Cook-Off - This challenge was set by the trainers (Shannon and Michelle) to see how much the contestants had learnt about healthy cooking. Each contestant had 45 minutes to prepare an entrée, a main and a dessert. Each course had to include at least one of the three base ingredients: blueberries, chicken and bok choy. Shannon and Michelle would be the judges, and judge each dish on presentation and taste. The winner of the challenge would win a $4500 Everdure barbecue. Sammy presented her courses first: grilled eggplant with mushroom, cottage cheese and bok choy for entrée; stir-fried snow peas, carrot, mushroom, onion, garlic and chilli with Worcestershire and soy sauces for the main course; and carb-smart ice cream with berries and vanilla essence for dessert. Tiffany was next and presented: grilled capsicum and garlic bok choy tapas with cottage cheese for entrée; mustard chicken on a bed of lime and lemon greens for main course; and vanilla blueberries and yoghurt for dessert. Cameron then served his courses: cajun chicken and mushroom for entrée; stir-fried chicken with bok choy, cabbage, onion, carrots, capsicum, with worcestershire sauce for main course; and blueberries with yoghurt and light chocolate syrup for dessert. Sharif was the favourite to win the competition, being the best chef in the house. He first presented his entrée, baby spinach salad with cottage cheese and balsamic dressing (containing red, yellow and green capsicum, Spanish onion and cherry tomatoes), but unfortunately he forgot to put bok choy in the dish. He then presented the main course: wilted bok choy with stir-fried chicken, chilli, garlic and ginger plus a squeeze of lemon. His dessert was a punnet of blueberries with 100g of cottage cheese and a raspberry cooler on top. The judges awarded one point each to a contestant that they felt had the best dish within each course. Sammy got both points for the entrée. Tiffany got both points for the main course. For the dessert, Shannon gave a point to Tiffany and Michelle gave a point to Sharif. Therefore, Tiffany won the challenge and the barbecue with 3 points. Shannon and Michelle also awarded the Coach's Encouragement Award to Cameron because he has improved so much.

Week	Challenge Name	Prize	Penalty	Winner	Loser
1	Bucket Loads of Trouble	3 kg Advantage	No Penalty	Andrew & Nathan	
2(a)	Race to Sydney Challenge	Immunity	2 kg Disadvantage	Andrew & Nathan	Meaghan & Julie
2(b)	Brain Strain	Letters from home	No Penalty	Ben & Sean	
3	Struggle in the Sand Dunes	1 kg Advantage	No Penalty	Nathan	
4	A Waterlogged Challenge	No Reward	No access to gym, exercise equipment or trainers until weigh-in.	Andrew & Nathan	Other 6 couples
5	Towers of Tuna	$10,000	No Penalty	Holly & Mel	
6	Relay Race at Royal Randwick	Phone calls home	No Penalty	Blue Team	Red Team
7	Brain vs Brawn	Power to choose which member of the blue team would not be part of the next team weigh-in total	No Penalty	Blue Team	Red Team
8	Dirty Dash	Power to choose which member of the blue team would not be part of the next team weigh-in total	No Penalty	Blue Team	Red Team
9	Hearts Racing	Immunity	No Penalty	Tiffany	
10	New Zealand Super Challenge	No Reward	Elimination	Tiffany (least calories), Sean (finished race first)	Meaghan
11(a)	Stacks On	"Wildcard" white T-shirt	Elimination	Sharif	Tania
11(b)	"Escape from Cockatoo Island" Super Challenge	"Wildcard" white T-shirt (for 1st and 2nd place)	Elimination	Sean (finished 1st)	Other 5 remaining eliminated contestants
11(b)	"Escape from Cockatoo Island" Super Challenge	"Wildcard" white T-shirt (for 1st and 2nd place)	Elimination	Stewart (finished 2nd)	Other 5 remaining eliminated contestants
12(a)	Escalator Challenge	Power of "The Walk"	No Penalty	Tiffany	
12(b)	The Biggest Loser Cook-Off	Barbecue (valued at $4500)	No Penalty	Tiffany	

==== Emazon ====
Holly and Mel were given the disk of pain in week 4 by Sharif & Teresa and this resulted in the first interaction between Emazon and any contestants. Holly and Mel were blindfolded and led to a cage, where Mel was locked outside and Holly locked inside with Emazon. Holly had to follow Emazon's training directions, high-demand boxing training, while Mel was forced to move large numbers of items, including tractor tyres and barrels, to be able to claim the key and end Holly's pain. Also, Mel was not allow to roll the barrels or tyres as it would defeat the purpose. During the challenge, Holly managed the session with Emazon very well by using her anger against Sharif & Teresa for the boxing session. However, Mel had a hard time moving the items from one end to the other. When Mel was on her last tyre, she nearly gave up, but Holly told her "I believe in you!" and Mel managed to move the last tyre, grab the key and free Holly from the cage. Afterwards they were told by Emazon that if they said anything about her to anyone else, "all of the work you have done here will be lost".

In week 7, since Sean was the Biggest Loser for the week (after Amanda was eliminated), Sean chose the "Dine In" warehouse option for his Blue team, leaving the Red team with the "Dine Out" warehouse option. For the "Dine Out" option, all the members of the Red team (Cameron, Meaghan, Nathan, Sammy and Sharif) met Emazon for the first time. Before they started Emazon's challenge, they were first shown a video of Holly and Mel's time with Emazon (since Holly and Mel weren't allowed to talk about Emazon on their return). After that, each member had to face Emazon one-on-one while the rest of the members had to do a circuit, in order to end the one-on-one session with Emazon. Should the individual succeed, they would be able to choose a food group as staple food for the week. After the session, all five members earned their food and Emazon once again told them all not to reveal her identity or their time with her.

In week 11, while the eliminated contestants had returned and were competing for a chance to get back in the competition, the final four contestants (Cameron, Julie, Sammy and Tiffany) received a note that said they have a present waiting for them. Before that, the final four contestants had not been happy that the eliminated contestants had returned and two would be returning to the competition. Cameron was especially unhappy that the eliminated contestants had had a chance to win prizes through a Temptation while the final four had not. As soon as this message was revealed, Cameron felt emotional and silly for making these remarks earlier. But when they got in the car, they arrived at an unpleasant place and knew that this wasn't the present they were expecting. Julie cried when she saw the arena and feared getting bashed up. But this was Cameron and Sammy's second encounter with Emazon and they knew what to expect. In Emazon's session, each contestant was to fight off their anger and frustration against the eliminated contestants and fight for their places in the finals knowing that these people will not steal their places in the finale. After the session, all the contestants bonded together to try to keep each other in the final four and not let the latest twists affect them in any way.

==== Eliminations ====
Teams have to participate in the elimination if they have the lowest percentage of weight loss at the previous weigh-in. Contestants must vote strategically to stay in the game and eliminate another contestant by a majority vote. If the vote is tied it's considered a "hung vote"; the couple with the lowest percentage of weight loss will be eliminated. (In the event of a tie during the Red vs. Blue portion, the other team will have the deciding vote, and they may vote for anyone they choose, not just for the ones up in the tie.)

- Week 1 (Tania and Ramses) 4-1 : Couples voted to eliminate Tania and Ramses because of Ramses' back injury and they believed it would benefit them. Also, they kept Holly & Melanie as they believed to be the weakest team and don't believe they will be the Biggest Losers and the fear of Holly giving her double bracelet to someone and possibly become a target of elimination. Despite being voted off, Tania told the whole room that at the finale, she'll be a force to be reckon with and become "a hot couple".
- Week 2 (Jodi & Jeda) 5-2 : Couples voted to eliminate Jodi & Jeda due to their attitude towards other teams and to weaken Nathan & Andrew's very first alliance. Nathan & Andrew believed that they had Holly & Melanie's double vote thinking they too would vote off Julie & Meaghan. However, Holly & Melanie decided to vote off Jodi & Jeda as they liked Meaghan & Julie more and that Jodi & Jeda commented that they were too immature to make decisions. Some couples feared that if they vote off Meaghan & Julie, the nothing bracelet would be given to them and believe they are a lesser threat than Jodi & Jeda. After the vote, Nathan & Andrew complained to Holly & Melanie that they had a deal and that their plans didn't work out. Holly & Mel countered saying that it's a game and they too were playing it as well. Jodi & Jeda were shocked at every couple who voted against them saying to Holly & Melanie that they didn't vote them last week and to Sharif & Teresa and Ben & Sean for voting them. Sharif countered saying that Julie deserved to stay and that she needed more help than them.
- Week 3 (Amanda & Stewart) 3-3 : Couples voted to eliminate Amanda & Stewart because some of them see them as a bigger threat than Holly & Melanie. Stewart pointed out to Ajay and the rest that this day was his and Amanda's anniversary. Nathan & Andrew had the deciding vote either to vote for revenge against Holly & Mel for messing up their plans from last week, or to vote out a threat in the game. They chose to vote Amanda & Stewart for being the bigger threat and to vote for loyalty between the training groups. Since the votes were tied, Amanda & Stewart were eliminated for having the lowest percentage weight loss of the week. After the votes, Amanda said to Sammy, "So much for never voting for me, Sammy". Sammy replied with, "Don’t you dare say that to me".
- Week 3 (Nathan & Andrew) 4-2-1 : Couples had to vote again in one hour of potentially eliminating another couple. Nathan & Andrew and Cameron & Sammy voted for Ben & Sean for seeing them as a threat and keeping with training group alliance. Holly & Melanie voted for Sharif & Teresa for avoiding any further backstabbing against Nathan & Andrew, being friends with Ben & Sean and voting their threat stating that they were voting for training groups. But it was Ben & Sean, Bob & Tiffany, Meaghan & Julie, and Sharif & Teresa who all voted for Nathan & Andrew for being the biggest threat of them all. Although Nathan & Andrew received the most votes, they weren't going home. Instead, it was "all versus one" week (exactly the same in the US series of Biggest Loser: Couples in week 4). Should Nathan & Andrew's percentage weight loss for next week be lower than the average weight loss of the other couples, they will be eliminated. Otherwise, Nathan & Andrew will have the right to vote off any couple they wish. Note, all couples swapped places sitting and standing, only Bob sat and Tiffany stood in both eliminations.
- Week 4 (Ben & Sean) 1-0 : As a result of the fact that Nathan and Andrew lost a higher percentage of weight than the six other couples, they were the only team casting a vote in this elimination. Ben and Sean were seen as large threats, especially after being that week's biggest losers, which was the reason Nathan and Andrew gave for choosing to eliminate them.
- Week 5 (Holly & Mel) 3-0 : They asked and pleaded to be voted out. They got their wish and became the fifth couple eliminated from Camp Biggest Loser.
- Week 6 (Amanda) 4-1 : Members of the red team decided to vote off Amanda. Originally, there was the possibility of a 3-3 hung vote due to training alliances. Former members of Shannan's training group (Meaghan, Sharif and Amanda) wanted to vote off Cameron for being the weakest link and to strengthen the red team, while the former members of Michelle's training group (Nathan, Sammy and Cameron) wanted to vote off Amanda for being really negative towards other members of the group, especially towards them. Meaghan thought she could swing Nathan's vote against Cameron but Nathan stood his ground, stating that he would prefer a hung vote than vote against Cameron. The deciding votes were Meaghan and Sharif's, who although they weren't being voted for by their own team, would be threatened if the blue team had the deciding vote in a hung vote. In the end, the team didn't want it to end in a 3-3 hung vote and give the power of elimination to the blue team, so they all voted off Amanda. Amanda wasn't surprised and knew that all of them were playing the game, but felt betrayed by Sharif, whom she thought would at least try to keep her.
- Week 7 (Nathan) 3-2 : Nathan offered to be eliminated instead of Cameron to keep Cameron in the house for longer, although this could have been to give himself a graceful exit as Nathan felt like he was going to get outvoted anyway. The deciding vote was Meaghan's, who felt that her alliance with Sammy and Cameron would protect her, sacrificing Nathan from the team even though he was their strongest member.
- Week 7 (Bob) Nathan's choice : As the eliminated contestant, Nathan was given the power to choose another contestant to be eliminated with him. He chose Bob. However, Nathan and Bob later found out that they were not out of the game yet, but instead were to be trained in secret by The Commando on Fitzroy Island.
- Week 8 (Teresa) 3-2 : The decision of whom to eliminate from the blue team came down to Teresa or Tiffany, because both of them have similar strengths. The deciding vote was Julie's, who voted for Teresa because she had made a promise to Bob to look after Tiffany. Teresa understood the decision. Before she left, Teresa had to choose who to give the double bracelet to; she chose to give the bracelet to Sammy, because she deserved it and wasn't in it for the money, and so Teresa asked Cameron to forward it on to Sammy.
- Week 9 (Sharif) Walk : Meaghan made the decision, as a result of "The Walk" to eliminate Sharif because he was one of the threats in the house.
- Week 9 (Andrew) 3-1 : This was the first Elimination for the contestants as individuals. Sean and Andrew were below the yellow line. They were the two biggest threats in the competition, and the only two contestants remaining that weren't part of the alliance, so this was a great opportunity for the alliance, but also a very difficult decision. The two were very similar in a lot of ways. Tiffany voted for Andrew because he was more likely to remain above the yellow line in the future, so that they wouldn't have another chance to eliminate him. Sammy voted for Andrew to keep herself in the game for longer. Meaghan voted for Sean because she had made a promise to Andrew to not vote for him. For Julie, the decision was most difficult because she greatly appreciated the support and encouragement she has gained from both boys. She decided to vote for Andrew and keep Sean, because Sean had previously passed on his biggest loser prize to Julie when he was eliminated in Week 4 (so that Julie got to see her family for a day), and that had made the biggest impact on her journey so far. Cameron's vote was not seen, but it was likely that he also voted for Andrew as he saw him as the bigger threat, having the potential to lose more weight. Andrew left, appreciative of the experiences and journey he'd had with the other contestants.
- Week 10 (Meaghan) Super Challenge : Meaghan was eliminated due to the Super Challenge in which contestants had to race through a tough track. At one point in the race there was a choice to be made: either bungy jump, or take the stairs with a 30-minute penalty. Meaghan wanted to bungy jump but hesitated and suggested jumping in tandem with Sammy. However, Meaghan continued to hesitate and this delayed both herself and Sammy. Meaghan finally said she couldn’t overcome her fear and do the bungy jump with Sammy. Sammy and Meaghan crossed the finish line together arm-in-arm. At the end was a choice of food items, and whoever had the one with the highest amount of calories would be eliminated. Meaghan wanted to choose the one with the higher amount of calories to protect Sammy, as she felt guilty for delaying her. The girls asked the others which dish they thought had the most calories but nobody was sure. Sammy chose the milk and Meaghan had the spam. The dish with the most calories was the spam with 616 calories and Meaghan was eliminated from the Biggest Loser. Before she had to go Meaghan had to decide to give the Nothing bracelet to somebody. So she decided that Cameron should have it as she felt that if one of the other contestants were to win, they would need the money more. Meaghan then left straightaway, taken away by helicopter.
- Week 10 (Sean) 2-0 : Sean and Cameron were below the yellow line, putting their fate in the hands of the three girls, Julie, Tiffany and Sammy. Cameron stated that he would be happy to go home, satisfied in what he had accomplished. Sammy wanted her dad to stay to keep learning more, and would definitely vote to keep her dad in the game. Julie and Tiffany were undecided, being friends with both boys and seeing both as threats. In the end, both Julie and Tiffany voted for Sean, seeing him as the bigger threat.
- Week 11 (Julie) 2-0 : Julie and Sammy were below the yellow line, Julie was sad to see two girls (herself and Sammy) under the yellow line. With Sammy being under the yellow line the doublet bracelet was up for grabs. Julie knew that even if there was a hung vote at elimination with two votes for her and two votes for Sammy, she would be going home because her weight loss percentage was the lowest. Sharif and Stewart spoke, observing that Sammy is the bigger threat of the two and that she also has the double bracelet. Stewart felt that the double bracelet needed to change hands to make the dynamics of the final five more interesting. Tiffany was torn between voting with her head and voting with her heart to keep Sammy in the game because of their friendship. Julie told Tiffany that Tiffany would be right in line for the double bracelet if Sammy was eliminated and that if Tiffany votes with her head, she should eliminate Sammy. At elimination, Cameron revealed his vote first and cried as he voted for Julie, saying he didn’t want to do it. Tiffany was also upset, saying Tiffany and Julie were her best friends and she desperately wanted both of them to stay in the competition. Tiffany voted for Julie, saying she hoped a mother would understand. Julie said she did. Since she had the lowest weight loss percentage, Julie was then eliminated and Sharif and Stewart didn’t have to reveal their votes. Julie said she was sad but was also going home proud of herself. Sammy and Tiffany said how much they loved Julie and she hugged them all goodbye. Julie told Tiffany her vote was going to be important since Cameron wouldn’t vote for his own daughter.
- Week 12 (Stewart) Walk : Sammy was granted the power to eliminate any contestant after Tiffany took the Walk. It was down to Sharif or Stewart, as she would not vote out Cameron or Tiffany. Although Sharif was considered the bigger threat, Sammy chose to vote with her heart, sending Stewart home.
- Week 12 (Cameron) 1-0: For the first time, both contestants below the yellow line are from the same couple, Cameron and Sammy (red couple). Cameron intentionally wanted to be below the yellow line in order to have Sammy to be in the final three. Sharif and Tiffany had to decide whether to vote from their heads or to vote from their hearts. Both knew that Sammy had a chance of winning considering she still has weight to lose but her percentage weight loss isn't that easy to lose. As for Cameron, he still has weight to lose and potentially lose the most weight based on percentage. Sharif also knew that should Cameron be voted off, he would receive the nothing bracelet. In the end, Sharif voted from his heart and respected Cameron's sacrifice as Sharif did it for the weight loss and not for the money so he voted for Cameron. Since Cameron was holding the nothing bracelet, Cameron had to either give it to Sammy or Sharif since Tiffany is currently holding the double bracelet and can't hold both of them. So Cameron gave the bracelet to Sharif in the end.

Contestant	Wk 1	Wk 2	Wk 3	Wk 4		Wk 5	Wk 6	Wk 7	Wk 8	Wk 9	Wk 10	Wk 11	Wk 12
Eliminated	Tania & Ramses	Jodi & Jeda	Stewart & Amanda	(Nathan & Andrew)^{3}	Ben & Sean^{4}	Holly & Mel	Amanda	Nathan, Bob^{5}	Teresa	Sharif^{6}, Andrew	Meaghan^{7}, Sean	Julie	Stewart^{8}, Cameron
Bob	?	?	Stewart & Amanda	Nathan & Andrew	X	Holly & Mel	X	X	Training with the Commando				Finalist
Tiffany	?	?	Stewart & Amanda	Nathan & Andrew	X	Holly & Mel	X	X	Teresa	Andrew	Sean	Julie	?
Sharif	Tania & Ramses	Jodi & Jeda	Holly & Mel	Nathan & Andrew	X	?	Amanda	Cameron	X	X	Eliminated Wk 9 via The Walk, Returned Wk 11	?	Cameron
Sammy	Holly & Mel	Jodi & Jeda	Stewart & Amanda	Sean & Ben	X	Holly & Mel	Amanda	Nathan	X	Andrew	?	X	X
Nathan	Tania & Ramses	Julie & Meaghan	Stewart & Amanda	Sean & Ben	Ben & Sean	?	?	Cameron	Training with the Commando				Eliminated Wk 12 - Lost out on Final 4 spot
Cameron	Holly & Mel	Jodi & Jeda	Stewart & Amanda	Sean & Ben	X	Holly & Mel	Amanda	Nathan	Teresa	?	X	Julie	Eliminated Wk 12
Stewart	Tania & Ramses	Julie & Meaghan	X	Eliminated Wk 3, Returned Wk 11								?	Re-Eliminated Wk 12 via The Walk
Julie	?	X	Holly & Mel	Nathan & Andrew	X	X	X	X	Teresa	Andrew	Sean	X	Eliminated Wk 11
Sean	?	Jodi & Jeda	Holly & Mel	Nathan & Andrew	X	Holly & Mel	X	X	Tiffany	X	X	Re-Eliminated^{3} Wk 10	
Meaghan	?	X	Holly & Mel	Nathan & Andrew	X	X	Amanda	Nathan	X	Sean	X	Eliminated via Challenge Penalty Wk 10	
Andrew	Tania & Ramses	Julie & Meaghan	Stewart & Amanda	Sean & Ben	Ben & Sean	?	X	X	X	X	Eliminated Wk 9		
Teresa	Tania & Ramses	Jodi & Jeda	Holly & Mel	Nathan & Andrew	X	?	X	X	Tiffany	Eliminated Wk 8			
Amanda	Tania & Ramses	Julie & Meaghan	X	Eliminated Wk 3, Returned Wk 5		Holly & Mel	Cameron	Re-Eliminated Wk 6					
Holly	X	Jodi & Jeda	X	Teresa & Sharif	X	X	Eliminated Wk 5						
Mel	X	Jodi & Jeda	X	Teresa & Sharif	X	X	Eliminated Wk 5						
Ben	?	Jodi & Jeda	Holly & Mel	Nathan & Andrew	X	Eliminated Wk 4							
Jodi	Tania & Ramses	X	Eliminated Wk 2										
Jeda	Tania & Ramses	X	Eliminated Wk 2										
Tania	X	Eliminated Wk 1											
Ramses	X	Eliminated Wk 1											

- Immunity
- ? Won immunity, vote not revealed (hidden vote)
- X Won immunity, was below yellow line or not in elimination, unable to vote
- X Below yellow line, not allowed to vote
- X Not in elimination, unable to vote
- ? Vote not revealed (hidden vote)
- Valid vote cast
- Double vote cast
- Eliminated or not in house
- X Eliminated via penalty or quit before an official elimination (excluding money offers)
- Last person eliminated before the finale

^Note 3: Nathan and Andrew received the most votes, but were surprised to find out that they would not be going home.

^Note 4: Sean was eliminated in Week 4, but returned in Week 5 paired with Amanda as the "odd couple".

^Note 5: Nathan was eliminated by votes, but was given the power to choose someone else to be eliminated with him. He chose Bob. However, the two of them later found out that they were not eliminated completely, and instead were to train with The Commando on Fitzroy Island.

^Note 6: Sharif was eliminated by Meaghan as part of The Walk.

^Note 7: Meaghan was eliminated for losing the Super Challenge.

^Note 8: Stewart was eliminated by Sammy as part of The Walk

==== Finale ====
The finale aired on Monday 27 April, in a two-hour special at 8:30pm on Channel Ten. The last episode before this was a normal half-hour episode at 7:00pm on the same day.

Bob Herdsman was crowned the 2009 Biggest Loser, having lost 87.6 kg, or 52.21% of his body weight, winning him the $200,000 grand prize. His results were a record for most kilos and highest body percentage lost in the show's history. He is also the oldest contestant to win the show in any version of The Biggest Loser.

Tiffany finished in second place and won $30,000, Sharif finished in third place and won $20,000, and Sammy finished in fourth place and won $10,000.

Of the 16 eliminated contestants, Sean lost the most weight, having lost 47.7 kg or 36% of his body weight. For this feat, he was awarded $30,000.

The winners of the second-chance contest (10 couples that auditioned for the show but didn't make it in, who trained on the outside and participated in The Biggest Loser Club) were also announced: they were friends Ben and Katie, who had lost a combined total of 78.5 kg, which was the highest percentage out of the 10 second-chance couples, and so they won $10,000.

===== Eliminated Contestants' Weigh-In Results =====
Contestant	Starting Weight (kg)	Final Weight (kg)	Weight Lost (kg)	Percentage Lost	Position (out of Eliminated Contestants)
Sean	132.5	84.8	47.7	36.00%	1st
Ben	153.1	98.2	54.9	35.86%	2nd
Stewart	136.4	88.0	48.4	35.48%	3rd
Julie	123.4	79.8	43.6	35.33%	4th
Cameron	164.1	107.5	56.6	34.49%	5th
Teresa	115.0	76.0	39.0	33.91%	6th
Amanda	170.4	113.6	56.8	33.33%	7th
Meaghan	109.6	73.2	36.4	33.21%	8th
Nathan	145.2	98.3	46.9	32.30%	9th
Andrew	144.2	99.5	44.7	31.00%	10th
Jodi	121.5	87.5	34.0	27.98%	11th
Holly	108.2	82.3	25.9	23.94%	12th
Mel	102.0	80.3	21.7	21.27%	13th
Ramses	137.9	109.4	28.5	20.67%	14th
Jeda	106.3	85.0	21.3	20.04%	15th
Tania	135.7	117.2	18.5	13.63%	16th

===== Finalists' Weigh-In Results =====
Contestant	Starting Weight (kg)	Final Weight (kg)	Weight Lost (kg)	Percentage Lost	Position
Bob	167.8	80.2	87.6	52.21%	The Biggest Loser
Tiffany	113.6	59.5	54.1	47.62%	Runner up
Sharif	178.3	105.8	72.5	40.66%	3rd Place
Sammy	118.6	72.5	46.1	38.87%	4th Place

== Production and release ==
=== Filming locations & dates ===
In all previous seasons filming was "The White House" in Sydney, New South Wales. Due to a large number of complaints, the former Warringah Council rejected Fremantle's request to use this property for season 4. The first week of the season was set at Hunt Resort on Fitzroy Island off the coast of Far North Queensland, as was Nathan and Bob's training with The Commando from week 8. The new Biggest Loser Sydney base (called "Camp Biggest Loser") is the former School of Artillery at the North Head Sanctuary near Manly.

=== Air dates and channels ===
The program premiered on 1 February 2009 on Network TEN.

In the promos, Christina Aguilera's "Fighter" was played as the theme for the commercials before the premiere. In this song, the chorus is played but one line (Made my skin a little bit thicker) was removed as it was deemed inappropriate for the basis of the show.

== Reception and public response ==
=== Television viewing and ratings ===
The fourth season started off with a successful peak of 1.7 million viewers and averaging 1.2 million over the premiere episode. This was up against sports programs expected to have high viewing audiences.
