= The Biggest Loser Australia season 3 =

The Biggest Loser Australia
- Season 3
- Starring: Michelle Bridges; Shannan Ponton; Jillian Michaels; Bob Harper
- Presented by: Ajay Rochester
- No. of episodes: 74

Release
- Original network: Network Ten
- Original release: 3 February – 1 May 2008

Season chronology
- ← Previous; Season 2

The third season of the Australian version of the original NBC American reality television series The Biggest Loser premiered on 3 February 2008 on Network Ten, and was screened for 6 nights a week over 12 weeks. It was won by Sam Rouen on the finale broadcast on 1 May 2008

Host Ajay Rochester and trainers of the previous season, Shannan Ponton and Michelle Bridges returned to this season of the show, as did US trainers Bob Harper and Jillian Michaels, and part-time trainer The Commando (Steve Willis).

Applications opened at the end of the previous season with over 6,000 people applying and primary photography was shot between October 2007 and February 2008. As with the two preceding series of The Biggest Loser, the winner titled "Australia's Biggest Loser" was eligible to win $200,000.

New elements to this season included "The Warehouse", where contestants choose their diet for a week, and a rival team of contestants trained separate from the main contestants in the United States. The season started with 30 contestants, of which 19 were selected to compete for the main prize (15 for the white house, and 4 for a secret black team).

== Season Overview ==
=== Game variations ===
- Black team: Of the unsuccessful 15 remaining contestants, 4 were selected by the Commando to become the new black team to be flown to USA and be trained by Bob and Jillian with the added benefit of having no temptations or challenges. Contestants were weighed in at the Biggest Loser campus where earlier US seasons of the Biggest Loser in the USA were filmed. The contestants in the black team are Michelle, Carrianne, Bryce and Steven. Steven quit in week 3 because he felt too homesick for his daughter, he was replaced by JJ, the second eliminated contestant.
- The Warehouse: An addition to this season is a dark room with contestants being given the choice of two or three types of foods to have as their diet for the week with contestants having to use their knowledge of food to make the best decision. Except for the first week, in which everyone decided on one or the other for all contestants, the biggest loser of the week would choose the two or three options for the teams.
- Hidden camera in the kitchen: In week 5, the trainers and their teams got a package that contained two DVDs stating "Red/Blue Team in Action." It turns out that for the past four weeks, a hidden camera was placed in the kitchen, watching the contestants go to the refrigerators and pantries. There were two refrigerators and two pantries in the kitchen, one of each for the blue team and one of each for the red team. The red team was up first, and showed Sam (a former blue team member who would later return to the blue team) stealing chocolate topping, Cosi stealing ice cream, and Garry taking out a half-dozen soda cans, all from the blue team's refrigerator and pantry. The Blue team was up next, and showed Michael taking kangaroo meat out of the red fridge, and then shows Kirsten stealing cheese to make a toasted cheese sandwich for herself and Alison. There were only two slices left, so she took them for herself and put the empty pack back in the fridge. Alison then came in looking for more ingredients, Kirsten showed what she did, and Alison was horrified. Finally, Michael is shown looking around, trying to figure out where the camera was (although how he knew that there was a camera there is unknown). All contestants are allowed to order in any food to have in addition to the food that the Warehouse picks for them, and they can order anything they want, so if one contestant in the house orders any junk food, everyone in the house would be faced with a real-life temptation. After watching the videos, Michelle threatened her team, saying that if anyone on her team is caught eating ice cream again, they will get a punishment that they don't want to know about.
- Mid game prize money: With half the contestants remaining in the game, the walk revealed a game twist where the contestant with the most weight loss for the week had the chance of winning $50,000 with the condition that they must leave the game. This amount was to be taken from the total prize pool of $200,000. It happened later when there were only five contestants left. Every contestant was offered this opportunity, the amount of cash being the same percentage of $100,000 that the percentage of each contestant's starting weight that they had lost to that point in the game. The first contestant to accept their own amount would leave the game, the others would not.

=== Team arrangements ===
- White team: All 30 contestants were competing as individuals until 15 were selected to be in a temporary White team. Twelve eliminated contestants also returned wearing white shirts toward the end of the game. The Final four wore black shirts at the time.
- Teams: The 3 main teams are Black, Red and Blue. Black was the first team to be formed with 4 contestants chosen by the Commando to have a second chance and train with Bob and Jillian in the US as part of a surprise twist. 14 out of the 15 contestants in the White group were dissolved into Red and Blue teams chosen by Sam (Blue) and Cosi (Red) as a reward for winning the first major challenge. Monica was the only contestant eliminated as a white team member because the two teams needed to start out even.

=== Game elements ===
The episodes and elements of the show are screened on a weekly rotation in the following set up:

- Sunday: Conclusion of the Major Challenge, Last Chance Training and Weigh-In
- Monday: Elimination
- Tuesday: The Warehouse
- Wednesday: Temptation
- Thursday: The Walk
- Friday: Major Challenge

==== The Weigh-Ins ====
At the beginning of the season and beginning of each week, contestants are weighed and compared to their previous weight. When the contestants are in "teams", their total weight losses are combined for a combined weight loss percentage. The team with the lowest weight loss percentage face elimination. When the game shifts to "singles", the two players with the lowest weight loss percentages are eligible for elimination. After the finalists are decided, they go home for a certain amount of time to continue their diets at home until the live finale where they are weighed in one last time and the winner, the "Biggest Loser", is crowned. The contestant's weekly results can be seen below, and are listed in chronological order of elimination, with the exception of the finalists, whose results are listed in order of their position on the leaderboard.

Contestant
Age
Starting

BMI

Ending

BMI

Starting

weight

Week

Kilograms

Lost

Percentage

Loss

1
2
3
4
5
6
7
8
9
10
11
12
Finale

Sam
19
47.7
25.6
154.6
143.7
136.7
135.7
127.9
121.9
119.2
116
111.5
108.8
103.3
100.0
97.8
82.9
71.7
46.48%
Alison
34
43.6
23.8
121.7
114.9
112.3
110.8
103.6
97.8
95.0
91.6
89.7
87.9
83.4
79.9
79.3
66.5
55.2
45.35%
Kirsten
32
40.0
22.7
126.8
120.8
116.0
113.1
105.4
100.1
97.3
93.4
90.6
88.9
84.1
82.2
81.5
71.9
54.9
43.30%
Garry
32
48.1
31.6
206.2
197.5
191.7
184.4
177.1
168.7
165.0
158.9
153.6
155.1
147.0
141.4
140.1
135.3
70.9
34.38%
Bryce
24
40.2
25.1
139.2
130.3
127.5
125.2
121.1
115.2
109.5
107.2
101.5
100.1
97.8
93.7
LEFT
87
52.2
37.50%
Michelle
20
40.3
29.9
120.7
116.1
114.6
113.0
110.7
105.0
101.8
100.4
98.9
96.6
94.0
93.9

89.7
31.0
25.68%
Phil
52
44.9
30.00
130.7

44.9
130.7
130.7
130.7
887.6

Cosi
28
41.1
28.7
140.8
131.3
129.4
122.4
116.5
109.2
107.8
102.2
98.9
96.2
91.5

98.2
42.6
30.25%
Nicola
21
39.0
28.2
112.6
108.6
105.4
101.6
97.6
92.5
92.2
88.2
87.3

84.5

81.6
31.0
27.53%
Matthew
25
39.9
27.9

39.9
37.9
35.9
32.6
27.9

27.9

Carrianne
23
40.8
29.8
111.0
105.9
104.7
102.5
99.4
97.3
95.1
92.2

90.2

81.2
29.8
26.84%
JJ
33
37.6
X
131.6
127.9

119.1
116.8
LEFT

X

X
X
X
Nicole
23
47.2
34.4
136.3
131.1
130.2
124.9
121.7
116.3
114.6

108.4

99.4
36.9
27.07%
Michael
25
48.5
34.3
175.0
167.1
160.5
156.7
148.9
142.6

131.9

124
51.0
29.14%
Mandi
35
43.9
32.1
188.7

John
44
44.9
31.3
150.3
139.7
133.2
130.7
124.8
LEFT

X

104.7
45.6
30.33%
Sheridan
26
41.6
26.1
120.1
115.4
112.7
107.3
103.4

84.7

75.3
44.8
37.30%
Sean
45
50.5
27.4
174.6
162.0
155.7
152.3
LEFT

115.3

94.8
79.8
45.70%
Debbie
39
46.8
31.9
135.2
129.5
125.4
123.0

103.2

92.1
43.1
31.78%
Steven
29
49.2
39.4
166.6
158.3
155.1
154.6

X

133.5
33.1
19.86%
Rachel
20
42.6
36.4
134.7
131.7
128.0

120.5

115.1
19.6
14.55%
Monica
20
X
X
116.8
LEFT

Did not attend
96.8

Teams

- Member of Shannon's Team
- Member of Michelle's Team

Winners

- Winner (among finalists)
- Winner (among eliminated)
- Last person eliminated before finale
- Results from Eliminated Players' Weigh In (Ep 63)
- Below the Yellow Line

BMIs

- Healthy Body Mass Index (less than 25.0 BMI)
- Overweight Body Mass Index (25.0 – 29.9 BMI)
- Obese Body Mass Index (30.0 – 34.9 BMI)
- Clinically Obese Body Mass Index (35.0 – 39.9 BMI)
- Morbidly Obese Body Mass Index (40.0 or above)

Notes

- *In week 4, the Blue Team lost the challenge and the penalty was to immediately eliminate someone from the team. Thus, Sean was eliminated.
- In week 5, John was eliminated from the game because he broke medical guidelines he had to follow, and thus could no longer compete in the White House.
- In week 6, in addition to the team weigh in, it was also an individual weigh in, because due to "The Walk" earlier that week, the winner of the weigh in, the individual with the highest weight loss percentage, would get the chance to win $50,000. (this money would only come if the winning contestant were to give up their spot in the competition, and it would be deducted from the total grand prize). Due to a penalty at the week's challenge, Cosi and Bryce were unable to compete for the money, and their weights would not count for their team's total. Bryce had the highest weight loss percentage, but because he wasn't eligible to win the money, his weight did not count; therefore, Michelle won the individual weigh-in.
- JJ was put on and originally eliminated under Michelle's Red Team. However, when the Black Team arrived in week 5, due to Steven quitting in Week 3, he was allowed to return as the fourth Black Team member, and then left in Week 7.
- In week 8 Michelle had gained immunity in Temptation (The Breakfast Bar) by eating a yoghurt (95 calories).
- In week 9, Garry gained 1.5 kg (3.3 lb), but due to his prize from the Walk, his results were switched with Kirstin's 1.7 kg (3.7 lb) weight loss.
- In week 10, Michelle was eliminated because she came last in the Super Challenge. She then returned in week 11 with Bryce and was eliminated via a formal elimination.
- In week 12, Bryce took a cash temptation for $34,000, and thus surrendered his place in the finals.

==== The Warehouse ====
Contestants must choose between two foods to have as their diet for the entire week. Except for the first week, the biggest loser from the previous weigh-in is the only person to choose on behalf of their team, the other team(s) must take the remaining item(s).

- Week 1 – Seafood vs Red Meat: Contestants were required to choose between seafood and red meat, which would form the basis of their diet for the next week. Initially, 12 contestants were in favour of the seafood, whereas 3 contestants made it clear that they would prefer the red meat. The discussion quickly degenerated into an argument, caused by a strong personality clash between JJ and Sheridan. The contestants were eventually unanimous in their decision to choose seafood.
- Week 2 – Cabbage vs Can Food: Contestants were required to choose between cabbage and can food (without any labels on) for the next week. However, since the contestants were in teams, one team would have cabbage and the other team would have can food. The food cannot be shared between the two teams, from this choice onwards. For being the Biggest Loser at the first weigh-in, Sean had the power to decide what the red and blue teams would have. He decided to pick cabbage before discussing it with his teammates, causing some friction between some members of the blue team. This meant that the red team was forced to take the can food where some of them consist of carrots, peas, potatoes, luncheon meat and condensed milk.
- Week 3 – Dine in vs Dine out: The warehouse was replaced with the last week's biggest loser (Sam) having the choice of "dine-in" or "dine-out" with unknown consequences. Sam chose for his team to dine out resulting in the red team having to choose from a menu of chips, burgers, steak sandwiches, and some salad. The blue team were sent to an unknown location where they were trained by the Commando before having a meal which consisted of steak and a choice of 5 salads before camping outside for the night.
- Week 4 – Shopping money vs Japanese cuisine: Contestants were required to choose between a 60-dollar shopping budget for each person or food prepared by a professional Japanese chef for the next week. Since Cosi was the biggest loser for the week he got to choose for the red team. He chose the 'ice cold cans of cash.'
- Week 6 – Cooked vs Uncooked: Contestant must choose between having all cooked and no cooked food. Whichever food Cosi didn't choose for the red team both the black and blue teams would have. Much to Garry's regret, Cosi chose the uncooked food for the red team.
- Week 7 – Green Food vs White Food vs Red Food: Contestant must choose between green food, white food and red food. Michelle for the being the Biggest Loser of the week (Bryce's weight loss didn't count) had the power to assign the foods for the week. Despite some friction by Bryce and JJ where JJ believed he was left out of the conversation, Michelle decided the black team would have the white food, blue team to have the red food and red team to have the green food because Sam (who she didn't mention his name earlier) wasn't going to cope with green food and having her revenge on the red team after Nicole's elimination.

No Warehouse in Week 5 due to the black team's arrival into the game. No Warehouses from Week 8 onwards due to Ajay announcing that the contestants would go to singles.

==== Temptation ====
Every week, temptation was tasks the involved contestants having to eat or not eat the food to win immunity and must face the walk. If a temptation wasn't won by any contestant, the contestant who currently hold immunity will retain the immunity and face another walk.

- Week 1 – Last Plate Standing: All contestants took places on their choice of large plates. Food started with a Smartie, and finished with Hamburger and Chips, with all manner of foods in between. Contestants were to start at the smarties and eat as much as they like, moving up the line. They would then stand on the leaders block until another contestant ate the next item of food. The person standing on the leaders block at the end of 45 minutes would win immunity and the right to take the walk. No contestants ate anything, and so were instructed to look under their plates for the immunity. Kirsten won immunity, as it was on her plate.
- Week 2 – Golden Fork: Two contestants at a time, one reigning contestant and one challenger, both contestants had the option of taking the fork for a chance of immunity. If either contestant does take the fork, he or she must eat the food that's being served on the table and is the reigning contestant. The other contestant is eliminated from the temptation. If neither contestant takes the golden fork after one minute (where time starts as soon as Rochester rings the dinner bell), the reigning contestant would win the round and won't have to eat the food on the plate. The reigning contestant also decides who he or she challenges in the next round. Play continues on until all but one contestant is eliminated and therefore wins this week's temptation. Because Kirsten was the current holder of immunity, she was the reigning contestant and played the first round against Nicole. In the end, after eating 1,780 calories (7,400 kJ) of food, Sheridan won immunity beating Sam, Michael, Sean and John for the fork and neither Cosi nor Garry took the fork for strategic reasons.
- Week 3 – Darts & Balloons: This challenge required speed and concentration. 3 tables were set out of junk food. There were also balloons and darts which the players had to pop once they had worked their way up the table. The food of course, was unhealthy food, so how much they ate would cost them if they didn't pop the balloon ahead. Garry got lucky and popped out "Immunity" which he got to go on the walk.
- Week 4 – The Cinema: This was the first temptation where contestants didn't play for immunity. Contestants were blindfolded with a bowl of chocolates on their laps. Whoever ate the most chocolates in 20 minutes would win a video message from home and a video camera. Garry ate 91 chocolates, mainly because Sam was making noises with his teeth. Garry had the choice of letting the other contestants watch their videos as well, and he chose to allow them to.
- Week 6 – Chance: The game was set out in a wheel type format. Contestants had to spin the wheel. There were 6 platters, one of them contained immunity and the other 5 were foods. There were also 6 wedges which contained prizes, but one contained a 1 kg penalty. Whoever spun the platters with "Immunity" written underneath it would win. JJ, after nearly spinning the 1 kg penalty, won.
- Week 8- The Breakfast Bar: Each contestant had to give a breakfast to someone. The breakfasts ranged from 45 calories (190 kJ) to 3,025 calories (12,660 kJ). If contestants finished eating their meal in 10 minutes, they were in with a chance for immunity. However, they were required to eat the full meal. Michelle, after receiving a 95 calories (400 kJ) bowl of yoghurt from Garry, was the only person to finish eating, and therefore was given immunity. Alison also tried for Immunity, but failed to finish eating a delicious, syrupy, tempting, mouth watering, stack of nine pancakes. Garry, for the first time ever, chose not to participate in Temptation, and did not eat any of his 3,025 calories (12,660 kJ) breakfast, given to him by Cosi.
- Week 9 – SNAP!: In each round consisted of a food being presented. The winner of a round of snap would have to eat the food, then decide who would not play snap anymore, thus not being able to win immunity. In the final round, Cosi and Garry were left. Cosi had won 5 rounds and Garry had won one. Garry out-snapped Cosi and ate some fish eyes to win immunity. Cosi was so upset that later in the day he went on a massive eating binge, since he had eaten so many foods in temptation, yet hadn't won, and also because in this point in the ga, me he had already reached his goal weight and realized there was no point in still being in the game.
- Week 11 – Eliminated contestants choice: The eliminated contestants got to choose who ate what food. Sam won by being given the sausage roll twice and at the last round made a deal with Kirsten "I won't eat if you don't". The E contestants chose Sam to win. The prize was a 1 kg advantage at the next weigh in.
- Week 12 – Last Plate Standing: Exactly the same as week 1 except they had 10 mins. Once again no-one ate and Alison had the plate with immunity. Later Garry said that he was going to choose that one except he took a side-step and chose a different one. He did this in the breakfast bar giving the yogurt to Michelle instead of to Sam.

No temptation in Week 5 due to the Black Team's arrival into the game. No temptation in Week 7 due to Michelle's decision regarding the acceptance of $50 000 and departing the White House, offered as a result of her being the Biggest Loser in Week 6. No temptation in week 10 due to Hawaii.

==== "The Walk" ====
- Week 1 – Kirsten: Kirsten won the right to take the walk with the previous temptation challenge. Ajay revealed that on the stone tablet's three names will be shown. Kirsten must then eliminate one of those contestants. Kirsten drew the tablet with her name, as well as Michael's and Monica's (she also had the option of eliminating herself). After talks with Michael and Monica, an impromptu elimination was held and Monica was eliminated, presumably because of her foot injury, even though Michael was perceived as a greater threat.
- Week 2 – Sheridan: Sheridan won the right to take the walk with the previous temptation challenge. Ajay revealed that there are three possible outcomes. One was the Red team loses its trainer, another is the Blue team loses its trainer, and the other is both teams loses their trainers. This effect applies until after the next elimination. Whatever the outcome, Sheridan must choose a replacement to train the team/s. Sheridan drew the tablet that said the Blue team loses its trainer, which meant that Shannan was not allowed to have any access to his team until after the next elimination. Sheridan also deliberated with the Red team and decided between Sean and Debbie for being the weakest link in the team where it was 3–3 on a vote. In the end, Sheridan chose Debbie as their new trainer for arguing with Shannan earlier in the week and other Blue contestants not getting along with her.
- Week 3 – Garry: Garry won the right to take the walk with the previous temptation challenge. Ajay revealed that there are two possible outcomes. The first was that the red team choose a member of the blue team to join their team. The second was the red team choose an eliminated player to rejoin their team, either JJ or Rachel. Either way, the red team would have another member join their team. Garry drew his stone and it was revealed that a member of the blue team would join the red team. Garry had until sundown to make his decision. Garry deliberated with his fellow team members on whether it would be Kirsten, Sam or Michael to join their team. In the end, Garry chose Sam as he felt he was the strongest member, and constantly pulled large numbers at the weigh in.
- Week 4: The Walk was not held in Week 4 due to the temptation not being for immunity.
- Week 6 – JJ: JJ won the right to take the walk which gave no choice to change the game. There was no stone, but a case which later revealed a game twist where a contestant would be eligible to take away $50,000 taken from the total prize amount if they left the game.
- Week 9 – Garry: When Garry went to the walk and there were two choices. Garry pulled one out and it said, "Swap your weight loss with a female opponent." Garry was told not to tell anyone until before the weigh-in. Garry eventually chose Kirsten.
- Week 12 – Alison: Alison arrived at the bridge with no one there, she had immunity but the rock said it was in jeopardy and to return to the white house. She could take $34,000 and leave or stay. She stayed.

==== Major Challenges ====
- Week 1 – The Maze: Contestants were to run 800 metres along Sydney Olympic Park and around the stadium track to enter a maze. The first two contestants to complete the course and maze won the reward of choosing their trainer and team members. Cosi and Sam won the challenge, Cosi chose to be in the Red team with Michelle and Sam chose Shannan in the Blue team.
- Week 2 – Surf boat race: Contestants were taken to a nearby beach where they were to compete in a surf boat race a distance of 1,600m (twice that of a standard race length of 800m). On completion of the boat course, contestants had to push their boat up the beach 200m and back. The winning team won the power to decide which member of the blue team would sit out at the weigh-in as their team numbers are uneven. A second reward was receiving letters from home. The red team started with an early lead, and the blue team won the challenge.
- Week 3 – Brain vs Brawn: The contestants were taken to a remote location, the challenge involved one team member answering questions related to food. While the other team members were to hold a "disc" that 10 kg (22 lb) weights would be dropped onto from an overhead conveyor belt, if the team member answering the questions answered incorrectly or not a close to the answer as the other teams representative. A team would win when the other team put down the disc. There were not rewards, but the losing team would incur a 3 kg (6.6 lb) weight penalty at the next weigh in.
- Week 4 – Tire Moving: The contestants had to move tires up a hill and throw them through a hole in a big crate at the top. Whichever team lost this challenge will eliminate one of its members. The Blue team lost and Sean got eliminated.
- Week 5 – Tug-a-war: The three teams had a challenge of tug-a-war. The tug-a-war match was in the mud and to start was 4 on each team. The first person from that team grabbed a flag of their colour could choose a person from their team to go and watch. Whoever grabbed all four of their teams flags will win. Garry won this for the red team.
- Week 6 – Water Polo: The three teams played a modified version of Water Polo. In the modified version, the contestants had to dive into the pool and swim to the other end. Once the contestants reached the end of the pool, the contestants had to dive underwater, grab the ball and swim back to the starting end. Once the contestants reached the starting end, the contestants had to try to shoot a goal. The first to five won. The blue team won the challenge.
- Week 7 – Chin-up Challenge: Teams had to see how many half chin-ups they could do. The red team won that part. But then the contestants had to bet on how many full chin-ups they could do to win. Sam bet 43 and then the blue team managed to do it.
- Week 8 – Bus Pull: Contestants and their legend partner must pull a 9 tonne bus 100 m (330 ft). There were four heats, two semis and a final. Alison + Damien and Garry + Pati were in the final, which was 330 m (1,080 ft). Garry and Pati won, giving Garry a 2 kg (4.4 lb) advantage.
- Week 9 – 7 Deadly Tonnes: Contestants had their own tonne to move over a field. Once they finish they had the option of helping someone else with their tonne. The winner would receive a 42-inch plasma TV, and last place would weigh-in immediately after the challenge. Cosi just beat Garry and Michelle came last.
- Week 10 – The Super Challenge: Where contestants had to Run, Ride and Kayak around the island of Hawaii. If there was a challenge to win this is the one because the loser would be sent home and gone from the competition. Despite coming in 4th and getting 4th pick of the food, it turned out to be Michelle with the most calories, choosing the 600 ml (21 imp fl oz; 20 US fl oz) Fanta soft drink and getting sent home. Leaving the black team with no members left at all, with Byrce being sent home the week before and the first time Jillian having no-one representing her at the finale. Michelle and Bryce later re-entered the house via the eliminated contestants race; Michelle was eliminated again, and Bryce decided to cash out with his $34,000 offer, therefore, Jillian has surrendered her place in the finale.

==== Elimination ====
Teams have to participate in the elimination if they have the lowest percentage of weight loss at the previous weigh-in. Contestants must vote strategically to stay in the game and eliminate another contestant by a majority vote. If the vote is tied it's a hung vote and the power of elimination is given to the other team where they must vote as one when making their decision.

- Week 1 – Monica & JJ: Monica was eliminated before the first weigh-in and official elimination as part of a decision by Kirsten in the walk, as the two teams needed to be even. The red team was the first to enter the elimination room with the first official eliminated contestant being JJ with a 4–3 vote with an all-girls alliance. Kirsten had immunity but wasn't up for elimination.
- Week 2 – Rachel: Rachel was eliminated with a majority of 4 votes out of a possible 6. She voted for Nicole based on weight loss, Cosi's vote wasn't revealed but due to the alliance with Garry would likely to have been Rachel also. This is the second elimination episode in the Australian series that the same team was up for elimination two weeks consecutively (it first occurred back in season 1). Sheridan had immunity and so was not able to be eliminated.
- Week 3 – Steven & Debbie: Although not part of an elimination episode, Steven left the black team during week 3. At the official elimination, Debbie was voted out with a 4-vote majority. She had previously discussed that she was ready to leave the game. Sean was also discussed to be the alternative to be voted off, yet Debbie voted for John. As there were 6 contestants voting a tied vote would give the Red team power to vote anybody off the team.
- Week 4 – Sean & Sheridan: Sean was eliminated as a result of losing a mid-week challenge. The penalty for losing the challenge was to eliminated one team member.
- Week 5 – John & Michael: John was removed from the game in the episode airing 5 March 2008 for defying medic's orders to both always wear a chest strap heart rate monitor and always train with a medic present.
- Week 6 – Nicole: Twin Nicole was eliminated with a 3–1 vote, Garry holding the swing vote to pass power to the other teams but maintaining his alliance with the other contestants. Nicole wanted to get a 2–2 hung vote by gaining Garry's vote telling him to vote out Cosi for being very manipulative and currently has the best chance of winning the Biggest Loser. This would mean the black and blue teams would vote out Cosi for being a big threat in the game. However, after Nicole left the game, both black and blue teams gained up on the remaining red team for voting out Nicole as they all believed she deserved to stay in the game and that the red alliance only cared for each other and nobody else. Carrianne later approached Nicole after elimination before being driven away from the white house.
- Week 7 – JJ & Carrianne: Mid week, JJ, who returned to the competition as a black team member in week 4, left the competition out of choice. At the official elimination, twin Carrianne herself was the next eliminated with a 2–1 vote. Before the vote, Cosi tried to convince Michelle to vote out Bryce for being a major threat in the game. Michelle nearly volunteered to be voted out. Unfortunately, Carrianne was voted out even though Carrianne voted for Michelle. After the vote, the Black team said it had to be done and Cosi didn't buy it.
- Week 8 – Nicola: Nicola was the next to be voted out 3–2. Bryce's vote was not revealed. Between Alison and Nicola, the former red and blue teams voted against each other, leaving Michelle and Bryce the deciding votes. Michelle voted Nicola because she didn't get along with her well, was part of the blue-black alliance and getting revenge against Nicole's elimination. After Nicola left the room, Cosi commented Michelle that she should be voting out threats in the game like Bryce when she had a chance and as a result, she should vote out Alison as she's currently 4th in the overall leaderboard compared to Nicola ranked 7th. Michelle countered saying that he should have voted out Garry (who was a threat back then) instead of Nicole.
- Week 9 – Bryce: Bryce got eliminated with three votes out of five. After he got eliminated, he gave Sam his watch as a reward for great gameplay. Michelle was the only Black left until she was eliminated in Hawaii the next week.
- Week 10 – Michelle & Cosi: Michelle was eliminated as part of a super challenge. With Michelle's elimination, this leaves the Black Team with no members left, which means for the first time ever, Jillian had no one representing her at the finale. However, Bryce now remains in the house after the eliminated contestants race.
- Week 11 – Michelle:After Michelle and Bryce re-entered the house, Michelle was eliminated again, as the blue team maintained its alliance.
- Week 12 – Bryce and Garry:After Alison turned down $34,000, all contestants were given a chance to take a sum of money equal to the percentage of body weight they've lost (e.g. 30% = $30,000) and leave the house. Bryce decided to take the money and left the show. As he surrendered his place in the finale, so did his trainer Jillian. At the official elimination, the blue team once again stuck with loyalty votes, and the two above the yellow line voted Garry out, leaving the final three of Alison, Sam, and Kirsten. This is the first season where two entire teams have been eliminated, (granted, also the first time 3 teams competed) and this the second season where only one team was represented in the final, second to season 2. A similar set-up like this occurred in the Fourth American Season. Everything about this season and the American Season is the same except for the fact that it was the Black Team being represented in the finale instead of the Blue Team.

Contestant	Wk 1	Wk 2	Wk 3	Wk 4	Wk 5	Wk 6	Wk 7	Wk 8	Wk 9	Wk 10	Wk 11	Wk 12
Eliminated	Monica & JJ	Rachel	Steven & Debbie	Sean & Sheridan	John & Michael	Nicole	JJ & Carrianne	Nicola	Bryce	Michelle & Cosi	Michelle	Bryce & Garry
Sam	X	X	X	Cosi	Michael	X	X	Nicola	Bryce	X	Michelle	Garry
Alison	X	X	Debbie	X	Michael	X	X	X	Bryce	Cosi	Michelle	Garry
Kirsten	Monica	X	?	X	Michael	X	X	Nicola	X	Cosi	X	X
Garry	Rachel	Rachel	X	Sheridan	X	Nicole	X	Alison	?	Sam	?	Eliminated Wk 12
Bryce	Arrived – Wk 5				X	X	Carrianne	?	X	Elim Wk 9, Return Wk 11	Kirsten	Took Money Offer Wk 12
Michelle	Arrived – Wk 5				X	X	Carrianne	Nicola	Kirsten	Elim Wk 10, Return Wk 11	X	Eliminated Wk 11
Cosi	Rachel	?	X	Sheridan	X	Nicole	X	Alison	Bryce	X	Eliminated Wk 10	
Nicola	JJ	Rachel	X	Sheridan	X	Nicole	X	X	Eliminated Wk 8			
Carrianne	Arrived – Wk 5				X	X	Michelle	Eliminated Wk 7				
JJ	Rachel	Eliminated Wk 1 From Red team, Returned on Black team week 4			X	X	X	Quit Mid Wk 7				
Nicole	JJ	Rachel	X	Sam	X	Cosi	Eliminated Wk 6					
Michael	X	X	Debbie	X	Sam	Eliminated Wk 5						
John	X	X	Debbie	X	X	Removed Wk 5 for breaking exercise guidelines imposed for his safety						
Sheridan	JJ	Rachel	X	Cosi	Eliminated Wk 4							
Sean	X	X	Debbie	X	Eliminated via Challenge Penalty Wk 4							
Debbie	X	X	John	Eliminated Wk 3								
Steven				Quit Mid Wk 3								
Rachel	JJ	Nicole	Eliminated Wk 2									
Monica	X	Eliminated Mid Wk 1 via "The Walk"										

Immunity
X Below yellow line, unable to vote
X Not in elimination, unable to vote
? Vote not revealed
Eliminated or not in house
X Eliminated via penalty or quit before an official elimination (excluding money offers)
Last person eliminated before the finale
Valid vote cast
Elimination notes

- After the Week 7 elimination (Carrianne was eliminated), Ajay announced that a major curveball was coming. This was later revealed to be that the contestants were going to singles. After the announcement, the contestants found different coloured shirts in their room, which is the first time it has happened.
- JJ, Bryce, and Michelle are the only contestants to be eliminated twice; JJ was first eliminated in an official elimination in week 1, returned week 4 as a replacement contestant, and quit week 7. Bryce was first eliminated in week 9 in an official elimination, returned two weeks later via a special challenge, and then took a money offer and surrendered his place in the game. Michelle was first eliminated by the Super Challenge, returned one week later via a special challenge, and was re-eliminated at an official elimination.

==== Hawaii ====
In week 10 the contestants went to Hawaii to fulfill their nightmares. Garry climbed a mountain, Kirsten paraglided, Sam swam in a shark cage, but then hopped out of the cage, Michelle went up 5 000 feet in an engine-less glider and Cosi and Alison jumped 10m into a blowhole.

=== The 11 at home ===
After 19 contestants were chosen to compete for the main prize, the remaining 11 were sent home. Michelle and Shannan helped the contestants lose weight via the internet. They gave them gym memberships and $10,000 in prize money from the Biggest Loser Club online website to compete for. Throughout the season, some episodes had segments in which Shannan and Michelle would catch up with these 11 to show the viewers the progress they made.

== Cast and personalities ==
- Host: Ajay Rochester returned for a third consecutive season to host the third season.
- Trainers:
  - Shannan Ponton and Michelle Bridges returned for their second season. Shannan trained the blue team and Michelle the red team.
  - US trainers Bob Harper and Jillian Michaels also made brief appearances appear, training a secret black team of contestants in the United States.
  - Australian Commando trainer Steve Willis also appeared in the first three episodes, along with other episodes to train the blacks and to participate in the challenge to get two of the blacks (Bryce and Michelle) back in the game, as well as the Dine out option for temptation, Week 3.

=== Contestants ===
The season began with 30 contestants, 15 were selected by Shannan and Michelle to enter the White House; however, to make sure that each team had the same number of players, one would have to be eliminated. Of the remaining 15, 4 received a second chance to become part of the Black Team selected by the Commando to be trained by Bob and Jillian in Los Angeles for 4 weeks before heading to the White House and being trained by The Commando.

==== Original and Second Chance Contestants ====
Contestants are listed in chronological order of elimination.

New Arrival Contestant	Age	Hometown / Local Roots	Career / Corporate Sector	Family Tracking Foundations	Entry Weight (W5)	Assigned Team
Phil Gibbs	52	Brisbane Northside (Chermside)	Disability Support Worker • Day Services & SIL Full-Care	• Son of June • Married 1987 • Father to two sons: Chris and Tom	130.7 kg	Blue Team(Replaced Steven)
Matthew Ford	25	Gold Coast • Born: 26 April 1982	University Corporate Worker • Business Operations	• Sisters: Kate (23) & Ariane (13) • Overeating cycle started at age 14	123.5 kg	Blue Team(Replaced John)
Mandi Vance	35	Melbourne	Tram Business Manager • Infrastructure Services	• Mother of Three • Teen Mom in 1989 • Children: Andrew, Luke, Alana	109.2 kg	Red Team(Structural Slot)

Contestant	Age	Hometown	Occupation	Team	Status
Monica Smith	20	Perth, Western Australia	Childcare Worker	Eliminated before teams were picked	Eliminated mid-Week 1 "The Walk"
Rachel Hogg	20	Perth, Western Australia	Casual Worker	Red Team	Eliminated Week 2
Steven Pelham	29	Cairns, Queensland	Community Development Manager	Black Team	Quit Week 3
Debbie Dunn	39	Toronto, New South Wales	Office Co-Ordinator	Blue Team	Eliminated Week 3
Sean Holbrook	45	Camperdown, New South Wales	Roof Plumber	Blue Team	Eliminated mid-Week 4 via Challenge; Runners-Up Prize Winner ($30,000)
Sheridan Wright	26	Melbourne, Victoria	Teacher	Red Team	Eliminated Week 4
John Morrall	44	Noosa Heads, Queensland	Advertising Manager	Blue Team	Evicted Week 5
Michael Sandford	25	Orange, New South Wales	Accountant	Blue Team	Eliminated Week 5
Nicole Rees	23	Adelaide, South Australia	Registered Nurse	Red Team	Eliminated Week 6
John "JJ" Jeffrey	33	Adelaide, South Australia	Truck Driver	Black Team^{[*]}	Eliminated Week 1; Returned Week 4; Quit Week 7
Carrianne Rees	23	Adelaide, South Australia	Registered Nurse	Black Team	Eliminated Week 7
Nicola Coyle	21	Gold Coast, Queensland	Student/Receptionist	Red Team	Eliminated Week 8
Andrew "Cosi" Costello	28	Murray Bridge, South Australia	Radio Announcer	Red Team	Eliminated Week 10
Michelle Lozanovski	20	Sydney, New South Wales	Apprentice Hairdresser	Black Team	Eliminated Mid-Week 10 via Super Challenge; Returned Week 11; Re-Eliminated Week 11
Bryce Harvey	24	Brisbane, Queensland	Sales Manager	Black Team	Eliminated Week 9; Returned Week 11; Cashed Out Week 12
Garry Guerreiro	32	Revesby, New South Wales	Financial Services	Red Team	Eliminated Week 12
Kirsten Binnie	32	Melbourne, Victoria	High School Teacher	Blue Team	3rd Place ($10,000)
Alison Braun	34	Perth, Western Australia	Therapy Co-ordinator	Blue Team	2nd Place ($25,000)
Sam Rouen	19	Campbelltown, New South Wales	University student	Blue Team	Biggest Loser ($200,000)

^[*]JJ was originally on the Red Team, but due to Steven quitting in week 3, Bob and Jillian chose JJ among the first 5 eliminated contestants to replace him on the Black Team.

==== Biggest Loser Online Club Contestants ====
The 11 remaining contestants went home to lose weight with the help of the Biggest Loser Online Club. The player with the highest percentage of weight loss would win $10,000 at the finale. Craig Smith was announced the winner, losing 36.50% of his body weight.

Contestant	Age	Starting Weight
Misilei Mamae	35	158.1 kg
Dianne Brooker	30	114.4 kg
Alison Hallion	36	124.4 kg
Lauren Coyle	23	127.5 kg
Sandy Catlin	36	105.8 kg
Stacey Sullivan	28	128.4 kg
Steve Haynes	37	140.7 kg
Adam Jackson	27	161.1 kg
Craig Smith	38	142.3 kg
Damien Webb	36	141.9 kg
Darryl Lawandos	35	163 kg

== Production and release ==
=== Filming locations & dates ===
Primary film locations were in "The White House" located at 4 Kinka Road, Terrey Hills, Sydney 33°40′48″S 151°11′54″E. Elements were also filmed in Los Angeles, California.

Primary production commenced in October 2007 and completed in February 2008.

=== Air dates and channels ===
The program began screening on 3 February 2008 on Network TEN and continued weeknights at 7:00 pm and Sundays 6:30-7.30 pm each week.

== Reception and public response ==
=== Television viewing and ratings ===
The season premiere attracted 1.91 million viewers, an improvement of 118,000 on the previous season premiere.

The season finale attracted an average of 1.88 million viewers, peaking at 2.35 million. It was marginally down on the previous two seasons but still became the highest rating program of the year at the time of broadcast.
