= Excess Baggage (TV series) =

2012 Australian reality television series

- Genre: Reality
- Presented by: Kate Ceberano
- Starring: Christian Marchegiani (personal trainer); Dr. Joanna McMillan (nutritionist); Dr. Timothy Sharp (psychologist)
- Opening theme: "What Makes You Beautiful" by One Direction
- Country of origin: Australia
- Original language: English
- No. of seasons: 1
- No. of episodes: 33

Production
- Production location: Sydney
- Running time: 60–90 minutes (with commercials)
- Production company: FremantleMedia Australia

Original release
- Network: Nine Network (ep. 1–6); GO! (ep. 7 onwards)
- Release: 30 January – 29 March 2012

Excess Baggage is an Australian television reality show that first aired on the Nine Network on 30 January 2012. Due to dismal ratings it was moved to digital channel GO! on 13 February 2012. The basic premise involves eight celebrities teamed with eight contestants in a weight loss competition. It features three experts: psychologist Dr. Timothy Sharp (AKA Dr. Happy), nutritionist Dr. Joanna McMillan and personal trainer Christian Marchegiani.

== The Celebrities ==
| Celebrity | Age | Known for |
|---|---|---|
| Christine Anu | 42 | Australian pop singer and actress. |
| Kate DeAraugo | 26 | Australian singer-songwriter and winner of the third season of Australian Idol. |
| Robert "Dipper" DiPierdomenico | 53 | Former Australian rules footballer in the VFL/AFL. |
| Kevin Federline | 33 | American dancer and rapper. Ex-husband of pop singer Britney Spears. |
| Darryn Lyons | 46 | Australian paparazzo and media personality. Placed 6th in the eighth series of Celebrity Big Brother UK. |
| Gabby Millgate | 40 | Australian comedian writer and performer. Famous for the line "You're terrible, Muriel" in the film Muriel's Wedding. |
| Ajay Rochester | 42 | Winner of Excess Baggage. Australian television personality and author. Host of The Biggest Loser Australia from 2006 to 2009. |
| Brant Webb | 42 | Australian miner and survivor of the Beaconsfield Mine collapse. |

== Teams ==
| Team | Celebrity | Celebrity's charity | Contestant | Status |
|---|---|---|---|---|
| Purple | Ajay Rochester | No Hate Campaign | Matthew Palmer | Excess Baggage Champions |
| Red | Darryn Lyons | Geelong Community Foundation | Lisa Giammaria | 7th Eliminated (Week 9) |
| Orange | Robert "Dipper" DiPierdomenico | TBA | Lana Pilakis | 6th Eliminated (Week 9) |
| Blue | Kevin Federline | Variety Australia | Renae Pratt | 5th Eliminated (Week 9) |
| Yellow | Christine Anu | TBA | Nathan Pamenter | 4th Eliminated (Week 8) |
| Pink | Kate DeAraugo | TBA | Sarah Robinson | 3rd Eliminated (Week 7) |
| Green | Gabby Milgate | Children's Medical Research Institute (Australia) | Ben Jones | 2nd Eliminated (Week 6) |
| Grey | Brant Webb | TBA | John Rose | 1st Eliminated (Week 5) |

== Locations ==
Each week, the teams travel to different locations across Australia.

Week 1 – The Kimberly, WA

Week 2 – The Whitsundays, QLD

Week 3 – Tasmania

Week 4 – Hunter Valley, NSW

Week 5 – Gold coast, QLD

Week 6 – Sydney, NSW

Week 7 – Kangaroo Island, SA

Week 8 – Southern Highlands, NSW

Week 9 – Melbourne, VIC

== Spirit Challenges ==
A spirit challenge is a physical challenge which highlights the location that they are visiting. Points are usually on offer to the top teams in this challenge.

Week 1 – Spirit walk: They met Christian and teams started to walk in different directions. On their walk, teams found presents from home. Darryn gave Lisa some tough love after she started to cry. The walk made each team find out more about their team members and some of their emotional baggage. As this was the first day, no points were on offer.

Week 2 – Swimming and sailing: Teams had to start by jumping off a speed boat and swim to daydream island. There they collect their team flag and one of four keys to a sailboat. Then the four teams race along an ocean course to the finish line. The blue team were the first to get a boat, followed by orange, yellow and green. The green teams boat went off course, and the orange teams stopped completely. The blue team won and got 5 points then the yellow team getting 3 points. The green team got back on track and getting two points for coming third, with the orange team coming fourth and one point. Everyone else got no points.

Week 3 – Catch of the day

Week 4 – Wine making

Week 5 – Lifeguard training

Week 6 – AFL extravaganza

Week 7 – Carrying history

Week 8 – Farmer's wife

Week 9 – Carrying the excess baggage

== Endurance Challenges ==
An endurance challenge is a physical and mental challenge which is designed to test the teams' trust and communication skills. Usually all the teams can earn points.

Week 1 – The blind leading the blind: Kevin and Renee did not compete as Kevin collapsed the previous day and taken to hospital. In today's challenge, one team member had to guide the other team member through an obstacle course while blindfolded. The winning team also gets $10,000 for that teams celebrity charity. Heat 1 was Christine and Nathan, Gabby and Ben, Brant and Johnny. Brant and Johnny won and went into the final round. Heat 2 was Ajay and Matt, Kate and Sarah, Darryn and Lisa, Dipper and Lana. Kate and Sarah won heat 2. Before the final round, Lisa was upset from Darryn and was consoled by Ajay. Matt and Darryn had an argument. The final round was Brant and John and Kate and Sarah. This was a new course over rough terrain ending in jumping into a tank of water. Brant and Johnny, got $10,000 for Brant's charity and 8 points. Kate and Sarah got 6 points. Everyone else got 2 points except for Kevin and Renee who got 0.

Week 2 – Raft race: For the challenge, teams had to use wood and barrels to create a raft then paddle to a speedboat out at sea and sound a horn. All teams struggled at the start while building the raft but in the end it was the grey team Brant and John who won another endurance challenge and the maximum points available.

Week 3 – Brains and Brawn:

Week 4 – Full of hot air:

Week 5 – Race up Q1:

Week 6 – Track and field:

Week 7 – Maths Dunes:

Week 8 – Horseshoe Hill

Week 9 – Railway ramble: The teams had to solve three common clues and one personal to each team. The clues will lead them to bags filled with puzzle pieces which are scattered over the station which will they had to make a 110 piece jigsaw of the four teams. The common clues lead to bags hidden in luggage on a train, in a massive pile of coal and in barrels of ice cold water. However many dummy bags were placed to confuse the teams. Orange, purple and red were close throughout while blue were obliviously seen to struggle while solving the clues and picking up many dummy bags. Red were first to start the puzzle but a lot of arguing let the purple team get ahead and win with red getting second. Orange kept having pieces the wrong way round letting blue catch up but they came third and blue came last.

Week 9 – Super challenge: This challenge took place at Bear Island, a stronghold used during war. The teams had to run down a jetty into the fort and to one of four stations in which they could do in any order where they would use a key or number to open a box containing parts of a decoder. When they finished they would head to a team colour station where they had to decode a message of encouragement from either one of the judges or Kate. Points were on offer. The stations were: water weight from the endurance challenge in Tasmania, Popping balloons from the endurance challenge in the Hunter valley, undoing knots from the endurance challenge in the Gold coast and milk maid from the spirit challenge in the southern highlands. The blue and purple teams got the first keys; the red team got the lead but got stuck on the water challenge which they struggled at before. The orange team fell behind early while undoing the knots. Blue and purple got back in the lead and blue won the challenge and 8 much needed points with purple not far behind putting them in the lead on points for week. Reds bickering led to orange getting third and reds getting five points.

== Breakthrough Experience ==
A breakthrough experience is to help teams overcome some of their deepest darkest fears and help they get rid of the fear that is holding them back. They don't have to take part in these challenges.

Week 1 – Crocodiles: After meeting their psychologist, Dr Tim, teams were given the option to go swimming in a lake full of deadly Crocodiles. Though, most were hesitant at first especially Nathan but in the end all of the contestants took part.

Week 2 – Great Barrier reef: Kate and Sarah and Darryn and Lisa were chosen to go snorkeling in the great barrier reef. To get to the reef wall, they had to swim 20m through the strong currents, Kate and Sarah made it while Darryn and Lisa were not so lucky and got tired quickly. They had to go down instantly with Darryn panicking quickly but managed to reach the end with Kate and Sarah enjoying the trip.

Week 3 – Dam wall

Week 4 – Stunt planes

Week 5 – The circus

Week 6 – none: There was no breakthrough experience this week due to super sports week and concentrating on Kevin's heart attack

Week 7 – Caving

Week 8 – Skydiving

Week 9 – Helicopter crash rescue

== Episodes ==
| Week | Episodes | | Air date | Viewers | Nightly Rank | Channel | Source |
|---|---|---|---|---|---|---|---|
| 1 | 1 | "Episode 1" | 30 January 2012 | 880,000 | No. 12 | Nine Network | |
| 1 | 2 | "Episode 2" | 31 January 2012 | 625,000 | No. 16 | Nine Network | |
| 1 | 3 | "Episode 3" | 2 February 2012 | 555,000 | No. 15 | Nine Network | |
| 2 | 4 | "Episode 4" | 6 February 2012 | 610,000 | —N/a | Nine Network | |
| 2 | 5 | "Episode 5" | 7 February 2012 | 474,000 | —N/a | Nine Network | |
| 2 | 6 | "Episode 6" | 8 February 2012 | 503,000 | No. 20 | Nine Network | |
| 3 | 7 | "Episode 7" | 13 February 2012 | 118,000 | —N/a | GO! | |
| 3 | 8 | "Episode 8" | 14 February 2012 | 95,000 | —N/a | GO! | |
| 3 | 9 | "Episode 9" | 15 February 2012 | | —N/a | GO! | |
| 3 | 10 | "Episode 10" | 16 February 2012 | | —N/a | GO! | |
| 4 | 11 | "Episode 11" | 20 February 2012 | 96,000 | —N/a | GO! | |
| 4 | 12 | "Episode 12" | 21 February 2012 | | —N/a | GO! | |
| 4 | 13 | "Episode 13" | 22 February 2012 | | —N/a | GO! | |
| 4 | 14 | "Episode 14" | 23 February 2012 | | —N/a | GO! | |
| 5 | 15 | "Episode 15" | 27 February 2012 | | —N/a | GO! | |
| 5 | 16 | "Episode 16" | 28 February 2012 | | —N/a | GO! | |
| 5 | 17 | "Episode 17" | 29 February 2012 | | —N/a | GO! | |
| 5 | 18 | "Episode 18" | 1 March 2012 | | —N/a | GO! | |
| 6 | 19 | "Episode 19" | 5 March 2012 | | —N/a | GO! | |
| 6 | 20 | "Episode 20" | 7 March 2012 | | —N/a | GO! | |
| 6 | 21 | "Episode 21" | 8 March 2012 | | —N/a | GO! | |
| 7 | 22 | "Episode 22" | 12 March 2012 | 84,000 | —N/a | GO! | |
| 7 | 23 | "Episode 23" | 13 March 2012 | | —N/a | GO! | |
| 7 | 24 | "Episode 24" | 14 March 2012 | | —N/a | GO! | |
| 7 | 25 | "Episode 25" | 15 March 2012 | | —N/a | GO! | |
| 8 | 26 | "Episode 26" | 19 March 2012 | | —N/a | GO! | |
| 8 | 27 | "Episode 27" | 20 March 2012 | | —N/a | GO! | |
| 8 | 28 | "Episode 28" | 21 March 2012 | | —N/a | GO! | |
| 8 | 29 | "Episode 29" | 22 March 2012 | | —N/a | GO! | |
| 9 | 30 | "Episode 30" | 26 March 2012 | | —N/a | GO! | |
| 9 | 31 | "Episode 31" | 27 March 2012 | | —N/a | GO! | |
| 9 | 32 | "Episode 32" | 28 March 2012 | 44,000 | —N/a | GO! | |
| 9 | 33 | "Grand Finale" | 29 March 2012 | 95,000 | —N/a | GO! | |

== See also ==
- List of Australian television series
- Celebrity Overhaul
- The Biggest Loser
