= Ajay Rochester =

Australian actress, author and producer (born 1969)

- Born: 17 April 1969 (age 57); Sydney, Australia
- Occupations: Television presenter of The Biggest Loser, author, actress, comedian, speaker, producer
- Known for: The Biggest Loser
- Children: Kai Rochester

Ajay Rochester (born 1969 in Sydney) is an Australian actress, author and producer. She was the host of the Australian version of the reality weight-loss television series The Biggest Loser, for which she hosted a total of four series between 2006 and 2009.

== Family and personal life ==
Rochester was adopted as a child, and says she was emotionally and physically abused by her adoptive mother. She found her birth mother in 1992 after years of searching. Her birth mother died from suicide a year later. Rochester suffered from obesity, which she attributed to the death of her birth mother and her estrangement from her adoptive mother. She resolved to lose weight following the birth of her child, and shed over 50 kilograms (110 lb) since giving birth.

== Weight loss work ==
Recording her weight loss after her son's birth, she filmed the documentary Larger Than Life which aired on The Lifestyle channel. It followed Rochester for a year as she lost weight and took back her life.

Since then, she has been involved in several weight loss projects, including as host of four seasons (2006, 2007, 2008 and 2009) The Biggest Loser on Network Ten.

She founded a website, "The Healthy Body Club", and authored the books Confessions of a Reformed Dieter, Blubberguts and The Lazy Girl's Guide to Losing Weight and Getting Fit.

Rochester also published a children's book called Blubberguts with Hodder Headline's Hotshots series. She has also published two more titles with new Holland including cookbook Food You Love and self-help inspirational book 5-Minute Diet Book.

Rochester joined a weight loss reality show as a celebrity contestant, Excess Baggage which was broadcast from January through March 2012. Rochester won the show and her charity the NOH8 Campaign received a $60,000 donation for her efforts.

== Other television work ==
Rochester was one of the stars of the MyxTv television series "Cast Me" where four casting producers (including Rochester) cast various roles for wannabe actors.

Rochester appeared on the reality television series Celebrity Dog School with her Pomeranian, "Bootsie".

She was also the co-host of the SBS TV series Mum's The Word.

Rochester and teammate Matthew Palmer won the 2012 reality TV show Excess Baggage on Channel 9 Australia.

She has a recurring role in the Reelz Channel series Beverly Hills Pawn and appeared on America's Court.

In 2019, Rochester participated in the fifth season of the Australian version of I'm a Celebrity...Get Me Out of Here!.

In March 2020, Rochester appeared on First Dates Australia.

== Sound recordings ==
in 2001, Rochester recorded an album of sound poetry, with her monologues backed by a band, under the stage name of A. J. Rochester. The album, Sexual Encounters, chronicled her sex life up to that point. The album was released by indie Sydney record label Broken Records and was dedicated to her son Kai.

== Charity work ==
Rochester is the ambassador for the Eating Disorders Foundation. She has worked with The Make A Wish Foundation and is an advocate for breast cancer research lending her time to multiple breast cancer charities including the Field of Women and BCNA. Rochester is also the face and ambassador for Triathlonpink.com and walked the Great Wall of China to raise funds to build the Olivia Newton-John Wellness Centre.

== Short film work ==
In the late 1990s, Rochester also co-wrote and produced several short films while she was working the comedy circuits in Australia. Her 1998 film BruiZer won the best short at the Scenefest Short Film Festival and was the runner up at the Brisbane Schlock-fest Film festival. She also had a weekly comedy segment on AM Adelaide on Channel 7.

== Published works ==
Rochester's first book Confessions of a Reformed Dieter was nominated for an Audie award for most inspirational talking book – bestowed annually in the US for outstanding audiobooks but was beaten by Dr Phil's The Ultimate Weight Solution. Confessions of Reformed Dieter is now in its eighth print run. In 2005, Rochester's book Lazy Girl's Guide to Losing Weight and Getting Fit was published by Random House and made the Sydney Morning Herald top five best seller list.

Her most recent books are The 5-Minute Diet Book and a recipe book called Food You Love.

She has also written a children's book titled Blubberguts.

== Bibliography ==
=== Contributor ===
- Rochester, AJ (2007). "Contributor". Laugh Even Louder!. By Camp Quality. Gosford, New South Wales: Scholastic Australia Pty Limited. ISBN 978-1-74169-022-4.
